= Nizampur =

Nizampur may refer to:

- Nizampur, Panipat, Haryana
- Nizampur, Amritsar, a village in Punjab, India
- Nizampur Gobari, a town in Azamgarh district in the state of Uttar Pradesh, India
- Nizampur, Khyber Pakhtunkhwa, a town in Pakistan
- Nizampur, Maharashtra a village in Mahad Taluka, Raigad District, Konkan region of India
