= Rashid Minhas =

Pakistani pilot and war hero (1951–1971)

Rashid Minhas NH
- راشد منہاس
- Official military portrait, c. 1971
- Born: 17 February 1951; Karachi, Federal Capital Territory, Pakistan
- Died: 20 August 1971 (aged 20); Sujawal District, Sindh, Pakistan
- Cause of death: Jet crash
- Burial place: Karachi, Sindh, Pakistan
- Alma mater: St Patrick's High School, Karachi
- Military career
- Allegiance: Pakistan
- Service/branch: Pakistan Air Force
- Service years: 13 March 1971 – 20 August 1971
- Rank: Pilot officer
- Service number: Pak/5602
- Unit: No. 2 Squadron
- Conflicts: Bangladesh Liberation War †
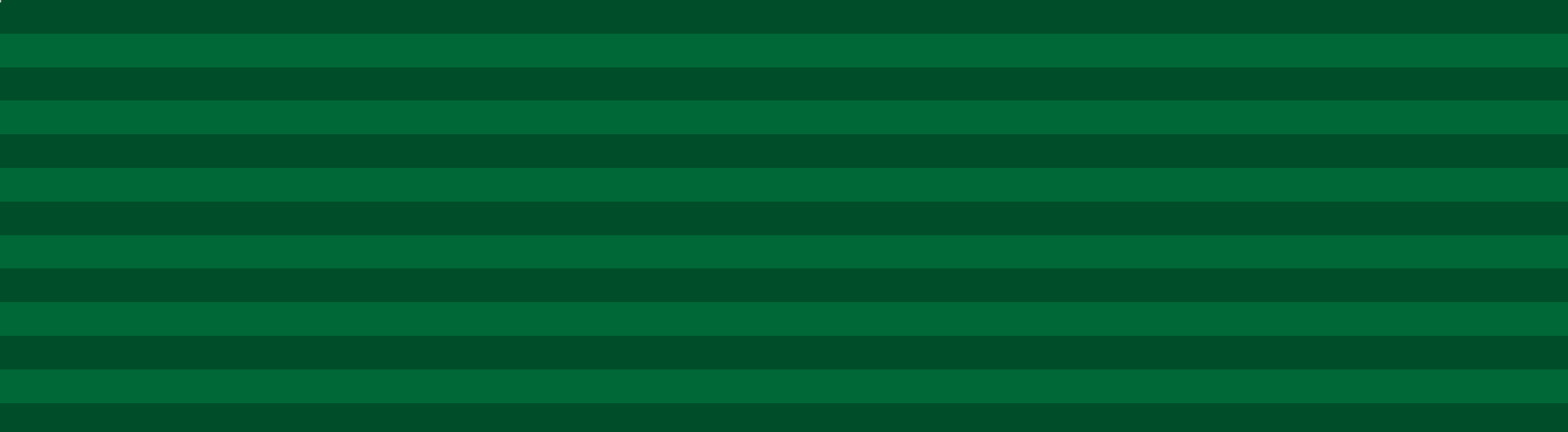
- Awards: Nishan-e-Haider
- Website: "Rashid Minhas (Shaheed)".

Pilot Officer Rashid Minhas (Note: Punjabi and Urdu: راشد منہاس) NH (17 February 1951 – 20 August 1971) was a Pakistani fighter pilot and the fifth recipient of Pakistan's highest military award, the Nishan-e-Haider. He was the first and only officer from the Pakistan Air Force to receive the Nishan-e-Haider, and was also the youngest and the shortest-serving officer to have received the award. During a routine training mission in August 1971, Minhas attempted to gain control of his jet trainer when his superior officer Flight Lieutenant Matiur Rahman BS took control of the plane to join the Bangladesh War of Independence, but Minhas resisted his efforts to control the aircraft and crashed it in Sujawal District in Pakistan.

== Biography ==
Rashid Minhas was born on 17 February 1951 to Begum Rashida Minhas (1926–2021) in Karachi, into a Punjabi Muslim Rajput family of the Minhas clan. Rashid Minhas spent his early childhood in Karachi. Later, the family shifted to Rawalpindi, before returning to Karachi. Minhas was fascinated with aviation history and technology. He used to collect different models of jets and other aircraft. He attended St. Patrick's High School, Karachi.

The ancestors of Rashid Minhas belonged to Qila Sobha Singh in Narowal District and later on they moved to Karachi where Rashid Minhas was born. His father, Majeed Minhas, a civil engineer and an alumnus of the NED University in Karachi, was in a construction management business who later moved to Lahore, Punjab, for the construction projects. Rashid was educated in Lahore and enrolled in the British-managed St. Mary's School in Rawalpindi when his father found an employment opportunity. But later they permanently settled in Karachi.

He passed his Senior Cambridge examination and performed well while finishing the O-level and A-level qualifications from St. Patrick's High School. His father, Majeed Minhas, wanted his son, Rashid, to follow in his footsteps by attending the engineering university and strongly desired for his son to gain a degree in engineering after finishing his high school in Karachi. Against the wishes of his father, Rashid enrolled in the PAF School in Lower Topa in 1968, the Air Force's officer candidate school, completing his military training at the Pakistan Air Force Academy on 14 March 1971.

== Death ==
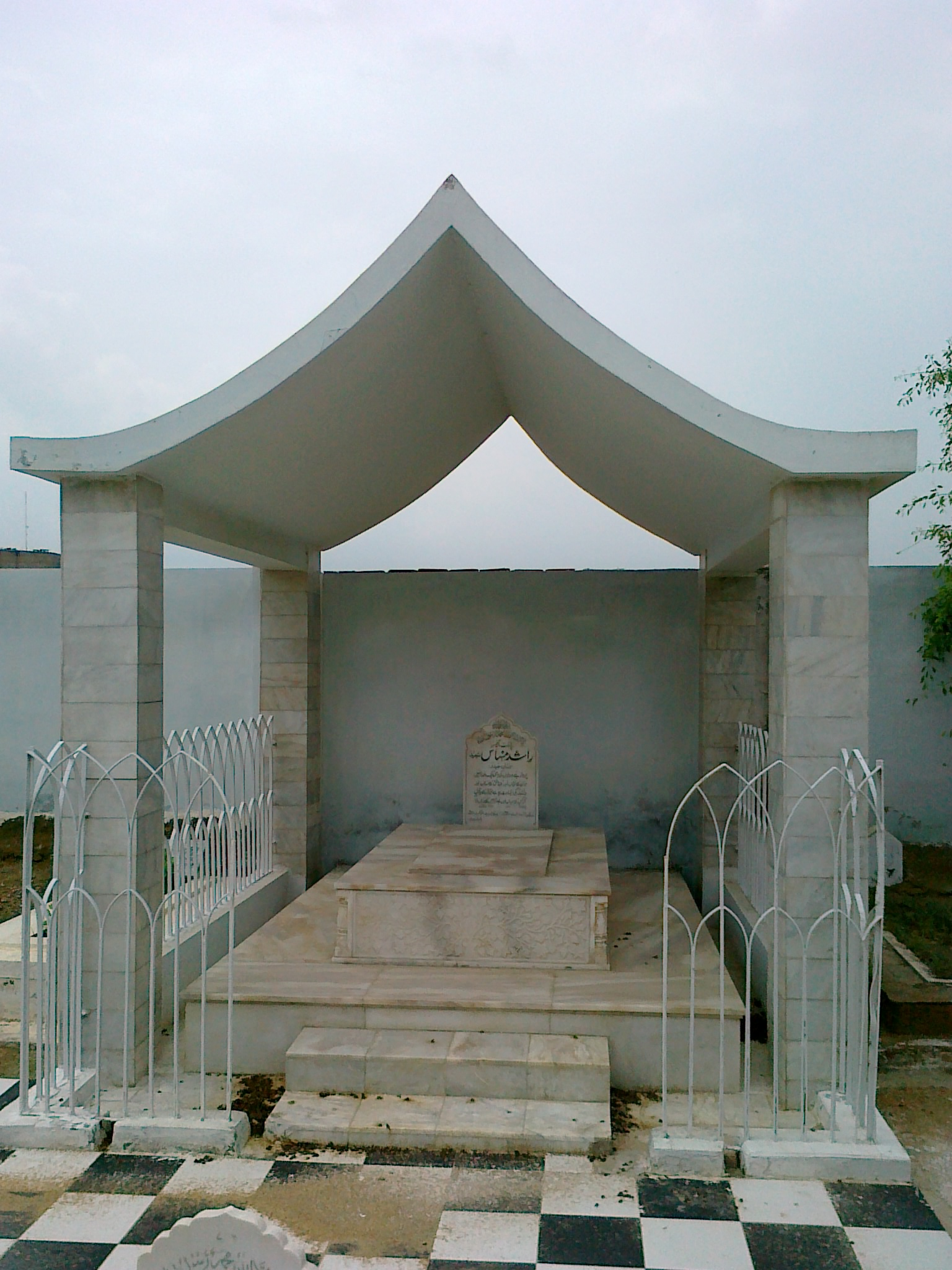
Grave of Rashid Minhas in Karachi

Upon graduation from Pakistan air Force Academy, Risalpur, Rashid Minhas and with his course mates ( 51st GDP Course) were transferred to Number 2 Squadron, for "Jet Conversion Training" on T-33 trainers, at PAF Base Masroor, Karachi. On 20 August of that year, in the hour before noon, he was getting ready to take off in a Lockheed T-33A T-Bird jet trainer in Karachi, Pakistan. His second solo flight in that type of aircraft. Minhas was taxiing his aircraft toward the runway when a Bengali instructor pilot, Flight Lieutenant Matiur Rahman, signalled him to stop and then climbed into the instructor's seat. The jet took off and Rahman turned towards India.

Minhas radioed PAF Base Masroor with the message that he was being hijacked. The air controller requested that he resend his message and he confirmed the hijacking. Later investigation showed that Rahman intended to defect to India to join the Bangladesh War of Independence, along with the jet trainer. In the air, Minhas struggled physically to wrest control from Rahman; both men tried to overpower the other through the mechanically linked flight controls. Some 32 miles (51 km) from the Indian border, the jet crashed near Sujawal. Both men were killed.

Minhas was posthumously awarded Pakistan's top military honour, the Nishan-e-Haider, and became the youngest man and the only member of the Pakistan Air Force to receive the award. Later, after Bangladesh was created, it gave its highest military award, the Bir Sreshtho, Rahman.

Minhas's Pakistan military citation for the Nishan-e-Haider states that he "forced the aircraft to crash" to prevent Rahman from taking the jet to India. This is the official, popular and widely known version of how Minhas died. Yawar A. Mazhar, a writer for Pakistan Military Consortium, relayed in 2004 that he spoke to retired PAF Group Captain Cecil Chaudhry about Minhas and that he learned more details not generally known to the public. According to Mazhar, Chaudhry led the immediate task of investigating the wreckage and writing the accident report. Chaudhry told Mazhar that he found the jet had hit the ground nose first, instantly killing Minhas in the front seat. Rahman's body, however, was not in the jet and the canopy was missing. Chaudhry searched the area and saw Rahman's body some distance behind the jet, the body found with severe abrasions from hitting the sand at a low angle and a high speed. Chaudhry thought that Minhas probably jettisoned the canopy at low altitude causing Rahman to be thrown from the cockpit because he was not strapped in. Chaudhry felt that the jet was too close to the ground at that time, too far out of control for Minhas to be able to prevent the crash.

== Citation of Gallantry ==
CITATION

PLT OFFR RASHID MINHAS

NO. 2 SQUADRON

On the morning of Friday, 20th August, 1971, Pilot Officer Rashid Minhas, a pilot still under training, was in the front seat of a jet trainer, taxing out for take off. An instructor pilot from the same unit forced his way into the rear cockpit, seized control of the aircraft and having taken off, headed the aircraft towards India. With just some 40 miles of Pakistan territory remaining, Minhas had only one course open to him to prevent his aircraft from entering India. Without hesitation, and living up to the highest traditions of the Pakistan Air Force, Rashid Minhas tried to regain control of his aircraft, but finding this to be impossible in the face of the superior skill and experience of his instructor, forced the aircraft to crash at a point 32 miles from the Indian border. In doing so Pilot Officer Minhas deliberately made the supreme sacrifice for the honour of Pakistan and the service to which he belonged. For this act of heroism above and beyond the call of duty, the President of Pakistan is pleased to award the Nishan-i-Haider to Pilot Officer Rashid Minhas.

== Legacy ==
After his death, Minhas was honoured as a national hero. In his memory, the Pakistan Air Force base at Kamra was renamed PAF Base Minhas, often called Minhas-Kamra. In Karachi, he was honoured by the naming of a main road, 'Rashid Minhas Road' (Urdu: شاہراہ راشد منہاس). A two-rupee postage stamp bearing his image was issued by Pakistan Post in December 2003; 500,000 were printed.

== Awards and decorations ==
Nishan-e-Haider Recipient
- Date: 1971
- Country: Islamic Republic of Pakistan
- Presented by: President Yahya Khan

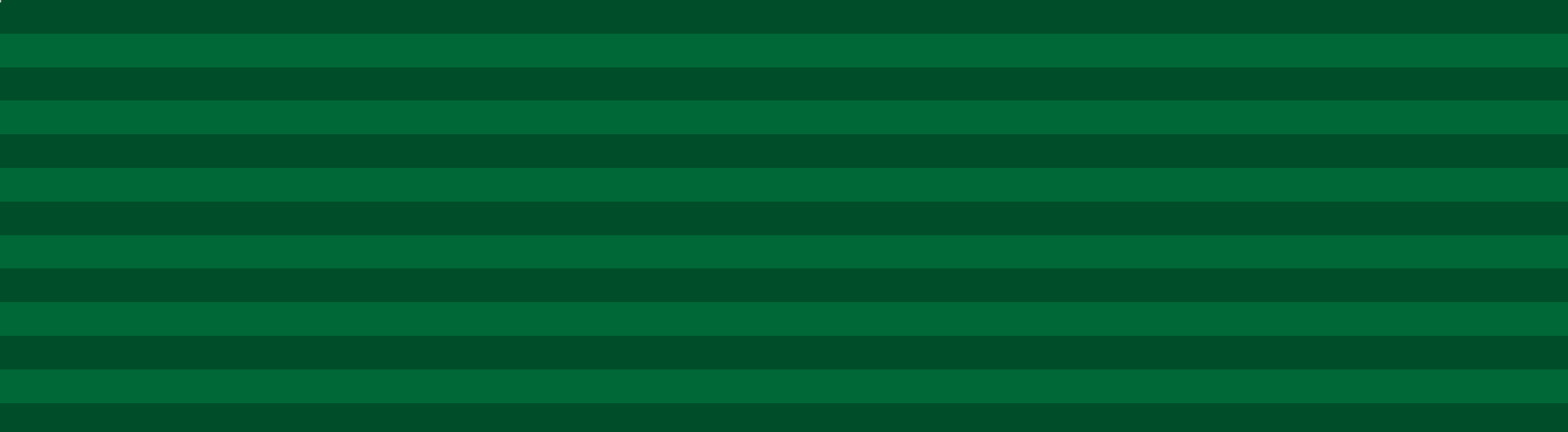

Nishan-e-Haider

(Emblem of the Lion)

1971 War

Posthumously

== See also ==
- Major Aziz Bhatti
- Squadron leader Sarfaraz Ahmed Rafiqui
- Squadron leader Muniruddin Ahmed
