= FS Hussain =

Pakistani pioneer aerobatic pilot and Air Commodore (1924–1969)

Air Commodore F.S. Hussain SBt TPk
- ایف ایس حسین
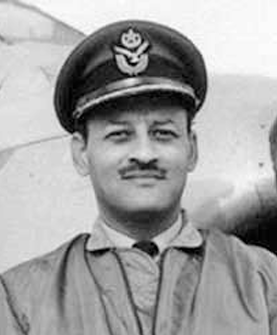
- Group Captain F.S. Hussain, 1965 war
- Born: Fuad Shahid Hussain; Lucknow, British India
- Died: 9 April 1969; CMH Peshawar, North-West Frontier Province, Pakistan
- Cause of death: Radiation poisoning
- Spouse: Zarina (m. 1943)
- Children: 2
- Military career
- Branch: Royal Indian Air Force (1944–1947); Pakistan Air Force (1947–1969)
- Service years: 1944–1969
- Rank: Air Commodore
- Nicknames: F.S. Prince of Pilots; The King of Fury
- Units: No. 151 OTU; No. 5 Squadron PAF
- Commands: Assistant Chief of Air Staff (Training), Pakistan Air Force; PAF Station Mauripur; No. 11 Squadron PAF; No. 5 Squadron PAF
- Conflicts: World War II; Burma campaign; Indo-Pakistani War of 1947; Bajaur Campaign; Indo-Pakistani War of 1965; Air war operations

Air Commodore Fuad Shahid Hussain (Note: Urdu: فواد شاہد حسین) SBt TPk (born March 19, 1920; died 9 April 1965), better known as FS Hussain, F.S., King of Fury, (Note: He was given this nickname for mastering the Hawker Sea Fury aircraft.) and the Prince of Pilots, was among the pioneer officers of the Pakistan Air Force, a fighter pilot, aerobatic pilot, and one-star rank air officer. He served as Assistant Chief of the Air Staff (Training) from December 1963 until his death in service during the 1965 war, for which he was posthumously awarded the Nishan-e-Haider.

Born in the United Provinces, Hussain graduated from La Martinière College, Lucknow and was commissioned into the Royal Indian Air Force in 1944. He later joined No. 4 Sqn, which was attached to the British Commonwealth Occupation Force in Japan, and deployed aboard an aircraft carrier. Assigned as an aerial photographer, he was responsible for capturing images of the aftermath of the Atomic bombings of Hiroshima and Nagasaki.

By 1947, he opted for the Royal Pakistan Air Force and was attached with No. 5 Sqn. Due to his prowess, he was selected for a course in the United Kingdom. He topped the course as a Category "A" Pilot Attack Instructor and set a Commonwealth record for air-to-air and air-to-ground shooting in 1949. The Commandant of the school remarked, "This officer who is a member of the Royal Pakistan Air Force for combat flying is outstanding in every way. He achieved the finest result in the air ever experienced in the Central Gunnery School, Leconfield England".

At an airshow in honour of The Shah's first visit to Pakistan in 1950, Hussain performed aerobatic manoeuvers in an Hawker Sea Fury. The Shah, who was impressed, requested to meet him and ordered his court poet to write a poem in his honour. By the early 1950s, he rapidly gained fame nationwide and internationally by his initials "F.S." At the Coronation of Elizabeth II, he performed solo aerobatics to which Arthur Tedder, Marshal of the Royal Air Force remarked, "A generation of pilots is yet to be born, who will try to achieve the standards already perfected by Flight Lieutenant FS Hussain of the RPAF". Wing Commanders F.S. and Mitty Masud trained the pilots who set the World record loop with 16 F-86 Sabres in 1958.

In early 1959, Group Captain F.S. Hussain was appointed Chief Inspector of Flight Safety. In the year that followed, flying accidents in the PAF reached an all-time low, with only one fatal accident. Air Marshal Asghar Khan, the Commander-in-Chief, expressed personal satisfaction with his inspection reports and congratulated him for this achievement. By the early 1960s, medical tests suggested Hussain had diabetes, but Air Marshal Asghar Khan dismissed the diagnosis. Fearing he would be grounded from flying as a result of his worsening health, F.S. hid his illness from his colleagues.

At the onset of the Indo-Pakistani War of 1965, Air Marshal Nur Khan appointed Hussain as the head of a committee formed to review operational plans. The PAF lacked the capability of night-time air defence which led to Khan assigning Hussain the task of developing night interception techniques. As a result, F-86 Sabres were integrated with AIM-9 Sidewinder missiles. These would prove effective with at least one confirmed victory against an Indian Canberra.

Air Commodore FS Hussain died in 1969. Sometime after his death, Air Commodore Riffat Mahmud, Director General of Medical Services of the PAF, visited the United States and took Hussain's blood samples to specialists of the United States Air Force. They found clear evidence of radiation poisoning and Mahmud shared the diagnosis with Hussain's family. Unbeknownst to Hussain, he had absorbed high levels of atomic radiation during his service in World War II, when he photographed the aftermath of Hiroshima and Nagasaki, unaware of the health risks. In the years that followed, neither the Pakistan Army Medical Corps nor the PAF possessed the medical knowledge to detect radiation-related illnesses, and his symptoms went unnoticed during his yearly health exams.

== Early life and education ==
Fuad received his early education from La Martinière College, Lucknow.

== Personal life ==
Fuad married Zarina and they had two children, son Zahid Hussain and daughter Ambreen, who died in 2005. Zahid is a businessman in Pakistan and founder of the organisation, KOPAF, (Note: lit. 'Kids of the PAF') a support group for the children of Pakistan Air Force personnel.

In the Journal of the Pakistan Air Force (1988), Squadron Leader MT Khan wrote: "in his physical handsomeness he (Fuad) resembled the first Station Commander of Drigh Road, Group Captain Charles Elworthy".

== Service years ==
=== Royal Indian Air Force (1944-1947) ===
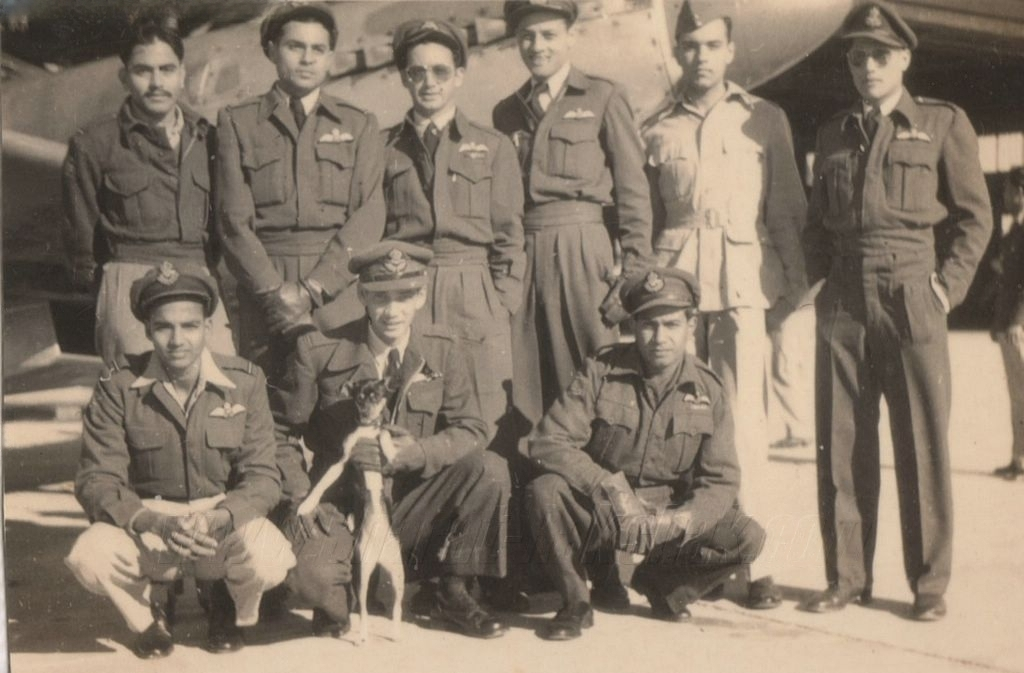
Officers of No. 4 Sqn: AIK Suares, Toric Zachariah, Leslie Prince Foster, FS Hussain, Rusi Cawasji Bahadurji, and Devaiah Subia Sitting: Muthukumarasami Balan, Andrew Wiseman with a stray dog, and Joseph Anthony Martin, Miho, Ibaraki, 1945

Commissioned into the Royal Indian Air Force on 4 September 1944, after graduating from the 26 Pilot Course of the Initial Training Wing in Poona, Hussain was attached to the No. 151 OTU in Risalpur.

By June 1945, he was assigned to No. 4 Sqn. The squadron was attached to the British Commonwealth Occupation Force in Imperial Japan, where they were deployed on an aircraft carrier. He was tasked with photographing the aftermath of the Atomic bombings of Hiroshima and Nagasaki.

==== Accidents ====
While performing unauthorised low aerobatics over Peshawar in his Hurricane IID on 15 March 1945, the aircraft struck a tree, damaging the propeller.

On 23 May 1945, he took off in a Spitfire VIII. After landing in Peshawar, he taxied into the Hurricane IIC of Flying Officer Bal Bhagwan Marathe at excessive speed from dispersal with extensive skin damage to the main plane and propeller.

=== Pakistan Air Force (1947-1969) ===
==== Nascent years ====
After the Partition of British India, he was amongst the few Muslim officers who opted for the Royal Pakistan Air Force (RPAF), and ultimately joined the No. 5 Sqn which formed on 15 August 1947 at Peshawar, where he equipped a Hawker Tempest aircraft and did his first solo flight.

On 21 March 1948, an air show in Lahore was organised to help promote the RPAF amongst Pakistanis. Flight Lieutenants Abdul Naeem Aziz and Abdur Rahim Khan, Flying Officers Masroor Hosain and Fuad Shahid Hussain took part in the formation. In the book "PAF Over the Years," Mushaf Ali Mir wrote that in his early days as a Flying Officer, Hussain's mastery of low-level aerobatics became legendary in the Air Force. He wrote: "manoeuvring just a few feet above the ground in a Hawker Fury, his propeller wash kicking up dust on the runway, or just missing the tree tops in a graceful 8-point roll, he made it all look like child's play."

At the first Pakistan Day parade in Lahore in 1948, he disguised himself as a mess hall attendant and rushed towards an aircraft, pretending to hijack it in an attempt to impress the founder of Pakistan, Muhammad Ali Jinnah. The radio commentator, who was in on the plan, added suspense. Hussain acted like a novice pilot, pulling off risky moves and pretended that he was about to crash into the ground several times. Near the end of the performance, he flew close to Jinnah, saluting him while he was inverted.

After the Air Force purchased the Hawker Sea Fury, Flight Lieutenant Hussain ferried the aircraft from the United Kingdom to Sargodha, in early 1949.

By April 1949, he won the first position in the Pilot Attack Instructors course at the Central Gunnery School Leconfield as a Category "A" Pilot Attack Instructor, while setting a commonwealth record in air-to-air shooting. The Commandant of the school remarked that Hussain achieved the finest result in the air ever experienced at the school.

In May 1949, No. 5 Sqn and No. 9 Sqn faced each other for the first Perry-Keene Trophy, in an inter-squadron armament competition. No. 5 Sqn was victorious and the team consisted of Squadron Leader Aziz ur Rehman Khan, Flight Lieutenant Fuad Shahid Hussain, and Flying Officers Imtiaz Hussain Agha and Stefan Tronczyński.

In Peshawar, on 12 December 1949, the RPAF held a performance to support its welfare fund, attended by over 50,000 people. Hussain was among several pilots who performed. He flew a Hawker Sea Fury and his first act was a roll while climbing vertically, known as a "vertical Charlie". (Note: "a high-speed climb followed by a sudden transition into a vertical roll. The aircraft appears to momentarily defy gravity, ascending almost straight up before completing a full 360-degree roll at the peak of its climb.") He then executed a series of half rolls, rocket loops, eight-point rolls, slow and successive rolls, and demonstrated inverted flying. His performance garnered loud applause from the spectators.

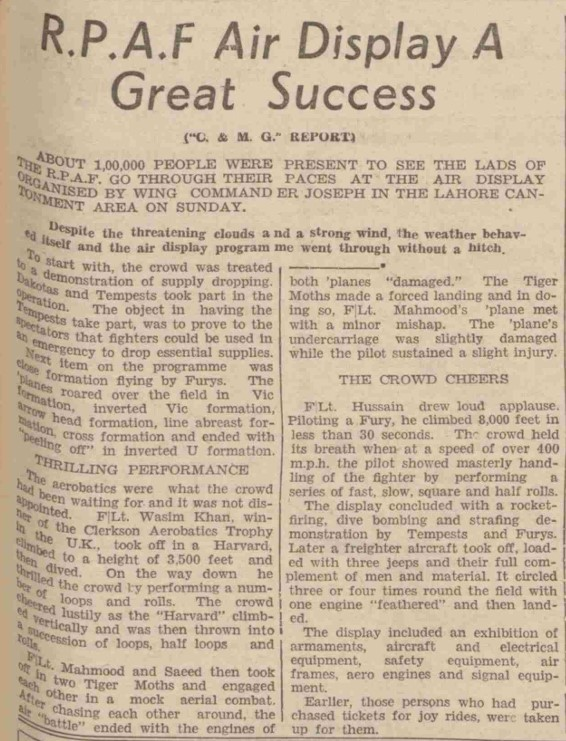
Newspaper from the performance, 1950

On 5 February 1950, Flight Lieutenant Hussain was one of the pilots who participated in the RPAF's 'At Home' air display in Lahore Cantonment, organised by Wing Commander S.A. Joseph, which was attended by approximately 100,000 people. Hussain drew loud applause as he piloted a Hawker Sea Fury, climbing 8,000 feet in less than 30 seconds. The crowd held its breath as he masterfully handled the fighter, performing a series of fast, slow, square, and half rolls at speeds exceeding 500 mph.

That year on 2 March at PAF Base Risalpur, he took off in a Hawker Sea Fury and performed an aerobatic display in honour of The Shah of Pahlavi Iran. The Shah who was an amateur pilot, was deeply impressed by Hussain's manoeuvres executed incredibly close to the ground, and requested for a personal meeting with Hussain and later ordered his court poet to write a poem in his honour.

By the early 1950s, he was rapidly gaining fame throughout Pakistan and internationally as "F.S.", and became a role model for fighter pilots in the Air Force. In November 1951, F.S. Hussain was promoted to Squadron Leader and succeeded Julian Kazimierz Żuromski as Commander No. 5 Sqn. Under his leadership, the squadron won the Perry Keene Inter Squadron Armament Trophy on 12 February 1952.

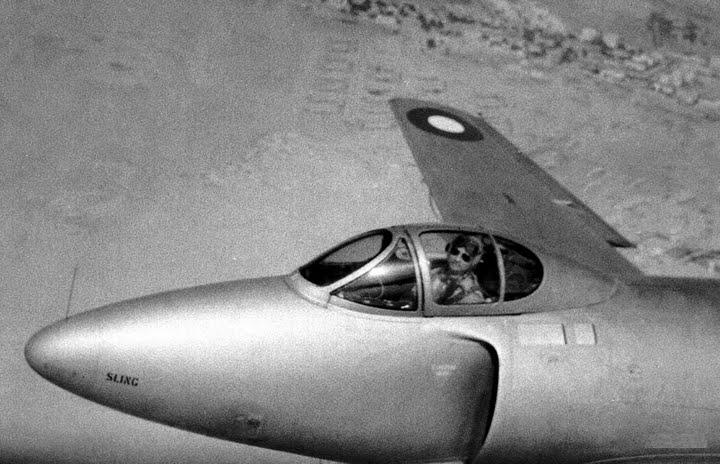
Aerial shot of F.S. ferrying a Supermarine Attacker to Pakistan (1951)

When the RPAF began to acquire jet aircraft, he was chosen by the high command as the leader of the two pilots, to ferry fly Supermarine Attackers from the United Kingdom to Pakistan. He led the two other Pakistani pilots along a lengthy route over Istres, Malta, the Gulf of Aden, Nicosia, Baghdad, finally arriving in Karachi. Thereafter, the newly inducted attacker aircraft were commissioned into No. 11 Sqn, earning him the accolade of being the pioneer of jet fighter flying in the air force.

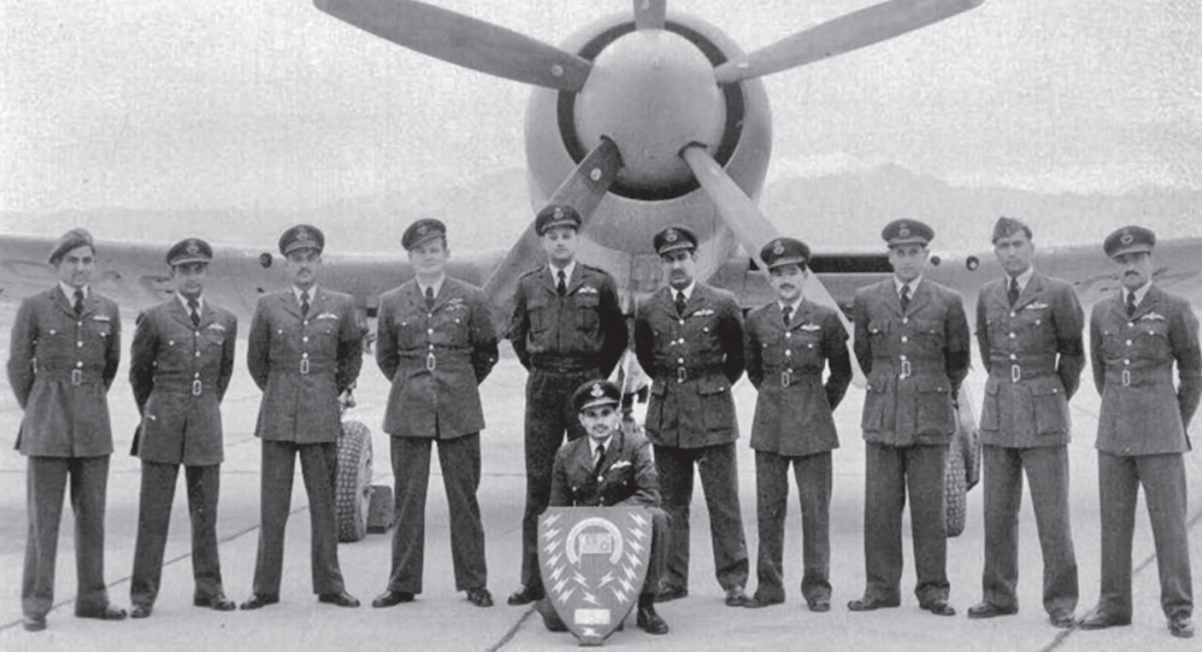
Commander F.S. Hussain (standing center), alongside his officers, after they won the Perry Keene Inter-squadron armament trophy (1952)

In April 1953, Salahuddin took over as Officer Commanding No. 5 Sqn and FS Hussain was appointed commander No. 11 Sqn, succeeding Abdur Rahim Khan. The squadron was equipped with the Supermarine Attackers at Drigh Road, under station commander Group Captain Cheema. Additionally, Hussain was appointed Flight Commander of the squadron and tasked with operationalising the aircraft and training the crew. He also formed the first jet aerobatic team, known as the Paybills, who showcased their skills in a performance at the end of 1952.

In June 1953, F.S. left a lasting impression at the Coronation of Elizabeth II, where his daredevil solo aerobatics enthralled the crowd. After the performance, former Marshal of the Royal Air Force Arthur Tedder remarked, "A generation of pilots is yet to be born, who will try to achieve the standards already perfected by Flt Lt FS Hussain of the RPAF." In July 1955, Mitty Masud succeeded FS Hussain as commander No. 11 Sqn.

Sometime in 1956, several Pakistani officers including F.S. were sent to the German Air Force Officer Training School at NATOs Fürstenfeldbruck Air Base. He was the first amongst them to go solo on a Lockheed T-33 Shooting Star after two dual missions. Once bored with elementary training, F.S. planned an aerobatic session with Sajad Haider. They rendezvoused near a lake, and F.S. directed Sajad through loops and rolls in formation. This unauthorised display caught the attention of the United States Air Force (USAF) radar and frequency monitoring team. Major Smallen of the USAF, summoned the 100 international students to a briefing room, where he also reprimanded FS and stated: "Now there are some hot-rods around here that make me uncomfortable. Today, you Major Hoosain (FS Hussain) violated the basic tenet of flying safety; I can send you packing home and you can do all the low-level aerobatics you want and I know you are damned good at it, but it won't work here. However, I will ground you for one week and you can cool your shins." Haider noted that the incident became a talking point at the training base. F.S. Hussain completed the course without further issues and was among 10 Pakistani pilots who were selected to proceed to the US for further training. Later, while training in Canada, he had flown inverted through a hangar in a Hawker Sea Fury.

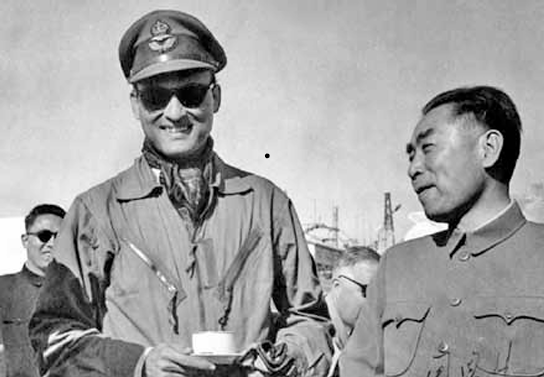
F.S. Hussain with Premier Zhou Enlai after the air show (1956)

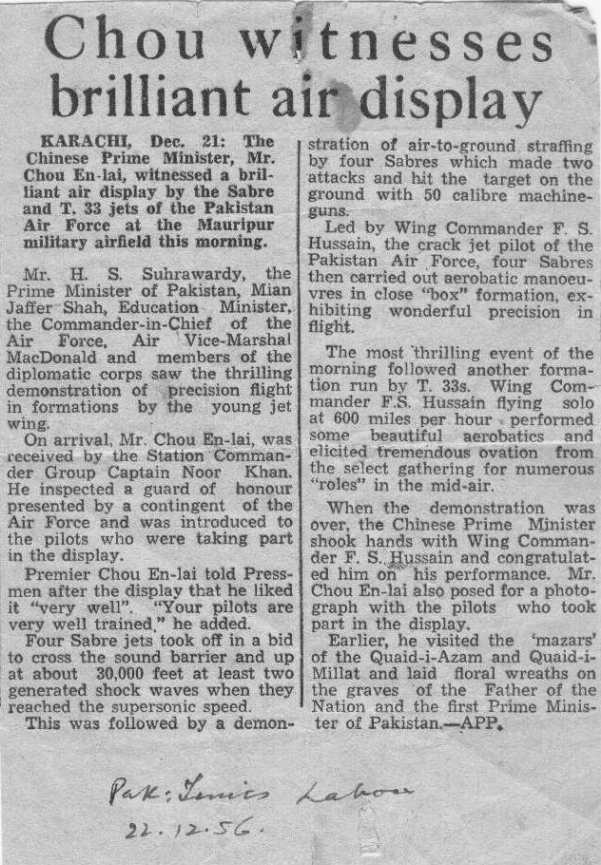
Newspaper from the airshow (1956)

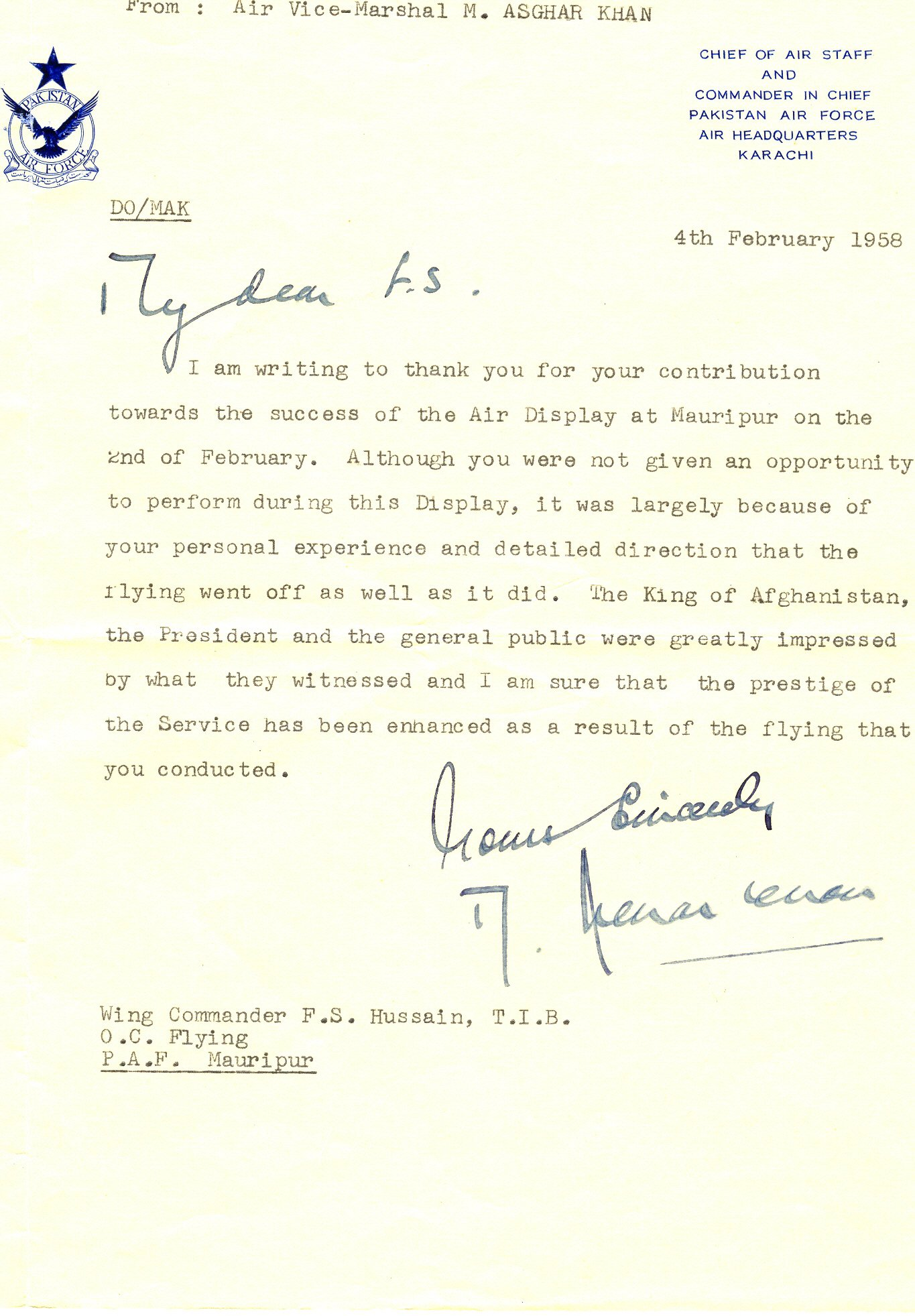
Air Vice-Marshal Asghar Khan's letter to Hussain following the World record loop (1958)

By late 1956, he was promoted to Wing Commander and appointed commander of the Flying Wing stationed at PAF Station Mauripur. On 22 December 1956, he rose to fame once more by captivating the Karachi crowd with his signature slow roll and inverted pull-up performed at low altitude, flying solo at 600 mph. In the audience was Chinese Premier Zhou Enlai, who was on his inaugural official visit to Pakistan. Witnessing his aerobatics, Premier Zhou Enlai was impressed and requested Prime Minister H. S. Suhrawardy for a personal meeting with F. S. Hussain to commend him for his performance.

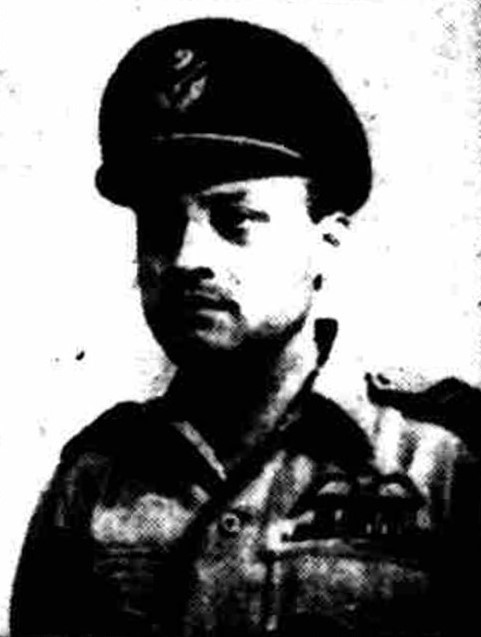
Wing Commander F.S. Hussain, c. 1956-59

Despite not having the chance to participate in the World record loop of 1958, he received an appreciation letter from Air Vice Marshal Asghar Khan for training the pilots who achieved the feat. After graduating from the RAF Staff College, Andover, F.S. Hussain was promoted to Group Captain and appointed Chief Inspector of Flight Safety of the PAF on 25 April 1959.

During the six months prior to July 1960, flying accidents in the PAF reached an all-time low, with only one accident involving a loss of life and several units and squadrons not experiencing any mishaps at all. Air Marshal Asghar Khan congratulated Chief Inspector Group Captain F.S. Hussain for this achievement, expressing personal satisfaction with his inspection reports. Emphasising the need to maintain and exceed the safety standards, Khan announced plans to introduce further measures, which included creating an accident research section in the Chief Inspectorate of the PAF to explore various issues. Hussain's half-yearly report, presented at the PAF Headquarters, revealed that fatal accidents had been reduced to one, involving a Harvard aircraft from Quetta, with no major mishaps in jets, transport planes, or training aircraft despite increased flying hours.

From December 1961 to January 1964, Hussain commanded PAF Station Mauripur. Among his students were MM Alam, Alauddin Ahmed, Yunus Hussain, Muniruddin, Sarfaraz Ahmed Rafiqui, Saiful Azam, Nazir Latif, and others.

In April 1965, Group Captain Hussain as Air Secretary at Air Headquarters (AHQ), was among four staff officers who accompanied Air Commodore Abdur Rahim Khan, the Assistant Chief of Air Staff (Operations), to his visit to the United States Air Defense Command, North American Air Defense Command, and the USAF Academy.

==== 1965 War ====
With the onset of the war, Group Captain F.S. Hussain was now a senior commander at AHQ. Air Marshal Nur Khan, the Commander-in-Chief, formed a committee led by FS Hussain to review and improve operational plans.

The committee was tasked with gaining local air superiority to support the Pakistan Army and prevent the Indian Air Force (IAF) from aiding the Indian Army, recommending methods to neutralise the IAF's numerical superiority, plan for efficient defence of air bases and maximum support for the army, propose strategies for enemy harassment without compromising PAF effectiveness, and ensure logistical plans supported operational goals.

After the committee's deliberations, Nur Khan made several key decisions. He concentrated the PAF around Sargodha and Peshawar, leaving one squadron for the air defence of Karachi, and planned to fight the air superiority battle by defending PAF Station Sargodha to maximise force economy and safeguard key assets. He ordered immediate attacks on Indian air bases after hostilities began, to destroy IAF aircraft on the ground and provoke retaliatory attacks where the PAF's defences were strongest. Airborne commandos were to be deployed to sabotage IAF bases on the first night of conflict, and the number of missions per aircraft per day was to be increased to reduce the disparity in air power.

Nur Khan also planned for combat air patrols using a combination of F-104 Starfighters and F-86 Sabres, both armed with AIM-9 Sidewinder missiles, and ensured that air defense measures were fully operational in anticipation of hostilities. At least one squadron was to be maintained for close support of the Army. He ordered repeated single bomber raids on enemy air bases to keep them under constant alert, and directed the use of training and non-operational aircraft for night attacks on enemy logistics and troop concentrations.

The PAF's concern about its lack of night-time air defence led Nur Khan to assign FS Hussain to Peshawar to develop night interception techniques using the F-86 Sabre. Success came with the integration of Sidewinder missiles on the F-86. Though this was a temporary solution aimed more at deterring the IAF Canberra crews than ensuring their interception, it proved effective. Achieving visual contact at night was nearly impossible, and the missile's tone was not always a reliable lock-on indicator. Despite these limitations, the F-86's role as a night-fighter was validated by at least one confirmed victory against an IAF English Electric Canberra.

==== Post-war ====
Following the war, he was promoted to the rank of Air Commodore and Air Marshal Nur Khan assigned him the task of establishing a flight safety institute within the PAF. FS Hussain dedicated himself to this endeavour, working diligently to achieve it within a short timeframe. He visited the United States to undergo a course on Air Force flight safety and accident investigation. On his return, he spearheaded the establishment of the Flight Safety setup within the Air Headquarters (AHQ). FS Hussain is credited with the current flight safety framework of the PAF as it stands today.

In May 1966, Air Commodore FS Hussain was appointed as the Assistant Chief of Air Staff (Operations). Later that year, he attended the Imperial Defence College and graduated in 1968. On his return to Pakistan, he was appointed Assistant Chief of the Air Staff (Training) at the AHQ in December 1968.

===== Illness and death =====
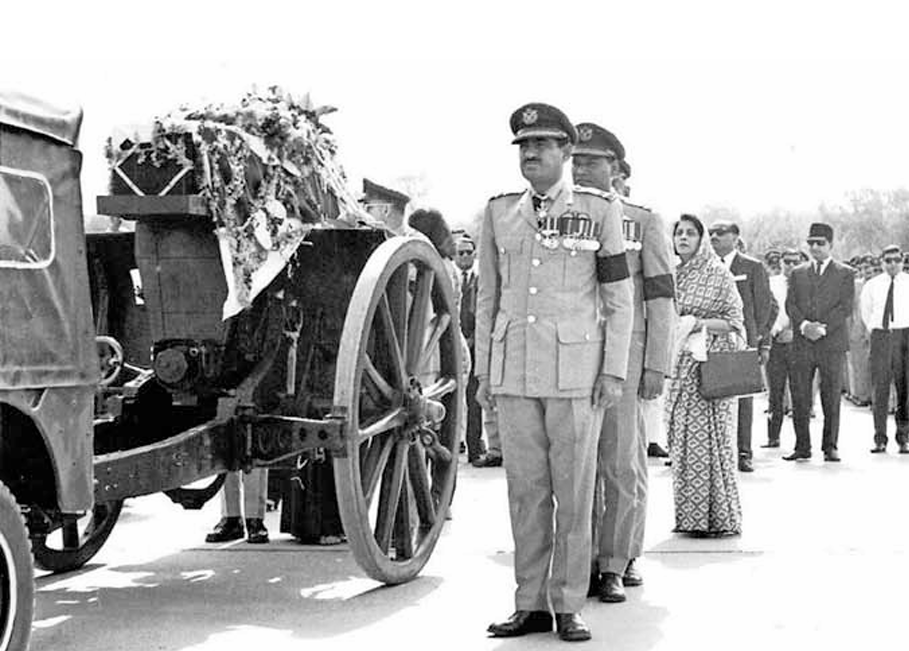
Air Commodores Abdur Rahim Khan, Eric G. Hall, and other officers escort the coffin of FS Hussain. His sister, Attia, can also be seen, 1969

During World War II, FS Hussain's squadron was part of the British Commonwealth Occupation Force to Japan, where they were deployed on an aircraft carrier. FS photographed all the wrecked areas but during those days, no one was aware of radiation. The Pakistan Army Medical Corps had no previous experience or knowledge of nuclear radiation or poisoning and as a result, this was not detected in his yearly flying medical test.

Before 1965, tests suggested he had diabetes but Air Marshal Asghar Khan overrode the reports. F.S. Hussain, afraid of being grounded from flying, hid his illness from his colleagues. He died on 9 April 1969 at CMH Peshawar and was buried at the PAF Graveyard in Peshawar.

Years later, his family moved to the United Kingdom. Sometime afterwards, Air Commodore Riffat Mahmud, Director General Medical Services of the Pakistan Air Force, took FS Hussain's blood samples to the United States during a visit to United States Air Force medical facilities. The PAF had been unable to identify the cause of Hussain's kidney failure. However, the US medical specialist identified the slides as characteristic of radiation poisoning. Mahmud later informed Hussain's family of this diagnosis during his visit to London.

== Memorials ==
The yearly trophy awarded to the Best Flight Safety Officer of the Pakistan Air Force is named after FS Hussain.

In the book, "Shamsheer Se Zanjeer Tak," (Retd) Colonel Mirza Hassan Khan recalled that F.S. Hussain was assigned to fly him to Gilgit in an emergency when enemy Indian fighter aircraft were present in the sky during the India–Pakistan war of 1947–1948. He described how they encountered six enemy fighters en-route and how Hussain "bravely flew the Harvard at a very low level", just above the River Indus, through treacherous high mountains. At a dangerous point, Hussain instructed Khan to get ready to jump out of the plane. Khan added that he had never seen anyone as brave as pilot F.S. Hussain.

In the book, "Flight of the Falcon," (Retd) Air Commodore Sajad Haider wrote: "FS Hussain, the greatest fighter pilot PAF ever had. He would loop an Attacker or F-86 inverted all the way, and at Karachi flying club we witnessed him do these very crazy manoeuvres in a Tiger Moth bi-plane, spin it from 2000 feet and scare the crap out of us. But every second and inch during manoeuvres, he was in total control. God bless his soul."

(Retd) Air Marshal Zafar Chaudhry in his memoir, "Mosaic of Memory," wrote: "FS was totally dedicated to his profession and had only one desire and ambition in life: to stay in the flying business. Thus, when he started developing a physical disorder rather early in life, his reaction was to conceal it and to ignore it so that it should not lead to his being removed from flying status- a situation he was simply not prepared to accept. His love for flying far exceeded his concern for his own well-being; he simply could not imagine a life without the thrill of flying and, therefore, continued to pretend that all was well. The insidious malady remained untreated and, tragically, by the time it became obvious, it had already passed the stage of treatment. The Prince of Pilots died when still short of 45-leaving the PAF and the world of flying so much the poorer."

== Effective dates of promotion ==
Insignia	Rank	Date
	Air Commodore	1965 (Note: Promoted after the 1965 War.)
	Group Captain	25 April 1959
	Wing Commander	1956
	Squadron Leader	November 1951
	Flight Lieutenant	1949
	Flying Officer	4 October 1945
	Pilot Officer	4 September 1944

== Awards and decorations ==
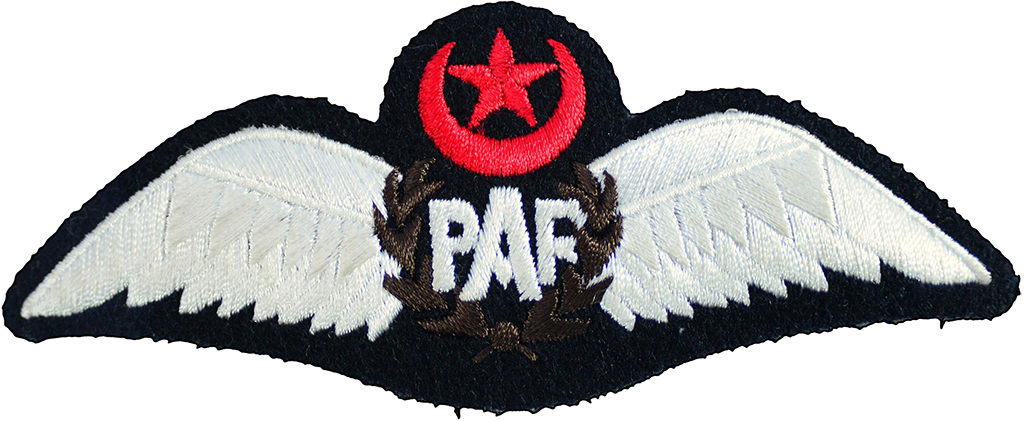

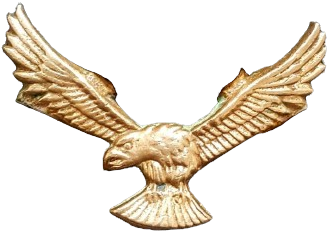

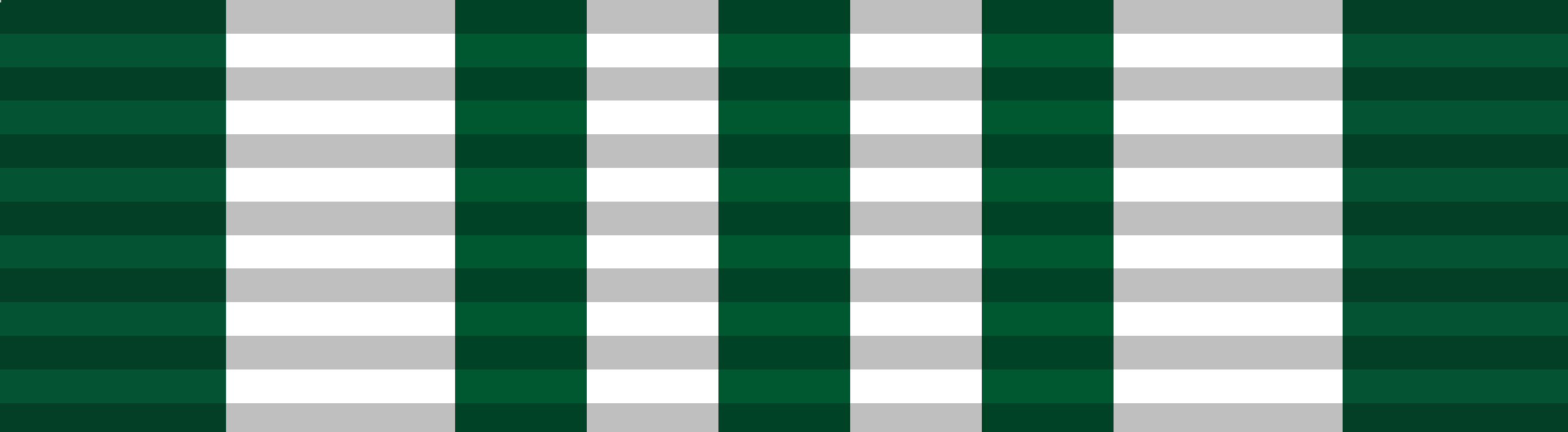

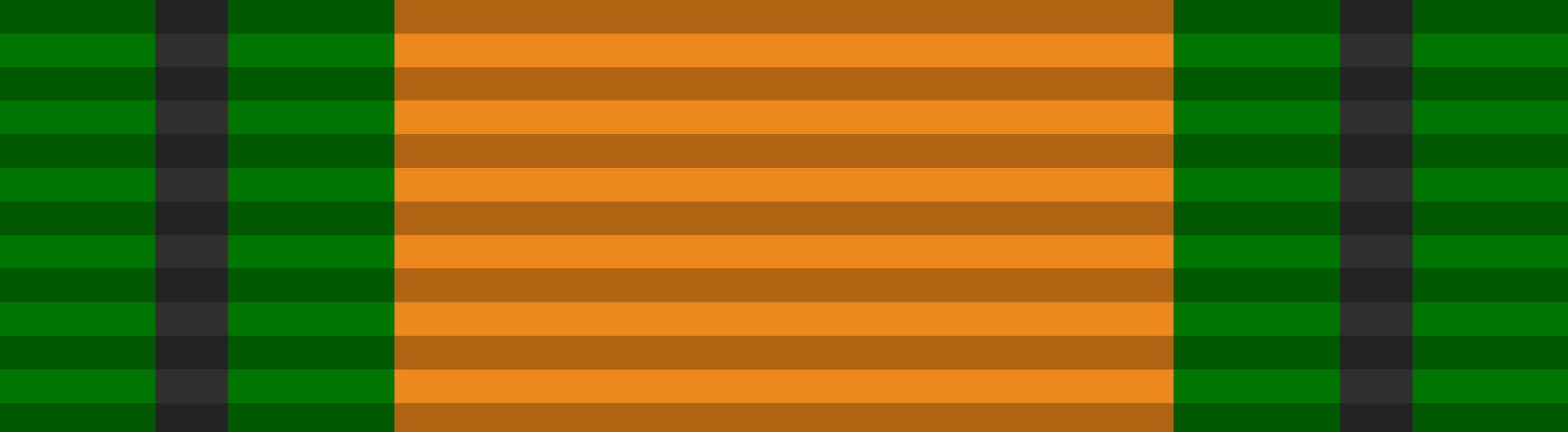

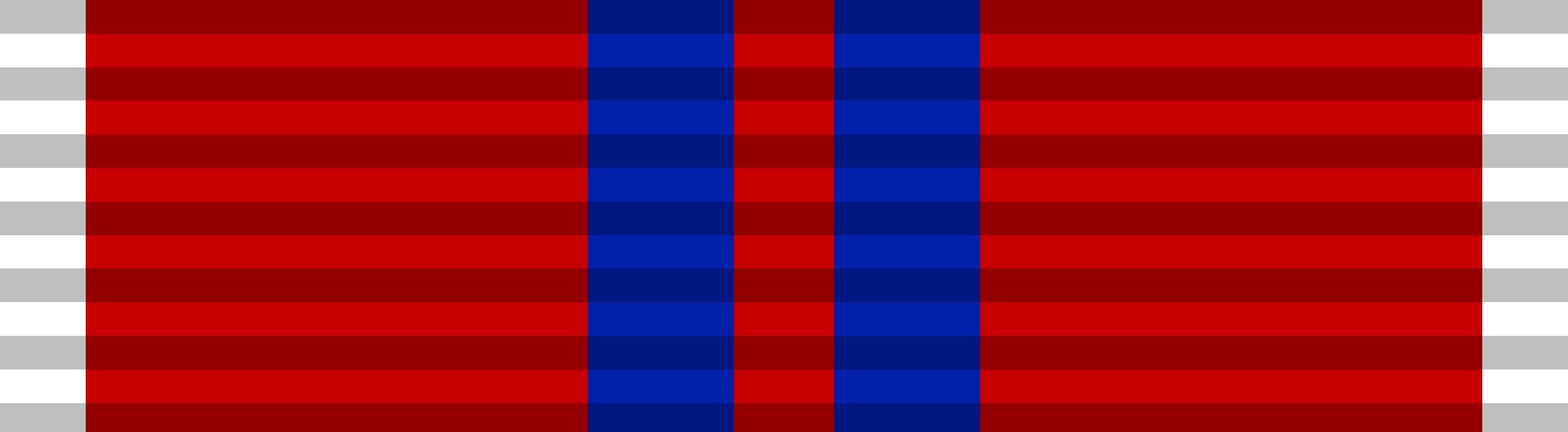

PAF GD(P) Badge RED (More than 3000 Flying Hours)
Golden Eagle Award (Pakistan) (Exceptional Fighter Pilot)
Sitara-e-Basalat (Star of Valour); 1957		Tamgha-i-Pakistan (Member of the Order of Pakistan); 1961	
Tamgha-e-Diffa (Defence Medal): 1. 1947–1948 War Clasp; 2. Bajaur Campaign Clasp	Sitara-e-Harb 1965 War (War Star 1965)	Tamgha-e-Jang 1965 War (War Medal 1965)	Pakistan Medal 1947
Burma Star	Defence Medal	War Medal 1939–1945	Queen Elizabeth II Coronation Medal (1953)
