= Shabina Mustafa =

Pakistani social entrepreneur

- Born: Kolkatta, India.
- Education: Bachelor's in Sociology
- Alma mater: University of Karachi (1972)
- Occupation: Social entrepreneur
- Organization: The Garage School
- Spouse: Flight Lieutenant Syed Safi Mustafa
- Children: Syed Zain Mustafa

Shabina Mustafa is a Pakistani social entrepreneur and the founder of The Garage School located in Neelum Colony, Karachi which educates underprivileged children in Karachi who cannot afford education.

== Education ==
Shabina did her bachelor's in Sociology from University of Karachi in 1972.

== Life ==
Shabina Mustafa was born in Calcutta, British India (now Kolkata, India). In her childhood, Shabina moved to East Pakistan (now Bangladesh). She was the youngest amongst her five siblings. Shabina studied at St. Francis Xavier's Convent and Holy Cross College. She later married Flight Lieutenant Syed Safi Mustafa. Shabina was studying in her university when she received the news of her husband being missing in action in 1971. Shabina was married to him for only eighteen months. She was 21 at the time and had one child. Shabina however continued her education at the University of Karachi.

After graduating, Shabina found work as a teacher at the Pakistan Air Force Base Masroor, Mauripur. She and her son Syed Zain Mustafa, lived in a one-bedroom apartment initially. Shabina then moved to her current house after she was able to sell her land. Shabina then worked as a reservations agent at Saudi Arabian Airlines for 32 years.

It was Shabina's husband's dream to open a school for the underprivileged kids in the community. However, with his gone missing, Shabina worried that her husband's dream will not come true. In 1999, Shabina encountered a girl who was refused admission in a sewing class because she could not read or write. Her mother asked Shabina for help and if she could teach her daughter and other children of the neighborhood in her garage. This inspired Shabina to open a learning space for children who could not afford education and she started teaching children in her garage. The first class started with 14 children.

Initially, Shabina's school had no funding and no furniture or classroom material. Shabina's friends saved her some wood, stones, pencils and scrape paper to be used for the school. Shabina also made her own hand drawn exercise books for use. Shabina would go for work in the morning and then come back to teach the children in the afternoon. Ghazala Nizami, principal of Happy Home School, sent Shabina stationery and exercise books. Some schools also donated newspapers which Shabina sold to buy stationery for her school. Shabina then started seeking out sponsors for her new school. She rented a bigger space to cater more children. As more funding reached her school, Shabina started a medical programme, adult literacy programme, teacher trainings and food programmes.

By 2002, Shabina's school was becoming overcrowded. Shabina's friend, Abbas Vawda got to know of Shabina's initiative and he started supporting 10 children annually.

In 2006, the Safi Benevolent Trust took over the Garage School and started supporting it for its expansion. Shabina is the president of the board of trustees at Safi benevolent trust since 1999.

The Garage school now comprises three floors. It has now provided education to more than 500 students. The school is located in Neelum Colony. The children have access to education as well as clean water, nutritional diet, medicines and health benefits. The school also holds an annual theatre show which gives the students residing in slums an opportunity at extracurriculars. The school also organizes field trips for the children.

Shabina's school follows a five finger formula which is also the mission of the school: “Taur (Training), Tareeqa (Approach), Tarbiat (Grooming), Taleem (Education) and Tarraqi (Progress)."

The Garage School operates in three shifts. The morning shift takes regular students from pre-nursery level to 10th grade and prepares them for Aga Khan board and Sindh board exam.

== Awards ==
Shabina received the Azm Award in 2011 for her work in education.
