= Masroor Hosain =

Pakistani air commodore (1922–1967)

Air Commodore Masroor Hosain SPk
- مسرور حسین
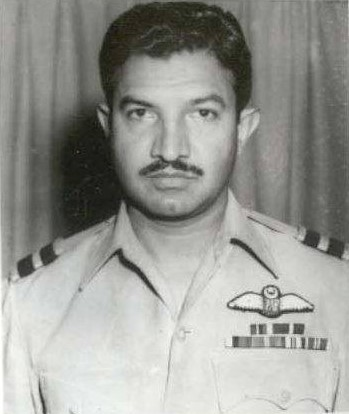
- Official portrait, c. 1964

Commander PAF Station Mauripur
- In office February 1966 – 24 May 1967

Commander PAF Station Sargodha
- In office 3 June 1961 – January 1962

Commander PAF Station Peshawar
- In office April 1960 – 2 June 1961
- In office August 1956 – November 1956

Officer Commanding No. 14 Squadron PAF
- In office November 1951 – September 1955

Personal details
- Born: 29 December 1922 Bulandshahr, Uttar Pradesh, British India
- Died: 24 May 1967 (aged 44) Karachi, West Pakistan
- Cause of death: Bird strike to aircraft canopy
- Spouse: Mehr Nigar Aziz
- Children: 2
- Education: Aligarh Muslim University; RAF Central Flying School

Military service
- Branch/service: Royal Indian Air Force (1944-1947); Pakistan Air Force (1947-1967)
- Years of service: 1944–1967
- Rank: Air Commodore
- Commands: PAF Station Mauripur; AOC Air Defence Sakesar; Senior Air Staff Officer Air Defence HQ; PAF Station Sargodha; PAF Station Peshawar; No. 5 Squadron PAF
- Battles/wars: Indo-Pakistani War of 1965; Air war operations
- Awards: See list

Air Commodore Masroor Hosain (Note: Urdu: مسرور حسین) (29 December 1922 – 24 May 1967) was a Pakistani one-star rank air officer who was among the pioneer officers of the Pakistan Air Force, aerobatic pilot, and fighter pilot.

Born in Bulandshahr, Hosain graduated from the Aligarh Muslim University and joined the Royal Indian Air Force in 1944. After the Partition of British India, he opted for the Royal Pakistan Air Force (RPAF) in August 1947. As a Flight Lieutenant, Hosain attended the RAF Central Flying School in England and won the Clarksons Aerobatics Trophy in 1949. In the summer of 1952, Squadron Leader Hosain was the captain of the RPAF's Hockey team during their tour to Australia and New Zealand.

On 24 May 1967, Hosain was conducting a low-level training mission. While approaching runway 27 at PAF Station Mauripur in his B-57 Canberra at a low altitude, a vulture impacted his canopy and killed him instantly. His flight navigator, Flight Lieutenant Subhan, safely ejected. Hosain managed to steer the aircraft towards a field to avoid a residential area and hit the ground at high speed. The debris of the aircraft was flung over a vast area and two employees of the Karachi Development Authority (KDA) were killed on the ground. His death was noted as a significant loss for the PAF.

He was mentioned in the diary of Field Marshal Ayub Khan, while his close friend Air Marshal Asghar Khan, wrote an obituary for him in The Pakistan Times, and Air Marshal Nur Khan sent his condolences to his widow.

On 24 May 1968, PAF Station Mauripur was renamed to PAF Station Masroor in his honour.

== Early life ==
Masroor Hosain was born on 29 December 1922 in Bulandshahr into a Muslim family to Manzoor Hosain and Qudsiya Begum. Following the Partition of British India in August 1947, the family moved to Pakistan.

== Personal life ==
His younger brother, Khurshid Haider (1925–1995) was a Major General in the Pakistan Army.

Masroor Hosain married Mehr Nigar Abdul Aziz in 1962. She was the daughter of Mahmood Jahan and the famous Urdu writer, Khan Bahadur Abdul Aziz who was better known by his pen name Falak Paima. The couple were close friends with Quaid-e-Azam and Fatima Jinnah.

Masroor and Mehr had two children, daughter Jolie Asfareen and son Fareed Masroor Hosain. Mehr was Pakistan's leading choreographer and the Director of the Pakistan International Airlines (PIA) Arts Academy when Air Marshal Asghar Khan was heading the airline in 1968. Mehr presented a bouquet to Queen Elizabeth II during a PIA culture show, Sons of the River. In the 1970s, Governor Ra'ana Liaquat Ali Khan hosted Mehr's ballet "Lalkar" to a Chinese delegation at the Governor's House, Karachi.

Mehr died from terminal cancer in 1986, shortly after completing her book, Shadows of Time: A Novel, which was posthumously published in 1987.

Masroor Hosain's cousin, Major General S. Wajahat Husain, also served in the Pakistan Army. His nephew, S. Mazhar Abbas retired as an Air Commodore of the Pakistan Air Force, while another nephew, Captain Syed Hassan Zaheer of the Pakistan Army was killed in action in the 1971 War and posthumously received the Sitara-e-Jurat.

== Service years ==
=== Royal Indian Air Force ===
After graduating from the Aligarh Muslim University, Masroor Hosain was commissioned into the Royal Indian Air Force (RIAF) on 4 September 1944 as part of the 26th Course of the Initial Training Wing in Poona.

On 12 February 1947, Flying Officer Masroor Hosain took off in a Spitfire FR Mk XIV from Ambala Air Force Station. The engine cut off in mid-air and the aircraft was belly-landed near Nizampur, Panipat, 8 miles from takeoff. The forced belly landing severely damaged the fuselage due to the aircraft sliding along the rough ground at high speed. The aircraft was damaged beyond repair and Hosain survived.

=== Pakistan Air Force ===
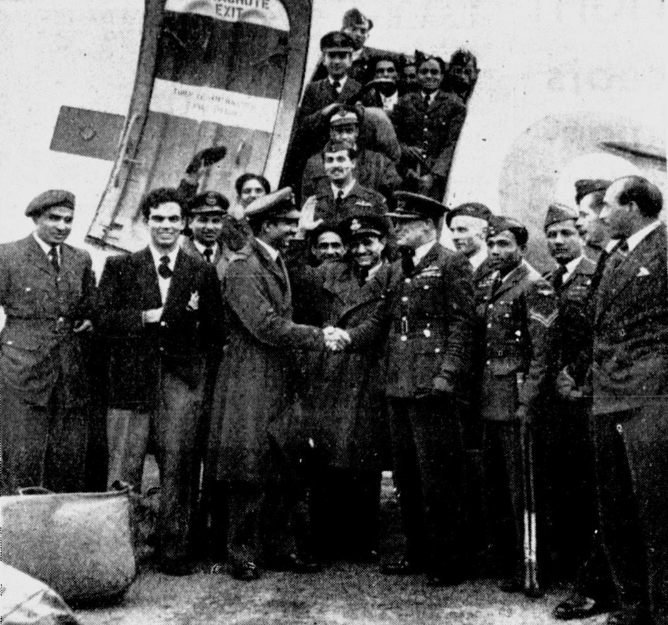
Acting Commanding Officer RAAF Point Cook Group Captain A. Earle (right) welcomes the visitors' officer-in-charge, Squadron Leader Masroor Hosain, 1952

Following the Partition of British India in August 1947, the Royal Pakistan Air Force (RPAF) was allotted eight Tiger Moth aircraft from RIAF's Elementary Flying Training School at Jodhpur. The team consisting of Squadron Leader Stephen Aratoon Joseph, Flying Officers Masroor Hosain and Zafar Chaudhry, Officer Cadets Saleem-el-Edroos, Asaf Khan Chaudhry and S.M. Ahmad, was tasked to ferry them across to Risalpur. After a briefing by the leader, the formation took off in the early hours of 12 September 1947.

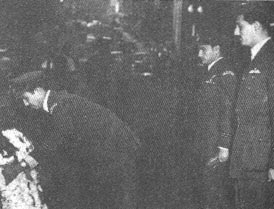
Squadron Leader Hosain lays a wreath at the Tomb of the Unknown Soldier in Sydney, summer of 1952

It was rare that trainees with less than a hundred hours of flying experience were required to ferry aircraft over a long and difficult route. Moreover, the aircraft were to be flown in formation and the cadets had not practiced the formation flying. At their third stop in Nawabshah, thousands crowded the airfield despite the stifling heat. The fact that the aircraft now belonged to Pakistan excited the crowd immensely. They spent the night in a local rest-house.

The next morning, 20 minutes after taking off for Jacobabad, Stephen Aratoon Joseph's aircraft force-landed in the desert due to a "dead engine." The remaining six aircraft continued to Multan via Khanpur, arriving barely before sunset. During landing, Cadet Chaudhry's aircraft sustained damage, leaving only five Tiger-Moths operational.

Upon reaching Mianwali on the morning of 14 September 1947, the escorting Dakota crew informed them that sugar had been found in the leader's aircraft fuel tank, causing the engine failure. Upon inspection, three aircraft had filters clogged with sugar. Taking off for Risalpur under those conditions would have been disastrous. The aircraft flown by the late Masroor Hosain was the only one deemed serviceable and was flown to Risalpur, landing there in the afternoon.

On 21 March 1948, an air show in Lahore was displayed to help promote the RPAF amongst Pakistanis. Flight Lieutenants Abdul Naeem Aziz, Abdur Rahim Khan, and Flying Officers Masroor Hosain, and FS Hussain took part in the formation.

Flt Lt Masroor Hosain was among several Pakistani officers who were sent to the RAF Central Flying School in England. On 12 February 1949, he won the Clarkson Aerobatics Trophy. He was appointed Officer Commanding No. 14 Squadron PAF in November 1951.

Officers from the RPAF arrived at Point Cook on 13 June 1952, for a goodwill visit. During their stay, they played several hockey matches across Australia and toured all the capital cities. Group Captain A. Earle, the Acting Commanding Officer of RAAF Point Cook, welcomed Squadron Leader Masroor Hosain, the officer in charge of the visiting group.

In 1952, Squadron Leader Hosain was flying in formation with another Hawker Fury when a vulture suddenly crossed his path. Although the formation leader attempted to warn him, it was too late, and Hosain's Fury suffered severe damage that left it almost unflyable. Despite this, he successfully brought the aircraft back to RPAF Station Mauripur and landed safely.

On 3 June 1961, Masroor Hosain became the Commander of PAF Station Mauripur.

==== 1965 war ====
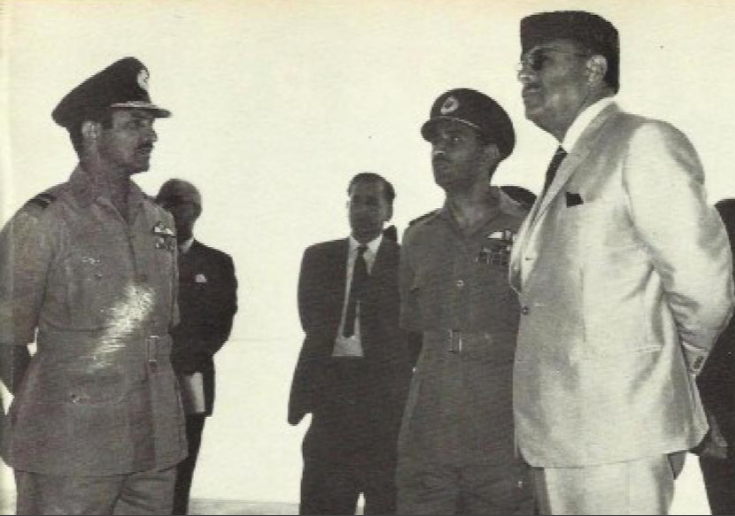
Air Commodore Hosain, Air Marshal Nur Khan and President Ayub Khan in Sargodha shortly after the end of the war, 1965

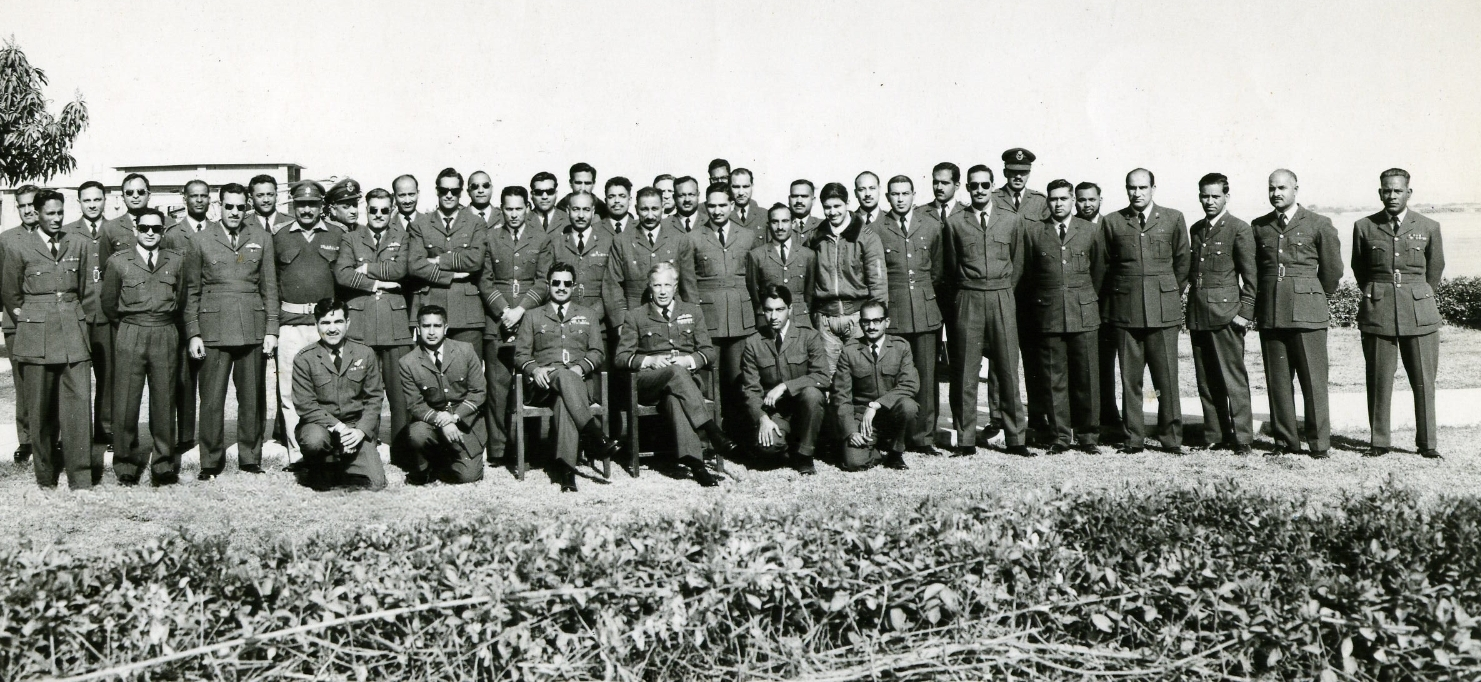
Seated: Air Commodores Masroor Hosain and W. J. M. Turowicz at PAF Station Mauripur during the latters farewell visit before retiring, 1966

Air Commodore Masroor Hosain played a crucial role in managing and directing PAF air operations during the Indo-Pakistani war of 1965. As Air Officer Commanding (AOC) Air Defence, he led the staff at the primary radar center located at PAF Station Sakesar in the central sector.

All PAF stations were put on high alert in anticipation of potential Indian Air Force attack, which led Pakistan to focus significantly on air defence. Approximately 40% of the PAF's fighter aircraft were initially reserved for this purpose. This effort was directed by Air Commodore Hosain, who was in charge of air defence at the Air Headquarters in Rawalpindi. The remaining Sabres were managed by the Assistant Chief of Air Staff (ACAS) Operations, Air Commodore Abdur Rahim Khan. Both officers were directly accountable to Air Marshal Nur Khan, who was in close contact with President Ayub Khan and General Headquarters.

The border line of responsibilities between ACAS Operations Abdur Rahim Khan and AOC Air Defence Hosain was somewhat ambiguous. However, this was addressed by Nur Khan's decision to relocate the PAF air defence team to the Ground-controlled interception (GCI) control center in Sakesar. This move allowed Air Cdre Masroor Hosain to utilise his expertise to directly evaluate the air situation using the Sakesar radar, facilitating prompt decisions on tactics and defensive measures.

On 10 September 1965, Flt Lts Syed Nazir Ahmed Jilani and Amanullah Khan engaged with three remaining Hunters, who were later joined by four Gnats. While Jilani maneuvered in a circle with one Hunter, Amanullah Khan stayed close until he was targeted by a Gnat, forcing him to evade. He narrowly avoided fire from a second Hunter. Eventually, Flt Lt Jilani managed to outmaneuver his opponent. He fired a barrage of armor-piercing and incendiary rounds at close range, causing the Hunter to plummet in flames and lose control.

The remaining IAF aircraft disengaged and disappeared as the engagement ended. Air Cdre Masroor Hosain, monitoring the fight from Sakesar, urged the PAF aircraft to pursue the IAF planes, but darkness fell rapidly, and the IAF aircraft vanished from sight. 'How did you get on?' Air Cdre Masroor asked over the radio to the returning pilots.

'I got a Hunter,' replied Sqn Ldr Sharbat Ali Changezi.

'I got a Hunter, too' added Flt Lt Syed Nazir Ahmed Jilani.

'I got saved,' remarked Flt Lt Amanullah Khan.

As a result of the Tashkent Declaration, the war ended. In meetings with American officials, Masroor Hosain was among several Pakistani officers who stated that Pakistan would fully implement withdrawal while Hosain hoped that India would also.

Air Chief Marshal Anwar Shamim in his book, "Cutting Edge PAF: A Former Air Chief's Reminiscences of a Developing Air Force", wrote:

"The names of Group Captain Masroor Hosain, Group Captain Saeedullah Khan and Group Captain Zafar Masud will forever be remembered in the history books as people who proved more than equal to the task.

==== Death ====
On 24 May 1967, Squadron Leader Sajad Haider strapped Air Commodore Masroor Hosain into his F-86 Sabre at PAF Station Samungli, where Hosain warned him, "You scared General Jehanzeb during mock attack exercises; be very mindful of the big vultures here." This warning turned out to be eerily prescient.

After landing at PAF Station Mauripur, Hosain switched to a waiting B-57 Canberra. While practicing a simulated attack, a large vulture struck his canopy, killing him instantly and causing the plane to crash in a field in Karachi. It was reported that he guided his crashing jet away from a residential area. His navigator, Flight Lieutenant Subhan successfully ejected. Two workers of the Karachi Development Authority were killed on the ground. Haider wrote that Hosain would have been the next Commander-in-Chief after Abdur Rahim Khan.

Commander-in-Chief, Air Marshal Nur Khan, wrote a letter to his widow:

"We have heard with the profoundest regret of the awful sorrow that has befallen you on the sad and sudden death of your husband in an unfortunate accident. In this tragic event you are not alone, for all personnel of our Service who have felt the impact of his personality and professional ability must bemoan the loss of so outstanding and honourable an officer."

Former Commander-in-Chief, Air Marshal Asghar Khan, wrote an obituary note published in The Pakistan Times dedicated to his junior colleague and close friend, Masroor Hosain:

"In the death of Air Commodore Masroor Hosain in a flying accident, the Pakistan Air Force has lost one of its finest officers. An exceptional pilot and an outstanding sportsman, he had throughout his career performed every assignment with distinction. He had a rare personal charm and engaging manner.

A person of many qualities he always set the highest standards of professional conduct. In a service which is rich in talent and tradition, he had stood out as a man that others might emulate. Always out-spoken and honest in his views he brought to the service a refreshing candour that raised the tone of any discussion in which he took part. So many were his qualities that if it can be said of any person, it can certainly be of him that he was indeed a "complete" officer. In a service hardened by such losses and steeled by experience of battle, the passing away of no one person is regarded as an irreparable loss, I have no doubt that the Pakistan Air Force will in time produce an officer who will acquire the distinction and ability that he displayed in the professional field.

I am however, certain that not many will display those human qualities that made him so rare a figure amongst his contemporaries. It is perhaps fitting that he should have died as he lived, in an environment to which he gave over 23 of his best years and in a service towards the development of which he made such a notable contribution.

He leaves behind a young and talented wife and two charming children. They will, I hope, bear this loss as well as he would have liked them to, for when the initial shock of this tragedy passes, they will treasure the memory of a husband and father whose loss many others today mourn with them."

== Awards and decorations ==
- RAF Central Flying School Clarkson Aerobatics Trophy, 1949
- Certificate of Supersonic Recognition of the Order of F-104 Starfighters, 1960
- Sitara-e-Pakistan, 1966

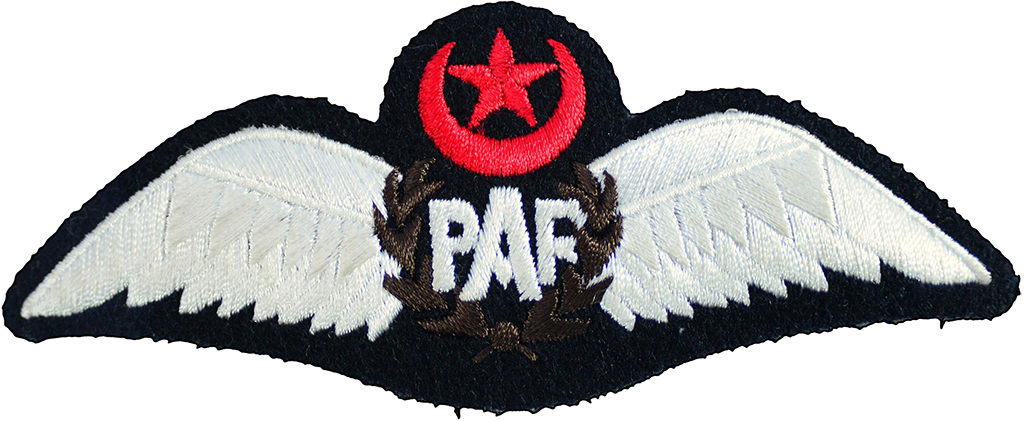
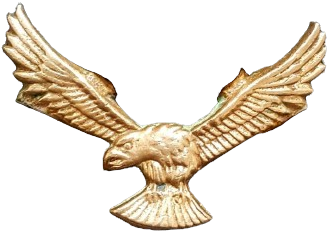

PAF GD(P) Badge RED (More than 3000 Flying Hours)
Golden Eagle Award (Pakistan) (Exceptional Fighter Pilot)
Sitara-e-Pakistan (Commander of the Order of Pakistan); 1965 War			India Service Medal 1939–1945
Pakistan Tamgha (Pakistan Medal) 1947	Tamgha-e-Qayam-e-Jamhuria (Republic Commemoration Medal) 1956	Sitara-e-Harb 1965 War (War Star 1965)	Tamgha-e-Jang 1965 War (War Medal 1965)
