= PAF Base Shahbaz =

Military airport in Jacobabad, Pakistan

PAF Base Shahbaz
- پی اے ایف بیس شہباز
- Jacobabad, Sindh in Pakistan
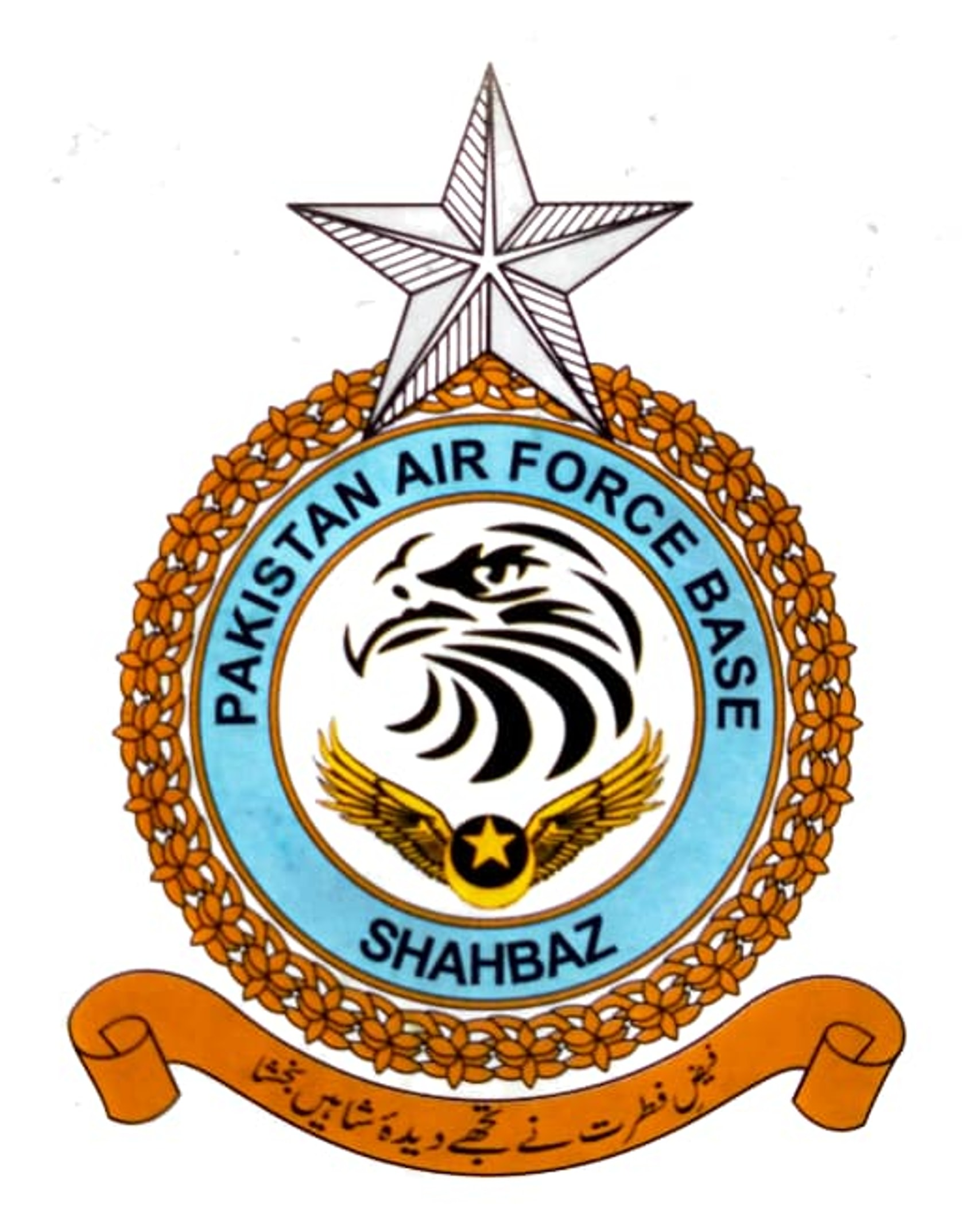

Site information
- Type: Military airbase
- Owner: Civil Aviation Authority (till 1967); Ministry of Defense (since 1967)
- Operator: Pakistan Air Force
- Controlled by: Southern Air Command

Location
- Shown within Sindh PAF Base Shahbaz (Pakistan)
- Coordinates: 28°17′4″N 68°27′1″E

Site history
- Built: 1942 & 2010
- Built by: British Raj
- In use: 1942 - present
- Battles/wars: World War II; 1999 Air Alert; Operation Enduring Freedom; 2025 India–Pakistan conflict

Garrison information
- Garrison: 39 Tactical Wing
- Occupants: 5 Squadron "Falcons"; 11 Squadron "Arrows"; 88 Squadron "Rams"

Airfield information
- Identifiers: IATA: JAG, ICAO: OPJA
- Elevation: 56 metres (184 ft) AMSL
Runways
Direction	Length and surface
15L/33R	3,060 metres (10,039 ft) Asphalt

Pakistan Air Force Base Shahbaz (Urdu: پاک فضائیہ شہباز ایئربیس (IATA: JAG, ICAO: OPJA), lit. Shahbaz Airbase) is a Pakistan Air Force (PAF) base and airport, which the PAF and the Pakistan Civil Aviation Authority (CAA) operate jointly. It is located in the city of Jacobabad in the northern part of the Sindh province. The base is named after the Shahbaz, the fabled bird from Persian mythology.

== History ==
In the wake of World War II, the British Raj built an airfield at the old city of Jacobabad in 1942 for use by the Royal Air Force. After Pakistan's independence in 1947, the airfield was inherited by the Civil Aviation Department who in 1967, granted the PAF operational and administrative control of the airfield. Jacobabad airfield resultantly became a Forward operating base and functioned as a satellite station of PAF Base Masroor and later PAF Base Samungli.

The airfield was activated amid the Kargil War in 1999 during which General Dynamics F-16 Fighting Falcons of the 11 Squadron "Arrows" were deployed there for Air alert duties. It was again activated after the United States invasion of Afghanistan in 2001, in which the airbase was heavily used by NATO for Operation Enduring Freedom. It remained the hub of logistic support operations for NATO forces in Afghanistan till November 2004. From 2005 and 2009, the airbase hosted many national and multi-nation military exercises including the first of "Exercise Falcon Talon" series along with Exercise High Mark in 2005 and 2010.

In 2007, the Air Headquarters chose Jacobabad airfield to host one of PAF's oldest and elite squadron; the No. 5 Squadron PAF, which was due to receive advanced F-16C/D Fighting Falcons in June 2010. Since Jacobabad required major infrastructure upgrades in order to host the new squadron and her aircraft, the PAF launched Project Shahbaz under which extensive construction and development of facilities were done at the airfield. Subsequently, Jacobabad airfield was transformed into a Main operating base and renamed PAF Base Shahbaz. The first 5 F-16s landed at the base on 26 June 2010 followed by another batch on 13 December 2010. No. 11 Squadron was also permanently deployed there after receiving it's F-16A/B MLUs which was followed by the establishment of the 88 Search and Rescue Squadron with Leonardo AW-139s in June 2017. Currently, Lockheed Martin contract personnel are present here.

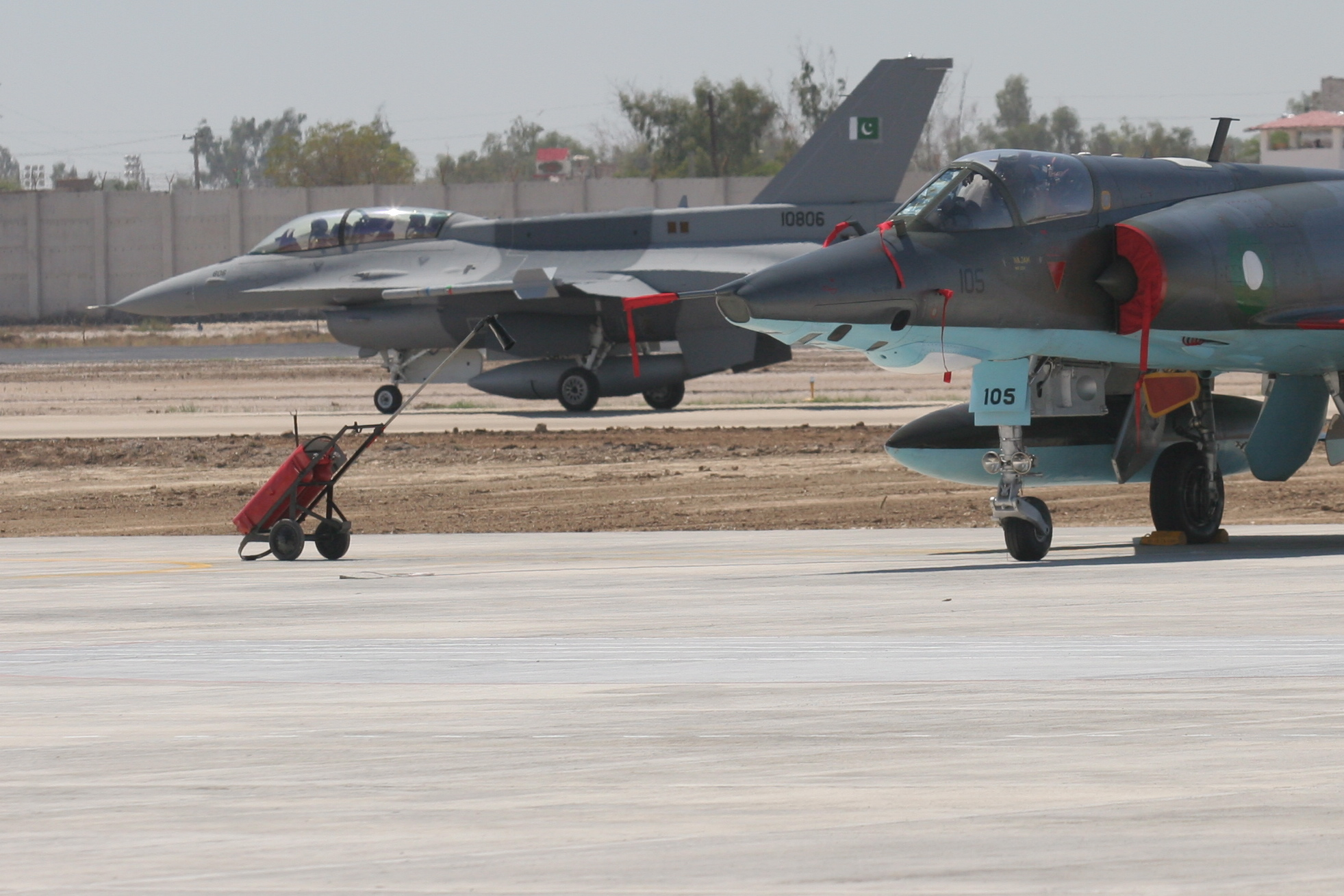
F-16C Block 52+ taxis on the runway as the older Dassault Mirage of 5 Squadron await to be replaced during the re-equipment ceremony at PAF Base Shahbaz

Many facilities have also been constructed for the airbase's community over the years which included a Sports Complex, Churches for Christian community, water filteration plants etc.

=== 2010 and 2012 Floods ===
Operational activities of the base were disrupted during heavy monsoon rainfalls and floods in 2010 with ongoing construction projects being halted. Despite the challenging situation and personal hardships, the airmen of the Shahbaz airbase remained actively involved in relief operations at neighboring districts.

In 2012, runway of the base got flooded and suspended flying operations till the water was pumped out again.

=== 2025 India–Pakistan conflict ===
The base came under attack during the 2025 India–Pakistan conflict. Satellite imagery showed severe damage to buildings used as aircraft hangars. Shahbaz air base, which is used exclusively by the military, satellite imagery showed another large hole in a hangar, over 100 feet (30 m) wide, and damage to the air traffic control tower. Chief Minister of Sindh, Murad Ali Shah, said that nine Pakistan Air Force personnel were injured at the Jacobabad airbase during the Indian strikes.

Satellite imagery from 4 June showed partial roof coverings and the absence of debris that had been visible in earlier images taken on 11 May. The images, obtained via Maxar Technologies, indicated repair work.

== Units ==
- 39 Tactical Wing:
  - 5 Squadron "Falcons" – Operating F-16C/D Vipers
  - 11 Squadron "Arrows" – Operating F-16A/B MLU
  - 88 Squadron "Rams" – Operating Leonardo AW139s
