= No. 88 Squadron PAF =

No. 88 Combat Support Squadron & Advanced Helo Training School
- Active: Since June 2010 (15 years, 7 months)
- Country: Pakistan
- Allegiance: Pakistan Armed Forces
- Branch: Pakistan Air Force
- Type: Squadron
- Role: Search and Rescue
- Airbase: PAF Base Shahbaz
- Motto: Learnt supremacy in flying from angles
- Mascot: A Ram
- Engagements: Rescue Operations; 2010 Pakistan floods; 2012 Pakistan floods; Operation Swift Retort

Aircraft flown
- Helicopter: AW-139; Mi-171

88 Combat Support Squadron & Advanced Helo Training School nicknamed Rams is a helicopter squadron of the Pakistan Air Force consisting of AW-139 and Mi-171 helicopters. The squadron is based at Shahbaz airbase in Jacobabad and undertakes Operational conversion on the AW-139 along with providing SAR coverage to the airbase.

== History ==
The No. 88 Squadron was originally a Search & Rescue (SAR) squadron. The squadron was raised at its home airbase at PAF Base Shahbaz in June 2010 as 88 Search and Rescue (SAR) Squadron with Mi-171s in its inventory. Its main mission was to provide SAR services to the airbase's training areas while also undertaking secondary tasks of MEDEVAC, Disaster relief, Tactical Operations, Air Transport operations and VIP transport.

In August 2013, the Mi-171s of the squadron received Night Vision upgrades which included modification of Star SAFIRE-III FLIR. It enabled the squadron to carry out Night Rescue missions. In June 2017, the squadron became the PAF's first to unit to receive AW-139 helicopters.

The squadron underwent a significant change when it adopted the Leonardo AW139, a cutting-edge utility helicopter. This transition occurred on March 3, 2018 when the squadron was rebranded as the No.88 Combat Support Squadron and Advanced Helicopter Training School which added the OCU role to the squadron undertaking the responsibility of training PAF pilots and technicians on the new system.

=== Operational history ===
The squadron's Mi-171s flew round the clock SAR and relief sorties during the 2010 and 2012 Floods. In 2013, the squadron flew over 125 sorties accumulating 135 flying hours distributing 500 tons of relief supplies to flood affected areas. In 2017, the squadron provided rescue services during the Bahawalpur oil tanker disaster after a PAF C-130 had blocked the nearest airfield. The squadron also flew deep cross country missions during Operation Swift Retort to support the deployment of other squadrons to their wartime locations

== See also ==
- List of Pakistan Air Force squadrons
