= Paybills =

- پے بلز
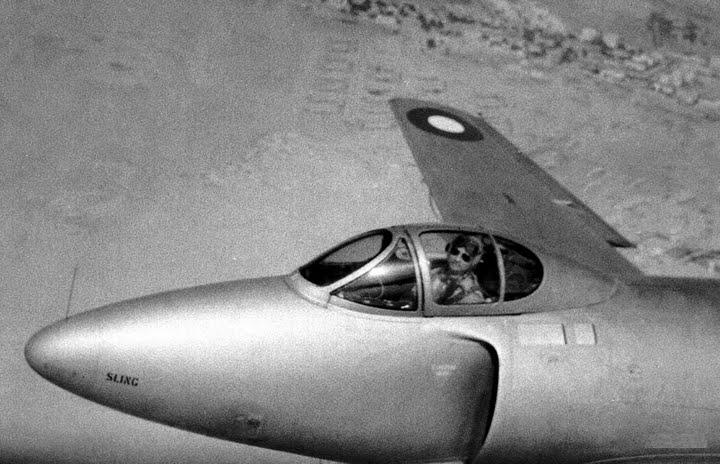
- The leader of Paybills FS Hussain in the cockpit of an Attacker
- Active: 1952
- Disbanded: ~1958
- Country: Pakistan
- Allegiance: Pakistan Armed Forces
- Branch: Pakistan Air Force
- Type: Flight
- Role: Aerobatic display team
- Part of: No. 11 Squadron Arrows
- Garrison/HQ: RPAF Base Drigh Road
- Nickname(s): Paybills

Commanders
- Notable commanders: Squadron Leader F.S Hussain

Aircraft flown
- Fighter: Supermarine Attacker Type 538

The Paybills was a Royal Pakistan Air Force (RPAF) aerobatic team that flew the Supermarine Attacker FB.50 jet aircraft in the early 1950s. The unit was Pakistan's first jet powered aerobatic team and belonged to the RPAF's first operational jet fighter squadron, No. 11 Squadron Arrows.

The team was formed in 1952 with 5 Supermarine Attacker FB.50 by then Squadron Leader F.S Hussain who was a flight commander with the No. 11 Squadron. The team also included RPAF's renowned Jamal A. Khan and Zafar Masud. The name Paybills was given to the team since it was the callsign of the No. 11 Squadron at the time. While not much is known about its final years, the Attacker FB.50 jets were retired from the air force in 1958.

Paybills Team
Rank	Name	Reference(s)
Squadron Leader	FS Hussain	
Flight Lieutenant	Zafar Masud	
Flight Lieutenant	Pete Malik	
Flying Officer	A U Ahmed	
Flying Officer	Jamal A. Khan	

== See also ==
- History of the Pakistan Air Force
- List of air display teams
