= No. 5 Squadron PAF =

No. 5 Squadron Falcons
- Active: 15 August 1947 — Present
- Country: Pakistan
- Allegiance: Pakistan Armed Forces
- Branch: Pakistan Air Force
- Type: Fighter squadron
- Role: Multi-role
- Part of: Southern Air Command
- Airbase: PAF Base Shahbaz
- Motto(s): The blue sky-vast, boundless-is mine
- Mascot(s): A falcon in flight carrying a weapon.
- Aircraft: F-16 Fighting Falcon; F-16C/D Block 52+
- Engagements: 1947 Indo-Pakistani War; 1965 Indo-Pak War; 1971 Indo-Pak War

Commanders
- Notable commanders: Hakimullah Khan Durrani; Sarfaraz Ahmed Rafiqui; Masroor Hosain; FS Hussain

Insignia
- Patch (Pilots)

- Patch (Non-flying personnel)

Aircraft flown
- Fighter: 1. Hawker Tempest II; 2. Hawker Sea Fury; 3. F-86 Sabre; 4. F-104 Starfighter; 5. Dassault Mirage III; 6. F-16C/D Block 52+ (2010–Present)
- Reconnaissance: Dassault Mirage III RP (1967–2010)

No. 5 Squadron, named the Falcons, is a Pakistan Air Force fighter squadron, the second oldest fighter squadron since the PAF's creation in 1947.

== History ==
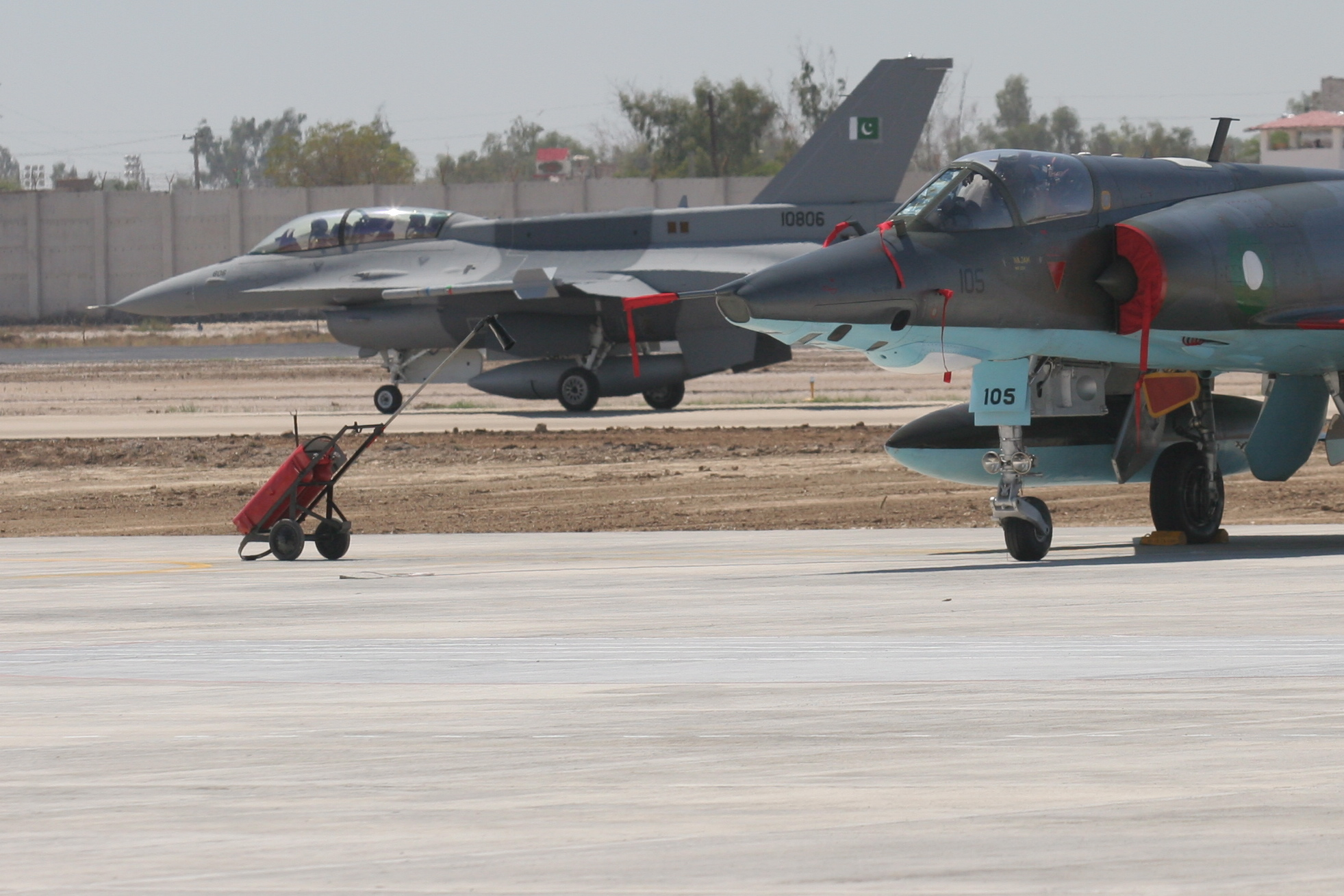
A new F-16D Block 52+ taxies behind one of the Mirages it is replacing during the re-equipment ceremony.

The squadron was established as part of the Royal Pakistan Air Force on 15 August 1947, equipped with eight Hawker Tempest II fighters and commanded by Squadron Leader Zaheer Ahmad. The unit was based at Miranshah and was suffering from inadequate numbers of technical staff. Most of the squadron's personnel were inherited from the Royal Indian Air Force No. 1 Squadron. In December 1947 the squadron provided cover to the Pakistan Army units pulling out from Razmak during 'Operation Curzon.'

In the early 1950s the unit was converted to fly the Hawker Sea Fury.

The squadron's F-86 Sabres were replaced in 1967 with the Dassault Mirage IIIE and its role changed to tactical attack. The unit was made fully operational and, during the 1971 Indo-Pak War, over 200 missions were flown in day and night.

The squadron's reconnaissance role is performed year-round along the entire eastern border with Mirage III/5 reconnaissance variants and reconnaissance pods supported by other PAF aircraft and ground-based radars. These duties require the squadron to be split up and deployed at different locations throughout the year. Reconnaissance duties are in addition to monthly Air Defence Alert (ADA) and training.

In 2010 the squadron was re-equipped with the F-16C/D Block 52+, the old Mirage III/5 being transferred to other units. As well as air-to-air and air-to-ground armaments such as the AIM-120 AMRAAM, the new F-16s are also equipped with new Goodrich DB-110 reconnaissance pods. These have seen service in the skies over North West Pakistan against the insurgency there, providing high resolution infra-red imagery and maps to the Pakistani forces.

No. 5 Squadron Falcons
Role	Operational	Aircraft	Notes
	1947~1950s	Hawker Tempest II	
	~1950s—56	Hawker Sea Fury	
	~1956–69	F-104 Starfighter	
	----—1967	F-86 Sabre	
Tactical attack and reconnaissance	1967–2010	Dassault Mirage III	Operated four variants of the Mirage III/5 during the 1990s. Trans-frontier reconnaissance sorties with reconnaissance pods flown throughout the year in peace-time, supported by other equipment such as electronic warfare aircraft of No. 24 Blinders squadron.
Multi-role	2010	F-16 Fighting Falcon; F-16C/D Block 52+	

=== Awards ===
- The Pakistani Inter-Squadron Armament Trophy 1952
- The Pakistani Inter-Squadron Maintenance Efficiency Trophy (1991, 1992, 1995)
- The Pakistani Inter-Squadron Armament Competition (ISAC) 1996 – fourth place overall.

== Gallery ==
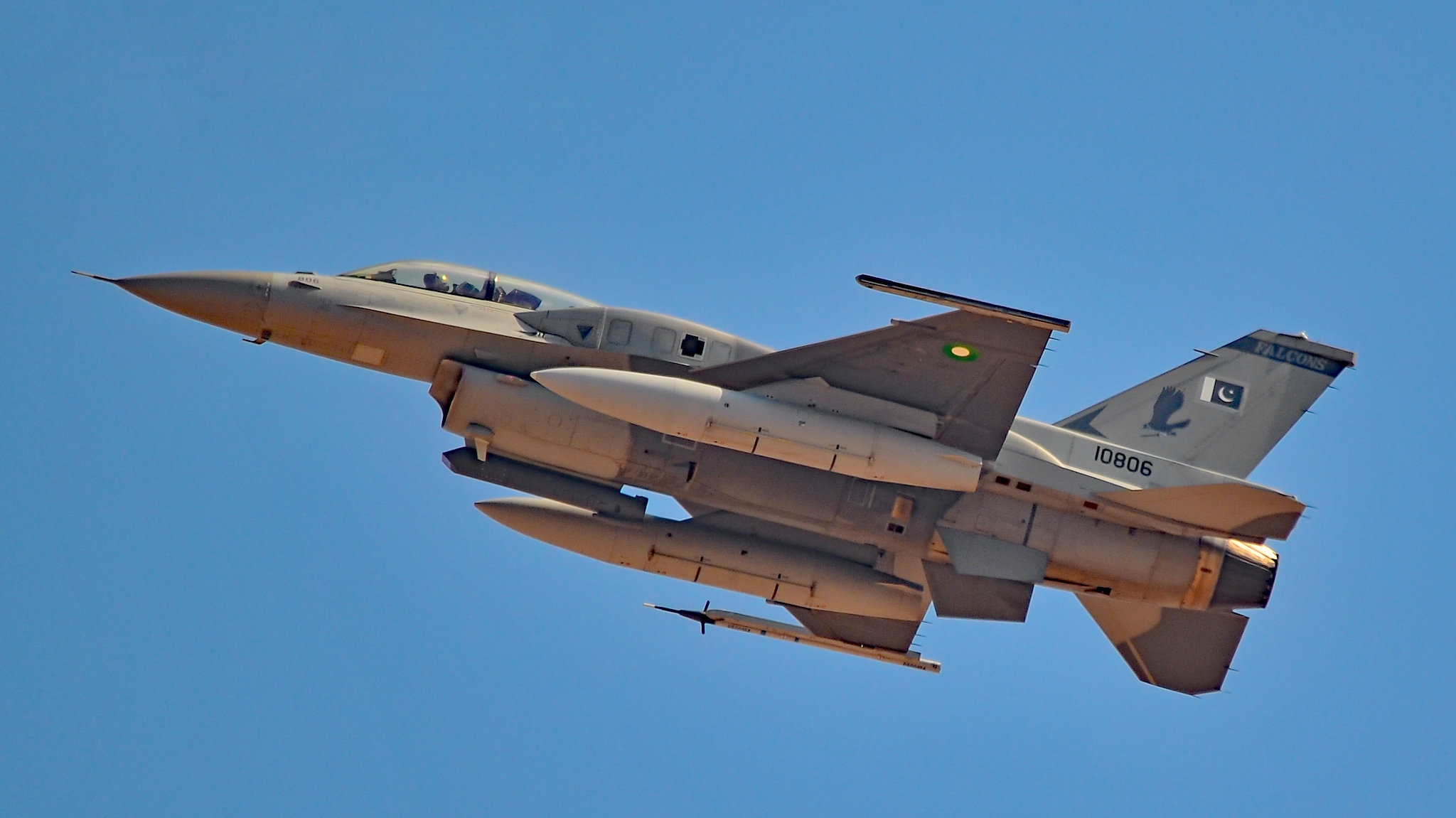
A Pakistani F-16 Block-52 from the No. 5 Squadron

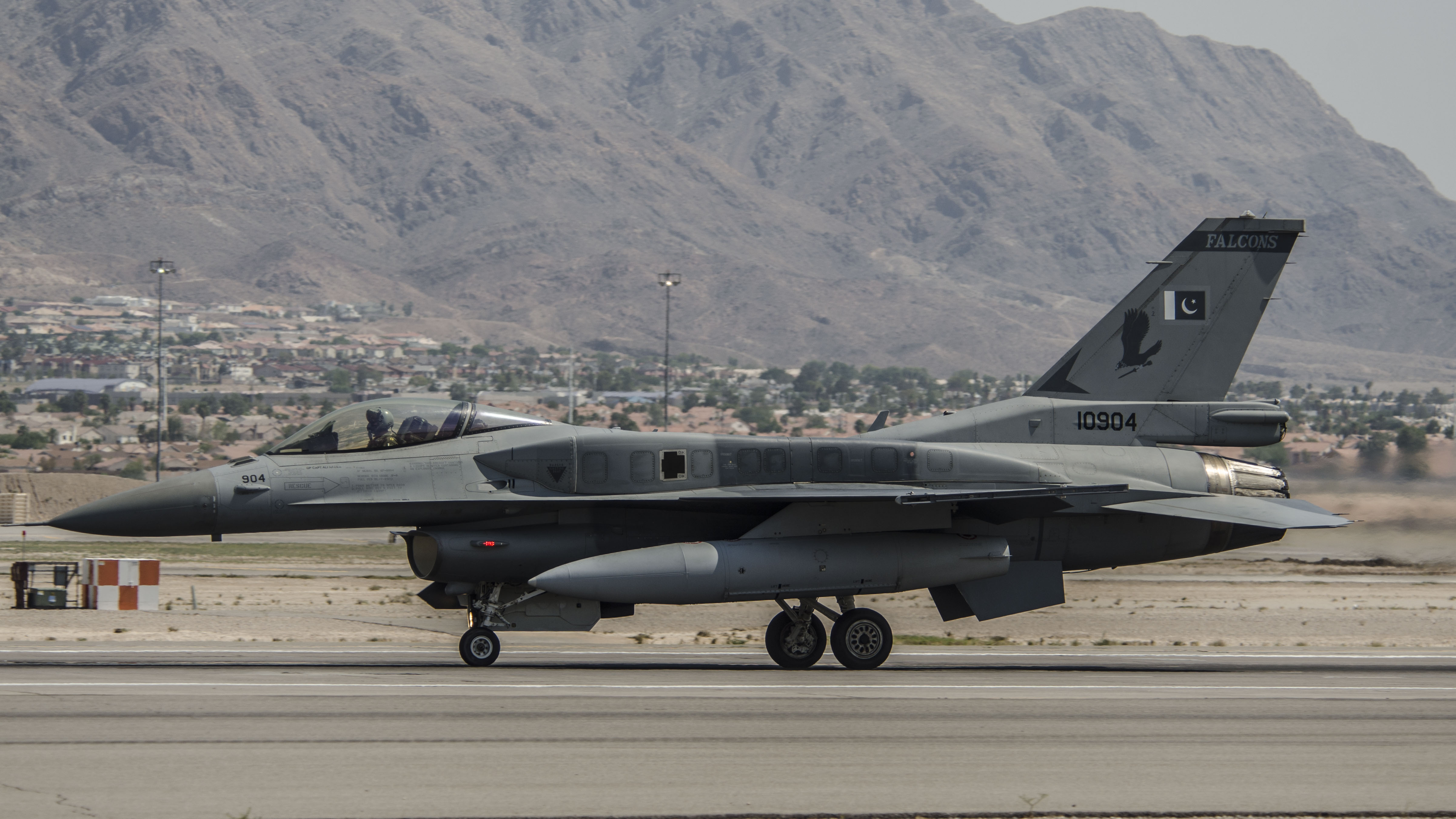
A Pakistani F-16 Block-52 from the No. 5 Squadron

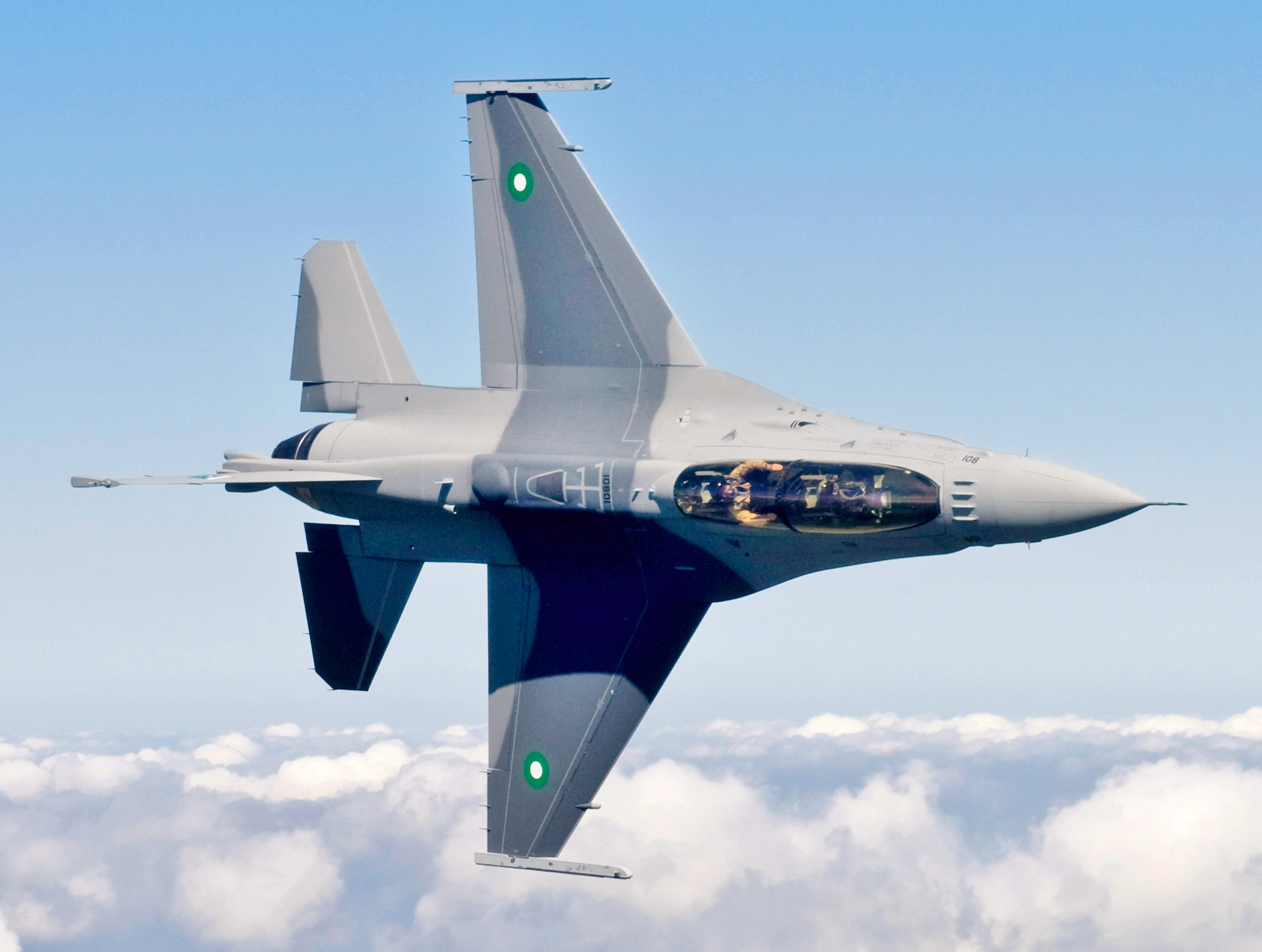
A Pakistani F-16 Block-52 from the No. 5 Squadron

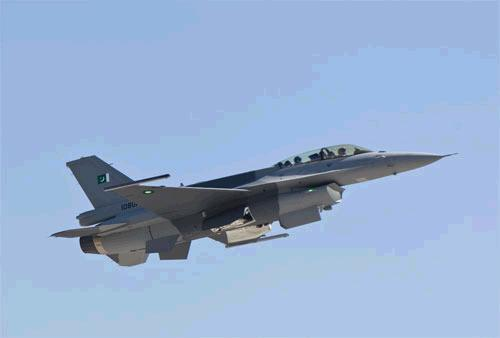
A Pakistani F-16 Block-52 from the No. 5 Squadron

== See also ==
- List of Pakistan Air Force squadrons
- No. 9 Squadron (Pakistan Air Force)
