= Muniruddin Ahmed (fighter pilot) =

Pakistani Pilot (1927-1965)

Squadron Leader Muniruddin Ahmed SJ
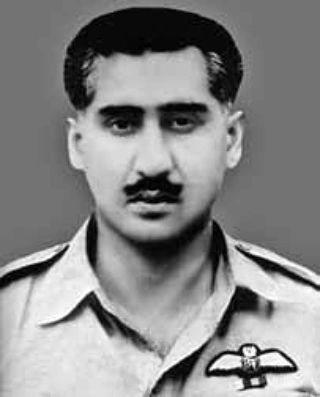
- Squadron Leader Muniruddin Ahmed
- Alma mater: Pakistan Air Force Academy
- Military career
- Allegiance: Pakistan
- Branch: Pakistan Air Force
- Service years: 1955 — 1965
- Rank: Squadron Leader
- Service number: PAK/5030
- Unit: No. 14 Squadron PAF
- Commands: No. 19 Squadron PAF; No. 11 Squadron PAF; No. 5 Squadron PAF
- Conflicts: Indo-Pakistani War of 1965 †
- Awards: Sitara-e-Jurat (Star of Courage) Award

Squadron Leader Muniruddin Ahmed SJ (27 September 1927 – 11 September 1965) was a Pakistani fighter pilot and a war hero in the Pakistan Air Force (PAF).

He was posthumously awarded the Sitara-e-Jurat for his gallantry during the Indo-Pakistani War of 1965, particularly for leading combat missions and he was hit during the successful strike on the Amritsar radar station.

== Early life ==
Muniruddin was born at Gurdaspur, India on 27 September 1927 in an Ahmadiyya family. His father, Dr Khalifa Rashiduddinra was a prominent Ahmadiyaa leader. He completed his education from PAF College Risalpur and later joined the Pakistan Air Force.

== Military career ==
Munir was commissioned in the 26 GD(P) on 22 Dec 1955 in No. 14 Squadron PAF. After getting commissioned, he served at various fighter squadrons of PAF, which includes the No. 19 Squadron PAF, No. 11 Squadron PAF and No. 5 Squadron PAF. Within a short time, Munir became an exceptional fighter pilot.
During the Indo-Pakistani War of 1965, Munir was assigned at PAF Base Sargodha, one of the major operational bases of Pakistan. Munir had actively taken part in numerous operations in Northern Punjab. On 10 September, he had shot down an IAF Gnat.

On 11 September 1965, Munir had voluntarily joined an operation to destroy a radar station at Amritsar. Under the leadership of the then, Wing Commander Anwar Shamim, Munir had taken off along with the then Flight Lieutenant Cecil Chaudhry and Flight Lieutenant Imtiaz Ahmed Bhatti. Despite being under heavy fire, he had completed his mission. While doing so, he was hit by an anti aircraft fire. Shamim tried to find his body and aircraft, but none of them were found. He was later declared missing in action. For his gallantry actions, the Government of Pakistan awarded him with Sitara-e-Jurat, third highest gallantry award.

== Legacy ==
A house at PAF College Sargodha, one of the educational institutions of Pakistan Air Force has been named after him.

== Sitara-e-Jurat citation ==
Munir's Sitara-e-Jurat citation read as follows :

CITATION

Squadron Leader Munir-ud-Din Ahmed

14 SQUADRON PAK/5030

During the war, a high-powered heavily defended radar station near Amritsar was attacked repeatedly by the PAF fighters. In all these missions, Squadron Leader Munir unhesitatingly volunteered to fly and without regard for his personal safety exposed himself to intense ack ack fire for long periods in attempts to locate and destroy the target. In the final successful attack on September 11, he made the supreme sacrifice when his aircraft was fatally hit. Before his last sortie, Munir flew eight combat missions and shot down an IAF Gnat on September 10. For displaying courage and determination in the face of heavy odds and beyond the call of duty, Squadron Leader Munir-ud-Din Ahmed is awarded Sitara-i-Jurat.

== Awards and decorations ==
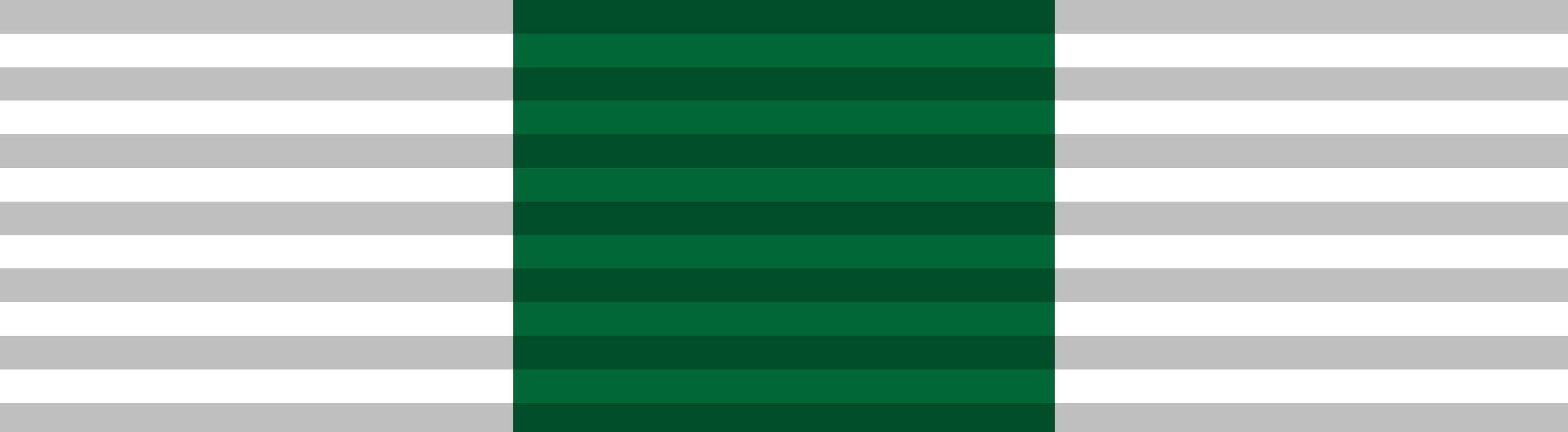

Sitara-e-Jurat (Star of Courage) 1965 War Posthumous
Tamgha-e-Diffa (General Service Medal) 1965 War Clasp Posthumous	Sitara-e-Harb 1965 War (War Star 1965) Posthumous	Tamgha-e-Jang 1965 War (War Medal 1965) Posthumous	Tamgha-e-Jamhuria (Republic Commemoration Medal) 1956
