= Nizampur, Amritsar =

Nizampur
- Interactive map of Nizampur

Languages
  - Official: Punjabi, Hindi, Urdu
- Time zone: UTC+5:30 (IST)
- Vehicle registration: PB 02
- Literacy: 60%
- Lok Sabha constituency: Jandiala
- Climate: Continental with four seasons (Köppen 35 °C (95 °F)
- Avg. winter temperature: 14 °C (57 °F)

Nizampur is a village in Amritsar district, Punjab, India.

== History ==
Nizampur village is a very old village and the farmers of this village migrated to Lyallpur, currently known as Faisalabad area of Pakistan around the year 1900 when agriculture land was developed in this area with the help of irrigation canals newly built by Britishers. These farmers settled into 4-5 villages one of which was Nizampur Deva Singh Wala, now in Pakistan, district Sheikhupur, during the colonization of Lower Chenab Bar in the early years of 19th century. The residents of this village made up a major portion of the Sikh jatha which went to liberate Nankana Sahib Gurudwara and most of them were martyred in liberating this Gurudwara. The head of this jatha Sh. Tehal Singh belonged to Nizampur. This village has had a primary school even before 1947 and boasted of a cooperative credit society, brick lined bazars and streets even before partition. Majority of the people of this village belong to Kamboj community and are well known for growing vegetables. The residents are quite peace-loving and one has never heard of earned disputes among the residents. The village got a big splash across the media in the 1950s when four armed robbers armed to the teeth with rifles and pistols were over-powered by the villagers with lathis, etc. Due to this act of bravery some of the residents got bravery awards. These details are incorporated by S. Jagir Singh rtd. Chief engineer who is now settled in Chandigarh.

== Literacy ==
Literacy rate of the village is about 60%. There is an elementary school in the village where small children study. For higher education students have to go to DAV College, Khalsa College or GNDU University, Amritsar. Lot of boys and girls these days go to Amritsar and other cities to gain higher education from colleges like Chandigarh engineering college etc.

== Fairs and festivals ==
Every year in June people celebrate a fair at a holy place in the village called "Baba Sher Singh". The fair is organized with sports like Kabaddi and Wrestling. This fair is on 26 July ( 10th of Haar according to desi calendar). History of this place is that there used to live a priest called Sher Singh. One night some thieves came to steal his cow. But whenever they cross the border of that place they become blind and when they move few steps behind again they gain their visibility. They repeated it several times but same thing happened again and again. From that day the priest gained popularity and thus people arrange the fair to memorize Baba Sher Singh. There is another religious historical place in the village called " Baba Dhora Wala". The fair on this place is on 28 July (12th of Haar according to desi Calendar).

== Sport ==
Village has a registered sports club called "Shaheed Bhagat Singh Sports and Youth Club". The village boys play a number of games which are as follows:

a)Kabaddi: Kabaddi is believed to have originated from the tribe of Kadirs who thought of themselves to be great champions of sport. In 1938 it was introduced in Olympic Games. Kabaddi is a very enthusiastic game which requires a lot of stamina and reflexes.

b)Kho Kho: This game is played by both boys and girls. It is very popular and interesting game.

c)Football: Village boys can be often seen playing football in the village ground.

d)Cricket: Cricket has gained importance and you can see boys playing cricket in ground and on streets as well.

e)Gulli Danda:This is a very rare game played in rural towns and villages of India.

f)Bandar Killa: This game is played by four or more children. Firs the children do a pugun pugayee(a kind of toss without a coin). The one who loses the pugun pugayee becomes bandar. A circle is drawn on the ground and every player places his chappals(shoes) in the circle. Then the bandar stands in the circle and all the other players have to steal the chappals from the circle without being caught. If the bandar touches you while you are stealing then you have to be the Bandar. If the Bander can't get hold of anyone & everyone gets away with their pair of chapliyaan, then he is regarded as a true Bander (loser).

g)Pithu Garam: It is an outdoor game. There are two teams each team having equal members. About 5-7 flat stones (theekrian) are piled up. This pile is called Pithu. A member from one team has to hit the pithu from a distance of about 4 meters with a ball and members of the other team get scattered in the field. Each player gets three turns to hit the pitthu and break it. As soon as the player hits and breaks the pitthu, the actual game begins. This is when one team tries to rebuild the pitthu and 2nd team stops them from doing so, by hitting them with the ball.

The player gets out if the ball touches him/her, but if he/she succeeds in making the pitthu first, then that team gets a point. In this way the game continues till all the children have got their turns to hit the pitthu. The team that makes more pitthus is the winner

== Population ==
Nizampurah Local Language is Punjabi. Nizampura Village Total population is 2990 and number of houses are 574. Female Population is 47.8%. Village literacy rate is 63.0% and the Female Literacy rate is 28.5%.
