= Nizampur, Panipat =

Village in Haryana, India

Nizampur is a village in Panipat district of Haryana, India. It is located six kilometers north of district headquarter Panipat and 169 kilometers from state capital Chandigarh. It is surrounded by Village Chandoli from East, by HUDA sector 40 from west, by Eldeco estate from North and Ansal and HUDA Sector 18 from south.
