= PAF Base Masroor =

Military airport in Pakistan

PAF Base Masroor
- Karachi, Sindh in Pakistan
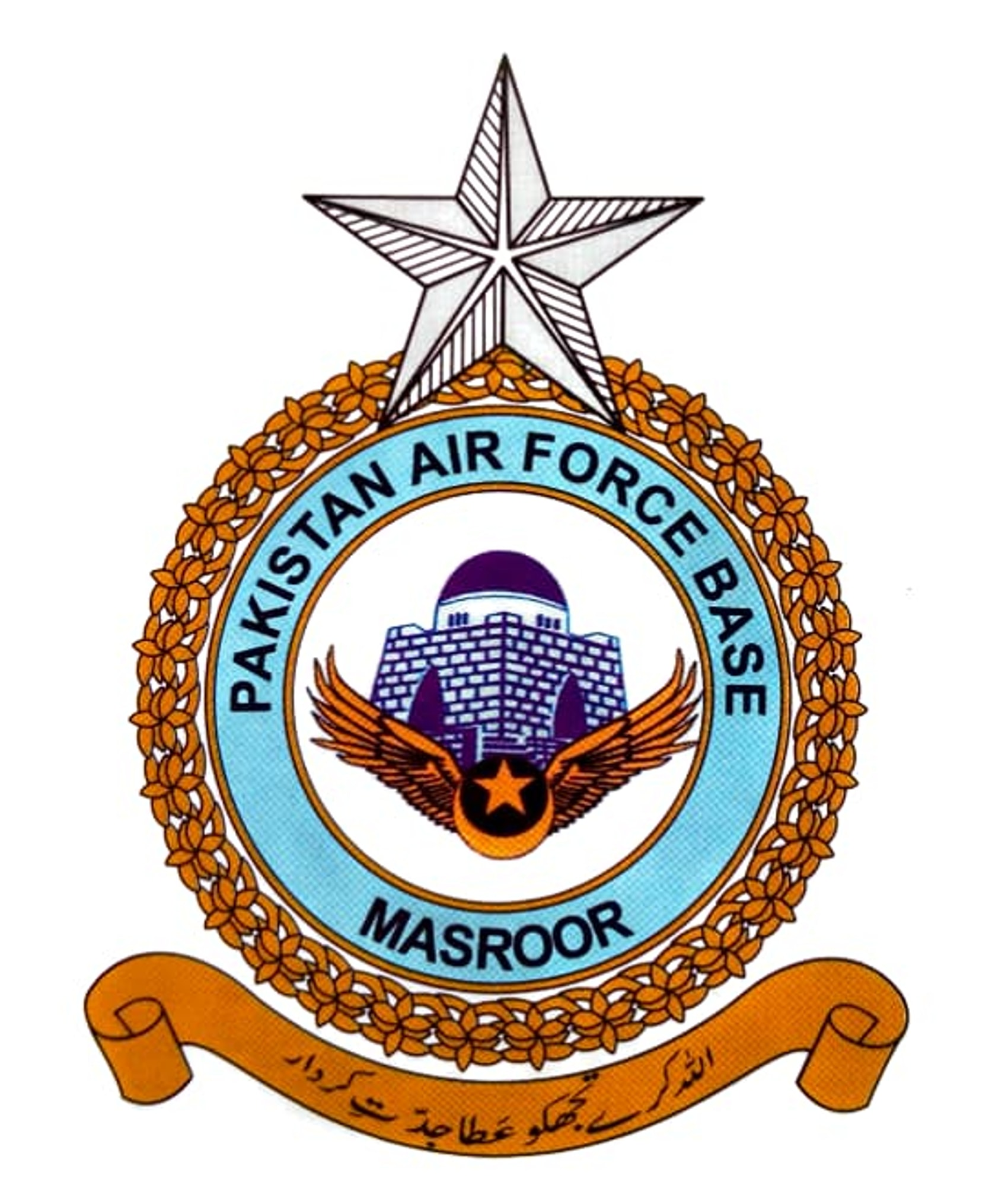

Site information
- Type: Military airbase
- Owner: Ministry of Defense
- Operator: Pakistan Air Force
- Controlled by: Southern Air Command
- Other site facilities: Tactical Air Support School
- Website: Pakistan Air Force

Location
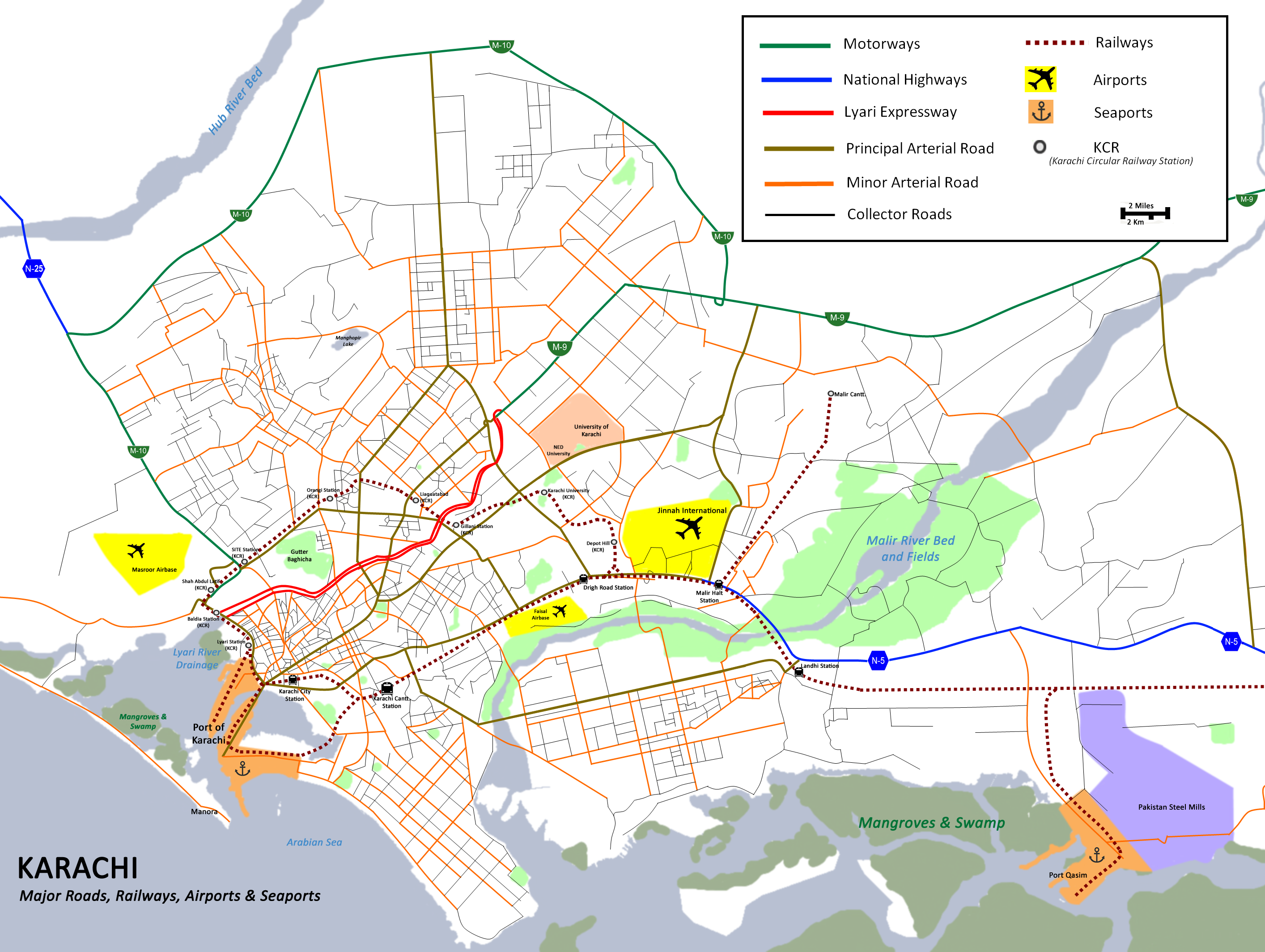
- Shown within Karachi PAF Base Masroor (Pakistan) PAF Base Masroor (Asia)
- Coordinates: 24°53′37″N 66°56′20″E

Site history
- Built: 1940
- In use: 1940 - present
- Battles/wars: World War II

Garrison information
- Current commander: Air Commodore Omair Najmi
- Occupants: No. 2 Squadron PAF; No. 8 Squadron PAF; No. 84 Squadron PAF

Airfield information
- Identifiers: IATA: MSR, ICAO: OPMR
- Elevation: 11 metres (36 ft) AMSL
Runways
Direction	Length and surface
04/22	Asphalt
09/27	Concrete

Pakistan Air Force Base Masroor or more simply PAF Base Masroor (ICAO: OPMR) is the largest airbase operated by the Pakistan Air Force. It is located in the Mauripur area of Karachi, in the Sindh province.

The base was originally known as RIAF Base Mauripur (1940-47), RPAF Station Mauripur (1947-56), and after 23 March 1956, as PAF Station Mauripur. It is now named after the pilot Masroor Hosain.

PAF Base Faisal and PAF Base Bholari are the other Pakistan Air Force bases in Karachi.

== History ==
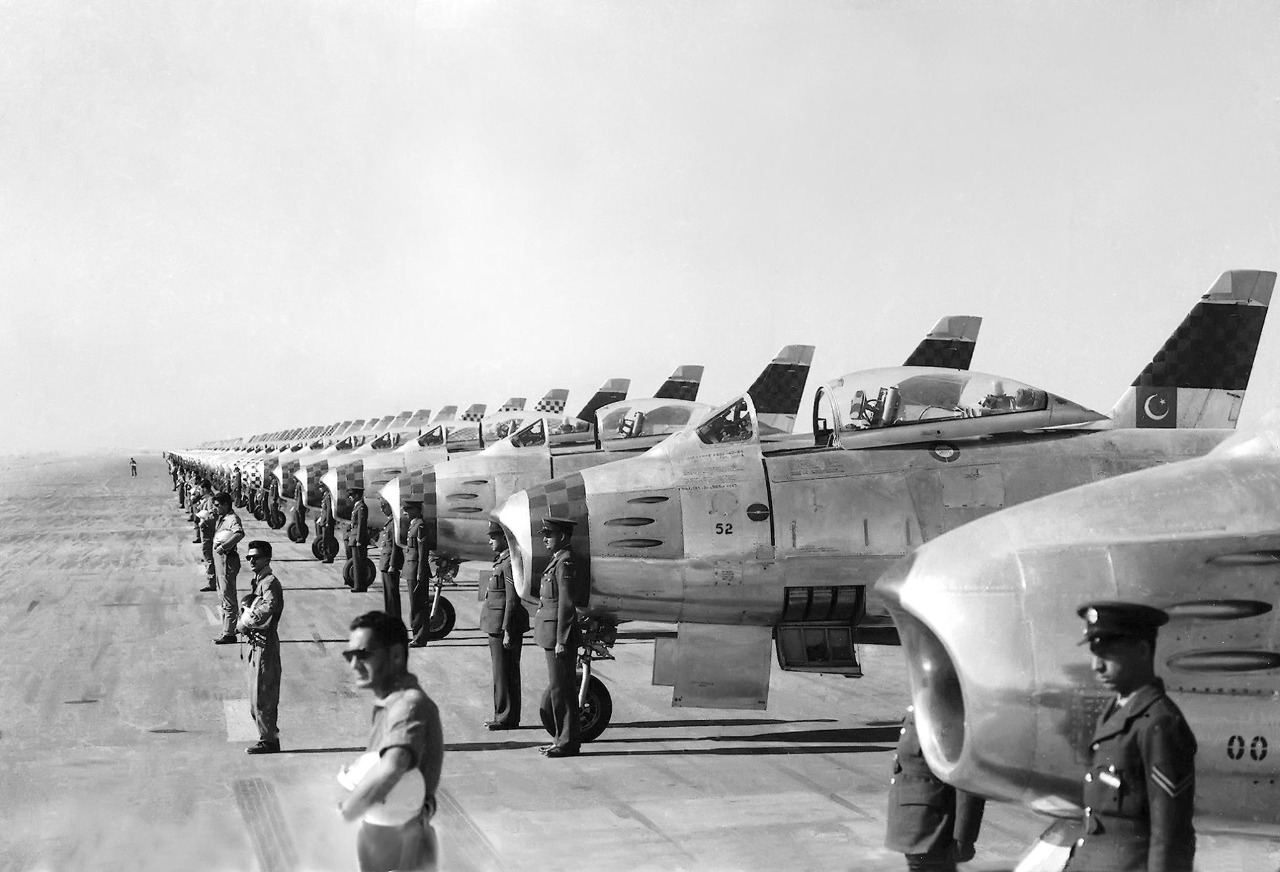
PAF F-86 Sabres lined up during a ceremony at Masrur

The airbase at Mauripur was established by the RIAF during World War II in 1942 as a transit airfield allowing RAF Drigh Road to concentrate on maintenance. Huge numbers of aircraft staged through Mauripur during and after the end of World War II. British units continued to use the airfield after the creation of Pakistan in 1947, finally leaving in 1956. The RAF airfields at Gan and Masirah took over RAF Far East Air Force staging duties from Mauripur and Habbaniya (which became unavailable from 14 July 1958 after the revolution in Iraq).

=== Historic units and aircraft ===
Unit	Dates	Aircraft	Variant	Notes
No. 5 Squadron RAF	1947	Hawker Tempest	F.2	Single-engined (piston) fighter
No. 10 Squadron RAF	1946-1947	Douglas Dakota		Twin-engined piston transport
No. 20 Squadron RAF	1947	Hawker Tempest	F.2	
No. 31 Squadron RAF	1946 and 1947	Douglas Dakota		Was 77 Sqn
No. 62 Squadron RAF	1947	Douglas Dakota		
No. 77 Squadron RAF	1945-1946	Douglas Dakota		Renumbered 31 Sqn
No. 117 Squadron RAF	1943	Douglas Dakota		
No. 267 Squadron RAF	1945-1946	Douglas Dakota		Detachments from Mingaladon
No. 298 Squadron RAF	1946	Handley Page Halifax	A.7	Four-engined piston heavy bomber transport conversion

=== Post-partition era ===
After the Partition of British India, the base became RPAF Station Mauripur.

On 24 May 1968, PAF Station Mauripur was renamed PAF Station Masroor in honor of base commander Air Commodore Masroor Hosain.

On 1 July 1970, Pakistan Air Force stations were renamed to bases.

During 1979 the base was home to 7 Squadron with the Martin B-57B Canberra.

== Features ==
Masroor airbase has the distinction of not only being the largest base, area wise, in Pakistan but also in Asia. Before Karachi Airport, this airport had been used for domestic flights and also by Quaid-e-Azam Muhammad Ali Jinnah, the founder of Pakistan. It is of immense strategic importance considering it has been entrusted upon the task of defending the coastal and Southern region of Pakistan. It houses the 32 Tactical Attack (TA) Wing which comprises six separate squadrons. squadrons include No 2 MR squadron operating JF-17 Block 2s, No 4 AWACS Squadron operating Karakoram Eagle AWACS, No 7 TA Squadron operating Mirage 3 ROSE 1, No 8 TA Squadron operating JF-17 Block 3s, No 22 OCU operating Mirage 3EL/D and No 84 CSS operating AW-139 Seahawk CSAR helicopters. Base is also home to College of Aviation safety management and Tactical Air Support school (TASS).

== See also ==
- List of Pakistan Air Force Bases
- List of airports in Pakistan
- Masroor Colony
