= List of Pakistan Air Force bases =

This is a list of air bases of the Pakistan Air Force. There are a total of 40 air bases, which are classified into two categories: flying bases and non-flying bases. Flying bases are operational bases from which aircraft operate during peacetime and wartime; whereas non-flying bases conduct either training, administration, maintenance, or mission support.

== Flying Bases (Major Operational Bases) ==
Map of this section's coordinates

List
Air Base	Location	Wing	Squadron	Aircraft	Coordinates and Notes
Northern Air Command
PAF Base Peshawar	Peshawar	No. 36 (Tactical Attack) Wing	No. 26 MR; No. 17 AS; No. 81 SAR	JF-17 Block III; F-7PG; Alouette III	33.9944°N 71.5289°E
PAF Base M.M. Alam	Mianwali	No. 37 (Combat Training) Wing	No. 1 FCU; No. 20 OCU; No. 86 SAR	K-8P; F-7PG, FT-7P; Alouette III	32°33′47″N 71°34′15″E
PAF Base Minhas	Kamra, Attock	No. 33 (Tactical) Wing	No. 15 MR; No. 16 OCU; No. 3 EW; No. 87 SAR	J-10 CE; JF-17 Block III; Saab 2000 Erieye; Alouette III, Mi-171Sh	33°52′8″N 72°24′3″E
PAF Base Nur Khan	Rawalpindi	No. 35 (Composite Air Transport) Wing	No. 6 ATS; No. 10 MRTT; No. 12 VIP; No. 41 VIP; No. 52 AM	C-130; IL-78; Gulf Stream IV; Embraer Phenom 100, Cessna, Beech, Y-12, CN-235-220	33°37′3″N 73°5′56″E; Also home to Federal Air Command.
PAF Academy Asghar Khan	Risalpur	(Flying Training) Wing	PFT; BFT; AJT; Sherdils	Mushshak; T-37; K-8; K-8	34°04′52″N 071°58′21″E
Central Air Command
PAF Base Mushaf	Sargodha	No. 38 (Tactical) Wing	No. 9 MR; No. 24 EW; CCS F-16; CCS F-7; CCS Mirage; CCS JF-17; No. 29 MR; No. 82 SAR	F-16 AM/BM; Falcon 20 F/G; F-16 AM/BM; F-7P; Mirage 5PA; JF-17 Thunder; Alouette III	32°02′55″N 72°39′55″E
PAF Base Rafiqui	Shorkot	No. 34 (Tactical Attack) Wing	No. 14 AS; No. 22 OCU; No. 27 TA; No. 83 SAR	JF-17 |Mirage IIIEP/RP Mirage 5 ROSE-II; Mirage ROSE-III; Alouette III	30°45′29″N 72°16′57″E
Southern Air Command
PAF Base Masroor	Karachi	No. 32 (Tactical Attack) Wing; No. 8 MR; No. 84 SAR JF-17 Block III; AW-139 Seahawk	24°53′37″N 66°56′20″E		
PAF Base Shahbaz	Jacobabad	No. 39 (Tactical) Wing No. 5 MR; No. 11 MR; No. 88 SAR F-16 C/D Block 52+ F-16 AM/BM Block 15 MLU; Leonardo AW-139	28°17′4″N 68°27′1″E		
PAF Base Samungli	Quetta	No. 31 (Air Superiority) Wing	No. 28 MR; No. 85 SAR	JF-17 Thunder; Alouette III	30°14′34″N 66°56′26″E
PAF Base Bholari	Bholari, Jamshoro	No. 41 (Tactical) Wing	No. 19 OCU, No. 18 OCU, No.53 AEW&C	F-16 A/B Block 15 ADF; JF-17 A/B Block 2 Saab 2000 Erieye	25°14′35″N 68°02′11″E
PAF Base Faisal	Karachi	No. 40 (Air Mobility) Wing	No. 21 ATS	C-130	24°52′42″N 67°6′56″E

== Flying Bases (Forward Operational Bases) ==
Map of this section's coordinates

List
Air Base	Location	Coordinates	Notes
Northern Air Command
PAF Base Murid	Chakwal	32°54′36″N 72°46′26″E	
PAF Base Qadri	Skardu	35°20′30″N 75°31′21″E	
PAF Base Islamabad	Islamabad	33°32′35″N 72°50′22″E	
Central Air Command
PAF Base Farid	Rajanpur	25°15′51″N 70°11′36″E	
PAF Base Multan	Multan	30°11′56″N 71°25′01″E	
PAF Base Risalewala	Faisalabad	31°22′14″N 73°00′11″E	
PAF Base Chandhar	Gujranwala	32°04′42″N 73°47′17″E	
PAF Base Vehari	Vehari	30°04′49″N 72°09′07″E	
PAF Base Rahimyar Khan	Rahimyar Khan	28°23′38″N 70°17′08″E	
PAF Base Lahore	Lahore	31°31′15″N 74°23′31″E	
PAF Base Bahawalpur	Bahawalpur	29°20′50″N 71°42′17″E	
Southern Air Command
PAF Base Sukkur	Sukkur	27°43′12″N 68°47′21″E	
PAF Base Talhar	Badin	24°50′10″N 68°49′34″E	
PAF Base Sindhri	Mirpur Khas	25°41′15″N 69°05′02″E	
PAF Base Nawabshah	Shaheed Benazirabad District	26°12′40″N 68°22′58″E	
PAF Base Pasni	Pasni, Gwadar	25°17′26″N 63°20′57″E	
PAF Base Gwadar (old site)	Gwadar	25°14′04″N 62°20′15″E	
PAF Base Karachi	Karachi	24°54′19″N 67°08′53″E	

== Non-flying bases ==
Air Base	Location	Coordinates	Notes
Northern Air Command
PAF Camp Badaber	Peshawar		
PAF Base Lower Topa	Murree		
PAF Base Kohat	Kohat		
PAF Base Kalabagh	Nathia Gali		
PAF Base Kallar Kahar	Kallar Kahar		
Chilas Airfield	Chilas		
Miranshah Airfield	North Waziristan District		
Central Air Command
PAF Base Lahore	Lahore		
PAF Base Sakesar	Sakesar		
Southern Air Command
PAF Base Korangi Creek	Karachi	24°46′56″N 67°08′11″E	
PAF Base Malir	Karachi		
Shamsi Airfield	Washuk District		
PAF Ormara	Ormara, Gwadar		

== Planned bases ==
- Pakistan Air Force plans to construct a new air base in Notal area of Nasirabad District in Balochistan and in Mansehra District of Khyber Pakhtunkhwa.

== See also ==
- List of Pakistan Air Force centres and depots
- List of Pakistan Air Force squadrons
- List of Pakistan Air Force air defence squadrons
- Air base
- List of countries with overseas military bases
