= List of Pakistan Air Force centers and depots =

The following is a list of centers and depots of the Pakistan Air Force sorted by branch.

== Engineering Depots ==
Unit	Base	Established	Status	Notes
No. 102 Air Engineering Depot	PAF Base Faisal	1921	Active	
No. 104 Air Engineering Depot	PAF Base Nur Khan	1947	Active	
No. 105 Air Engineering Depot	PAF Base Malir	1943	Active	
No. 106 Air Engineering Depot	Nowshera Cantonment	1948	Active	
No. 107 Air Engineering Depot	Classified	1954	Active	
No. 108 Air Engineering Depot	PAF Base Nur Khan	1958	Active	
No. 109 Air Engineering Depot	PAF Camp Badaber	1979	Active	
No. 114 Air Engineering Depot	PAF Base Mushaf	1990	Active	
No. 115 Air Engineering Depot	PAF Base Malir	2011	Active	
No. 118 Software Engineering Depot	Classified	1983	Active	
No. 130 Air Engineering Depot	PAF Base Nur Khan	1993	Active	

== Logistics Centers & Depots ==
Unit	Base	Established	Status	Notes
No. 101 Air Logistics Centre	PAF Base Faisal	1921	Active	
No. 103 Air Logistics Centre	PAF Base Nur Khan	1955	Active	
No. 110 Air Logistics Depot	PAF Camp Badaber	1973	Active	
No. 120 Air Logistics Depot	PAF Base Mushaf	1984	Active	
No. 121 Air Logistics Depot	PAF Base Shahbaz	2010	Active	
No. 122 Air Logistics Depot	PAF Base Minhas	2022	Active	

== See also ==
- List of Pakistan Air Force squadrons
- List of Pakistan Air Force bases
- List of Pakistan Air Force air defence squadrons
