= List of Pakistan Air Force air defence squadrons =

This is a list of squadrons from the Pakistan Air Force's Air Defence branch organized according to their type and role.

== Command & Control Centers ==
Unit	Founded	Based	Sector	Status	Notes
No. 481 Mission Control Centre	1979	PAF Base Lahore	CENSEC	Active	
No. 482 Mission Control Centre	1979	PAF Base Malir	SOUSEC	Disbanded	
No. 483 Mission Control Centre	1979	PAF Base MM Alam	CENSEC	Active	
No. 484 Mission Control Centre	1979	PAF Base Shahbaz	SOUSEC	Active	
No. 485 Mission Control Centre	1980	PAF Base Rafiqui	CENSEC	Active	
No. 486 Mission Control Centre	1980	PAF Base Nur Khan	NORSEC	Active	
No. 487 Mission Control Centre	1979	PAF Base Samungli	WESSEC	Active	
No. 488 Mission Control Centre	2020	PAF Base Qadri	NORSEC	Active	
No. 489 Mission Control Centre	2021	PAF Base Samungli	WESSEC	Active	

== Surveillance squadrons ==
Unit	Base	Equipment	Status	Notes
No. 401 Squadron	PAF Base Samungli	TPS-43G, MPDR-90P, MPRD-45E	Active	
No. 402 Squadron	PAF Base Minhas	TPS-43G	Active	
No. 403 Squadron	PAF Base Lahore	TPS-43J	Active	
No. 406 Squadron	PAF Camp Sukkur	TPS-43G	Active	
No. 408 Squadron	PAF Camp Badin	TPS-43G	Active	
No. 410 Squadron	PAF Base Sakesar	YLC-2	Active	
No. 411 Squadron	PAF Base Murid	YLC-2	Inactive	
No. 412 Squadron	PAF Base Malir	YLC-2	Active	
No. 414 Squadron	PAF Base Rafiqui	YLC-2	Active	
No. 901 Squadron	PAF Base Mushaf	TPS-77	Active	
No. 902 Squadron	PAF Base Lower Topa	TPS-77	Active	
No. 903 Squadron	PAF Base Malir	YLC-18A	Active	
No. 905 Squadron	PAF Base Bholari	TPS-77	Active	
No. 906 Squadron	PAF Base Masroor	YLC-18A	Active	
No. 907 Squadron	PAF Base Multan	TPS-77	Active	
No. 908 Squadron	PAF Base Samungli	YLC-18A	Active	
No. 909 Squadron	PAF Base Qadri	TPS-77	Active	
No. 4091 Squadron		TPS-77	Active	
No. 4092 Squadron	PAF base rafiqui	TPS-77	Active	
No. 4093 Squadron	PAF Base Korangi Creek	TPS-77	Active	
No. 4094 Squadron	PAF Base Shahbaz	TPS-77	Inactive	
No. 4095 Squadron	PAF Base Peshawar	TPS-77	Active	
No. 4096 Squadron	PAF Base Mushaf	TPS-77	Active	

== Surface to Air Missile (SAM) squadrons ==
Unit	Founded	Based	Equipment	Status	Notes
No. 451 Squadron	1991	PAF Camp Sihala	SPADA-2000, Mistral	Active	
No. 452 Squadron	1950	PAF Base Peshawar	SPADA-2000, Mistral, HQ-16FE	Active	
No. 453 Squadron	1982	PAF Base Nur Khan	SPADA-2000, HQ-16FE	Active	Took part in the 2016 Pakistan Day parade.
No. 454 Squadron	1982	PAF Camp Pasni	SPADA-2000, HQ-16FE, Mistral	Active	
No. 456 Squadron	1976	PAF Base Shahbaz	Crotale-2000, SPADA-2000, HQ-16FE	Active	
No. 457 Squadron	1977	PAF Camp Kahuta	Crotale, SPADA-2000	Active	Takes part in the Pakistan Day Parade annually.
No. 458 Squadron	2007	PAF Base Lahore	HQ-16FE, Crotale	Active	
No. 459 Squadron	2011	PAF Base Lahore	Crotale, HQ-16FE	Active	
No. 460 Squadron	1978	PAF Base Samungli	Crotale, Mistral, HQ-16FE	Active	

== Balloon Barrage Units (BBU) ==
Unit	Deployed	Equipment	Founded	Status	Notes
No. 601 Balloon Barrage Wing	PAF Camp Badaber	Barrage balloons	1973	Active	
No. 6012 Balloon Barrage Unit	PAF Base Mushaf	Barrage balloons	1977	Inactive	
No. 6013 Balloon Barrage Unit	PAF Base Peshawar	Barrage balloons	1981	Inactive	
No. 6014 Balloon Barrage Unit	PAF Base Masroor	Barrage balloons	1982	Inactive	
No. 6015 Balloon Barrage Unit	PAF Base Samungli	Barrage balloons	1981	Inactive	
No. 6016 Balloon Barrage Squadron	KRL	Barrage balloons	1977	Inactive	

== Mobile Observer Units (MOU) ==
Unit	Founded	Based	Status	Notes
No. 246 Squadron	1959	PAF Camp Sihala	Active	
No. 247 Squadron	1959	PAF Base Korangi Creek	Disbanded	
No. 248 Squadron	1965	PAF Camp Sihala	Active	

== See also ==
- List of Pakistan Air Force aircraft squadrons
