= List of Pakistan Air Force squadrons =

The following is a list of all active aircraft squadrons of the Pakistan Air Force (PAF), sorted by type. Squadrons are listed by their current names and roles.

== Aerial Refueling Squadrons ==
Squadron	Nickname	Role	Command	Wing	Date Established	Base	Aircraft	Notes
No. 10 Squadron	Bulls	Multi-role Tanker Transport	Air Defence Command	35 Composite Air Transport Wing	15 August 1959	PAF Base Nur Khan	Il-78MP	

== Aerobatics Display Squadrons ==
Squadron	Nickname	Role	Command	Wing	Date Established	Base	Aircraft	Notes
PAF Formation Aerobatics Team	Sherdils	Aerobatics Display	Air Defence Command	College of Flying Training	17 August 1972	PAF Academy Asghar Khan	K-8P	

== Airborne Early Warning Squadrons ==
Squadron	Nickname	Role	Command	Wing	Date Established	Base	Aircraft	Notes
No. 3 Squadron	Angels	AEW&C	Northern Air Command	33 Tactical Wing	1 July 1957	PAF Base Minhas	Saab 2000 Erieye	
No. 4 Squadron	Karakoram Eagles	AEW&C	Southern Air Command	32 TA Wing	15 August 1959	PAF Base Masroor	ZDK-03	
No. 53 Squadron	Hawks	AEW&C	Southern Air Command	41 Tactical Wing	1 July 2021	PAF Base Bholari	Saab 2000 Erieye	

== Combat Squadrons ==
Squadron	Nickname	Role	Command	Wing	Date Established	Base	Aircraft	Notes
No. 2 Squadron	Minhasians	Multi-role	Southern Air Command	39 Tactical Wing	15 April 1956	PAF Base Masroor	JF-17	
No. 5 Squadron	Falcons	Multi-role	Southern Air Command	39 Tactical Wing	15 August 1947	PAF Base Shahbaz	F-16C/D	
No. 7 Squadron	Bandits	Tactical Attack	Southern Air Command	32 TA Wing	June 1960	PAF Base Masroor	Mirage III ROSE I	
No. 8 Squadron	Haiders	Tactical Attack	Southern Air Command	32 TA Wing	11 May 1960	PAF Base Masroor	JF-17	
No. 9 Squadron	Griffins	Multi-role	Central Air Command	38 MR Wing	3 January 1944	PAF Base Mushaf	F-16AM/BM	
No. 11 Squadron	Arrows	Multi-role	Southern Air Command	39 Tactical Wing	1 January 1949	PAF Base Shahbaz	F-16AM/BM	
No. 14 Squadron	Tail Choppers	Air Superiority	Central Air Command	34 TA Wing	1 November 1948	PAF Base Rafiqui	JF-17	
No. 15 Squadron	Cobras	Multi-role	Northern Air Command	33 Tactical Wing	5 June 1955	PAF Base Minhas	J-10CE	
No. 16 Squadron	Black Panthers	Multi-role	Northern Air Command	33 Tactical Wing	April 1957	PAF Base Minhas	JF-17	
No. 17 Squadron	Tigers	Air Superiority	Northern Air Command	36 TA Wing	1 April 1957	PAF Base Peshawar	F-7PG	
No. 25 Squadron	Eagles	Tactical Attack	Central Air Command	34 TA Wing	January 1966	PAF Base Rafiqui	Mirage 5 ROSE	
No. 26 Squadron	Black Spiders	Multi-role	Northern Air Command	36 TA Wing	30 August 1967	PAF Base Peshawar	JF-17	
No. 27 Squadron	Zarrars	Tactical Attack	Central Air Command	34 TA Wing	April 2007	PAF Base Rafiqui	Mirage 5 ROSE	
No. 28 Squadron	Phoenixes	Multi-role	Western Air Command	31 AS Wing	28 February 2018	PAF Base Samungli	JF-17	
No. 50 Squadron	Saf Shikan	Tactical Attack	Central Air Command	34 TA Wing	16 December 2021	PAF Base Rafiqui	Mirage 5PA	

== Combat Commanders' School Squadrons ==
Squadron	Nickname	Role	Command	Wing	Date Established	Base	Aircraft	Notes
No. 23 Squadron	Talons	Advanced Air Combat Tactics Development & Training	Central Air Command	Airpower Centre of Excellence	16 March 1961	PAF Base Mushaf	F-7PG	
No. 29 Squadron	Aggressors	Advanced Air Combat Tactics Development & Training	Central Air Command	Airpower Centre of Excellence	16 July 1988	PAF Base Mushaf	F-16AM/BM	
CCS JF-17 Squadron	Dashings	Advanced Air Combat Tactics Development & Training	Central Air Command	Airpower Centre of Excellence	26 January 2015	PAF Base Mushaf	JF-17	
CCS Mirage Squadron	Sky Bolts	Advanced Air Combat Tactics Development & Training	Central Air Command	Airpower Centre of Excellence	5 May 1976	PAF Base Mushaf	Mirage III ROSE I Mirage 5PA	

== Electronic Warfare Squadrons ==
Squadron	Nickname	Role	Command	Wing	Date Established	Base	Aircraft	Notes
No. 24 Squadron	Blinders	Electronic Warfare	Central Air Command	38 MR Wing	December 1962	PAF Base Mushaf	Falcon 20	

== Search and Rescue Squadrons ==
Squadron	Nickname	Role	Command	Wing	Date Established	Base	Aircraft	Notes
No. 81 Squadron	Kangaroos	SAR	Northern Air Command	36 TA Wing	1965	PAF Base Peshawar	Alouette III	Also HFTS
No. 82 Squadron	Stallions	Combat Support	Central Air Command	38 MR Wing	1967	PAF Base Mushaf	AW139M	
No. 83 Squadron	Kites	SAR	Central Air Command	34 TA Wing	1972	PAF Base Rafiqui	Alouette III	
No. 84 Squadron	Dolphins	Combat Support	Southern Air Command	32 TA Wing	1968	PAF Base Masroor	AW139M Mi-171Sh	
No. 85 Squadron	Saviours	SAR	Western Air Command	31 AS Wing	12 March 1968	PAF Base Samungli	Alouette III	
No. 86 Squadron	Ababeel	SAR	Northern Air Command	37 Combat Training Wing	October 1983	PAF Base M M Alam	Alouette III	
No. 87 Squadron	Dragonflies	SAR	Northern Air Command	33 Tactical Wing	July 1997	PAF Base Minhas	Alouette III Mi-171Sh	
No. 88 Squadron	Rams	Combat Support	Southern Air Command	39 Tactical Wing	March 2018	PAF Base Shahbaz	AW139M	Also AHTS

== Training Squadrons ==
Squadron	Nickname	Role	Command	Wing	Date Established	Base	Aircraft	Notes
No. 1 Squadron	Rahbers	Fighter Conversion Unit	Northern Air Command	37 Combat Training Wing	28 April 1975	PAF Base M M Alam	K-8P	
No. 18 Squadron	Sharp Shooters	Operational Conversion Unit	Southern Air Command	41 Tactical Wing	1 February 1958	PAF Base Bholari	JF-17B	
No. 19 Squadron	Sherdils	Operational Conversion Unit	Southern Air Command	41 Tactical Wing	1 February 1958	PAF Base Bholari	F-16 ADF	
No. 20 Squadron	Cheetahs	Operational Conversion Unit	Northern Air Command	37 Combat Training Wing	March 1956	PAF Base M M Alam	F-7PG	
No. 22 Squadron	Ghazis	Operational Conversion Unit	Southern Air Command	32 TA Wing	June 1984	PAF Base Masroor	Mirage III	
1 PFT Squadron		Primary Flying Training	Air Defence Command	Primary Flying Training Wing	1947	PAF Academy Asghar Khan	Super Mushshak	
2 PFT Squadron		Primary Flying Training	Air Defence Command	Primary Flying Training Wing	1947	PAF Academy Asghar Khan	Super Mushshak	
1 BFT Squadron		Basic Flying Training	Air Defence Command	Basic Flying Training Wing	July 1974	PAF Academy Asghar Khan	T-37B/C	
2 BFT Squadron		Basic Flying Training	Air Defence Command	Basic Flying Training Wing	July 1974	PAF Academy Asghar Khan	T-37B/C	
1 AJT Squadron		Advanced Jet Training	Air Defence Command	Advanced Jet Training Wing	1994	PAF Academy Asghar Khan	K-8P	
Flying Instructors School		Instructor Training	Air Defence Command	College of Flying Training	15 April 1952	PAF Academy Asghar Khan	T-37 / K-8P	
Shooter Squadron		Lead-In Fighter Training	Northern Air Command	37 Combat Training Wing	11 December 2017	PAF Base M M Alam	F-7P	
Transport Conversion School		Transport Conversion	Air Defence Command	35 Composite Air Transport Wing	April 1975	PAF Base Nur Khan	C-130	

== Transport Squadrons ==
Squadron	Nickname	Role	Command	Wing	Date Established	Base	Aircraft	Notes
No. 6 Squadron	Antelopes	Air Transport	Northern Air Command	No. 35 Air Mobility Wing	1 December 1942	PAF Base Nur Khan	C-130 L-100	
No. 12 Squadron	Burraqs	VIP Transport	Northern Air Command	No. 35 Air Mobility Wing	March 1950	PAF Base Nur Khan	A319 GIV-SP Global 6000 Citation Excel	
No. 21 Squadron	Globe Trotters	Air Transport	Southern Air Command	No. 40 Air Mobility Wing	15 November 2006	PAF Base Faisal	C-130 Saab 2000	
No. 41 Squadron	Albatross	VIP Light Communication	Northern Air Command	No. 35 Air Mobility Wing	June 1966	PAF Base Nur Khan	Phenom 100 Y-12II	
No. 52 Squadron	Markhors	Air Transport	Northern Air Command	No. 35 Air Mobility Wing	14 March 2020	PAF Base Nur Khan	CN-235; Super King Air	

== Unmanned Squadrons ==
Squadron	Nickname	Role	Command	Wing	Date Established	Base	Aircraft	Notes
No. 60 Squadron	Pegasus	Reconnaissance		No. 42 Wing	April 2007	PAF Base Murid	Shahpar	
No. 61 Squadron		Armed reconnaissance		No. 42 Wing	April 2007	PAF Base Murid	Burraq Shahpar	
No. 62 Squadron	Hoopoes	ISR & OCU		No. 42 Wing	September 2003	PAF Base Murid	Falco	
No. 63 Squadron	Harriers	ISR	Northern Air Command		10 August 2021	PAF Base M M Alam	Wing Loong II	
No. 64 Squadron		ISO	Northern Air Command	No. 42 Wing	March 2022	PAF Base Murid	Bayraktar TB2	
No. 65 Squadron	Knights	Multi-role		No. 42 Wing	March 2023	PAF Base Murid	Bayraktar Akinci	

== See also ==
- List of Pakistan Air Force bases
- List of Pakistan Air Force air defence squadrons
- List of Pakistan Air Force wings
- Pakistan Air Force
- Pakistan Naval Air Arm
