= Murid (disambiguation) =

In Sufism, a murid is an initiate under a spiritual guide. The word has come to designate several specific historical episodes:

- the Murīdūn, a rebellious Sufi order in 12th-century Al-Andalus (now Spain)
- the Murid War, or 19th-century Russian conquest of Chechnya and Dagestan
- the Mouride brotherhood, a prominent Sufi order in contemporary West Africa

Murid may also refer to:

- A member of the mouse family Muridae
- Murid (Chakwal), town in Punjab, Pakistan
  - PAF Base Murid, air base in Murid
- Mirik, Iran, also known as Murid
