= List of Pakistan Air Force wings =

This is an organized list of all active Wings of the Pakistan Air Force. They might have changed designations and roles various times over the years, so they are listed by their current designation.

== Combat wings ==
Wing	Motto	Base	Command	Notes
Special Services Wing		PAF Base Kallar Kahar	Classified	
No. 31 Tactical Wing	برق رفتار و مثل زوالفقار	PAF Base Samungli	Western Air Command	
No. 32 Tactical Attack Wing	سُلطان بحر و بَر	PAF Base Masroor	Southern Air Command	
No. 33 Tactical Wing	شمشیر کشور کُشاء	PAF Base Minhas	Northern Air Command	
No. 34 Tactical Attack Wing	برقِ اجل	PAF Base Rafiqui	Central Air Command	
No. 36 Tactical Attack Wing	خنجرِ براں صفت	PAF Base Peshawar	Northern Air Command	
No. 38 Tactical Wing	ضربِ غازیاں	PAF Base Mushaf	Central Air Command	
No. 39 Tactical Wing	پہاڑ اِس کی زربوں سے ریگِ رواں	PAF Base Shahbaz	Southern Air Command	
No. 41 Tactical Wing	جہادِ زندگانی میں ہیں یے مردوں کی شمشیریں	PAF Base Bholari	Southern Air Command	
No. 42 Flying Wing		PAF Base Murid	Central Air Command	

== Transport wings ==
Wing	Motto	Base	Command	Notes
No. 35 Air Mobility Wing	مِرا ارتقاء ہے مسلسل سفر	PAF Base Nur Khan	Federal Air Command	
No. 40 Air Mobility Wing	جھانِ خشک و تر، زیر و زبر کر	PAF Base Faisal	Southern Air Command	

== Training wings ==
Wing	Motto	Base	Command	Notes
Flying Training Wing	زوقِ پرواز	PAF Academy	Western Air Command	
No. 37 Combat Training Wing	گرم دمِ جستجو	PAF Base MM Alam	Central Air Command	

== See also ==
- List of Pakistan Air Force aircraft squadrons
- List of Royal Australian Air Force wings
- List of wings of the Royal Air Force
- List of wings of the United States Air Force
