= No. 4 squadron PAF =

Pakistani air force unit

No. 4 Squadron
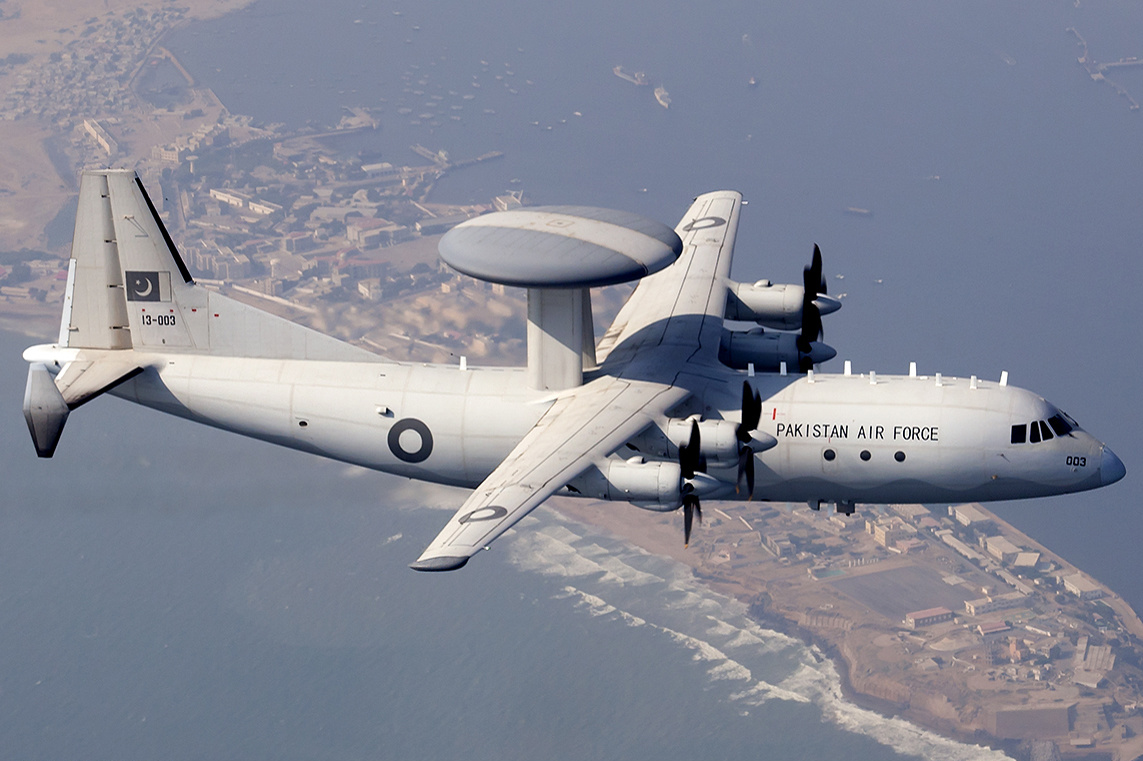
- One of the 4 ZDK-03 aircraft of the squadron flying over Manora coastline.
- Active: Since 15 August 1959 (66 years, 7 months)
- Disbanded: 1969-2011
- Country: Pakistan
- Allegiance: Pakistan Air Force
- Type: Squadron
- Role: Airborne Command and Control
- Part of: 32 Wing
- Airbase: PAF Base Masroor
- Nickname: Karakorum Eagles
- Motto: Urdu: نگاہ وہ ہے کہ محتاج مہر و ماہ نہیں
- Mascot: Eagle
- Engagements: 1965 Indo-Pakistani War; Operation Swift Retort; 2025 India-Pakistan conflict
- Website: www.paf.gov.pk

Aircraft flown
- Helicopter: Sikorsky H-19 Chickasaw
- Patrol: Grumman HU-16 Albatross
- Reconnaissance: ZDK-03

The No. 4 AEW&C Squadron nicknamed Karakorum Eagles is an airborne early warning unit of the Pakistan Air Force's 32nd Air Mobility Wing. It operates ZDK-03 early warning aircraft from PAF Base Masroor.

== History ==
The squadron's history traces its roots back to January 1958, when a maritime flight of 2 Grumman HU-16 Albatross was established operating under the supervision of 12 Squadron at Mauripur airbase. The unit was transformed into a fully functioning squadron on 15 August 1959, under which its fleet was expanded with more Albatross seaplanes, Bristol Freighters, and Sikorsky H-19 Chickasaw helicopters. The unit was temporarily disbanded in March 1969 after H-19s were retired from air force service, with its Albatrosses being put in storage.

On 11 August 2011, the squadron was reactivated as an Airborne Early Warning unit with 4 ZDK-03 AEW&C aircraft.

=== Operational history ===
==== 1965 War ====
While under the command of Squadron Leader Afsar Khan Jadoon, the squadron's H-19Ds undertook several covert operations in close co-operation with the Pakistan Army while the HU-16s saw maritime patrol missions over the Arabian Sea in close coordination with the Pakistan Navy throughout the 16-day war.

==== 2019 and 2025 conflicts with India ====
The squadron remained alert during Operation Swift Retort with the unit being deployed at its wartime locations. Similar wartime alerts were seen during Marka-e-Haq in 2025.

== See also ==
- List of AEW&C aircraft operators
- List of Pakistan Air Force squadrons
