= No. 50 Squadron PAF =

No. 50 Squadron
- Active: Since December 2021 (3 years, 5 months)
- Country: Pakistan
- Allegiance: Pakistan Air Force
- Branch: GD(P)/Flying
- Type: Squadron
- Role: Tactical Attack
- Airbase: PAF Base Minhas
- Nickname(s): Saf Shikan
- Anniversaries: 1 December (Foundation day)

Aircraft flown
- Attack: Dassault Mirage-VEF Rose-III

The No. 50 Tactical Attack Squadron nicknamed Saf Shikan is a flying unit of the Pakistan Air Force (PAF) which operates ROSE-III upgraded Dassault Mirage-VEF strike fighters from PAF Base Minhas.

== Etymology ==
The 50 Squadron was nicknamed Saf shikan which means Column penetrator in Persian/Urdu. The horse riding warrior on the insignia symbolizes the squadron's resolve to spearhead PAF's tactical operations and its ability to penetrate deep into enemy territory with stand-off weapons.

== History ==
When the PAF decided to acquire the Chengdu J-10CEs, the 15 Squadron was chosen to be equipped with it. The 15 squadron's previous fleet of PAC upgraded Mirage-VEF ROSE-IIIs were still capable enough in modern warfare and since the PAF high command wasn't in the favor of retiring them, the No. 50 Squadron was raised on 1 December 2021 to inherit all of the No. 15 Squadron's Mirages and related assets.

== See also ==
- List of Pakistan Air Force squadrons
