= No. 41 Squadron PAF =

No. 41 VIP Light Communication Squadron
- Active: 23 June 1966 - present
- Country: Pakistan
- Allegiance: Pakistan Armed Forces
- Branch: Pakistan Air Force
- Type: Squadron
- Role: Military communications, Freight,
- Part of: No. 35 Wing
- Airbase: PAF Base Nur Khan
- Nickname: Albatross
- Mascot: Albatross
- Engagements: 2005 Kashmir Earthquake

Aircraft flown
- Trainer: T-6 Harvard; MFI-17 Mushshak
- Transport: Piper M600; Harbin Y-12; Embraer Phenom 100; Beechcraft Baron; Piper Seneca-II

No. 41 VIP Communication Squadron nicknamed Albatross is a military communications unit of the Pakistan Air Force. It is part of the 35th Air Mobility Wing, Federal Air Command and is located at PAF Base Nur Khan.

== History ==
The squadron's history traces back to the No. 41 Light Communications Flight which was raised at PAF Base Peshawar on 23 June 1966. It flew one Beechcraft, one Aero commander and one T-6G Harvard carrying out light transportation and communication duties including freight, mail and transport of PAF personnel. The mid-1970s saw four new Cessna 172 inducted into the squadron.

In 1985, the flight was re-established as the No. 41 VIP Light Communications Squadron and was shifted to PAF Base Nur Khan in 1988 where its offices were accommodated in mobile huts. In 1991, four Cessna-172 were purchased from the PIA. In October 1987, a government owned Piper Seneca-II was transferred from the Pakistan Atomic Energy Commission and added into the squadron's fleet. By 1993, the squadron started trials for the Harbin Y-12 which were successful with subsequent inductions of two Y-12s. In 1996, an MFI-17 was added to the squadron's fleet. In 1997, the squadron's offices were shifted to the HQ building of the No. 35 Wing.

By 1999, the PAF had realized the performance limitations of the No. 41 Squadron's propeller driven fleet, particularly their operational reach which was limited to bases in Northern and Central Air Commands along with maintenance issues with the vintage aircraft. Resultantly the piston engine fleet started being replaced. 4 Embraer Phenom 100s and one Harbin Y-12 were inducted by 2010. In July 2021, two more Phenom-100E were ferried from the UAE which were augmented into the squadron's fleet. A Piper M600 ferried from the US also joined the squadron in May 2022.

A notable occasion for the unit was when Squadron Leaders Nadia Gul and Saira Amin qualified as captains of Phenom 100 and Harbin Y-12 in 2016 and 2017 respectively from the Transport Conversion School. The duo was the first female pilots in Pakistan to become captains of the Phenom 100 and Harbin Y-12. The same year the squadron flew Mrs. Khalila Camacho on her visit to Pakistan on one of its Phenom 100s during which she was also given a tour of PAF Academy Asghar Khan.

== Operational history ==
The squadron's Y-12s took part in the airlift of humanitarian aid during the 2005 Earthquake carrying relief goods from around the country to Muzaffarabad. It also provided air ambulance services to seriously injured people from Northern Pakistan transporting them to medical facilities at Chaklala and mangla.

In the COVID-19 pandemic, the unit flew several sorties transporting necessary equipment including protection gear for doctors and medical staff to various PAF bases.

During Operation Swift Retort, the squadron flew a number of high priority missions.

== See also ==
- List of Pakistan Air Force squadrons
