= No. 10 Squadron PAF =

10 Multi-Role Tanker Transport Squadron
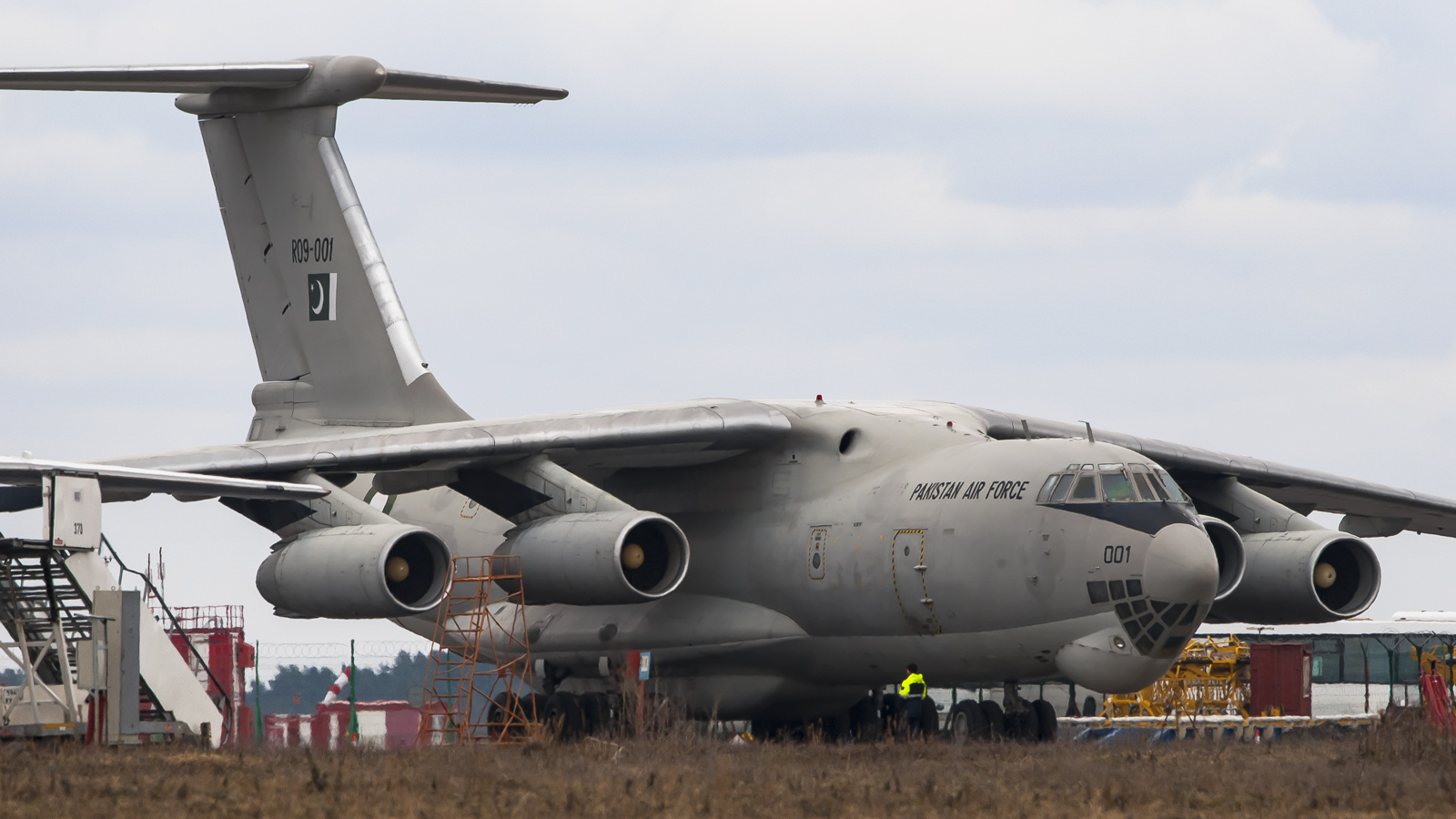
- An IL-78MP from 10 squadron.
- Active: Since 11 December 2009
- Country: Pakistan
- Allegiance: Pakistan Armed Forces
- Branch: Pakistan Air Force
- Type: Squadron
- Role: Airlift; Refueling
- Part of: 35 Air Mobility Wing
- Garrison/HQ: PAF Base Nur Khan
- Nickname: Bulls
- Motto: A Shaheen never gets tired from flight
- Mascot: A Bull
- Engagements: Operation Swift Retort; 2025 India-Pakistan conflict
- Website: paf.gov.pk

Aircraft flown
- Transport: Airbus A319
- Tanker: Ilyushin IL-78MP Midas

The No. 10 Multi Role Tanker Transport Squadron nicknamed the Bulls, is a multi-role airlift unit of the Pakistan Air Force serving as its only squadron which can undertake aerial refueling missions. It operates Ilyushin IL-78MP Midas and Airbus A319 multi-purpose tankers and flies them out of PAF Base Nur Khan under the Federal Air Command's 35th Air Mobility Wing.

== History ==
10 MRTT squadron's formation was officially approved on 11 December 2009. Its first IL-78MP (Serial#R09-001) arrived at PAF Base Chaklala 8 days later flown by a Ukrainian crew who subsequently initiated training of Pakistani airmen on the IL-78. Its remaining 3 IL-78MPs were also later airlifted to its home base.

In July 2022, the squadron inducted an Airbus A-319 in order to expand the PAF's overseas operations along with medical evacuation missions since it is being converted for air ambulance role.

=== Operational history ===
During Exercise High Mark in April 2010, the squadron's tankers executed a public display of aerial refueling over the thal firing ranges, the event was witnessed by high ranking government officials including then Prime Minister Yousaf Raza Gillani. In 2011, the squadron along with the 7 Tactical Attack Squadron's Mirages took part in an Air to Air refueling camp at PAF Base Masroor. Later that year, the squadron undertook its first international humanitarian relief aid mission when it hauled much needed supplies to flood victims in Sri-Lanka.

In September 2013, the squadron's IL-78s undertook relief missions in Balochistan during the 2013 Balochistan earthquakes. Upon the outbreak of the COVID-19 pandemic in Pakistan, the squadron remained at the forefront undertaking numerous airlift missions throughout China and Pakistan maintaining much needed supply of medical equipment to frontline doctors.

In April 2023, the squadron undertook HADR missions to airlift stranded Pakistanis in Sudan due to the outbreak of the 2023 civil war.

In 2025, one of the squadron's IL-78MP took part in the RIAT-2025 airshow alongside JF-17s and a C-130.
