= PAF Base Nur Khan =

Pakistan Air Force base in Islamabad

PAF Base Nur Khan
- پی اے ایف بیس نور خان
- Chaklala, Punjab in Pakistan
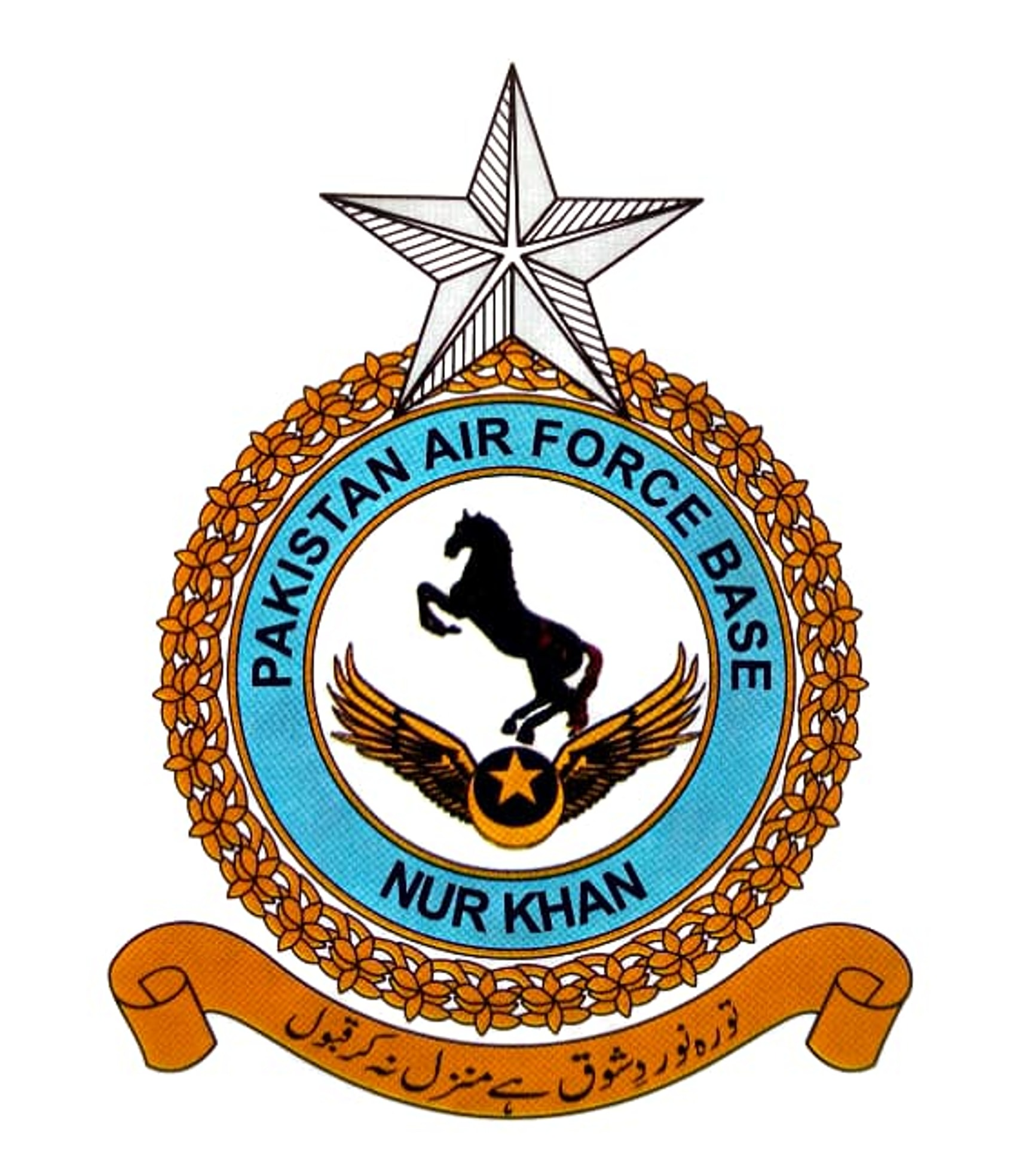

Site information
- Type: Military airbase
- Owner: Ministry of Defense
- Operator: Pakistan Air Force
- Controlled by: Federal Air Command
- Open to the public: Partially
- Other site facilities: 130 Air Engineering Depot; NASTP Alpha; CASS

Location
- Location of Nur Khan airbase in Pakistan PAF Base Nur Khan (Pakistan) PAF Base Nur Khan (Asia)
- Coordinates: 33°36′59″N 073°05′59″E

Site history
- Built: 1935; 91 years ago
- Built for: Royal Indian Air Force; Pakistan Air Force
- Built by: British Raj; Government of Pakistan (later upgradations)
- In use: 1935 – Present
- Battles/wars: World War II; 1st Kashmir War; 1965 Indo-Pakistani War; 1971 Indo-Pakistani War; Operation Bedaar; Operation Sentinel; Operation Swift Retort; 2025 India–Pakistan conflict

Garrison information
- Garrison: 35th Air Mobility Wing
- Occupants: 6 Air Mobility Squadron; 10 MRTT Squadron; 12 VIP Squadron; 41 VIP Comms Squadron; 52 Air Mobility Squadron

Airfield information
- Identifiers: IATA: NRK, ICAO: OPRN
- Elevation: 508.4 metres (1,668 ft) AMSL
Runways
Direction	Length and surface
12/30	3,291 metres (10,797 ft) Asphalt

Pakistan Air Force Base, Nur Khan (abbreviated PAF Base Nur Khan) (IATA: NRK, ICAO: OPRN) is a Pakistani military facility located in the town of Chaklala at Islamabad–Rawalpindi metropolitan area. The former Benazir Bhutto International Airport is integrated into the airbase's infrastructure.

The base is named after Air Marshal Nur Khan (1923–2011), former Commander-in-Chief of the Pakistan Air Force during the 1965 India-Pakistan War. The airbase is known for serving as the hub of PAF's air mobility operations and plays a key role in logistics, VIP transport, and strategic operations.

== History ==
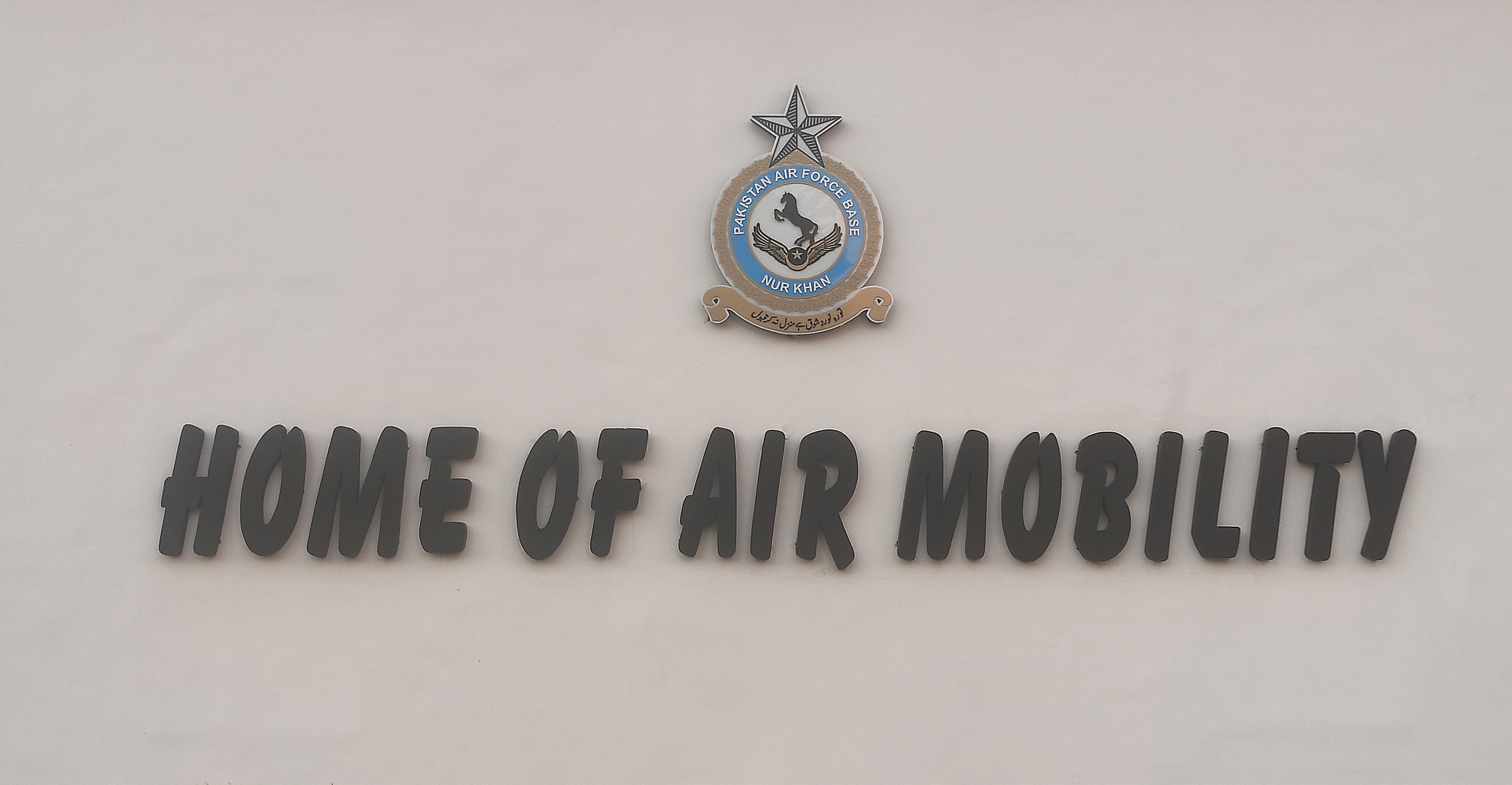
PAF Base Nur Khan

The base was originally operated by the Royal Air Force as RAF Chaklala and, during the Second World War, parachute training flights were conducted.

In 1947, it was transferred to the then Royal Pakistan Air Force (RPAF). Afterwards, it began use as a transport hub and forward base, with the PAF's fleet of various transport aircraft operating from it. By 1958, the base was equipped with five brick and steel hangars and accommodation for 1200 personnel. It had storage for 50,000 gallons of fuel.

In 1979, the base was home to both No. 15 Squadron PAF and No. 26 Squadron PAF with the North American F-86F Sabres and No. 6 Squadron PAF with the Lockheed C-130B/E Hercules & Lockheed L-100 Hercules.

After the Pakistan earthquake of 2005, 300 U.S. troops as well as U.S. aircraft were deployed to Chaklala to aid in relief efforts. According to an anonymous 2013 source, the U.S. had been allowed permanent military presence at Chaklala since late 2001 for handling logistics efforts and other movements in relation to the war in Afghanistan.

In 2009 the PAF's first of four Il-78 aerial refuelling tanker aircraft was delivered to PAF Base Chaklala and the No. 10 MRTT (Multi Role Tanker Transport) squadron was established there.

The name of the base was changed in 2012 from PAF Base Chaklala to PAF Base Nur Khan in remembrance of its first Base Commander in 1947, Air Marshal Nur Khan. Nur Khan was also the second Pakistani chief of the Pakistan Air Force and a veteran of several conflicts fought by Pakistan.

Five PAF F-16s escorted US Vice-president JD Vance's C-32 to Nur Khan base in Islamabad on 11 April 2026 for negotiations following the 2026 Iran war ceasefire.

=== Airstrikes ===
During the 2025 India–Pakistan conflict, the Indian Air Force carried out precision cruise missile airstrikes on several key military targets in Pakistan which included technical infrastructure, command and control centres, radar sites and weapon storage areas.

On 10 May, the Indian Air Force carried out airstrikes on the Nur Khan Airbase, targeting runways and military infrastructure. According to Indian defense officials, the operation was intended as a "calibrated response" to cross-border attacks. According to an eye-witness and two Pakistani security officials, the attack on Nur Khan airbase saw at least two missile strikes as well as drone attacks. Pakistan’s military stated that its air defense systems intercepted most of the incoming missiles, and no critical assets were lost. However, according to a Reuters citing an official who visited the base the next day, the barrage hit two roofs and hit the hangar of a refueling plane. According to William Goodhind, a geospatial analyst at Contested Ground, two mobile control centers at the Nur Khan airbase were damaged. Further The Washington Post, also reported videos recorded from a parking lot nearby which "showed smoke billowing from the damaged area". According to Air Forces Monthly, the missiles struck the operations room of the 35th Composite Transport Wing, destroying two fuel trucks and collaterally damaging one Lockheed C-130 Hercules of the No. 6 Squadron PAF at the aforementioned hangar.

A ceasefire was proposed after these airstrikes. Within hours of India's missile-drone strikes on several Pakistani airbases, especially Nur Khan, reportedly prompted US intervention for a ceasefire agreement. The base is a strategic asset for PAF as "one of the central transport hubs" and "home to the air refueling capability" (No. 10 Squadron). The facility is also just over a mile from the headquarters of Strategic Plans Division responsible for Pakistan's nuclear arsenal which includes over 170 warheads. The New York Times also cited a former American official who stated, "Pakistan's deepest fear is of its nuclear command authority being decapitated" and that the Indian missile strikes were interpreted to be a warning for India's capability to do the same. According to Christopher Clary, an associate professor at the University at Albany, "So, an attack on the facility may have been perceived as more dangerous than India intended – and the two sides should not conclude that it is possible to have a conflict without it going nuclear". On 14 May, Reuters reported that Indian strikes on Nur Khan airbase had alarmed US officials, due to the base's proximity to Pakistan's Strategic Plans Division.

The Afghan Taliban were reported by Indian sources to have launched drone strikes against PAF Nur Khan on 2 March 2026.

== Units ==
Flying and notable non-flying units based at Nur Khan airbase complex.

Pakistan Air Force

- Federal Air Command (FAC)
  - 35 Air Mobility Wing
    - 6 Squadron "Antelopes"
    - 10 Squadron "Bulls"
    - 12 Squadron "Burraqs"
    - 41 Squadron "Albatross"
    - 52 Squadron "Markhors"
  - No. 103 Air Logistics Centre
  - 104 Air Engineering Depot
  - 108 Air Engineering Depot
  - 130 Air Engineering Depot

Royal Air Force
The following British era squadrons were deployed here at some point:

- No. 5 Squadron RAF between 15 October 1935 and 23 April 1938 with the Westland Wapiti
- Detachment from No. 10 Squadron RAF between 5 October 1945 and 5 June 1946 with the Douglas Dakota
- No. 62 Squadron RAF between 24 May 1943 and 3 January 1944 with the Dakota and Lockheed Hudson VI
- No. 99 Squadron RAF between 3 April and 14 June 1943 with the Vickers Wellington III & X
- Detachment from No. 194 Squadron RAF between 18 September 1943 and 8 February 1944 with the Dakota
- No. 215 Squadron RAF between 13 October 1942 and 12 March 1943 with the Wellington IC
- Detachment from No. 298 Squadron RAF between 9 December 1945 and 20 May 1946 with the Handley Page Halifax A.7
- No. 670 Squadron RAF between 1 April and 1 July 1946
- No. 672 Squadron RAF between 1 April and 1 July 1946

== Location ==
The base has surrounding facilities including the Frontier Works Organization Headquarters, Chaklala Railway Station and the Joint Services Headquarters (JSHQ). Two housing schemes Askaris VIII and IX are also located alongside Nur Khan road that extends to the main entrance of the base from Airport Road. The Centre for Aerospace and Security Studies, a research think tank founded by the Pakistan Air Force, is located next to Nur Khan Base.

== See also ==
- List of Pakistan Air Force bases
