= No. 21 Squadron PAF =

No. 21 Squadron
- Active: Since 15 November 2006 (18 years, 11 months)
- Country: Pakistan
- Allegiance: Pakistan Air Force
- Branch: GD(P)/Flying
- Type: Squadron
- Role: Airlift
- Part of: No. 40 Air Mobility Wing
- Airbase: PAF Base Faisal
- Nickname: Globe Trotters
- Anniversaries: 15 November (Foundation day)

Aircraft flown
- Transport: Saab-2000; C-130B/E

The No. 21 Air Mobility Squadron also known by its nickname the Globe Trotters is a transport unit of the Pakistan Air Force's 40th Air Mobility Wing. The squadron is based at PAF Base Faisal and operates Lockheed C-130 Hercules and Saab-2000s.

== History ==
The 21 AM Squadron was originally established as a detachment of the 6 Squadron at PAF Base Faisal. Equipped with a few C-130s, the detachment was assigned the prime responsibility to provide airlift/air transport services to the Pakistan Armed Forces in the southern regions of Pakistan specifically to units along the coastal belt along the Arabian Sea. The detachment was re-established as the No. 21 Air Transport Squadron (ATS) in July 2008 retaining its previous role. The squadron's fleet was enlarged with the acquisitions of Saab-2000 airliners in 2014. These SAABs were later locally modified to carry FLIR seekers for undertaking of Intelligence, Surveillance and Reconnaissance (ISR) missions. In January 2022, the squadron was renamed as the No. 21 Air Mobility (AM) Squadron.

== Operational history ==
Over the years, the No. 21 AM squadron has carried out several humanitarian support missions around the world in collaboration with NGOs and government organizations like the NDMA.

The squadron took part in relief support operations for IDPs of the Swat conflict. Moreover, it carried out flood relief ops in southern Pakistan during the 2010, 2011 and 2012 floods at Nawabshah, Mirpur Khas, Sukkur and Jacobabad.

During the 2011 Japan Earthquake, the squadron's C-130s airlifted several tons worth relief goods to Japan. The same year, 94,000lbs humanitarian aid was airlifted to affected areas in Baluchistan within a span of 4 days.

The squadron remained actively involved in supporting roles during the launching phases of Operation Zarb-e-Azb and Giyari Operation while also holding an important role in supporting deployments of various armed forces units to their wartime locations most notably during Operation Swift Retort.

After the COVID-19 pandemic, the squadron carried out worldwide air mobility operations in support of PIA to transport Pakistani nationals stuck in various countries after international flights were halted. In the first mission, pilgrims stuck in Dalbandin were transported to Skardu.

=== Exercises ===
- JCPI-III - With the USAF
- Exercise High Mark
- Exercise Hawk Eye
- Exercise Barracuda - In collaboration with the navy.
- Royal International Air Tattoo 2017
- Royal International Air Tattoo 2020

== See also ==
List of Pakistan Air Force squadrons
