= No. 52 Squadron PAF =

No. 52 Squadron
- Active: Since 16 December 2019 (5 years, 4 months)
- Country: Pakistan
- Allegiance: Pakistan Air Force
- Branch: GD(P)/Flying
- Type: Squadron
- Role: Airlift
- Part of: No. 35 Air Mobility Wing
- Airbase: PAF Base Nur Khan
- Nickname(s): Markhors
- Mascot(s): Markhor
- Anniversaries: 16 December (Foundation day)

Aircraft flown
- Transport: CN-235 CASA; Beechcraft BKA-350i

The No. 52 Air Mobility Squadron nicknamed Markhors is a transport unit of the Pakistan Air Force's No. 35 Air Mobility Wing. It operates CN-235 CASA and Beechcraft BKA-350i transporters from PAF Base Nur Khan.

== History ==
Established on 16 December 2019, the No. 52 Air Mobility Squadron was equipped with CN-235 CASA tactical airlifters which previously served with the No. 6 Squadron and was tasked to provide tactical airlift to the Pakistan Armed Forces. On various occasions it has fulfilled this role by providing much needed tactical airlift to the army and navy by conducting operations in far flung areas like Miranshah, Saidu Sharif and Shamsi airstrips where modern landing strips are not available.

In 2022, the squadron's fleet was expanded with the induction of two Beechcraft BKA-350i for operations in the mountainous Northern areas of the country.

== See also ==
- List of Pakistan Air Force squadrons
