= PAF Base Rafiqui =

Pakistan Air Force base

PAF Base Rafiqui
- Jhang District, Punjab in Pakistan
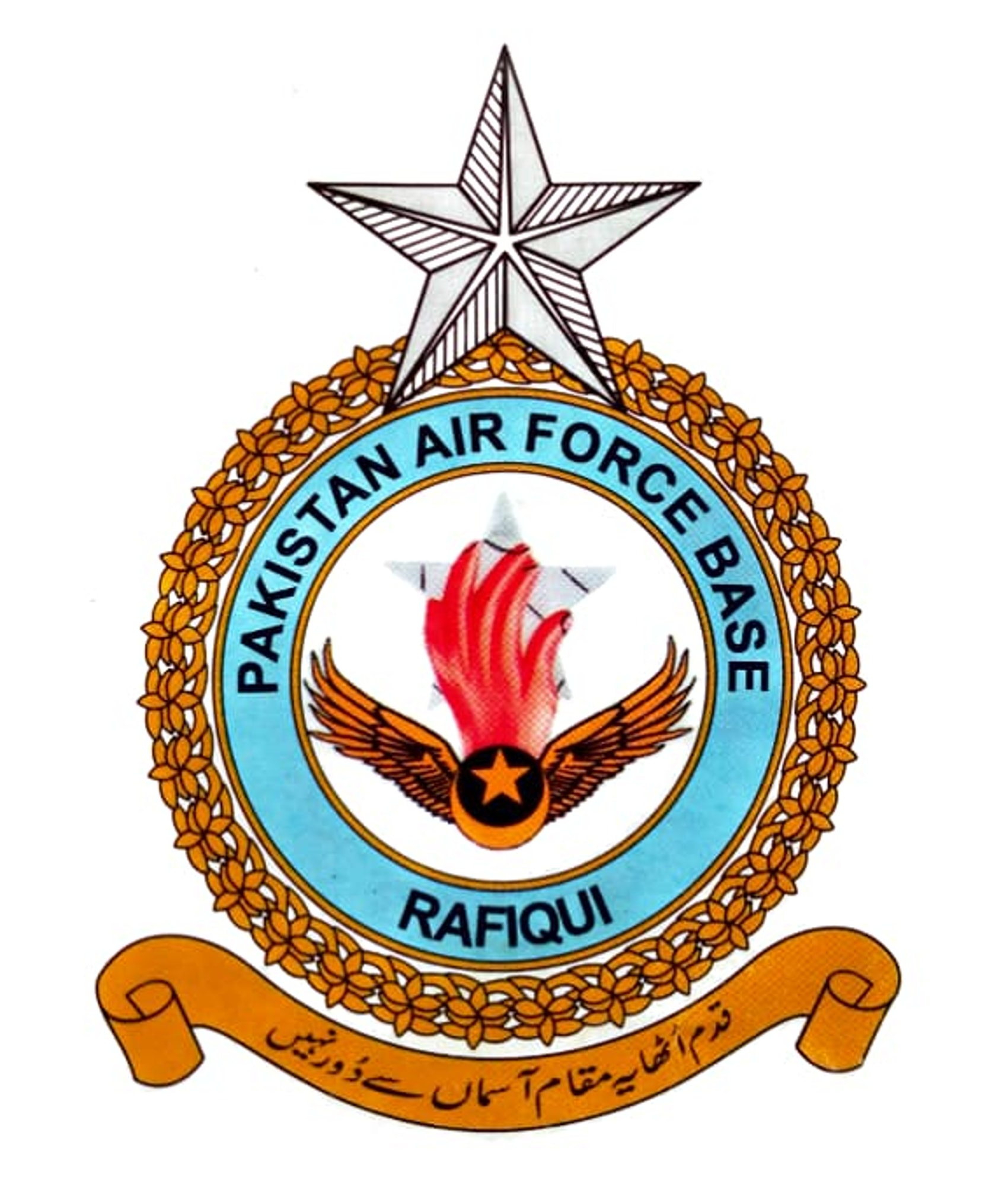

Site information
- Type: Air Force base
- Owner: Ministry of Defense
- Operator: Pakistan Air Force
- Controlled by: Central Air Command
- Condition: Operational
- Website: Pakistan Air Force

Location
- Shown within Punjab, Pakistan PAF Base Rafiqui (Pakistan)
- Coordinates: 30°45′29″N 72°16′57″E

Site history
- Built: 1968
- In use: 1968 - present
- Battles/wars: 1965 Indo-Pakistani war; 1971 Indo-Pakistani war; 2025 India-Pakistan conflict

Garrison information
- Current commander: Air Commodore
- Garrison: 34 Tactical Attack Wing
- Occupants: 14 Squadron "Tail Choppers"; 25 Squadron "Eagles"; 27 Squadron "Zarrars"; 50 Squadron "Saf Shikan"; 83 SAR Squadron "Kites"

Airfield information
- Identifiers: ICAO: OPRQ
- Elevation: 150 metres (492 ft) AMSL
Runways
Direction	Length and surface
15/33	3,048 metres (10,000 ft) Asphalt

Pakistan Air Force Base Rafiqui formerly known as PAF Base Shorkot (ICAO: OPRQ), is a Pakistan Air Force base located within the outskirts of Shorkot city in the Jhang District of Pakistan's Punjab province and around 337 kilometres (209 mi) south of Islamabad. The airbase was named in honor of Sarfaraz Ahmed Rafiqui, a war hero from the 1965 Indo-Pakistani war who is famous for fighting Indian Hawker Hunters and covering his flight members in an F-86 Sabre with jammed guns. It is the home of Central Air Command's 34th Tactical Attack Wing (34 TA Wing).

== History ==
In the aftermath of the 1965 Indo-Pakistani war, the AHQ commenced a survey to enhance the already deficient infrastructure of the air force. The high command's survey concluded with the decision to construct an alternative base to the main Sargodha airbase. For this purpose, two sites were chosen in 1966 for the new planned airbase at Jhang and Shorkot. The site at Jhang was preferred due to many factors but since there was pressure on the PAF not to construct a military base in such close proximity to the historic city of Jhang, the idea was dropped with the site at Shorkot ultimately selected and in 1968, a small satellite station named PAF Shorkot constructed there. During the 1971 war, it was activated and received its first base commander with No. 23 squadron deploying its F-6s there. The war made the PAF leadership realize the operational importance of the base and it was subsequently transformed into an MOB by 1973 and renamed PAF Base Rafiqui in honor of Sarfaraz Ahmed Rafiqui, a fallen fighter pilot of the 1965 war who is famous for leading airstrikes on the Indian military and recipient of both the Hilal-e-Jurat and Sitara-e-Jurat. Since the topography of the surrounding areas of the airbase was mostly barren lands, the base administration initiated a major development and forestation project which saw extensive transformation of the base's topography. Gardens, orchards, nurseries and plantations were grown which completely changed the base's overall geography.

=== 2025 Indian Airstrikes ===
On 10 May 2025, the airbase was targeted by Indian missile strikes during the 2025 India-Pakistan conflict though the Pakistan Armed Forces claimed its air defences had intercepted most of the rockets.

== Units ==
The base is home to the following squadrons:

- No. 14 Squadron "Tail Choppers"
- No. 25 Squadron "Eagles"
- No. 27 Squadron "Zarrars"
- No. 50 Squadron "Saf Shikan"
- No. 83 SAR Squadron "Kites"

== See also ==
- List of Pakistan Air Force Bases
