= No. 29 Squadron PAF =

No. 29 Squadron "Aggressors"
- Active: Since January 2019 (7 years, 8 months)
- Country: Pakistan
- Allegiance: Pakistan Air Force
- Branch: Combat Commander's School
- Type: Squadron
- Role: Aggressor emulation
- Airbase: PAF Base Mushaf
- Nickname: Aggressors
- Mottos: جس کی گرمی سے پگھل جائے ستاروں کا وجود (Urdu for 'The heat of which melts the stars')
- Engagements: Operation Swift Retort

Insignia
- Patch

Aircraft flown
- Fighter: F-16AM/BM Block-15 MLU

The 29 Aggressor squadron is a unit of the Pakistan Air Force which flies F-16s out of Mushaf Airbase. It is the sole squadron which undertakes Aggressor emulation in the air force and is part of the PAF's Airpower Center of Excellence.

== History ==
The 29 Aggressor squadron was formed on 1 January 2019 under the umbrella of Tactics Development School of the Air Power Centre of Excellence (ACE) at CCS Sargodha and commenced flying operations from 23 January 2019. It was established to develop and replicate near realistic Aggressor tactics as well as evaluate counter tactics.

=== Operational history ===
During Operation Swift Retort the squadron's F-16s were deployed on combat air patrols along the Indian border as Mirages from the 15 Squadron bombed Indian military installations in Indian Administered Kashmir. As the events unfolded, an Indian MiG-21 bison was shot down by 29 Squadron F-16s with an AIM-120C5 fired by Squadron Leader Nouman Ali Khan. India claimed that the PAF lost an F-16 Fighting Falcon in the dogfight, leading to a slew of claims and counterclaims by both countries.
