= No. 130 Air Engineering Depot =

- Active: Since 1993
- Country: Pakistan
- Allegiance: Pakistan Air Force
- Branch: Engineering
- Type: MRO Facility
- Role: Overhaul & Maintenance for C-130s
- Part of: Federal Air Command
- Airbase: PAF Base Nur Khan
- Motto(s): خرد نے مجھ کو عطا کی نظر ہکیمانہ

Commanders
- Current commander: Group Captain Azhar Mahmood

The Pakistan Air Force's No. 130 Air Engineering Depot (130th AED) is an MRO facility for Lockheed C-130s located in Rawalpindi at PAF Base Nur Khan.

== History ==
Ever since the induction of the first Lockheed C-130 in the air force in 1963, the PAF could undertake Inspect Repair As Necessary (IRAN) level maintenance for the planes. As major maintenance and repair establishments were not available for the Hercules in Pakistan, PAF had to fly them to aerospace facilities in other countries like Indonesia (PTDI), Singapore (ST Aerospace), Portugal (OGMA), Brazil (Embraer) etc. which would cost $5 Million per aircraft not to mention the prolonged crew & aircraft outstation time. As a result, the No. 130 Air Engineering Depot was established at PAF Base Chaklala in 1993 with a single dock to provide local MRO services to Pakistan's C-130 fleet and lessen foreign dependence. In 2001, No. 130 AED started undertaking Outer Wing Improvement Programs (OWIP) with Messrs aerostructures, Australia also partnering in the later years. The facility also has the capability to undertake Corrosion Prevention Control Program and Aircraft Upholstery Refurbishment.

Over the years the complex has received major upgrades to enhance its capabilities. In 2009, a second PDM hangar was constructed and working docks increased to two in order to boost production. Laser Tracker equipment was acquired in 2010 and departments of Structural Repair Design Office (SRDO) and Configuration Management Cell (CMC) were established in order to provide guidelines for major structure repair with proper record keeping of aircraft configurations. The complex also raised a new Logistics squadron in 2011.

The facility can generally overhaul 6 C-130s per year. As of 2022, the depot has worked on 62 Pakistani C-130s along with 2 C-130s of Nigeria and 2 Sri Lankan C-130Ks.

=== Achievements ===
On 15 March 2017, the Depot held a ceremony to commemorate the roll out of the 50th Periodic Depot Maintenance (PDM) on a C-130. The C-130B nicknamed "The Old Man" by PAF airmen was one of the oldest flying C-130s which was built in 1958.
