= No. 81 Squadron PAF =

Pakistani air force unit

No. 81 Squadron
- Active: Since 1963 (61–62)
- Country: Pakistan
- Allegiance: Pakistan Air Force
- Branch: GD(P)/Flying
- Type: Squadron
- Role: SAR & OCU
- Airbase: PAF Base Peshawar
- Nickname(s): Kangaroos
- Mascot(s): A Kangaroo
- Helicopters: Alouette-III
- Engagements: 2015 Camp Badaber attack; Operation Swift Retort; Rescue Operations; 2010 Peshawar Floods; 2011 Mirpur Khas Floods

Aircraft flown
- Helicopter: Alouette-III

The No. 81 Search & Rescue Squadron nicknamed Kangaroos is a helicopter unit of the Pakistan Air Force. It operates French Alouette-III helicopters providing SAR coverage from PAF Base Peshawar. It also runs the Helicopter Flying Training School (HFTS) where PAF helicopter pilots receive basic training on rotorcrafts.

== History ==
The squadron was raised at its home base at Peshawar in 1963 as a Search and Rescue flight equipped with a few Alouette-IIIs. Its fleet was expanded over the years after which its status was raised to a squadron. Its main role was to maintain SAR coverage to PAF flying operations in and around Peshawar while operating from PAF Camp Badaber and PAF Base Peshawar.

In 1995, the squadron was upgraded to a Helicopter Flying Training School (HFTS) to carry out helicopter conversion courses for PAF pilots while also carrying on with its SAR role. It has since carried out 34 conversion courses which also included special courses for pilots from Saudi Arabia and UAE.

=== Operational history ===
After TTP terrorists launched an attack on PAF Camp Badaber in 2015, the squadron's helicopters took active part in supporting roles. It provided vital aerial reconnaissance and rescue support to ground troops engaged in heavy fighting with the terrorists.

== See also ==
- List of Pakistan Air Force squadrons
