= No. 28 Squadron PAF =

No. 28 Multirole Squadron
- Active: Since 28 February 2018 (7 years, 1 month and 29 days)
- Country: Pakistan
- Allegiance: Pakistan Armed Forces
- Branch: Pakistan Air Force
- Type: Squadron
- Role: Multi-role
- Airbase: PAF Base Samungli
- Motto(s): خودی کو جس نے فلک سے بلند تر دیکھا
- Mascot(s): A Phoenix
- Aircraft: JF-17

Aircraft flown
- Fighter: JF-17A Thunder

The 28 Multi-Role Squadron; (28 MR Squadron) nicknamed Phoenixes is a unit of the Pakistan Air Force operating JF-17 fighter jets. It is based at Samungli airbase in Quetta.

== History ==
The squadron was raised at its home airbase on 28 February 2018 and became the sixth squadron to be equipped with the JF-17 fighters. It was the first JF-17 squadron to be raised in the Baluchistan province hence its historic raising was celebrated with a grand inauguration which was attended by key officials including the PAF Chief, ACM Sohail Aman.

The unit is responsible for providing Day and night cover to Pakistan's western borders with Afghanistan and Iran, particularly to the CPEC projects in Baluchistan.

== Operational history ==
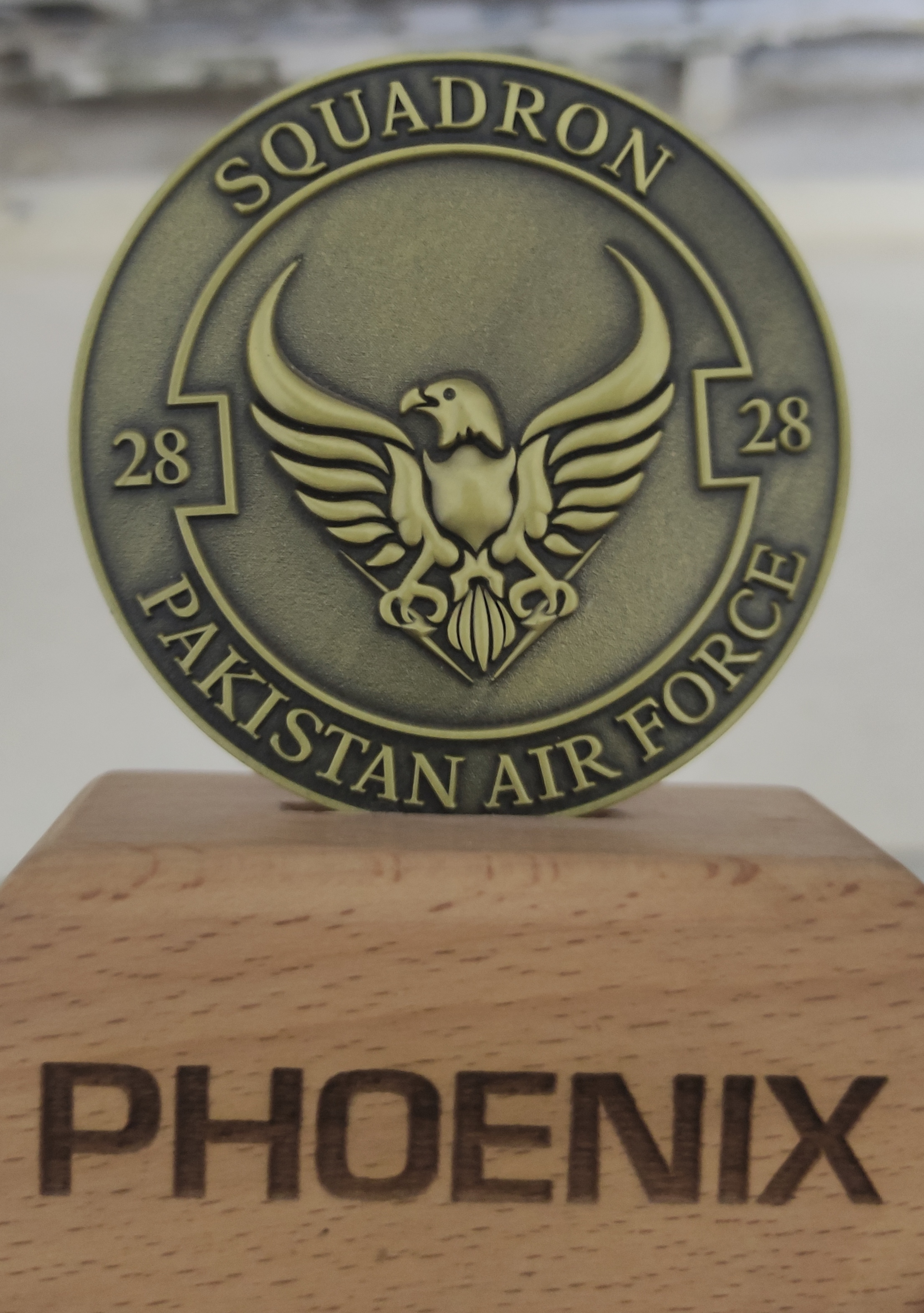
Medallion of the squadron

In 2019, the squadron saw its first oversees deployment at Konya in Turkey for the Anatolian Eagle Exercises.

== See also ==
- List of Pakistan Air Force squadrons
