= Murid, Chakwal =

Murid مرید Mureed
- Village and union council
- Location in Pakistan
- Coordinates: 33.03°N 72.39°E
- Country: Pakistan
- Region: Punjab Province
- District: Chakwal District

Government
  - Chairman: Mian Azhar Hussain

Population
  - Total: 13,000 in 2,017 census including PAF Base
- Time zone: UTC+5 (PST)

Murid or Mureed (Urdu: مريد) is a village and union council in Chakwal District in the Punjab Province of Pakistan. It is located 10 km west of Chakwal and is part of Chakwal Tehsil. It has main Bazar is called "Maidan".

== See also ==
- PAF Base Murid, an air base located there
