= No. 12 Squadron PAF =

Pakistani air force unit

No. 12 VIP Squadron
- Active: since March 1950 (76 years, 8 months and 4 days)
- Disbanded: 1950-1951; 2003-2007
- Country: Pakistan
- Allegiance: President of Pakistan; Prime Minister of Pakistan
- Branch: Pakistan Air Force
- Type: Squadron
- Role: VIP Transport
- Part of: No. 35 Composite Air Transport Wing
- Airbase: PAF Base Nur Khan
- Mottos: اوج ھما (Urdu for 'Ascent of the Huma')
- Mascot: A Buraq
- Engagements: Kashmir conflict

Commanders
- Notable commanders: Polly Shah; Mukhtar Ahmad Dogar

Aircraft flown
- Fighter: Hawker Fury FB.60; Tempest II
- Patrol: SA-16 Albatross
- Reconnaissance: Auster AOP.6
- Transport: Global 6000; Gulfstream G450; Gulfstream IV; Cessna Citation Excel; Fokker F27 Friendship; Boeing 707; Airbus A310; Airbus A319; Dassault DA-20; Hawker Siddeley Trident; Bristol Freighter; Vickers Viscount; Vickers VC.1 Viking; Douglas Dakota; King Air 200; Airbus A320

The No. 12 VIP Squadron nicknamed Burraqs is a VIP transport unit from the No. 35 Composite Air Transport Wing of the Pakistan Air Force based at Nur Khan Airbase. It is the Air Force One of Pakistan which transports the President (Callsign Pakistan-1), the Prime Minister (Callsign Pakistan-2) and the Chief of Air Staff (Callsign Shahbaz-1) during official visits. The squadron currently flies a Airbus A319, a Gulfstream IV, a Global 6000 and a Cessna Citation Excel. Formed as a bomber squadron at Mauripur in 1953, it eventually became a VIP transport squadron, a role which it performs to this day.

== History ==
The roots of the squadron originate from the No. 1 VIP Communications flight of Mauripur airbase which flew the Pakistani founder and acting Governor General Muhammad Ali Jinnah on his country wide tours during the early days of independence in his Vickers Viking-1B and VIP configured Douglas Dakota. The squadron was officially formed in March 1950 as the No. 12 Heavy Bomber Squadron at Mauripur under the command of Squadron Leader AKS Ahmed. The squadron received 8 Halifax bombers (6 Mk. VI & 2 Mk. VIIIs) which were the primary aircraft of the squadron, other than that the Mauripur communications flight along with a couple more flights with aircraft of various types and roles were also made part of the squadron. The unit was the first bomber squadron of the Royal Pakistan Air Force however it remained under-established owing to multiple problems faced after Pakistan's independence which included shortage of manpower, funds and facilities along with maintenance difficulties of its bomber fleet. The squadron was thus subsequently disbanded in August 1950.

The unit was re-raised after being disbanded for one year and resumed normal operations. It saw service in October 1951 after the Indian military started a military build up on the Pakistani borders with subsequent skirmishes with Pakistani troops along the Cease Fire Line in Kashmir. Two of the squadron's Halifaxes which were locally modified for supply drop missions were deployed to provide logistic support to Pakistani troops stationed in mountainous areas subsequently flying airdrop sorties over Bunji, Astor, Burzi, Gilgit, Chilas and Skardu which at the time had little to no road access.

In September 1953, the unit was reformed as the No. 12 Composite Squadron with the renown Squadron Leader Mukhtar Ahmad Dogar as its commanding officer. The same flights with more or less the same aircraft inventory made up the composite squadron. Two VIP configured Bristol Freighters were inducted in early 1954, these had special liveries to make them distinguishable from normal cargo variants which the No. 6 Squadron was operating.

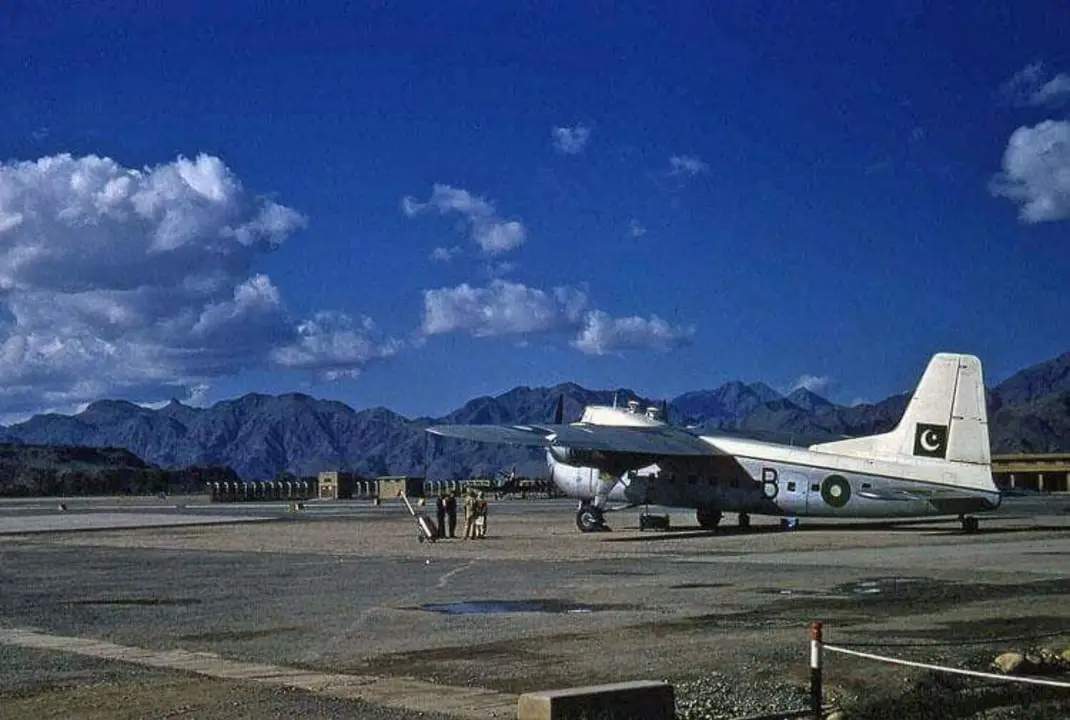
A Bristol Freighter of the No. 12 Squadron parked at PAF Base Kohat painted in the squadron's color scheme of white and silver livery with green colored propeller spinners.

Soon two more Bristol Wayfarers for passenger transport and a paratrooping variant of a Bristol Freighter along with Tempest IIs for target towing were also acquired. In April 1956, the Vickers Viking was put in storage and replaced with a Vickers Viscount. The Viscount though newly purchased developed structural failures but went on to be used for a number of President Ayub Khan's official visits during the Cold War before being grounded. It was eventually gifted to the Chinese in 1968.

In early 1957, a Search and Rescue flight equipped with newly inducted Grumman HU-16 Albatross hydroplanes was made part of the squadron which remained part of the 12 Squadron for 2 years. In 1959, the rescue flight became the No. 4 Squadron after receiving more aircraft.

On 9 July 1960, the PAF's Air Transport Element comprising Nos. 3, 6 and 12 Squadrons was shifted to Chaklala airbase where it remains to this day. Shortly after, a Fokker F-27 was inducted for medium ranged official visits which was a popular airliner with the PIA at the time. In 1972, the Prime Minister at the time Zulfiqar Ali Bhutto requested the PAF for a private jet for his official tours. After thorough studies by AHQ, a Dassault Falcon 20 was purchased for the official tours.

In 1986, two Boeing 707s were operationalized, a cargo variant and a VIP version (J-635). During the same year, an Antonov AN-26 transported which had defected to Pakistan was pressed into service. It served the unit for some time till lack of spares forced it to be grounded and put on display at the PAF Museum in Karachi. A Boeing 737 which was leased from the PIA was also put to service in 1994 and flew President Farooq Leghari on various tours before being reverted to PAI service. The Fokker F-27 (J-752) was transferred to the Navy on 25 August 2008 after flying more than 50,000 hours with the squadron, similarly the Dassault Falcon 20 (J-753) was also transferred to the 24 EW Squadron where it was converted into an Electronic-warfare aircraft.

By the end of 2007, the vintage Boeing 707s were retired and replaced with a Gulfstream 450 (J-756) long range VIP jet. In October 2009, an Airbus A310 (J-757) was purchased though it was later handed over to the PIA after a short service with the PAF.

As of 2025, the squadron functions as the Presidential transport unit for the Government of Pakistan flying a A319, a GIV, a Global 6000 and a Citation Excel.

As of 2026, one of the three Embraer Lineage 1000 of Pakistan Navy, has been temporarily transferred to the PAF for VIP transport, while the other two are being modified for maritime patrol roles.

== Accidents and incidents ==
1. In August 1951, a Halifax of the squadron performed a belly landing at Risalpur Airbase after a landing gear malfunction. The crew, which consisted of the Captain (Flight Lieutenant SM Ahmed), Co-Pilot (Flying Officer Majeed Beg) and Flight engineer (Flying Officer M Rehan), had spent three hours attempting to lower the stuck wheel without any success. The belly landing caused a fracture in the fuselage which led to it being written off with the crew surviving the ordeal.
2. On 17 August 1988, a VIP configured C-130B of the squadron which was carrying President Zia ul Haq and other important dignitaries crashed while on its way to Chaklala from Bahawalpur.
3. On 7 November 1995, the squadron's Boeing 707 carrying President Farooq Leghari made an emergency landing at Darwin International Airport after engine no. 3 caught fire shortly after take-off. The captain; Wing Commander Kamal, landed the aircraft safely back at Darwin.
4. On 20 February 2003, one of the squadron's two Fokker F-27 which was carrying then Chief of Air Staff ACM Mushaf Ali Mir crashed into a mountain while en route to Kohat from Chaklala.

== See also ==
- Air transports of heads of state and government
- List of Pakistan Air Force squadrons
