= PAF Base Samungli =

Air Base in Balochistan province of Pakistan

PAF Base Samungli
- پی اے ایف بیس سمنگلی
- Quetta, Balochistan in Pakistan
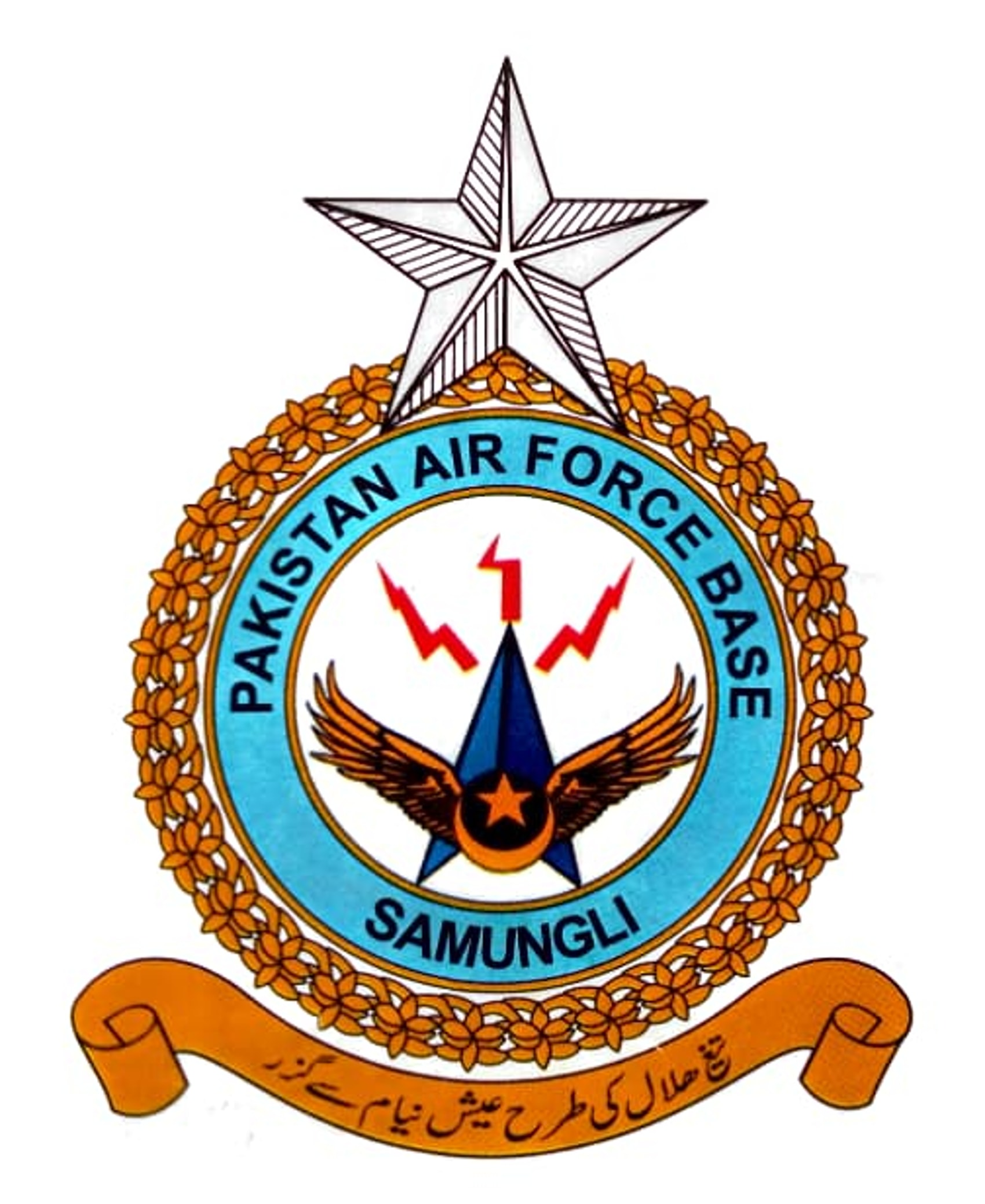

Site information
- Type: Military airbase
- Owner: Ministry of Defense
- Operator: Pakistan Air Force
- Controlled by: Southern Air Command

Location
- Shown within Balochistan PAF Base Samungli (Pakistan)
- Coordinates: 30°14′35″N 66°56′37″E

Site history
- Built: 1944
- Built by: British Raj
- In use: 1944 - present
- Battles/wars: World War II

Garrison information
- Current commander: Air Commodore Nasir Jamal Khattak
- Occupants: 28 Squadron "Phoenixes"; 85 Squadron "Saviours"

Airfield information
- Identifiers: IATA: SMG, ICAO: OPQT
- Elevation: 1,605 metres (5,266 ft) AMSL
Runways
Direction	Length and surface
13/31	3,658 metres (12,001 ft) Asphalt
13R/31L	3,648 metres (11,969 ft) Asphalt

Pakistan Air Force Base Samungli or more simply PAF Base Samungli (Urdu: پی اے ایف بیس سمنگلی) is a Pakistan Air Force (PAF) airbase located adjacent to Quetta International Airport, in the Balochistan province of Pakistan. Originally used as a forward operating location during exercises and wartime, it was converted into a main operating base during the 1970s. Samungli currently houses one PAF squadron flying the CAC/PAC JF-17 Thunder combat aircraft.

== History ==
The base was used by No. 84 Squadron Royal Air Force between 22 July and 31 October 1944 with the Vultee Vengeance III.

During the years of the Royal Pakistan Air Force (RPAF), the base was known as RPAF Station Samungli. The base was commanded by Major Sikandar Khan of the Pakistan Army from 14 May to 12 July 1954. Squadron Leader K. M. Akbar of the RPAF took over as base commander and commanded a newly established GC Wing.

In June 1957 an annual training camp, Shaheen Air Training Corps (SATC), was inaugurated, commanded by Squadron Leader J. Z. Mikulski who was assisted by Flying Officer A. Hanif and Sergeants Sabir, Zahoor and Hussain. That month saw the SATC wings from Dacca, Sargodha, Drigh Road and Chaklala participating in the training camp. Wings from Lahore and Peshawar followed them in July.

In October 1970 the Care and Maintenance (C&M) Party Samungli was redesignated as PAF Base Samungli and it was proposed that two squadrons would be based there by 1974.

From 1970 to 1978 the base saw fighter squadrons from Masroor, Sargodha and Peshawar deploying during summertime for several weeks. College students were invited to annual summer camps. Firepower and close air support demonstrations were held each summer for Quetta Staff College students by various PAF squadrons, the biggest in September 1976 by No. 5, 7, 11, 15 and 18 Squadrons. The tradition continues today although mostly by the squadrons now based at Samungli.

PAF Base Samungli was converted from a satellite base to a main operating base on 31 March 1978, after which the No. 23 Squadron was permanently deployed there. Later the No. 17 Squadron was also based at Samungli and the two squadrons were assigned to the No. 31 Wing established in May 1983. The setting up of air defence units began in 1981 after HQ No. 4 Sector and its component units was moved nearby due to the Soviet-Afghan war.

Originally the officers' mess was in a small hut-type building. The SNCO's mess and airmen's mess were in a World War II era barracks. These were replaced by the end of 1981 when new messes, domestic accommodation and a 20-bed hospital were built.

On 26 May 1981 an Afghan Air Force Mil Mi-8 helicopter was hijacked from Qandahar and landed at Samungli. On 15 May 1982 the base held a colour presentation ceremony for the No. 23 Squadron after the unit was officially reassigned an air superiority role.

The base has been used by the United States for military logistical operations in support of the 2001 American Invasion of Afghanistan. According to an anonymous source speaking to the Bureau of Investigative Journalism in 2011, the Pentagon is able to make use of the base "as and when".

== See also ==
- List of Pakistan Air Force bases
