= No. 6 Squadron PAF =

Pakistani air force unit

No. 6 Squadron Antelopes
- Active: Since 1 December 1942; 83 years ago
- Country: Pakistan (since 1947)
- Allegiance: British Raj (1942-47)
- Branch: Pakistan Air Force
- Role: Airlift
- Part of: Northern Air Command: No. 35 Composite Air Transport Wing
- Airbase: PAF Base Nur Khan
- Nickname: Antelopes
- Mottos: ميری رسائ سے باہر نہيں کؤی منزل (Urdu for 'No destination is beyond my reach.')
- Mascot: Antelope
- Anniversaries: 1 December 1942
- Aircraft: C-130 Hercules; CN-235 CASA
- Engagements: World War II; Burma Campaign; India–Pakistan wars and conflicts; India–Pakistan war of 1947–1948; India–Pakistan war of 1965; 1965 Air War; India–Pakistan war of 1971; 2025 India–Pakistan conflict; War on terror; Operation Black Thunderstorm; Operation Rah-e-Rast; Operation Rah-e-Nijat; Operation Zarb e Azb; Flood relief operations; 2010 Pakistan floods; 2022 Pakistan floods
- Decorations: 4× Sitara-e-Jurat; 2× Tamgha-i-Jurat; 1× Imtiazi Sanad

Commanders
- Notable commanders: Mehar Singh; Hrushikesh Moolgavkar; B. K. Dass; Eric G. Hall; Michael John O'Brian; Mukhtar Ahmad Dogar; Nazir Latif

Aircraft flown
- Fighter: Hawker Hurricane Mk.II; Supermarine Spitfire
- Transport: Douglas Dakota; Bristol Freighter; C-130 Hercules; CN-235 CASA

No. 6 Squadron, nicknamed the Antelopes, is a transport squadron of the Pakistan Air Force. It is the PAF's oldest squadron which is currently based at Nur Khan Air Base and operates the C-130 & CN-235 transport aircraft.

== History ==
=== Operational history ===
==== Second World War ====
The Squadron's Hawker Hurricanes were deployed for operations at British Burma during fighting with Japanese forces.

==== 1st Kashmir War ====
During the 1947 war, the squadron carried out regular supply drops in Azad Kashmir for troops and villages that had been cut off by snow. Dakota pilots had to fly between the region's mountains, because their fully loaded aircraft had a ceiling of around 10,000ft, while the surrounding mountain peaks were 16,000–20,000ft high. In November 1948 the squadron dropped 40,000kg of supplies while operating from Risalpur and Peshawar. On 4 November 1948, a Dakota was attacked by two Hawker Tempest fighters of the Indian Air Force, but Flying Officer Mukhtar Dogar managed to evade the fighters.

The RPAF purchased a large number of Bristol Freighter transports for No. 6 Squadron in early 1950. The Freighter's fuel capacity enabled the squadron to fly longer transport and communication sorties. Some of the Freighters were modified in 1955 to carry a 1,800 kg "block-buster" bomb under each wing, and limited training in night bombing was undertaken. Similar operations occurred later with the C-130 Hercules. Freighters would be used in varying climatic and geographical conditions, such as the snowbound mountains in Kashmir, the southern Punjabi deserts, and East Pakistan's tropical forests. The 1952 floods led to the unit's deployment for large-scale food supply drops, for which the squadron received an award on 17 August 1952, from the Governor of the Punjab. "Operation Snow Drop" began on 15 November 1953, and involved dropping supplies in Pakistan's Northern Areas from PAF Base Chaklala. From 15 to 30 November 1953, the Antelopes flew 780 hours and dropped 363,000kg of supplies. Replacement of the Bristol Freighter began in 1963 with the delivery of four Lockheed C-130B Hercules transports, which enabled the squadron to fly over the Karakoram mountains rather than between them, thus improving flight safety.

==== India–Pakistan war of 1965 ====
In the India–Pakistan war of 1965 the Antelopes dropped parachute commandos into Indian territory in a night-time mission involving three C-130B transports. Just before the 1965 war started, the squadron's commanding officer, Wing Commander Eric Gordan Hall, had the idea of making up for the PAF's deficiency in heavy bombers by modifying the Hercules to carry bombs. It was converted to carry 10,000 kg of bombs, which were rolled out on pallets from the rear ramp, and over 21 night-time bombing raids were flown against Indian forces approaching for the Battles of Chawinda and Pul Kanjari. Support missions for troops in the Northern Areas were continued after the war.

==== War on terror ====
The squadron participated extensively during Operation Zarb e Azb.

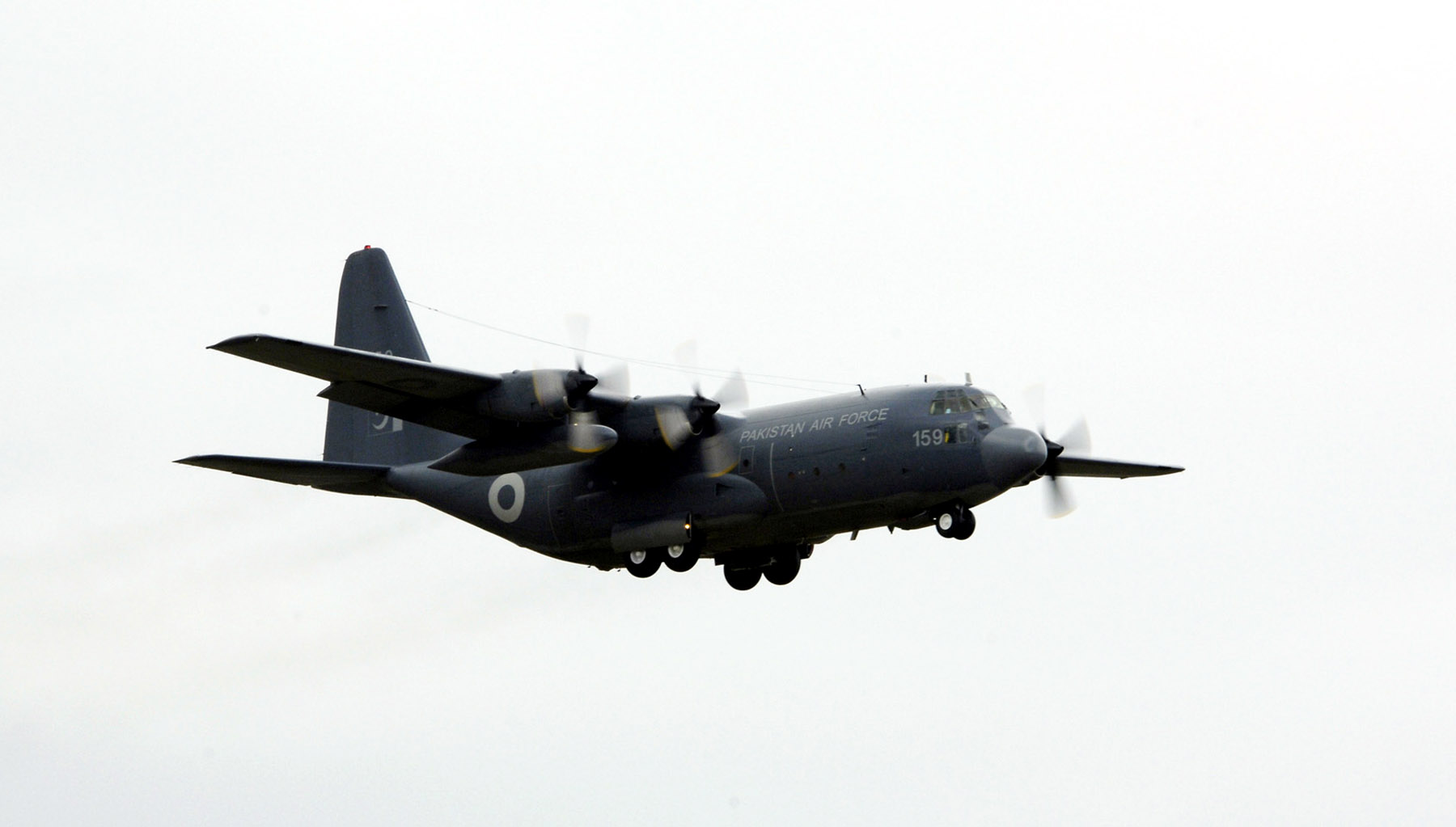
No. 6 Squadron Globe Trotter C-130 flies over McChord Air Force Base, United States.

==== 2025 India–Pakistan conflict ====
During the 2025 India–Pakistan conflict, the Indian Air Force carried out precision cruise missile airstrikes on several key military targets in Pakistan which included technical infrastructure, command and control centres, radar sites and weapon storage areas.

On 10 May, the Indian Air Force carried out airstrikes on the Nur Khan Airbase, targeting runways and military infrastructure. According to Indian defense officials, the operation was intended as a "calibrated response" to cross-border attacks. According to an eye-witness and two Pakistani security officials, the attack on Nur Khan airbase saw at least two missile strikes as well as drone attacks. Pakistan’s military stated that its air defense systems intercepted most of the incoming missiles, and no critical assets were lost. However, according to a Reuters citing an official who visited the base the next day, the barrage hit two roofs and hit the hangar of a refueling plane. According to William Goodhind, a geospatial analyst at Contested Ground, two mobile control centers at the Nur Khan airbase were damaged. Further The Washington Post, also reported videos recorded from a parking lot nearby which "showed smoke billowing from the damaged area". According to Air Forces Monthly, the missiles struck the operations room of the 35th Composite Transport Wing, destroying two fuel trucks and collaterally damaging one Lockheed C-130 Hercules of the No. 6 Squadron PAF at the aforementioned hangar.

== Royal International Air Tattoo ==
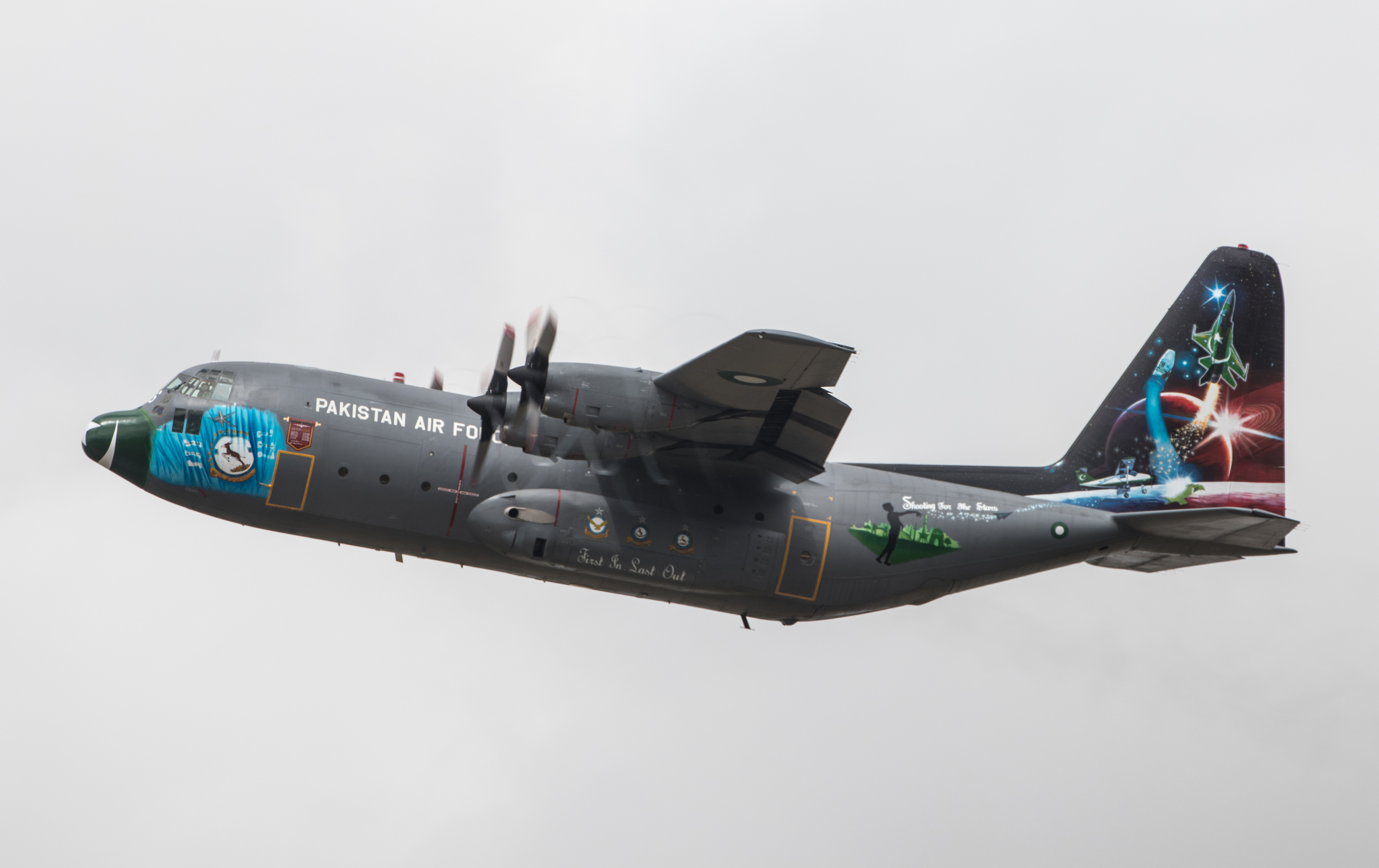
Antelope C-130 taking of during RIAT

The No. 6 Squadron has participated in the British RIAT on various occasions.

== Aircraft Flown ==
Aircraft	From	To	Air Base
Pre-Independence (1942–47)
Hurricane IIB	1 December 1942	June 1946	Trichinopoly
Spitfire XIVe	June 1946	April 1947	Ranchi
Douglas C-47 Skytrain	April 1947	August 1947	Karachi

No. 6 Squadron Antelopes
Role	Operational	Aircraft
Transport	1947—1950	C-47
Transport	1950—1963	Bristol Freighter
Transport	1963—Present	C-130 Hercules

== Gallery ==
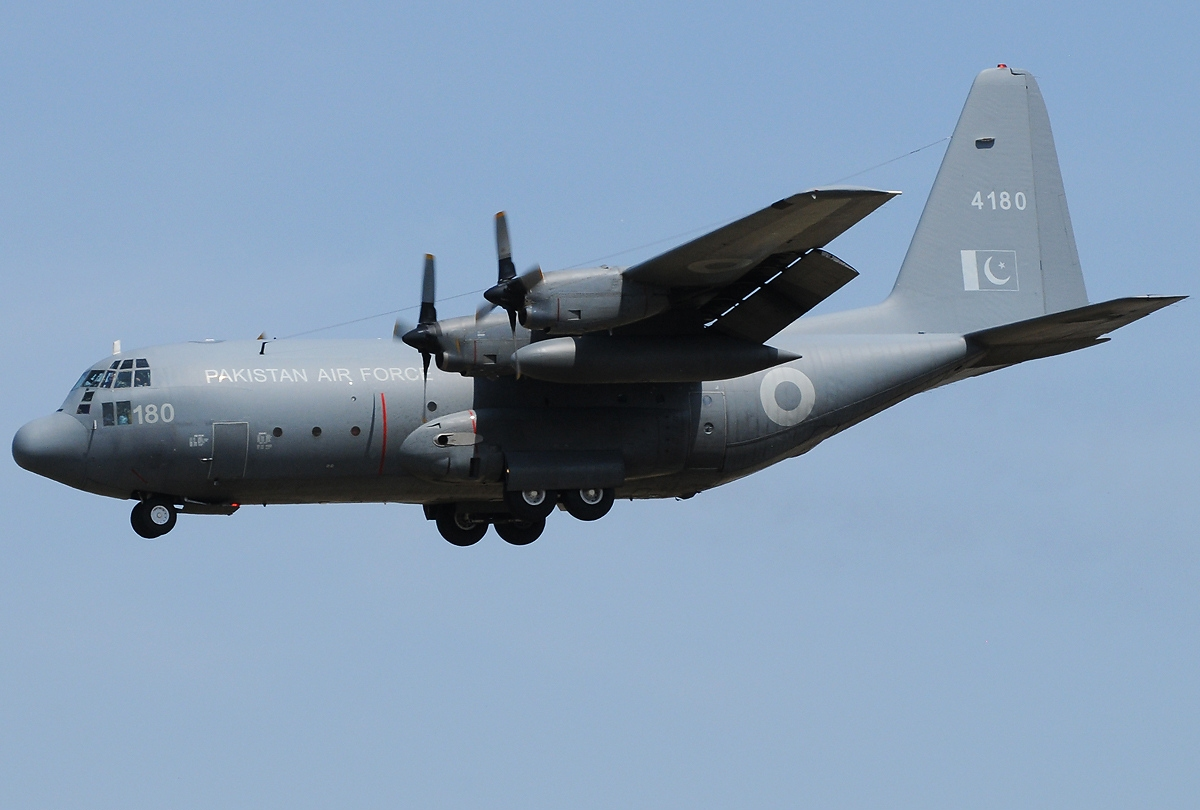
Lockheed C-130E Hercules, Pakistan Air Force

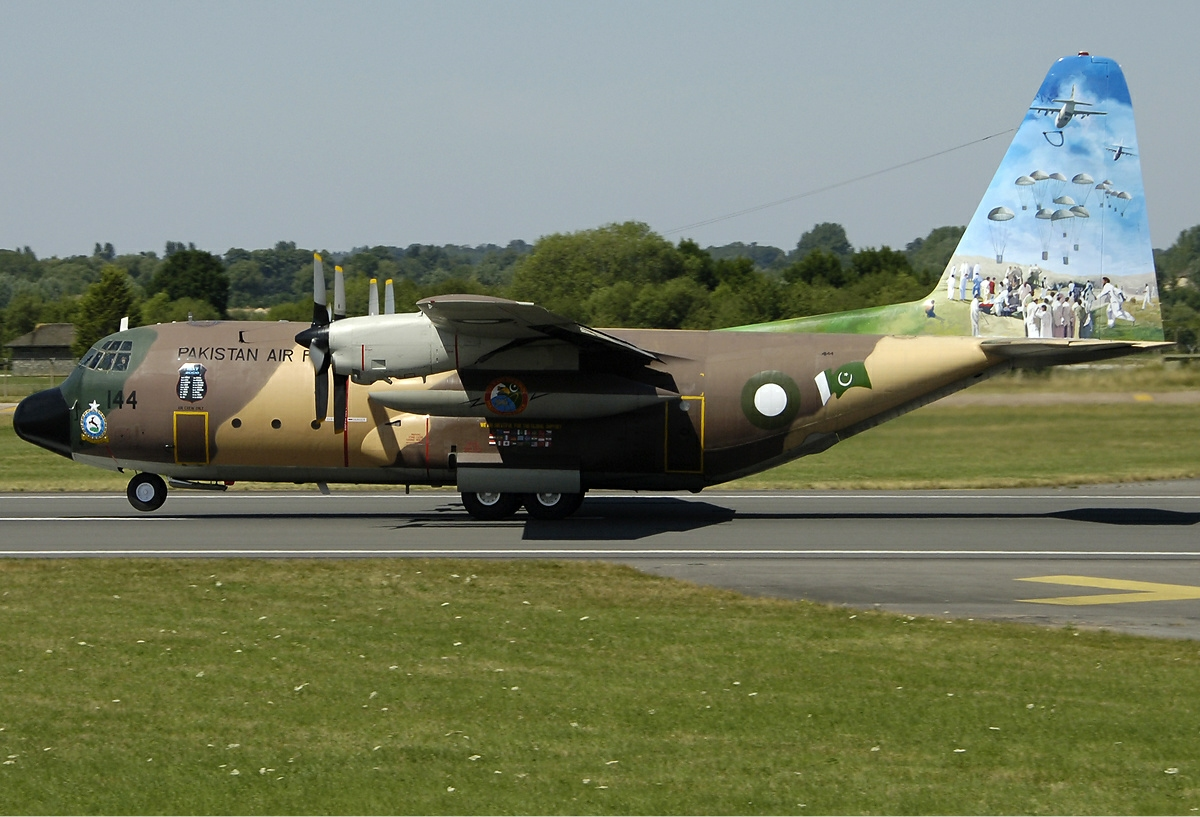
Pakistan Air Force Lockheed C-130E Hercules (L-382) Bidini

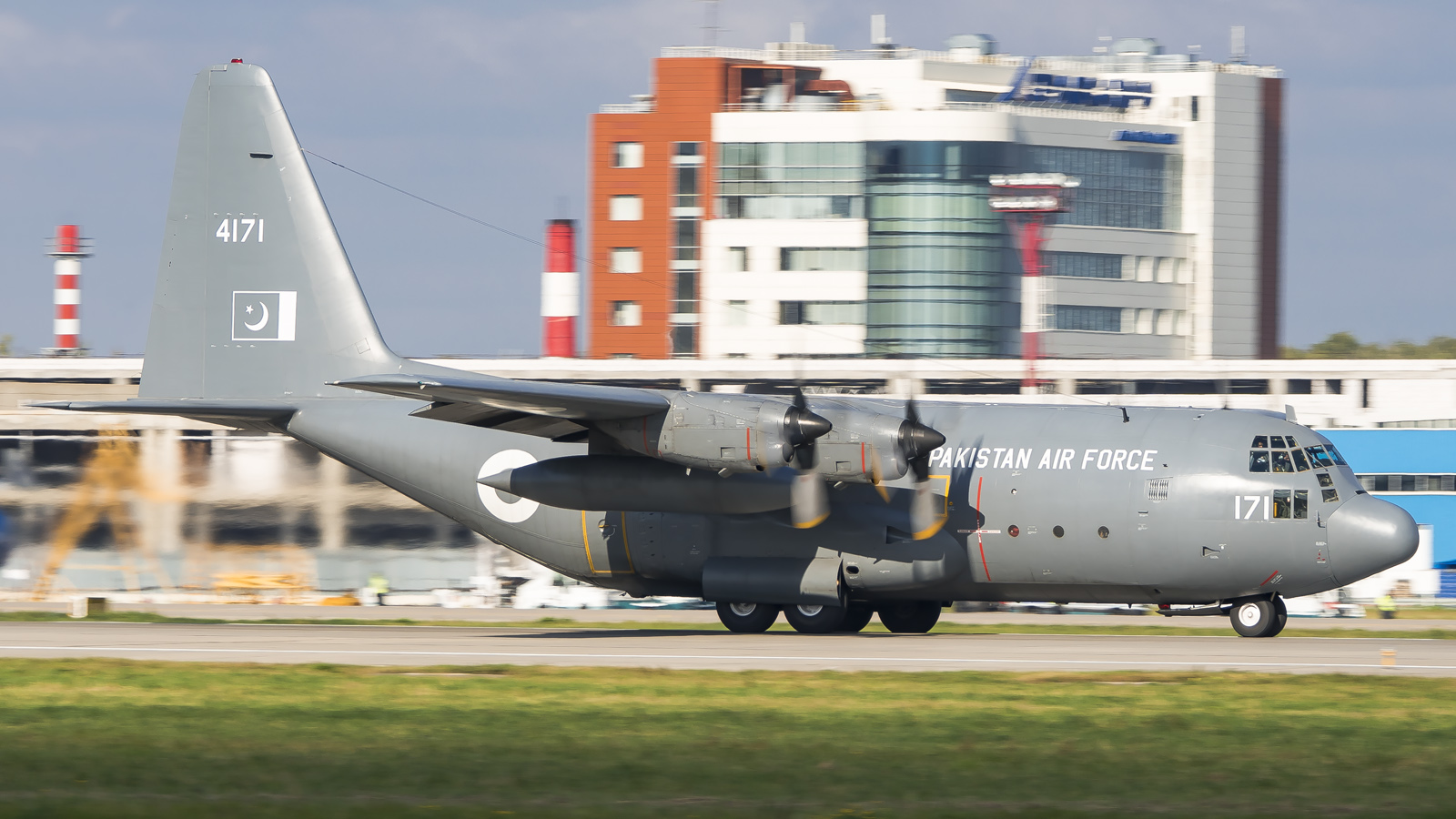
4171 C130(E) Pakistan Air Force

== See also ==
- List of Pakistan Air Force squadrons
