= PAF Base Malir =

Non-flying Pakistan Air Force Base

- IATA: none; ICAO: none

Summary
- Airport type: Military
- Operator: Pakistan Air Force
- Location: Malir, Karachi, Pakistan
- Built: 1942

PAF (Pakistan Air Force) Base Malir is a non-flying Pakistan Air Force Base. The Malir base was originally built by the British Raj during the World War II as the last line of defense against the Wehrmacht. After the war, it was used as the processing area for the returning American soldiers. After being abandoned, Malir base was again brought to use to train the technicians working in the domain of radio and radar for Pakistan Air Force and was upgraded to a station status in 1949.

In current times, the base plays the role of maintaining the Air Defence & lodger units prepared for any wartime situations. Malir base was reported to efficiently provide support during Indo-Pakistani War of 1965 and Indo-Pakistani War of 1971 wars with India.

During 2025 India-Pakistan conflict, the Malir base was one of the bases targeted by the Indian Air Force. The Indian attack had "provoked a military counter-attack from Pakistan; waves of drones and missiles were fired at military establishments" in India and Indian-administered Kashmir.
