= PAF Base Faisal =

Military airbase in Karachi, Pakistan

PAF Base Faisal
- Shahrah-e-Faisal, Karachi in Pakistan
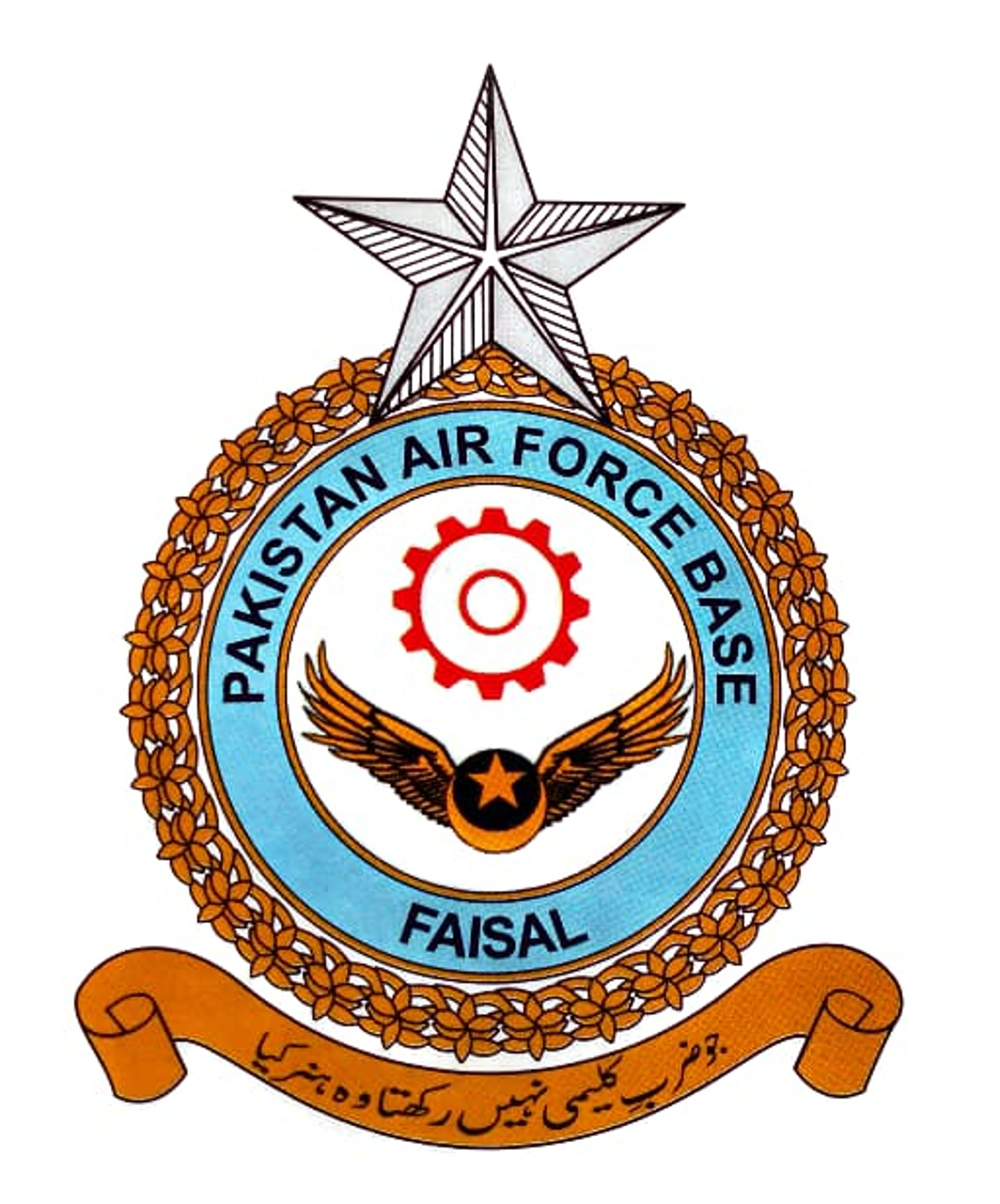

Site information
- Type: Military airbase
- Owner: Ministry of Defense
- Operator: Pakistan Air Force
- Controlled by: Southern Air Command

Location
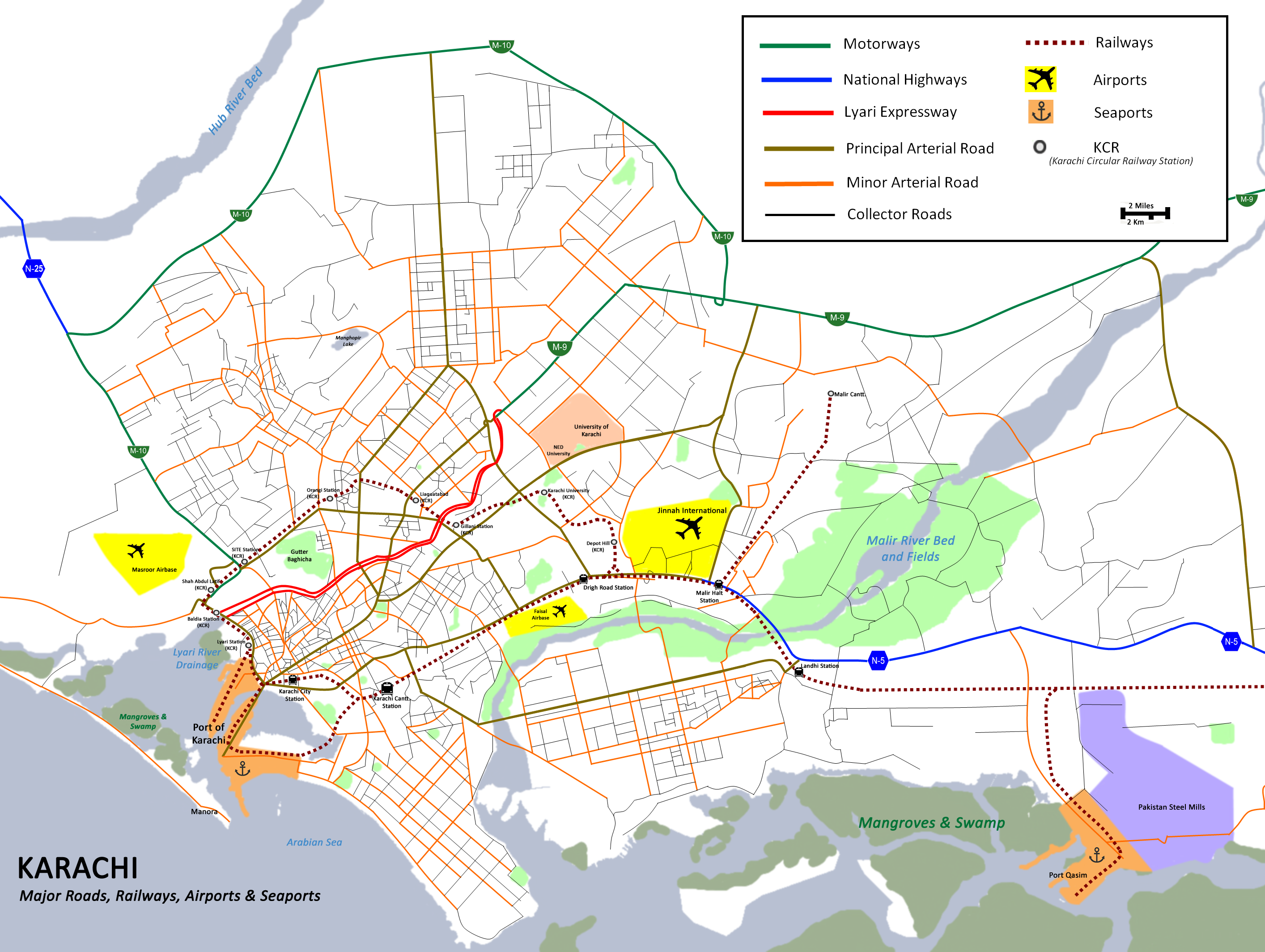
- Shown within Karachi PAF Base Faisal (Pakistan)
- Coordinates: 24°52′42″N 67°6′56″E

Site history
- Built: 1933
- In use: 1933 - present

Garrison information
- Current commander: Air Commodore Shafique Ahmad
- Occupants: No. 21 Squadron "Burraqs"

Airfield information
- Identifiers: IATA: FSL, ICAO: OPSF
- Elevation: 8 metres (26 ft) AMSL
Runways
Direction	Length and surface
08/26	2,455 metres (8,054 ft) Asphalt

Pakistan Air Force Base Faisal (Urdu: پی اے ایف بیس فیصل), founded as RAF Drigh Road, previously known as PAF Station Drigh Road, and now called Shahrah-e-Faisal, is located in Karachi, Sindh, Pakistan. In 1975, it was named after the late King Faisal of Saudi Arabia.

It is the site of PAF's Southern Air Command HQ and PAF Air War College.

== History ==
Royal Air Force activities began at what was then known as Drigh Road in 1933, during the British Raj. It was the first air force station in British India and was the birthplace of the colonial-era Royal Indian Air Force, the PAF's parent force. The runways were surfaced in 1944. The Royal Air Force strikes of 1946 was a mutiny on dozens of Royal Air Force stations in British India in January 1946. The mutiny began at RAF Drigh Road, and later spread to involve nearly 50,000 men over 60 RAF stations in British India and RAF bases as far as Singapore. In 1947, control of RAF Drigh Road was transferred to the Pakistan Air Force and began serving as a supply depot.

The following Royal Air Force squadrons were here at some point:

- No. 5 Squadron RAF detachment initially between December 1928 and May 1933 with the Westland Wapiti then as cadre between 9 June and 1 August 1935
- No. 28 Squadron RAF detachment between March 1939 and January 1942 with the Hawker Audax and Westland Lysander II
- No. 31 Squadron RAF initially as a cadre then a full squadron between 8 June 1935 and 27 October 1938 with the Wapiti. It returned on 26 March 1941 with the Douglas DC-2 until September 1941
- No. 60 Squadron RAF detachment between May 1925 and September 1940 with the Wapiti then the Bristol Blenheim I
- No. 84 Squadron RAF between 18 March and 3 June 1942
- No. 159 Squadron RAF detachment between July 1944 and June 1945 with the Consolidated Liberator V
- No. 160 Squadron RAF ground echelon between 4 and 17 June 1942
- No. 354 Squadron RAF between 10 May and 17 August 1943
- No. 1 Squadron IAF formed here on 1 April 1933

PAF Base Masroor is the other Pakistan Air Force base in Karachi. The new PAF Base Bholari near Karachi was inaugurated in January 2018.

== Recent developments ==
PAF Base Faisal is currently the home of the PAF Air War College, preparing Pakistan Air Force junior officers who have already been marked for promotion for command and staff duties at the operational level. One of the facilities at PAF Base Faisal, the 102 Air Engineering depot, is responsible for the overhaul of turbojet engines for the PAF's fleet of Chengdu F-7. The F-7 is a type of Chinese interceptor aircraft. On 4 July 2003 a ceremony was held to celebrate the roll-out of the 10,000th turbojet engine to be overhauled at the facility.

The engine overhaul workshop was also upgraded to overhaul the newer WP-13F turbojet engines of the PAF's latest F-7 model, the F-7PG.

== See also ==
- List of Pakistan Air Force bases
- List of airports in Pakistan
- PAF Base Masroor
- PNS Mehran
