= PAF Base Murid =

Operational flying base of the Pakistan Air Force

PAF Base Murid
- Murid, Chakwal District in Pakistan

Site information
- Type: Air base
- Code: PK-0009
- Owner: Ministry of Defence
- Operator: Pakistan Air Force
- Controlled by: Northern Air Command
- Condition: Operational

Location
- Shown within Punjab, Pakistan PAF Base Murid (Pakistan)
- Coordinates: 32°54′36″N 72°46′26″E

Site history
- Built: 1942 & 2013
- Built by: British Raj & Pakistan Air Force
- In use: 1942 – present
- Battles/wars: 2025 India–Pakistan standoff; Operation Bunyanun Marsoos

Garrison information
- Garrison: 42 Flying Wing

Airfield information
- Elevation: 540 metres (1,772 ft) AMSL
Runways
Direction	Length and surface
14/32	3,584.4 metres (11,760 ft) Asphalt
- Source: Scramble.nl

Pakistan Air Force Base Murid or more simply PAF Base Murid (Urdu: پی اے ایف بیس مرید) is an operational flying base of the Pakistan Air Force located near the village of Murid in the Chakwal District of Punjab. It houses the UCAV and UAV fleet of the Pakistan Air Force.

== History ==
The airfield was established by the British in 1942 as an RIAF Air Station. After Pakistan gained independence in 1947, the airfield was renamed as the No. 784 Readiness Flight and served as a Forward operating base for the PAF.

Gradually, the airfield was installed with Airfield Lightening Systems (AFLS) and PAR systems. In 2013, the airfield was re-structured and subsequently named PAF Base Murid with its operational status being upgraded to Main operating base in December 2014. As the PAF's drone fleet expands, the No. 42 Flying Wing has been established at the base with major infrastructure plans to transform the base. 8 hangars constructed to house various kinds of combat drones. 3 were under construction.

=== 2025 Indian airstrikes ===
Amidst the 2025 India–Pakistan conflict, Murid airbase was amongst 11 air bases that were targeted with missile attacks by the Indian Air Force during the midnight hours of 10 May 2025. The Pakistan Armed Forces claimed that their air defense systems had intercepted the incoming Indian missiles and reported all assets at the base safe and operational.

Satellite imagery released by Indian MEA showed a nearly 3-metre-wide crater just 30 metres from the entrance of a heavily fortified sub-complex within the Murid air base. The crater's proximity to what is believed to be an underground structure raised speculation that India aimed to strike deep-buried assets, possibly linked to command-and-control functions or drone operations.

On 2 June 2025, satellite images provided by Maxar Technologies indicated that a green tarpaulin was hiding what appeared to be repair work on a command and control centre that was struck on 10 May.Further imagery revealed that the structure was demolished for reconstruction works by March 2026.

== Units ==
Various UAV and UCAV squadrons of the 42 Flying Wing operate out of Murid Airbase.

- No. 60 Strategic Squadron — Operates Shahpar-1 UAVs
- No. 61 Strategic Squadron — Formerly operated 5 NESCOM Burraqs. Currently undergoing training on Shahpar-I.
- No. 64 CUAS Squadron — Operates Bayraktar TB2 UCAVs.
- No. 65 MR UAS Squadron — Operates Baykar Bayraktar Akıncı HALE UCAVs.

== See also ==
- List of Pakistan Air Force bases
