= No. 15 Squadron PAF =

No. 15 Squadron Cobras
- Active: 5 June 1956 – present
- Country: Pakistan
- Allegiance: Pakistan Armed Forces
- Branch: Pakistan Air Force
- Type: Squadron
- Role: Tactical Attack
- Airbase: PAF Base Minhas
- Nickname: Cobras
- Mottos: اژدر شعلہ فشاں (Urdu for 'Fire spitting cobras')
- Mascot: A Cobra
- Aircraft: Chengdu J-10C
- Engagements: Indo-Pakistani conflicts; 1959 Canberra shootdown; Indo-Pakistani War of 1965; Operation Swift Retort; 2025 India–Pakistan conflict; War on terror; KPK Insurgency; Operation Khwakh Ba De Sham; Spillover of Soviet - Afghan war in Pakistan

Commanders
- Current commander: Wing Commander Imtiaz Rahim Shehzada

Insignia
- Patch

- Patch for Zilzal-II (Note: Air exercise in Qatar in 2024)

Aircraft flown
- Attack: Dassault Mirage VPA
- Fighter: North American F-86F Sabre; Shenyang F-6; Chengdu J-10
- Interceptor: Chengdu F-7P
- Reconnaissance: Dassault Mirage-IIIRP; Dassault Mirage-VDR
- Trainer: Lockheed T-33; Dassault Mirage-IIIDA

The No. 15 Squadron, nicknamed Cobras, is a tactical attack squadron of the Pakistan Air Force (PAF). The Squadron is currently based at PAF Base Minhas in Kamra, Punjab, Pakistan and equipped with Chengdu J-10C multirole fighter jets. The Squadron also carries the honour of achieving the first kill for the PAF.

== History ==
No. 15 Squadron was established on 5 June 1956 at PAF Base Mauripur as a tactical attack squadron.

=== Operational history ===
==== 1959 Indian aerial intrusion ====
On 10 April 1959, while most of Pakistan was celebrating the holy day of Eid ul-Fitr, an Indian Canberra B(I)58 from the 106 Squadron entered Pakistani airspace on a photo reconnaissance mission. Two PAF F-86F Sabres (flown by Flt. Lt. M. N. Butt as the leader and Flt. Lt. M. Yunis as the wingman) from the No. 15 Squadron on Air Defence Alert were scrambled from PAF Base Peshawar to intercept the IAF aircraft. Butt attempted to bring down the Canberra by firing his Sabre's 50 cal machine guns, but the Canberra was flying at an altitude of more than 50,000 feet—beyond the operational ceiling of the F-86F. When Yunis took over from his leader, the Canberra suddenly lost height while executing a turn over Rawalpindi. Yunis then fired a burst from his F-86 (Serial# 55-005) machine guns that struck the Canberra at an altitude of 47,500 feet and brought it down over Rawat, marking the first aerial victory of the PAF. Both crew members of the IAF Canberra ejected and were captured by Pakistani authorities.

==== 1965 War ====
When hostilities broke out over the disputed Kashmir region, the No. 15 Squadron while equipped with F-86 Sabre jet fighters was deployed at PAF Base Sargodha. From there the squadron performed various combat missions including Close Air Support sorties. On 1 September, the IAF scrambled 12 De Havilland Vampire strike fighters and 14 Dassault Mystere IV fighter-bombers in an attempt to slow down the Pakistani Advance in the Chamb-Jourian sector. On the request of the Pakistan Army, two F-86 Sabres, each armed with a couple of AIM-9 Sidewinder missiles were scrambled to intercept the Indian aircraft. In the ensuing dogfight, Flight Lieutenant Imtiaz Bhatti from the No. 15 Squadron shot down two Indian Vampires over Chumb while Squadron Leader Sarfaraz Rafiqui from the No. 5 Squadron shot down another two Vampires. The remaining Indian aircraft managed to escape. This dogfight was a major blow to the Indian Air Force since it had to recall all Vampires and Mysteres from frontline service.

==== Soviet-Afghan War ====
During the Soviet Afghan war, Soviet and Afghan warplanes would occasionally cross into Pakistani airspace while pursuing Afghan Mujahideen forces which usually resulted in Pakistani infrastructure and Afghan refugee camps getting bombed. Resultantly, the squadron was deployed at Peshawar Airbase for Air Defence Alert duties. Throughout its service at Peshawar, the Squadron's fighters intercepted enemy warplanes only twice. First a Soviet Ilyushin Il-26 on 1 March 1980 and on the second occasion, its fighters intercepted a couple of Mig-21s in February 1986. However, on both occasions the Squadron's pilots were ordered not to engage them.

==== 2019 Jammu and Kashmir airstrikes ====
In February 2019, the Indian Air Force allegedly bombed a terrorist camp in Balakot. Open source satellite imagery revealed that no targets of consequence were hit. The following day, Pakistan shot down an Indian warplane and took its pilot, Abhinandan Varthaman, prisoner. The retaliatory airstrikes were codenamed "Operation Swift Retort" and for this purpose Two Dassault Mirage-VPAs armed with H-4 SOW Glide bombs and two dual seat Dassault Mirage-IIIDAs from the No. 15 Squadron were deployed for this mission. In the early hours of 27 February, the No. 15 Squadron carried out the airstrikes while JF-17s and F-16s from other squadrons provided escort and CAP. The Mirage-VPAs dropped their payload while the Weapon Systems Officer seated in the Mirage-IIIDAs guided the bombs to their respective targets, but changed the targets at the last moment, establishing dominance through warning to the enemy; the success of which could be gauged by the fact that India could not move up the escalation ladder and backed down.

2025 India-Pakistan conflict

After Pahalgam incident in April, on 6–7 May night Operation Sindoor started by Indian Airforce by striking in Pakistan which triggered an aerial battle in which more than 114 aircraft, 72 from the IAF and 42 from the PAF, were involved in what was described as the largest beyond visual range engagement on the India–Pakistan border, with the engagement described as one of the largest air battles since the end of World War II. According to independent assessments, at least four Indian fighter aircraft were downed during the dogfight, though Pakistan claimed five, including three Rafales, one MiG-29, one SU-30MKI and a Heron unmanned aerial vehicle. It is first time that a French-origin Dassault Rafale has been lost in combat, reportedly having been shot down by the Chinese-origin Chengdu J-10. Pakistan's response also included the use of Chinese-produced PL-15 long-range air-to-air missiles fired from Chengdu J-10 fighter jets, marking the first combat use of the missile.

On 15 May, Pakistani prime minister Shehbaz Sharif claimed that Pakistan shot down six Indian fighter jets, the sixth being a Mirage 2000. On 28 May, he again said that six Indian fighter jets were downed but said that four of these were Rafale, one MiG-29 and one "another plane". The PAF provided the tail numbers BS001, BS021, BS022, and BS027 of four Rafale aircraft it claimed to have shot down to Dassault so the manufacturer could confirm whether the aircraft were still operational. One of the Rafale aircraft, identified by the callsign Godzilla 4, was destroyed over Akalia Kalan, a village in Bathinda in Punjab, India, approximately 70 km from the India–Pakistan border, while returning to Ambala Air Force Station, home to a major wing of the IAF’s Western Air Command. The downed jet was identified as Rafale EH BS001. On 6 June, the PAF said that No. 15 Squadron, also known as the Cobras, was responsible for shooting down IAF fighter jets. The unit operated out of PAF Base Minhas in Kamra with J-10C multirole fighters equipped with PL-15 beyond-visual-range missiles. According to Dawn, the Cobras deployed 18 out of the 20 aircraft assigned to the squadron for the intercept operation on 7 May. [26]

== See also ==
- List of Pakistan Air Force squadrons
- English Electric Canberra
- No. 15 Squadron RAAF
- No. 15 Squadron RAF
