= PAF Base Minhas =

PAF Airbase located at Attock District, Punjab, Pakistan

PAF Base Minhas
- پی اے ایف بیس منہاس
- Attock District, Punjab in Pakistan
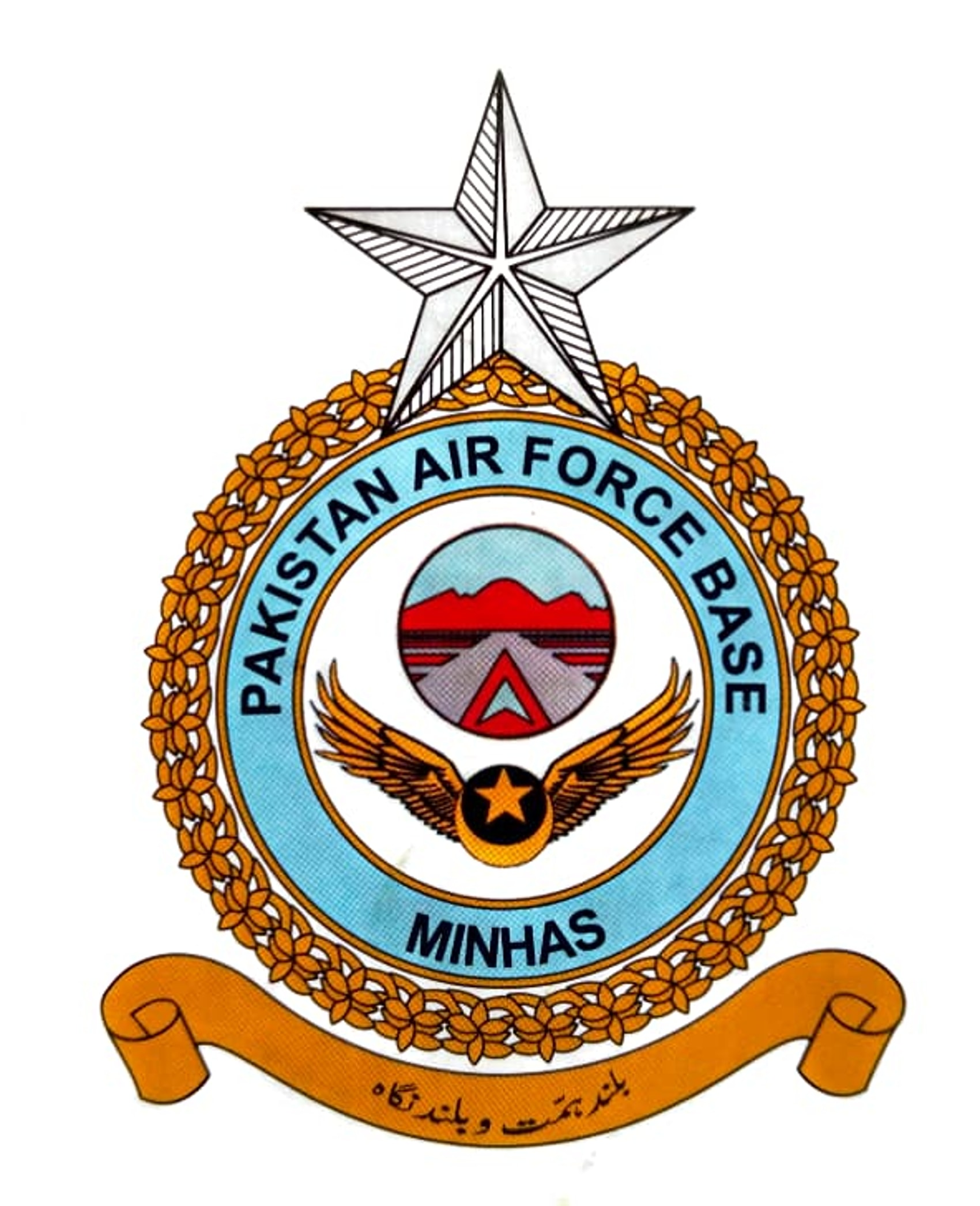

Site information
- Type: Air Force base
- Owner: Ministry of Defense
- Operator: Pakistan Air Force
- Controlled by: Northern Air Command
- Condition: Operational
- Other site facilities: Air University Kamra Campus; Pakistan Aeronautical Complex; NASTP Kamra
- Website: Pakistan Air Force

Location
- Shown with Punjab, Pakistan PAF Base Minhas (Pakistan)
- Coordinates: 33°52′8″N 72°24′3″E

Site history
- Built: 1942 (established); 1984 (upgradation)
- Built for: British India; Pakistan Air Force
- Built by: British Raj (foundation); Pakistan Air Force (later upgradation)
- In use: 1942 - present
- Battles/wars: Soviet–Afghan War; Operation Sentinel; War on terror Operation Swift Retort

Garrison information
- Current commander: Air Commodore Asad
- Garrison: 33 Tactical Wing
- Occupants: 3 AEW&C Squadron "Angels"; 15 MR Squadron "Cobras"; 16 MR Squadron "Black Panthers"; 87 Combat Support Squadron "Dragonflies"

Airfield information
- Identifiers: IATA: ATG, ICAO: OPMS
- Elevation: 312 metres (1,024 ft) AMSL
Runways
Direction	Length and surface
12R/30L (main)	3,033 metres (9,951 ft) Concrete
12L/30R (secondary)	3,020 metres (9,908 ft) Asphalt

Pakistan Air Force Base Minhas (IATA: ATG, ICAO: OPMS) is a Pakistan Air Force airbase located at (Kamra Cantt) Attock District, Punjab, Pakistan. It was named in the honour of Pilot Officer Rashid Minhas, who was awarded the Nishan-e-Haider for valor in the Indo-Pakistani War of 1971. Pakistan Aeronautical Complex is located in Minhas Airbase which manufactures aircraft like CAC/PAC JF-17 Thunder, PAC MFI-17 Mushshak, and Hongdu JL-8. It also rebuilds aircraft like the Dassault Mirage and Chengdu F-7. Currently, PAF Base Minhas is equipped with JF-17 aircraft operated by No.16 Squadron also called "Black Panthers".

== 2012 terrorist attack ==
On 16 August 2012, nine Tehrik-e-Taliban militants assaulted PAF Base Minhas at about 2 am. After a pitched battle all nine attackers were killed while two Pakistani security officials also died. The base commander, Air Commodore Muhammad Azam, who led the operation against the attackers, was also shot in the shoulder, but his injury was not serious. The militants also destroyed one Saab 2000 Erieye plane and damaged one or two others.

== See also ==
- Rashid Minhas
