= No. 53 Squadron PAF =

Pakistani air force unit

No. 53 Airborne Early Warning & Control Squadron
- ۵۳ سکواڈرن
- Active: March 2021 (5 years, 9 months and 12 days)
- Country: Pakistan
- Allegiance: Pakistan Air Force
- Branch: GD(P)/Air Defense
- Type: Squadron
- Role: Airborne early warning and control
- Part of: Southern Air Command
- Airbase: PAF Base Bholari
- Nickname: Hawks
- Mottos: صفتِ برق چمکتا ہے مرا فکرِ بُلند (Urdu for 'The hallmark of lightning shines from my concern for new heights')
- Anniversaries: 7 September (air force day)
- AEW&C radar: Erieye
- Engagements: 2025 India–Pakistan conflict

Aircraft flown
- Reconnaissance: Saab 2000 AEW&C

The 53 Airborne Early Warning & Control Squadron of the Pakistan Air Force also known by its nickname Hawks is an Airborne early warning and control unit of the Southern Air Command which operates Saab 2000 AEW&C aircraft from PAF Base Bholari.

It was originally formed in June 2020 without any aircraft while its home base was under construction. After the first Saab 2000 AEW&C systems were received in February 2021, the squadron was formally inaugurated in March of that year. Since its operationalization, the squadron has seen active participation in several military exercises including Exercises Naseem-ul-Bahar, Hawk Eye, Sea Hawk and Sea Spark.

In May 2025, during the 2025 India–Pakistan conflict, satellite imagery published by The New York Times and The Washington Post showed damage to a hangar at the Bholari airbase. Independent analysis of the imagery indicated a large hole in the hangar roof and debris scattered around the structure, consistent with a missile impact. According to ISPR, five PAF personnel, including a squadron leader and a chief technician, were killed at the base during the strike.

The damaged hangar at Bholari is typically used to house airborne electronic warfare and jamming aircraft. The strike damaged a Saab 2000 Erieye AEW&C airborne early warning aircraft of the No. 53 Squadron PAF. India further claimed that its strikes on Bholari had destroyed several Pakistani aircraft, including F-16s and JF-17s and Indian officials released satellite imagery as supporting evidence for these claims. Belated repair works were underway at the base in early 2026 with the stricken hanger under reconstruction as revealed by OSINT sources.

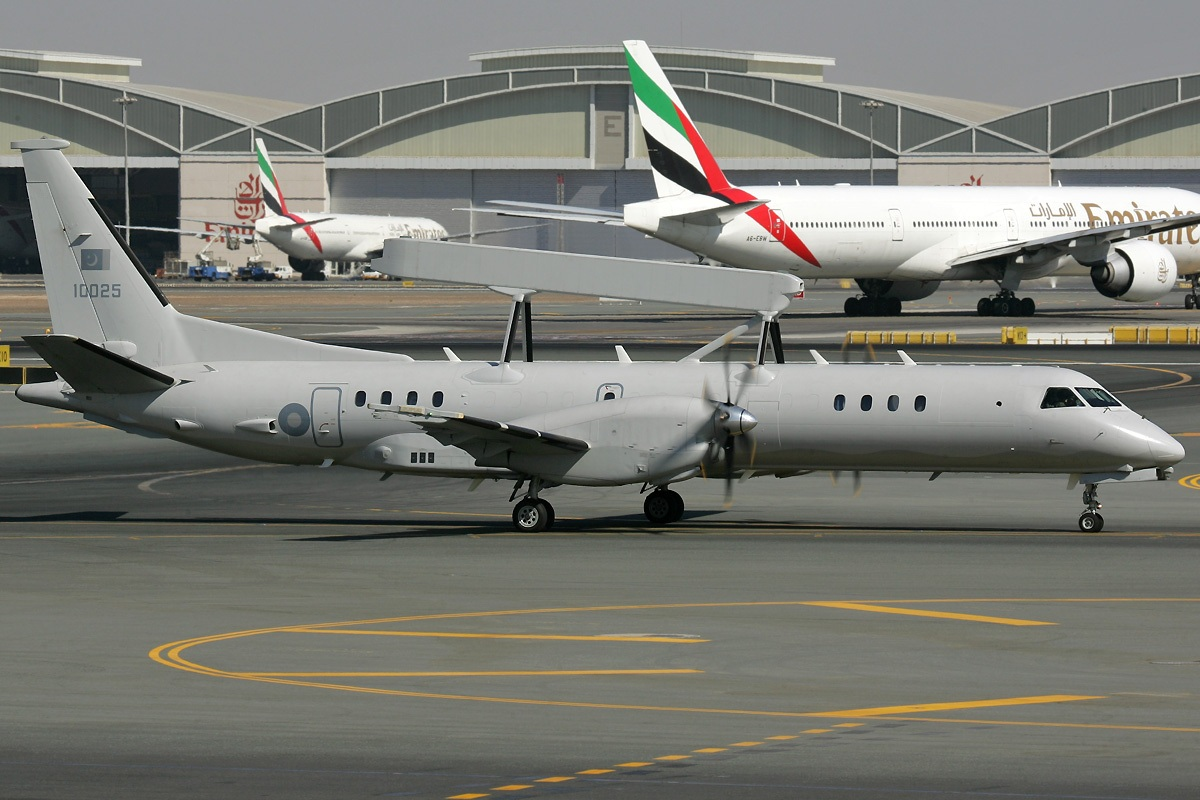
SAAB 2000 AEW&C (Erieye) System of the Pakistan Air Force

== See also ==
- List of AEW&C aircraft operators
- List of Pakistan Air Force squadrons
