= List of AEW&C aircraft operators =

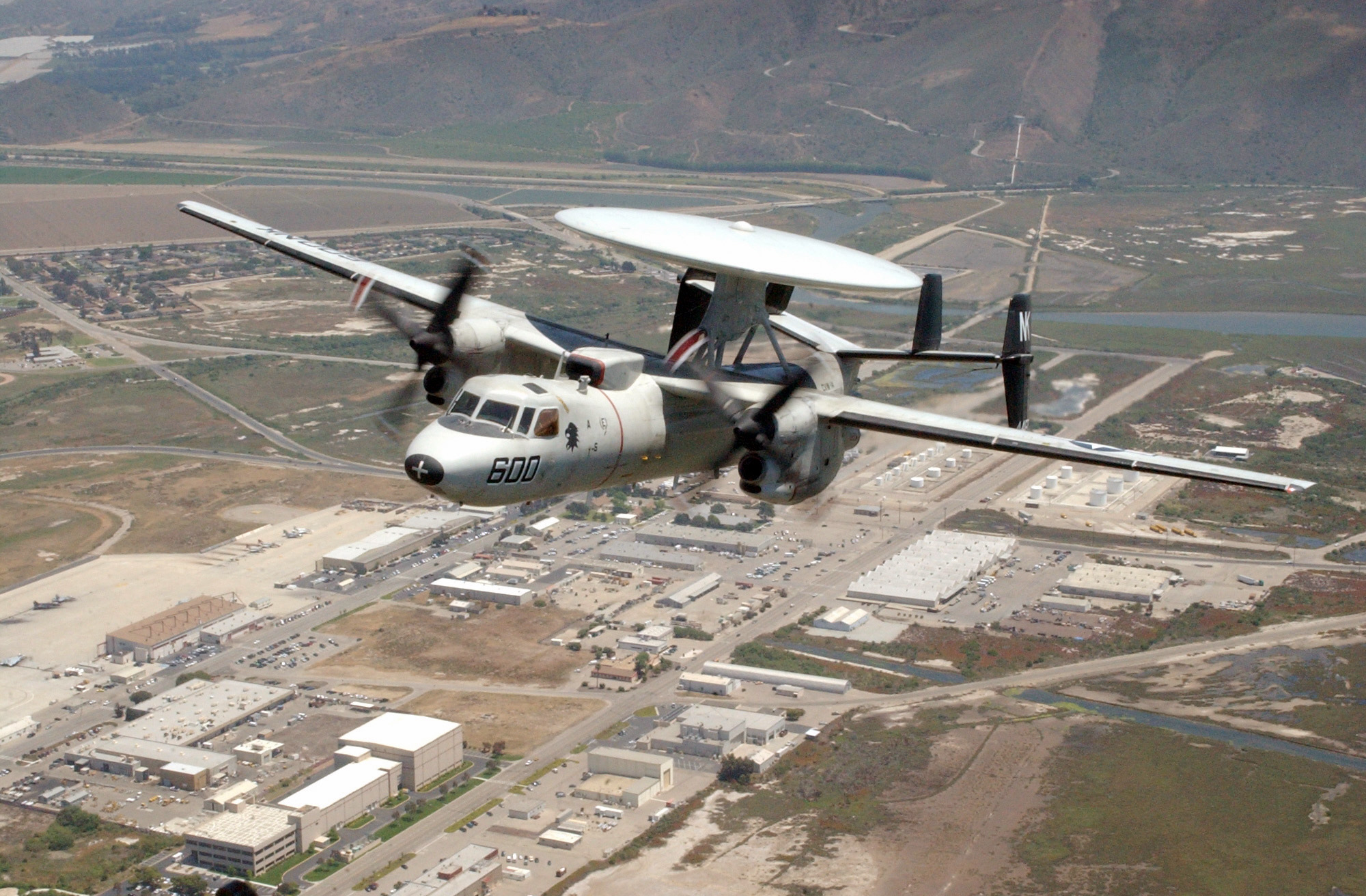
A US Navy E-2C Hawkeye over NAS Point Mugu.

Airborne early warning and control (AEW&C) aircraft are airborne radar systems designed to detect and track aircraft, missiles, ships and vehicles and provide command and control to direct friendly forces. Some operators, such as the Royal Air Force refer to such aircraft as Airborne early warning (AEW), while others reserve the shorter name for AEW aircraft lacking command and control facilities.

== Current AEW&C operators ==
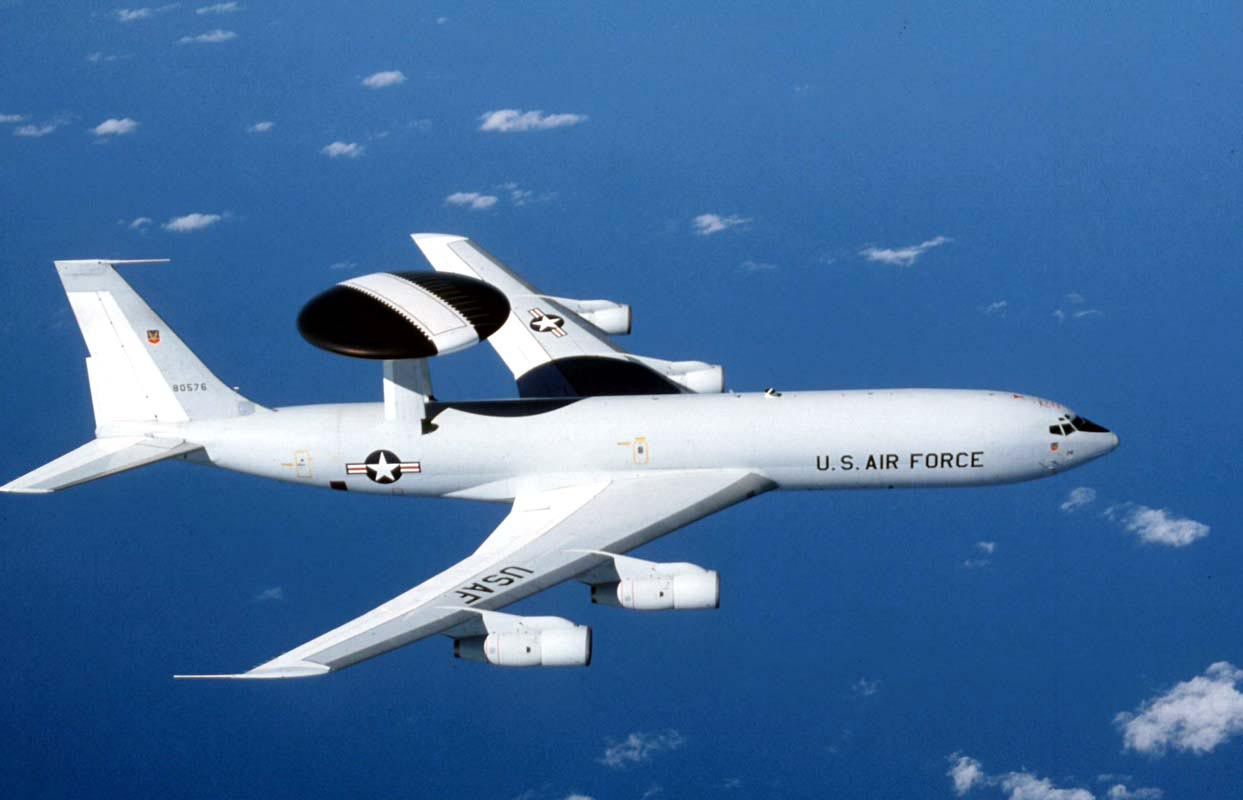
US Air Force Boeing E-3 Sentry AWACS.

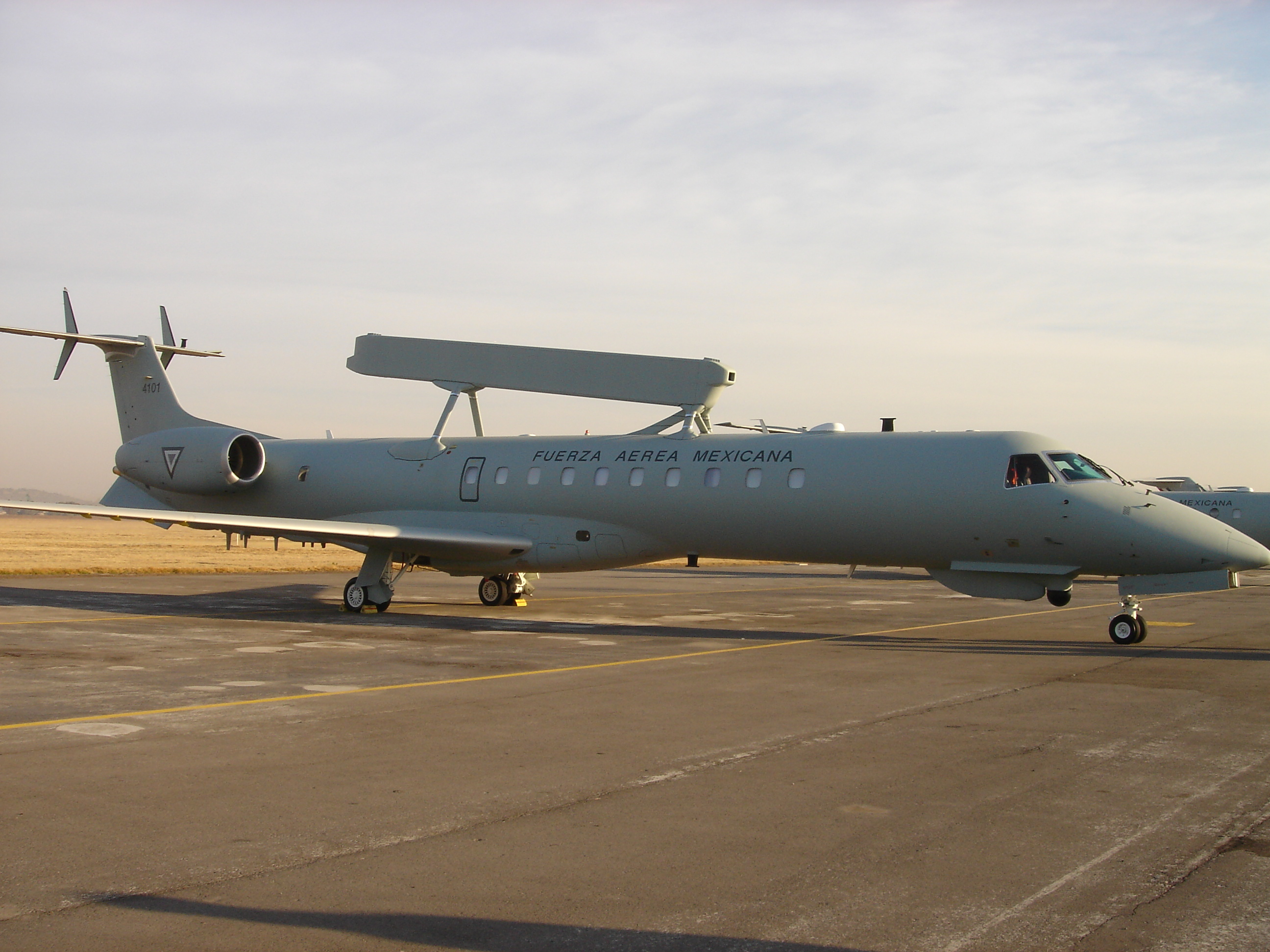
Mexican Air Force Embraer EMB-145.

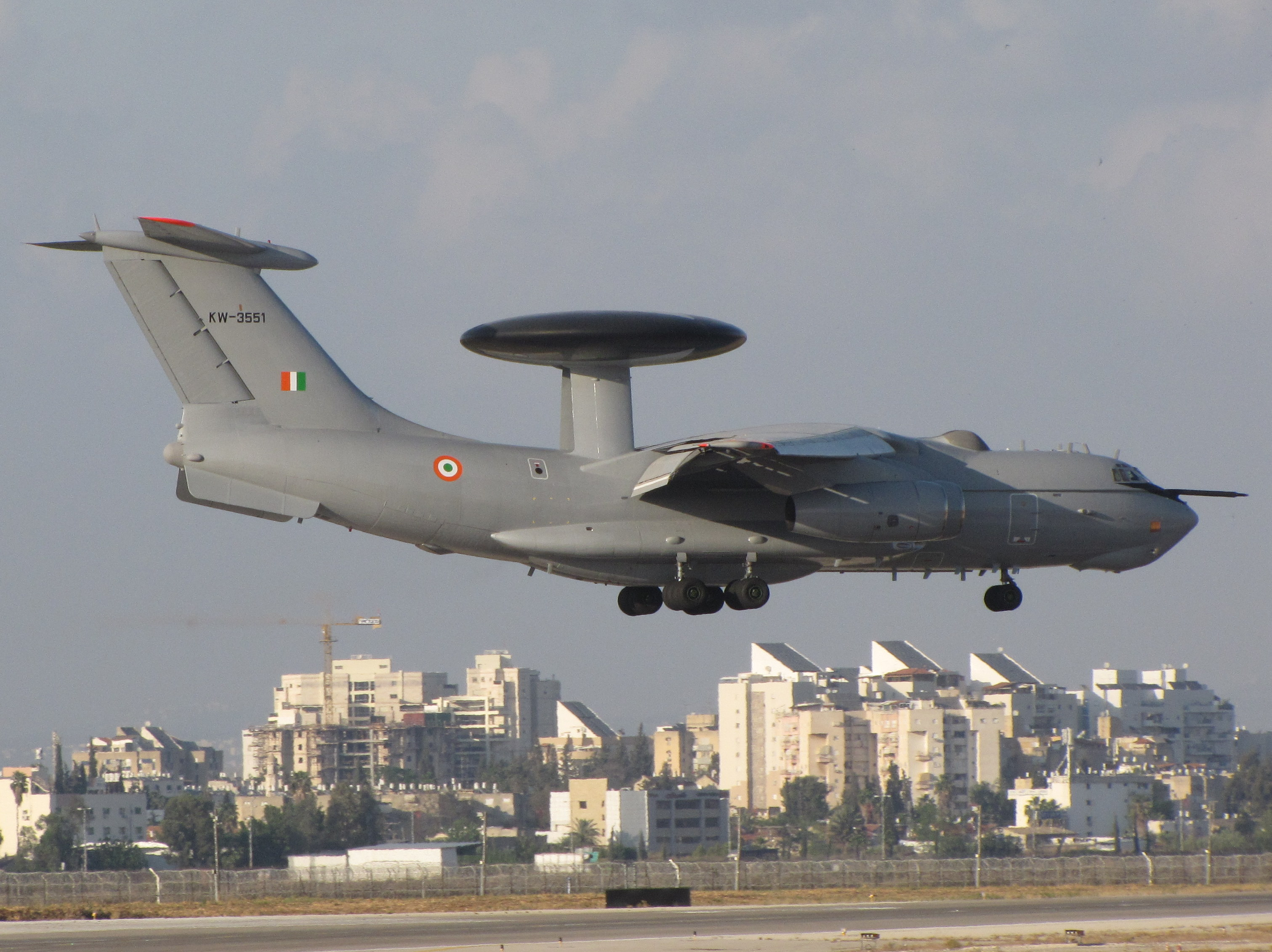
Indian Air Force Beriev A-50 EL/W-2090 AEW&C

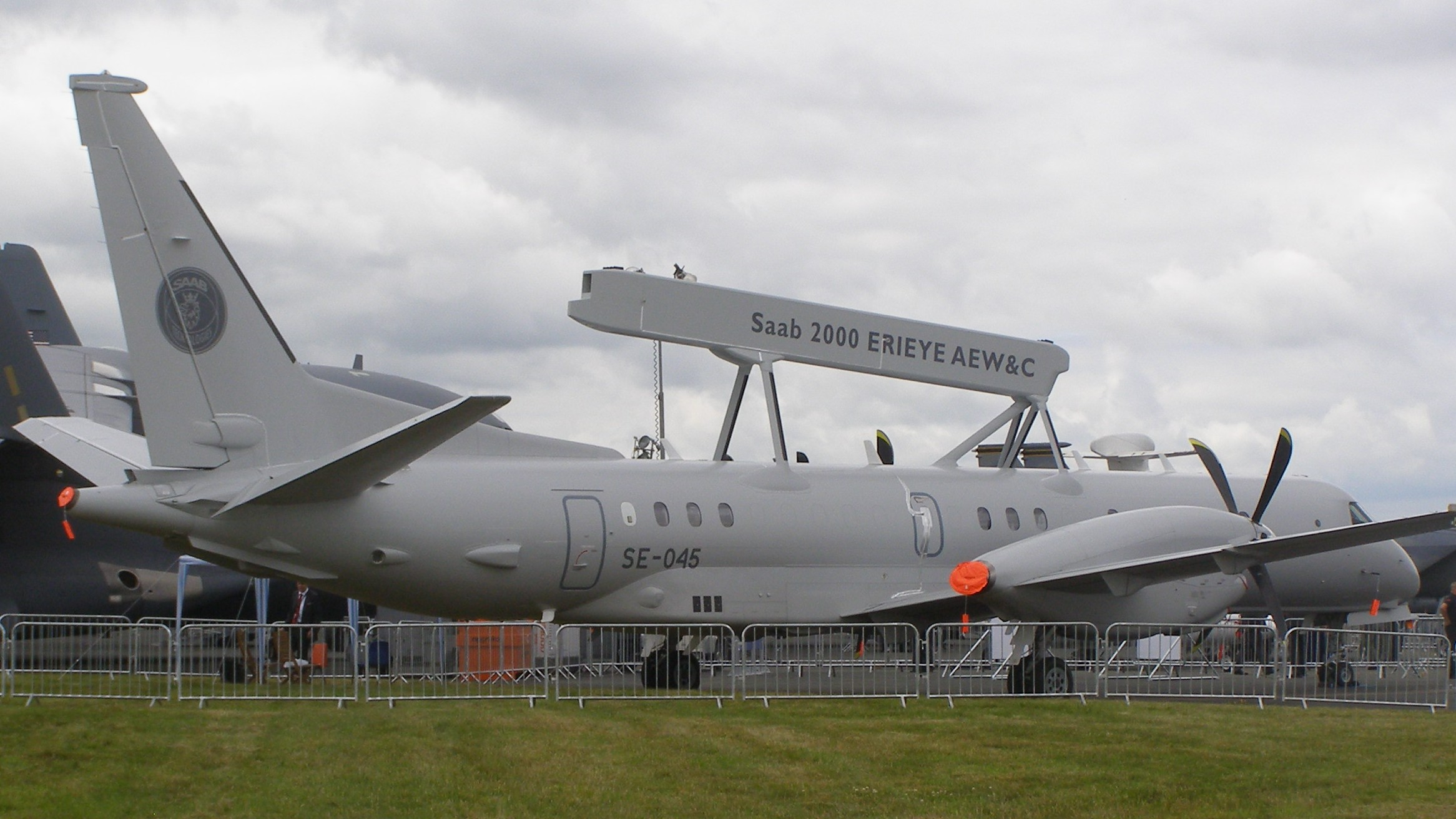
Saab 2000 Erieye AEW&C built for the Pakistan Air Force.

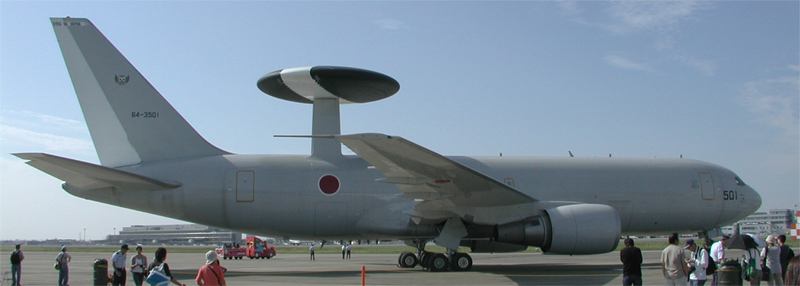
Boeing E-767 of the Japanese Air Self-Defense Force.

Operator	Aircraft	Unit(s)	Total	Country
Royal Australian Air Force	Boeing E-7 Wedgetail	No. 2 Squadron RAAF	6	Australia
Brazilian Air Force	Embraer R-99A	6th Aviation Group	5	Brazil
Chilean Air Force	Boeing E-3D Sentry	10th Aviation Group	2 (Note: Phalcon radar used.)	Chile
People's Liberation Army Air Force	KJ-2000	26th Air Division	5	China (PRC)
People's Liberation Army Air Force	KJ-200	Unknown	13+	China (PRC)
People's Liberation Army Air Force/ People's Liberation Army Naval Air Force	KJ-500	26th Air Division	15+	China (PRC)
People's Liberation Army Naval Air Force	Kamov Ka-31 Helix B	Unknown (Carrier Division)	Unknown	China (PRC)
People's Liberation Army Naval Air Force	Changhe Z-8 AEW	Unknown (Carrier Division)	Unknown	China (PRC)
People's Liberation Army Naval Air Force	Changhe Z-18J	Unknown (Carrier Division)	Unknown	China (PRC)
Republic of China Air Force	Grumman E-2T/K Hawkeye	2nd EW Squadron	6	China (ROC/“Taiwan”)
Egyptian Air Force	Grumman E-2C Hawkeye	87th Squadron	8	Egypt
French Air Force	Boeing E-3F Sentry	00.036 Squadron	4	France
French Navy	Grumman E-2C Hawkeye	4th Flotilla	3 or 4	France
Hellenic Air Force	Embraer EMB-145H	380th Squadron	4	Greece
Indian Air Force	Beriev A-50EI	No. 50 Squadron	3 (Note: EL/W-2090 radar, 2 of 3 delivered.)	India
Indian Air Force	DRDO AEW&CS	No. 200 Squadron	3	India
Indian Navy	Kamov Ka-31 Helix B	INAS 339	14	India
Israeli Air Force	Gulfstream G550 CAEW	122nd Squadron	7	Israel
Italian Air Force	Gulfstream G550 CAEW	14° Stormo	2	Italy
Japan Air Self-Defense Force	Boeing E-767	AEW Group	4 (Note: One more aircraft on order.)	Japan
Japan Air Self-Defense Force	Grumman E-2C Hawkeye	AEW Group	13	Japan
Korean People's Air Force	Antonov An-24	Unknown	1	North Korea
Republic of Korea Air Force	Boeing E-7 Wedgetail	5th Tactical Airlift Wing	4	South Korea
Mexican Air Force	Embraer 145AEW&C	501st Squadron	1	Mexico
NATO	Boeing E-3A Sentry	NATO AEW&C FC	14	Several
Pakistan Air Force	Saab 2000 Erieye	No. 13 Squadron	9	Pakistan
Pakistan Air Force	Shaanxi ZDK-03 K. Eagle	No. 4 Squadron	4	Pakistan
Russian Air Force	Beriev A-50	2457th AB SDRLO (Note: Air Base of Long Range Radiolocation Detection Aircraft.)	9<	Russia
Royal Saudi Air Force	Boeing E-3A Sentry	18th Squadron	5	Saudi Arabia
Royal Saudi Air Force	Saab 2000 Erieye	18th Squadron	2	Saudi Arabia
Republic of Singapore Air Force	Gulfstream G550	111th Squadron	4 (Note: To be replaced by 4 Gulfstream G550.)	Singapore
Swedish Air Force	Saab 340 AEW&C	17 Wing	2	Sweden
Royal Thai Air Force	Saab 340 AEW&C	702nd Squadron	2	Thailand
United States Air Force	Boeing E-3B/C Sentry	3rd,18th & 552nd Wings	32	United States
United States Navy	Grumman E-2C-I/II Hawkeye	10+ squadrons	55	United States
Turkish Air Force	Boeing E-7 Wedgetail	131st squadron	4	Turkey
Polish Air Force	Saab 340 AEW&C	43 Naval Aviation Base	2	Poland
United Arab Emirates Air Force	Saab GlobalEye	Unknown	5	United Arab Emirates

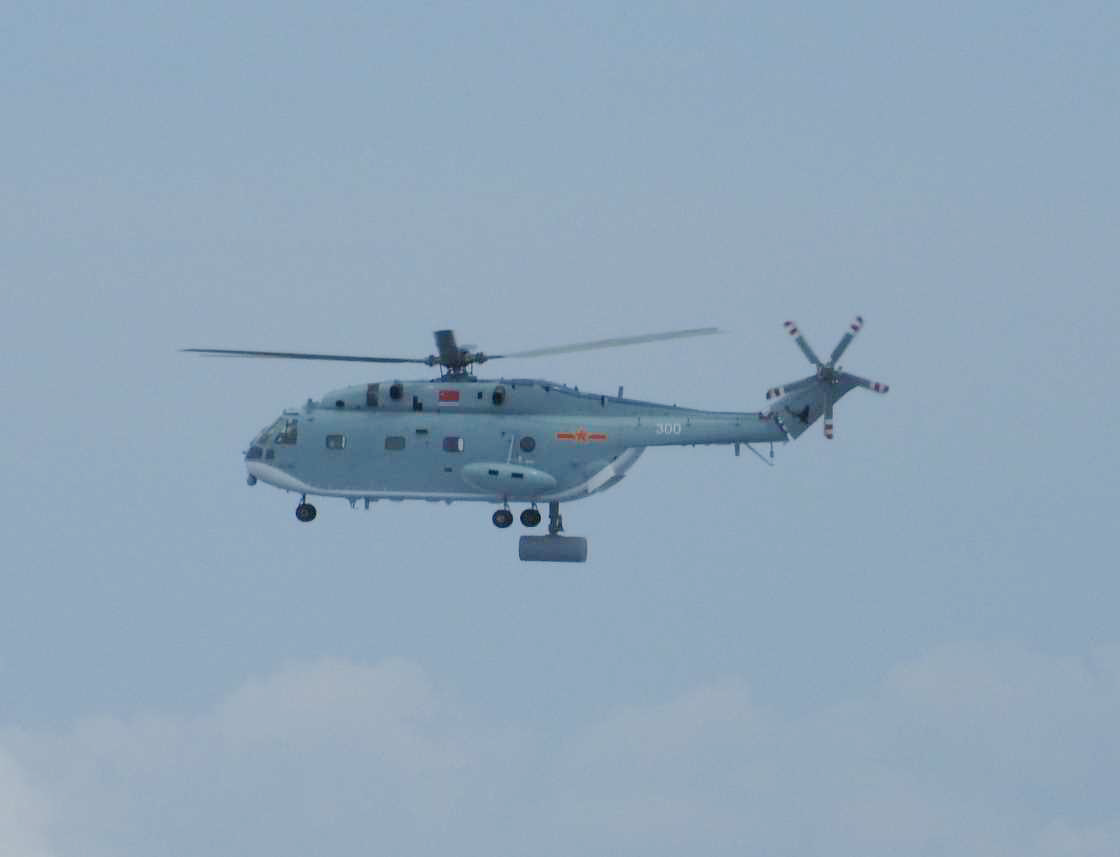
A Changhe Z-18J AEW platform taking off from Liaoning flight deck

== Future operators ==
Operator	Aircraft	First flight	Total
Indian Air Force	Airbus A321 AEW&C		6
Italian Air Force	IAI Eitam	2015	2
NATO	Boeing E-7 Wedgetail	2004	6
Russian Air Force	Beriev A-100	2017	Unknown
Royal Air Force	Boeing E-7 Wedgetail	2004	3
Royal Canadian Air Force		2033	
Swedish Air Force	Saab GlobalEye	2018	3
Ukrainian Air Force	Saab 340 AEW&C	1994	2
United States Air Force	Boeing E-7 Wedgetail	2004	26 by 2032

== Historical AEW operators ==
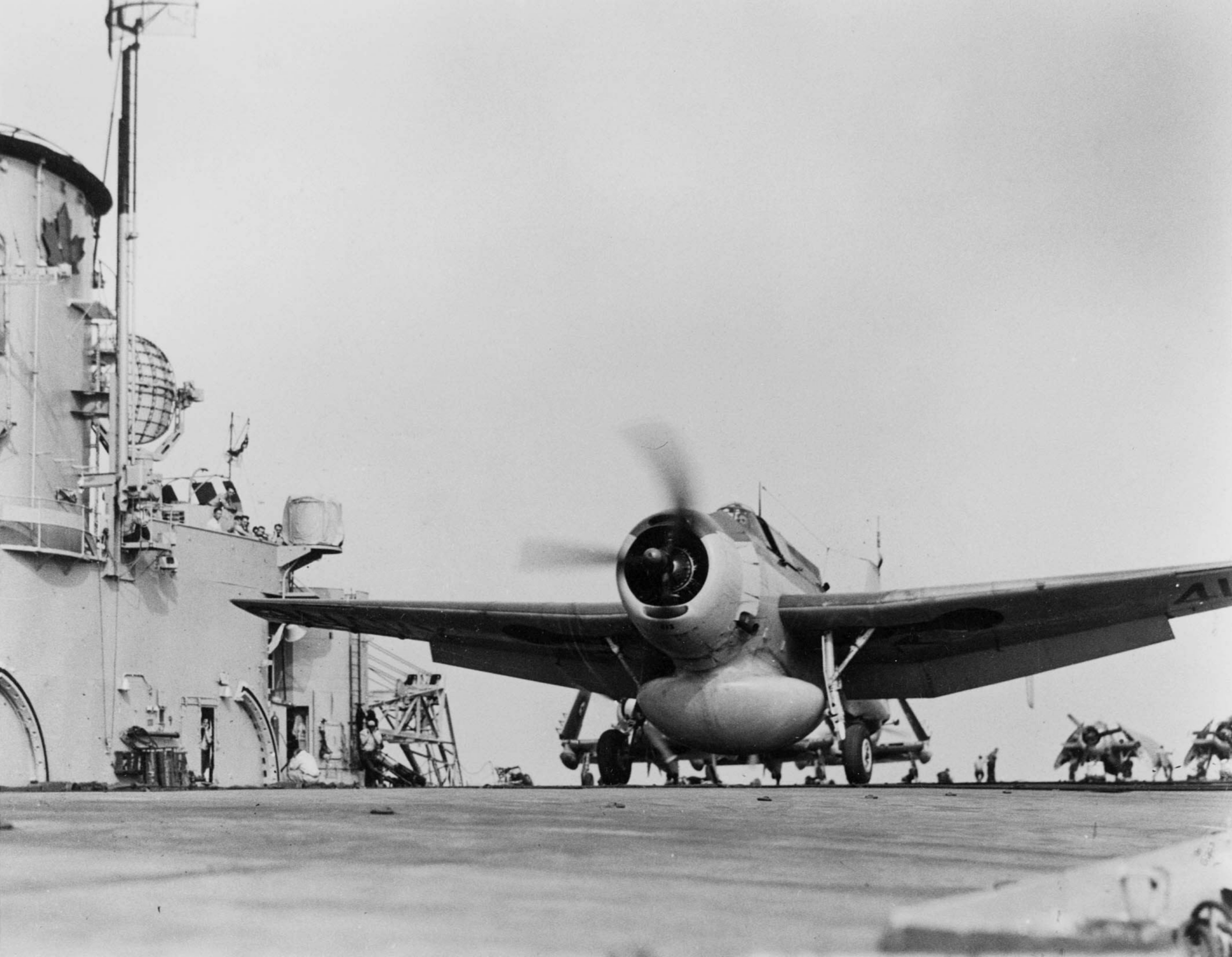
RCN Grumman Avenger Mk.3W2 on board HMCS Magnificent

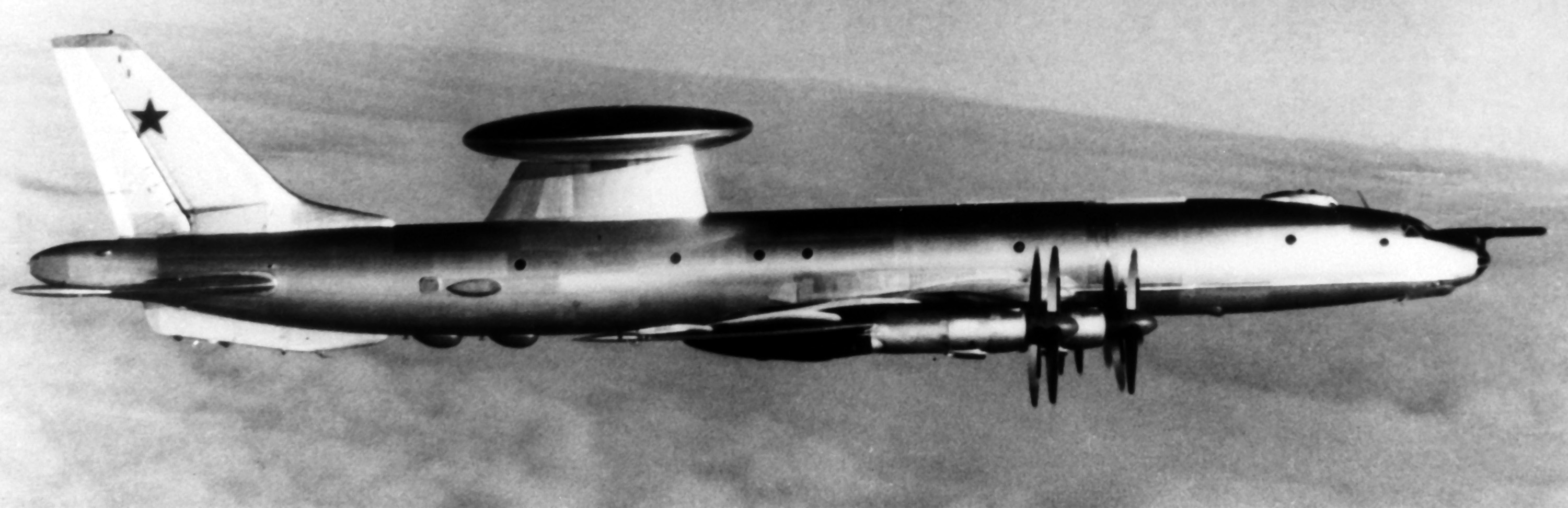
Tupolev Tu-126

Operator	Aircraft	Period	Total
Soviet Air Forces	Antonov An-71	1985–1991	3
Royal Air Force	Avro Shackleton AEW.2	1972–1991	12
United States Navy	Boeing PB-1W Flying Fortress	1946–1955	22
Royal Air Force	British Aerospace Nimrod AEW3	1982–1986	11
United States Navy & Marine Corps	Douglas A-1W Skyraider	1948–1967	417
Royal Navy Fleet Air Arm	Douglas Skyraider AEW.I	1951–1962	50
Royal Navy Fleet Air Arm	Fairey Gannet AEW.3	1959–1978	44
United States Navy	Grumman AF-2W Guardian	1950–1957	154
United States Navy	Grumman TBM-3W Avenger	1945–1950	40
French Aéronavale	Grumman TBM-3W Avenger	1952–1960	40
Japan Maritime Self-Defense Force	Grumman TBM-3W Avenger	1954–1961	Unknown
Netherlands Marine Luchtvaart Dienst	Grumman TBM-3W Avenger	1954–1960	24
Royal Canadian Navy	Grumman Avenger Mk.3W2	1952–1959	8
Royal Navy Fleet Air Arm	Grumman Avenger AEW	1951–1955	Unknown
United States Navy	Grumman E-1 Tracer	1961–1977	88
United States Air Force	Lockheed EC-121 Warning Star	1954–1978	82
United States Navy	Lockheed WV-1/WV-2 Warning Star	1954–1971	145
Soviet Air Forces	Tupolev Tu-126	1965–1984	9
Royal Air Force	Vickers Wellington	1944–1945	2+
Royal Air Force	Boeing Sentry AEW.1	1991-2021	7
Republic of Singapore Air Force	Grumman E-2C Hawkeye	1987-2012	4

== See also ==
- List of airborne early warning aircraft

== Notes ==
=== References ===
- Gibson, Chris (2011). The Admiralty and AEW: Royal Navy Airborne Early Warning Projects. Blue Envoy Press. ISBN 978-0956195128.
- Gordon, Yefim; Komissarov, Dmitriy (2010). Soviet/Russian AWACS Aircraft: Tu-126, A-50, An-71, Ka-31. Red Star Vol. 23. Hinckley, England: Midland Publishing. ISBN 978-1857802153.
- Hunter, Miranda; Davison, Peter (2006). Tupolev Tu-95 Bear. Warbird Tech. Vol. 43. North Branch, Minnesota: Specialty Press. ISBN 978-1-58007-102-4.
- Gunston, Bill (2009). Nimrod the Centenarian Aircraft. Gloucestershire, Great Britain: Spellmount. ISBN 978-0752452708.
- Hazell, Steve (2004). Fairey Gannet. Warpaint Series No.23. Buckinghamshire, UK: Hall Park Books. ISSN 1363-0369.
- Jones, Barry (2002). Avro Shackleton. Crowood Aviation Series. Wiltshire, UK: Crowood Press. ISBN 1861264496.
- Kowalski, Robert J. (1991). Grumman AF Guardian. Naval Fighters Number 20. Simi Valley, CA: Steve Ginter Publishing. ISBN 0942612205.
- Lake, Jon (February 2009). "Aircraft of the RAF – Part 10 Sentry AEW.1". Air International. Vol. 76, no. 2. Stamford, UK: Key Publishing. pp. 44–47.
- Lloyd, Alwyn T. (1987). Boeing 707 and AWACS in detail and scale – D&S Vol. 23. Shrewsbury, UK: Aero Publishers. ISBN 978-0830685332.
- Sullivan, Jim (1990). S2F Tracker in Action. Aircraft in Action No. 100. Carrollton, Texas: Squadron/Signal Publications. ISBN 978-0897472425.
- Winchester, Jim (2001). Lockheed Constellation. Classic Airliners. St Paul, MN: MBI Publishing. ISBN 0760311986.
- Eyes in the Skies – All the World's AWACS, Air Forces Monthly magazine, August 2008 issue.
