= List of airborne early warning aircraft =

This is a list of airborne early warning aircraft. An AEW aircraft is an airborne radar system generally used to detect incoming aircraft, ships, vehicles, missiles, and other projectiles and provide guidance to fighter and attack aircraft strikes.

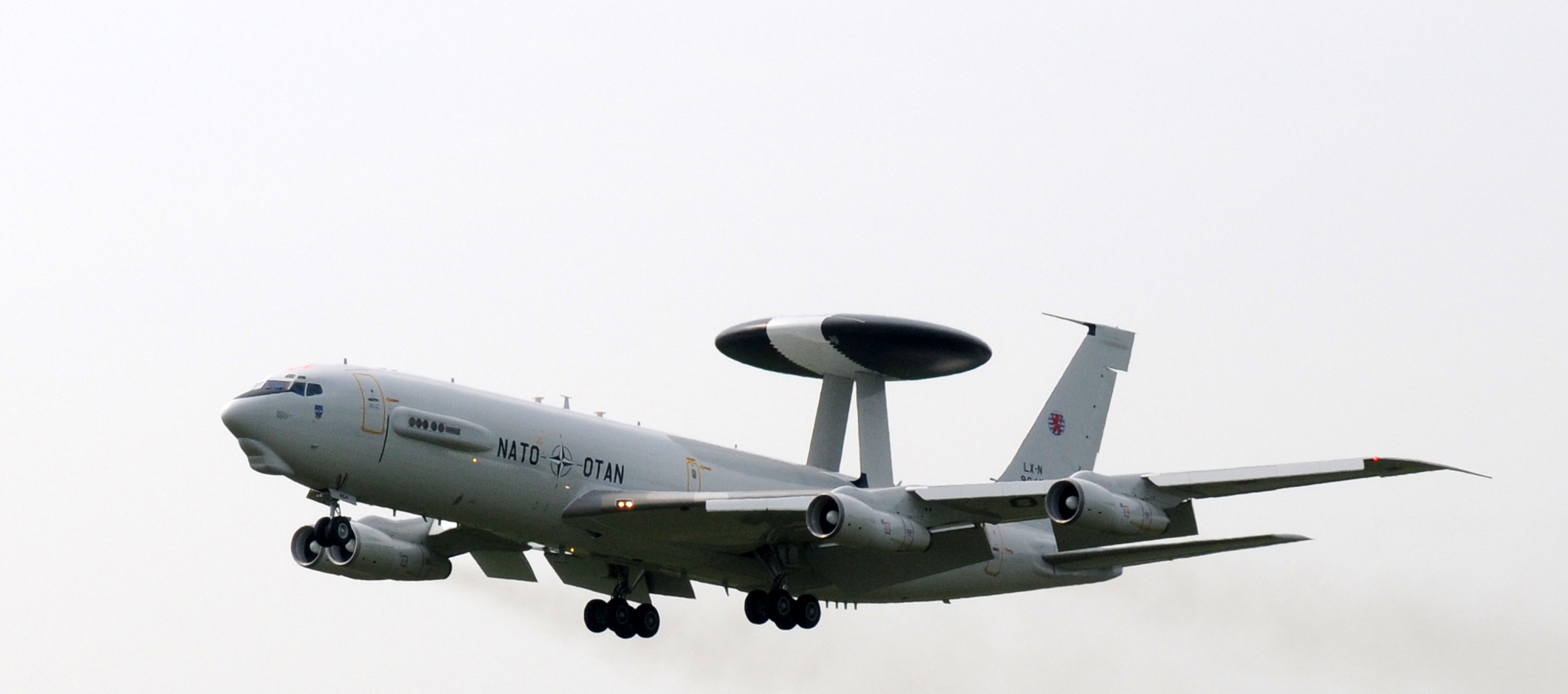
NATO Boeing E-3 Sentry AWACS AEW aircraft

== List of AEW aircraft ==
Type	Origin	Status	Propulsion	Entered service in	Quantity Ordered	Based on	Note
Antonov An-71	USSR	Production	Turbofan, high-bypass	1985	3	Antonov An-72	2 engines
AgustaWestland EH-101A	Italy	Production	Rotorcraft	2009	4	AgustaWestland AW101	3 engines
AgustaWestland Merlin Crowsnest	UK	Production	Rotorcraft	2021	1+ (Growing)	AgustaWestland AW101	3 engines
Avro Shackleton AEW.2	UK	Production	Propeller	1972	12	Avro 696 Shackleton Mk.2	4 engines
Beriev A-50	USSR	Production	Turbofan, low-bypass	1978	40 ~	Ilyushin Il-76	4 engines
KJ-2000	China	Production	Turbofan, low-bypass	2003	5	Ilyushin Il-76	4 engines
Boeing 707 Phalcon/Condor	Israel	Production	Turbofan, low-bypass	1993	2+	Boeing 707	4 engines
Boeing EC-137D	US	Production	Turbofan, low-bypass	1972	2	Boeing 707	4 engines
Boeing E-3 Sentry	US	Production	Turbofan, low-bypass	1975	68	Boeing 707	4 engines
Boeing E-7 Wedgetail	Australia	Production	Turbofan, low-bypass	2004	17	Boeing 737NG	2 engines
Boeing B-29 AEW	US	Production	Propeller	1951	3	Boeing B-29 Superfortress	4 engines
Boeing E-767	Japan	Production	Turbofan, high-bypass	1996	4	Boeing 767-200	2 engines
Boeing PB-1W Flying Fortress	US	Production	Propeller	1945	31	Boeing B-17 Flying Fortress	4 engines
British Aerospace Nimrod AEW3	UK	Project	Turbofan, low-bypass	?	11	Hawker Siddeley Nimrod	4 engines
Britten-Norman Defender AEW	UK	Prototype	Turboprop	?	2+	Britten-Norman Defender	2 engines
Douglas Skyraider AEW variants	US	Production	Propeller	1947	418	Douglas AD Skyraider	1 engine
EADS/CASA C-295 AEW&C	Spain	Prototype	Turboprop	?	1	CASA C-295	2 engines
Embraer R-99A/E-99/EMB 145 AEW&C	Brazil	Production	Turbofan, medium-bypass	1999	15+	Embraer EMB-145	2 engines
Netra Mk.1 (EMB-145SM)	India	Production	Turbofan, medium-bypass	2011	3	Embraer EMB-145	2 engines
Fairey Gannet AEW.3	UK	Production	Turboprop, contra-rotating	1958	44	—	1 double engine
Fairey Gannet AEW.7	UK	Project	Turboprop, contra-rotating	?	0	Fairey Gannet AEW.3	1 engine
Goodyear ZP2N-1W/ZPG-2W/EZ-1B	US	Production	Aerostat	1955	3	Goodyear N-class	2 engines
Goodyear ZPG-3W	US	Production	Aerostat	1958	4	Goodyear N-class	2 engines
Grumman E-1 Tracer	US	Production	Propeller	1956	88	Grumman C-1 Trader	2 engines
Grumman E-2 Hawkeye	US	Production	Turboprop	1960	276	—	2 engines
Grumman TBM-3W Avenger	US	Production	Propeller	1944	40	Grumman/General Motors TBM-3 Avenger	1 engine
Gulfstream G550CAEW/IAI Eitam/E-550A	Israel/Italy	Production	Turbofan, medium-bypass	2006	8	Gulfstream G550	2 engines
Hawker Siddeley P.139B	UK	Project	Turbofan, medium-bypass	?	0	—	2 engines
Kamov Ka-31	USSR	Production	Rotorcraft	1983	35+	Kamov Ka-27	2 engines
KJ-1 AEWC	China	Prototype	Turboprop	?	2	Tupolev Tu-4	4 engines
KJ-200 'Y-8W Balanced Beam'	China	Production	Turboprop	2001	13	Shaanxi Y-8	4 engines
Shaanxi Y-8J AEW	China	Prototype	Turboprop	?	4	Shaanxi Y-8	4 engines
Shaanxi Y-8 AWACS	China	Production	Turboprop	?	4	Shaanxi Y-8	4 engines
Shaanxi ZDK-03 AEW&C	China	Production	Turboprop	2010	4	Shaanxi Y-8	4 engines
KJ-3000	China	In development	Turbofan, high-bypass	2024	4	Xi'an Y-20B Kunpeng	4 engines
Lockheed AMSS	US	Project	Turbofan, high-bypass	?	0	Lockheed S-3 Viking	2 engines
Netra Mk.2	India	In development	Turbofan, high-bypass	?	6	Airbus A321	2 engines
Lockheed WV-2/PO-2W/EC-121 Warning Star	US	Production	Propeller	1949	232	Lockheed C-121 Constellation	4 engines
Lockheed EC-130	US	Production	Turboprop	1991	1	Lockheed C-130 Hercules	4 engines
Lockheed P-3 Orion AEW&C	US	Production	Turboprop	1988	8	Lockheed P-3 Orion	4 engines
Saab 340 AEW&C/S 100B/D Argus	Sweden	Production	Turboprop	1997	8	Saab 340	2 engines
Saab 2000 AEW&C	Sweden	Production	Turboprop	2008	5	Saab 2000	2 engines
Saab GlobalEye	Sweden	Production	Turbofan, medium-bypass	2020	8+	Bombardier Global 6000/6500	2 engines
Shaanxi KJ-500 Qianliyan	China	Production	Turboprop	2013	12+	Shaanxi Y-9	4 engines
Sikorsky SH-3H AEW	Spain	Production	Rotorcraft	?	3	Sikorsky SH-3 Sea King	2 engines
Sikorsky HR2S-1W	US	Production	Rotorcraft	1958	2	Sikorsky CH-37 Mojave	2 engines
Tupolev Tu-126	USSR	Production	Turboprop, contra-rotating	1962	12 ~	Tupolev Tu-114 Rossiya	4 engines
Vickers Wellington Ic "Air Controlled Interception"	UK	Production	Propeller	1944	1	Vickers Wellington	2 engines
Westland Sea King AEW.2/AEW.5/ASaC7	UK	Production	Rotorcraft	1982	13	Westland Sea King WS-61	2 engines
Xian JZY-01	China	Prototype	Turboprop	?	1	Xi'an Y-7	2 engines
Xian KJ-600	China	In development	Turboprop	2025	?	Xian JZY-01	2 engines
Yakovlev Yak-44	Russia	Project	Propfan, contra-rotating	?	0	—	2 engines

== See also ==
- List of AEW&C aircraft operators
- List of maritime patrol aircraft
