= HX Fighter Program =

Finnish Air Force procurement project (2015–2030)

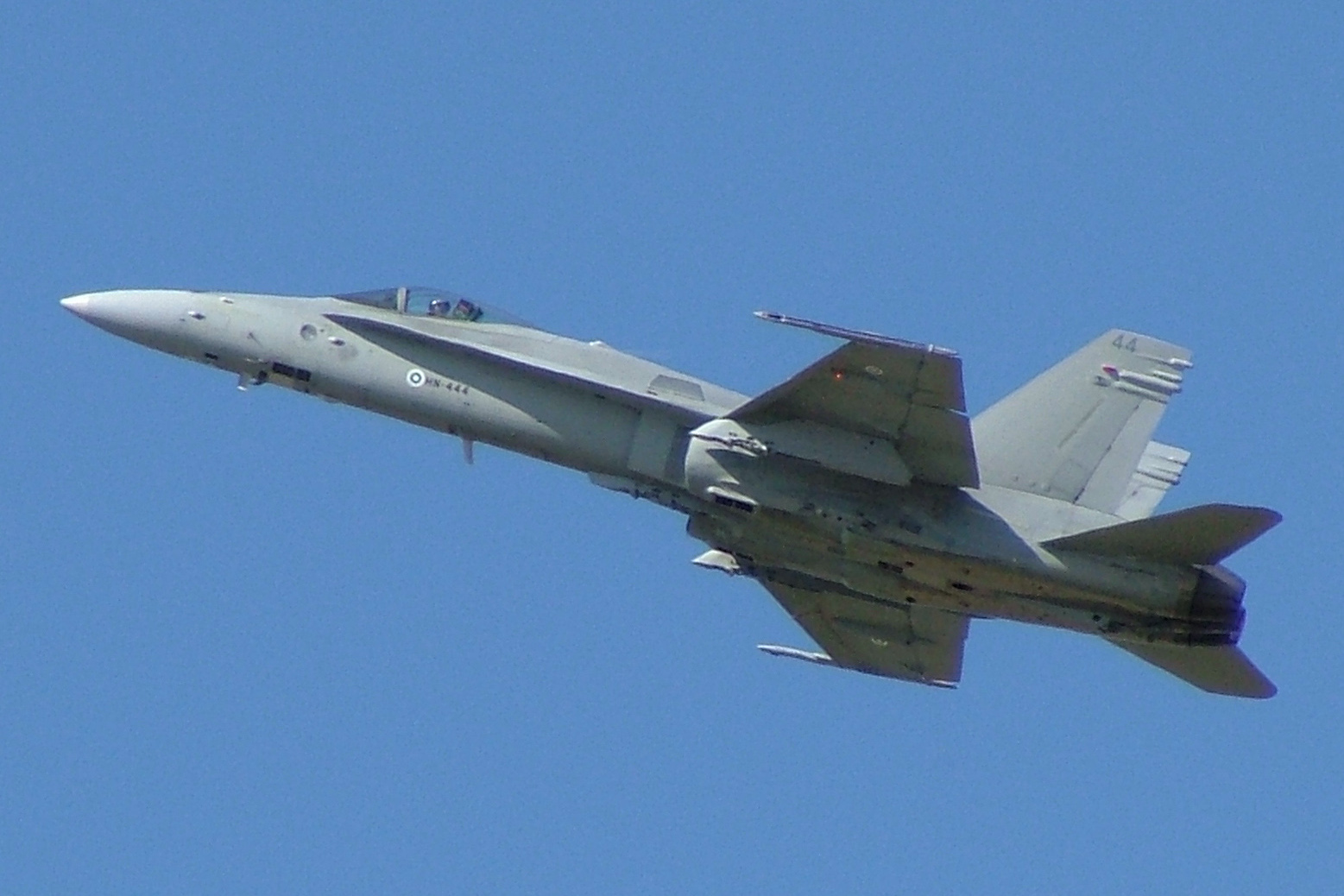
Hornet in Finnish Air Force livery

The HX Fighter Program is a fighter jet procurement program of the Finnish Ministry of Defence, aiming to acquire multirole fighters for Finland to replace the current Hornet fighters. If completed, the acquisition will be the most expensive state purchase ever made by Finland. The project started in autumn 2015 and the Government decided to procure 64 Lockheed Martin F-35 aircraft in December 2021. According to the project schedule, the new aircraft would arrive in Finland around 2025–2030.

== Background ==
In 2015, the final report of the Ministry of Defence's preliminary study working group proposed that Finland must acquire a system based on multirole fighters to replace the capabilities of its current Hornet fleet, to be phased out by 2030, in order to respond to changes in the operating environment and maintain Finland's defence capability. However, the conclusions of the report and the HX fighter project have been criticised, among other things, because of the high price of the project, the high CO_{2} emissions from the fighter jets and the information dissemination on the Defence Administration project.

Various experts have also estimated that instead of a solution based on just multirole fighters, it would be better to acquire, for example, interceptors, missiles, rockets and other anti-aircraft equipment, or to extend the life cycle of the Hornets currently in use.

According to a survey conducted in April 2020, the majority of Finns considered that the purchase of fighter jets should be postponed due to the recession caused by the coronavirus pandemic.

In October 2019, the Government decided that the acquisition should not cost more than €10 billion. The Finnish Defence Forces has sent an advanced invitation for tender in accordance with this price in late 2019. Maintenance and development costs over the lifecycle of equipment have not been calculated in this price. Taking lifecycle costs into account, the price of the acquisition could be between €25 billion and €40 billion. It is not possible to carry out the procurement within the normal defence budget, but separate funding will be needed for the procurement, which is decided by Parliament. According to Minister of Defence Antti Kaikkonen, approximately 64 fighter jets are to be acquired. Parties and politicians have been divided on whether to acquire the 64 planes as planned, or less or more.

Approximately 70 people work on the project in the Finnish Defence Forces. The programme director is Lauri Puranen, Programme Director for Strategic Projects at the Ministry of Defence.

== Proposed aircraft ==
At the start of the project, it was believed that the future fighter would be one or more of seven options:

- Boeing F-15 Eagle (US)
- Boeing F/A-18 Super Hornet (US)
- Dassault Rafale (France)
- Eurofighter Typhoon (Europe)
- Lockheed Martin F-16 (US)
- Lockheed Martin F-35 (US)
- Saab JAS 39 Gripen NG (Sweden)

All these manufacturers received a request for information (RFI) from the Armed Forces. A response to the RFI was in the end received from five suppliers: two responses were received in respect of American fighters and three European fighters.

=== Submitted offers ===
- 50× Boeing F/A-18E/F Super Hornet + 14× Boeing EA-18G Growler (US)
- Dassault Rafale F4 (France)
- Eurofighter Typhoon T4 (Europe)
- 64× Lockheed Martin F-35A (US)
- 64× Saab JAS 39 Gripen E/F + 2× GlobalEye (Sweden)

== Winner ==
The Finnish newspaper Iltalehti reported a rumor that several foreign and security policy sources had confirmed the Finnish Defense Forces recommendation of the F-35 as Finland's next fighter. Apparently, the same sources pointed to the F-35's capability and expected long lifespan as key reasons for it winning out over its rivals.

The F-35 was officially declared the winner by the Finnish government during a press conference on 10 December 2021.

The expected cost of the 64 F-35A Block 4 is €4.7 billion (or $5,3 billion) or $83M per aircraft.
