= Bholari =

City in Sindh, Pakistan

Bholari بھولاری
- City
- Location within Sindh Location within Pakistan
- Coordinates: 25°19′0″N 68°13′0″E
- Country: Pakistan
- Province: Sindh
- District: Jamshoro District

Government
  - Type: Municipal Committee
  - Chairman: Faqeer Dad
  - Vice Chairman: Manthar Ali

Population (2023)
  - Total: 169,613
  - Rank: 64th in Pakistan

Bholari, romanised: Bholāri, (Note: (Sindhi: ڀولڙي); (Urdu: بھولاری)) is a city situated in the Jamshoro District of Sindh, Pakistan. It lies approximately 8 kilometres southwest of Kotri, located between the Karachi–Hyderabad motorway in the north and the N-5 National Highway to the south. Bholari is integrated into the national railway system through the Bholari railway station, providing connectivity to regional and national rail networks.

== Demographics ==
Population

Historical population
Year	Pop.	±% p.a.
2017	158,239	—
2023	169,613	+1.16%

According to the 2023 census, Bholari had a population of 169,613.

Languages

Languages of Bholari MC (2023 Census)
1. Sindhi (64.9%)
2. Urdu (12.8%)
3. Punjabi (9.60%)
4. Pashto (7.70%)
5. Balochi (1.80%)
6. Others (3.20%)

== Bholari Air Base ==
The Pakistan Air Force's new PAF Base Bholari was inaugurated in December 2017. The base hosts the No. 19 Squadron PAF equipped with F-16 multirole fighter aircraft.
