= Saab 340 AEW&C =

Airborne early warning and command aircraft

Saab 340 AEWCS S 100 Argus
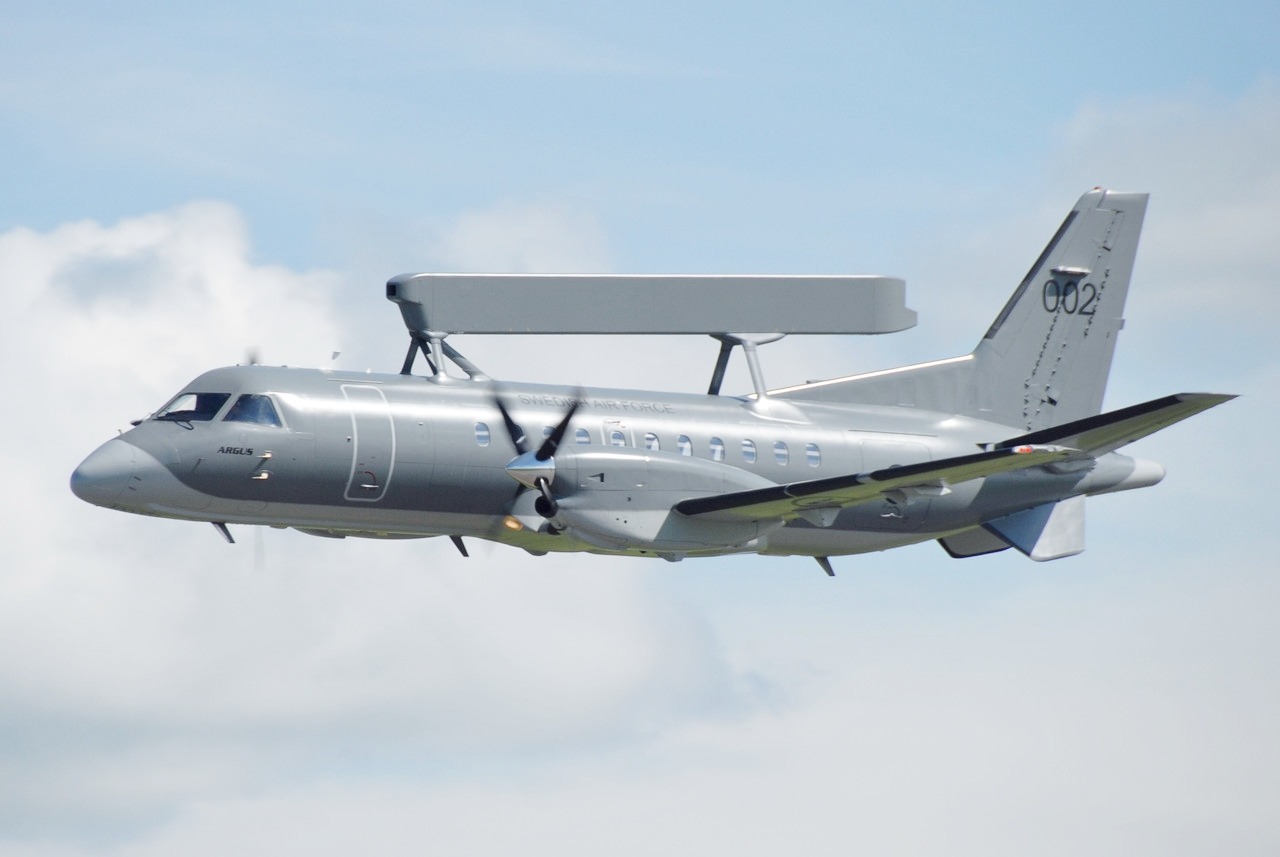
- An S 100B Argus at Malmen, 2010

General information
- Type: AEWCS aircraft
- National origin: Sweden
- Manufacturer: Saab AB
- Status: Active
- Primary users: Swedish Air Force (historical) Royal Thai Air Force; Polish Air Force; Ukrainian Air Force
- Number built: 6 Saab 340 AEW&C; 12 Saab 2000 AEW&C

History
- Manufactured: 1994–1999
- Introduction date: 1997
- First flight: 1994
- Developed from: Saab 340

The Saab 340 AEW&C is a Swedish airborne early warning and control (AEW&C) aircraft. A variant of the Saab 340 aircraft, it was designated S 100B Argus by the Swedish Air Force.

== Radar ==
Compared to the traditional circular radar on AWACS planes, such as the E-3 Sentry and the Beriev A-50, the Saab 340 has a static PS-890 AESA radar, which is the core of the Erieye system. It offers lower drag, but has a dead zone directly behind and in front of the plane, with a 120 degree zone of scan on either side of the airframe. The mounted radar is capable of tracking ships, planes and missiles up to 190–250 mi (300–400 km), while at an altitude of 20,000 ft (6,100 m).

== Operational history ==
Six S 100B Argus aircraft were produced for the Swedish Air Force. Four were permanently equipped with the Erieye active electronically scanned array (AESA) early warning radar. Two were fitted for transport missions during peacetime.

Two planes were loaned to Greece prior to the delivery of EMB-145 Erieye systems, which commenced in 2003.

In July 2006, Saab was awarded a contract to upgrade two of the Swedish Air Force's S 100B aircraft for surveillance missions, and for deployment in multi-national operations. The upgraded Saab 340 AEW-300 aircraft (S 100D Argus), entered service in 2009.

In November 2007, Thailand announced the intention to buy two S 100B AEW aircraft from the Swedish Air Force.

On 16 August 2012, nine Tehrik-e-Taliban militants assaulted Pakistan Air Force (PAF) Base Minhas at about 2 am. After a pitched battle all nine attackers were killed while two Pakistani security officials also died. The militants allegedly also destroyed one Saab 2000 Erieye plane.

On May 29th, 2024, the Swedish Ministry of Defense announced that two Airborne Surveillance and Control aircraft (ASC 890) will be sent to Ukraine, in the 16th military support package.

The Saab 2000 Erieye AEW&C fleet of the Pakistan Air Force was used during the 2025 India–Pakistan conflict. Following a BrahMos missile strike on PAF Base Bholari, the Indian Air Force has claimed to have destroyed a Saab 2000 AEW&C aircraft. This claim has been denied by Pakistani officials.

=== Overview (Saab 340 AEW&C) ===
- Aircraft 1 & 2 (S/N 340B-136 and S/N 340B-144): Original Swedish AEW&C aircraft. These were previously leased to Greece, later upgraded to the ASC 890 (S 100D Argus) standard, and have now been donated to Ukraine.
- Aircraft 3 & 4 (S/N 340B-159 and S/N 340B-168): Original Swedish AEW&C aircraft, sold to the UAE in 2010. Following the delivery of GlobalEye to the UAE, these were bought back by Saab, refurbished, and sold to the Polish Air Force.
- Aircraft 5 & 6 (S/N 340B-160 and S/N 340B-173): Two airframes (one of which was originally a transport variant) converted and sold to Thailand as part of the "Peace Suphanom" Gripen integrated defense package.

== Variants ==
Saab 340B AEW / S 100B Argus
(FSR-890) Erieye, for the Thai Air Force.
Saab 340B AEW-200
(IS-340) Erieye
Saab 340B AEW-300 / S 100D Argus
(ASC-890) Erieye
B.K.1
(Thai: บ.ก.๑) Royal Thai Armed Forces designation for the Saab 340 AEW&C.

== Operators ==
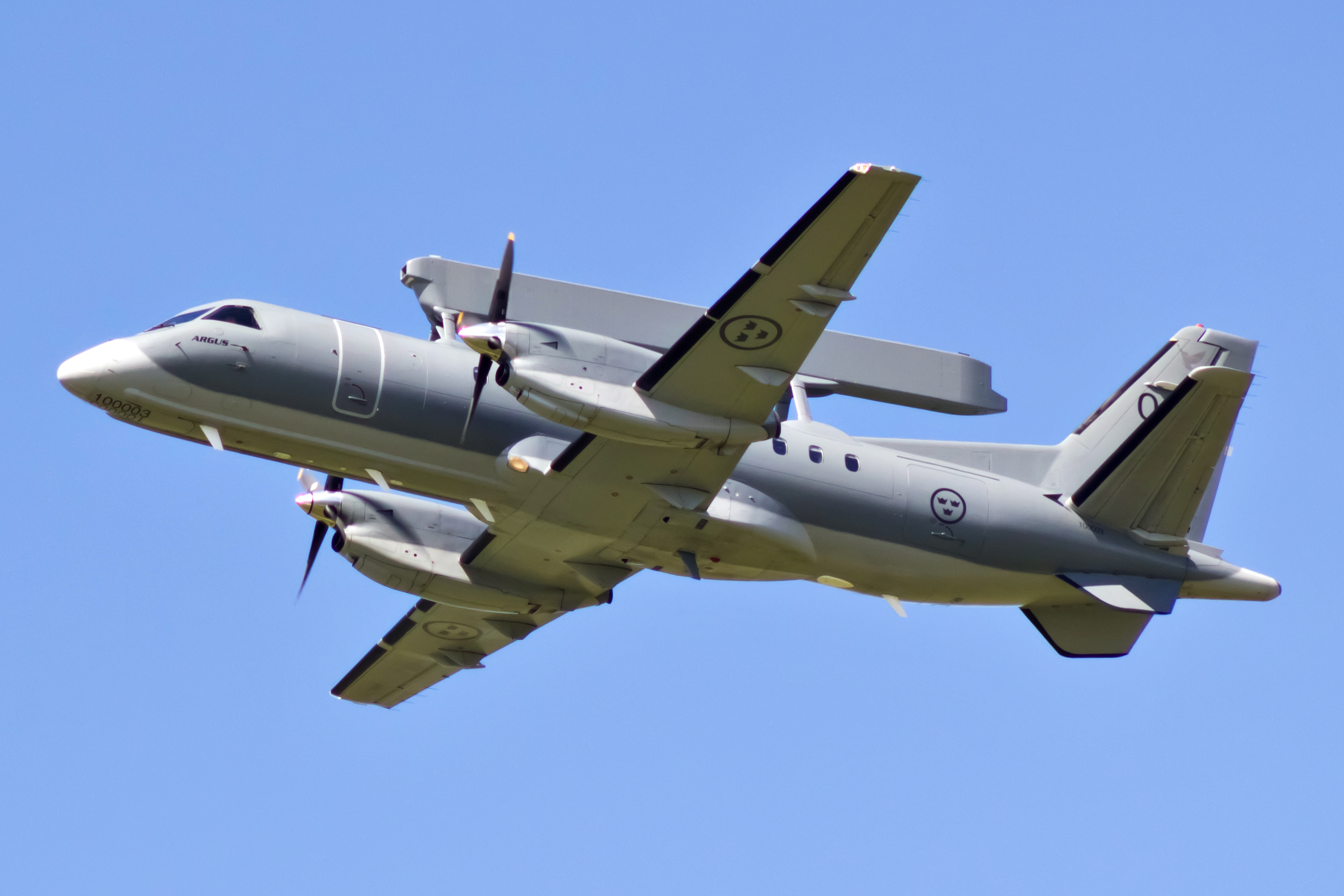
A Swedish Air Force Saab 340 Argus

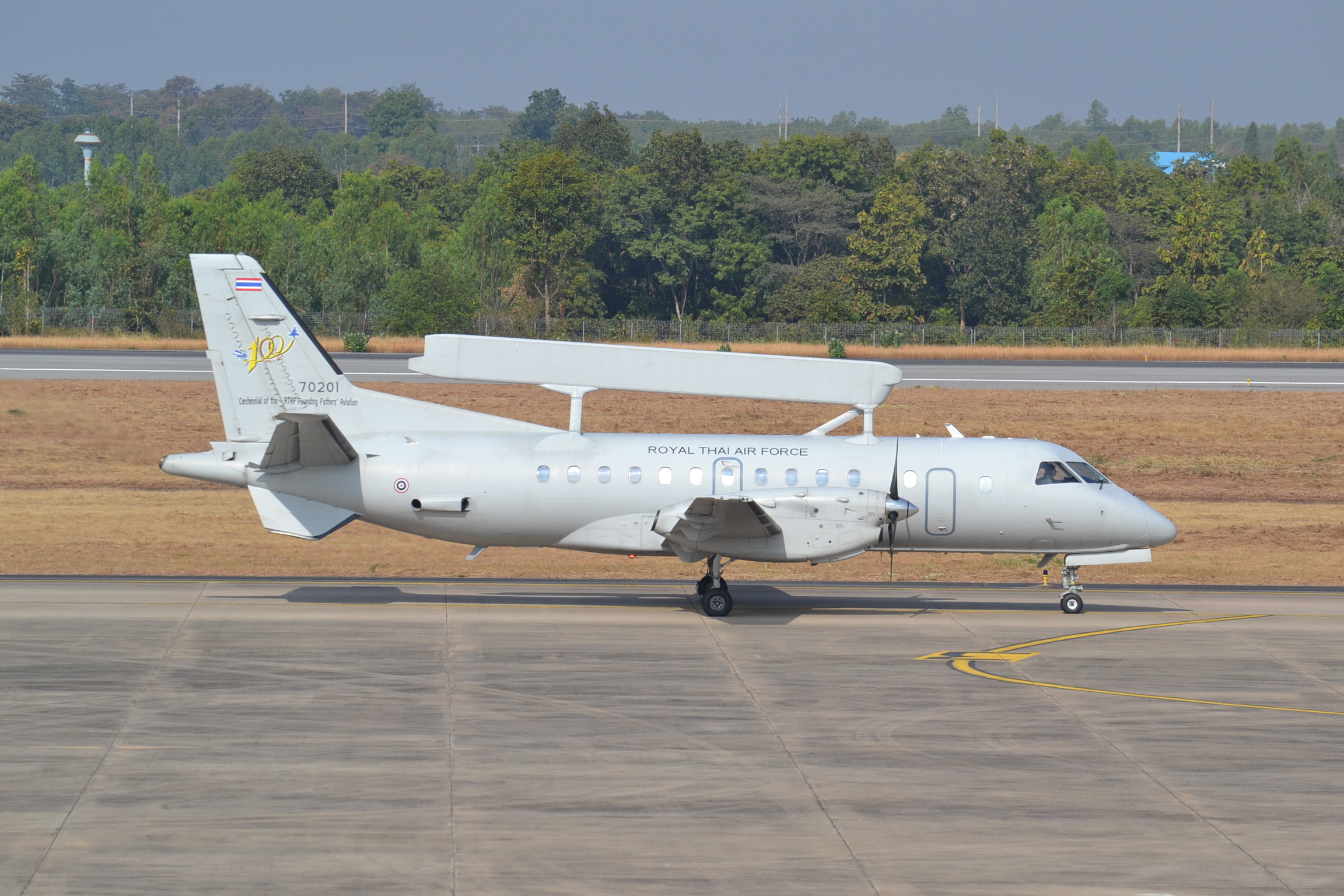
A Royal Thai Air Force Saab 340 AEW&C

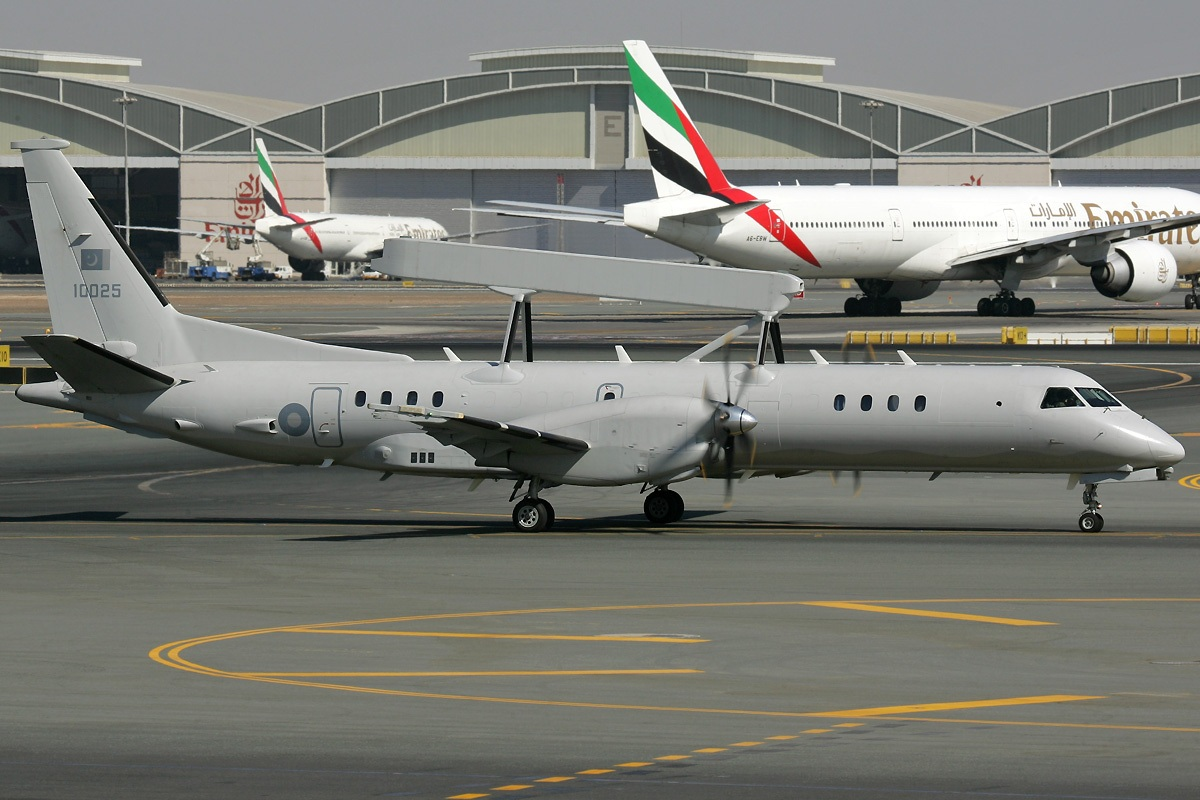
A Pakistan Air Force Saab 2000 AEW&C

Current
Thailand

- Royal Thai Air Force operates two aircraft delivered completely in October 2012.

Poland

- Polish Air Force – Purchased two used (ex-UAE) Saab 340 AEW early warning and control aircraft in July 2023, with deliveries planned to start in 2024. The first plane was delivered in March 2024. The second aircraft was delivered in June 2024.

Ukraine

- Ukraine was assigned 2 ASC 890 (S100D) from Sweden as part of the 16th support package. In June 2025 one of them allegedly participated in the first ever unconfirmed shooting down of a Russian Su-35 by F-16.

Former operators
Sweden

- Swedish Air Force operated two aircraft (2 S100D / ASC890). SAAB GlobalEye was ordered as replacements in June 2022.

Greece

- Hellenic Air Force formerly loaned two aircraft.

United Arab Emirates

- United Arab Emirates Air Force – 2 operated. Retired in 2020 after replacement by GlobalEye (Bombardier 6000).

=== Saab 2000 AEW&C operators ===
In December 1988, Saab decided to build a stretched derivative of its Saab 340, called Saab 2000.

Pakistan

- Pakistan Air Force operates 9 aircraft. 10 were acquired, 1 was destroyed in the 2012 Kamra Airbase Attack.

Saudi Arabia

- Royal Saudi Air Force operates 2 aircraft.

== Specifications (Saab 340 AEW&C) ==
Data from

General characteristics

- Crew: 6
- Length: 20.57 m (67 ft 6 in)
- Wingspan: 21.44 m (70 ft 4 in)
- Height: 6.97 m (22 ft 10 in)
- Empty weight: 10,300 kg (22,707 lb)
- Gross weight: 13,155 kg (29,000 lb)
- Powerplant: 2 × General Electric CT7-9B , 1,390 kW (1,870 hp) each

Performance

- Endurance: 5+ hours
- Service ceiling: 7,620 m (25,000 ft)

== See also ==
Related development

- Saab 340
- Saab 2000 AEW&C
- Netra AEW&C

Related lists

- List of airborne early warning aircraft
