= Erieye =

Airborne Early Warning and Control System used on a variety of aircraft platforms

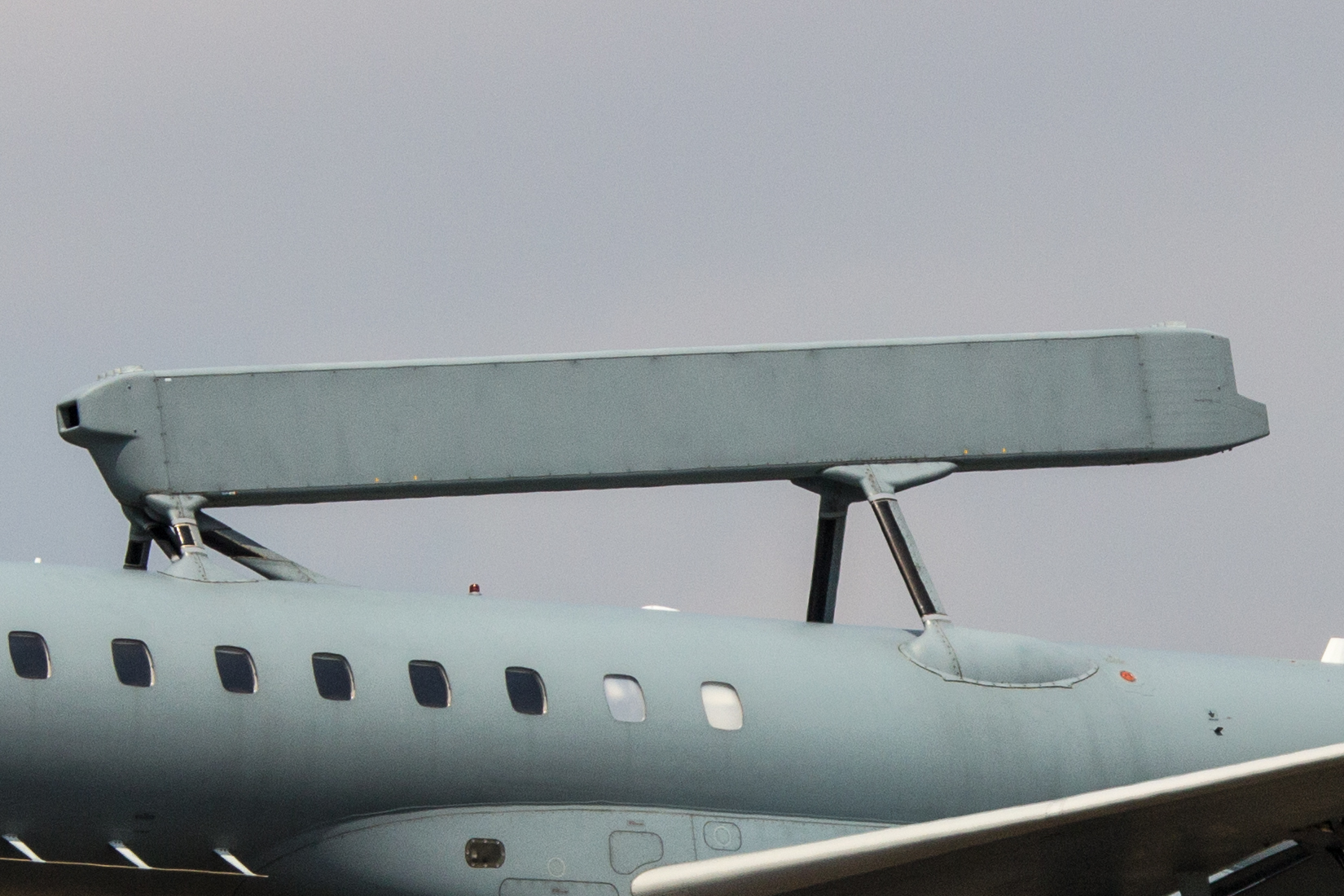
- Erieye radar mounted on a fuselage
- Country of origin: Sweden
- Introduced: 1996
- No. built: Erieye: 6 Saab 340; 12 Saab 2000; 10 Embraer ERJ-145; Erieye-ER: 5 on modernised Embraer ERJ-145; 5 delivered and 3 ordered with the Bombardier Global 6000 (GlobalEye)
- Type: Multi-mode active electronically scanned array (AESA) pulse-Doppler radar
- Frequency: S band
- Range: 450 km
- Altitude: > 20 km (> 65,000 ft)
- Azimuth: 150° to each side

The Erieye radar system is an Airborne Early Warning and Control System (AEW&C) developed by Saab Electronic Defence Systems, formerly Ericsson Microwave Systems, of Sweden. It uses active electronically scanned array (AESA) technology. The Erieye is used on a variety of aircraft platforms, such as the Saab 340 and Embraer R-99. The radar was integrated on the Bombardier Global 6000, the third platform for the system, in 2016–18 and is designated as the GlobalEye.

The Erieye Ground Interface Segment, EGIS, not to be confused with the Aegis combat system, is a major component of the software used by the Erieye system.

The radar provides 300 degree coverage and has an instrumental range of 450 km and detection range of 350 km in a dense hostile electronic warfare environment—in heavy radar clutter and at low target altitudes. The radar is capable of identifying friends or foes, and has a sea surveillance mode.

The Erieye system has full interoperability with NATO air defence command and control systems like Link-16 and other military tactical data link systems like the Pakistani Link-17.

== History ==
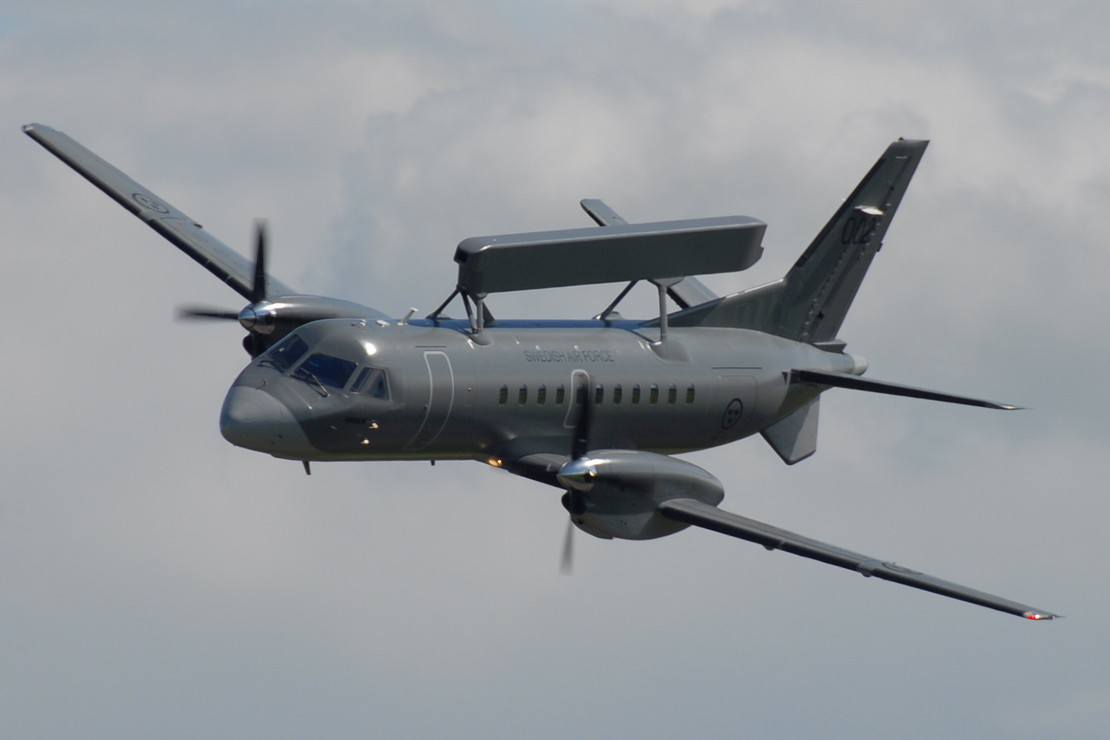
A Saab 340 AEW&C

In 1985, Ericsson Microwave Systems were contracted by the Swedish Defence Material Administration to develop what would become the PS-890 Erieye AEW radar. In 1985, a dummy dual-sided phased array antenna was tested on a twin-engined Fairchild Metro aircraft. In 1987, the Metro aircraft was fitted with the radar system for flight trials. In 1993, production started on six radars for the Swedish Air Force, for fitting in Saab 340 aircraft. In 1996, the first two production radars were delivered. The name Erieye is short for Ericsson eye.

=== Operational history ===
==== Pakistan ====
On 16 August 2012, nine Tehrik-e-Taliban militants assaulted Pakistan Air Force (PAF) Base Minhas at about 2 am. After a pitched battle all nine attackers were killed while two Pakistani security officials also died. The militants allegedly also destroyed one Saab 2000 Erieye plane and allegedly damaged one or two other aircraft.

The Saab 2000 Erieye AEW&C fleet of the Pakistan Air Force was used during the 2025 India–Pakistan conflict. Following a BrahMos missile strike on PAF Base Bholari, the Indian Air Force has claimed to have destroyed a Saab 2000 AEW&C aircraft. This claim has been denied by Pakistani officials.

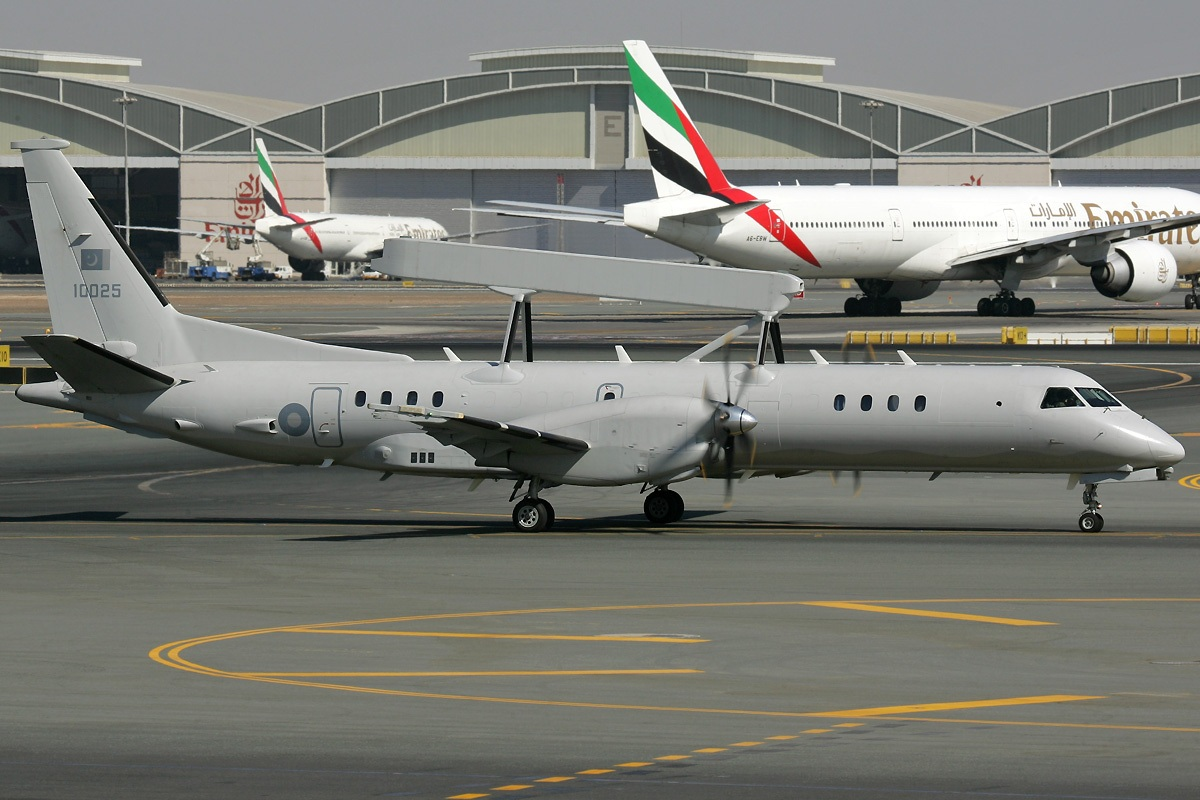
A Saab 2000 Erieye of the Pakistan Air Force

== Design ==
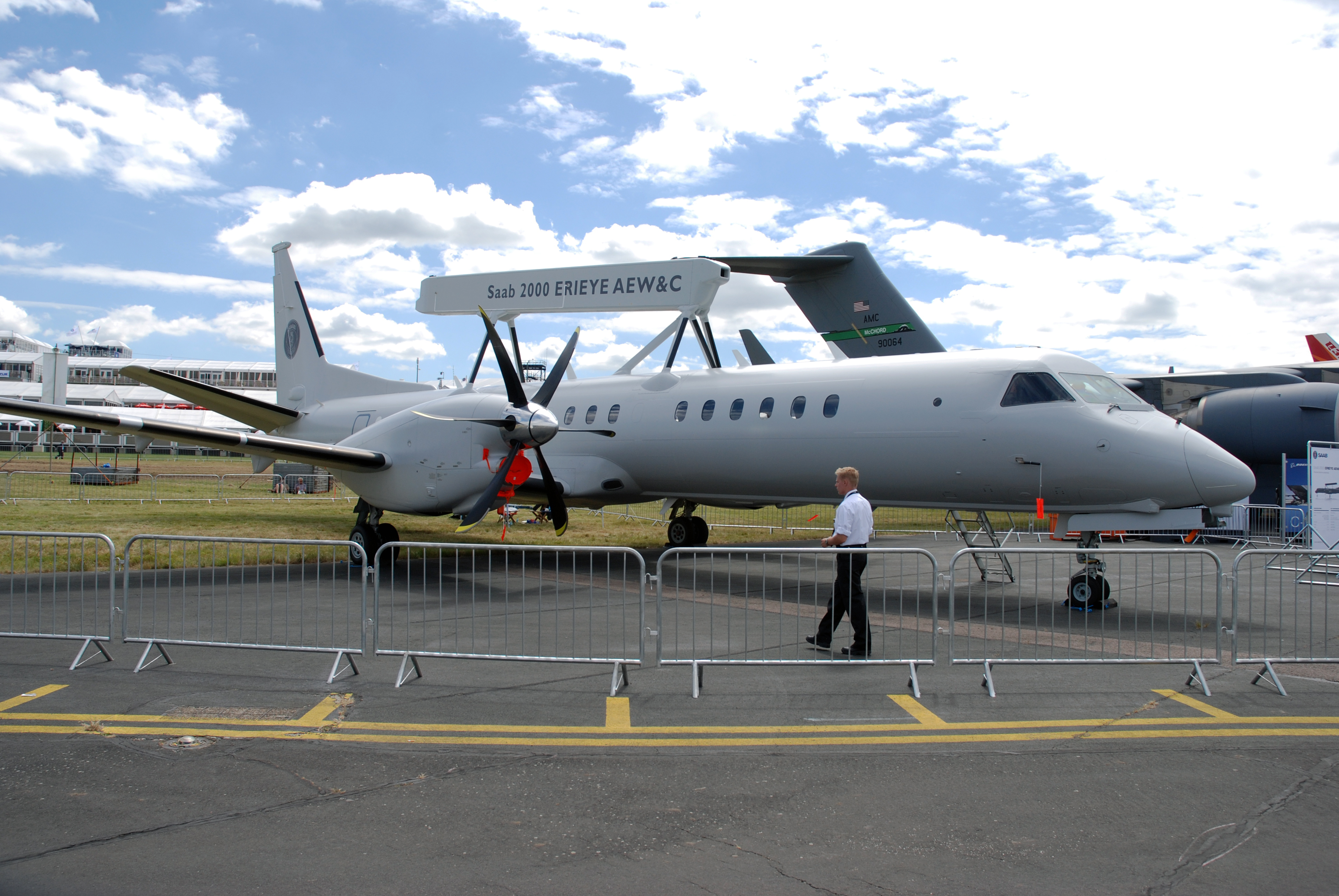
The Saab 2000 Erieye

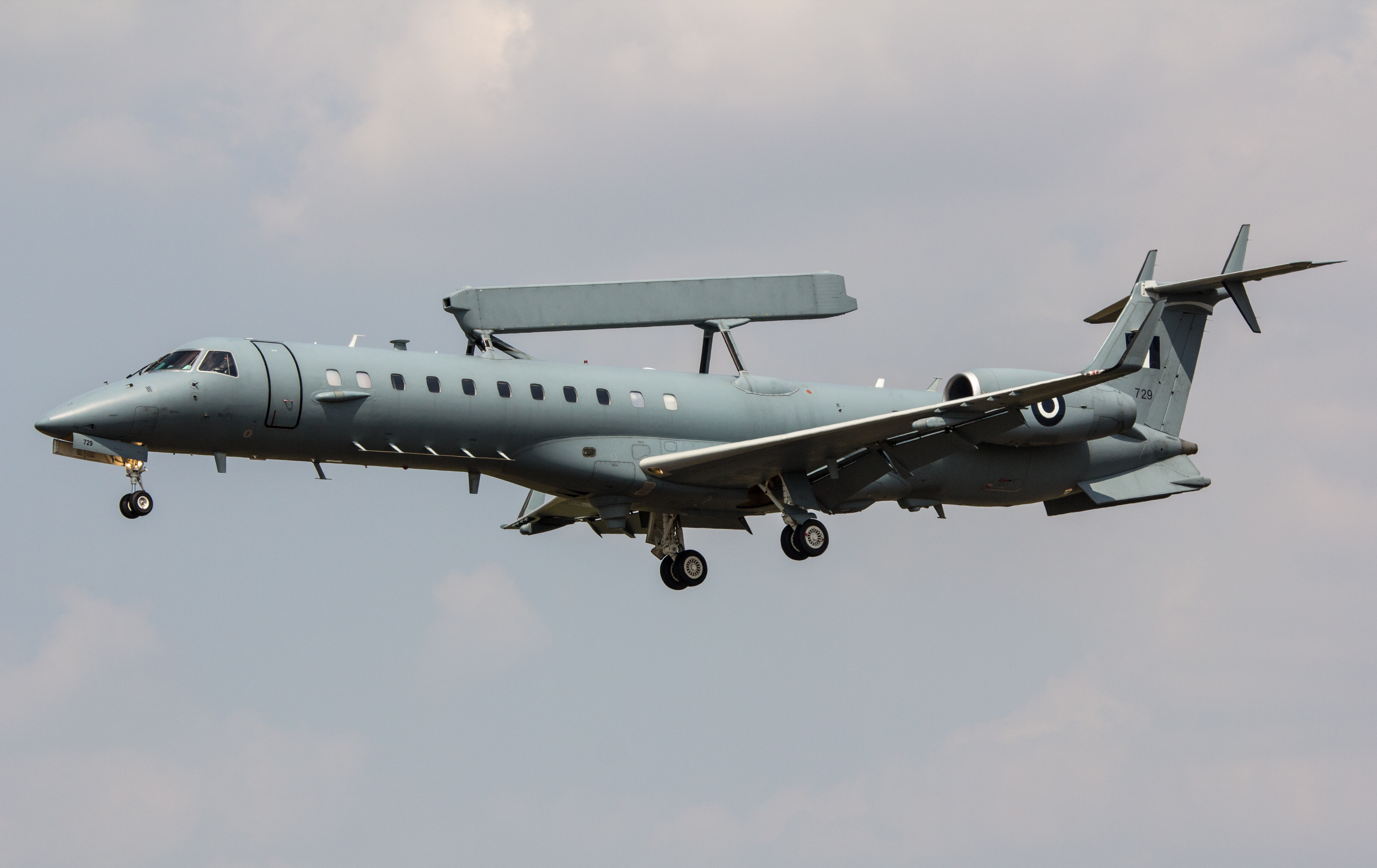
An Embraer R-99 Erieye of the Hellenic Air Force

The Erieye AEW&C mission system radar is an active, phased-array, pulse-doppler sensor that can feed an onboard operator architecture or downlink data, via an associated datalink subsystem, to a ground-based air defence network. The system employs a large aperture, dual-sided antenna array housed in a dorsal 'plank' fairing. The antenna is fixed. The beam is electronically scanned, which provides for improved detection and significantly enhanced tracking performance, compared with radar-dome antenna systems.

Erieye detects and tracks air and sea targets out to the horizon, and sometimes beyond this due to anomalous propagation — instrumented range has been measured at 450 kilometres (280 mi). Typical detection range against fighter-sized targets is approximately 350 kilometres (220 mi), in a 150° broadside sector, both sides of the aircraft. Outside these sectors, performance is reduced in forward and aft directions.

Other system features include: adaptive waveform generation (including digital, phase-coded pulse compression); signal processing and target tracking; track while scan (TWS); low side lobe values (throughout the system's angular coverage); low- and medium-pulse repetition frequency operating modes; frequency agility; Air-to-air and sea surveillance modes; and target radar cross-section display.

The radar operates as a medium- to high-PRF pulse-Doppler, solid-state radar, in E/F-band (3 GHz), incorporating 192 two-way transmit/receive modules that combine to produce a pencil beam, steered as required within the operating 150° sector each side of the aircraft, one side at a time. It is understood that Erieye has some ability to detect aircraft in the 30° sectors fore and aft of the aircraft heading, but has no track capability in this sector.

=== Variants ===
==== Erieye ====
The Erieye mission system uses the PS-890 radar. The radar is of the AESA type, and the transceiver modules are made with GaAs semi-conductors (gallium arsenide).

The variants of the Erieye include:

- The Fairchild Swearingen Metroliner was used as the testbed of the Erieye system.
- The Saab 340 AEW which exists in multiple sub-variants, and was introduced in 1997.
  - The Saab 340B AEW is designated FSR 890, and was known as the S 100B Argus in the Swedish Air Force. It entered service in 1997. It was a simple radar aircraft transmitting data to the STRIL (Stridsledning och luftbevakning) combat control and air surveillance system.
  - The Saab 340B AEW&C-300 is designated ASC 890 and was known as the S 100D Argus in the Swedish Air Force. It is the result of a modernisation of 2 S100B of the Swedish Air Force for multi-national operations. This modernisation enables the Erieye system to become a command and control aircraft, and to become compatible with NATO aircraft. Those became equipped with 3 mission consoles.
- The Embraer E-99 is used by several air forces, and is based on the Embraer ERJ 145 regional commercial jet.
- The Saab 2000 AEW&C is based on the Saab 2000 turboprop regional aircraft. All the aircraft used were already used in civilian airlines, and repurposed as military aircraft.

==== Erieye ER ====
The Erieye ER is the latest version of the radar and mission system. The radar is also of the AESA type, but the transceiver modules are made with GaN semi-conductors (gallium nitride).

This radar system is used with:

- The GlobalEye had its maiden flight in 2018, and was introduced in service in 2020. It is based on the Bombardier Global 6000 long-range business jet. It is designated as the S106 in the Swedish Air Force. On top of the Erieye ER, the GlobalEye is equipped with a FLIR Systems Star Safire 380HD, and a Leonardo Seaspray 7500E surface surveillance radar.
- The Embraer E-99M had its maiden flight in 2019, and it is in service since 2020. The aircraft is the Embraer ERJ 145 regional commercial jet.

== Operators ==
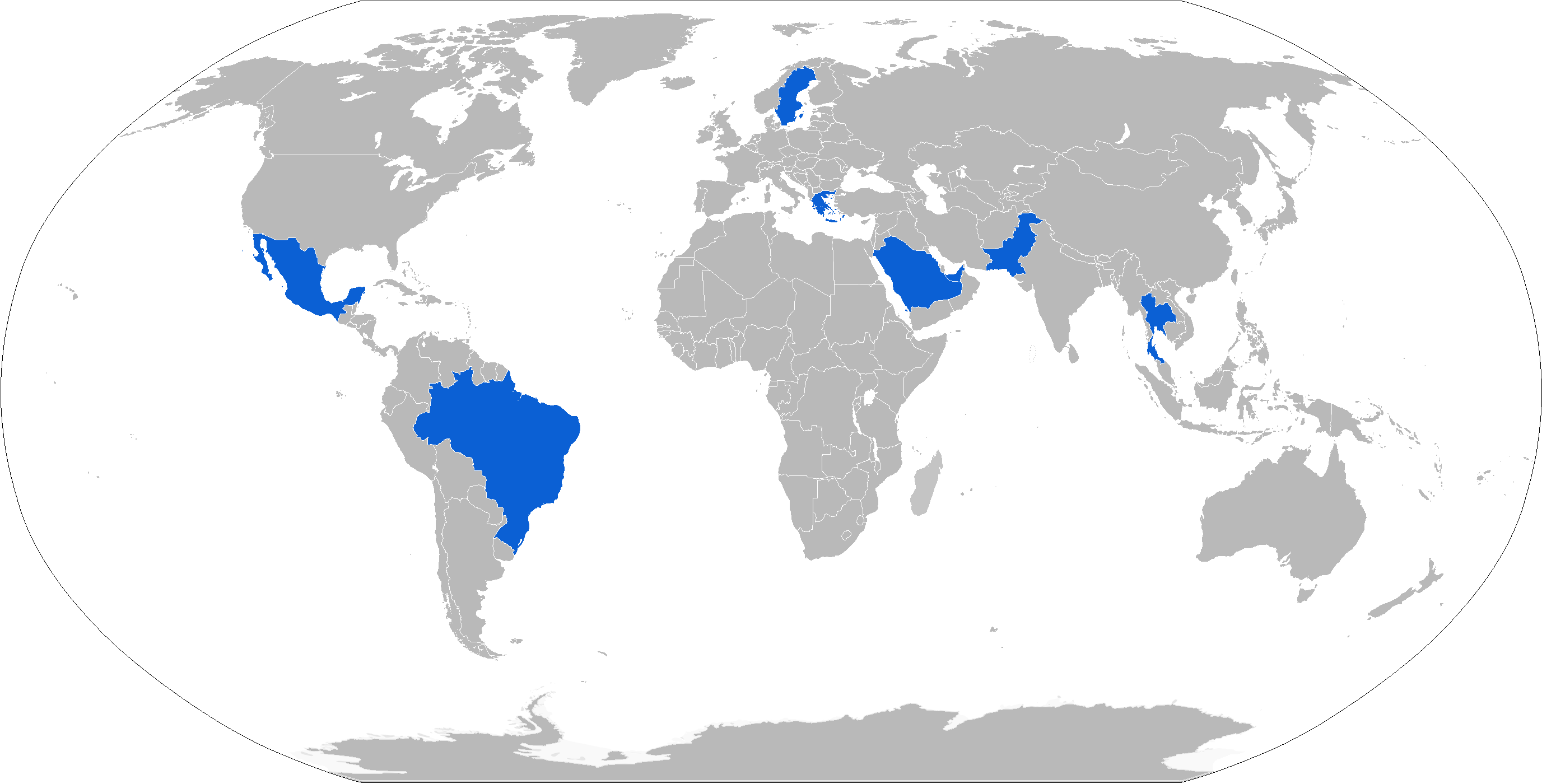
A map with Saab Erieye operators in blue

=== Current operators ===
==== Saab 340 AEW ====
Poland (2 Saab 340B AEW)
The Polish Air Force purchased two third-hand Saab 340B AEW from Saab in 2023 for €52 million. The two aircraft were delivered in 2024.
These aircraft were initially owned by Sweden, then the United Arab Emirates. When the UAE purchased additional GlobalEye, it was decided to return the aircraft to Saab, and it was done in 2020.
Thailand (2 FSR 890)
The Royal Thai Air Force purchased two second-hand Saab 340B AEW (FSR 890) from the Swedish Air Force. They were delivered in 2010 and 2013, respectively.
In March 2024, Thailand unveiled a wish list, among others, a modernised Erieye was part of it. In June 2025, in parallel to the decision to purchase the Gripen E/F, Thailand announced its willingness to modernise their Erieye for a value of US$140 million.
Sweden (2 ASC890)
Six Saab 340B AEW (FSR 890 / S 100B Argus) were ordered by the Swedish Armed Forces in 1992, four that were permanently equipped with an Erieye mission radar, and two that would perform transport mission in peace time. Saab modernised two of the 6 aircraft to the standard ASC890 (S100D), they entered service in 2010.
The Air Force sold two aircraft FSR 890 to the UAE Air Force, and two of those were delivered in 2010 and 2013 to Thailand..
In May 2024, Sweden approved the export of the two ASC890 to Ukraine. As of 2024-2025, 1 ASC890 is used for surveillance missions, and another aircraft will be used to train the Ukrainian Air Force prior to its delivery.
Ukraine (2 ASC890 pending delivery)
In May 2024, Sweden approved the export of the two ASC890 to Ukraine.

==== Saab 2000 AEW ====
Pakistan (9)
9 in service (as of 2026). Six to eight ordered around 2006; the order was reduced to four with deliveries in 2009 and 2010. Another three were ordered around 2017 and delivered from 2020 to 2024.
Saudi Arabia (8)
8 in service (as of 2025). Two ordered in 2010; aircraft were converted from second-hand transport aircraft and delivered in 2014.

==== Embraer E-99 ====
Brazil (5 E-99M)
Five ERJ-145 AEW are in service with the Brazilian Air Force as of 2025.
Brazil initially purchased 5 Erieye radar and mission systems, delivered between July 2002 and December 2003.
They were modernised with the Erieye-ER radar and mission system, and are now known as the Embraer E-99M.
Greece (4 E-99)
Four ERJ-145 AEW were delivered to Greece between December 2003 and May 2005. They remain in service with the Hellenic Air Force as of 2025. They use the Erieye radar and mission system.
Mexico (1 E-99)
One ERJ-145 AEW was delivered in June 2004, and remains in service with the Mexican Air Force as of 2025. It uses the Erieye radar and mission system.

==== GlobalEye ====
United Arab Emirates (5 in service)
The UAE operates 5 GlobalEye.
Orders:
- 3 ordered in 2015 for $1.27 billion, the contract includes an option for 2 additional aircraft
- 2 ordered formally in January 2021 for a value of around US$1 billion. The intention to validate the option was already announced in November 2019.
Deliveries:
- 1st delivered in April 2020
- 2nd delivered in September 2020
- 3rd delivered in February 2021
- 4th delivered in April 2024
- 5th delivered in August 2024

=== Future operators ===
==== GlobalEye ====
France (2 ordered)
The French Air Force ordered 2 GlobalEye in December 2025, with deliveries planned for 2029-2032.
Sweden (3 ordered)
The FMV ordered two aircraft in June 2022 for a value of SEK 7.3 billion (US$710 million in June 2022). The contract also contains options for two additional aircraft.
An option was exercised in June 2024 for one additional GlobalEye, the contract is estimated at SEK 2.6 billion (around US$240 million in June 2024).
In October 2024, the FMV signed a new contract to accelerate the delivery of the GlobalEye as Sweden decided to supply the ASC 890 to Ukraine.
Unknown client (2 ordered)
A Middle-Eastern client ordered 2 GlobalEye in July 2026 (SEK 10.1 billion).

=== Former operators ===
==== Saab 340 AEW ====
United Arab Emirates
The UAE ordered two Saab 340 AEW in 2009 for 1.5 billion SEK that were formerly in the Swedish Air Force.

== Sources ==
- The International Institute for Strategic Studies (2026). The Military Balance 2026. London: Routledge. ISBN 978-1-003-77897-4.
