= GlobalEye =

Swedish early warning aircraft

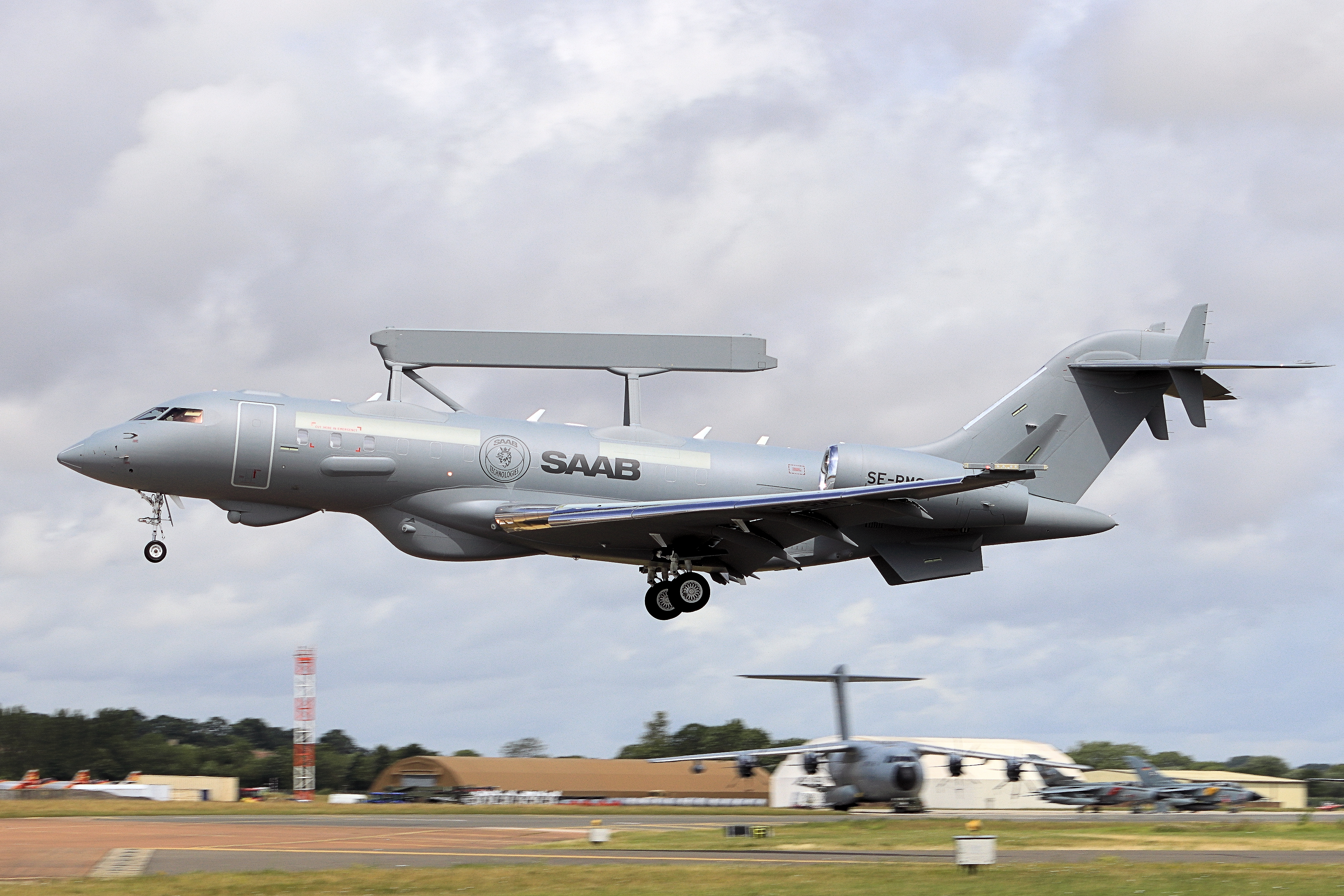
- A Globaleye taking off during RIAT 2023

General information
- Type: Airborne early warning and control (AEW&C)
- National origin: Sweden/Canada
- Manufacturer: SAAB (Sensors & modifications); Bombardier (Global 6000 aircraft)
- Status: In service
- Primary users: United Arab Emirates Air Force Swedish Air Force
- Number built: 5 (+7 on order)

History
- Introduction date: April 2020
- First flight: March 2018
- Developed from: Bombardier Global 6000 (aircraft); Erieye (AEW&C radar system)

The Saab GlobalEye is a multi-role airborne early warning & control (AEW&C) platform from Swedish defence and security company Saab. In service since April 2020, GlobalEye consists of a suite of sensors using Saab's Erieye ER (Extended Range) radar and mission system, installed in the Bombardier Global 6000/6500 long-range business jet.

== Development ==
In February 2016, Swedish defence company Saab announced the launch of a programme to integrate a variant of their Erieye radar system upon the Canadian Bombardier Global 6000, a long range business jet, to produce a specialised airborne early warning & control (AEW&C) aircraft. This platform is commonly referred to as GlobalEye. Saab stated that the launch was in response to expressions of interest from potential customers.

Prior to the development of the GlobalEye, Saab had fitted the Erieye onto several separate AEW platforms, including the Swedish Saab 340 AEW&C and the Brazilian Embraer R-99. To facilitate the programme, Saab secured a supplemental type certificate, authorising the modification of the existing Global 6000 to the GlobalEye configuration.

The manufacturing process involves the delivery of completed Global 6000s to Saab's facility in Linköping, where they undergo an extensive conversion process. Modifications include the strengthening of both the airframe and wing, enabling the carriage of the Erieye radar, along with other sensors and wingtip-mounted equipment for electronic warfare purposes. Aerodynamic changes include the adoption of an extended tailfin, along with several ventral strakes located beneath the rear fuselage. Additional power and cooling equipment is fitted. To improve survivability, a self-protection suite comprising laser and radar warning receivers, as well as countermeasures dispensers, is installed. In early 2018, Saab observed that it could produce up to three GlobalEyes per year, and could begin deliveries within three years of receiving a contract.

On 23 February 2018, Saab unveiled the first GlobalEye surveillance aircraft. Days later, it began ground testing in advance of the type's first flight. On 14 March 2018, the first GlobalEye conducted its maiden flight from Linköping. Flown by Saab experimental test pilot Magnus Fredriksson, this first flight lasted for 1 hour and 46 minutes. By July 2018, the flight test programme was focused on expanding the aircraft's flight envelope. According to Saab's vice-president of airborne surveillance systems Lars Tossman, the first aircraft was being flown "more or less every day", and that no surprises had been uncovered during these flights. In January 2019, the second aircraft performed its first flight. In May 2019, it neared the end of the flight testing phase relating to certification.

== Design ==
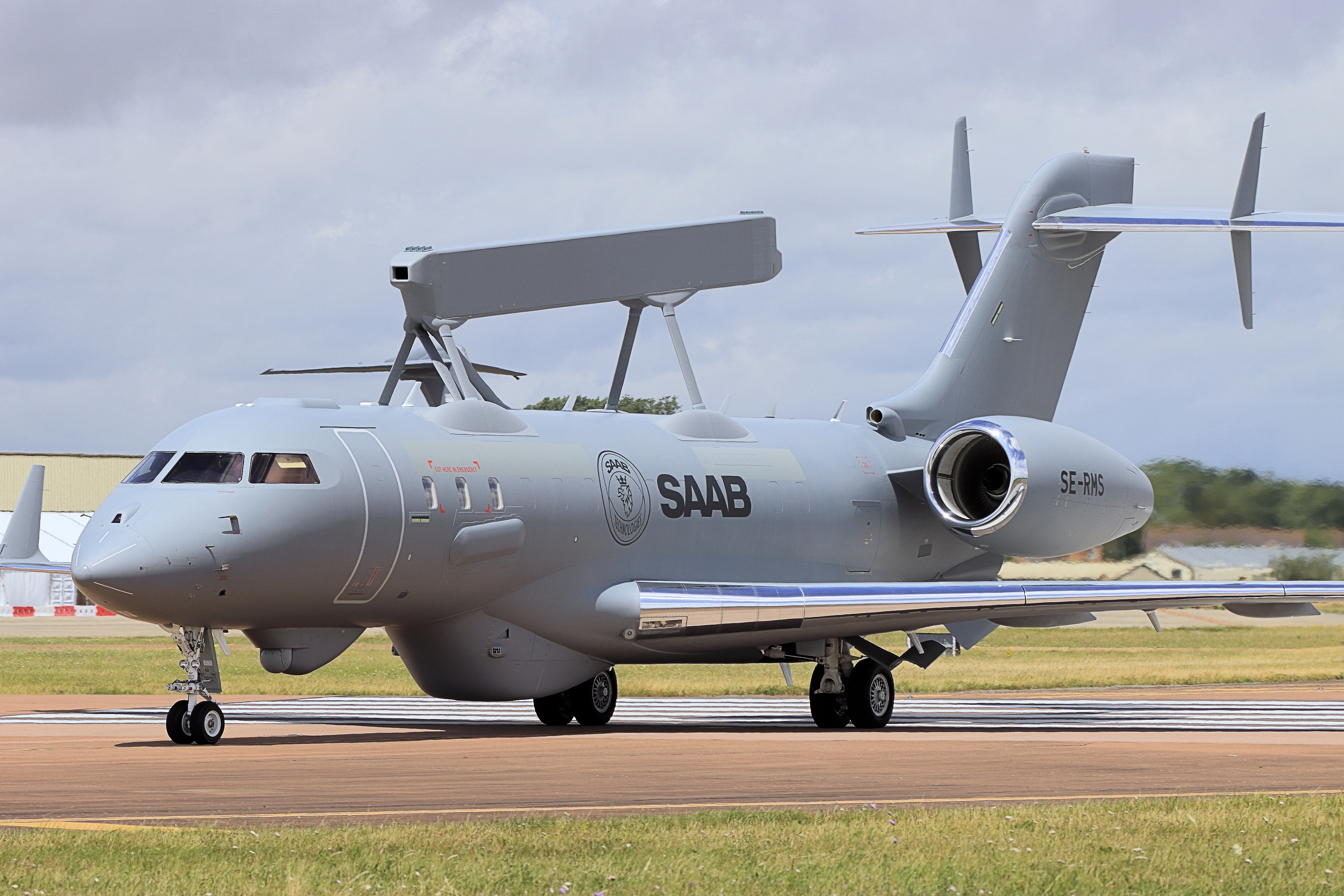
Saab Globaleye AEW&C aircraft lined up on a runway

The primary sensor of the GlobalEye is its Erieye ER airborne early warning (AEW) radar. Weighing approximately 1 tonne, it is mounted atop the twinjet's fuselage. Saab has cited up to 450 km (216 nm) range for the AEW radar system when flown at an operating altitude of 30,000 ft, and 550 km (297 nm) at 35,000 ft. It offers coverage in the 300-degree range, with addition fore and aft-facing radar sets available for customers that require 360-degree radar coverage. In comparison with earlier versions of the Erieye radar, Saab claims it has achieved a 70% increase in detection range, achieved via the use of new technology, such as gallium nitride transmit/receive modules. According to Saab Group, the GlobalEye is capable of detecting and tracking a combination of airborne and surface targets, the latter on both land and sea, while mission times of up to eleven hours in duration are possible.

In addition to the AEW radar, the GlobalEye is equipped with additional sensors. These include the British Seaspray 7500E maritime surveillance radar, provided by Italian defence conglomerate Leonardo. The Seaspray radar features synthetic-aperture radar and ground-oriented moving target indication modes. The GlobalEye also has an electro-optical/infrared sensor, which is situated underneath the forward fuselage. Together with the dorsal AEW radar, these sensors provide the Globaleye with 360-degree coverage. Other mission equipment includes data links, voice and satellite communications and a command and control suite, the latter comprising five onboard operator stations.

The GlobalEye can be operated without any onboard operators, streaming its surveillance output to ground-based stations instead. GlobalEye can simultaneously perform airborne, maritime and ground surveillance duties. It has been offered with three layers of capability: the baseline AESA and C2 system for air, land and sea surveillance, along with some electronic intelligence functions; a version with additional infrared and sea-search functionality; and one with a dedicated signals intelligence (SIGINT) system.

== Variants ==
Global 6000
The first GlobalEye built were based on the Bombardier Global 6000. The United Arab Emirates and Sweden both used newly built Global 6000 aircraft
Global 6500
Bombardier developed an evolution of the Bombardier Global 6000—the Global 6500—which is equipped with a new engine (Rolls-Royce Pearl 15), an optimised wing and an improved avionics. The changes enable a 10% higher top speed and 10% longer range for the base platform. Bombardier stopped producing the earlier variant and shifted to the Global 6500 in the early 2020s, so entirely new-built GlobalEye aircraft will be based on the Global 6500.

== Operational history ==
=== United Arab Emirates ===
In November 2015, the United Arab Emirates ordered the system, which it refers to as the Swing Role Surveillance System (SRSS), as part of a US$1.27 billion deal. In February 2017, the UAE exercised an option to procure an additional third GlobalEye in a deal worth US$238 million. According to UAE air force chief Ibrahim Naser Al Alawi, the GlobalEye should be a "strong force multiplier...an early warning radar which is capable also of detecting ballistic missiles, and to cover the whole domain as an air power".

By May 2019, lead elements, including ground control stations, had been delivered to the UAE. The UAE took delivery of its first GlobalEye per schedule in April 2020 the second delivery in September 2020, and the third delivery in February 2021. In January 2021, Saab announced that it had received a follow on contract from the UAE for the supply of two more GlobalEye systems, valued at USD $1.018 billion. In September 2024 Saab announced that the fifth and final GlobalEye had been delivered to the UAE Air Force.

== Operators ==
=== Current operators ===
United Arab Emirates (5 in service)
Variant: Global 6000
The United Arab Emirates Air Force operates 5 GlobalEye aircraft which were delivered between 2020-2024 at a total cost of SEK 23 billion.
Orders:
- 2 in 2016
- 1 in 2017
- 2 in 2021

=== Future operators ===
France (2 on order, 2 in option)
Variant: Global 6500
On 18 June 2025, during the Paris Air Show Saab and the Direction générale de l'armement (DGA) signed a joint declaration of intent for the future acquisition of two GlobalEye with options for two additional aircraft. The contract for two Globaleye is planned to be finalised sometime in the following months.
A firm order of two aircraft was placed in December 2025 with deliveries planned for 2029-2032. The contract also included an option to procure up to two additional aircraft.
Sweden (3 on order, 1 in option)
Variant: Global 6000
The Swedish Defence Materiel Administration (FMV) signed a contract with SAAB for the acquisition of two GlobalEye aircraft in June 2022 for a value of SEK7.3 billion (USD $710 million). The contract also included the option to procure up to two additional GlobalEye aircraft.
In June 2024 FMV exercised the option for a third GlobalEye aircraft to help replace the two Saab 340 AEW&C donated to Ukraine.
In October 2026 one aircraft was handed over to the Swedish Air Force and designated S 106. The aircraft will undergo testing before joining the service.
Unknown Middle Eastern country (2 on order)
On 27 July 2026, Saab announced that an order worth SEK 10.1 billion (€910 million) for two Saab GlobalEye aircraft has been received from a Middle Eastern country. The deliveries are expected in 2030.

=== Potential operators ===
Canada (6 planned)
The aircraft was presented to Canada at CANSEC 2025.
Canada chose the GlobalEye in May 2026 and opened negotiations for the purchase of 6 aircraft for the Royal Canadian Air Force. A non-binding letter of intention for six aircraft was signed in September 2026.
Denmark and Finland
Finland in 2024 revealed it was considering seconding staff to the Swedish GlobalEye unit with a view to a future purchase if funding becomes available.
In January 2025 Swedish Minister for Defence Pål Jonson stated that discussions were ongoing for a potential joint purchase of GlobalEye with both Denmark and Finland.
In April 2025, the Swedish Parliament Riksdagen approved a proposal to support selling up to 4 GlobalEye units to Denmark. The Danish Defense Minister Troels Lund Poulsen confirmed that the GlobalEye was being considered as a "relevant opportunity for Denmark".
Finland
Finland has voiced interest in buying one GlobalEye aircraft, but may also or instead operate the GlobalEye as part of a shared Nordic fleet.
Egypt
As of September 2025, Egypt is negotiating the acquisition of the GlobalEye.
Germany
As of September 2025, Germany is interested in an unspecified number of aircraft. During a meeting with Swedish Defense Minister Pål Jonson in Berlin, German Defense Minister Boris Pistorius said that Saab's bid is in a "pole position".
Greece
Presented by SAAB to the Hellenic Air Force as a replacement for its existing Erieye fleet.
Netherlands (1 planned)
The Netherlands signed a letter of intent with Sweden on 10 September 2026 for the purchase of one GlobalEye aircraft.
The aircraft would be delivered in 2031, and the Netherlands would collaborate with the Swedish Air Force GlobalEye fleet from 2028.
Qatar
The GlobalEye was offered to Qatar in November 2025.
Saudi Arabia
The GlobalEye was presented to Saudi Arabia officials during a state visit in Sweden, which might indicate an interest in the platform.
NATO (10 planned)
Loss of the first competition to replace the E-3 Sentry:
- February 2023, SAAB responded to a RFI from the NSPA (NATO Support and Procurement Agency) regarding the replacement of the E-3 Sentry fleet of the NAEW&CF programme (NATO Airborne Early Warning & Control Force) that includes many NATO nations.
- In parallel, the USAF selected the Boeing E-7 Wedgetail to replace its own fleet of E-3 Sentry in February 2023.
- In November 2023, the NSPA decided to procure 6 E-7 Wedgetail, and would therefore not purchase the GlobalEye.
Cancellation of the E-7 Wedgetail purchase:
- In June 2025, the USAF announced it would cancel the E-7 Wedgetail procurement in its 2026 budget. The Air Force is exploring alternative solutions because it considers traditional AEW&C aircraft too vulnerable.
- August 2025, NATO decides to reevaluate the E-7 Wedgetail purchase amidst the USAF cancellation and in November cancels the E-7 acquisition.
GlobalEye wins the second round for the new NAEW&CF programme:
- NATO is looking for an AEW&C aircraft as of November 2025, and the GlobalEye is one potential candidate.
- In July 2026, at the NATO summit in Ankara, NATO selects the GlobalEye and announces opening negotiations with Saab for 10 aircraft. The 11 Allies participating in this programme are Belgium, Canada, Denmark, Germany, Latvia, Lithuania, Luxembourg, the Netherlands, Norway, Romania, and Sweden.

=== Failed bids ===
Finland
In 2020, Saab was offering two GlobalEye aircraft in addition to 64 Gripen E/F as part of its bid for the Finnish HX Fighter Program. From 30 January to 6 February 2020 GlobalEye participated in HX Challenge flight evaluations, flying to Finland from Linköping in Sweden, with a Finnish Air Force delegation on board.
South Korea
Saab and KAI (Korea Aerospace Industries) signed a memorandum of understanding in October 2024 for industrial cooperation and transfer of technology regarding the AEW&C II programme for the South Korean Air Force. Saab offered a unique configuration of GlobalEye, known internally as WatchEye, fitted with an additional fore and aft X-band radar, to provide a full 360° field of regard. In September 2025, South Korea selected the Phoenix by L3Harris fitted with the EL/W-2085 radar by Elta.
