= PAF Base Bholari =

Military airbase in Sindh, Pakistan

PAF Base Bholari
- پی اے ایف بیس بھولاری
- Bholari, Jamshoro District, Sindh in Pakistan
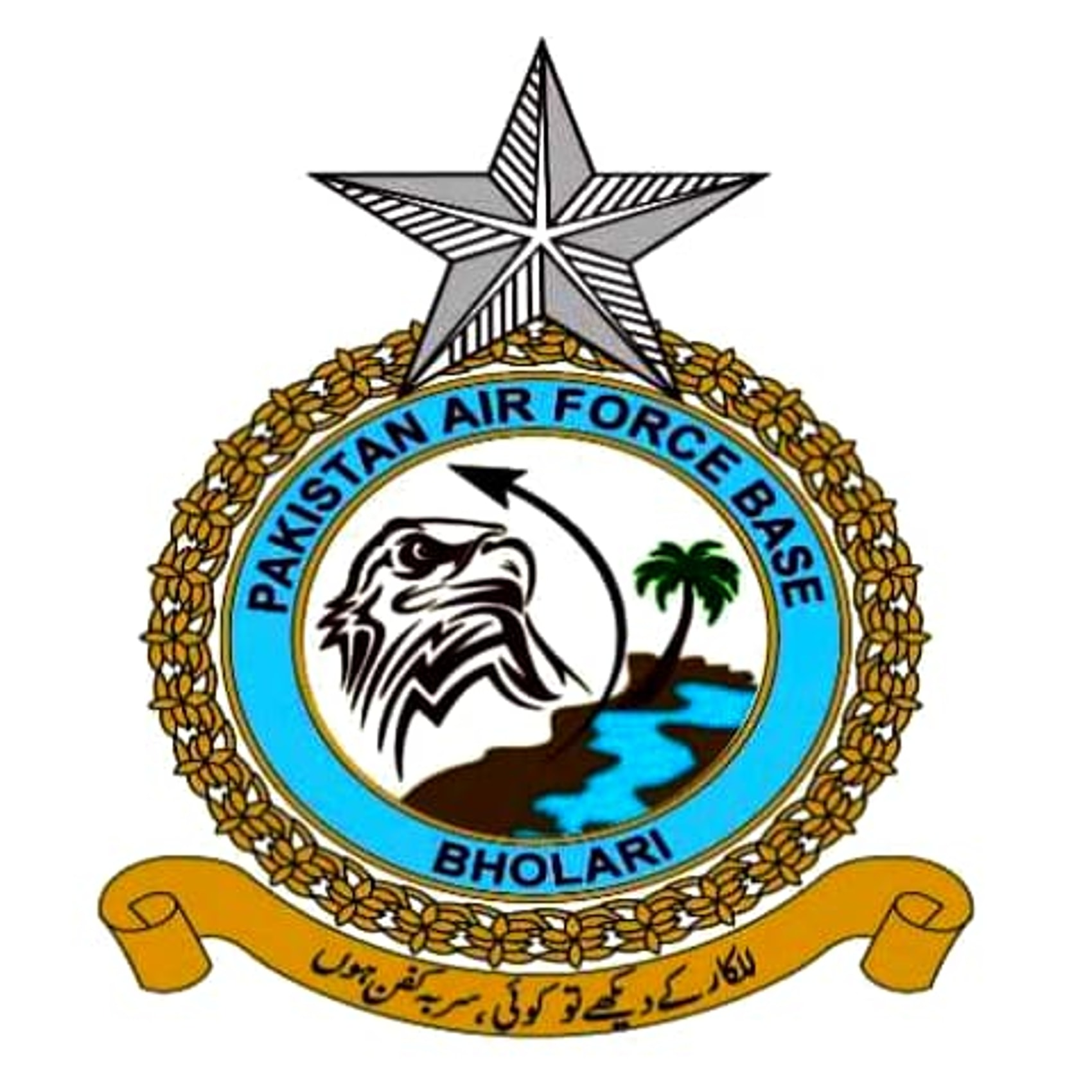

Site information
- Type: Air Force base
- Code: PK-0070
- Owner: Ministry of Defense
- Operator: Pakistan Air Force
- Controlled by: Southern Air Command
- Condition: Operational
- Website: Pakistan Air Force

Location
- Shown witih Sindh PAF Base Bholari (Pakistan)
- Coordinates: 25°14′35″N 68°02′11″E

Site history
- Built: 1942 & 2015
- Built for: British India; Pakistan Air Force
- Built by: British Raj (foundation) (Sindh) Bholari Development Board (later upgradation)
- Architect: Project Bholari
- In use: 1942-1945; 2015-Present
- Battles/wars: Operation Swift Retort; 2025 India-Pakistan conflict

Garrison information
- Garrison: 41 Tactical Wing
- Occupants: 18 OCU "Sharp Shooters"; 19 OCU "Sherdils"; 53 AEW&C Squadron "Hawks"

Airfield information
- Identifiers: IATA: none, ICAO: none
Runways
| Direction | Length and surface |
|---|---|
| 04R/22L | 3,365 metres (11,040 ft) Asphalt |
| 04L/22R | 3,365 metres (11,040 ft) Asphalt |

PAF Base Bholari is a Main operating base (MOB) of the Pakistan Air Force located at Bholari north-east of Karachi in Sindh and is home to the 41st Wing. Inaugurated in late 2017, the installation is PAF's newest airbase which is controlled by the Southern Air Command and supports operations of the armed forces in the southern regions with an additional task to safeguard the China–Pakistan Economic Corridor.

== History ==
During the Second World War, the British Raj constructed an airfield near the small town of Bholari for wartime emergencies. This airfield was inherited by the Royal Pakistan Air Force after independence of Pakistan in 1947. Even though for the next couple of decades, it remained unused and existed as a satellite base, the PAF valued its strategic location as it believed it would enhance its operational capabilities in supporting the wartime operations of the Pakistan Armed Forces in southern regions both on land and sea. Accordingly, Air Headquarters (AHQ) conceived the idea of transforming Bholari into a Main Operating Base for fighter squadrons in November 1979. However, the lack of funding prevented the plan from materializing.

By July 2014, the raging war on terror and changing Geo-political environment had raised concerns amongst the Pakistani military leadership which resulted in the direct approval of an MOB at Bholari for the PAF. Previously, AHQ had formed a council which oversaw and managed the construction of PAF Base Shahbaz codenamed "Project Shahbaz". Owing to its previous experience, Project Shahbaz was assigned with overseeing the development of the new Bholari airbase officially called "PAF Base Bholari". Project Shahbaz initiated efforts for the establishment of "Bholari Development Board" (BDB) which would oversee the legal management of the project. The proposal of BDB was approved by the Ministry of Defence in October 2015. The earth breaking ceremony took place in December 2015 and construction work finally started. The airbase was inaugurated on 25 December 2017.

In 2020, the base hosted Exercise Shaheen IX, a joint Pakistani-Chinese aerial exercise.

=== 2025 Indian missile strike ===
In May 2025, during the 2025 India–Pakistan conflict, satellite imagery published by The New York Times and The Washington Post showed damage to a hangar at the Bholari airbase. Independent analysis of the imagery indicated a large hole in the hangar roof and debris scattered around the structure, consistent with a missile impact. According to ISPR, five PAF personnel, including a squadron leader and a chief technician, were killed at the base during the strike.

The damaged hangar at Bholari is typically used to house airborne electronic warfare and jamming aircraft. The strike damaged a Saab 2000 Erieye AEW&C airborne early warning aircraft of the No. 53 Squadron PAF. India further claimed that its strikes on Bholari had destroyed several Pakistani aircraft, including F-16s and JF-17s and Indian officials released satellite imagery of the destroyed hangar as supporting evidence for these claims.The strike was conducted by an IAF strike package of Su-30MKI using Brahmos missiles. Belated repair works were underway at the base in early 2026 with the stricken hanger under reconstruction as revealed by Indian sources.

== See also ==
- List of Pakistan Air Force bases
