= Farooq Umar =

Pakistani athlete, pilot and sports administrator

Air Vice Marshal Farooq Umar HI(M) SJ SI(M) SBt TBt
- فاروق عمر
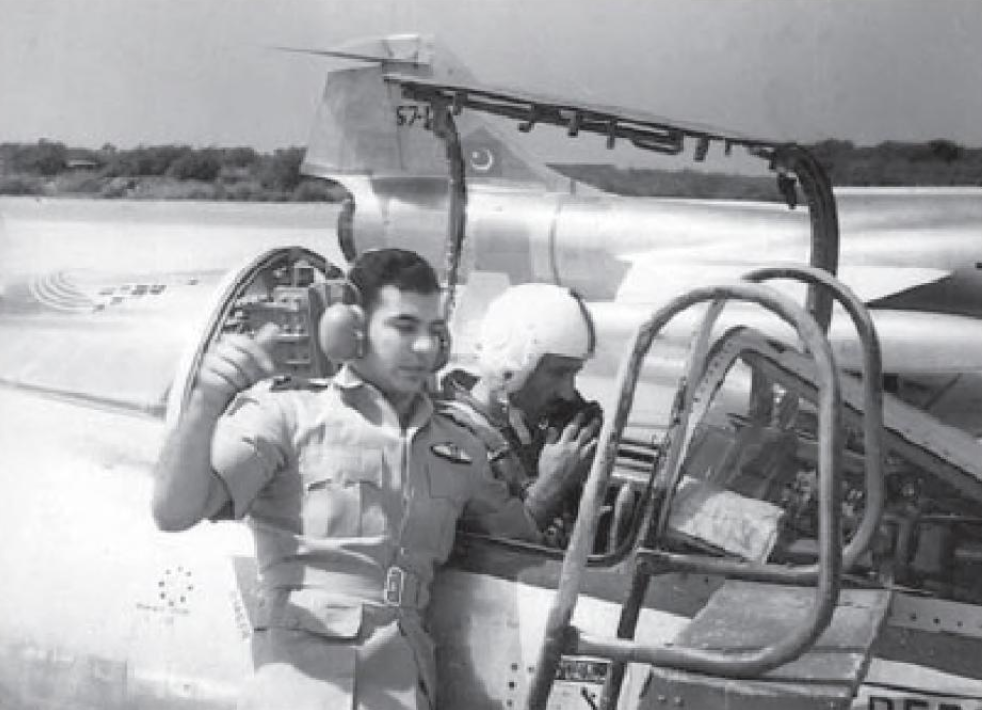
- Flight Lieut. Umar prepares Air Marshal Nur Khan for his first flight in an F-104, 1966

Managing Director Pakistan International Airlines
- In office March 1993 – 7 March 1996

Deputy Chief of the Air Staff (Electronics)
- In office March 1990 – 30 December 1992

Director General Pakistan Aeronautical Complex
- In office July 1986 – March 1990
Other commands
Commander PAF Base Faisal
In office
April 1985 – July 1986
15th Commandant PAF Staff College
In office
December 1983 – April 1985
Commander PAF Base Lahore
In office
July 1980 – June 1981
Commander Southern Sector Headquarters
Pakistan Air Force
In office
August 1979 – July 1980
Commander No. 19 Squadron PAF
In office
July 1974 – May 1977

Personal details
- Born: Muhammad Farooq Umar; 24 July 1941 (age 84) Lyallpur, Punjab Province (British India)
- Spouse: Seemeen Begum (m. 1965; died 2001)
- Children: 4
- Education: Army Burn Hall College; Central Model School, Lahore; Government College, Lahore; PAF Academy; Fighter Leaders' School, Mauripur; University of Karachi, BSc; Quaid-i-Azam University, MSc; Royal College of Defence Studies, PhD

Military service
- Branch/service: Pakistan Air Force (1960-1972; 1974-1992); Libyan Air Force (1972-1974)
- Years of service: 1960-1992
- Rank: Air Vice Marshal
- Commands: Pakistan Aeronautical Complex; PAF Base Faisal; PAF Staff College; PAF Base Lahore; No. 19 Squadron PAF
- Battles/wars: Battle at Biar Bet; Indo-Pakistani War of 1965; Indo-Pakistani Air War of 1965; Indo-Pakistani War of 1971; Yom Kippur War
- Awards: See list

Muhammad Farooq Umar (Note: Urdu: محمد فاروق عمر) (born 24 July 1941) better known as Farooq Umar, is a retired two-star rank Air Vice-Marshal of the Pakistan Air Force, fighter pilot, airline executive, and author. He served as the Managing Director of the Pakistan International Airlines and 16th President of the Pakistan Hockey Federation from 1993 to 1996.

Born in Lyallpur, Umar graduated from Government College, Lahore. He joined the PAF Academy and was commissioned into the Pakistan Air Force in 1960, after graduating at the top of his course with triple honours, including the Sword of Honour.

During the Indo-Pakistan Air War in 1965, Air Marshal Nur Khan ordered Umar to take his F-104 fighter jet to an altitude above the Indian Air Force base in Amritsar and break the sound barrier over it. Umar successfully accomplished this mission and Khan ordered him to repeat it. Soon thereafter, Indian radio channels began reporting numerous Pakistani F-86 Sabre aircraft attacking the base. These reports also noted the sound of large explosions occurring while in actuality those sounds were the two sonic booms done by Umar.

== Early life ==
Muhammad Farooq Umar was born on 24 July 1941 into an Arain Muslim family of Lyallpur. His father, Mian Muhammad Nurullah (1899-1984), was a staunch supporter of the founder of Pakistan, Quaid-e-Azam, and served as the first Finance Minister of Punjab in the cabinet of Chief Minister Iftikhar Hussain Khan Mamdot.

Farooq completed his early education at the Burn Hall School in Abbottabad and was the Captain of both the Athletics team and Cricket team. He held a record for Cycling and won many awards for the school. After graduating in 1957, he enrolled at Government College, Lahore on a sportsman's quota.

While his parents were away on Hajj, he submitted an application for selection to the Pakistan Air Force. He qualified and was then directed to appear before the Inter Services Selection Board (ISSB). His friend, "Lanky" Ahsan, who had already completed the ISSB, trained him for the tests. After successfully completing the tests, his parents discovered his secret and his father initially admonished him but ultimately agreed after understanding his son's passion for flying. He permitted him to proceed on the condition that he would finish at the top of his course.

== Personal life ==
Farooq married Seemen Begum on 6 November 1965. She was the Chairperson of the Women Sports Board of Pakistan and a philanthropist. They had four children, three daughters and one son. Seemen died in August 2001.

== Service years ==
=== Pakistan Air Force ===
Farooq Umar joined the 30th GD(P) course of the PAF Academy and became the under officer in the final term. On graduation day, 26 June 1960, he was made the parade commander and was the top graduate of his course, earning a rare feat by winning the Sword of Honour, Best Pilot's Trophy, and the Academics Trophy.

He began his training with No. 2 Sqn at Mauripur, to learn to fly the T-33 and completed his first solo flight on the jet in just ten hours of flight time, scoring 80% on his exam. He graduated from the squadron and won the Jet Conversion and All Round Best Performance trophies in 1961. He subsequently attended the Fighter Leaders School in Mauripur, where he earned the coveted top gun award and was placed on the Roll of Honour.

Upon completing his training in 1961, he was assigned to the elite No. 5 Sqn as an operational fighter pilot, which was equipped with Sabre aircraft. When the PAF received its first batch of modern F-104 Starfighters, Umar became part of a select cadre of fighter pilots assigned to fly the latest weapon system. By 1962, he transferred to No. 9 Sqn, where he served under the command of Wing Commander Jamal A. Khan. In 1964, he was selected by Air Marshal Asghar Khan, the Commander-in-Chief, to serve as his aide-de-camp.

==== 1971 War ====
The Sitara-e-Jurat citation reads:

CITATION
SQUADRON LEADER FAROOQ UMAR (PAK/4054)

"Sqn Ldr Farooq Umar was deployed on day and night air defence and reconnaissance duties during the Indo-Pak War 1971. He flew reconnaissance missions against heavily defended enemy airfields and forward army positions. He always flew with immense courage and determination. On one of his reconnaissance missions, because of a bird hit his aircraft sustained engines damage but he resolutely continued his mission and successfully completed it against a heavily defended enemy airfield. On an air defence mission, he successfully intercepted an enemy formation of Hunter aircraft and shot down/damaged four of them. The immense courage and determination displayed by him during the War was always a source of inspiration to other pilots of the Sqn. He has been awarded SJ."

==== Deputation to Libya ====
Squadron Leader Farooq Umar was sent on deputation to the Libyan Arab Republic Air Force for a two-year period from 24 February 1972 to 24 February 1974. He became the Squadron Commander of Sarb-al-Quds, a Mirage 3 Operational Training Squadron, from 1 March to 31 December 1972 and then commanded Sarb-al-Yarmuk, a Mirage 5 Operational Squadron, from 1 January to 31 December 1973.

==== Return to Pakistan ====
On his return, he served in various command and staff positions including Officer Commanding No. 19 Sqn (July 1974 to February 1977), Deputy Director Plans at Air Headquarters (AHQ), Director Flight Safety, Commander Southern Sector HQ (August 1979 to July 1980), Instructor at the National Defence College (NDC), Base Commander Lahore (July 1980 to May 1981), Commandant PAF Staff College (December 1983 to March 1985), and Base Commander Faisal (April 1985 to May 1986).

While pursuing a doctorate at the Royal College of Defence Studies in London in 1982, Farooq was the first and only Asian student who was honoured. He was also selected to give a presentation to Queen Elizabeth II and British Prime Minister Margaret Thatcher regarding "Pakistan's Importance for NATO" and "the Need for Pakistan to Rejoin the British Commonwealth."

On his promotion to Air Vice-Marshal in July 1986, he became the Director General of the Pakistan Aeronautical Complex and served until March 1990. He was then appointed Deputy Chief of the Air Staff (Electronics) for almost two years and retired in December 1992.

== Airline executive (1991-1996) ==
In 1991, Air Vice Marshal Farooq Umar was seconded to the Federal Government of Pakistan to set up Pakistan's first private cargo airline, Shaheen Air Lines, which he established within a very short period of time.

Afterwards, he became Managing Director of Pakistan International Airlines (PIA) and President of the Pakistan Hockey Federation (PHF) in March 1993. Prior to his appointment, the airline lost approximately $40 million dollars on domestic service, due to a significant increase in insurance premiums and fuel costs as a result of the Gulf War. PIA's net profit also fell to $4.5 million in the fiscal year ending 1994. A year later, the airline received record profits of $411 million on total revenue of $880 million due to the restructuring program implemented by Farooq Umar.

During his time as President of the PHF, he revitalised the team and they won both the 1994 Men's Hockey Champions Trophy and the 1994 Men's Hockey World Cup, after a 14-year stagnant period.

== Authorship ==
Air Vice Marshal (R) Farooq Umar HI(M), SJ, SI(M), S.bt, T.bt (2013). Learn The Secrets of Success.

== Awards and decorations ==
- Sword of Honour (1960)
- Best Pilot's Trophy (1960)
- Academics Trophy (1960)
- All Round Best Trophy (1960)
- Best Pilot's Award (1960)
- Sitara-e-Jurat (1971)

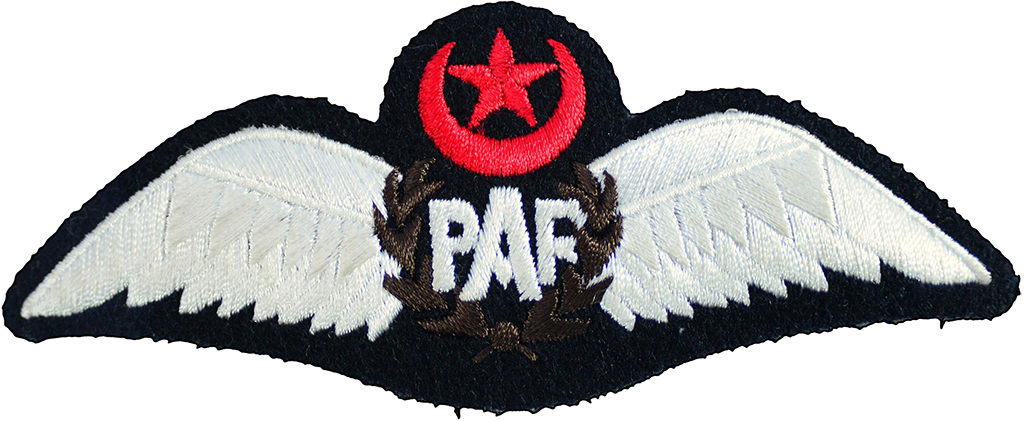

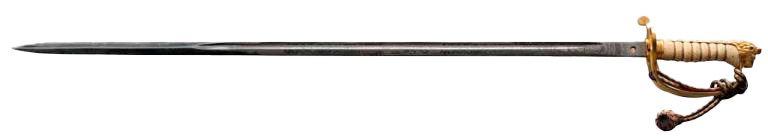

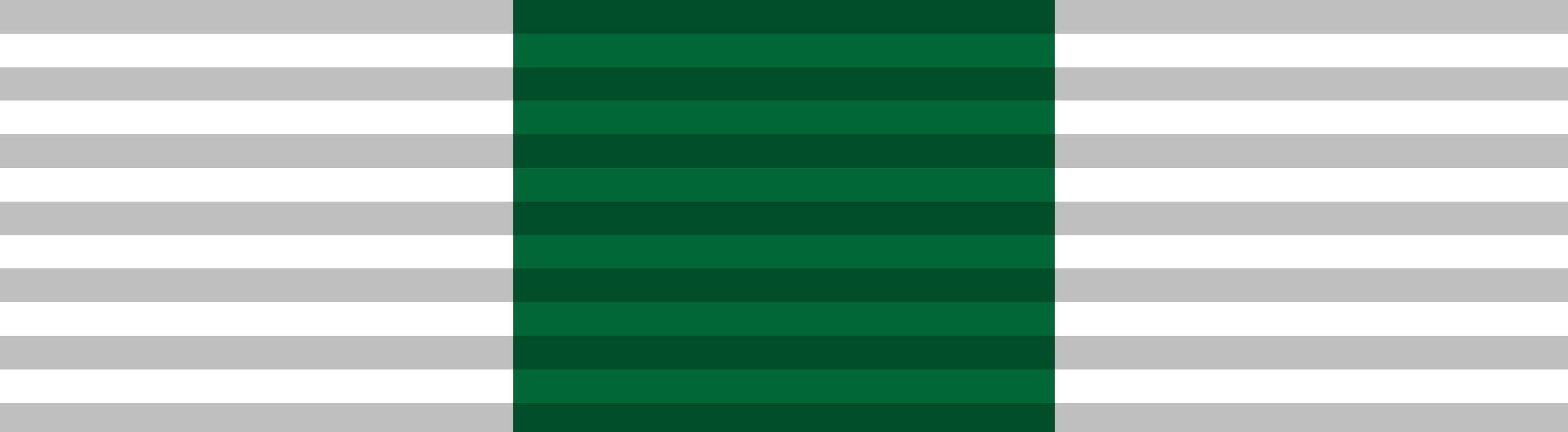
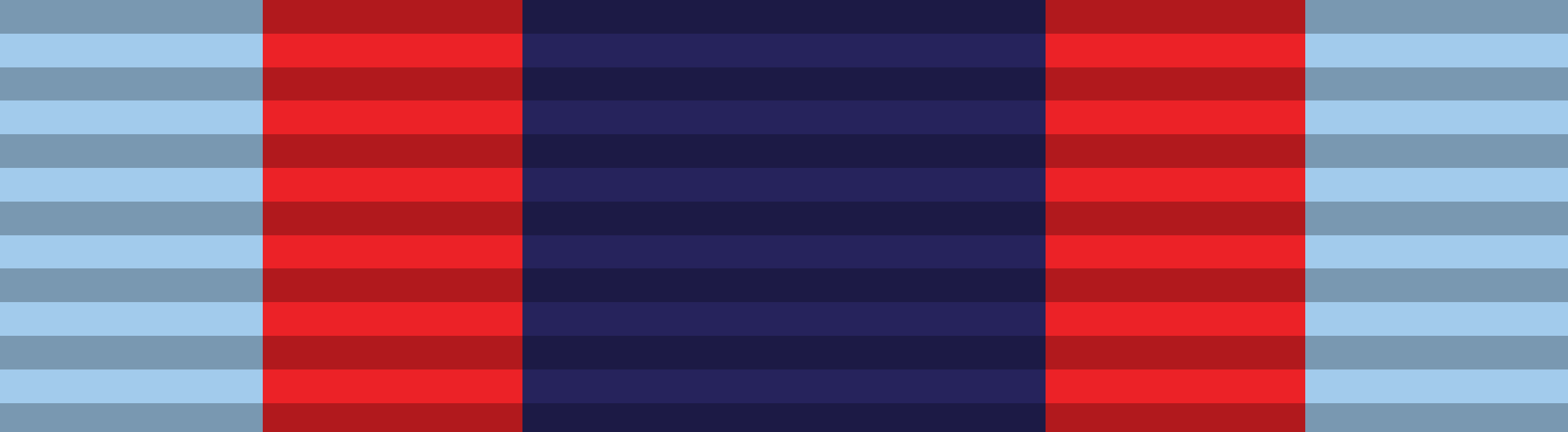

PAF GD(P) Badge RED (More than 3000 Flying Hours)
Sword of Honour (Pakistan); PAF Academy; 1960
Sitara-e-Jurat (Star of Courage); 1971	Sitara-e-Basalat (Star of Valour)		Tamgha-e-Basalat (Medal of Valour)
Tamgha-e-Diffa (Defence Medal); Kashmir 1965 Clasp; Kutch 1968 Clasp		Sitara-e-Harb 1965 War (War Star 1965)	Sitara-e-Harb 1971 War (War Star 1971)
Tamgha-e-Jang 1965 War (War Medal 1965)	Tamgha-e-Jang 1971 War (War Medal 1971)	Tamgha-e-Sad Saala Jashan-e-Wiladat-e-Quaid-e-Azam (100th Birth Anniversary of Muhammad Ali Jinnah) 1976	Hijri Tamgha (Hijri Medal) 1979
