= B. K. Dass =

Pakistani Air Commodore (1918–2002)

Air Commodore B. K. Dass SQA
- بی کے داس
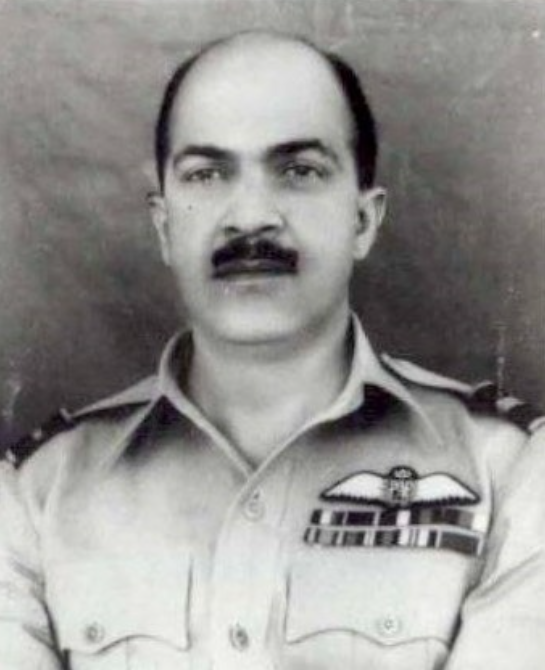
- Portrait, c. 1958

Director General, Civil Aviation and Tourism Department (Pakistan)
- In office November 1961 – 28 March 1970
- Preceded by: Abdul Qadir

6th Commandant, PAF College
- In office November 1954 – January 1958
- Preceded by: Maqbool Rabb
- Succeeded by: Khyber Khan

Commander, RPAF Station Peshawar
- In office March 1953 – November 1954

Commander, RPAF Station Lahore
- In office April 1949 – December 1950

Officer Commanding, No. 6 Squadron RPAF
- In office 1 April 1949 – 31 July 1950

Officer Commanding, No. 9 Squadron RPAF
- In office December 1947 – March 1948

Personal details
- Born: Balwant Kumar Dass; 30 April 1918 Gorakhpur, British India
- Died: 20 March 2002 (aged 83) Pakistan
- Spouse: Mavis (m. 1942)
- Children: 3
- Parent: Constance Prem Nath Dass (mother)
- Relatives: Mohini Maya Das (maternal aunt)
- Education: No. 1 (I) SFTS

Military service
- Branch/service: Royal Indian Air Force (1941–1947); Pakistan Air Force (1947–1970)
- Years of service: 1941–1970
- Rank: Air Commodore
- Commands: RPAF Station Peshawar; RPAF Station Lahore; No. 6 Squadron PAF; No. 9 Squadron PAF
- Battles/wars: World War II; Indo-Pakistani War of 1947–1948
- Awards: Sitara-e-Quaid-e-Azam (1961)

Balwant Kumar Dass (Note: Urdu: بلونت کمار داس) (30 April 1918 – 20 March 2002), better known as B. K. Dass, was a Pakistani Air Commodore and one of the pioneer officers of the Pakistan Air Force, having previously served in the Royal Indian Air Force. He served as Director General of Civil Aviation and Tourism in Pakistan from November 1961 to 28 March 1970, and was awarded the Sitara-e-Quaid-e-Azam in 1961. He held command of two RPAF squadrons and two stations, and served as Commandant of the PAF College from 1954 to 1958.

== Early life and education ==
Balwant Kumar Dass was born on 30 April 1918 in Gorakhpur into a Punjabi Christian family. His mother, Constance Prem Nath Dass, served as Principal of Isabella Thoburn College. His father, Prem Nath Dass (1871–1931), came from a prominent Christian family of the United Provinces of Agra and Oudh.

Dass held a Bachelor of Science degree in agriculture.

In October 1940, Dass was selected as one of ten government-sponsored trainees at the United Provinces (UP) Flying Club's Cawnpore Centre, receiving up to 30 hours of flight training funded by the UP Government and the Raja Saheb of Katiyari.

== Military career ==
=== Royal Indian Air Force ===
Dass was commissioned into the Royal Indian Air Force on 3 March 1941. During World War II, he was attached to No. 1 Sqn RIAF at Fort Sandeman in Baluchistan. He was promoted to Flying Officer on 3 September 1942 and to acting Flight Lieutenant on 10 April 1947.

=== Pakistan Air Force ===
Following the Partition of British India in August 1947, Flying Officer Dass opted for the Royal Pakistan Air Force.

In December 1947, Squadron Leader Dass was appointed Officer Commanding No. 9 Sqn. Wing Commander Dass succeeded Squadron Leader Wolanski as Officer Commanding No. 6 Sqn on 1 April 1949, serving until 31 July 1950. In April 1949, he also assumed command of RPAF Station Lahore. In 1951, Wg Cdr Dass served as Director of Operations at Air Headquarters in Karachi.

In March 1953, Dass was appointed Commander of PAF Station Peshawar. During that year, while flying from Peshawar to Lahore, he erred off course in poor visibility and made a crash landing in Amritsar. Group Captain Dass was appointed Commandant of PAF College in November 1954.

==== Director General of Civil Aviation (1961–1970) ====
In October 1963, Air Commodore Dass signed an agreement in Karachi on behalf of the Government of Pakistan with the Soviet Union to establish air services between the two countries.

In August 1965, Dass signed an agreement with the Soviet Union's Trade Commissioner in Pakistan for the purchase of machinery on credit for airport construction, valued at Rs 1.5 crore. On 27 August 1965, Air Commodore Dass and J. Falber, Director of Civil Aviation of Poland, signed a bilateral air agreement establishing services between the two countries.

== Personal life ==
Dass had five siblings. His elder brother, Amarjit Kumar Dass, retired as an Inspector General and served as the first Director General of the Uttar Pradesh Police.

Dass's engagement to Mavis (née Jacob) was announced in April 1942. Mavis was the eldest daughter of A. G. Jacob, Controller of Accounts for the Royal Indian Air Force, and Gladys M. Jacob. They married at St. Paul's Church, Ambala Cantonment, on 10 May 1942. Their first daughter was born on 18 July 1943 in Simla. Their son, Duleep, known as "Johnny" Dass, was born on 13 January 1947 at Lady Willingdon Hospital. The family also had a daughter named Anita Schwaighofer.

Duleep Dass became involved in Baloch nationalist politics and was known to the Baloch as "Dilu". While leaving Balochistan in 1975, he was betrayed by an informer and abducted near Jhatpat by Pakistani intelligence agencies. He was never seen again; according to accounts, he was tortured and killed, and his body was never found. Balwant Kumar Dass spent months in Balochistan searching for his son. Sherbaz Khan Mazari wrote that despite Dass's rank and standing, neither the army nor the intelligence agencies provided him with any help or information.

== Legacy ==
Air Marshal Asghar Khan, who served as President of Pakistan International Airlines while Dass headed Civil Aviation, described him as possessing "sterling qualities, extremely industrious and honest", while noting that he was "loyal to an unreasonable degree", "hard on Christians", and was often late to work.

Air Commodore Inamul Haque Khan recorded in his memoirs that as Commandant of the PAF College, Dass "used to blow hot and cold in the same breath and was very particular about the dress and uniform of officers".

British ornithologist Guy Mountfort, writing in The Vanishing Jungle (1969), acknowledged Dass's work in planning two World Wildlife Fund expeditions to Pakistan and described him as having treated all problems "with the utmost kindness".

Author Abdur Rahman Mian described Dass as "a gem of an officer of the Pakistan Air Force".

Cricket commentator and author Omar Kureishi described Dass as "a wonderful man and a family friend" who was "particularly close to my brother Sattoo".
