= Sargodha Airfield Complex =

Former airfield complex in Punjab, Pakistan

Sargodha Airfield Complex
- Sargodha, Punjab Province in Pakistan
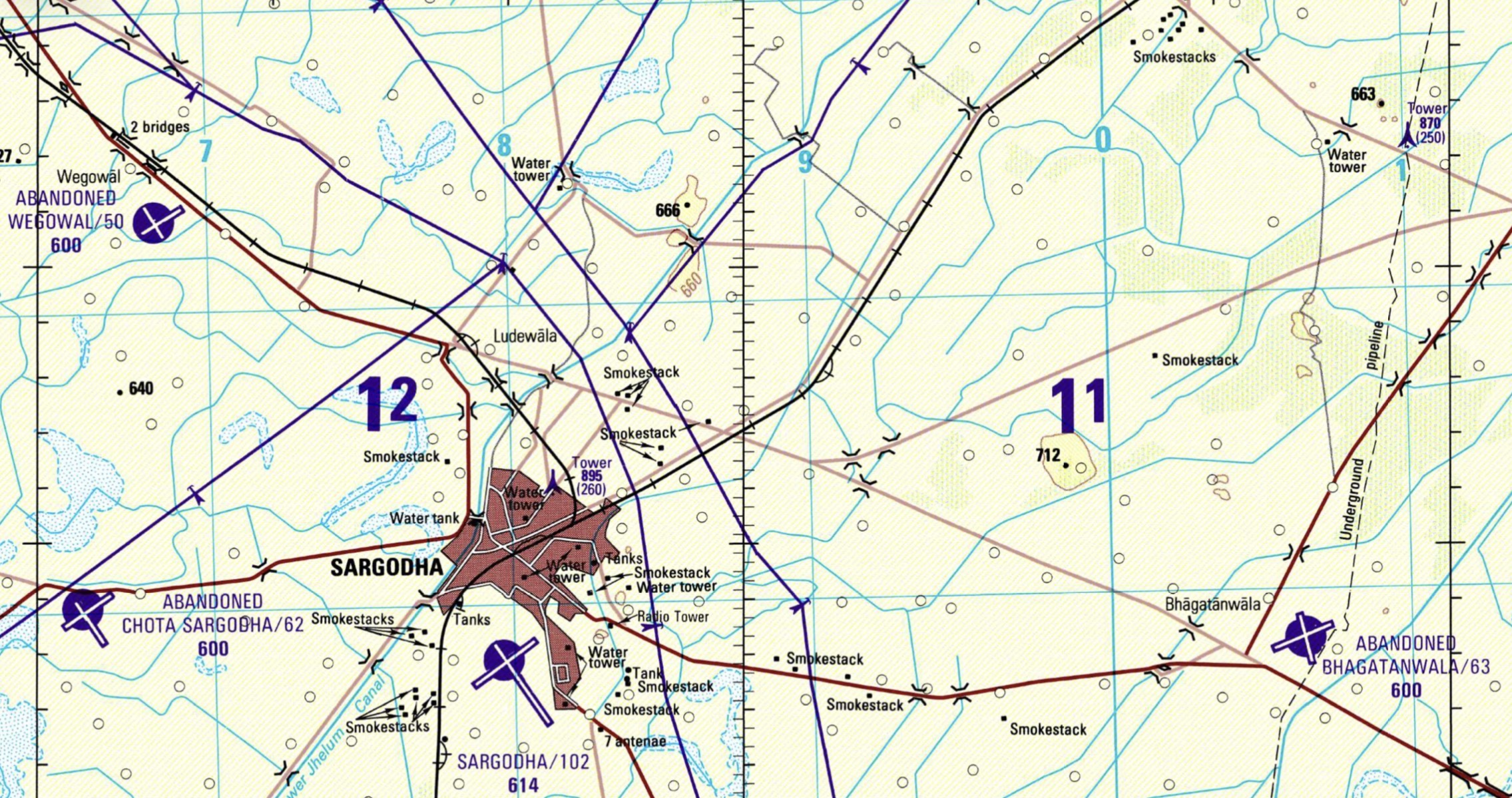
- Tactical pilotage chart of the Sargodha Airfield Complex from February 1994.

Site information
- Type: Military airfield complex
- Condition: Abandoned

Location
- Shown within Pakistan
- Coordinates: 32°2′32″N 72°40′16″E

Site history
- Built: 1942
- In use: 1942 - 1947 Royal Indian Air Force; 1947 - 1956 Royal Pakistan Air Force; 1956 - present Pakistan Air Force (until 1971 for Wagowal & Chota Sargodha)
- Battles/wars: Indo-Pakistani air war of 1965

The Sargodha Airfield Complex was a military complex belonging to the Pakistan Air Force located in Sargodha, Punjab Province in Pakistan. It comprised four permanent airfields: Sargodha Main, Chota Sargodha, Wagowal, and Bhagtanwala. It was initially established during World War II under the Defence of India Act, 1939, though partly abandoned when Pakistan gained independence in 1947. During the Indo-Pakistani air war of 1965, the complex was heavily defended by the PAF, facing aerial combat by the Indian Air Force. Currently, Sargodha Main and Bhagtanwala remained in use as Pakistan Air Force installations, while Chota Sargodha and Wagowal were abandoned.

== History ==
In 1942, four airfields were constructed in Sargodha for use during World War II, though seldom-used by the Royal Indian Air Force. Following the independence of Pakistan on 14 August 1947, many were left abandoned. Beginning in late August, a Harvard carrying an Indian Army engineer began conducting inspections of abandoned airfields between Delhi and Lahore for post-Partition emergency operations involving Douglas C-47 Skytrains. The Sargodha airfields were later brought to operational status by the Royal Pakistan Air Force, comparably to a pair of Second World War airstrips in Halwara similarly left disused. In a report from 1958, the United States Air Force (USAF) could potentially operate Douglas C-54 Skymaster, Douglas C-124 Globemaster II, North American F-100C Super Sabre, and the F100D if in an emergency, or necessary at the airstrips.

Airfields of the Sargodha Airfield Complex

=== 1965 Indo-Pakistani Air War ===
During the beginning of the India–Pakistan war in August 1965, concerns were raised that an aerial escalation would occur. Influenced by the April 1959 incursion of an IAF Canberra detected by a mobile radar at Wagowal, tensions remained moderate. At the time, the PAF had an inventory of 104 fighters and 26 bombers. Comparably, the IAF had a large inventory comprising 476 fighters and 60 bombers. Subsequently, the PAF began reactivating Bhagtanwala, Chota Sargodha, and Wagowal to disperse aircraft and increase operational effectiveness. The airfields were provided with night landing capabilities and other facilities.

According to satellite imagery dated 2024, Chota Sargodha, Wagowal, and Bhagatanwala’s runways, revetments, and circular dispersals appear to remain intact but in a state of disrepair.

== Airfields ==
The Sargodha Airfield Complex comprised four airfields, which is detailed as follows:

=== Sargodha (Main) ===
Location: Sargodha (Main) is located in the center of Sargodha at 32°2′32″N 72°40′16″E.

Sargodha (Main) operated as the principal airfield of the Sargodha Airfield Complex, housing the most operational squadrons. Following the Second World War, the disused airfield was occupied by a Care and Maintenance Party in July 1951. At the time, the airfield lacked any facilities and a control tower, nonetheless it served VIP flights including the Defence Secretary. On 1 March 1953, an RPAF Pre-Cadet School was established at Sargodha by Main Air Service Training Ltd, based in Hamble-le-Rice, Hampshire. The school produced officers and technicians, and a Pre-Apprentices School was later relocated to the airfield when accommodation was adequate. In the summer of 1956, reconstruction of Sargodha Main commenced under the United States Army Trans-East District Construction Program. Contractor Oman-Farnsworth-Wright completed construction in June 1958, extending the runway over 3,000 yards. Afterwards, it was handed over to the PAF, allowing for jet operations. By 1959, it was officially commissioned as PAF Station Sargodha.

"We then did our Basic Weapons Course on the F86 and in June 1961 I was posted to No. 5 F86 Fighter Squadron at Sargodha. Being a new base we were living in almost survival conditions initially but enjoyed every moment of it. Since I was not in the habit of afternoon naps I spent a great deal of time in the hangars working of the F86 with the maintenance crew. This not only gave me immense technical knowledge of the aircraft but also won me the respect of the Senior NCOs and Airmen."

— Group Captain Cecil Chaudhry, interviewed on June 2001

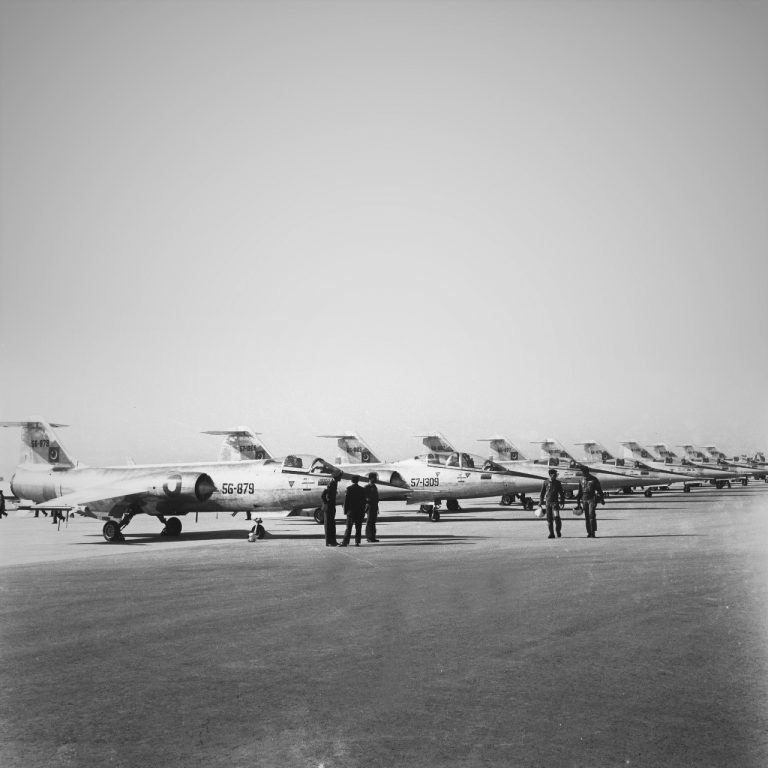
F-104As and F-104Bs of the No. 9 Squadron Griffins lined up on the tarmac at Sargodha Main.

During the 1960s, the No. 33 Fighter Wing was based at Sargodha, composing three F-86 Sabre squadrons, one F104 Starfighter squadron and one reconnaissance squadron equipped with RT-33 aircraft. The eastern and western disposal areas and pens of the airfield were bombed during the primary 7 September attacks. Following the ceasefire, on 24 November 1965, an agreement for a delivery of 72 Shenyang F-6s was established. The first batch, 31 Shenyangs were flown into the airfield on 31 December of that year. They entered service with the local No. 11 Squadron. By April 1966, Sargodha Main was equipped with two blacktop runways, one measuring 9,250 feet long and 160 feet wide, and the other measuring 6,300 feet long and 150 feet wide. Supporting the runway was a parallel taxiway, two end-connecting and two cross-over links, an alert apron, parking apron, 32 revetted hardstands, and seven hangarettes. Facilities included two hangars, up to 50 support buildings, 12 barracks, a pol storage site, and an ammunition storage site. These comprehensive features allowed Sargodha to handle the deliveries of Shenyangs and further aircraft. This would come into play in October 1968, when the first ordered Dassault Mirage IIIs became operational under the No. 5 Squadron at Sargodha, led by Wing Commander M.M. Alam. Group Captain Zafar Chaudhary was appointed Base Commander for PAF Base Sargodha in 1969. Today, it is now PAF Base Mushaf.

Units

The following units that were based at Sargodha (Main) Airfield:

- No. 11 Squadron PAF of 33 Fighter Wing between April 1960 and January 1971, returned on January 1983, equipped with 16 F-6A, commanded by Wing Commanded Sikander M. Khan
- No. 5 Squadron PAF of 33 Fighter Wing between 1961 and 1971, equipped with 17 Mirage IIIEP, three Mirage IIIRP, and three Mirage IIIDP, commanded by Wing Commander Hakimullah
- No. 9 Squadron PAF of 33 Fighter Wing between 15 September 1961 and 6 December 1971, equipped with five F-104A and two F-104B, commanded by Wing Commander Arif Iqbal
- No. 15 Squadron PAF of 33 Fighter Wing since 1961, equipped with F86s, commanded by Squadron Leader Arshad Chaudhry
- No. 20 Squadron PAF of 33 Fighter Wing since 1961, equipped with RT-33), commanded by Squadron Leader by M.M. Ahmad
- No. 25 Squadron PAF between January 1966 and 1971, equipped with 16 F-6A, commanded by Wing Commander Sa’ad A. Hatmi

=== Bhagtanwala ===
Location: Bhagtanwala Airstrip is located 28 kilometres east of Sargodha at 32°3′19″N 72°56′59″E.

Bhagtanwala Airfield operated as an emergency recovery airstrip during the 1965 air war, having the second-most importance within the complex. Its existence began amidst the Second World War, when farmland at Chak No. 24 in Janubi were temporarily requisitioned for the construction of Bhagtanwala Airfield in 1942. Two hard-surfaced runways, taxi tracks, dispersals areas, roads, and hardstands were developed afterwards under Defence of India Rules. It was originally intended to operate as a light bomber base, however it was little used throughout the war. On 4 November 1946, the District Magistrate Shahpur issued the permanent acquisition of 243 acres of the airfield. Over the following years, the airfield was retained for use under multiple requisitioning extensions. The Requisitioned Land Act on 30 March 1947 continued control of the airfield, though it was to expire in 1955. As a result, on 30 March 1955, the Requisitioning Land Ordinance was enacted. By 1971, compensation was still being arbitrated, and petitions to free the land were filed in 1989. In 1991, the Supreme Court allowed the appeals.

By 1958, Bhagtanwala Airfield was equipped with two concrete runways that can only handle fair-weather operations: 6,270 x 150 ft runway orientated NNE/SSW and 5,000 x 150 ft runway orientated NNW/SSE. The longer runway had a pavement bearing load of 28,00 lb, and the shorter runway had a load of 26,000 lb. It had no support facilities, storage for fuel, or accommodation for personnel. The airfield would receive periodical inspections, and was considered abandoned by the PAF. It was noted that it would cost 50% of the original cost to put the airfield into operable conditions.

At the start of the Indo-Pakistani air war of 1965, Bhagtanwala Airfield was unoccupied, and cattle were normally grazing there. The airfield was equipped with an Operational Readiness Platform, and also lined with decoy and dummy aircraft. This successfully drew attention of the Indian No. 8 Squadron during an attack held on 7 September 1965. Due to these circumstances, Bhagtanwala was commonly mistaken as Sargodha Main. The 199 Electrical and Mechanical Engineers Battalion established a Forward Base at the airfield, commanded by Major Aftab and Major Burki. In 1985, Bhagtanwala Airfield began operating civilian flights for Sargodha, also known as Sargodha Domestic Airport. However, due to a lack of traffic, the Aviation Division discontinued a Pakistan International Airlines service between Bhagtanwala and Rawalpindi in 1987. Afterwards, passenger usage was terminated and Bhagtanwala Airport closed, remaining as an air force installation. The subject became a matter of concern in The National Assembly of Pakistan Debates. It remained classified as a domestic Feeder Service Airport. Rapid intervention vehicles were procured for the airport in the 1990-91 Annual Plan. In 1997, the Frontier Works Organisation led the development of a new runway measuring 1,920 metres by 46 metres, headed 07/25. The airfield did not have navigation or visual aids. Currently, Bhagtanwala Airfield operates as an advance attack base.

Units

The following units that were based at Bhagtanwala Airfield:

- No. 9 Squadron PAF detachment during December 1971, equipped with five F-104A and two F-104B, commanded by Wing Commander Arif Iqbal
- No. 13 Army Aviation Squadron during 15 November 1989 for Exercise Zarb-e-Momin, having 21 aircraft and 20 pilots attached.

=== Chota Sargodha ===
Location: Chota Sargodha Airstrip is located 16.5 kilometres west from Sargodha at 32°3′41″N 72°31′4″E.

Chota Sargodha Airstrip was similarly built during World War II, although it was not revitalised to jet capabilities following partition. Due to its proximity to Sargodha Main, it was included in the complex and notable enough to be included in IAF target plans. As a result, during the September 1965 attacks, it was heavily targeted by IAF squadrons and the southeastern portion of the airfield was damaged. In 1965, an L-19 crashed over Chota Sargodha, killing two.

As of 1958, Chota Sargodha was equipped with two concrete runways that can only handle fair-weather operations: 6,300 x 150 ft runway orientated NE/SW and 5,100 x 150 ft runway orientated W/SE. Both runways had a pavement bearing load of 55,400 lb. It had no support facilities, storage for fuel, or accommodation for personnel. It was classified as a category C airfield, having runway maintenance put on furtherer notice.

On August 9, 2011, a Pakistan Air Force Mil Mi-171 made an emergency landing on the abandoned airfield during routine flight training. No injuries were reported, and the fault was due to technical issues with the tail.

=== Wagowal ===
Location: Wagowal Airstrip is located 22 kilometres north from Sargodha at 32°10′50″N 72°32′32″E.

By 1959, a Type 15 mobile radar unit was maintained at the disused Wagowal Airfield, linked to a makeshift Sector Operations Centre (SOC) in Tiwana House, Sargodha cantonment. The radar controller was Pilot Officer Rab Nawaz, while the SOC's operations officer was Flight Lieutenant A. M. Shahzada. The radar and SOC was operated by the No. 223 Squadron, commanded by Flight Lieutenant S. A. Rahman. During Eid on 10 April 1959, the radar spotted an IAF English Electric Canberra PR57 intruding into Pakistani airspace. Two F-86F Sabre jets from No. 15 Squadron PAF were scrambled from PAF Base Peshawar, successfully intercepting the Canberra. When both pilots ejected, they were captured by Pakistani authorities for interrogation before being repatriated four days later. This incident marked the first Pakistani Air Force aerial combat victory.

As of 1958, Wagowal Airfield was equipped with two concrete runways that can only handle fair-weather operations: 6,000 x 150 ft orientated NE/SW and 3,750 x 150 ft orientated NW/SE. Both runways had a pavement bearing load of 55,400 lb. It had no support facilities, storage for fuel, or accommodation for personnel.

On 7 February 2026, seven were arrested and 35 booked, including residents of Chak 123, after they stormed the airfield due to land disputes. They intruded using a tractor and three cars, breaking through a fence and threatening security personnel, damaging a vehicle.

== In popular media ==
- Sky Force (film), 2025 movie featuring Akshay Kumar, Veer Pahariya, Sara Ali Khan and Nimrat Kaur is based on Indian air raids on Sargodha airfield.

== Notes ==
- There are phonetic variations and misspellings that appear in published histories: Chota Sargodha as Chotta Sargodha, Wagowal as Wegowal, Bhagtanwala as Bhagatanwala or Baghtanwala.

== See also ==
- PAF Base Mushaf
