= Exercise Shaheen =

Military exercises held 2011–2021

Exercise Shaheen شاہین فضائی مشق
- Status: In-Active
- Genre: Military exercise
- Frequency: Annual
- Venue: Airbases of China and Pakistan
- Country: Pakistan; China
- Years active: 15
- Inaugurated: March 11, 2011
- Founder: Ministry of Defence; Ministry of National Defense
- Most recent: 5 June 2021
- Participants: Pakistan Air Force; People's Liberation Army Air Force
- Website: paf.gov.pk eng.chinamil.com.cn

Exercise Shaheen was a series of military exercises held by China and Pakistan between 2011 and 2021. It involved joint aerial exercises performed by the Pakistan Air Force (PAF) and the People's Liberation Army Air Force (PLAAF). Hosted by each of the two countries at alternative years, the exercises were aimed to enhance aerial combat practices, interoperability, and regional security through mutual training and combat simulation practices.

== Overview ==
Shaheen-I was the inaugural exercise of this series and the first time Chinese military aircraft along with maintenance staff were deployed in Pakistan for operational purposes. It was conducted in March 2011 at an "Operational airbase" within Pakistan. Though official information was scarce, OSINT reports identified PLAAF Shenyang J-11s and PAF Dassault Mirages participated in the exercises held at PAF Base Rafiqui in Shorkot.

Shaheen-II was the first to be held in China at an undisclosed airbase within Hotan Prefecture. It took place from 03 to 22 September 2013. Mirage-VEF ROSE-IIs from the No. 25 Squadron PAF and Chengdu F-7s from the No. 14 Squadron PAF took part in the exercises along with their respective ground staff. However information regarding the Chinese side was not available.

== Controversies ==
The Exercises has been subject to a series of controversies as it was inaugurated when US-Pakistan relations were at an all-time low particularly after the Raymond Allen Davis incident and 2011 US Drone Strikes which killed 40 tribesmen.

== See also ==
- Exercise Indus Shield
- Exercise Saffron Bandit
- Pakistan military exercises
