= Exercise Indus Shield =

Military exercise hosted by the Pakistan Air Force

Exercise Indus Shield مشق انڈس شیلڈ
- Status: Active
- Genre: Military exercise
- Venue: PAF Base Mushaf
- Country: Pakistan
- Years active: 3
- Established: 2023
- Most recent: Indus Shield 2023
- Participants: Pakistan Air Force & allied air forces
- Organiser: PAF Airpower Centre of Excellence

Exercise Indus Shield is a large-scale international aerial warfare exercise held by the Airpower Centre of Excellence (ACE) in Sargodha, Pakistan. The aim of the exercise is to simulate various military tactics by enabling participating air powers to maximise their warfighting potential in air operations through synergistic employment of multi-domain capabilities in an integrated training environment. It consists of a traditional "Blue force" vs. "Red force" scenario with participants engaging each other in simulated battles.

Indus Shield is the largest multinational air force exercise in the South Asian region led and organized by the Pakistan Air Force through its Airpower Centre of Excellence. The last edition in 2024 featured participation from 24 esteemed air forces, larger than Indian Air Force's Exercise Tarang Shakti, the second largest air force exercise in South Asia with 12 participants and 18 observers.

== Background ==
Exercise Indus Shield is organised by the PAF Airpower Centre of Excellence (ACE) at PAF Base Mushaf in Sargodha. It has hosted many other exercises including ACES Meet, Shaheen and Falcon Talon. ACE facilitates the participants of these exercises with simulating systems and by exposing them to battlefield environments in order to enhance decision making and strategic planning.

== 2023 ==
The first Exercise Indus Shield was held from 6–25 October 2023 in which 14 countries participated. These included Pakistan, Turkey, Saudi Arabia, Qatar, the United Arab Emirates, Egypt, Oman, Bahrain, Azerbaijan, Indonesia, Morocco, Uzbekistan, China and Hungary. The Pakistani Air chief and Army chief along with the airforce chiefs of Azerbaijan, Turkey and Hungary also witnessed the execution of the wargames.

Dissimilar air combat training, SEAD, BVR combat along with many other strategies were practiced during the exercise.

== 2024 ==
Indus Shield-2024 was the second edition of the Multilateral Exercise Indus Shield. Indus Shield-2024 largest multinational aerial exercise in the South Asian region, featuring participation from 24 esteemed air forces, adhering to its motto, “Stronger When Together.” Air forces from 24 countries participated in the Indus Shield including, Pakistan Air Force, Saudi Air Force, Turkish Airforce, Egyptian Air Force, PLA Air Force of China, Azerbaijani Air Force, Bangladesh Air Force, Sri Lanka Air Force, Malaysian Air Force, Indonesian Air Force, Oman Air Force, UAE Air Force, Qatari Air Force, Bahraini Air Force, Iranian Air Force, Iraqi Air Force, Jordanian Air Force, Moroccon Air Force, German Air Force, Romanian Air Force, Tanzania Air Force, Malawi Air Force, Zimbabwe Air Force, and South African Air Force.

Compared to Indus Shield 2023, this year’s exercise has drawn the participation of 10 additional countries, making it largest air force exercise in the South Asian region.

The Royal Saudi Air Force (RSAF) has deployed six Panavia Tornado fighter jets, while the Turkish Air Force is contributing F-16s, and the Egyptian Air Force has provided Mirage 2000 aircraft. Pakistan is represented by its J-10C fighter jets.

=== Indus Shield-Chinese ===
Indus Shield-Chinese was the special bilateral exercise between Pakistan Air Force and PLA Air Force of China. Pakistan Air Force (PAF) said exercise was conducted "separately" with the Chinese People's Liberation Army Air Force (PLAAF) under the Indus Shield-2024, which is ''multilaterial'' exercise involving air forces from several countries.

The exercise witnessed participation from People’s Liberation Army Air Force of China, with its personnel and high-tech equipment comprising AESA Radar and Long Range BVR Equipped J-16 & J-10C fighter aircraft, Lethal HQ-22 Surface to Air Defence system, Potent Airborne Electronic Warfare YTG-9 Platform, alongside KJ-500 Airborne Early Warning system pitched against PAF’s J-10C and JF-17 Block-III fighter jets simulating contemporary aerial combat scenarios.

== See also ==
- Pakistani military exercises
- Exercise Red Flag
- Red Flag – Alaska
- Exercise Pitch Black
