= PAF Airpower Centre of Excellence =

- Active: 22 February 2016 – present
- Country: Pakistan
- Allegiance: Pakistan
- Branch: Pakistan Air Force
- Type: Wing / Airpower and Air Warfare Research, Planning, and Development Establishment
- Role: Research, Planning, and Development of Airpower and Air Warfare Doctrines and Strategies
- Part of: Central Air Command, Pakistan Air Force
- Garrison/HQ: PAF Base Mushaf
- Nickname: PAF ACE

The PAF Airpower Centre of Excellence or PAF ACE is an airpower and air warfare research, planning, and development facility of the Pakistan Air Force (PAF) based at PAF Base Mushaf, Sargodha, Pakistan.

Operationally, PAF ACE has the status of a Wing under the PAF's Central Air Command (CAC), with three fighter squadrons of the PAF's Combat Commanders' School (CCS) under its command.

PAF ACE is geared primarily towards the research, planning, and development of airpower and air warfare doctrines and strategies and linking airpower research and air combat doctrines and strategies with air combat operations to orchestrate effective military air campaigns.

== History ==
The groundbreaking of PAF ACE facility was done at PAF Base Mushaf on 22 February 2016. Also in 2016, the PAF's Combat Commanders' School (CCS) was placed under the operational command of PAF ACE.

== Mission ==
PAF ACE is tasked with the research, planning, and development of airpower and air warfare doctrines and strategies, and towards building a country's capacity to undertake effective multi-domain air warfare operations. Specifically, PAF ACE aims to build the capacity of the PAF to effectively utilize its intelligence, surveillance, reconnaissance (ISR), and precision-strike assets and capabilities in an effective manner.

PAF ACE is also open to air forces from friendly countries.

== See also ==
- Pakistan Air Force Academy, Risalpur
- Combat Commanders' School, Sargodha
- PAF Air War College, Karachi
