= Combat Commanders' School =

Pakistan Air Force school

- Active: 5 May 1976 – present
- Country: Pakistan
- Allegiance: Pakistan
- Branch: Pakistan Air Force
- Type: Advanced Air Combat Tactics Development and Training School
- Role: Advanced Air Combat Tactics Development and Training
- Size: 3 Fighter Squadrons
- Part of: PAF Airpower Centre of Excellence, Central Air Command
- Garrison/HQ: PAF Base Mushaf
- Nickname: Top Guns
- Mottos: Shamsheer-o-Sana Awal (Urdu) (Translation: "At first sword and spear")
- Engagements: 1979-1989 Soviet-Afghan War; 2019 Operation Swift Retort; 2025 Operation Bunyan-un-Marsoos
- Decorations: Sitara-i-Jurat, Tamgha-i-Jurat
- Battle honours: 1979-1989 Soviet-Afghan War; 2019 Operation Swift Retort; 2025 Operation Bunyan-un-Marsoos

The Combat Commanders' School or CCS is the advanced air combat tactics development and training school of the Pakistan Air Force (PAF) based at PAF Base Mushaf, Sargodha, Pakistan.

CCS is a part of the PAF Airpower Centre of Excellence (PAF ACE) under the PAF's Central Air Command (CAC). Operationally, PAF ACE has the status of a Wing under the CAC, with three fighter squadrons of the CCS under its command.

CCS is geared primarily towards the mid-career advanced air combat training of PAF fighter squadron commanders, air defence controllers, and instructors and for the development of advanced air combat tactics for the PAF's fighter squadrons.

== History ==
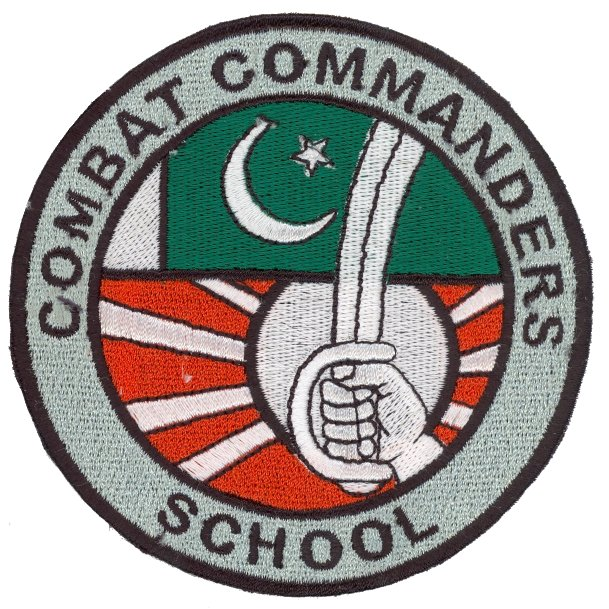
CCS Patch

The CCS has its origins in the PAF's Flight Leaders' School (FLS) established at PAF Base Masroor at Karachi in April 1958 under the PAF's first Pakistani Commander-in-Chief, Air Marshal Asghar Khan, with Wing Commander M.Z. Masud (later Air Commodore) as the FLS's first commanding officer. After the 1965 India-Pakistan War, the FLS underwent periodic closures due to various constraints and faded from the scene in the early 1970s.

In late 1974, the PAF decided to establish an institution that would not only revive the FLS but surpass it.

Consequently, the CCS was established on 5 May 1976 at PAF Base Sargodha with Wing Commander Hakimullah (later Air Chief Marshal) as its first commanding officer. It was inaugurated officially by Air Chief Marshal Zulfiqar Ali Khan on 15 August 1977. At its inception, the CCS was equipped with two fighter squadrons comprising Mirage III and F-6 fighters. On 16 July 1988, an F-16 squadron was added. In 1993, the F-6 squadron was re-equipped with F-7Ps. On 26 January 2015, a fourth squadron equipped with JF-17s was raised.

In 2016, CCS was made a part of the newly-formed PAF ACE under the CAC.

In 2021, the CCS F-7P Squadron was decommissioned after the retirement of all F-7Ps/FT-7Ps from PAF service.

In February 2023, No. 23 Air Superiority (AS) Squadron 'Talons', equipped with the newer and more advanced F-7PGs/FT-7PGs, was transferred to CCS from 31 AS Wing (Western Air Command), PAF Base Samungli (Quetta) to serve as the new CCS F-7PG Squadron.

== Mission ==
The CCS has the following mission:

1. Research and development of advanced air combat tactics
2. Application of advanced air combat tactics
3. Training of fighter squadron commanders, air defence controllers, and instructors on advanced air combat tactics
4. Optimum and effective utilization of weapons systems
5. Standardisation and evaluation of fighter squadrons
6. Prescribing minimum standards for fighter squadron training and operational readiness

== Training ==
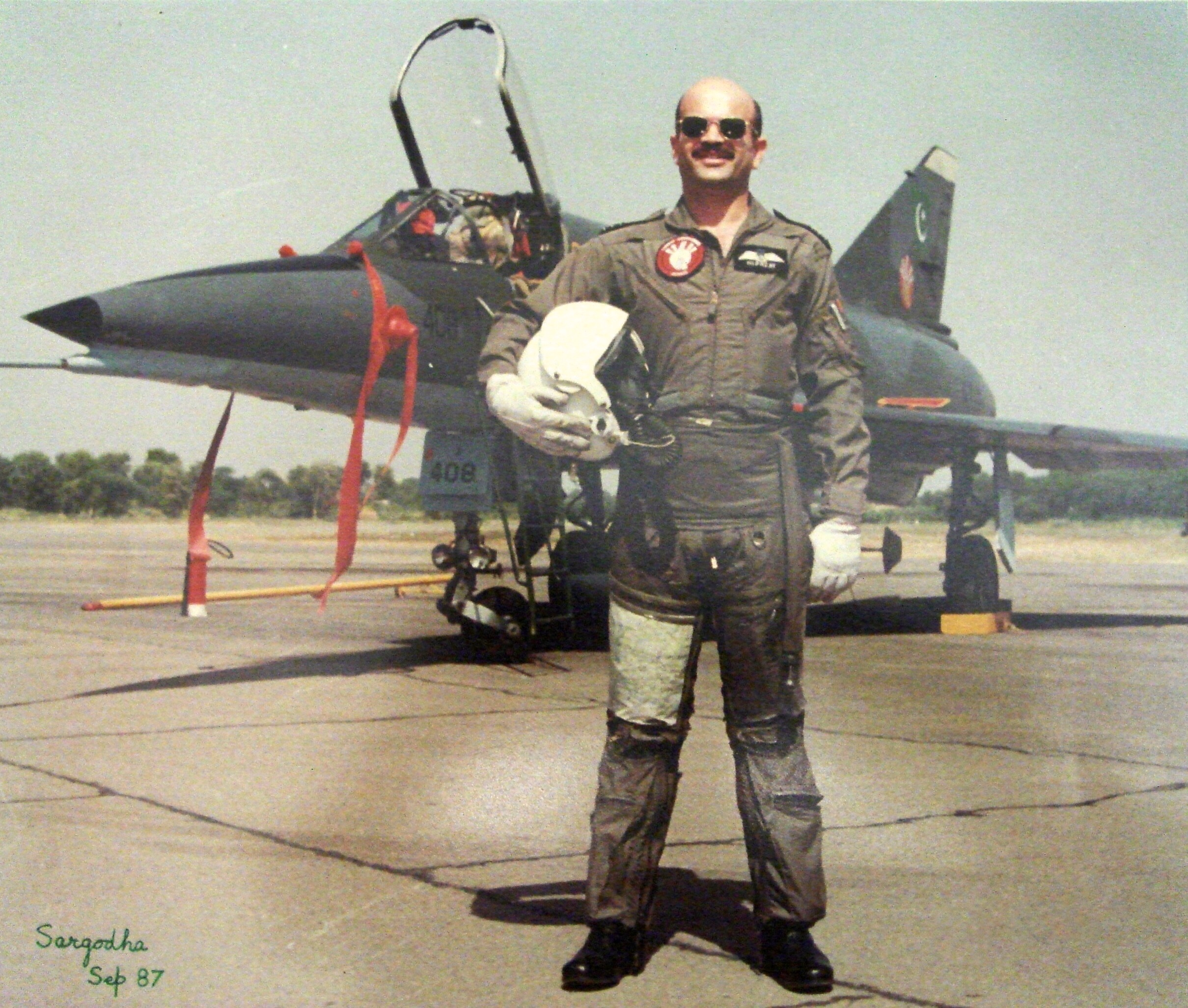
A CCS Mirage Squadron instructor pilot with his Mirage 5PA fighter at PAF Base Sargodha in September 1987

The CCS conducts Combat Commanders' Courses (CCCs) for combat pilots and combat controllers. Previously, Fighter Weapon Instructors' Courses (FWICs) were also conducted for junior leaders. Subsequently, however, FWICs were discontinued to accommodate the more urgent need for imparting training to commanding officers, who would, in turn, impart training to junior officers.

As of February 2023, the CCS has conducted 57 CCCs.

Pilots are normally selected to undergo rigorous training at the CCS after around 9 to 12 years of service with the PAF. Once selected by Air Headquarters, they undergo three courses: a 4–5 month Combat Commanders' Course (CCC), a 3-month Weapons Course (WC), and a 4–5 week Fighter Integration Course (FIC). The courses are reputed to be very tough and not all CCS students pass. Successful graduates can go on to attain the rank of Wing Commander and command a fighter squadron.

Dissimilar air combat training (DACT) at the CCS is renowned "throughout the world" for giving complete freedom and responsibility to participating pilots for forming and executing their mission plans. Combat missions are regularly flown at tree-top height and pilots are also responsible for their own post-flight learning. Foreign Chiefs of Air Staff visiting the base have been "most impressed" and "showed surprise at the freedom allotted to the student DACT pilots."

CCS staff pay annual visits to all PAF fighter squadrons to evaluate and enhance combat capabilities and ensure standards. In June 1990, the Squadron Combat Upgradation Programme (SCUP) was initiated and four-month-long cycles were conducted by October 1990, each involving two fighter squadrons, F-16 pilots, and ground controllers. In 1992, SCUP was replaced with the regular Exercise Saffron Bandit, which is a more demanding and complicated near-realistic environment for participating fighter pilots and air defence controllers. Exercise Saffron Bandit is supervised and its syllabus constantly improved by the CCS.

== Squadrons ==
=== Active squadrons ===
The CCS has three active fighter squadrons under its command:

Squadron	Nickname	Role	Command	Wing	Date Established	Base	Aircraft	Notes
CCS F-16 Squadron (No. 29 Squadron)	Aggressors	Advanced Air Combat Tactics Development & Training	Central Air Command	PAF Airpower Centre of Excellence	16 July 1988	PAF Base Mushaf	F-16A/B MLU	
CCS JF-17 Squadron	Fierce Dragons	Advanced Air Combat Tactics Development & Training	Central Air Command	PAF Airpower Centre of Excellence	26 January 2015	PAF Base Mushaf	JF-17A/B	
CCS F-7PG Squadron (No. 23 Squadron)	Talons	Advanced Air Combat Tactics Development & Training	Central Air Command	PAF Airpower Centre of Excellence	16 March 1961 (transferred to CCS from 31 AS Wing (Western Air Command), PAF Base Samungli (Quetta) in February 2023)	PAF Base Mushaf	F-7PG/FT-7PG	

=== Decommissioned squadrons ===
The following CCS fighter squadrons have been decommissioned:

Squadron	Nickname	Role	Command	Wing	Date Established	Base	Aircraft	Notes
CCS Mirage Squadron	Sky Bolts	Advanced Air Combat Tactics Development & Training	Central Air Command	PAF Airpower Centre of Excellence	5 May 1976	PAF Base Mushaf	Dassault Mirage IIIEA, Dassault Mirage 5PA	Squadron number-plated in January 2024.
CCS F-7 Squadron	Dashings	Advanced Air Combat Tactics Development & Training	Central Air Command	PAF Airpower Centre of Excellence	Raised as "CCS F-6 Squadron" on 5 May 1976. Re-equipped with F-7Ps in 1993 and name changed to "CCS F-7 Squadron".	PAF Base Mushaf	F-7P/FT-7P	Squadron decommissioned in 2021 after retirement of all PAF F-7Ps/FT-7Ps in 2020.

== Commanding officers ==
The CCS is commanded by a mid-ranked PAF officer known as the "Commanding Officer" or "CO", who is of Group Captain rank. Below is the list of CCS Commanding Officers.

- Group Captain Hakimullah (5 May 1976-January 1978) (later Air Chief Marshal)
- Group Captain Cecil Chaudhry (January 1978-January 1979)
- Group Captain Abbas H. Mirza
- Group Captain Dilawar Hussain
- Group Captain Aliuddin
- Group Captain Muhammad Abbas Khattak (later Air Chief Marshal)
- Group Captain Muhammad Arshad Chaudhry
- Group Captain Abdul Sattar Alvi
- Group Captain Zahid Anis
- Group Captain Shahid Javed
- Group Captain Riffat Munir
- Group Captain Abdul Razzaq Anjum
- Group Captain Khalid Chaudhry
- Group Captain Abdul Hameed Qadri
- Group Captain Sabeeh Hussain
- Group Captain Faaiz Amir
- Group Captain Atique Rafiq
- Group Captain Raja Rizwan Ullah Khan
- Group Captain Sohail Aman (later Air Chief Marshal)
- Group Captain Javaid Ahmed
- Group Captain Muhammad Azam
- Group Captain Abdul Jabbar Khan
- Group Captain Syed Nomaan Ali
- Group Captain Muhammad Suleman Aziz
- Group Captain Zahid Mehmood
- Group Captain Abdul Moeed Khan
- Group Captain Nadeem Akhtar
- Group Captain Muhammad Zaeem Afzal

== Published sources ==
- Downing, Mke, Pakistan's 'Top Gun' Base, Air Forces Monthly, April 1992
- Pakistan Air Force, The Story of the Pakistan Air Force 1988-1998: A Battle Against Odds, Islamabad: Shaheen Foundation, 2000 (pp. 289-292)
- Pakistan Air Force, The Story of the Pakistan Air Force: A Saga of Courage and Honour, Islamabad: Shaheen Foundation, 1988 (pp. 534, 589-590)
- Warnes, Alan, The Pakistan Air Force 1998-2008: A New Dawn, 2009, Chapter 3 (“Training for Combat”), (p. 48)

== See also ==
- Pakistan Air Force Academy, Risalpur
- PAF Airpower Centre of Excellence (PAF ACE), Sargodha
- PAF Air War College, Karachi
- List of Pakistan Air Force squadrons
