= Constance Prem Nath Dass =

Indian academic administrator (1886–1971)

President of Isabella Thoburn College
- In office 1939 – 1945

Personal details
- Born: Constance Maya Das; 1886
- Died: 1971 (aged 84–85)
- Relations: Mohini Maya Das (sister)
- Children: 6, including B. K. Dass
- Education: Goucher College (BA); University of Allahabad (MA); Columbia Teacher's College (MA)
- Profession: College administrator

Constance Prem Nath Dass (née Constance Maya Das; 1886 – 1971) was an Indian educator and college administrator. She was president of Isabella Thoburn College (IT College), a women's college in Lucknow, which made her the first Indian woman to serve as the principal of a Christian college in India.

== Early life and education ==
Constance Maya Das was born in 1886 to Rai Bahadur Maya Das and Mohini Chandulal, prominent Punjabi second generation-Presbyterians from Firozpur, northwest British India.

Rai Bahadur Maya Das sent his older daughters, including Mohini Maya Das, to America and Edinburgh to have a western education but chose to have Constance educated at home before attending schools in Lahore and later, in 1904, at Isabella Thoburn College. While at IT College, she met John Goucher who paid for her to study at Goucher College from 1909 to 1911. From Goucher, she earned a Bachelor of Arts she graduated Phi Beta Kappa. She returned to Isabella Thoburn College where she taught and later earned a Master of Arts in English literature from the University of Allahabad.

== Career ==
In 1931, Dass became the vice principal of Thoburn College. While on a sabbatical between 1938 and 1939, she earned a master's degree, Phi Beta Kappa, in education from Columbia Teacher's College. She was appointed as the president of the college upon return, becoming the first Indian woman to serve as the principal of a Christian College in India. She retired in 1945. In 1946, she gave the commencement address at the invitation of Goucher College. She then went to Ontario for a peace conference organized by John Mott for war refugees. She remained closely associated with IT College throughout her retirement, including serving on its Board of Governors until her death.

== Awards and honors ==
Dass was awarded honorary doctorates from Goucher College and Boston University. She is the subject of the biography Constance Prem Nath Dass: An Extraordinary History, 1886–1971, co-written by her granddaughter, Amrita Dass, with Nina David.

== Personal life ==
While studying at IT College, she met her future husband, Prem Nath Dass, who proposed to her in 1906. She told him that she wanted to study in America, so he waited for her to return. Prem Nath Dass was from a prominent Christian family in the United Provinces. The couple had six children between 1915 and 1924. She was a nationalist and a political moderate. Widowed in 1931, she died in 1971, aged 84 or 85.
