= Central Air Command (Pakistan) =

Pakistan Air Force Regional Command

- Active: July 1982 – present (44 years, 2 months)
- Country: Pakistan
- Allegiance: Pakistan Armed Forces
- Branch: Pakistan Air Force
- Type: Regional Command
- Role: Air Defence, OCA, Offensive Ground Support, Airlift.
- Headquarters: PAF Base Mushaf (1982–2007); PAF Base Lahore (2007–Present)
- Nickname: CAC
- Motto: ضرب کاری
- Engagements: War on terror Operation Sentinel; Operation Swift Retort

The Central Air Command (CAC) is one of five operational commands of the Pakistan Air Force, reporting to the Air Headquarters at Islamabad. CAC is headquartered at PAF Base Lahore.

CAC is commanded by a senior PAF officer known as the "Air Officer Commanding" or "AOC", who is of Air Vice Marshal rank.

== History ==
During the Indo-Pakistani wars like the 1965 War and the 1971 War, Indian attacks and invasions were focused towards the central parts of Pakistan. Hence to centralize operations in the theatre, Central Air Command (CAC) was established by the PAF in July 1982. While initially headquartered in the building of Combat Commander's School at PAF Base Sargodha, it was shifted to a new location at the base of the Kirana Hills Site where it stayed for 20 years. In 2007, the command was transferred to its current location at PAF Base Lahore where it received a new office at the old terminal of the Lahore Airport by November 2018.

== Components ==
The command controls various PAF bases which have squadrons equipped with F-16s, JF-17s, Mirage IIIs, Mirage Vs and DA-20ss. It also commands the largest Dassault MirageIII/V fleet in the world.

- PAF Base Mushaf
  - No. 38 Wing
- PAF Base Rafiqui
  - No. 34 Wing
- PAF Base Lahore
- PAF Base Sakesar
- Ghazi Airbase

== See also ==
- Northern Air Command (NAC), Peshawar
- Southern Air Command (SAC), Karachi
- Air Defence Command (ADC), Rawalpindi
- Air Force Strategic Command (AFSC), Islamabad
- List of Pakistan Air Force bases
- List of active Pakistan Air Force aircraft

== Published sources ==
- Pakistan Air Force, The Story of the Pakistan Air Force 1988-1998: A Battle Against Odds, Islamabad: Shaheen Foundation, 2000
- Pakistan Air Force, The Story of the Pakistan Air Force: A Saga of Courage and Honour, Islamabad: Shaheen Foundation, 1988
- Warnes, Alan, The Pakistan Air Force 1998-2008: A New Dawn, 2009
