= Mohini Maya Das =

Indian educator (born c. 1884)

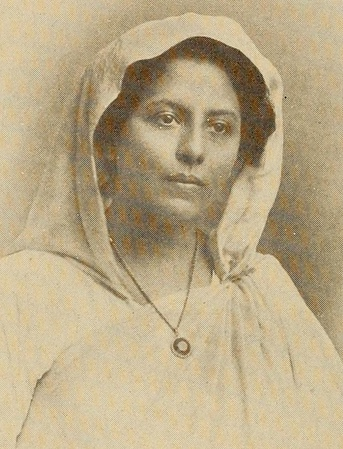
Dora Mohini Maya Das, from a 1922 publication.

Dora Mohini Maya Das (born about 1884) was an Indian educator and speaker. She was the YWCA's associate general secretary for India, Burma, and Ceylon.

== Early life and education ==
Dora Mohini Maya Das was from Firozpur, born to Christian Indian parents, Rai Bahadur Maya Das and Mohini Chandulal. One of her sisters was Constance Prem Nath Dass (1886–1971), a college president in India. Another sister, Gunwati (Gertrude) Maya Das, married Raja Maharaj Singh, the first Indian Governor of Bombay, in 1918.

Mohini Maya Das was one of the first three women enrolled in the Forman Christian College at Lahore. She attended the Northfield School for Girls in Massachusetts, and was the first Indian student to attend Mount Holyoke College, when she arrived in 1906. She earned a bachelor's degree there in 1909. While at Mount Holyoke, she was known as Dora Maya Das, and wrote for student publications. A play by Mohini Maya Das, "The Hindu Wife of Ram Lal", was performed by the Mount Holyoke Dramatic Club in 1909. After her graduation, the Maya Das Club of the YWCA in Westfield, New York was named in her honor.

== Career ==
Mohini Maya Das (she preferred her Indian personal name to the English name Dora) was the associate general secretary of the YWCA for India, Burma, and Ceylon from 1920 to 1923, and a vice chairman of the General Committee of the World Student Christian Federation from 1922 to 1923. In the latter role, she addressed the World Student Christian Federation conference in Beijing in 1922.

Maya Das was critical of white Westerners working in India, including the YWCA, by the time she spoke in Beijing in 1922. "Has the country of religious mysticism nothing for you? Is the East just a market for your goods, just a place to exploit the people? Has it nothing to give you, something you can only find if you endeavor to understand it?" she asked in her lecture. "I beg of you from the West to try to understand us in the East, not in a cursory way but with true knowledge."

She met with Mohandas K. Gandhi on the place of women's work in an independent India, though she could not endorse his strategy of non-cooperation. She took an interest in the Social Service League of Calcutta, and in a summer institute for rural women workers. She served on the executive committee of India's National Christian Council until she resigned at the end of 1923, to marry.

== Personal life ==
Mohini Maya Das married J. N. Dass in early 1924. She continued to write and lecture on religious topics into the 1930s.
