= No. 9 Squadron PAF =

Military Unit

No. 9 Squadron Griffins
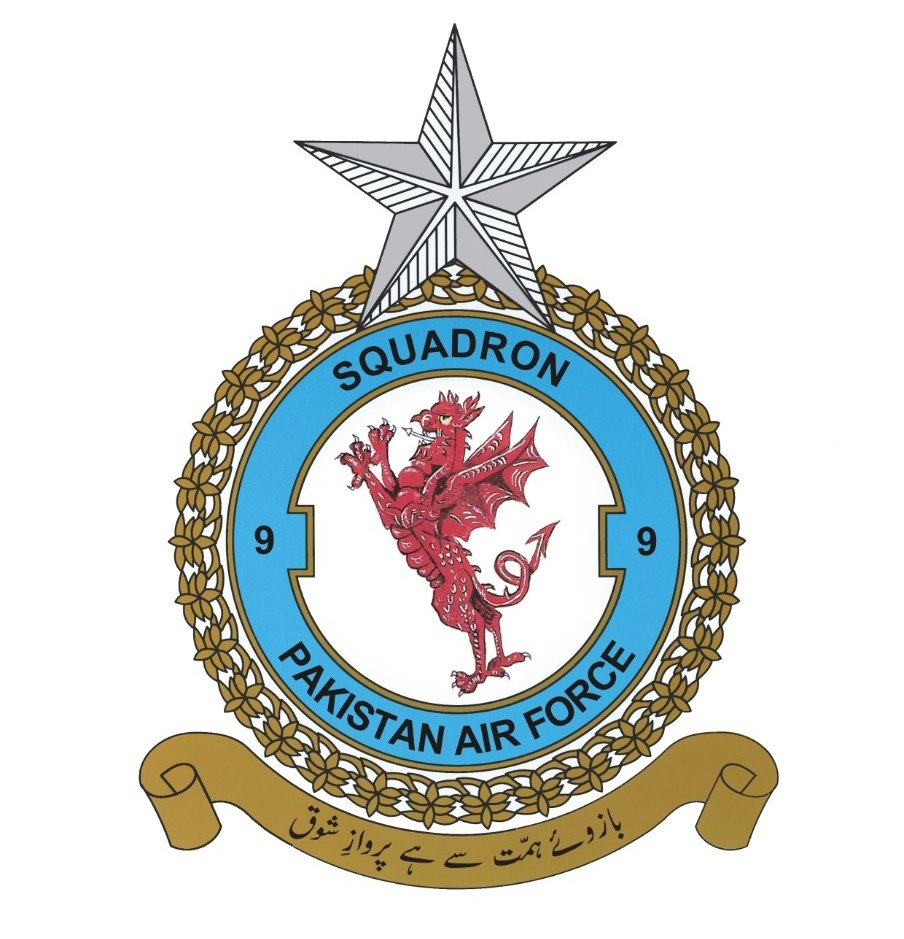
- Pakistan Airforce No.9 Squadron "Griffins"
- Active: 3 January 1944; 82 years ago
- Country: Pakistan
- Allegiance: United Kingdom (1943–1947); Pakistan (1947–present)
- Branch: Royal Indian Air Force (1943-47); Pakistan Air Force (1947–present)
- Role: Multi-role
- Part of: No. 38 Multi-Role Wing; Central Air Command
- Garrison/HQ: PAF Base Mushaf
- Nickname: Griffins
- Motto: How high you fly depends on how brave you are.
- Mascot: A standing red griffin
- Aircraft: F-16 Fighting Falcon
- Engagements: World War II; Burma Campaign; Arakan Operations; Indo-Pakistani War of 1947; Indo-Pakistani War of 1965; 1965 Air Operations; 1999 air defence alert; Cold War; Soviet–Afghan War; Spillover of Soviet - Afghan war in Pakistan; Chagai-I
- Decorations: 5× Sitara-e-Jurat
- Battle honours: Sargodha 65; Karachi 71

Commanders
- Notable commanders: Asghar Khan; Mohammad Akhtar; Abdul Rahim Khan; B. K. Dass; Zafar Chaudhry; Saeedullah Khan; Zulfiqar Ali Khan; Jamal A. Khan; Mervyn Middlecoat; Farooq Feroze Khan; Cecil Chaudhry; PQ Mehdi; Abdul Razzaq Anjum; Wing Commander Nauman Akram Shaheed

Insignia
- Patch

- Exercise Red Flag and Green Flag Patch

Aircraft flown
- Fighter: Hawker Hurricane IIC (1944–?); Hawker Tempest II (1947–1950); Hawker Sea Fury (1950–1961); F-104 Starfighter (1961–72); Dassault Mirage 5 (1973–1984); F-16 Fighting Falcon (1984–Present)

No. 9 Squadron, named the Griffins, is a Pakistan Air Force fighter squadron assigned to the No. 38 Multi-Role Wing of the PAF Central Air Command. The squadron is stationed at PAF Base Mushaf, Sargodha. It was the PAF's first fighter squadron and has been commanded by seven Chiefs of Air Staff of the Pakistan Air Force. The squadron crest is a red griffin which suggests strength, aggressiveness, and vigilance. Scrolls around the squadron crest display the battle honours Sargodha 65 and Karachi 71.The Griffins are considered as the PAF's most elite unit as well as its most senior.

The Griffins were officially twinned to the No. 9 Squadron RAF during a joint exercise at Mushaf Airbase. The ceremony was attended by Air Chiefs of both air forces, including Air Chief Marshal Stephen Hillier of the Royal Air Force.

== History ==
During World War II, the squadron was deployed in Burma where it was extensively involved in operations against the Japanese, later being awarded the sword of a Japanese general for its services. In August 1945, Asghar Khan took over command and the squadron was also converted to the Spitfire VIII the same year.

After the Soviet invasion of Afghanistan in 1979 there were many border violations by Russian and Afghan aircraft, three of which were shot down by No. 9 Squadron pilots. Two Sukhoi Su-22 fighters were downed on 17 May 1986, by Squadron Leader Mohammed Yousaf near Parachinar and an Antonov An-26 was downed by Squadron Leader Sikander Hayat on 30 March 1987. The Thomson-CSF ATLIS II laser designator pod was installed on No. 9 Squadron's F-16s from 1987 onwards to allow them to deliver laser-guided bombs.

=== Exercises ===
==== International ====
- Mid Link 74 – A CENTO exercise that took place at PAF Base Masroor in 1974.
- Anatolian Eagle 06 – In June 2006 a PAF contingent of F-16s from No. 9 Squadron was deployed to Konya Airbase in Turkey to take part in the Anatolian Eagle 2006 exercise.
- Red Flag 2010-4 – In mid-2010 the PAF sent six F-16B fighters and 100 personnel of No. 9 Squadron to Nellis Air Force Base in the United States, a journey that took six days and four stops, to take part in the Red Flag 2010-4 and Green Flag 2010-9 exercises. During the 12 days of the exercise, 57 air interdiction missions were flown by the PAF fighters and 50 air-to-air refuelling hook-ups were made with USAF tankers, during which 50,303 kg of jet fuel was transferred.
- Green Flag 2010-9
- Falcon Talon 2022

=== Aircraft Flown ===
No. 9 Squadron Griffins
| Role | Operational | Aircraft | Notes |
|---|---|---|---|
| Fighter | 1944–1947 | Hawker Hurricane IIC | |
| Fighter | 1947–1950 | Hawker Tempest II | |
| Fighter | 1950–1961 | Hawker Fury FB.60 | |
| Interceptor | 1961—~1971 | F-104A Starfighter | |
| Tactical Attack | 1973–1977 | Dassault Mirage 5PA | |
| Operational Conversion Unit (OCU) | 1977–1984 | Dassault Mirage 5PA | |
| Multi-Role | 1984—present | F-16 Fighting Falcon; F-16AM/BM Block 15 MLU | Second unit to be equipped with the F-16. Credited with 3 kills: two Su-22 on 17 May 1986, by Squadron Leader Mohammed Yousaf and an An-26 on 30 March 1987, by Squadron Leader Sikander Hayat. Equipped with the ATLIS II targeting pod in 1987 for ground attack role. Commanded by Wg. Cmd. Aamir Masood in 2006, who is now flying Sukhoi Su-30MKK with the Chinese Navy (PLAN). |

== Gallery ==
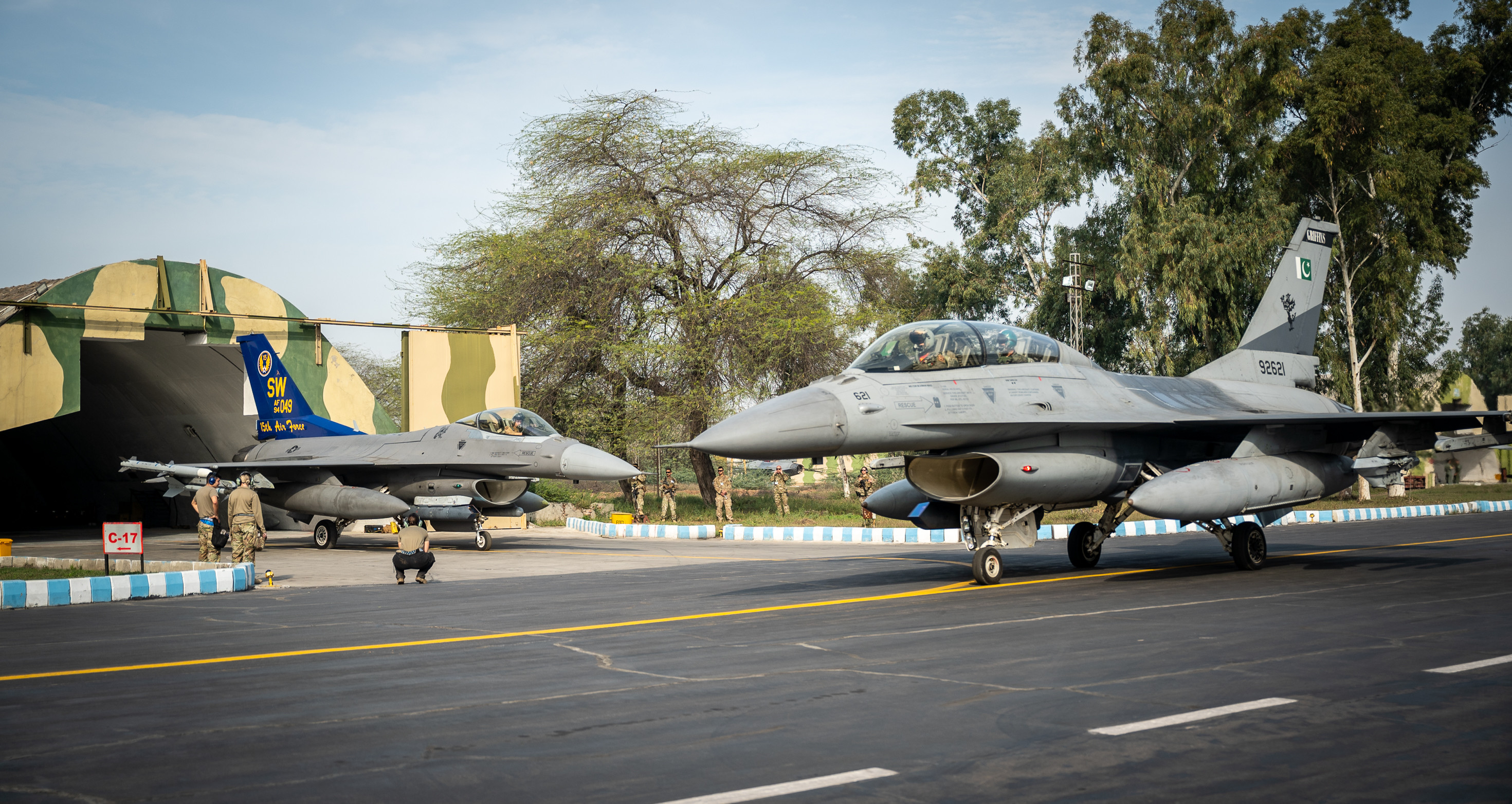
USAF and PAF F-16s during Falcon Talon 2022

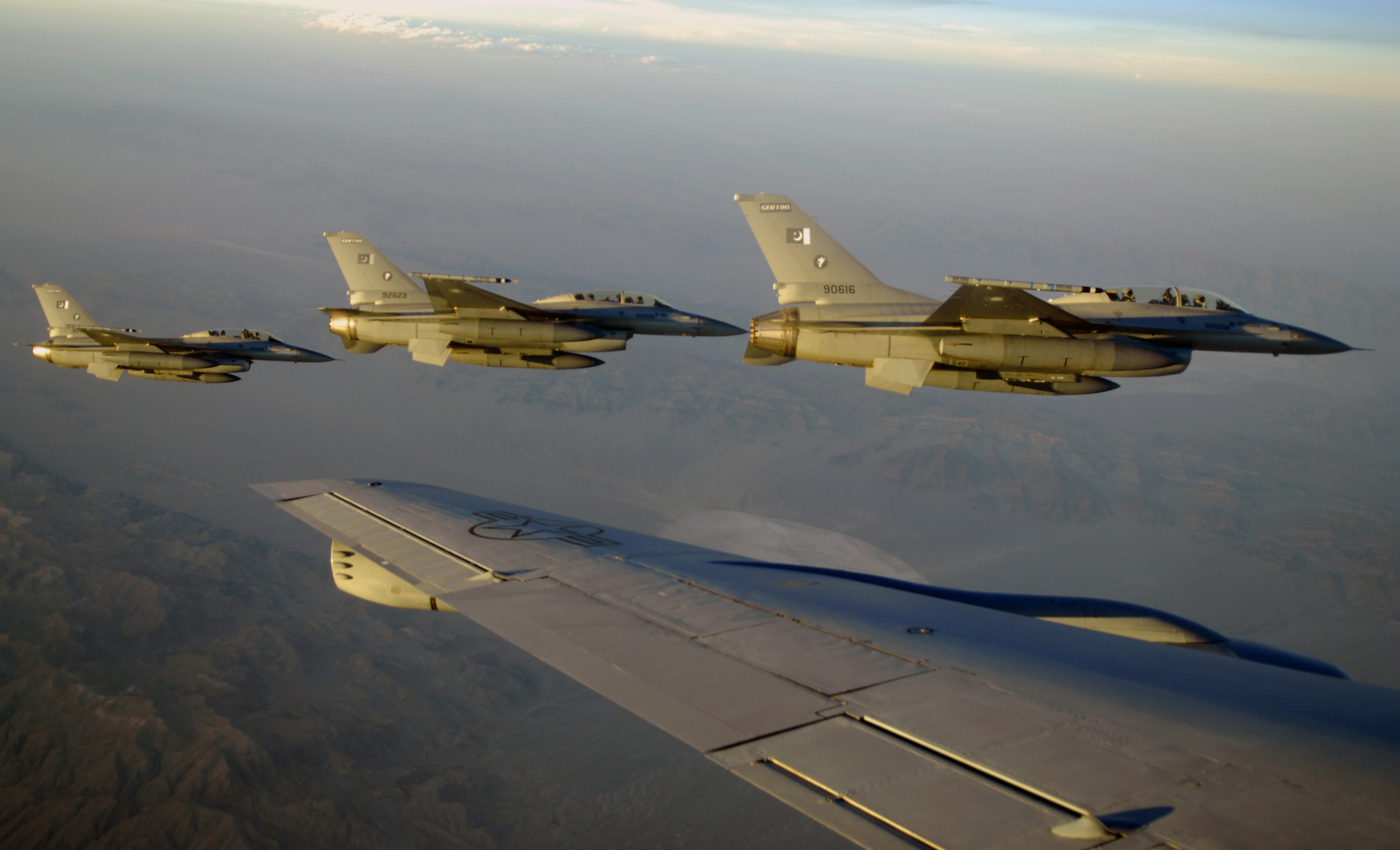
The Griffins flying F-16B fighters during the Red Flag 2010 exercise.

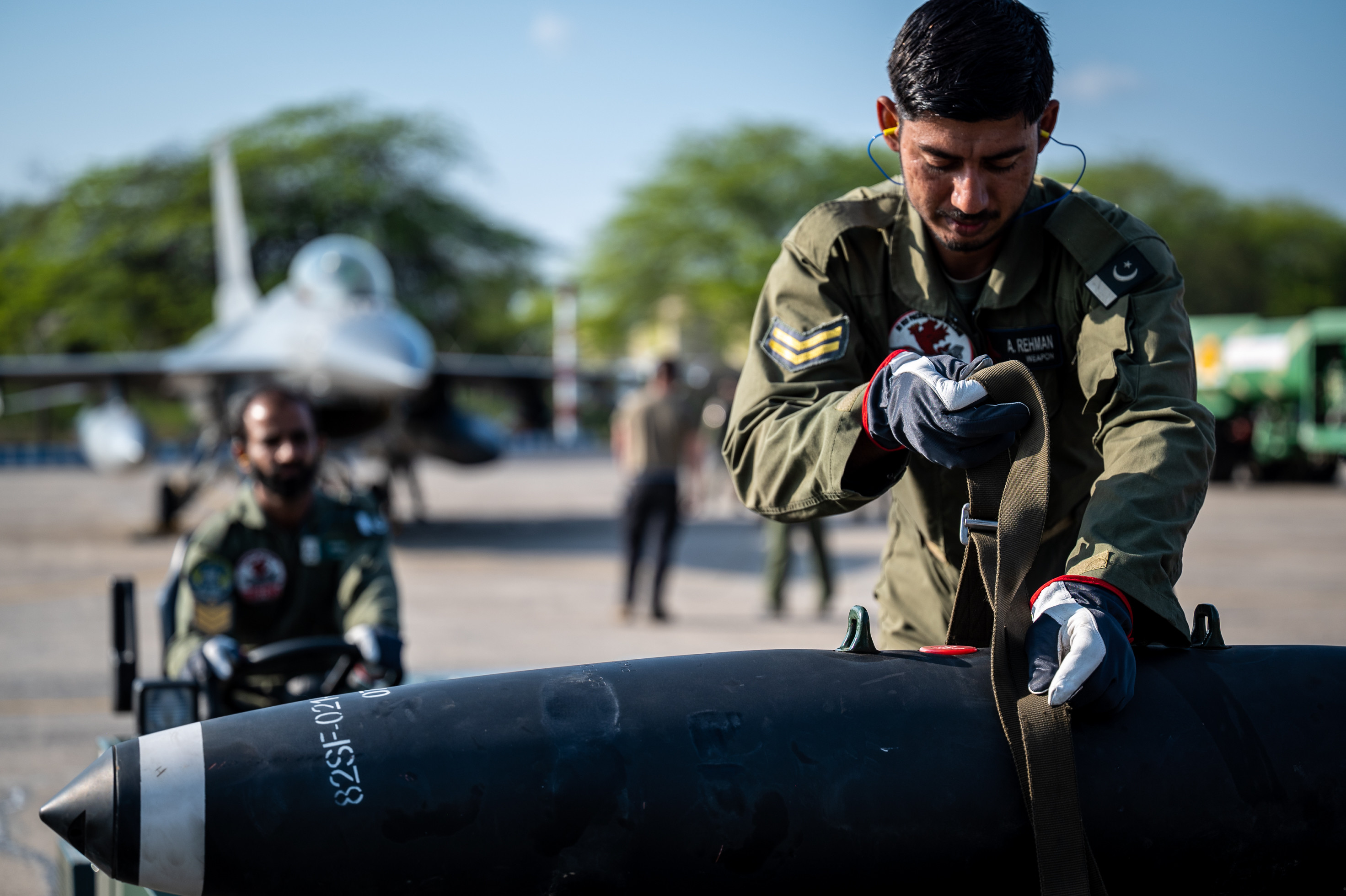
Ground crew of no.9 squadron performing F-16 maintenance duties

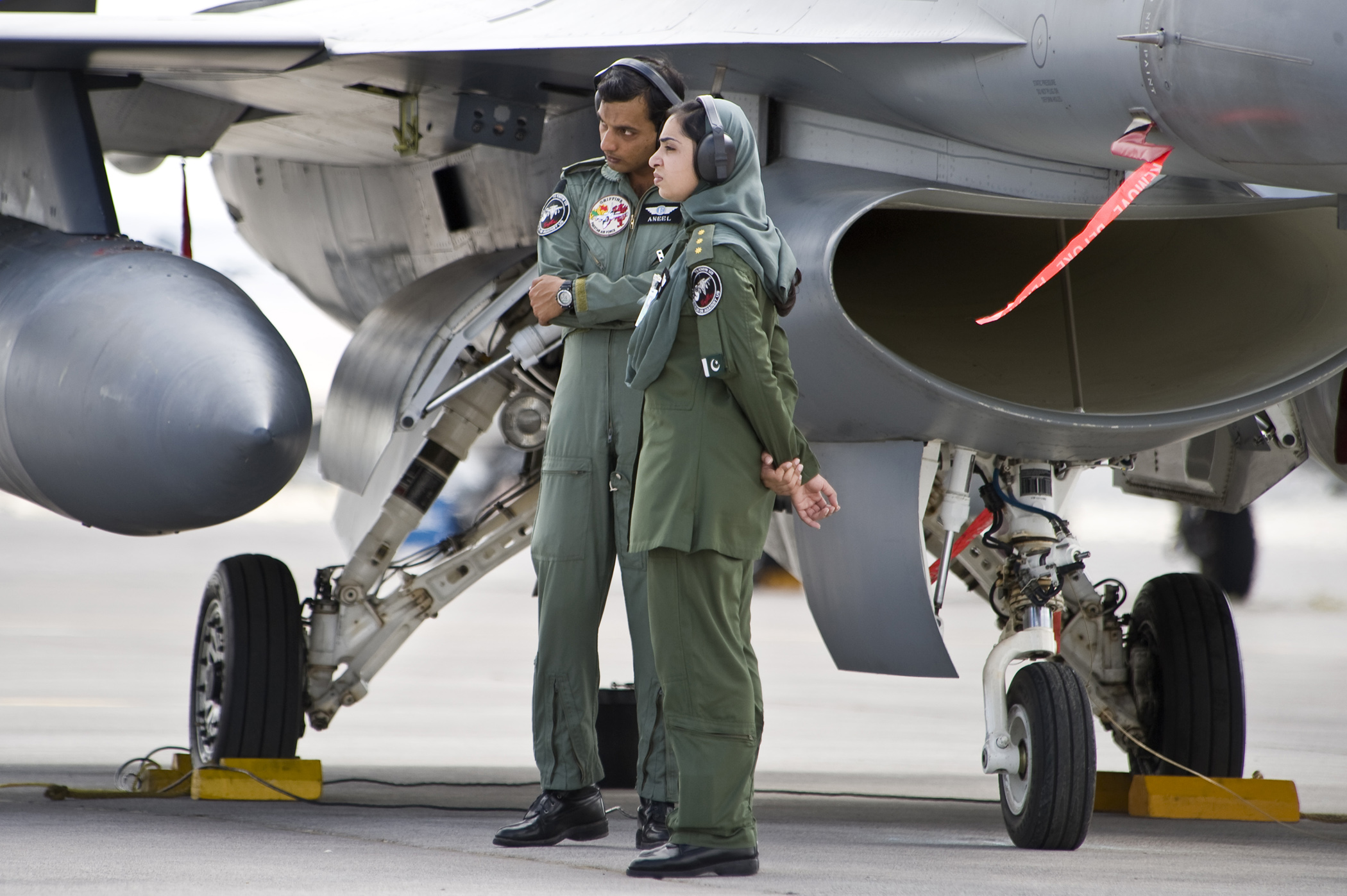

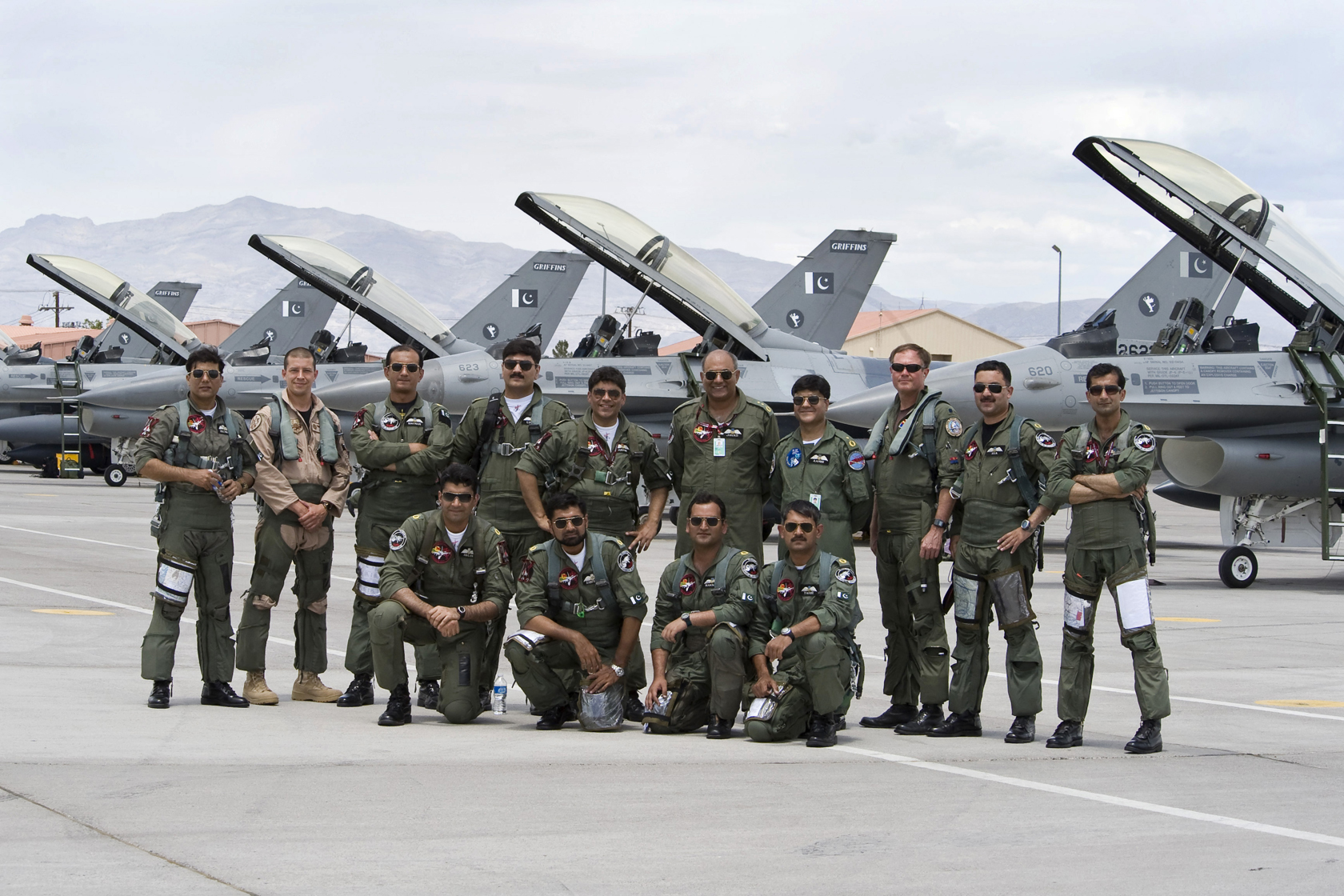
A group photo of Griffins pilots deployed to Red Flag.

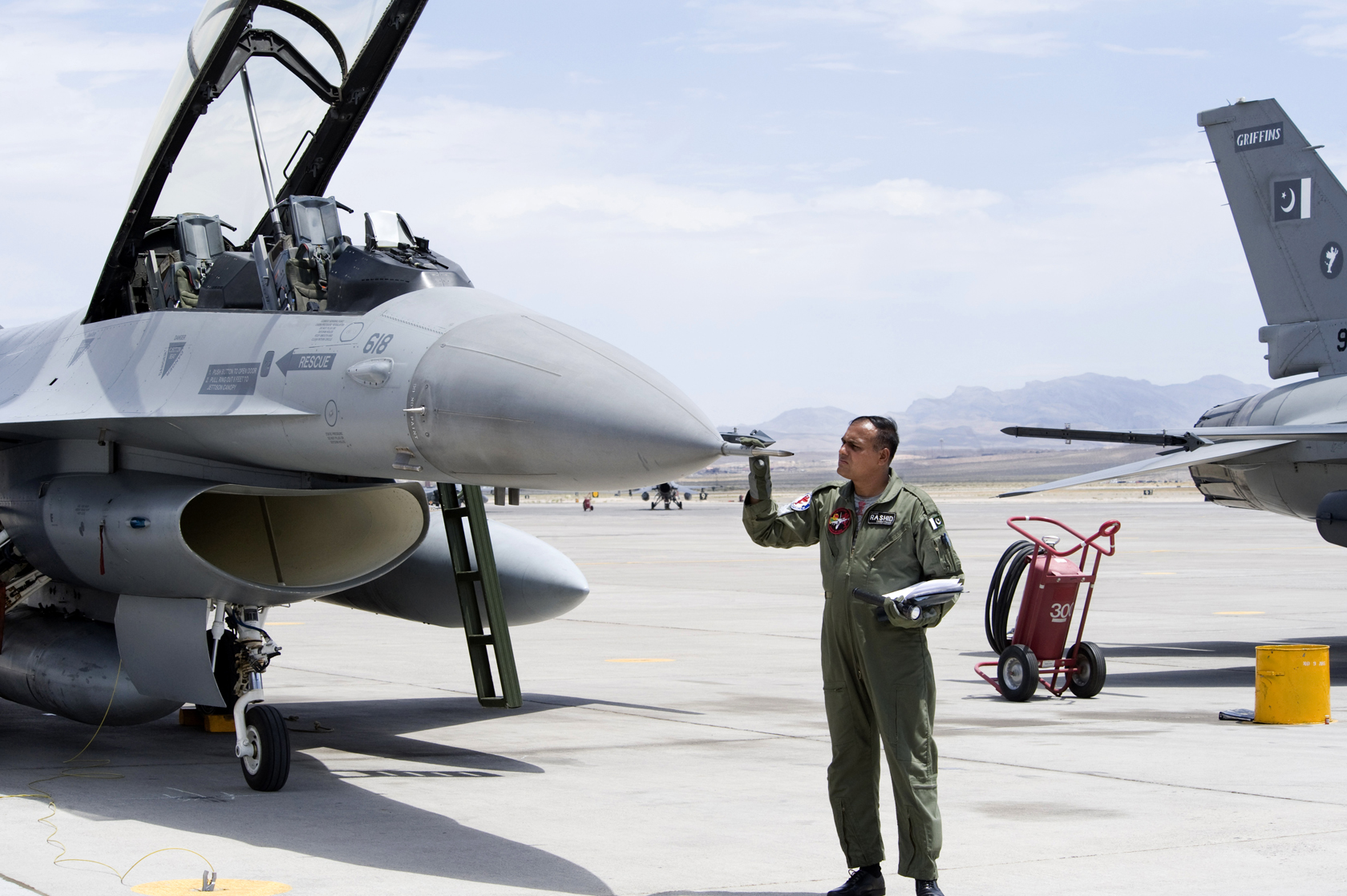
An officer performs a post-flight inspection after the Griffins arrive at Red

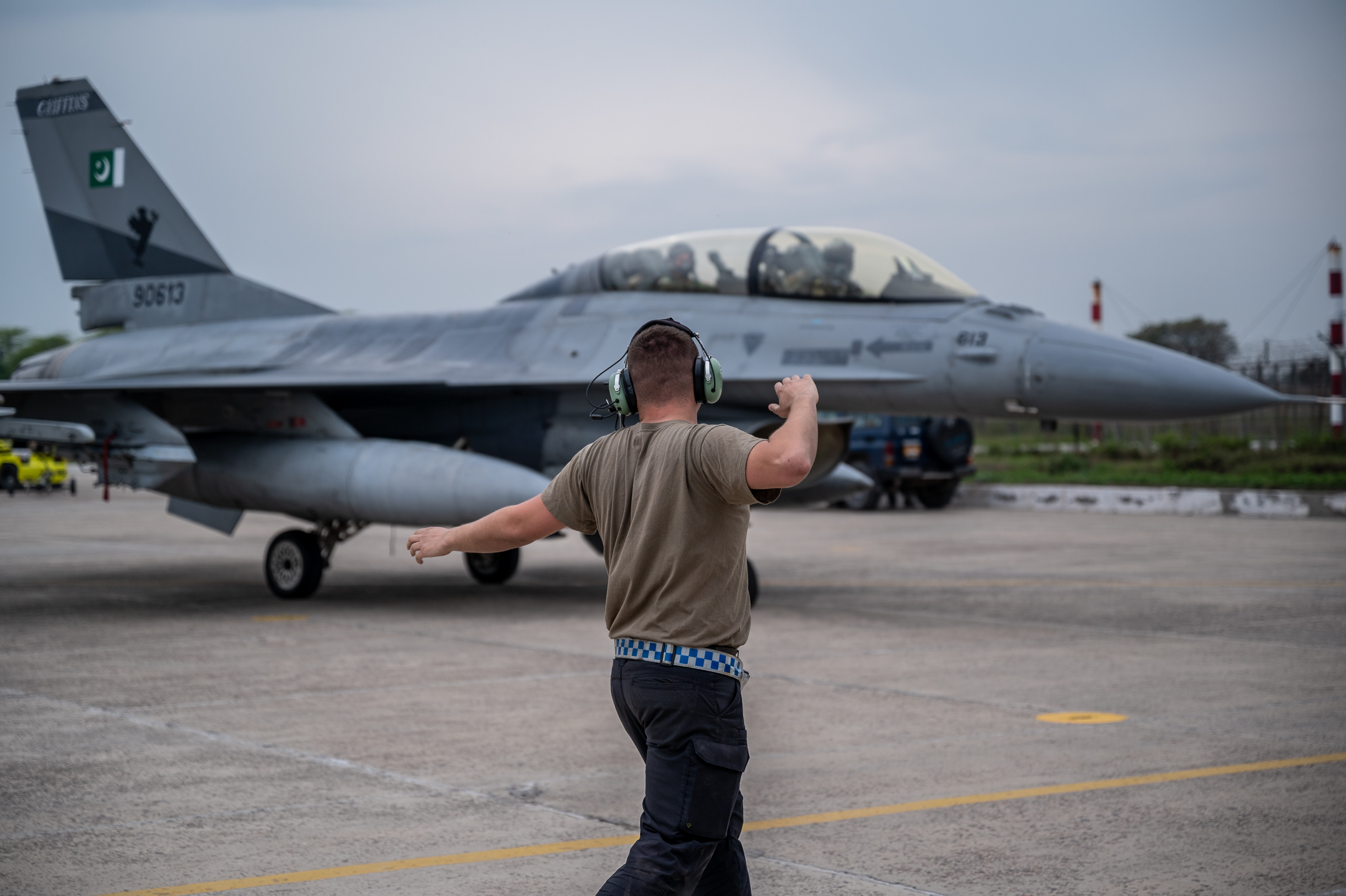
USAF ground crew signals a F-16BM from the No. 9 squadron "Griffins" during Falcon Talon 2022

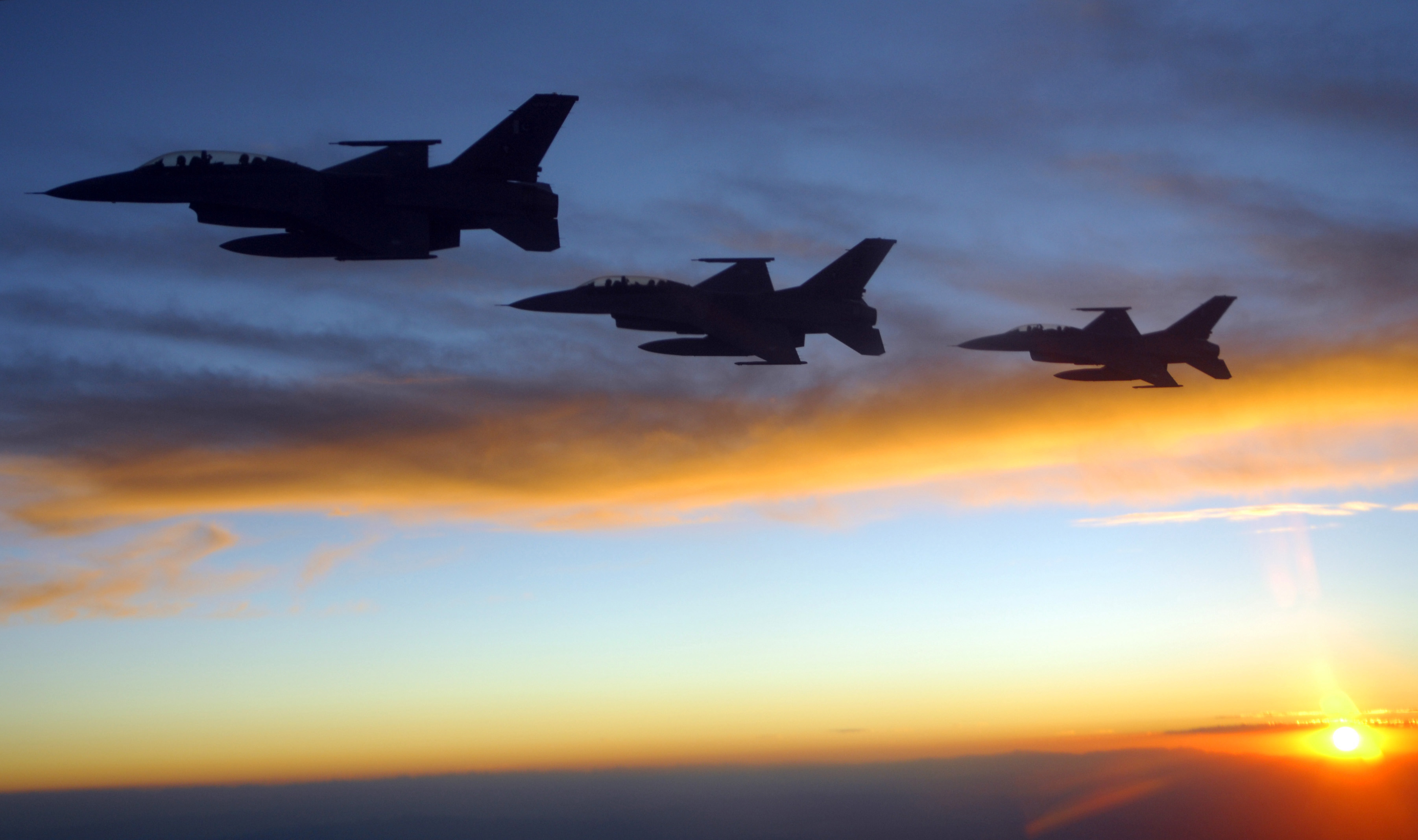
Griffins before the sunset

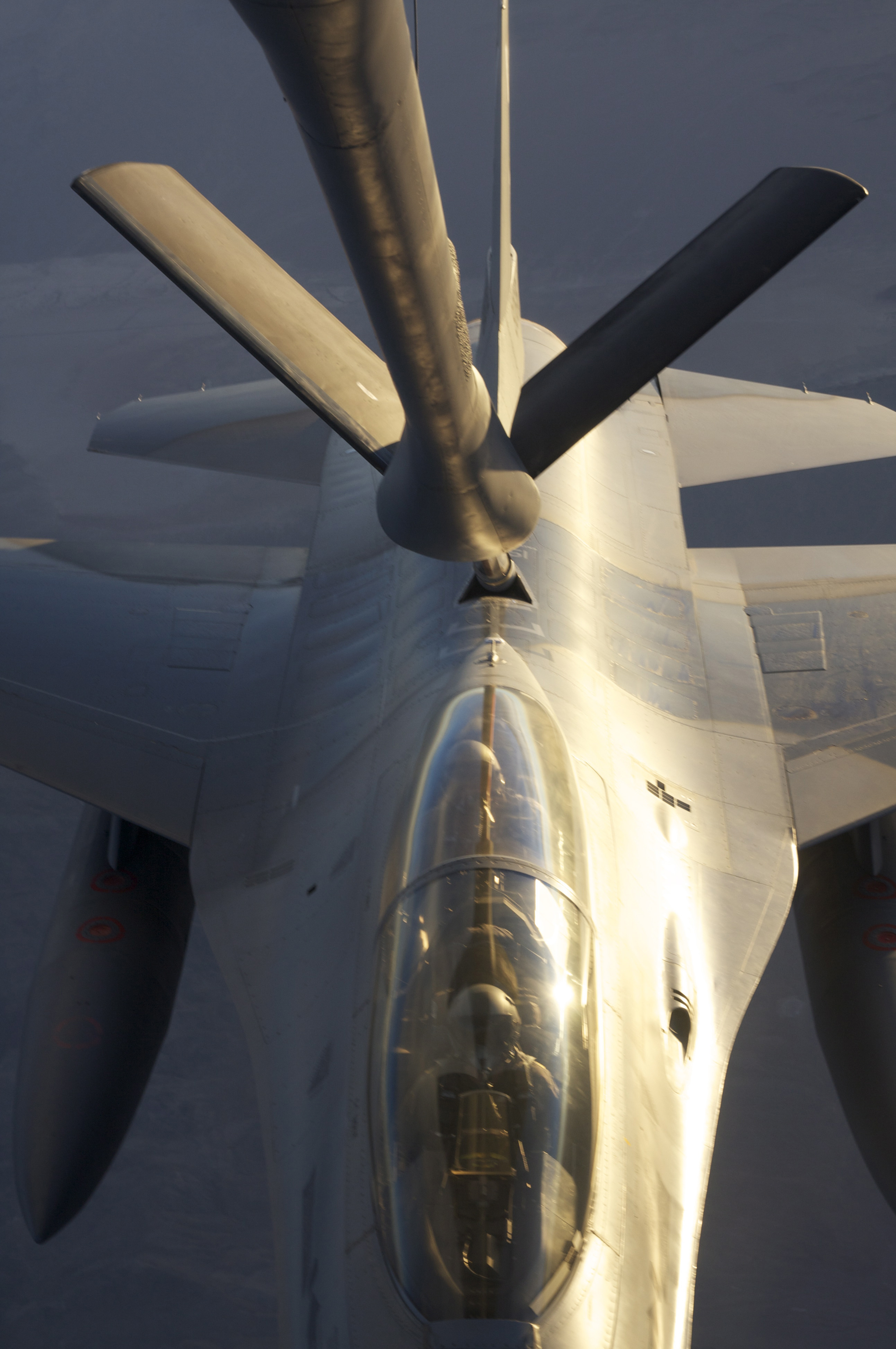
A Griffin takes on fuel from a USAF KC-135 tanker

== See also ==
- List of Pakistan Air Force squadrons
