= PAF Base Mushaf =

Air Force base in Punjab, Pakistan

PAF Base Mushaf
- پی اے ایف بیس مصحف
- Sargodha District, Punjab in Pakistan
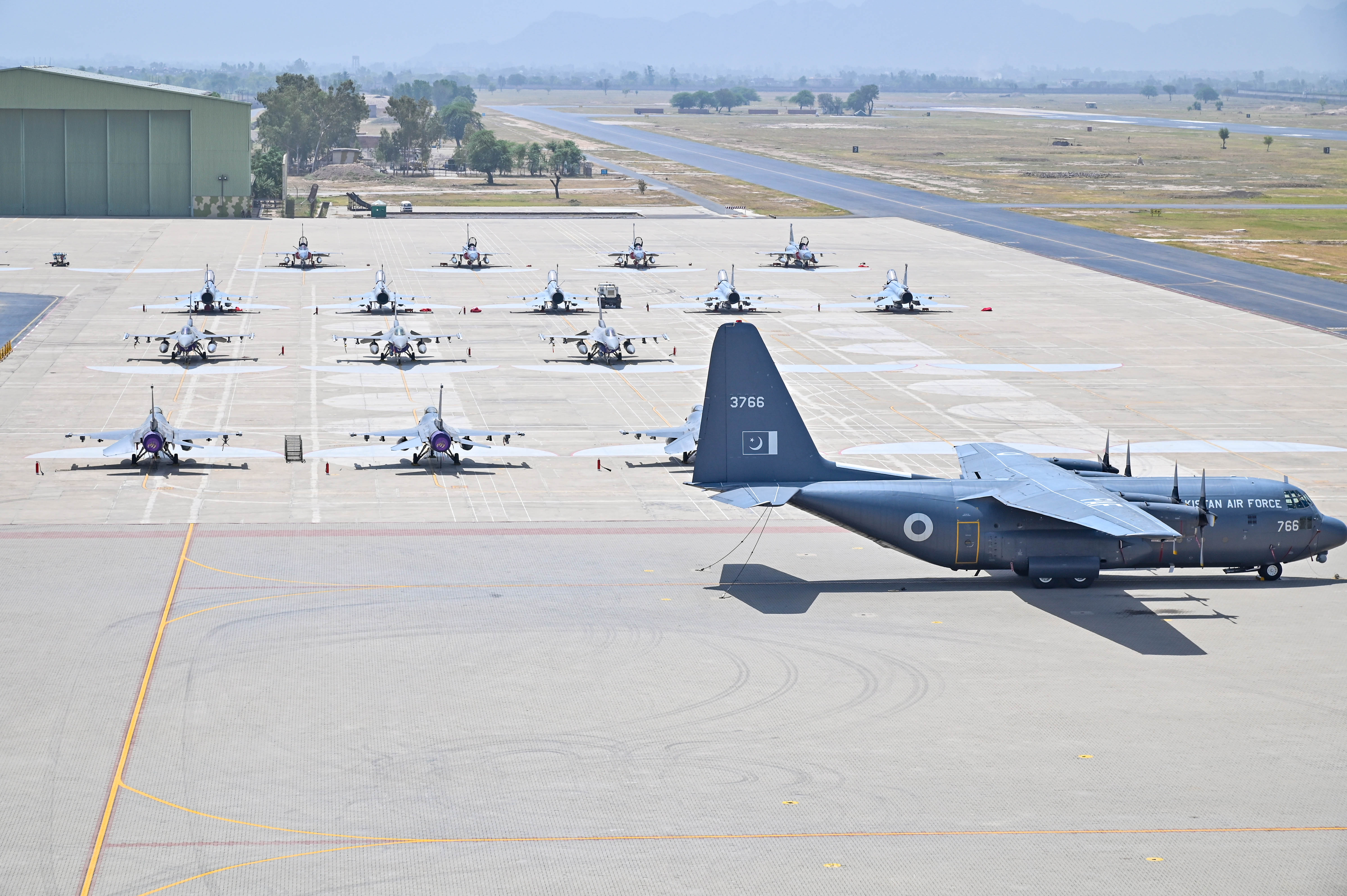
- Flight line of Mushaf airbase in 2024

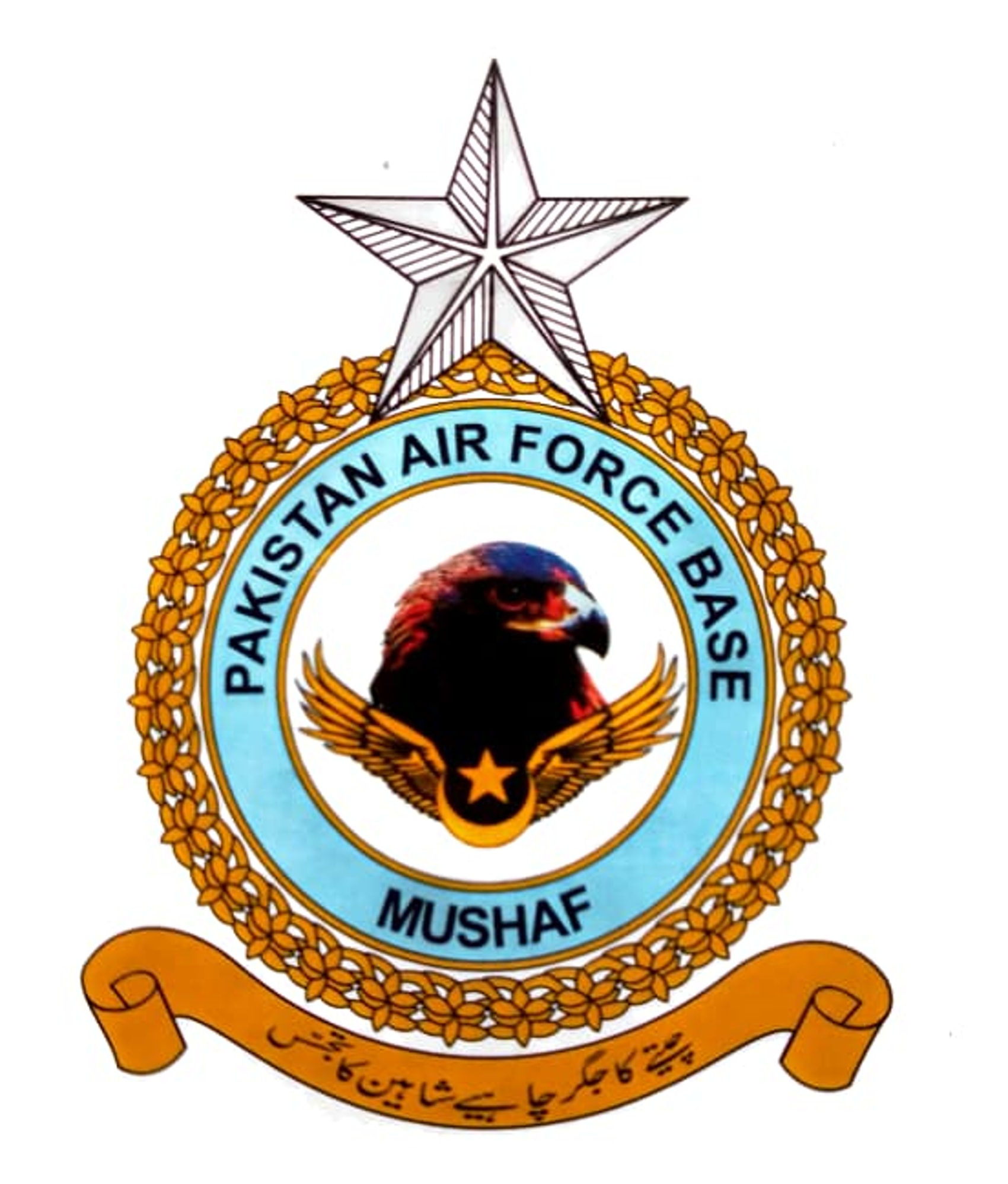

Site information
- Type: Air Force base
- Owner: Ministry of Defense
- Operator: Pakistan Air Force
- Controlled by: Central Air Command
- Condition: Operational
- Other site facilities: Combat Commanders' School
- Website: Pakistan Air Force

Location
- Shown within Punjab, Pakistan PAF Base Mushaf (Pakistan)
- Coordinates: 32°02′55″N 72°39′55″E

Site history
- Built: 1942
- Built for: British India; Pakistan Air Force
- Built by: British Raj (foundation)
- In use: 1942 - present
- Battles/wars: 1965 Indo-Pakistani war 1971 Indo-Pakistani war Operation Sentinel; Operation Swift Retort; 2025 India–Pakistan conflict

Garrison information
- Current commander: Air Commodore Hassan khalid
- Garrison: 38 MR Wing; Airpower Center of Excellence
- Occupants: 9 Squadron Griffins; 7 Squadron Bandits; 24 Squadron Blinders; 29 Squadron Aggressor; CCS JF-17 Dashings; CCS Mirage Skybolts; 82 CS Squadron Stallions; CCS f16

Airfield information
- Identifiers: IATA: SGI, ICAO: OPSR
- Elevation: 187 metres (614 ft) AMSL
Runways
Direction	Length and surface
14/32	3,120 metres (10,236 ft) Asphalt
06/24	2,430 metres (7,972 ft) Asphalt

Pakistan Air Force Base Mushaf or more simply PAF Base Mushaf (formerly PAF Station Sargodha and PAF Base Sargodha), IATA: SGI, ICAO: OPSR) is a Pakistan Air Force airbase situated at Sargodha in Punjab, Pakistan. It is designated as a "Major Operational Base" (MOB) by the PAF.

It was known as PAF Base Sargodha until 2003, when it was renamed in honour of the former Base Commander and Chief of the Air Staff Air Chief Marshal Mushaf Ali Mir, whose aircraft crashed on a routine flight near Kohat in February 2003.

The PAF's Central Air Command (CAC), the Combat Commanders' School (CCS), and the PAF Airpower Centre of Excellence (PAF ACE) are based at PAF Base Mushaf. It is the most elite and widely operational base in Pakistan, consisting of the highest equipped aircraft and squadrons and the best trained pilots and commanders.

== History ==
=== 1930s: Inception ===
PAF Base Mushaf was established sometime in 1942 during World War II. It later was one of the Sargodha Airfield Complex, and was known as Sargodha (Main). In 1959, the airstrip was commissioned as PAF Base Sargodha.

=== 1965: Indian air strikes ===
As a precursor to Indo-Pakistani war of 1965, on 28 August 1965, the Indian Air Force began "Operation Riddle" in response to Pakistan's Operation Grand Slam.On 6 September 1965, the operation shifted to targeting two cities in Punjab, which were Lahore and Kasur, sparking the needs for an airfield complex. From 1965, elements of the PAF's 17, 18, and 19 Squadrons were based in the airfield complex, which also housed the central command. This was considered one of the PAF's most heavily guarded location, being dense in assets of the air force. The complex was located on a strategic location, allowing Pakistan to conduct air offensives in the Punjab region. During peak operations, the complex housed up to 80 F-86 Sabres, and 5 Lockheed F-104 Starfighters.

Indian Air Force conducted the air raids on 6 and 7 September 1965. Squadron Leader Ajjamada B. Devaiah shot down a PAF F-104 before his aircraft crashed. Flt. Lt. Amjad Hussain ejected, but Sqn. Ldr. Deviah could not do so. A PAF F-86 was also destroyed on the ground. Meanwhile Sqn. Ldr MM Alam, engaged and shot down two Indian Hawker hunters. A total of five IAF aircraft were shot down on 7th September, two hunters and three Mystères.

In response, from 1965 to 1971, many disused airstrips were rehabilitated to be fitted with dummy aircraft, and were occasionally operating North American F-86 Sabres. Blast pens and dispersal sites were also built.

=== 1979: base for Mirage fighter jets ===
During 1979, the base was home to 5 Squadron with the Dassault Mirage IIIEP, another squadron with the Mirage IIIDP, another squadron with the Mirage IIIRP and 9 Squadron with the Dassault Mirage 5PA.

=== 2007: Suicide bombing by Islamist Jihadis ===
On 1 November 2007, a suicide bomber struck the 50-seat bus carrying PAF officers to nearby Kirana Ammunition Depot, killing 11 people (including 7 officers) and injuring 28. The bombing took place on Faisalabad Road, where a motorcycle loaded with explosives rammed the bus and triggered the blast. All the officers were new recruits posted to PAFB Mushaf for training. Attack was likely done by the elements of Pakistani Taliban and Al-Qaeda.

This was the last major attack before the 2007 state of emergency was imposed on the country.

=== 2025: Indian air and missile strikes ===
PAF Base Mushaf was struck by Indian retaliatory air and missile strikes as a part of Operation Sindoor during the 2025 India–Pakistan conflict on 10 May 2025. Indian military claimed to have used precision weapons to strike two sections of the runway. Later satellite imagery showed a crater on the runway.

== In popular media ==
- Sky Force (film), 2025 movie featuring Akshay Kumar, Veer Pahariya, Sara Ali Khan and Nimrat Kaur is based on Indian air raids on Sargodha airfield.

== See also ==
- List of Pakistan Air Force bases
- Sargodha Airfield Complex
- Sky Force (film), a 2025 Indian film about an attack on the base during the Indo-Pakistani war of 1965
