= PAF Base Lahore =

Military Airbase in Lahore

Coordinates: 31°32′59″N 74°20′37″E

- IATA: none; ICAO: none

Summary
- Airport type: Military
- Operator: Pakistan Air Force
- Location: Lahore, Punjab, Pakistan
- Interactive map of PAF Base Lahore

PAF Base Lahore is a non-flying Pakistan Air Force (PAF) base located in Lahore, Punjab, Pakistan. It is one of the oldest air force bases in Pakistan, originally functioning as a maintenance depot for the Royal Indian Air Force during the British Raj. After independence, it remained a small base used primarily for aircraft maintenance.

== History ==
In 1950, a transport squadron consisting of Dakotas and Bristol Freighters was moved to the base from Peshawar before eventually being relocated to Chaklala in 1960. From 1949 to 1959, an air force central medical board was also present at the base, responsible for medical certification of PAF aircrews.

Throughout the early 1950s, a University Air Squadron and the Shaheen Air Training Corps established their activities in Lahore for aviation education purposes and pilot recruitment programmes. The base also served as a regional control centre for aviation. In 1960, as part of efforts to make Lahore an air defence base, a number of observer units were shifted to the base. In 1961, for the first time, a Pakistan International Airlines (PIA) Super Constellation aircraft made its landing at the airport. The PAF loaned its northern hangar to the PIA to be converted into a civilian terminal building. The runway of the base was extended and improved to facilitate larger aircraft.

In 1978, with the arrival of radar technologies in the country, the Lahore base served as a center for training officers on using equipment. An air defence modernization school, now renamed Air Defence System School (ADSS) was established at the PAF Base Lahore in 1978, with a primary aim of imparting aviation training to PAF technicians, operators, engineers and controllers, which includes training courses on "high power radars, communication, uninterrupted power supply systems, power generators" and other equipment. The school was later shifted to Walton Airport in 1987 and then to PAF Base Mushaf, where it presently continues to function.

== Present use ==
There is an operations wing present at the base today which provides an all-year air defence cover. The Lahore air base is frequently used for receiving foreign air force dignitaries. Each year, Air Force Day celebrations are conducted at the base. The festivities attract a large number of spectators and retired PAF personnel. The Fazaia Inter College of the Pakistan Air Force is situated next to the base.
