= Tahir Rafique Butt =

Former Pakistan Air Force Chief

Tahir Rafique Butt NI(M) HI(M) SI(M) TBt
- طاھر رفیق بٹ

13th Chief of Air Staff (Pakistan)
- In office March 19, 2012 – March 19, 2015
- President: Mamnoon Hussain
- Prime Minister: Nawaz Sharif
- Preceded by: Rao Qamar Suleman
- Succeeded by: Sohail Aman

Personal details
- Born: 1955 (age 70–71)
- Website: www.paffalcons.com/cas/tahir-rafique-butt.php

Military service
- Allegiance: Pakistan
- Branch/service: Pakistan Air Force
- Years of service: 1977-2015
- Rank: Air Chief Marshal
- Unit: No. 1 Squadron (Rehbar)
- Commands: Chief of Air Staff; Director of the NAB (Kpk Branch); Southern Air Command; ACAS of PAF Personnel; ACAS Training; DCAS Personnel; PAF Base Lower Topa
- Battles/wars: 2001 India–Pakistan standoff 2008 India–Pakistan standoff War in North-West Pakistan
- Awards: Nishan-e-Imtiaz (Military); Hilal-e-Imtiaz (Military); Sitara-e-Imtiaz (Military); Tamgha-e-Basalat; Turkish Legion of Merit

Tahir Rafique Butt NI(M) HI(M) SI(M) TBt (Urdu:طاهر رفيق بٹ;b. 1955), is a retired air officer who was the 13th Chief of Air Staff of the Pakistan Air Force serving from 19 March 2012 to 19 March 2015. He was replaced by Air Chief Marshal Sohail Aman.

Before being appointed chief he served as Vice Chief of the Air Staff (VCAS) since 5 October 2010. His other appointments include Deputy Chief of the Air Staff at Air Headquarters and commanding an operational base.

== Biography ==
Tahir Rafique Butt was born in 1955 to a Kashmiri family, in Lahore, Punjab, Pakistan. He received his early education from the PAF Public School, a boarding school managed by the Air Force. After graduating from PAF Public School in 1973, he enrolled in Punjab University and attained BSc in Science in 1975. The same year, Butt's nomination was accepted at the Pakistan Air Force Academy after being interviewed by the Inter-Services Selection Board.

During his mid-officer career, Rafique studied at the National University of Modern Languages before transferring to Quaid-e-Azam University in 1993–94. From 1994 to 1995, he spent a semester at the Staff College in Turkey. From 2000 until 2001, Rafique continued his studies at National Defence University (NDU) where he gained his MSc in Defence and Strategic studies.

From December 2007 until July 2008, Rafique served as the Chief Instructor (CI) and commandant of the National Security College at NDU.

=== Career in Air Force ===
Tahir Butt graduated from the Air Force Academy on 6 March 1977 as a General Duty Pilot (GDP). He secured his commission as P/Off. and served in Sq. No 1 Rehbar on course of a Fighter Conversion Unit (FCU).

From 1977 to 1979, he served on various flight assignments and joined the Air Force Academy to instruct flying courses on fixed-wing aircraft. Sq. Ldr, he served on the combat units and flew with the No. 9 Griffins and No. 20 Eagles from 1983 to 1984. Butt also served as a military adviser to the Zimbabwean Air Force which he served from 1984 until 1986. Upon returning to Pakistan, Butt resumed the combat duty with the No. 18 War Hawks. In 1988, he was selected to join the Combat Commanders' School and graduated as a combat fighter in special operations. Eventually promoted as Wg Cdr, he commanded the No. 15 Cobras in 1990; during his service, he flew Mirage-III, F-7P, F-6S, T-37, SF-260, and MFI-17.

From 1990 to 1991, he commanded No. 19 Sherdils before being promoted to Gp. Capt to command the Rafiqui AFB.

=== Staff assignments ===
His staff assignment included the deputy director of Special Operations and Development at the AHQ from 1996 to 1999. Previously, he served as Additional Director on Special Operations at the Chaklala AFB in 1990. From 2000 to 2001, Rafique served as base commander of the PAF Base Lower Topa. Upon promoting to Air Cdre in 2001, Rafique served as ACAS of the Personnel; he also served as base commander of M.M. Alam AFB in Mianwali in 2002.

In 2005, his grade was promoted to two star rank and elevated as AVM in the Air Force. From 2005 until 2007, he served in the National Accountability Bureau (NAB) and directed the KpK branch. In 2009, he was promoted Air Marshal and became AOC of Southern Air Command which is headquartered in Karachi.

=== Chief of Air Staff ===
Prior to being appointed as chief of air staff, Rafique was serving as the VCAS at the AHQ.

At the time of retirement of ACM Rao Qamar Suleman, Rafique was most senior air marshal; his appointment came directly based on seniority. After much speculation, his four-star appointment was confirmed in the media. Earlier reports indicated that five air marshals had been in the race to become the next air chief. However, upholding the principle of seniority, the government chose Butt, similar to when the government appointed the new chief of naval staff, last year. On 7 March 2012, Butt's grade was promoted to four-star rank and elevated as the ACM; he assumed the charge of chief of air staff on 19 March 2012.

== Awards and decorations ==
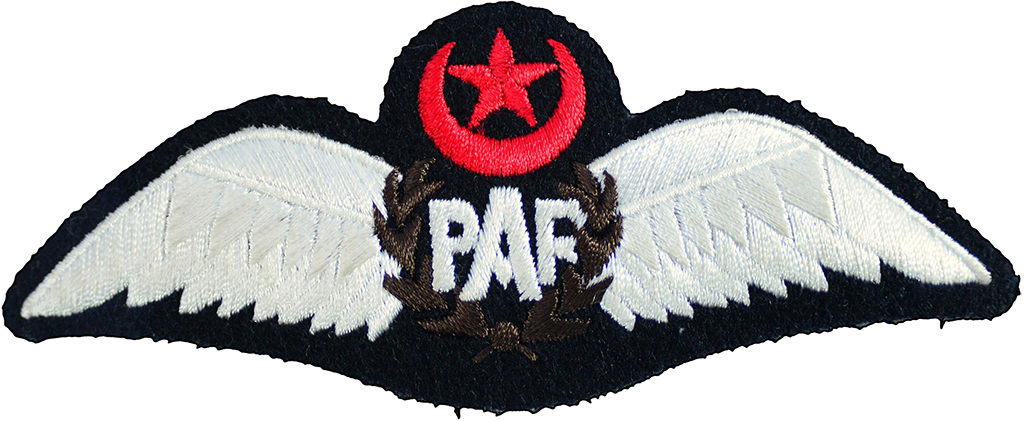

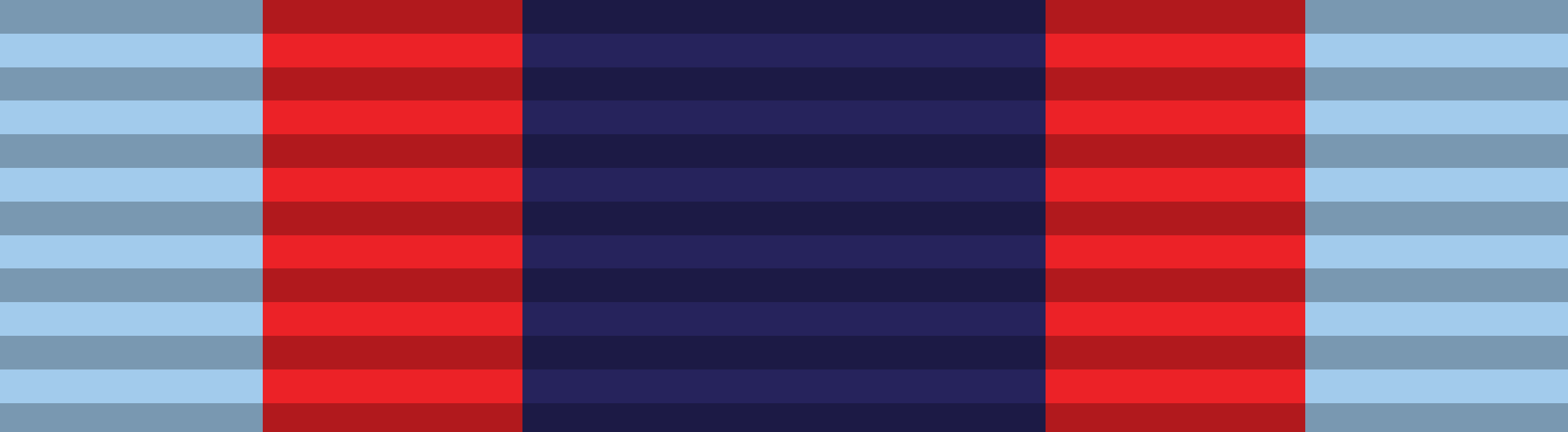

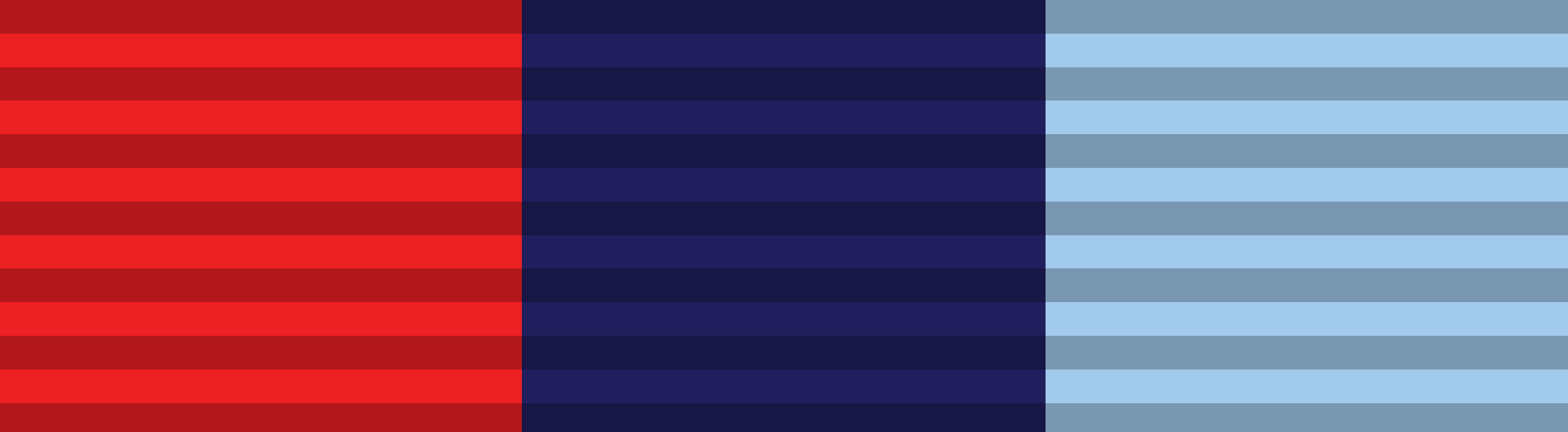

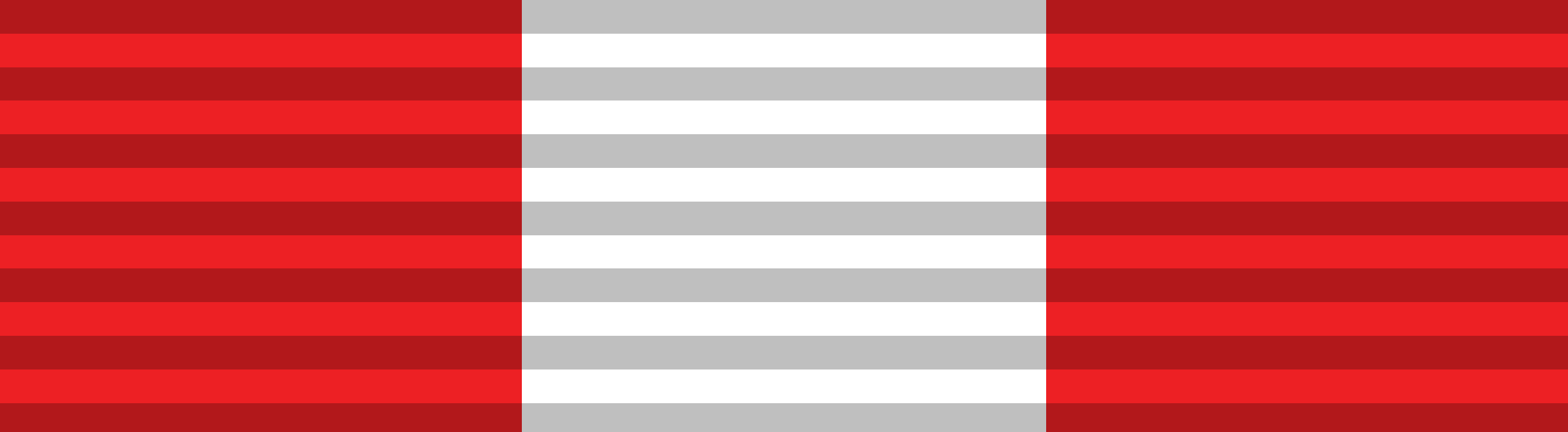

PAF GD(P) Badge RED (More than 3000 Flying Hours) Pilot Rating: Command Pilot
	Nishan-e-Imtiaz (Military) (Order of Excellence)		
Hilal-e-Imtiaz (Military) (Crescent of Excellence)	Sitara-e-Imtiaz (Military) (Star of Excellence)	Tamgha-e-Basalat (Medal of Good Conduct)	Tamgha-e-Baqa (Nuclear Test Medal) 1998
Tamgha-e-Istaqlal Pakistan (Escalation with India Medal) 2002	10 Years Service Medal	20 Years Service Medal	30 Years Service Medal
35 Years Service Medal	40 Years Service Medal	Tamgha-e-Sad Saala Jashan-e- Wiladat-e-Quaid-e-Azam (100th Birth Anniversary of Muhammad Ali Jinnah) 1976	Hijri Tamgha (Hijri Medal) 1979
Jamhuriat Tamgha (Democracy Medal) 1988	Qarardad-e-Pakistan Tamgha (Resolution Day Golden Jubilee Medal) 1990	Tamgha-e-Salgirah Pakistan (Independence Day Golden Jubilee Medal) 1997	The Legion of Merit (Turkey)

=== Foreign decorations ===
Foreign Award
Turkey	Turkish Legion of Merit

== Effective dates of promotion ==
Insignia	Rank	Date
	Air Chief Marshal	March 19, 2015
	Air Marshal	April 1, 2009
	Air Vice Marshal	December 2, 2005
	Air Commodore	June 14, 2001
	Group Captain	January 1, 1997
	Wing Commander	February 6, 1991
	Squadron Leader	September 7, 1986
	Flight Lieutenant	May 26, 1980
	Flying Officer	March 6, 1978
	Pilot Officer	March 6, 1977

== See also ==
- Chief of Air Staff (Pakistan)
- Shahid Lateef

Military offices
Preceded by Rao Qamar Suleman	Chief of Air Staff; 2012 – 2015	Succeeded by Suhail Aman
