= Sohail Aman =

Former Pakistan Air Force Chief

Sohail Aman NI(M) HI(M) SI(M) TI(M)
- سہیل امان
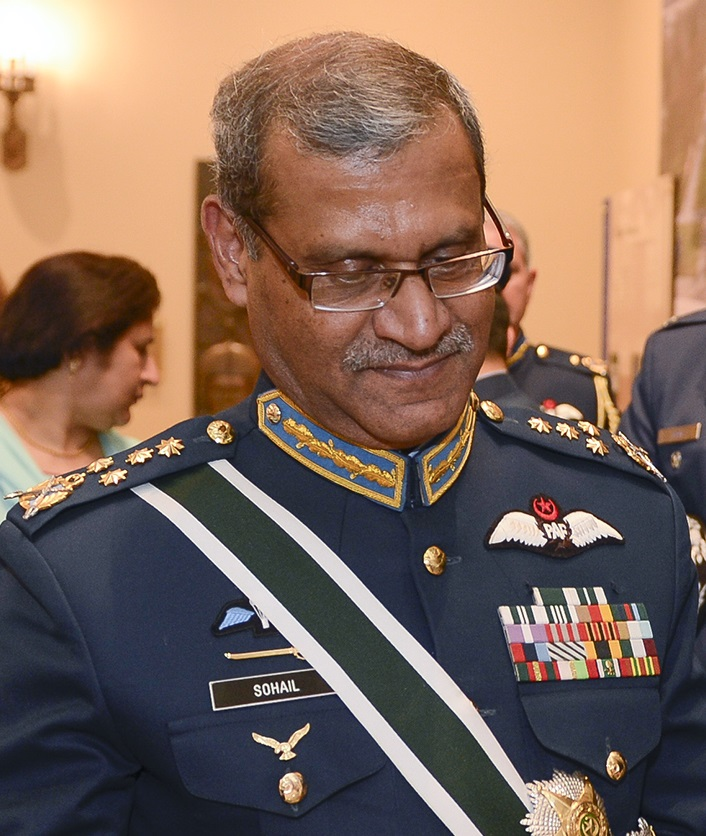

Chief of Air Staff
- In office 19 March 2015 – 18 March 2018
- President: Mamnoon Hussain
- Prime Minister: Nawaz Sharif; Shahid Khaqan Abbasi
- Preceded by: ACM Tahir Rafique Butt
- Succeeded by: ACM Mujahid Anwar Khan

Personal details
- Born: 10 June 1959 Lahore
- Spouse(s): Talat Sohail, Shagufta Jabeen
- Education: University of Karachi; King's College London

Military service
- Allegiance: Pakistan
- Branch/service: Pakistan Air Force
- Years of service: 1978–2018
- Rank: Air Chief Marshal
- Unit: Squadron No. 1 Rehbar
- Commands: Central Air Command; Southern Air Command; DCAS (Training & Evaluation); DCAS (Air Operations); PAF Base Minhas
- Battles/wars: 2001 India-Pakistan standoff 2008 Indo-Pakistan standoff War in North-West Pakistan
- Awards: Nishan-e-Imtiaz (Military); Hilal-e-Imtiaz (Military); Sitara-e-Imtiaz (Military); Tamgha-i-Imtiaz (Military); Kuwait Liberation Medal; Turkish Legion of Merit; Order of King Abdulaziz; Legion of Merit; CCS Instructor's Sword

Sohail Aman NI(M) HI(M) SI(M) TI(M) (Urdu: سہیل امان ; born 10 June 1959) is a retired four-star air officer who served as the Chief of Air Staff of the Pakistan Air Force. He took charge from Air Chief Marshal Tahir Rafique Butt on 19 March 2015. He retired on 18 March 2018, on completion of the three-year term as Air Chief.

== Biography ==
Sohail Aman was born in Lahore in 1959, and graduated from the PAF Public School in Sargodha in 1977. He is from a Muhajir family. In 1978, Aman joined the Pakistan Air Force, and graduated from the PAF Academy in Risalpur in 1980 where he gained commission as a Pilot Officer in GD(P) class.

Sohail Aman completed his early education from Govt. Central Model High School, Lower Mall, Lahore. He attended the elite Combat Commanders' School at Mushaf Air Force Base. Aman attended the Air War College in Karachi where he attained the master's degree in strategic studies, and later went to the United Kingdom where he attended the King's College London, graduating with MA in defence studies in 1980.

Besides flying F-16s in the Pakistan Air Force, ACM Sohail has also flown in a F-15s in Saudi Arabia and in a Tornado's in the United Kingdom in the form of joyrides.

== Awards and decorations ==
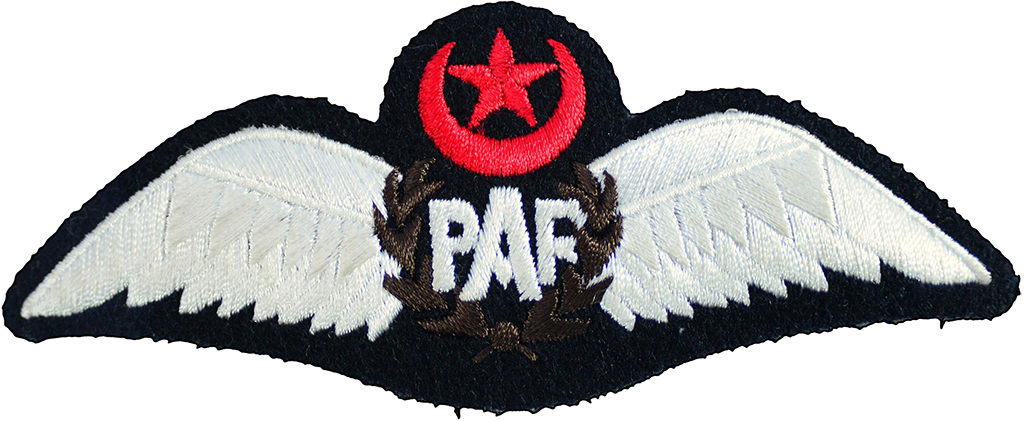

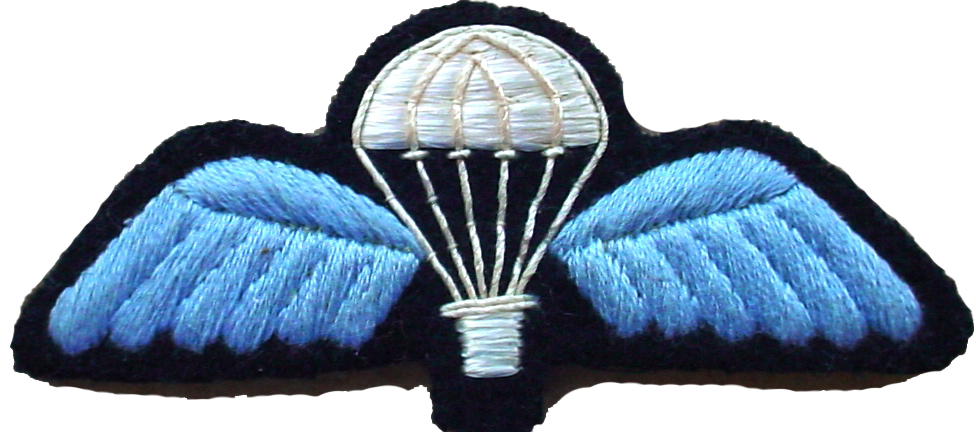

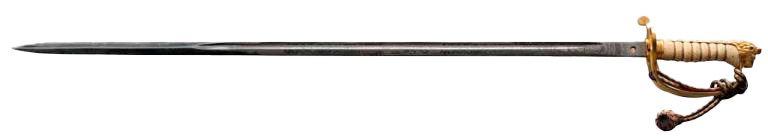

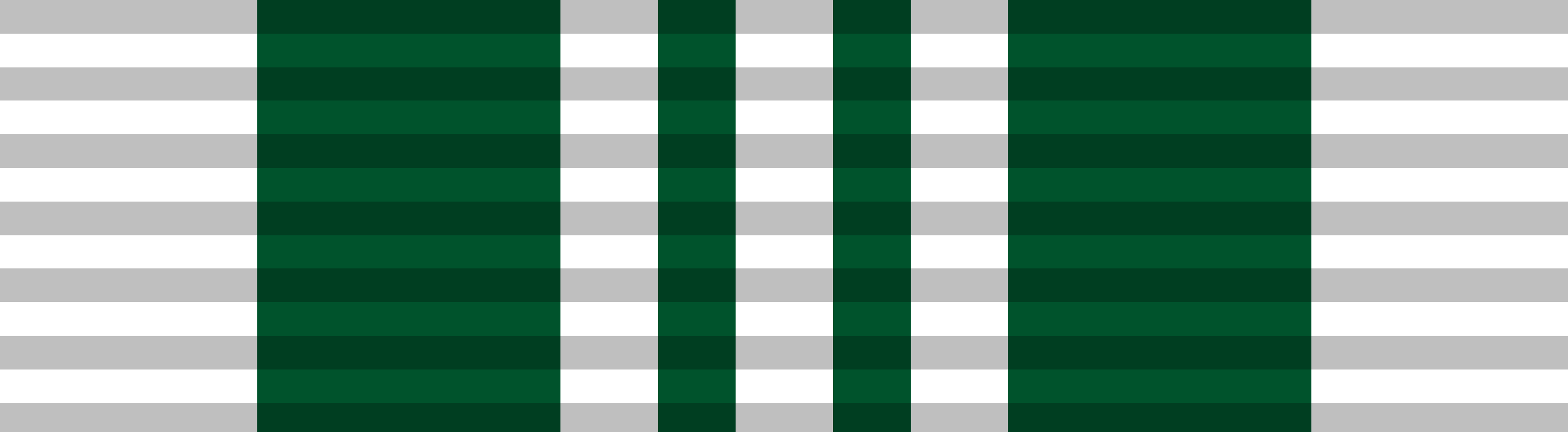

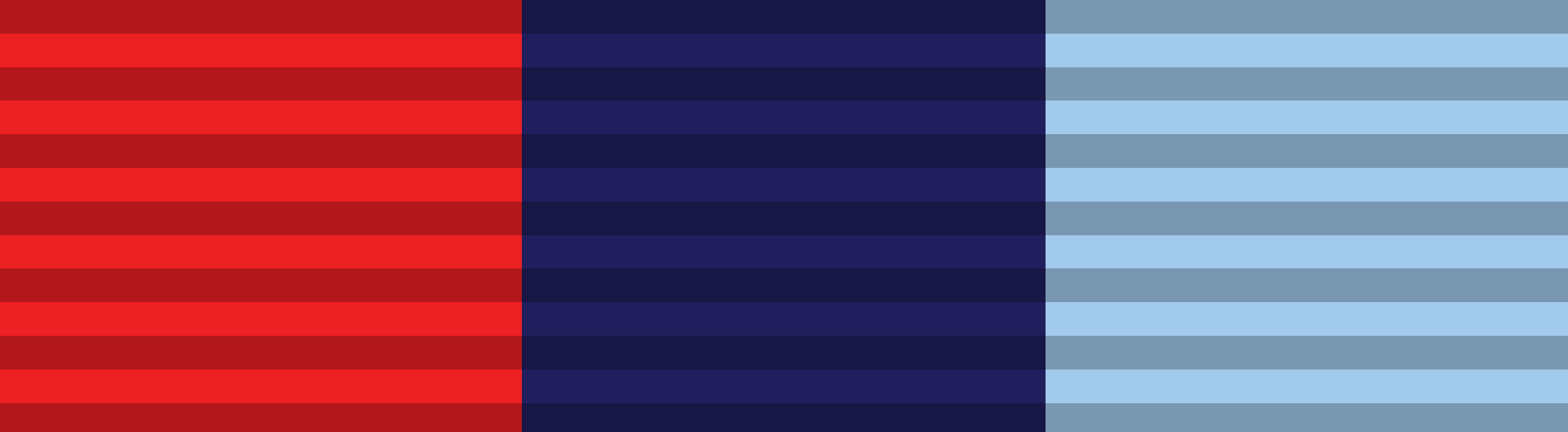

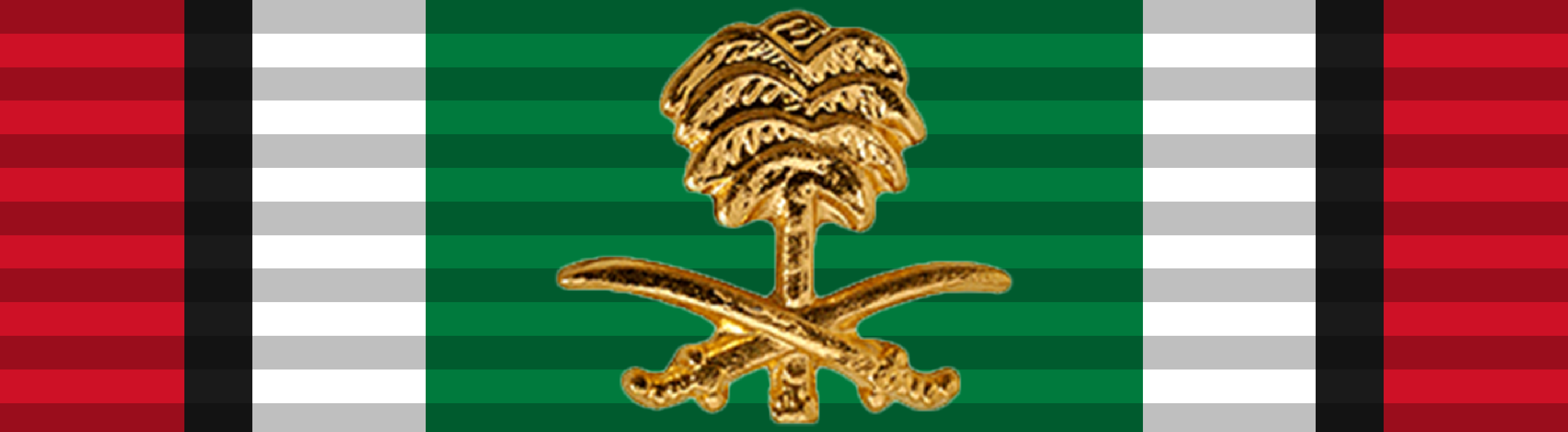

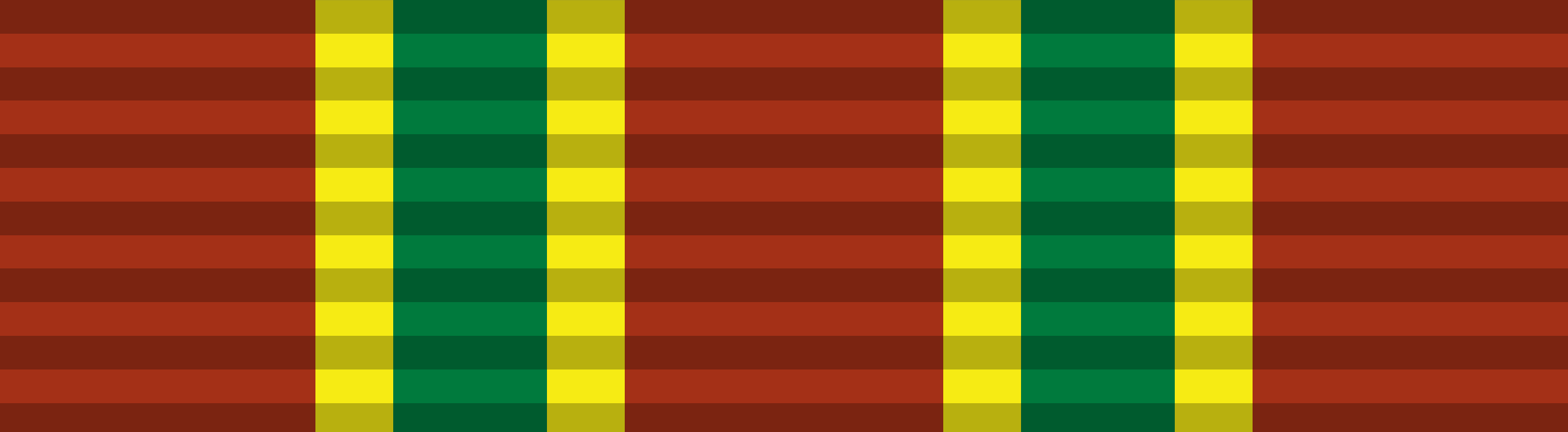

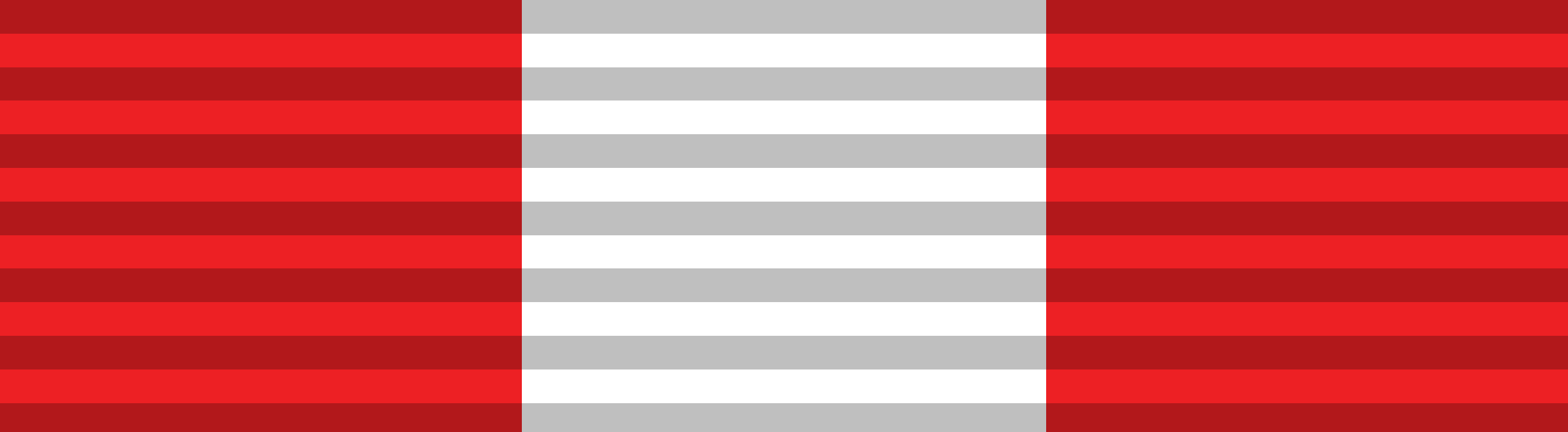

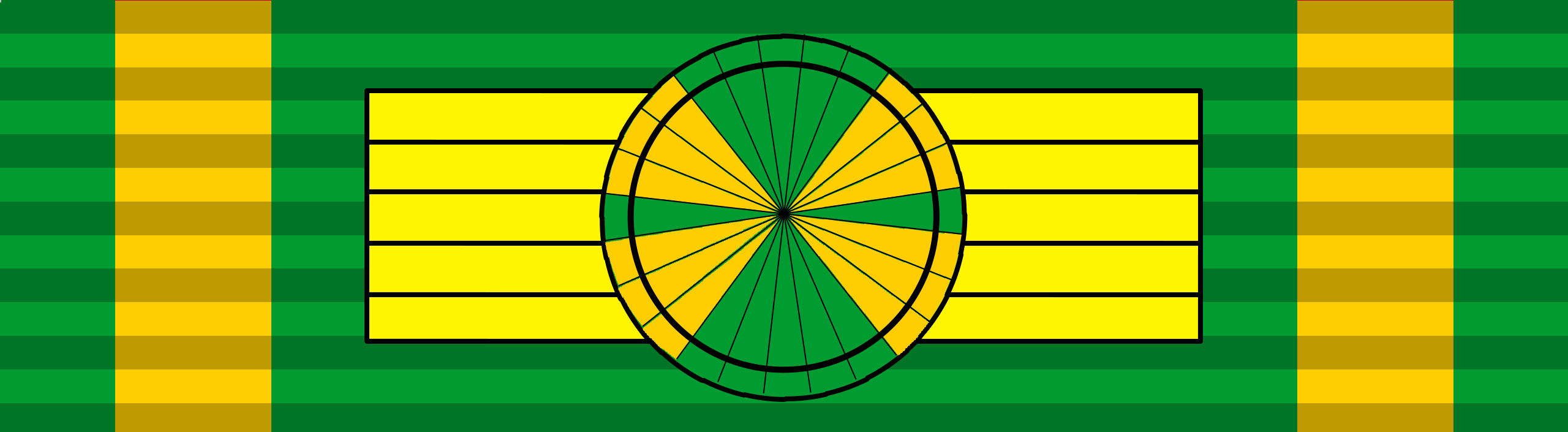

PAF GD(P) Badge RED (More than 3000 Flying Hours)
Parachutist Badge
Combat Commanders' School (CCS) Sargodha Instructor's Sword
	Nishan-e-Imtiaz (Military) (Order of Excellence) 2016		
Hilal-e-Imtiaz (Military) (Crescent of Excellence) 2013	Sitara-e-Imtiaz (Military) (Star of Excellence) 2006	Tamgha-e-Imtiaz (Military) (Medal of Excellence) 2000	Tamgha-e-Baqa (Nuclear Test Medal) 1998
Tamgha-e-Istaqlal Pakistan (Escalation with India Medal) 2002	10 Years Service Medal	20 Years Service Medal	30 Years Service Medal
35 Years Service Medal	40 Years Service Medal	Tamgha-e-Sad Saala Jashan-e- Wiladat-e-Quaid-e-Azam (100th Birth Anniversary of Muhammad Ali Jinnah) 1976	Hijri Tamgha (Hijri Medal) 1979
Jamhuriat Tamgha (Democracy Medal) 1988	Qarardad-e-Pakistan Tamgha (Resolution Day Golden Jubilee Medal) 1990	Tamgha-e-Salgirah Pakistan (Independence Day Golden Jubilee Medal) 1997	Kuwait Liberation Medal (Saudi Arabia) (Gulf War 1991)
Nuth al-Markat (Combat Medal) Saudi Arabia (Gulf War 1991)	Turkish Legion of Merit (Turkey) 2017	Order of King Abdul Aziz (1st Class) (Saudi Arabia) 2018	The Legion of Merit (Degree of Commander) (United States) 2018

=== Foreign decorations ===
Foreign Awards
Saudi Arabia	Kuwait Liberation Medal (Saudi Arabia) (Gulf War 1991)
Saudi Arabia	Nuth al-Markat (Combat Medal) (Gulf War 1991)
Turkey	Turkish Legion of Merit
Saudi Arabia	Order of King Abdul Aziz (1st Class)
United States	The Legion of Merit (Degree of Commander)

== Effective dates of promotions ==
Insignia	Rank	Date
	Air chief marshal	18 March 2015
	Air marshal	5 July 2013
	Air vice marshal	10 July 2009
	Air commodore	20 June 2005
	Group captain	14 June 2001
	Wing commander	11 October 1994
	Squadron leader	6 February 1992
	Flight lieutenant	23 September 1983
	Flying officer	28 March 1981
	Pilot officer	28 March 1980

== See also ==
- Shahid Lateef
- Pakistan Air Force

Military offices
Preceded by Tahir Rafique Butt	Chief of Air Staff; 19 March 2015 – 18 March 2018	Succeeded by Mujahid Anwar Khan
