= Vice Chief of the Air Staff (Pakistan) =

Position within the Pakistani Air Force

- وائس چیف آف ایئر سٹاف
- Incumbent; Zaffar Aslam
- Pakistan Air Force
- Type: Second-in-command of Pakistan Air Force
- Abbreviation: C.O.S. (1949-1964; 1970-1972); DCAS (1964-1970; 1972-1979); VCAS (1979-present)
- Reports to: Commander-in-Chief (1947-1972); Chief of the Air Staff (since 1972)
- Seat: Air Headquarters, Islamabad
- Deputy: Deputy Chief of the Air Staff

The Vice Chief of the Air Staff (VCAS) is the second-in-command of the Pakistan Air Force and reports to the Chief of the Air Staff. Since 1979, it has been held by an Air Marshal, a three-star rank air force officer, who is responsible for flight safety, intelligence, procurement, public relations, and the PAF Air War College.

== History ==
Traditionally, the deputy has served as the air chief's principal assistant, overseeing the routine administration of Air Force operations. While there are limitations on the authority of the Deputy with respect to the development of policies, the Deputy handles many of the substantial administrative tasks with which air chiefs are encumbered. This allows the air chief to focus on the larger and more numerous areas of responsibility.

According to Rule 31-A of the Pakistan Air Force Act Rules, 1957: "Authorities empowered to order dismissal or removal of persons other than officers and warrant officers:- The (Vice Chief of Air Staff), Pakistan Air Force, may at any time dismiss or remove from the service any person subject to this Act other than an officer or warrant officer."

Over the years, the title used to refer to the second-in-command of the PAF has changed from chief of staff (Note: From 1948 to 1964, and in 1969.) to deputy chief of air staff, (Note: From 1964 to 1979.) and since 1979 as vice chief of air staff. Similarly, the rank of the deputy also increased from air commodore to air vice-marshal, and ultimately air-marshal. Throughout the first 40 years of the PAF, 19 individuals had served as vice chiefs; however, Air Marshal Farooq Feroze Khan was the first to succeed an outgoing chief of air staff.

=== Chiefs of Staff (1949-1964; 1970-1972) ===
| No. | Name | Appointment date | Left office | Chief |
|---|---|---|---|---|
| 1 | Air Commodore; Douglas Lloyd Almot | April 1949 | May 1951 | Richard Atcherley |
| 2 | Air Commodore; GB Keily | May 1951 | September 1952 | Leslie William Cannon |
| 3 | Air Commodore; LE Jarman | September 1952 | December 1954 | Leslie William Cannon |
| 4 | Air Commodore; Haider Raza | 20 December 1954 | 20 June 1957 | Leslie William Cannon; Arthur McDonald |
| 5 | Air Commodore; Maqbool Rabb | 21 June 1957 | 24 March 1959 | Arthur McDonald; Asghar Khan |
| 6 | Air Vice Marshal; M. A. Rahman | 29 March 1959 | 25 November 1964 | Asghar Khan |
| 7 | Air Vice Marshal; S. A. Yusuf (Note: Air Vice Marshal Yusuf served concurrently as Chief of Staff from 1969 to 1970 alongside Deputy Chief of Air Staff Khyber Khan.) | 1 May 1969 | 28 February 1970 | Abdur Rahim Khan |
| 8 | Air Vice Marshal; Eric G. Hall | 1 April 1970 | 3 June 1972 | Abdur Rahim Khan; Zafar Chaudhry |

=== Deputy Chief of Air Staff (1964-1970; 1972-1979) ===
| No. | Name | Appointment date | Left office | Chief |
|---|---|---|---|---|
| 1 | Air Vice-Marshal; Mohammad Akhtar | 26 November 1964 | 8 April 1966 | Asghar Khan; Nur Khan |
| 2 | Air Commodore; S. A. Yusuf | 9 April 1966 | 18 April 1967 | Nur Khan |
| 3 | Air Vice-Marshal; Abdul Qadir | 19 April 1967 | 13 January 1969 | Nur Khan; Abdur Rahim Khan |
| 4 | Air Vice-Marshal; Khyber Khan | 1 February 1969 | 19 March 1970 | Abdur Rahim Khan |
| 5 | Air Vice-Marshal; Saeedullah Khan | 22 June 1972 | 29 June 1973 | Zafar Chaudhry |
| 6 | Air Vice-Marshal; Chaudhary Rab Nawaz | 21 July 1973 | 12 May 1974 | Zafar Chaudhry; Zulfiqar Ali Khan |
| 7 | Air Vice-Marshal; Michael John O'Brian | 13 May 1974 | 31 August 1975 | Zulfiqar Ali Khan |
| 8 | Air Vice-Marshal; M. Mahmood Hasan | 1 September 1975 | 22 July 1978 | Zulfiqar Ali Khan |

=== Vice Chief of Air Staff (1979—present) ===
| No. | Name | Appointment date | Left office | Chief of Air Staff | Ref. |
|---|---|---|---|---|---|
| 1 | Air Marshal; Ayaz Ahmed Khan | 10 August 1979 | 21 July 1981 | Anwar Shamim | |
| 2 | Air Marshal; A Rashid Shaikh | 22 July 1981 | April 1984 | Anwar Shamim | |
| 3 | Air Marshal; Jamal A. Khan | April 1984 | March 1985 | Anwar Shamim | |
| 4 | Air Marshal; Shabbir Hussain Syed | March 1985 | March 1988 | Jamal A. Khan | |
| 5 | Air Marshal; Farooq Feroze Khan | March 1988 | December 1989 | Hakimullah Khan Durrani | |
| 6 | Air Marshal; Syed Masood Hatif | February 1990 | July 1993 | Hakimullah Khan Durrani; Farooq Feroze Khan | |
| 7 | Air Marshal; Shafique Haider | July 1993 | November 1994 | Farooq Feroze Khan | |
| 8 | Air Marshal; Muhammad Arshad Chaudhry | December 1994 | January 1997 | Abbas Khattak | |
| 9 | Air Marshal; Pervaiz Mehdi Qureshi | May 1997 | November 1997 | Abbas Khattak | |
| 10 | Air Marshal; Aliuddin | December 1997 | November 1999 | Pervaiz Mehdi Qureshi | |
| 11 | Air Marshal; Salim Arshad | ? | 22 November 2002 | Mushaf Ali Mir | |
| 12 | Air Marshal; Syed Qaiser Hussain | 23 November 2002 | ? | Mushaf Ali Mir | |
| 13 | Air Marshal; Raashid Kalim | 30 March 2006 | 15 November 2007 | Tanvir Mahmood Ahmed | |
| 14 | Air Marshal; Shahid Lateef | 16 November 2007 | 28 March 2009 | Tanvir Mahmood Ahmed | |
| 15 | Air Marshal; Hifazat Ullah Khan | 29 March 2009 | 4 October 2010 | Rao Qamar Suleman | |
| 16 | Air Marshal; Tahir Rafique Butt | 5 October 2010 | 18 March 2012 | Rao Qamar Suleman | |
| 17 | Air Marshal; Farhat Hussain Khan | 9 June 2012 | 3 July 2013 | Tahir Rafique Butt | |
| 18 | Air Marshal; Syed Athar Hussain Bukhari | 4 July 2013 | 6 August 2014 | Tahir Rafique Butt | |
| 19 | Air Marshal; Sohail Gul | 7 August 2014 | 10 April 2015 | Tahir Rafique Butt; Sohail Aman | |
| 20 | Air Marshal; Saeed Muhammad Khan | 11 April 2015 | 2 July 2016 | Sohail Aman | |
| 21 | Air Marshal; Asad Abdur Rehman Lodhi | 3 July 2016 | 5 October 2017 | Sohail Aman | |
| 22 | Air Marshal; Farooq Habib | 6 October 2017 | 25 March 2018 | Sohail Aman; Mujahid Anwar Khan | |
| 23 | Air Marshal; Arshad Malik | 26 March 2018 | 3 November 2018 | Mujahid Anwar Khan | |
| 24 | Air Marshal; Aasim Zaheer | 4 November 2018 | 17 January 2020 | Mujahid Anwar Khan | |
| 25 | Air Marshal; Ahmer Shehzad Leghari | 18 January 2020 | 25 March 2021 | Mujahid Anwar Khan; Zaheer Ahmad Babar | |
| 26 | Air Marshal; Syed Noman Ali | 26 March 2021 | 20 March 2022 | Zaheer Ahmad Babar | |
| 27 | Air Marshal; Zahid Mehmood | 21 March 2022 | 2024 | Zaheer Ahmad Babar | |
| 28 | Air Marshal; Hamid Rashid Randhawa | 2024 | 2025 | Zaheer Ahmad Babar | |
| 29 | Zaffar Aslam | 2025 | Incumbent | Zaheer Ahmed Babar | |

== See also ==
- Vice Chief of the Army Staff (Pakistan)
- Vice Chief of the Naval Staff (Pakistan)
