= S. A. Yusuf =

Pakistani Chief of Staff (1921-1996)

S. A. Yusuf SBt
- ایس اے یوسف

7th Chief of Staff Pakistan Air Force
- In office 1 May 1969 – 28 February 1970 Serving with Khyber Khan (Deputy Chief of Air Staff)
- Commander-in-Chief: Air Marshal Nur Khan (1965-1969); Air Marshal Abdur Rahim Khan (1969-1972)
- Preceded by: M. A. Rahman
- Succeeded by: Eric G. Hall

2nd Deputy Chief of Air Staff Pakistan Air Force
- In office 9 April 1966 – 18 April 1967
- Commander-in-Chief: Air Marshal Nur Khan (1965-1969)
- Preceded by: Mohammad Akhtar
- Succeeded by: Abdul Qadir

2nd Commandant, PAF Staff College
- In office January 1962 – December 1964

Personal details
- Born: Stephen Aratoon Joseph; 27 March 1921
- Died: 24 December 1996 (aged 75)
- Education: Lawrence College Ghora Gali; Government College, Lahore; No. 1 (I) SFTS

Military service
- Branch/service: Royal Indian Air Force (1941-1947); Pakistan Air Force (1947-1972)
- Years of service: 1941–1972
- Rank: Air Vice Marshal
- Commands: PAF Staff College; PAF Station Mauripur; RPAF Station Peshawar
- Battles/wars: India–Pakistan war of 1947–1948

Stephen Aratoon Joseph (Note: Urdu: اسٹیفن اراتون جوزف) (27 March 1921 — 24 December 1996) also known as S. A. Joseph and S. A. Yusuf or S. A. Yusaf, was a Pakistani two-star rank air officer who was among the pioneers of the Pakistan Air Force. He served as the second Deputy Chief of Air Staff from April 1966 to April 1967 and seventh Chief of Staff from May 1969 to February 1970. He later served as Pakistan's Ambassador to Czechoslovakia in late 1978.

== Early life and education ==
Stephen Aratoon Joseph was born on 27 March 1921 in Peshawar. He received his education from the Lawrence College Ghora Gali and Government College, Lahore.

== Service years ==
=== Royal Indian Air Force (1941-1947) ===
He was commissioned into the Royal Indian Air Force (RIAF) on 10 November 1941 from the 9th course of the No. 1 (I) SFTS.

Pilot Officer Joseph took off in an Lysander II on a test flight on 21 May 1942 and tried to land in coarse pitch. The aircraft overshot and Joseph tried to go around by opening up the throttle. The aircraft stalled and crashed, seriously injuring Joseph. His passenger Aircraftman 1st Class Ernest Foxall of No. 28 Squadron RIAF died from his injuries.

=== Pakistan Air Force (1947-1972) ===
After the Partition of British India on 14 August 1947, Flying Officer Joseph opted for the Royal Pakistan Air Force (RPAF). He was awarded the Tamgha-e-Diffa with the Kashmir 1948 clasp for his role in the India–Pakistan war of 1947–1948.

Since partition, he served as officer commanding and chief flying instructor at PAF College, senior air staff officer, director of operations, recruiting and plans. He was also the president of Services Selection Board. He commanded RPAF Station Peshawar in April 1952. Group Captain Joseph was the first deputy commandant of the PAF Staff College from September 1958 to March 1959. He was promoted to the rank of air commodore on 30 March 1959 and appointed assistant chief of air staff at Air Headquarters.

He served as the second commandant of the PAF Staff College from January 1962 to December 1964. He was appointed Assistant Chief of Air Staff (Training) in January 1965. After the India–Pakistan war of 1965, he was appointed as the Commander of the newly raised Air Defence Operations Command in Peshawar. Air Commodore Sajad Haider described him as, "a gentleman, articulate but did not want any waves in the smooth environs of his corridors."

He was the deputy chief of air staff from 9 April 1966 to 18 April 1967. In the January 1969 issue of Flight, John Fricker reported that Air Vice Marshal Yusuf was the commander of HQ Operational Command which controlled all the combat elements of the Air Force.

Air Vice Marshal Yusuf served concurrently as chief of staff from 1 May 1969 to 28 February 1970 alongside Deputy Chief of Air Staff Khyber Khan. In June 1969, a few months after the ouster of President Ayub Khan and the establishment of General Yahya Khan's regime, Air Adviser Group Captain G. B. Johns submitted a paper to the Ministry of Defence detailing the PAF's role within the country's political landscape. He reported that Yusuf was the AOC operations command and "nominally in charge" in the absence of commander-in-chief, Air Marshal Nur Khan.

== Personal life ==
He converted to Islam and changed his name to S. A. Yusuf. He married a Muslim woman.

== Later life and death ==
He assumed the office of Ambassador of Pakistan to Czechoslovakia on 12 December 1978.

He died on 24 December 1996.
