= Abbas Khattak =

Chief of Air Staff of Pakistan from 1994 to 1997

Abbas Khattak NI(M) HI(M) SI(M) SBt
- عباس خٹک

Chief of Air Staff
- In office 8 November 1994 – 7 November 1997
- Preceded by: ACM Farooq Feroze Khan
- Succeeded by: ACM Parvaiz Mehdi Qureshi

President of Pakistan Squash Federation
- In office 1997–1998

Personal details
- Born: Mohammad Abbas Khattak; 16 July 1943 (age 83) Jehangira, NWFP in British Sub continent (Present-day in Nowshera, Khyber-Pakhtunkhwa in Pakistan)
- Nickname: Muhammad Abbas Khattak

Military service
- Allegiance: Pakistan
- Branch/service: Pakistan Air Force
- Years of service: 1960 – 1997
- Rank: Air Chief Marshal
- Unit: No. 19 Squadron (S/No. PAK/4385)
- Commands: DCAS (Operations); DCAS (Training); AOC Southern Air Command
- Battles/wars: Indo-Pakistani War of 1965; Indo-Pakistani War of 1971
- Awards: Nishan-e-Imtiaz (Military); Hilal-e-Imtiaz (Military); Sitara-e-Imtiaz (Military); Sitara-e-Basalat; Order of Military Merit (Jordan)

Mohammad Abbas Khattak NI(M) HI(M) SI(M) SBt (Urdu: عباس خٹک ; born: 16 July 1943) is a four-star rank air force officer in the Pakistan Air Force who served as the Chief of Air Staff (CAS) from 8 November 1994 until his retirement on 7 November 1997.

== Biography ==
Abbas Khattak was born in Peshawar, NWFP on 16 July 1943. He was educated at the Cadet College Hasan Abdal (Aurangzeb Wing) , and joined the Pakistan Air Force in 1960, from which he was directed to attend the famed Pakistan Air Force Academy in Risalpur. He passed out with the class of 35th GD(P), and gained commission on 20 January 1963 in No. 19 Squadron Sherdils.

P/Off. Khattak was trained to fly the F-86 Sabre and took participation in the various combat missions during the second war with India in 1965. During this time, F/Off. was among the eight fighter pilots who were selected to take part in famous aerial raid on Pathankot Air Force Station in India, a squadron commanded by then-Squadron Leader Sajad Haider. In 1970–71, Sq-Ldr. Khattak was posted with the Eastern Command in East-Pakistan, leading several mission against the Indian Air Force but was reposted in Sargodha Air Force Base before his country's surrender in Eastern Front of the third war with India in 1971.

After the war, Wg-Cdr. Khattak was directed to attend the war course at the National Defence University in Islamabad.

In 1988, Air-Commodore Khattak was appointed as AOC of the Southern Air Command, serving until 1990. In 1991, AVM Khattak was posted to the Air Headquarters (AHQ) in Islamabad as DCAS (Training), where he played a pioneering role in aviation and flight safety programs. In 1994, Air-Marshal Khattak was promoted to DCAS (Operations) at AHQ.

== Chief of Air Staff ==
On 8 November 1994, Prime Minister Benazir Bhutto approved the promotion papers of Air-Mshl. Khattak to be promoted to the four-star rank, Air Chief Marshal. This promotion was controversial since Air-Mshl. Khattak superseded two senior air officers: Air-Mshl. Shafique Haider (the Vice Chief of the Air Staff), and Air-Mshl. Dilawar Hussain (Chairman PAC). The reason this appointment was highly controversial is because the departing Chief of Air Staff Farooq Feroze Khan struck a deal behind closed doors with Benazir and Zardari to appoint him as the Joint Chief of Staff and in exchange he would allow Zardari to promote Khattak as the Chief of Air Staff. Khattak and Zardari have been accused of receiving millions of dollars in kickback from a Mirage deal.

During his tenureship as air chief, ACM Khattak made attempts to acquire the Mirage-2000 from Qatar but vetoed the acquisition of MiG-29F and the Su-27 aircraft from the Eastern Europe, despite the strong backing of the then-Chairman joint chiefs, ACM Feroze Khan, due to their poor war performances. During his tenure, Pakistan worked with China to develop the K-8 Karakorum. After his retirement he was succeeded by Air Chief Marshal PQ Mehdi.

He is married and has two sons.

== Awards and decorations ==
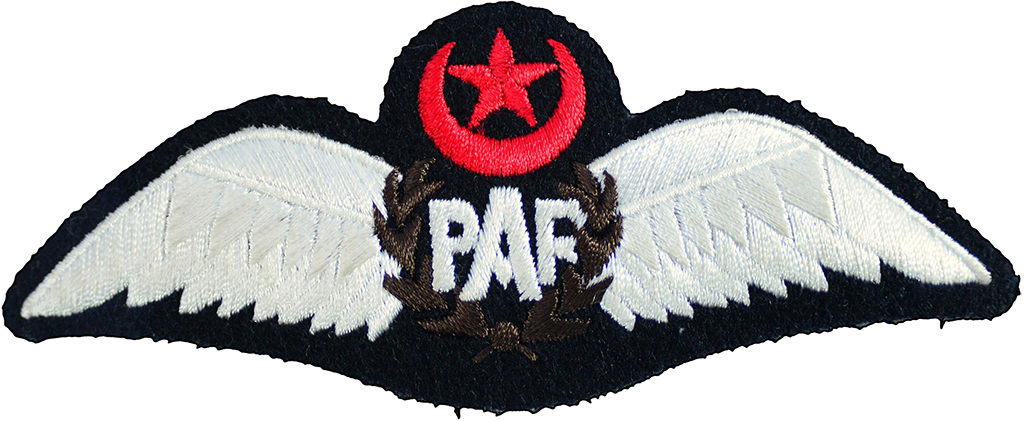

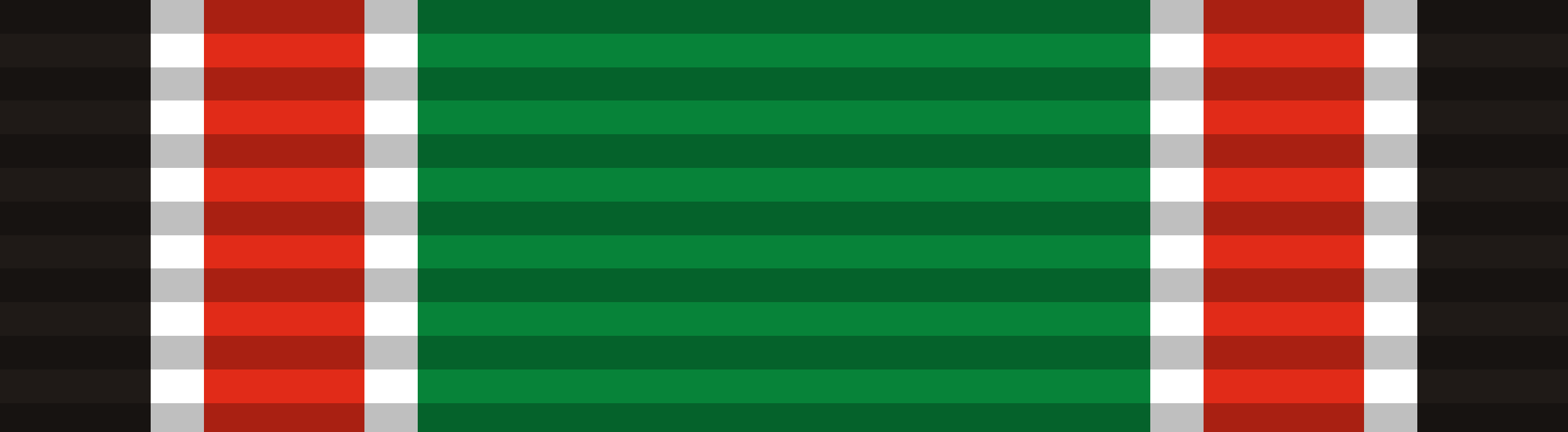

PAF GD(P) Badge RED (More than 3000 Flying Hours)
Nishan-e-Imtiaz (Military) (Order of Excellence)		Hilal-e-Imtiaz (Military) (Crescent of Excellence)	
Sitara-e-Imtiaz (Military) (Star of Excellence)	Sitara-e-Basalat (Star of Good Conduct)	Tamgha-e-Diffa (General Service Medal)	Sitara-e-Harb 1965 War (War Star 1965)
Sitara-e-Harb 1971 War (War Star 1971)	Tamgha-e-Jang 1965 War (War Medal 1965)	Tamgha-e-Jang 1971 War (War Medal 1971)	10 Years Service Medal
20 Years Service Medal	30 Years Service Medal	Tamgha-e-Sad Saala Jashan-e- Wiladat-e-Quaid-e-Azam (100th Birth Anniversary of Muhammad Ali Jinnah) 1976	Hijri Tamgha (Hijri Medal) 1979
Jamhuriat Tamgha (Democracy Medal) 1988	Qarardad-e-Pakistan Tamgha (Resolution Day Golden Jubilee Medal) 1990	Tamgha-e-Salgirah Pakistan (Independence Day Golden Jubilee Medal) 1997	The Order of Military Merit (Grand Cordon) (Jordan)

=== Foreign Decorations ===
Foreign Awards
Jordan	The Order of Military Merit (Grand Cordon)

== See also ==
- History of the Pakistan Air Force

Military offices
Preceded by Farooq Feroze Khan	Chief of Air Staff; 1994 – 1997	Succeeded by Parvaiz Mehdi Qureshi
