= Jamal A. Khan =

Former Pakistan Air Force Chief

Jamal Ahmad Khan SJ NI(M) HI(M) SI(M) SBt
- جمال احمد خان

4th Chief of Air Staff
- In office 6 March 1985 – 9 March 1988
- Preceded by: Anwar Shamim
- Succeeded by: Hakeemullah Khan Durrani

President of Pakistan Squash Federation
- In office 1987–1988

Personal details
- Born: Jamal Ahmad Khan Afridi; 15 April 1934 (age 92) Farrukhabad, United Province, British India
- Nickname: Jamal

Military service
- Allegiance: Pakistan
- Branch/service: Pakistan Air Force
- Years of service: 1952–1988
- Rank: Air Chief Marshal; Pak/5057
- Unit: No. 11 Squadron Arrows
- Commands: Vice Chief of the Air Staff; DCAS (Air Operations); Pakistan Armed Forces–Middle East Command; UAE Air Force; JAG Corps, Air Force; ACAS (Plans)
- Battles/wars: Indo-Pakistani War of 1965; Indo-Pakistani War of 1971
- Awards: See list

Jamal Ahmad Khan Afridi (Note: Urdu: جمال احمد خان) (born 15 April 1934) is a retired four-star air officer who served as the fourth Chief of Air Staff of the Pakistan Air Force from 1985 until 1988. He also commanded the United Arab Emirates Air Force from 1977 until 1980.

== Biography ==
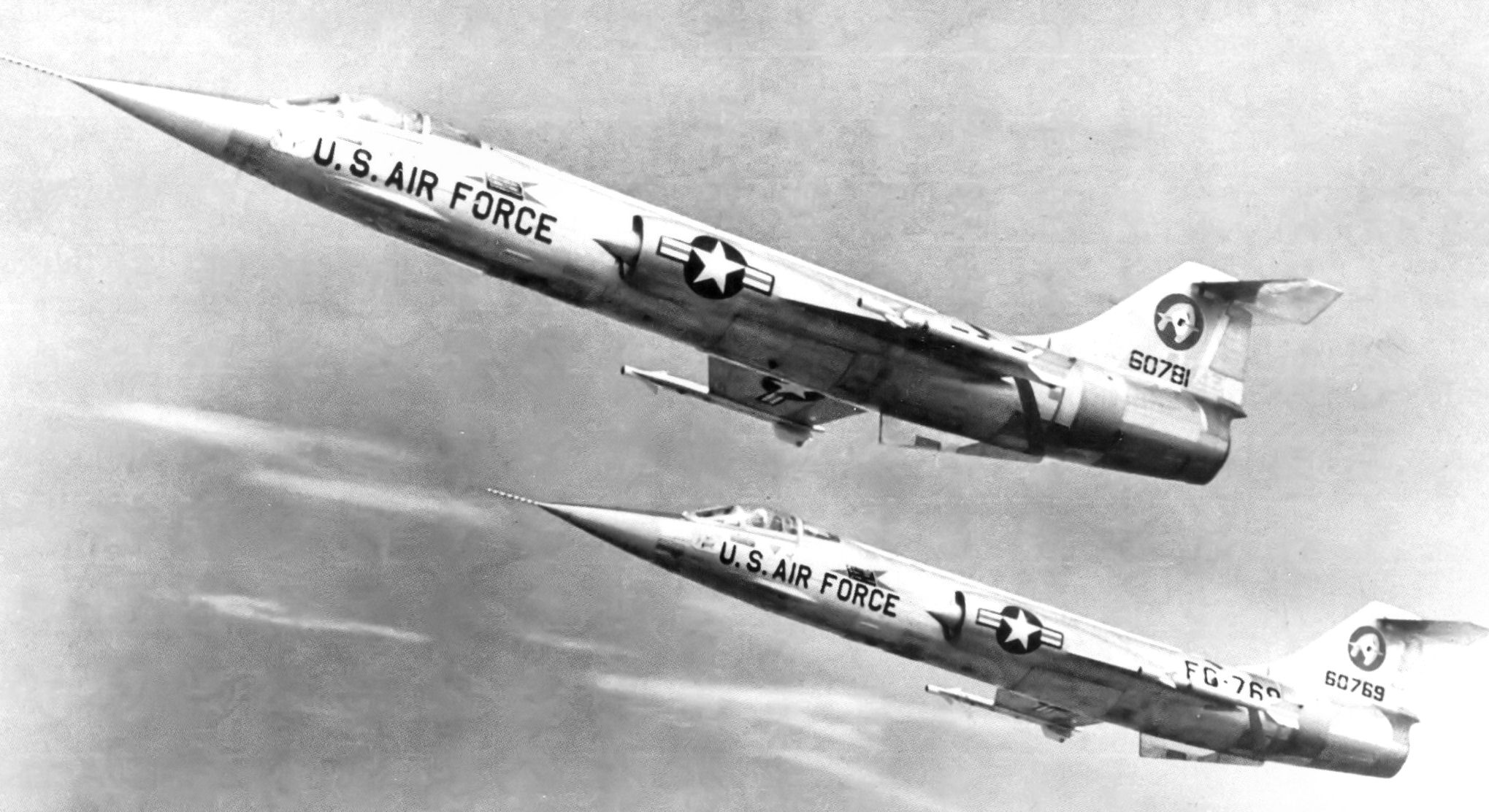
F-104 in flight. Wing Commander Jamal Khan shot down Indian Canberra in 1965 and 1971.

Jamal Ahmad Khan was born in Kaimganj, Farrukhabad district in India, on 15 April 1934.

In 1952, after the partition of India, he joined the Pakistan Air Force (PAF). He was sent to attend the Pakistan Air Force Academy in Risalpur, and was one of the few cadets who were selected to attend the United States Air Force Academy in Colorado, United States. Upon completing the pilot training program from the USAF Academy in 1953, Jamal was commissioned in the No. 11 Squadron Arrows, initially trained to fly the British Supermarine Attacker. He was further trained in the United States as a test pilot, eventually qualified to fly the Lockheed F-104 Starfighter.

In 1965, Squadron-Leader Jamal flew his F-104 to intercept an Indian Air Force English Electric Canberra at 33,000 feet (10,000 m) above, shooting down the Canberra with a Sidewinder missile near the Fazilka district, inside Pakistani territory. This was recorded as the first kill achieved by an F-104 at night after a number of near misses.

In 1971, Wing-Commander Jamal continued flying his F-104 on the western front of the third war with India. Wg-Cdr. Jamal shot down another Canberra with an AIM-9B missile; the Canberra pilot perished.

After the war, Group Captain Jamal was posted to a Command Operations Center at the Air Headquarters (AHQ) in Islamabad until appointed as base commander of the Sargodha Air Force Base. In 1975, Air Commodore Jamal joined the JAG Corps, Air Force, appointed its chief inspector and later judge advocate general. For some time, Air Cdre. Jamal served as the ACAS (Plans) at the AHQ before being promoted to the two-star rank, Air vice-marshal (AVM).

In 1977, AVM Jamal was posted as an AOC at the Pakistan Armed Forces–Middle East Command, and seconded to command the United Arab Emirates Air Force until 1980. During this time, AVM Jamal took over the command of the Pakistan Armed Forces–Middle East Command, serving as its commander until 1980. Upon returning, AVM Jamal flew the MiG-19 and MiG-21 for test trial purposes. During this time, he went to the United States to complete his training to fly the F-16A. He was the first Pakistani to fly the F-16A in the United States, and later returned to Pakistan.

In 1982–83, Air-Marshal Jamal was appointed as DCAS (Air Operations), and later appointed as Vice Chief of the Air Staff in 1984.

In 1985, Air-Mshl. Jamal was promoted to four-star rank, Air Chief Marshal (ACM), and took over command of the Pakistan Air Force as its Chief of Air Staff. In 1987, ACM Jamal launched the project to develop and design a fighter jet, with Grumman Aerospace as its consultant. After completing his tenure, ACM Jamal was succeeded by ACM H.K. Durrani on 6 March 1988. After his retirement, he settled in Islamabad, and worked as an aviation historian, contributing to the book on aerial aviation, The Story of the Pakistan Air Force, 1988-1998: A Battle Against Odds.

== Awards & Decorations ==
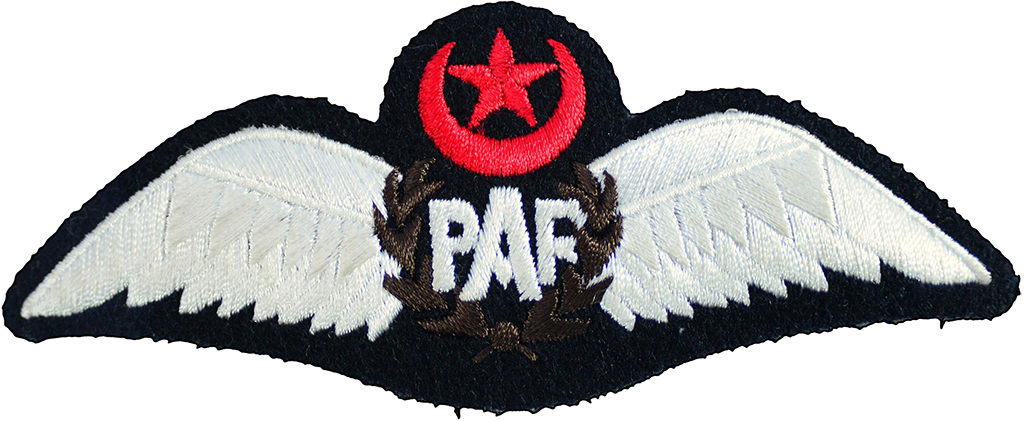

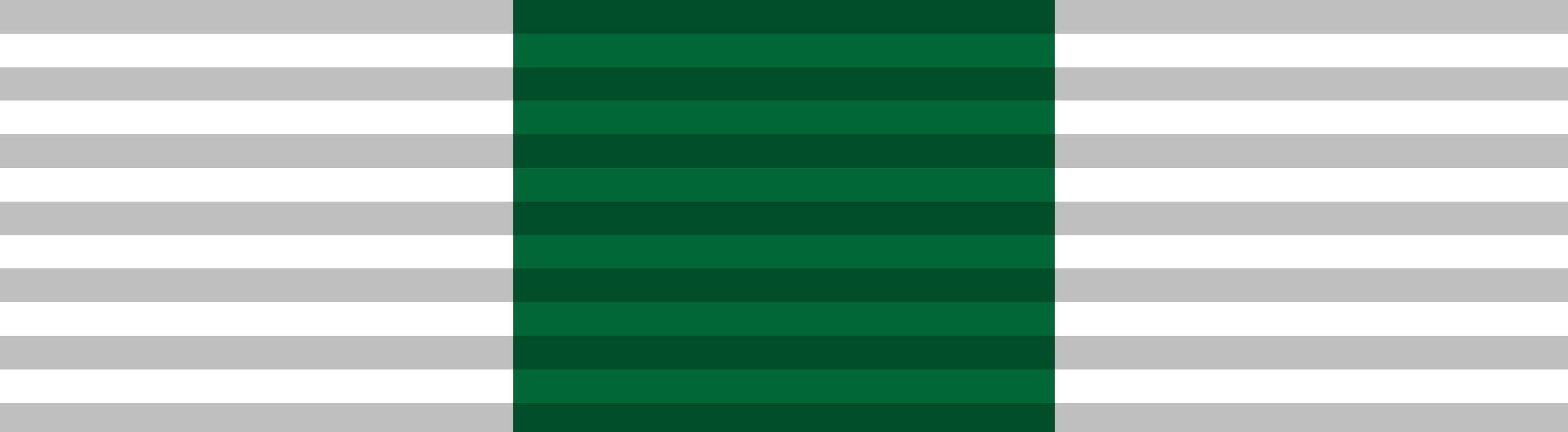

PAF GD(P) Badge RED (More than 3000 Flying Hours)
| | Nishan-e-Imtiaz (Military) (Order of Excellence) | | |
| Hilal-e-Imtiaz (Military) (Crescent of Excellence) | Sitara-e-Jurat (Star of Courage) 1965 War | Sitara-e-Imtiaz (Military) (Star of Excellence) | Sitara-e-Basalat (Star of Valour) |
| Tamgha-e-Diffa (Defence Medal): 1. 1965 War Clasp; 2. 1971 War Clasp | Sitara-e-Harb 1965 War (War Star 1965) | Sitara-e-Harb 1971 War (War Star 1971) | Tamgha-e-Jang 1965 War (War Medal 1965) |
| Tamgha-e-Jang 1971 War (War Medal 1971) | Tamgha-e-Sad Saala Jashan-e-Wiladat-e-Quaid-e-Azam (100th Birth Anniversary of Muhammad Ali Jinnah) 1976 | Tamgha-e-Qayam-e-Jamhuria (Republic Commemoration Medal) 1956 | Hijri Tamgha (Hijri Medal) 1979 |

== See also ==
- F-104 in the service of Pakistan Air Force

== Notes ==
Military offices
| Preceded by Anwar Shamim | Chief of Air Staff; 1985–1988 | Succeeded by Hakimullah |
