= Zaffar Aslam =

Pakistan's Air Marshal

Air Marshal Zaffar Aslam HI(M) SI(M) SBt TI(M)
- Education: Pakistan Air Force Academy
- Military career
- Allegiance: Pakistan
- Branch: Pakistan Air Force
- Rank: Air Marshal
- Commands: Air Officer Commanding Central Air Command; Deputy Chief of the Air Staff (NASTP)
- Awards: Hilal-e-Imtiaz (Military); Sitara-e-Imtiaz (Military); Sitara-e-Basalat; Tamgha-e-Imtiaz (Military)

Air Marshal Zaffar Aslam HI(M), SI(M), SBt, TI(M) is a senior officer in the Pakistan Air Force (PAF), currently serving as the Vice Chief of the Air Staff.

== Military career ==
Zafar Aslam was commissioned into the General Duties (Pilot) Branch of the Pakistan Air Force. In 2020, he was promoted to the rank of Air Vice Marshal.

Over the years, he has held various operational and administrative roles. Notably, he served as the Air Officer Commanding of the Central Air Command.

Subsequently, he was elevated to the rank of Air Marshal and appointed as the Deputy Chief of the Air Staff for NASTP. He is also a member of the Board of Governors of Air University.

== Awards and decorations ==
Aslam has been awarded with several military honours, which includes Hilal-e-Imtiaz (Military), Sitara-e-Imtiaz, Sitara-e-Basalat, Tamgha-e-Imtiaz.
