= Hamid Rashid Randhawa =

Senior officer in the Pakistan Air Force

Air Marshal Hamid Rashid Randhawa HI(M) SI(M) TI(M)
- Education: Pakistan Air Force Academy
- Military career
- Allegiance: Pakistan
- Branch: Pakistan Air Force
- Service years: 1988 — 2025
- Rank: Air Marshal
- Commands: Air Officer Commanding PAF Academy Asghar Khan; Vice Chief of Air Staff; Deputy Chief of the Air Staff (Operations)
- Awards: Hilal-e-Imtiaz (Military) Sitara-e-Imtiaz (Military) Tamgha-e-Imtiaz (Military)

Hamid Rashid Randhawa is a senior officer in the Pakistan Air Force who served as Vice Chief of Air Staff.

== Military career ==
Hamid Rashid Randhawa was commissioned into the General Duties (Pilot) Branch of the Pakistan Air Force in 1988.

In July 2020, Randhawa was promoted from Air Commodore to the rank of Air Vice Marshal. As an air vice marshal, he served as Assistant Chief of Air Staff (Safety), Air Officer Commanding of PAF Academy Asghar Khan and Additional Secretary at Ministry of Defence. He also served as Personal Staff Officer to Chief of Air Staff.

In 2021, he was promoted from Air vice-marshal to the rank of Air marshal. At that time, he was serving as Inspector General of PAF at Air Headquarters.

He was appointed as Vice Chief of Air Staff, a key appointment of PAF. He also served as Deputy Chief of the Air Staff (Operations) at Air Headquarters Islamabad.
