= Zahid Mahmood (air marshal) =

Vice chief of air staff in the Pakistan Air Force

Air Marshal Zahid Mahmood HI(M) SI(M) TI(M)
- Education: National Defence University
- Military career
- Allegiance: Pakistan
- Branch: Pakistan Air Force
- Service years: 1987–2024
- Rank: Air marshal
- Commands: Vice Chief of Air Staff; Combat Commanders' School
- Awards: Hilal-i-Imtiaz; Tamgha-e-Imtiaz; Sitara-i-Imtiaz
- Preceded by: Air Marshal Syed Noman Ali

Vice Chief of Air Staff
- In office March 2022 – 2024

Muhammad Zahid Mahmood HI TI SI is a retired air marshal and flight instructor in the Pakistan Air Force who served as the 6th vice chief of air staff. Prior to assuming the office in March 2022, he commanded the Combat Commanders' School at PAF Base Mushaf.

== Career ==
Mahmood was commissioned in GD Pilot branch of the Pakistan Air Force in April 1987. His staff appointments include deputy chief of air staff (Personal) at the Air Headquarters, director general of the Command, Control, Communications, Computers, and Intelligence (C4I) and assistant chief of the air staff (Plans).

He graduated from the Combat Commanders’ School, National Defence University, and the Air Command and Staff College, United States.
