= Randhawa =

Jat clan in Punjab of India and Pakistan

- Jat clan
- Location: Punjab
- Language: Punjabi
- Religion: Sikhism, Islam, Hinduism

Randhawa is a Jat clan found in the Punjab region of India and Pakistan. The Randhawa name has special significance in the history of the Sikh faith, the first appointed Granthi (Principal religious official and custodian of the holy book- Guru Granth Sahib) was a Randhawa (Baba Buddha) There are also adherents of Hinduism and Islam belonging to the Randhawa clan.

== List of notable people ==
Notable people who bear the name and may or may not be associated with the clan are:

- Amanpreet Singh Randhawa (better known as Mahabali Shera), Indian wrestler
- Arfa Abdul Karim Randhawa (1995–2012), Pakistani child prodigy, youngest Microsoft Certified Professional
- Afzal Ahsan Randhawa, Pakistani writer, and member of the National Assembly of Pakistan
- Baba Buddha, prime historical figure in Sikhism
- Dara Singh Randhawa, Indian wrestler and actor
- Gurbachan Singh Randhawa, Indian athlete
- Guriq Randhawa, English cricketer
- Gurman Randhawa, English cricketer
- Guru Randhawa, Indian singer and songwriter from Gurdaspur, Punjab, India
- Hamid Rashid Randhawa, former Vice Chief of Air Staff of Pakistan Air Force
- Iftikhar Randhawa, Pakistani politician and writer
- Jesse Randhawa, Indian actress and model
- Jyoti Randhawa, Indian golfer
- Karishma Randhawa, Indian actress
- Kuljeet Randhawa, Indian actress and model
- Kuljit Singh Randhawa, Indian politician
- Kulraj Randhawa, Indian actress
- Mohinder Singh Randhawa, Indian administrator, historian and botanist
- Muhammad Tahir Randhawa, Pakistani politician
- Nikki Randhawa Haley, née Randhawa, former Governor of South Carolina, former United States Ambassador to the United Nations, former candidate for POTUS.
- Ravinder Randhawa, British writer
- Saadhika Randhawa, Indian actor
- Sabah Randhawa, American academic administrator
- Sardara Singh Randhawa, Indian wrestler and actor
- Shaad Randhawa, Indian actor
- Sukhjinder Singh Randhawa, Indian politician
- Surjit Singh Randhawa, Indian field hockey player
