= Eric G. Hall =

Pakistani fighter pilot (1922–1998)

Air Vice Marshal Eric G. Hall SPk SJ
- အဲရစ်ဂေါ်ဒွန်ခန်းမ
- Hall as a Wing Commander, c. 1952

Director General Civil Aviation Authority of Pakistan
- In office March 1976 – 6 March 1978
- Appointed by: Prime Minister Zulfikar Ali Bhutto
- President: Fazal Ilahi Chaudhry
- Deputy: M.Y. Wazirzada

9th Commandant PAF Staff College
- In office October 1974 – 30 June 1975

Air attaché to Embassy of Pakistan, Washington, D.C.
- In office June 1972 – October 1974
- Preceded by: Saeedullah Khan
- Succeeded by: Sajad Haider

8th Chief of Staff Pakistan Air Force
- In office 1 April 1970 – 3 June 1972
- Commander-in-Chief: Abdur Rahim Khan (1969-1972); Zafar Chaudhry (1972-1974)
- Preceded by: S. A. Yusaf
- Succeeded by: Saeedullah Khan (as Deputy Chief of Air Staff)

Personal details
- Born: Eric Gordon Hall; 12 October 1922 Rangoon, British rule in Burma
- Died: June 17, 1998 (aged 75) Rockville, Maryland, U.S.
- Resting place: Gate of Heaven Cemetery (Silver Spring, Maryland)
- Children: 2
- Education: No. 1 (I) SFTS; RAF Central Flying School; RAF Staff College, Andover
- Awards: See list
- Nickname: The Heavy Hitter

Military service
- Branch/service: Royal Indian Air Force (1943-1947); Pakistan Air Force (1947-1975)
- Years of service: 1943–1975
- Rank: Air Vice Marshal
- Unit: No. 6 Squadron PAF
- Commands: PAF Staff College; PAF Station Masroor; PAF Station Chaklala; PAF Station Drigh Road; No. 6 Squadron PAF
- Battles/wars: World War II; Burma campaign; Indo-Pakistani War of 1965; Indo-Pakistani Air War of 1965; Indo-Pakistani War of 1971

Eric Gordon Hall (Note: Burmese: အဲရစ်ဂေါ်ဒွန်ခန်းမ) (12 October 1922 — 17 June 1998) also known as Eric G. Hall and E.G. Hall, was a transport pilot, fighter pilot, aerobatic pilot, and a two-star rank officer in the Pakistan Air Force. He served as its eighth and last Chief of Staff from 1970 to 1972, and retired in 1975 as Commandant of the PAF Staff College. Subsequently, Prime Minister Zulfikar Ali Bhutto appointed him as the Director General of Civil Aviation, where he served from 1976 to 1978. He was also a businessman.

Born in Rangoon, Hall and his younger brother undertook the journey to British India on foot following the Japanese invasion of Burma, after the women in their family were airlifted. They walked for weeks through the jungles of Myitkyina to finally arrive in Dibrugarh. On his arrival, Hall was hospitalised for the injuries he had sustained from the journey. Afterwards, he joined the Royal Indian Air Force in 1943.

Deployed to Burma in a fighter-recon squadron, he participated in aerial operations against Japanese forces in World War II. After the Partition of British India, he opted to join the Royal Pakistan Air Force in 1947. Among its pioneer officers, he joined the team which assisted Wing Commander Asghar Khan to establish the RPAF Flying Training School. By 1958, he served as an instructor on the directing staff of the PAF Staff College, which he also helped establish and was appointed as the Assistant Commandant of the college on his promotion to Group Captain in 1960.

At the onset of the Indo-Pakistani War of 1965, Hall was the Commander of PAF Station Chaklala and pioneered the idea of converting C-130 Hercules transport aircraft into heavy bombers, enhancing their capacity to carry 13,000 kg (28,000 lb) of explosives with modifications. Although the C-130 was unarmoured and lacked the ability to tolerate any Ack-ack, Hall volunteered to lead the first bombing mission on the heavily guarded Kathua bridge, on 11 September. This strike significantly hampered the Indian advance into the Chumb sector. The success of the mission prompted the Pakistan military leadership to approve 13 further bombing runs using the modified C-130s including precision-weapons strikes on Indian weaponry along the BRB Canal. For his leadership, Hall was awarded the Sitara-e-Jurat and nicknamed "The Heavy Hitter".

== Early life ==
Born on 12 October 1922 into a Christian Anglo-Burmese family during the British rule in Burma, Eric matriculated from the Diocesan Boys High School in Rangoon. His father, Captain E. E. Hall was a combat engineer in the British Army and after the Japanese invasion of Burma was assigned to destroy facilities and equipment before it could be seized by the advancing Japanese. He went missing in action and was declared dead shortly after.

Due to the war, the women of Eric's family, namely his mother, sister and aunt were airlifted to British India, while he and his younger brother left on foot. Exhausted and ill with blistered bug bitten feet, he wore out his shoes after traveling through the jungle on foot for weeks from Myitkyina to Dibrugarh, where he then remained hospitalised for a short time.

== Personal life ==
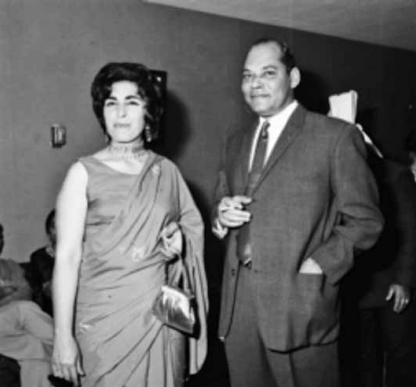
Eric with his wife in the Mess Hall of PAF Base Peshawar at a gathering, c. 1970-72

He married Marjorie May Wells, also an Anglo-Burmese Christian, and they had two children: a daughter Gillian Hall born on 1 December 1949 and son Clive Hall born on 5 May 1953.

In 1966, Marjorie served as Chairwoman of the Chaklala division of the PAF Women's Association.

== Service years ==
=== Royal Indian Air Force (1943-1947) ===
Upon his release from the hospital, he enlisted in the Royal Indian Air Force as part of the 20 Pilot course of the Initial Training Wing (Lahore) on 18 March 1943 and completed ground training by 31 August 1943.

The course trained at No. 2 Elementary Flying Training School in Jodhpur from 19 September to 11 December 1943. They were commissioned into the Royal Indian Air Force on 20 December 1943, upon reporting to No. 1 (Indian) Service Flying Training School RAF for advanced training which concluded on 21 April 1944. They then attended the 31st Fighter Course at No. 151 OTU from 15 May to 5 August 1944, followed by a Low Attack Course at Ranchi from 27 August to 21 September 1944.

During World War II, Hall was deployed to Burma in a fighter-reconnaissance squadron, where he participated in aerial operations against Japanese forces as a Hawker Hurricane fighter pilot.

Flying Officer Hall and Cadet Harrison survived an aviation accident on 12 April 1947. They had taken off in a Tiger Moth II and crash landed 6 miles South East of Jodhpur after an engine failure.

=== Pakistan Air Force (1947-1975) ===
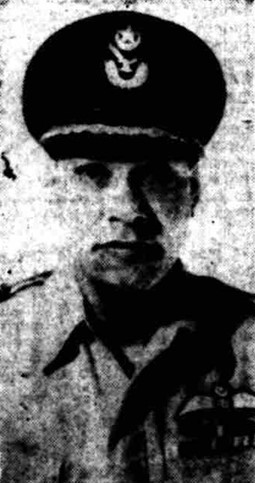
Wg Cdr Hall, c. 1960

After the Partition of British India in August 1947, he opted for Pakistan, moved his family to Lahore, and transferred his service to the Royal Pakistan Air Force.

On the occasion of Pakistan Day in 1948, Flying Officer Hall was the second to take flight, following Khyber Khan, in the country's first air display which was witnessed by 150,000 people. He captivated the crowd in a Tiger Moth, performing a stunning display of stunt flying and aerobatics at 3,000 ft.

From April 1950 to November 1952, he was employed on staff duties at the Air Headquarters. Promoted to Wing Commander, he commanded No. 6 Sqn for 3 ½ years. He was selected to attend the RAF Staff College, Andover in May 1956 and on his return, he commanded the Officers' Advanced Administration School. In June 1957, Wg Cdr Hall was appointed as the first Commandant of the Junior Command and Staff School and also the fourth Commandant of the College of Education.

In October 1958, he was posted to PAF Staff College as an instructor on the directing staff. On 8 March 1960, he was promoted to Group Captain and appointed Assistant Commandant of the College, serving until December 1961.

==== Indo-Pakistani War of 1965 ====
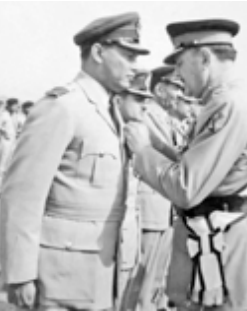
President Ayub Khan pins the Sitara-e-Jurat on Gp Cpt Hall (1965)

When the war began, Group Captain Eric G. Hall was serving as Commander Station Chaklala. He pioneered the innovative concept of converting C-130 Hercules transport aircraft into heavy bombers, enhancing their capacity to carry 13,000 kg (28,000 lb) of explosives with specific modifications. On 11 September, Hall volunteered to lead the initial bombing mission over a strategically vital bridge in Kathua which was used to deliver supplies to the Indian Army. Despite the transport-turned-bomber being unarmoured and vulnerable to Indian anti-aircraft guns, the mission was successful. As a result, the Pakistani military leadership authorized 13 additional strategic bombing runs using the converted C-130s, including precision strikes on Indian weaponry at Attari along the BRB Canal. The effectiveness of these missions solidified his innovative concept, earning him the Sitara-e-Jurat, the third highest military award in Pakistan.

===== Sitara-e-Jurat =====
His Sitara-e-Jurat citation reads:

CITATION
GROUP CAPTAIN ERIC GORDON HALL (PAK/2768)

"Gp Capt Eric Gordon Hall in his capacity as Station Commander, Chaklala played a very vital role during the war with India. All operations were conducted very successfully under exemplary guidance and inspiring leadership of Gp Capt Eric Gordon Hall. No task was too hazardous for him. To set an example, he personally flew and led several operational missions that kept the morale of his officers and men at an exceptionally high level. For his courage and example beyond the call of duty, Gp Capt Eric Gordon Hall is awarded SJ."

=== Post-war career ===
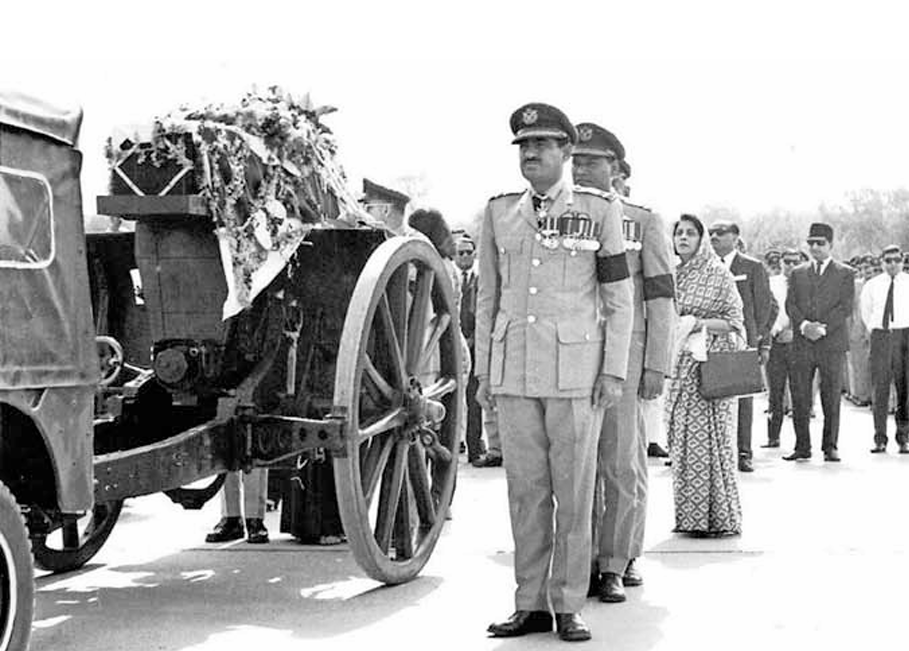
Air Commodores Abdur Rahim Khan, Eric G. Hall, and other PAF officers escort the coffin of their colleague FS Hussain, 1969

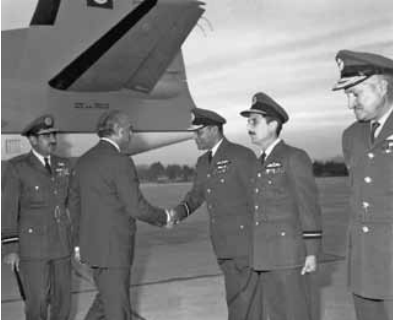
Air Marshal Abdur Rahim Khan and Prime Minister Zulfikar Ali Bhutto arrive together at PAF Base Peshawar. Bhutto (left) shakes hands with Air Vice Marshal Hall, 1972

In June 1966, Hall was appointed as Assistant Chief of Air Staff (Training) and remained in the role until October 1968, when he took command of PAF Station Masroor. In November 1969, he was appointed as Assistant Chief of Air Staff (Administration) where he served until 31 March 1970.

Air Vice Marshal Eric G. Hall was appointed Chief of Staff of the Pakistan Air Force on 1 April 1970 and played a key role in ensuring war plans were executed effectively during the Indo-Pakistani War of 1971. He served until 3 June 1972 and was the last Chief of Staff when the position was abolished and replaced with its equivalent, the Deputy Chief of Air Staff.

That month, Hall succeeded Air Vice Marshal Saeedullah Khan as the Air attaché to the Embassy of Pakistan, Washington, D.C. and served until October 1974. He was invited by The Judge Advocate General's Legal Center and School as a distinguished guest to the graduation ceremony of the 21st Advanced Class on 1 June 1973, where he assisted in the ceremony.

On his return to Pakistan in October 1974, he served as the ninth Commandant of the PAF Staff College until his retirement on 30 June 1975.

== Civil Aviation ==
Re-employed as a BPS-21 grade officer of the Government of Pakistan in March 1976, Eric G. Hall was appointed as the Director General of the Civil Aviation Authority of Pakistan by Prime Minister Zulfikar Ali Bhutto.

A declassified State Department cable from May 1976, sent from the Consulate General of the United States, Karachi to the United States Secretary of State, described Hall as, "well and favorably known to USAF officers serving in Pakistan who describe him as honest, straightforward, and generally pro-American. His reputation as an administrator is good."

On 11 May 1976 in Karachi, Hall met with Dr. Emil Hinek, an official from the aviation department of the Hungarian Ministry of Transport and Postal Affairs. They signed an agreement to start regular flights between Budapest and Karachi. Hall relinquished charge on the afternoon of 6 March 1978.

== Business career ==
Sometime after, Hall ran an export-import company in Karachi for a year. By 1980, he moved to the United States with his family and settled in the Washington, D.C. area, later becoming a resident of Gaithersburg, Maryland. From August 1982 to 1995, he was the President of Hall Enterprises, a business he started with his wife, which imported-exported Pakistani furniture, giftware, and military spare parts. In addition to that, he had a shop which specialized in ceramics, jewelry and gifts in Ellicott City, Maryland.

== Death ==
Hospitalized after a stroke, Hall died on 17 June 1998 at Adventist HealthCare Shady Grove Medical Center. He was buried at the Gate of Heaven Cemetery (Silver Spring, Maryland) and survived by his widow, children, and sister Cindy Hollyer.
