= Mohammad Akhtar (pilot) =

Pakistani pilot and airline executive (1921-1983)

Mohammad Akhtar SQA SK
- محمد اختر
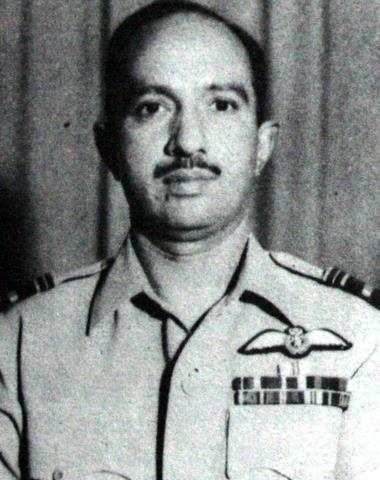
- Portrait, c. 1965

5th Commandant PAF Staff College
- In office 13 September 1968 – June 1969
- Preceded by: Abdur Rahim Khan

President of Pakistan International Airlines and Chief Administrator Civil Aviation & Tourism
- In office 7 May 1968 (Note: Akhtar's predecessor, Asghar Khan, went on leave on 7 May. Akhtar documentarily took over on 23 July 1968.) – 12 September 1968
- Preceded by: Asghar Khan
- Succeeded by: Shakirullah Durrani

1st Deputy Chief of Air Staff Pakistan Air Force
- In office 26 November 1964 – 8 April 1966
- Preceded by: M. A. Rahman (as Chief of Staff)
- Succeeded by: S. A. Yusuf
- Commander-in-Chief: Air Marshal Asghar Khan (1957-1965); Air Marshal Nur Khan (1965-1969)

Commanding Officer No. 9 Squadron RIAF
- In office 1 November 1946 – 14 August 1947
- Preceded by: Asghar Khan

Personal details
- Born: 10 July 1921 Sialkot, British India
- Died: 26 May 1983 (aged 61) CMH Rawalpindi, Pakistan
- Education: Government College, Lahore; RAF Staff College, Andover

Military service
- Branch/service: Royal Indian Air Force (1941-1947); Pakistan Air Force (1947-1969)
- Years of service: 1941-1969
- Rank: Air Vice Marshal
- Commands: PAF Staff College; No. 9 Squadron RIAF
- Battles/wars: World War II; Burma campaign; Indo-Pakistani War of 1947; Indo-Pakistani War of 1965; Indo-Pakistani air war of 1965
- Awards: Sitara-e-Khidmat (1964); Sitara-e-Quaid-e-Azam (1967)

Mohammad Akhtar (Note: Urdu: محمد اختر) (10 July 1921 — 26 May 1983) also known as M Akhtar, was a Pakistani former two-star rank air officer and airline executive, who served as the first Deputy Chief of Air Staff of the Pakistan Air Force from November 1964 to April 1966. He also briefly served as the President of the Pakistan International Airlines from May 1968 to September 1968.

== Early life ==
Mohammad Akhtar was born on 10 July 1921. He graduated from the Government College, Lahore.

== Service years ==
=== Royal Indian Air Force (1941-1947) ===
He was commissioned into the Royal Indian Air Force on 6 January 1941. During the war, he served in Burma with No. 9 Sqn. He commanded the Squadron from 1 November 1946 to 14 August 1947.

=== Pakistan Air Force (1947-1969) ===
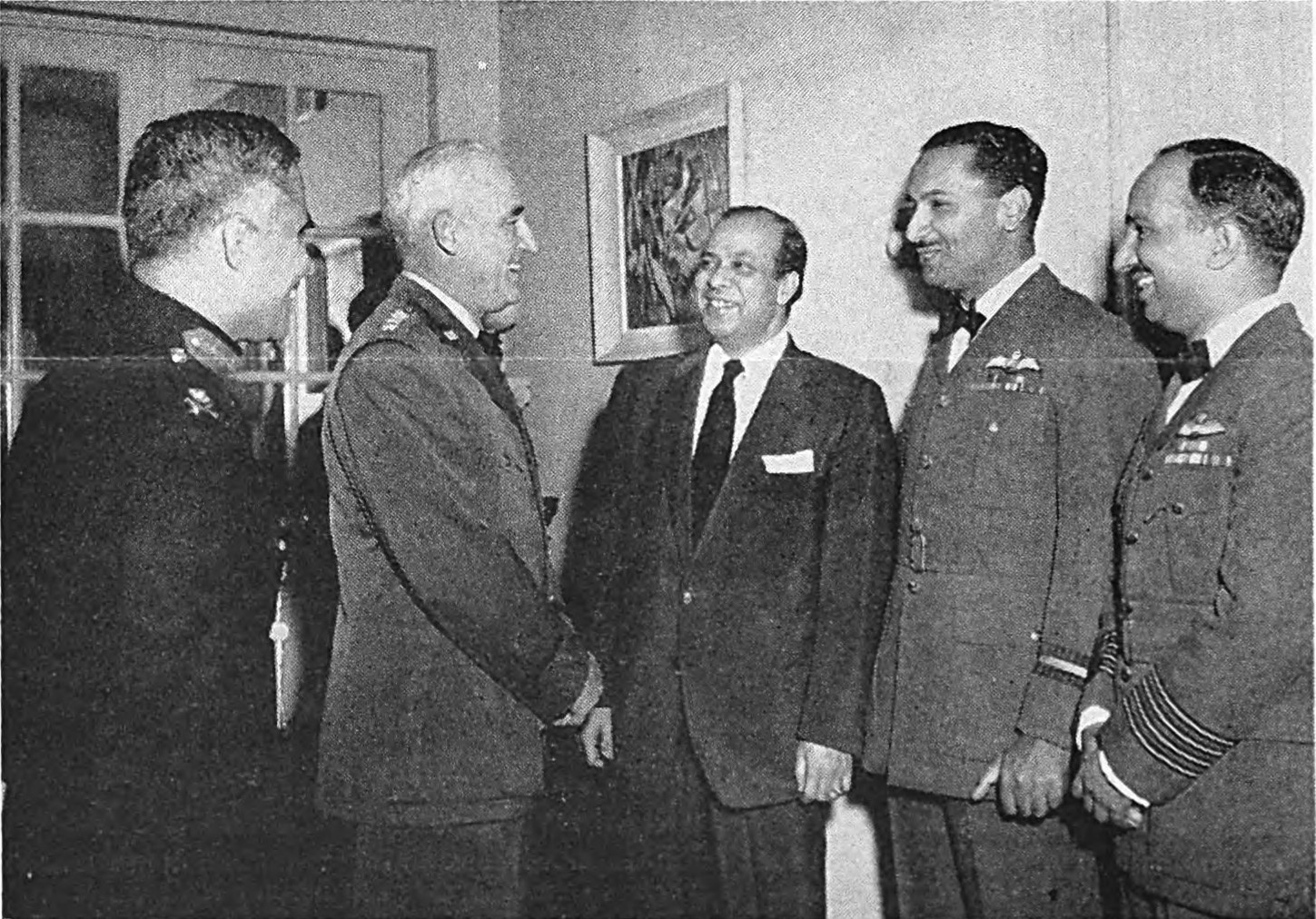
From left: Maj Gen Mian Hayaud Din, General Twining, Ambassador Bogra, Air Cdre Asghar Khan, and Gp Capt Akhtar. Pictured at a reception held in Khan's honor in Washington, D.C., after the announcement of his appointment as Chief of the Air Force. Circa 21 April – May 1957

After the Partition of British India in August 1947, Akhtar transferred his service to the Royal Pakistan Air Force (RPAF). In September 1948, he was promoted to Wing Commander and appointed Commander of RPAF Station Peshawar.

In August 1951, Group Captain Akhtar was appointed as the first Assistant Chief of Air Staff (Admin). In the mid-1950s, he served as the Air Adviser to High Commissioner for Pakistan to the United Kingdom. He was appointed as Assistant Chief of Air Staff (Maintenance) in November 1956.

In 1958, Flight reported that Akhtar was the Air Officer Commanding of No. 2 Group PAF, which was stationed at Station Drigh Road and responsible for maintenance and supply. He briefly served as the acting Commander-in-Chief from 3 January to 21 January 1961, while Air Marshal Asghar Khan was on an overseas visit.

Air Commodore Akhtar was appointed Assistant Chief of Air Staff (Operations) in June 1963. He was awarded the Sitara-e-Khidmat in 1964. Akhtar succeeded Air Vice Marshal M. A. Rahman, the outgoing Chief of Staff, as the office was renamed to Deputy Chief of Air Staff on 26 November 1964.

During the India–Pakistan war of 1965, Air Commodore Akhtar was the most senior officer in the Command Operations Center and was in charge of Air Operations when the Air Chief was away or resting. He was the first to inform President Ayub Khan of the Indian offensive at around 0430 Hrs and told him that the country was under attack on the Lahore front. Air Commodore Sajad Haider wrote: "Ayub Khan was totally rattled by the news".

On 1 November 1965, the PAF Operational Command was formed with Air Vice Marshal Akhtar appointed as its first Air Officer Commanding.

Following the Tashkent Declaration which was signed by India and Pakistan to resolve the India–Pakistan war of 1965, United States Ambassador to Pakistan Walter P. McConaughy wrote in a confidential telegram sent on 18 January 1966:

In long individual conversations with PAF second in Command Air Vice Marshal Akhtar, and Air Commodores Masrur Hosain and Khyber Khan, gained clear impression that PAF has accepted Tashkent Declaration, but only as relatively unimportant step in continuing struggle for Kashmir. None considered affirmation of adherence to UN Charter as no war pact. All assumed some private Ayub-Shastri understanding which jeopardized or lost altogether with Shastri death. No apparent disaffection with Ayub regime as each subscribed to Ayub's Jan 14 speech. Assume Akhtar reaction most closely (MAAG again isolated, unable provide useful info on Nur or PAF reaction).*

Akhtar basically believes Tashkent exercise unimportant. Expressed opinion that war would be resumed and Pakistan would ultimately win: termed September military results "Inconclusive". (This may have been only for my consumption since later he urged no aid be resumed to India since even food could free other resources for military purposes and US should withhold all to pressure India to come to terms: otherwise, he implied, renewed war inevitable.)

Akhtar does not trust "Hindus" to honor even withdrawal pledge. Stated entire Moslem nation, including Moslem (UPGG PQUTVHN) (AS RECD.) fighting for survival, might as well die on battlefield as submit to Hindus. Said any Govt of Pakistan, including present Govt, must realize this. Cmmt: Akhtar seemed somewhat embarrassed by the last remark as though the reference to a future govt revealed disaffection with Ayub. Tone of rest of conversation, however, indicated he felt Ayub Govt essentially on right track. Can only surmise that apparently inadvertent reference reflects his projected thinking in case Ayub should back away from commitment to Kashmiri Moslems. Akhtar's outlook remains virtually unaffected by results Ayub-Johnson meeting and Tashkent conference; his remarks were almost same during December 5 discussion.

Air Vice Marshal Mohammad Akhtar was appointed General Manager and Senior Vice President of Pakistan International Airlines (PIA) in April 1967. The Government of Pakistan announced Akhtar's appointment as President and Managing Director of the airline in April 1968, as well as Chief Administrator of Civil Aviation and Tourism, when Asghar Khan went on leave on 7 May, in preparation for his retirement following the completion of his three-year term on 23 July 1968.

The Government nationalised PIA with Shakirullah Durrani succeeding Akhtar as the new managing director on 13 September 1968.

Pakistani trade unionist Tufail Abbas wrote in his memoirs:

Air Vice Marshal Akhtar, a close associate of Asghar Khan, replaced him as leader of PIA. Akhtar had his very unique way of working: he wanted to run the airline without the union, and at the same time wanted to get close to workers. Perhaps this was a government trick, a way to break a principled alliance between the administration and the union. While it didn't feel like it in those days, after all these years it certainly looks like a conspiracy. Akhtar lasted only a few months in PIA, however. After removing AVM Akhtar, the Ayub regime launched a new web of conspiracies in PIA, and sent Shakirullah Durrani as Managing Director.

Akhtar returned to the Air Force and was appointed as the Commandant of the PAF Staff College on 13 September 1968. He served until his retirement in June 1969.

== Later life and death ==
Mohammad Akhtar had suffered from a glandular condition for several years and died on 26 May 1983. Retired Air Marshal Asghar Khan, who was under house arrest at the time, noted in his diary that his wife Amina had visited Akhtar a month earlier at CMH Rawalpindi to check on his health. Khan reflected on their long standing friendship, recalling how they had joined the Royal Indian Air Force together and served in various areas over the years and in the same squadron during World War II in Burma. Khan described him as a "very nice man and a good friend" and was saddened by his death. He expressed regret that, due to his house arrest under General Zia-ul-Haq's dictatorship, he was unable to attend the funeral or offer condolences in person.

== Awards and decorations ==
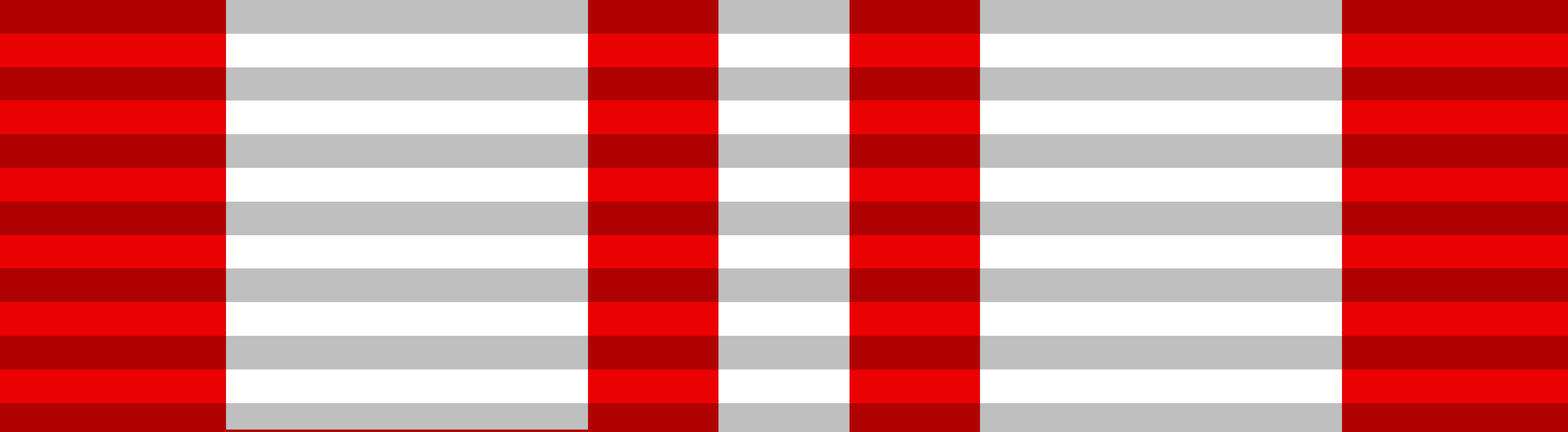
Sitara-e-Khidmat, 1964

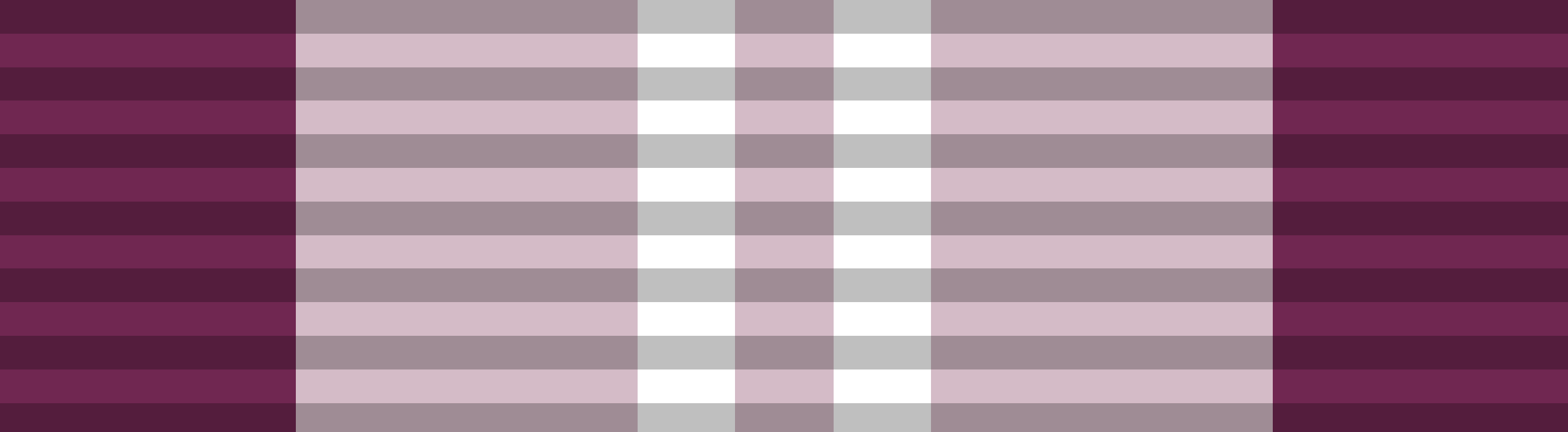
Sitara-e-Quaid-e-Azam, 1967
