= Hifazat Ullah Khan =

Vice Chief of the Air Staff of Pakistan Air Force

Air Marshal Hifazat Ullah Khan حفاظت اللہ خان HI(M) SI(M) TI(M)
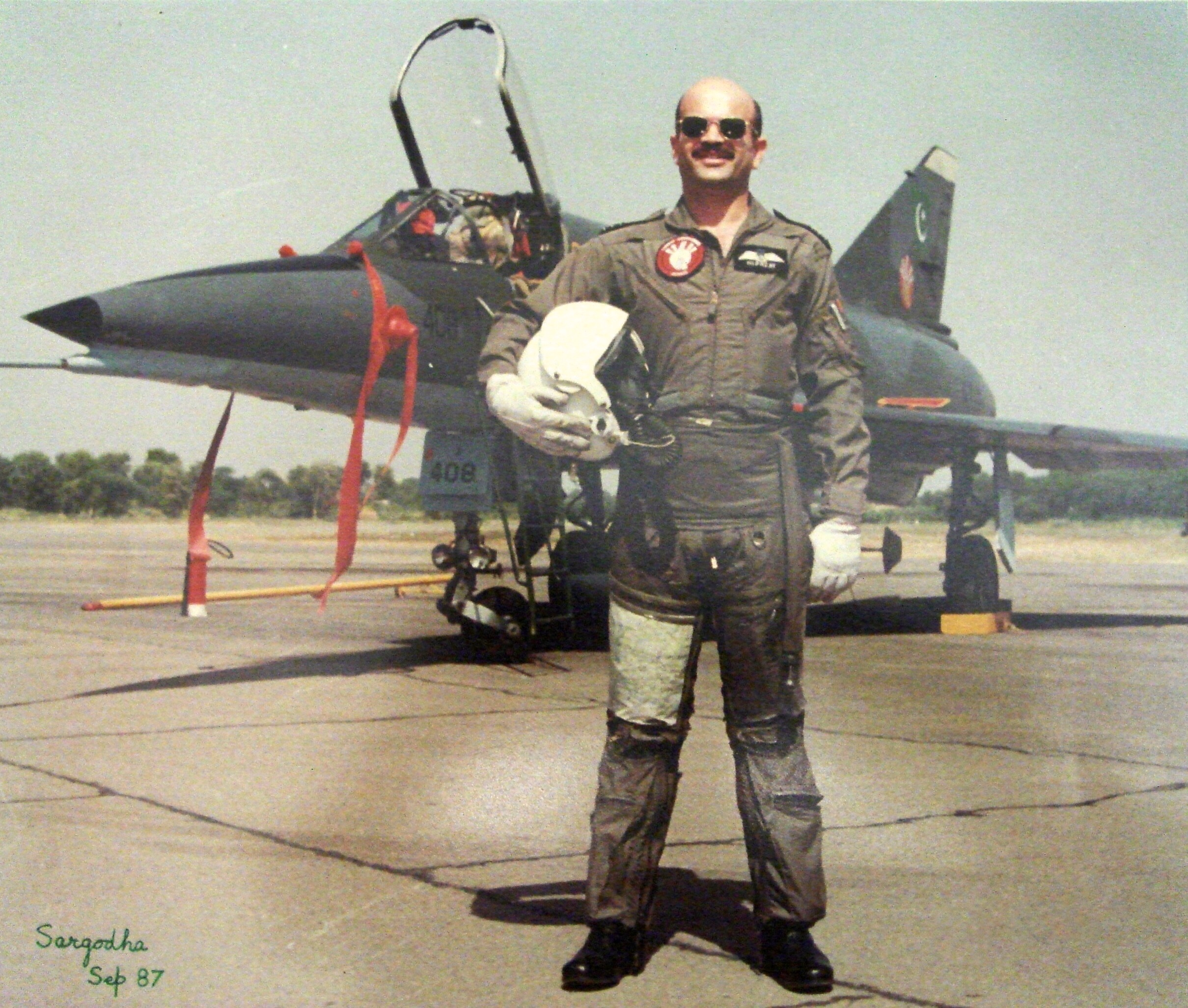
- Air Marshal Hifazat Ullah Khan, Instructor at Combat Commanders School (Pakistan Air Force).
- Military career
- Allegiance: Pakistan
- Branch: Pakistan Air Force
- Service years: 1974–2010
- Rank: Air Marshal
- Unit: No. 5 Squadron Falcons
- Commands: Vice Chief of the Air Staff (VCAS); Deputy Chief of the Air Staff (Personnel); AOC Northern Air Command; Base Commander PAF Base Samungli; OC No. 33 Tactical Attack Wing; No. 5 Squadron Falcons; Air attaché in Saudi Arabia
- Battles: 2001 India-Pakistan standoff 2008 Indo-Pakistan standoff War in North-West Pakistan
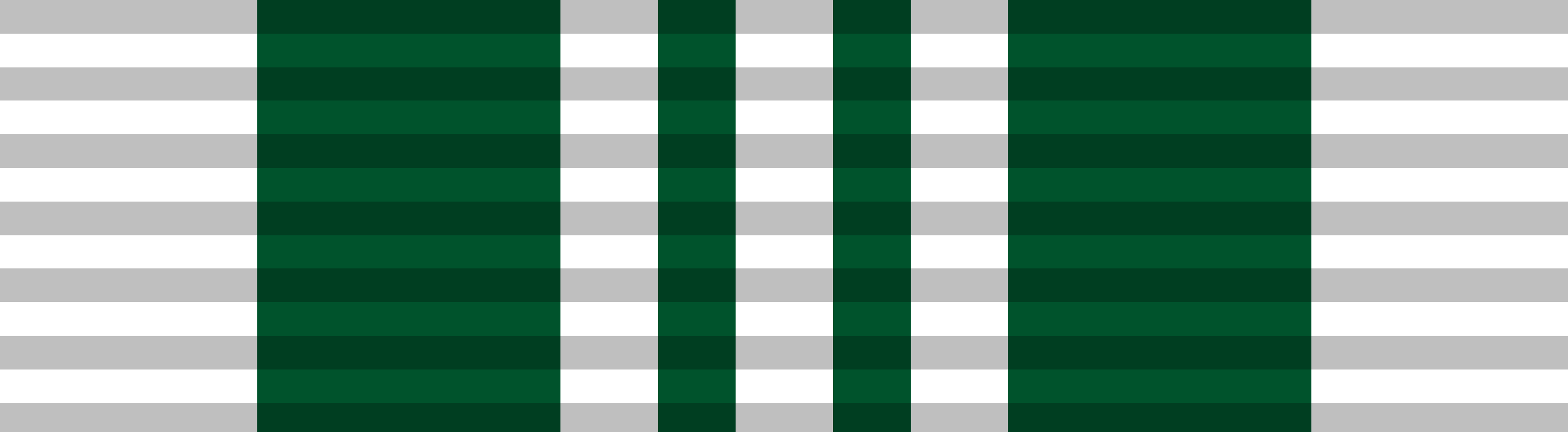
- Awards: Hilal-e-Imtiaz (Military) Sitara-e-Imtiaz (Military) Tamgha-e-Imtiaz (Military)

Hifazat Ullah Khan HI(M) SI(M) TI(M) (Urdu: حفاظت اللہ خان) is a former three-star general air officer who served as Vice Chief of the Air Staff (VCAS) of Pakistan Air Force from 29 March 2009 till 4 October 2010. Hifazat was born in Mianwali. He is a graduate of PAF College Lower Topa where he belonged to V Entry. He then joined the Pakistan Air Force Academy at Risalpur and was commissioned on 25 October 1974 in 58th GD(P) course. He has qualified Staff College and Air War Course from PAF Air War College; L'ESGI and CSI from the École Militaire in France. He holds an M.Sc. in strategic studies, from Karachi University.
