= RAF Staff College, Andover =

Former Air Force staff college in Berkshire, England

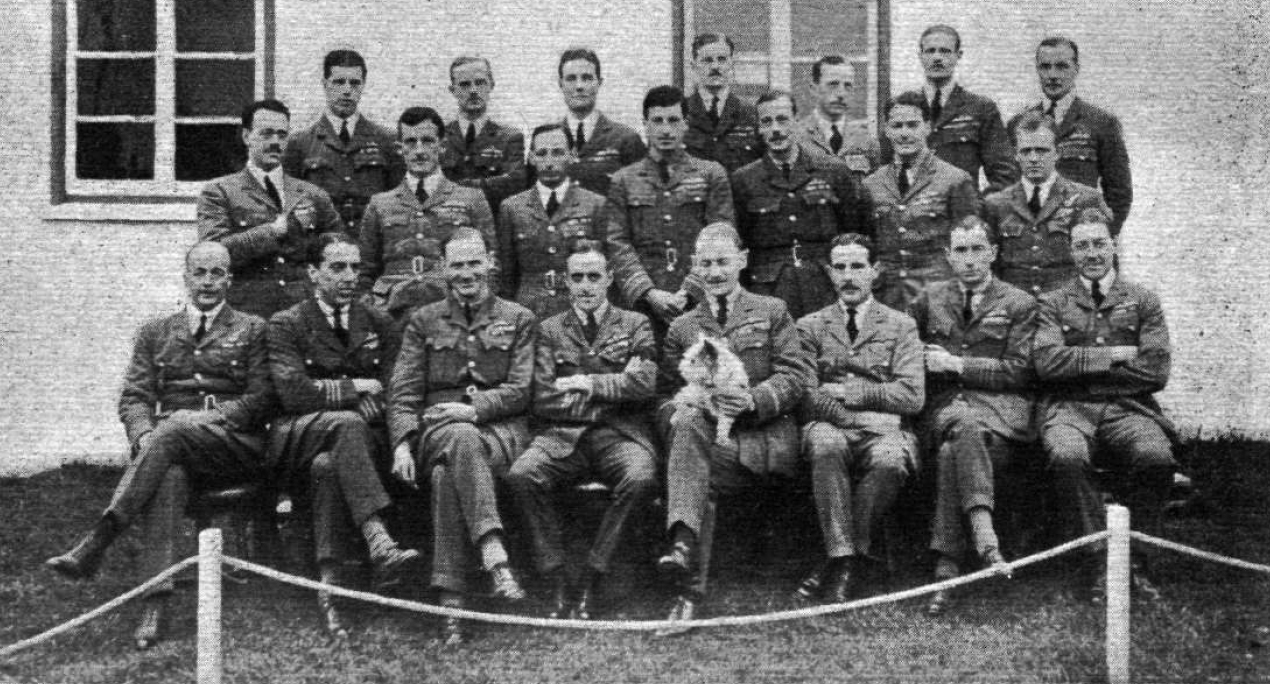
The first RAF Staff College course at Andover in 1922

The RAF Staff College at RAF Andover was the first Royal Air Force staff college to be established. Its role was the training of officers in the administrative, staff and policy aspects of air force matters.

== History ==
=== Foundation ===
Following the foundation of the RAF in April 1918 and the end of the First World War in November 1918, there was a determination to maintain the Air Force as an independent service rather than let the Army and Royal Navy control air operations again. Therefore, the creation of an RAF Staff College to parallel the Army Staff College and the Royal Naval Staff College was an important element in fully establishing the RAF.

On 14 November 1921, Air Commodore Robert Brooke-Popham was tasked with setting up the RAF Staff College. On 1 April the following year, the new RAF Staff College came into being with Brooke-Popham as its first commandant. The Staff College was based at RAF Andover and was subordinate to Inland Area.

The dog seen in the photograph on Robert Brooke-Popham's lap was Jane who was buried in the Staff College grounds. The gravestone still exists and was the only remaining memorial to the college in 2010.

From its foundation and through the 1920s and 1930s, the Staff College provided training to selected officers (usually promising flight lieutenants or squadron leaders) to prepare them for staff duties at the Air Ministry or at Command or Group headquarters.

=== Changes during and after the Second World War ===
Although the college was closed on 3 September 1939, the day the British declaration of war was made, it reopened the same November running shorter courses. However, the next year on 28 May 1940, the college closed again. The RAF reopened its staff college at Bulstrode Park in December 1941. The college at Bulstrode Park was later reduced in size and only offered training to allied and foreign air force officers. When Bulstrode Park closed in 1948, this smaller College returned to Andover and its role in training overseas officers was continued. It was not until 1970 that the Staff College at Andover finally closed when it was absorbed into the RAF Staff College at Bracknell.

== Commandants ==
=== 1922 to 1940 ===
- 1 April 1922 Air Vice-Marshal H R M Brooke-Popham
- 28 March 1926 Air Commodore E R Ludlow-Hewitt
- 7 September 1930 Air Commodore P B Joubert de la Ferté
- 12 December 1933 Air Vice-Marshal W R Freeman
- 1 January 1936 Air Marshal Sir Arthur Barratt
- 1939 Unknown

=== 1948 to 1970 ===
From 1941 to 1948 a single RAF staff college was located at Bulstrode Park which had its own commandant.

- 26 July 1948 Air Commodore L W Cannon
- 1949 Air Commodore J N T Stephenson
- 31 March 1952 Air Commodore W G Cheshire
- 25 April 1953 Air Commodore G. P. Chamberlain
- 1 May 1954 Air Commodore D W Lane
- 21 April 1958 Air Commodore E D McK Nelson
- 3 October 1960 Air Commodore N C Hyde
- 24 September 1962 Air Commodore C V D Willis
- 3 March 1965 Air Commodore W D Hodgkinson
- 7 March 1966 Air Commodore P O V Green
- 7 October 1968 Air Commodore J A G Jackson

== Notable alumni ==
- Allan Perry-Keene, British Air Vice Marshal and first Air Officer Commanding of the Royal Pakistan Air Force
- Haider Raza, Pakistani Air Vice Marshal and Chief of Staff
- Asghar Khan, Pakistani Air Marshal and 2nd Commander-in-Chief
- Nur Khan, Pakistani Air Marshal and 3rd Commander-in-Chief
- Mohammad Akhtar, Pakistani Air Vice Marshal and Deputy Chief of Air Staff
