= Sitara-e-Basalat =

Sitara-e-Basalat ستارہِ بسالت
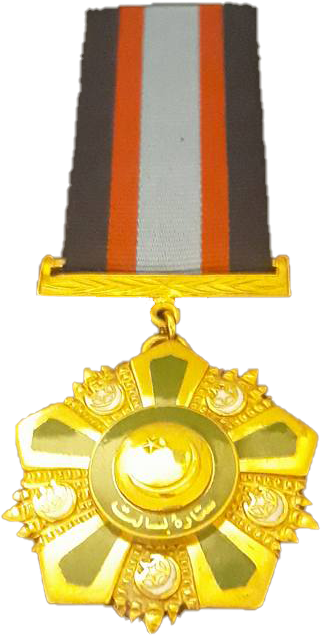
- Type: Gallantry Award
- Awarded for: "... acts of valour, courage & devotion"
- Presented by: Government of Pakistan
- Post-nominals: Sbt; SBt
- Ribbon
- Status: Currently Awarded
- Established: On 16 March 1957 by the President of Pakistan

Precedence
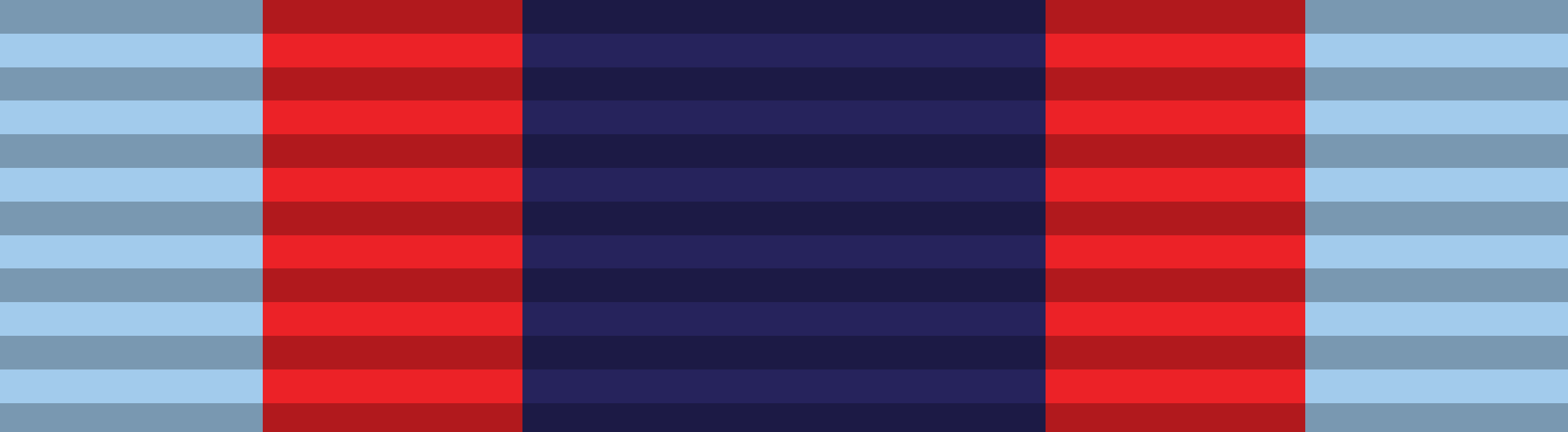
- Next (lower): Tamgha-e-Basalat

Sitara-e-Basalat (Urdu: ستارہِ بسالت, lit. 'Star of Valour') is a gallantry (courageous behaviour, especially in battle) award of Pakistan Armed Forces given to individuals for distinguished acts of gallantry, valor or courage while performing their duty

It is given by the President of Pakistan on the recommendation of a service chief.

== Notable recipients ==
- FS Hussain
- Abdul Razzaq Anjum
- Sawar Khan
- Imtiaz Bhatti
- Abdur Rahim Khan
- Bilal Omer Khan
- Rizwan Ullah Khan
- Asif Nawaz Janjua
- Sanaullah Khan Niazi
- Abdul Waheed Kakar
- Akhtar Abdur Rahman
- Rahimuddin Khan
- Hamid Gul
- Mushaf Ali Mir
- Mansurul Haq
- Aziz Khan (general)
- Fasih Bokhari
- Zahirul Islam Abbasi
- Ahmad Tasnim
- Muhammad Ghulam Tawab
- Javed Nasir
- Tanvir Mahmood Ahmed
- Talat Masood
- Abbas Khattak
- Khalid Mahmud Arif
- Fazle Haq
- Arif Bangash
- Farooq Feroze Khan
- Cecil Chaudhry
- Imran Ullah Khan
- Ghulam Safdar Butt
- Shamim Alam Khan
- Abdul Aziz Mirza
- Iqbal Khan (general)
- PQ Mehdi
- Rao Qamar Suleman
- Hakimullah Khan Durrani
- Jamal A. Khan
- Iftikhar Ahmed Sirohey
- Zahid Ali Akbar Khan
- Saeed Mohammad Khan
- Yastur-ul-Haq Malik
- Zafar Masud
- Mirza Aslam Beg
- Flt Lt Hussain Muhammad Musaddiq
- Tariq Mehmood
- Hifazat Ullah Khan
- Ghulam Jilani Khan
- Sharbat Ali Changezi
- Capt Hafeez Ullah
- Capt. Abdullah Khan (Shaheed) 32 Baloch Regiment
- Avn. (Off) Cdt Sameer Shah
- Avn. (Off) Cdt Adil Bin Fazal
- Avn. Cdt Hakim Ejaz
- Avn. Cdt Murtaza Ali
- Avn. Cdt Fahad Khan
- Col Mujeeb Ur Rehman (Shaheed)
- Lt. Arsalan Aslam Satti (Shaheed)
- Cpt. Khizar Satti (Shaheed)
- Hav. Shoaib Ali (Shaheed)
- Cpt. Safar Khan (Shaheed)
- N/Sub. Nazir Ahmed (Shaheed)
- Capt. Mearaj Muhammad (Shaheed)
- Maj. Mudassar Sagheer Satti (Shaheed)
- Capt. Maula Gul Afghani (shaheed) 4 april 1959
- Brig Nusrat Khan Sial

== See also ==
- Awards and decorations of the Pakistan Armed Forces
