= Leslie William Cannon =

RAF Air Vice Marshal

- Born: 9 April 1904
- Died: 27 January 1986 (aged 81); Princess Mary Hospital, RAF Halton, Buckinghamshire
- Burial place: Penn, Buckinghamshire
- Spouse: Beryl Heyworth
- Military career
- Allegiance: United Kingdom
- Branch: Royal Air Force
- Service years: 1920–58
- Rank: Air Vice-Marshal
- Nickname: "Bull"
- Commands: Commander-in-Chief Royal Pakistan Air Force (1951–55); RAF Staff College, Andover (1948–49); No. 85 Group (1946–47); No. 2 Group (1946); No. 138 Wing (1943); RAF Watton (1942–43); No. 5 Squadron (1937–38)
- Conflicts: North-West Frontier; Second World War
- Awards: Companion of the Order of the Bath; Commander of the Order of the British Empire; Mentioned in dispatches (4); Silver Star (United States)

Air Vice-Marshal Leslie William Cannon, CB, CBE (9 April 1904 – 27 January 1986) was a senior Royal Air Force officer. He served as Commander-in-Chief of the Royal Pakistan Air Force from 1951 to 1955.

== Military career ==
Cannon enlisted in the Royal Air Force (RAF) in the second entry of aircraft apprentices in 1920, and was commissioned as a pilot in 1925.

From 1948 until late 1949, Cannon was Assistant Commandant and then Commandant of the RAF Staff College, Andover.

He served as a Flight Commander in No. 60 Squadron RAF and then Officer Commanding No. 5 Squadron RAF on the North-West Frontier of India in the 1930s. Eventually attaining the rank of air vice-marshal (the first apprentice to achieve air rank), he served as Commander-in-Chief of the Royal Pakistan Air Force from 7 May 1951 to 19 June 1955.

Military offices
Preceded by Percy Maitland	Air Officer Commanding No. 2 Group; 1946–1946	Succeeded by Anthony Paxton
Preceded by Richard Atcherley	Commander-in-Chief, Royal Pakistan Air Force; 1951–1955	Succeeded by Arthur McDonald
