= Khyber Khan =

Pakistani Deputy Chief of Air Staff (1924-2007)

Air Vice Marshal Khyber Khan SQA
- خیبر خان
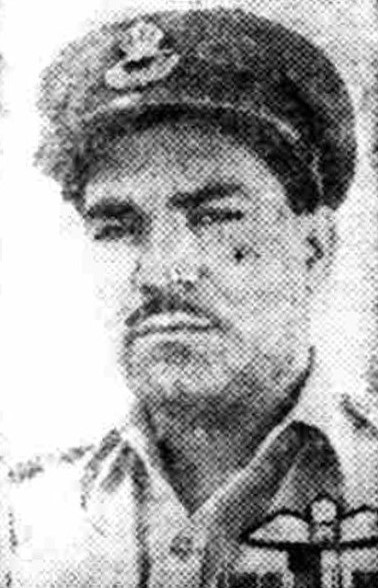
- Khyber Khan as a Wg Cdr, c. 1951

Deputy Chief of the Air Staff Pakistan Air Force
- In office 1 February 1969 – 19 March 1970 Serving with S. A. Yusuf (Chief of Staff)
- Commander-in-Chief: Air Marshal Nur Khan (1965-1969); Air Marshal Abdur Rahim Khan (1969-1972)
- Succeeded by: Eric G. Hall (as Chief of Staff)

7th Commandant PAF College
- In office January 1958 – December 1959
- Preceded by: B. K. Dass

Commander PAF Station Peshawar
- In office August 1950 – April 1951

Commander No. 14 Squadron PAF
- In office October 1948 – November 1949

Personal details
- Born: Mohammad Khyber Khan; 15 March 1924 Pabbi, North-West Frontier Province, British India
- Died: 27 July 2007 (aged 83) Pakistan
- Education: Government Gordon College; RAF Central Flying School; Air Command and Staff College; Joint Services Staff College (UK); Imperial Defence College

Military service
- Branch/service: Royal Indian Air Force (1942–1947); Pakistan Air Force (1947-1972)
- Years of service: 1942–1972
- Rank: Air Vice Marshal
- Commands: PAF College; PAF Station Peshawar; No. 14 Squadron PAF
- Battles/wars: World War II; Burma campaign; Indo-Pakistani War of 1947-1948; Waziristan rebellion (1948-1954); Indo-Pakistani War of 1965; Indo-Pakistani Air War of 1965
- Awards: Sitara-e-Quaid-e-Azam

Mohammad Khyber Khan (Note: Urdu: محمد خیبر خان) (15 March 1924 — 7 July 2007) was a Pakistani former two-star rank air officer and among the pioneer officers of the Pakistan Air Force, a fighter pilot, aerobatic pilot and diplomat.

Air Vice Marshal Khyber Khan and retired Air Marshal Asghar Khan were considered among the likely successors to President Ayub Khan during the collapse of his regime. Khyber was described as "a young, energetic, and popular air force officer in his early forties - who happens to look very much like a younger Ayub Khan."

== Early life and education ==
Mohammad Khyber Khan was born into a Pashtun family on 15 March 1924 in Pabbi, near Peshawar. He received his early education from Government Gordon College in Rawalpindi.

== Service years ==
=== Royal Indian Air Force (1942-1947) ===
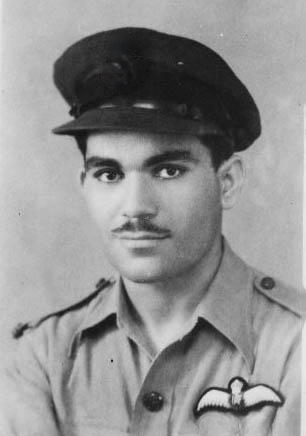
Plt Off Khyber Khan, c. 1942

Khyber Khan was commissioned into the Royal Indian Air Force (RIAF) on 21 December 1942 from the 15th course. He served with No. 22 Anti-Aircraft Co-operation Unit RIAF and 151 OTU from 15 June 1943 to 4 July 1944. Afterwards, he was a squadron pilot with No. 9 Sqn from 19 November 1944 to 30 August 1945.

Attempting to land his Harvard IIB at Cox's Bazar on 4 April 1945, it swung badly due to heavy crosswind, causing the undercarriage to collapse.

From 1 August 1945 to 18 January 1946, he was with No. 4 Squadron in Yelahanka and was attached as a squadron pilot to No. 2 Squadron. Before the Partition of British India in August 1947, Flight Lieutenant Khyber Khan was attached to the Advanced Flying School (India) in Ambala.

=== Pakistan Air Force (1947-1972) ===
After the partition, he opted for the Pakistan Air Force and was posted as Chief Flying Instructor PAF Conversion School.

Flt Lt. Khyber Khan was among several officers flying liaison missions in T-6 Harvards in the Indo-Pakistani War of 1947-1948. He delivered a dispatch from Kashmir regarding the successful Siege of Skardu carried out by the Pakistan Army.

On 15 September 1947, the RPAF Flying Training School was raised and the first training aircraft was airborne at 1005 hours on 22 September, flown by Flt Lt. Khyber Khan and his student Flight Cadet Akhtar.

Khyber Khan was the first to take flight in Pakistan's inaugural air display on Pakistan Day 1948, witnessed by 150,000 people. At precisely 11:00 AM, a Verey light signaled his takeoff. The crowd erupted in cheers as he performed thrilling spins and rolls in the sky.

Wing Commander Khyber Khan was selected to attend the Air Command and Staff College in the USA on 25 April 1951. During his time there, he presented the Commander of the college, General George Kenney, with a pictorial representation of both the USAF and RPAF shields, along with the emblem of the Royal Pakistan Air Force, in a ceremony. It was noted that Khan made these presentations as tokens of appreciation for the opportunity to attend the school and for the hospitality and friendship he received during his tour. He was one of 26 officers from 22 allied nations attending the school.

Khyber Khan was promoted to Air Commodore and appointed as Assistant Chief of Air Staff (Operations) on 26 December 1960.

The P.A.F. Golf Tournament concluded on 16 June 1961, with Wing Commander Jebb taking first place. Air Commodore Khyber Khan secured second place with a score of 70, followed by Squadron Leader Karim in third with 72. Air Marshal Asghar Khan and Air Commodore M. A. Rahman tied for the best gross score with 91 points each, but Asghar Khan was placed fourth due to lower handicaps. The final results were: Air Marshal Asghar Khan 73; Air Commodore M. A. Rehman 74; Air Commodore Qadir 89; Air Commodore Piracha 81; Air Commodore Khyber Khan 70; Group Captain Afridi 79; Wing Commander Misra 80; Wing Commander Marston 73; Wing Commander A. R. Rahman 75; Wing Commander Jebb 78; Squadron Leader Karim 72; Flt. Lt Ahmed 77.

==== Diplomatic career ====
Air Vice Marshal Khyber Khan was appointed as Pakistan's High Commissioner to Kenya and presented his credentials to President Kenyatta on 7 April 1970 with a salary of Rs. 2,200 (equivalent to Rs. 11,000 or US$40 in 2021). On 3 March 1972, Prime Minister Zulfikar Ali Bhutto announced the retirement of 43 senior Pakistan Armed Forces personnel including Khyber Khan.

He was appointed as Pakistan's Ambassador to Mauritania in 1975 and accredited to Mali, The Gambia and Senegal. He signed a trade agreement on 13 March 1975, with Ahmed Ould Die, Secretary General of the Ministry of Commerce of Mauritania, on behalf of their governments.

In 1978, Khyber Khan made a publication in the Pakistan Bar Council Journal.

He relinquished his position as Ambassador of Mauritania on the afternoon of 16 May 1979 and began a 33-day fully paid leave to Pakistan starting on 17 May.

== Death ==
Khyber Khan died on 27 July 2007 in Pakistan.

== Effective dates of promotion ==
Insignia	Rank	Date
	Air Vice Marshal	July 1968
	Air Commodore	26 December 1960
	Group Captain	2 January 1958
	Wing Commander	1951
	Squadron Leader	October 1948
	Flight Lieutenant	August 1947
	Flying Officer	21 December 1943
	Pilot Officer	21 June 1943
