= General duty clause =

The General Duty Clause of the United States Occupational Safety and Health Act (Federal OSHA) states:

29 U.S.C. § 654, 5(a)1: Each employer shall furnish to each of his employees employment and a place of employment which are free from recognized hazards that are causing or are likely to cause death or serious physical harm to his employees."

29 U.S.C. § 654, 5(a)2: Each employer shall comply with occupational safety and health standards promulgated under this act.

29 U.S.C. § 654, 5(b): Each employee shall comply with occupational safety and health standards and all rules, regulations, and orders issued pursuant to this Act which are applicable to his own actions and conduct.

== Application of the General Duty Clause ==
The general duty provisions are used in inspections only where there are no specific standards applicable to the particular hazard involved. Any recognized hazard created in part by a condition not covered by a standard may be cited under the general duty clause. A hazard is recognized if it is a condition that is (a) of a common knowledge or general recognition in the particular industry in which it occurred, and (b) detectable (1) by means of the senses (sight, smell, touch, and hearing), or (2) is such wide, general recognition as a hazard in the industry that even if it is not detectable by means of the senses, there are generally known and accepted tests for its existence which should be generally known to the employer. In addition, "Voluntary Standards" also meet the preceding criteria for identifying a hazard. Citations based on the general duty clause are limited to alleged serious violations (including willful and/or repeated violations which would not otherwise qualify as serious violations, except for their willful or repeated nature).

== Clean Air Act ==
Under the Clean Air Act Section 112(r)(1), the General Duty Clause states: “The owners and operators of stationary sources producing, processing, handling or storing such substances (i.e., a chemical in 40 CFR part 68 or any other extremely hazardous substance) have a general duty [in the same manner and to the same extent as the general duty clause in the Occupational Safety and Health Act (OSHA)] to identify hazards which may result from (such) releases using appropriate hazard assessment techniques, to design and maintain a safe facility taking such steps as are necessary to prevent releases, and to minimize the consequences of accidental releases which do occur.”
