= Air chief marshal (Pakistan) =

Highest rank in Pakistan Air Force

- Four-stars, crossed swords and laurel device worn by a Pakistani air chief marshal
- Country: Pakistan
- Service branch: Pakistan Air Force
- Abbreviation: ACM
- Rank: Four-star
- Next higher rank: Marshal of the air force (currently not held)
- Next lower rank: Air marshal
- Equivalent ranks: Admiral (Pakistan Navy); General (Pakistan Army)

Air chief marshal /ɛərtʃifˈmɑːrʃl/ (abbreviated as Air Chf Mshl or ACM) is a four-star commissioned air officer rank and title officially used to denote supreme commander in the Pakistan Air Force for command and control. It is bestowed and commissioned by the Islamic Republic of Pakistan to a three-star air marshal officer, and while it is officially described as the highest rank in uniformed services of Pakistan, it is equivalent to the rank of admiral of navy and general of army. Since it is purposely designed to make a position advancement from three-star to a four-star rank, it ranks above the Air marshal and below Marshal of the air force, although "marshal of the air force" rank is currently not held by any military leader in Pakistan. However, a four-star air chief marshal falls under the Field marshal rank of army which is a distinct one from the air force's ranking system. The four-star air chief marshal helds the chief of air staff in the country once it is decorated with a five-star insignia.

Air chief marshal can be referred to four-star air marshal with a country-specific unofficial abbreviation "Air Chf MshlPAF" or "ACMPAF" to distinguish it from the corresponding rank of Air chief marshal used in other countries, sovereign states, or dependent territories identified with their own country codes. (Note: this source indicates that the rank of "Air Chief Marshal" is also used in the UK) (Note: dictionary terms, 2 shows corresponding rank used by several countries other than Pakistan)

== Appointment ==
A four-star air marshal is directly appointed or promoted by the President of Pakistan, however appointment with position advancement recommendations are made by the prime minister under the air force article 243 and "Air Force Act, 1953" of the Constitution of Pakistan. The corresponding position advancement such as appointing to the "chief of the air staff" is done accordingly.

An air chief marshal age is set to 64 (maximum) under the influence of article 243 as described by the Law of Pakistan. Once the tenure of ACM is decided or enforced by the president in a joint effort with the prime minister, air chief marshal helds the command and control of air force. However, article 243 is not applicable to a four-star air chief marshal during his tenure at Joint Chiefs of Staff Committee.
