= Deputy Chief of the Air Staff (Pakistan) =

Principal staff officers of Pakistan Air Force

- Pakistan Air Force
- Type: Principal staff officers of Pakistan Air Force
- Abbreviation: DCAS
- Reports to: Chief of the Air Staff
- Seat: Air Headquarters, Islamabad
- Unofficial names: Deputy Air Chief
- Deputy: Assistant Chief of the Air Staff
- Website: www.paf.gov.pk

Deputy Chief of the Air Staff (DCAS) refers to several principal staff officers of the Pakistan Air Force (PAF), reporting under the Chief of the Air Staff.

== List of Deputy Chief of Air Staff ==
As of December 2022, PAF lists the following positions:

- Deputy Chief of the Air Staff (Operations) – DCAS(O)
- Deputy Chief of the Air Staff (Engineering) – DCAS(E)
- Deputy Chief of the Air Staff (Administration) – DCAS(A)
- Deputy Chief of the Air Staff (Training) – DCAS(T)
- Deputy Chief of the Air Staff (Personnel) – DCAS(P)
- Deputy Chief of the Air Staff (Support) – DCAS(S)
- Deputy Chief of the Air Staff (Air Defence) – DCAS(AD)
- Deputy Chief of the Air Staff (National Aerospace Science and Technology Park) – DCAS(NASTP)

== See also ==
- Deputy Chief of Air Force (Australia)
- Deputy Chief of the Air Staff (India)
- Deputy Chief of the Air Staff (United Kingdom)
- Deputy Chief of the Naval Staff (Pakistan)
- Deputy Chief of the Army Staff (Pakistan)
