= Air marshal (Pakistan) =

Second-highest rank of the Pakistan Air Force

- Flag of an Air marshal in Pakistan Air Force

- Three-stars, crossed swords and laurel device worn by a Pakistani air marshal
- Country: Pakistan
- Service branch: Pakistan Air Force
- Abbreviation: AM, AIRMSHL
- Rank: Three-star
- Non-NATO rank: OF-8
- Next higher rank: Air chief marshal
- Next lower rank: Air vice-marshal
- Equivalent ranks: Vice Admiral; Lieutenant general

Air marshal /ɛərˈmɑːrʃl/ (abbreviated as AM or AIRMSHL) is a commissioned three-star military rank in Pakistan Air Force with a NATO's equivalent rank code of OF-8. It ranks above two-star air vice marshal and below four-star air chief marshal, and while it is the second-highest rank of a military branch in uniformed services distinct from navy and army, it is equivalent to Vice admiral of navy and lieutenant general of army.

Promotion to the rank of air marshal requires a solid record of military achievement by an air vice marshal. However, the rank is also used for fighter pilots as a position advancement. A two-star military aviator with no history of violations and immorality are promoted to the three-star rank in air force.

== Appointment and promotion ==
Air marshal is directly appointed and promoted by the federal government in accordance with rules and regulations of air force ordinance. An officer with two-star rank (air vice marshal) is appointed to the rank of air marshal throughout the Pakistan air force history. It helds air chief marshal ranks upon next promotion.

== Statutory limits ==
Since it is the second-highest rank coupled with additional powers and benefits, the law of Pakistan restricts the use of unsanctioned power by a three-star marshal and can be constraint under a certain constitutional amendment.

== See also ==
- List of serving air marshals of the Pakistan Air Force
