= Air Headquarters (Pakistan) =

Pakistani military headquarters

Coordinates: 33.7230°N 73.0082°E

Air Headquarters
- AHQ
- Islamabad in Pakistan

Site information
- Owner: Pakistan Air Force
- Website: www.paf.gov.pk

Air Headquarters (AHQ) is the Headquarters of Pakistan Air Force, located in Islamabad. Initially it was established at Peshawar on 15 August 1947. Later it was moved to Karachi on 1 June 1948 and back to Peshawar in 1960. In 1983 construction of Air headquarters was started at Islamabad after it was decided to have all the armed forces headquarters in the capital city. On 1 August 2005 the headquarters was moved from Chaklala, Rawalpindi to Islamabad. During the construction of the headquarter's building at Islamabad the headquarters directorates were housed at PAF base Chaklala.

== Command Structure ==
There are nine branches at AHQ each commanded by Air marshal rank officer, and several directorates headed by Air vice-marshal rank officers.

1.Chief of Air Staff Secretariat

- Advisor (Administration) to Chief of the Air Staff
- Advisor (Operations, Audit & Evaluation Cell) to Chief of the Air Staff, AHQ
- Advisor (Engineering) to Chief of the Air Staff

2.Vice Chief of the Air Staff Branch, VCAS-Branch

- Director General, Air Intelligence
- Air Force Strategic Command
- Director General, Security (DG Security)
- Inspector General Air Force

3. Chairman, Pakistan Aeronautical Complex Board (Chairman PACB), Kamra.

- Managing Director, Mirage Rebuild Factory (MD MRF), PAC, Kamra
- Managing Director, Aircraft Rebuild Factory, Kamra
- Managing Director, Avionics Production Factory (MD APF), Kamra
- Managing Director, Aircraft Manufacturing Factory (MD AMF), Kamra
- Chairman, Pakistan Aeronautical Complex Board (Chairman PACB), Kamra

4. Deputy Chief of Air Staff Training (DCAS-T)

- Air Officer Commanding, PAF Airmen Academy (AOC PAA) Korangi Creek, Karachi
- Director General, Training (DG Training)
- Chief Instructor, Allied Officers Division (CI AOD), National Defence University (NDU)
- President, Air War College Institute (President AWCI)
- Principal, School of Electrical Engineering & Computer Science (Principal SEECS), NUST
- Air Officer Commanding, Pakistan Air Force Academy Asghar Khan (AOC PAF Academy Asghar Khan)

5. Deputy Chief of Air Staff Engineering (DCAS-E)

- Director General, Aerospace Engineering
- Director, Precision Engineering Complex (Director PEC)
- Director General, Pakistan Air Force Airworthiness Certification Authority
- Principal, School of Electrical Engineering & Computer Science (Principal SEECS), NUST
- Director General, NUTECH Office of Research, Industrialization, Internationalization and Commercialization (DG NORIIC)

6. Deputy Chief of Air Staff Operations (DCAS-O)

- Director General, Warfare & Strategy (DG W & S)
- Director General, Air Operations (DG AO)
- Director General, Command, Control, Communications, Computers and Intelligence (DG C4I)

7. Deputy Chief of Air Staff Air Defence (DCAS-AD)

- Air Officer Commanding, Air Defence Command (AOC ADC)

8. Deputy Chief of Air Staff Administration (DCAS-A)

- Director General, Administration

9. Deputy Chief of Air Staff National Aerospace Science and Technology Park (DCAS-NASTP)

- Director General, Operations, National Aerospace Science and Technology Park (DG Operations, NASTP)
- Director General, Development, National Aerospace Science and Technology Park (DG Development, NASTP)
- Chief Project Director & Chief Executive Officer, National Aerospace Science & Technology Park (CPD & CEO NASTP)

10. Chief Project Director, JF-17, (CPD JF-17).

- Deputy Chief Project Director JF-17 (Deputy CPD, JF-17)

11. Deputy Chief of Air Staff-Support (DCAS-Support)

12. Deputy Chief of Air Staff- Projects (DCAS-PJ)

- Director General, Projects (DG Projects)

13. Deputy Chief of the Air Staff, Personnel (DCAS-P)

- Director General, Personnel (DG Personnel)
- Director General, Welfare & Rehabilitation (DG W & R),

== See also ==
- Joint Staff Headquarters (Pakistan)
- General Headquarters (Pakistan Army)
- Naval Headquarters (Pakistan)
