= Sharbat Ali Changezi =

Pakistani Air Marshal (born 1933)

Air Marshal Sharbat Ali Changezi HI(M) SI(M) SBt
- شربت علی چنگیزی
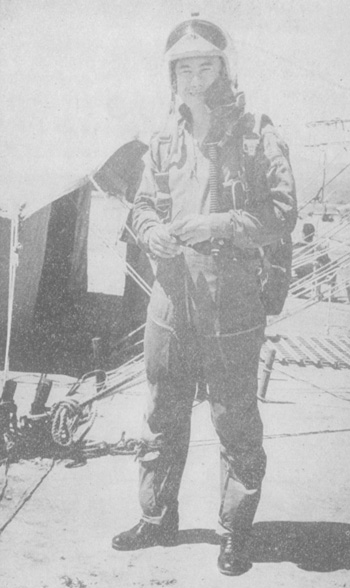
- Changezi in 1966

Commander PAF Base Masroor
- In office June 1980 – July 1982
Preceding Commands
Commander PAF Base Peshawar
In office July 1976 – August 1978
Commanding No. 19 Squadron PAF
In office December 1972 – February 1973
Officer Commanding No. 26 Squadron PAF
In office October 1971 – January 1972
Preceded by	Middlecoat
Succeeded by	MM Alam
Officer Commanding No. 16 Squadron PAF
In office March 1970 – October 1971
Officer Commanding No. 25 Squadron PAF
In office June 1966 – February 1968
Preceded by	MG Tawab
Officer Commanding No. 17 Squadron PAF
In office 6 August 1962 – 14 January 1965
Succeeded by	Azim Daudpota

Personal details
- Born: 19 May 1933 (age 93) Quetta, Baluchistan (Chief Commissioner's Province)
- Relatives: General Musa Khan (father-in-law)

Military service
- Branch/service: Pakistan Air Force
- Years of service: 1949–1987
- Rank: Air Marshal
- Commands: PAF Base Masroor; PAF Base Peshawar; No. 26 Squadron PAF; No. 25 Squadron PAF; No. 16 Squadron PAF; No. 17 Squadron PAF
- Battles/wars: Indo-Pakistani war of 1965; Indo-Pakistani Air War of 1965; Indo-Pakistani war of 1971; Battle of Basantar
- Awards: See list

Sharbat Ali Changezi (Note: Urdu: شربت على ݘݩگݐڒی) (born 10 March 1932) is a retired three-star rank air officer of the Pakistan Air Force and former fighter pilot.

In 1955, Changezi notably refused to meet the Afghan Monarch Zahir Shah, while he was on visit to Pakistan, because of the ill-treatment meted out to the Hazara people in Afghanistan.

== Early life and family ==
Sharbat Ali Changezi was born on 10 March 1932 in Quetta. His father, Haji Ahmed Ali, was the chief of the Behsudi (Hazara tribe) in Quetta and died in April 1976.

Sharbat's brother, Shoukat Ali Changezi, who is 20 years younger, started his bodybuilding career at a small club in a run-down building in Quetta City. His dedication to the sport, along with the support from committed but uncertified elders, helped him advance. This support enabled him to move to Norway, where he fully realized his potential. Shortly after his arrival, he gained international recognition in bodybuilding, winning titles such as Mr. Oslo and Mr. Norway twice. He is now a prominent figure in the bodybuilding community in Scandinavia.

Sharbat's sister, Professor Fatima Changezi, was the first among Hazara women to graduate from college. She became a teacher at the Government Girls College, Quetta where she taught Persian.

In 1976, Sharbat recalled, "My sister Fatima Changezi was the first Hazara girl who went to a college, immediately there after the late Shaikh Al-Haj Ali Nazar, a religious scholar, vituperated from the pulpit against my father, the late Haji Ahmed Ali Khan, for sending his daughter to college. This put an end to my sister's further studies. After a few years, however, the then Major (now retired Colonel) Barkat Ali spoke to my father and both of them resolved to send their daughters to college. Fatima Changezi is today a lecturer in Persian in the education department of Baluchistan. Colonel Barkat Ali's daughter is doing her doctorate in Persian in Tehran. It is interesting to note that Al-Haj Shaikh Ali Nazar, himself sent his daughter to school after about 20 years."

== Career with the Airforce ==
=== 1965 War service ===
Changezi was involved in a dogfight with Indian warplanes over Lahore district in which he and his wingman shot down Indian planes.

=== 1971 War service ===
During the 1971 war, Changezi was the officer commanding of the No. 26 Squadron of the PAF flying F-86 Sabres.

== Awards and decorations ==
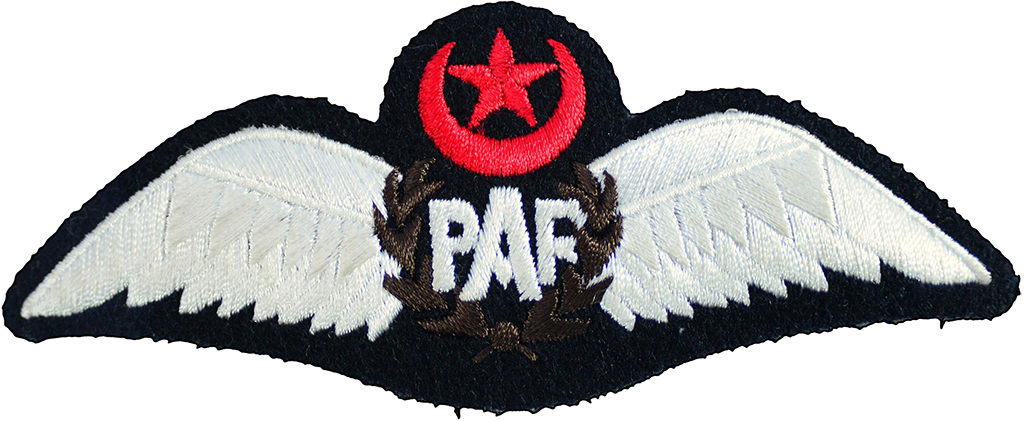

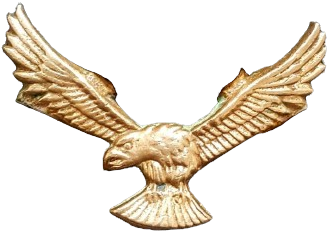

PAF GD(P) Badge RED (More than 3000 Flying Hours)
Golden Eagle Award (Pakistan) (Exceptional Fighter Pilot)
Hilal-i-Imtiaz (Military) (Crescent of Excellence)	Sitara-i-Imtiaz (Military) (Star of Excellence)		Sitara-e-Basalat (Star of Valour)
Tamgha-e-Diffa (Defence Medal): 1. 1965 War Clasp; 2. 1971 War Clasp	Sitara-e-Harb 1965 War (War Star 1965)	Sitara-e-Harb 1971 War (War Star 1971)	Tamgha-e-Jang 1965 War (War Medal 1965)
Tamgha-e-Jang 1971 War (War Medal 1971)	Tamgha-e-Sad Saala Jashan-e-Wiladat-e-Quaid-e-Azam (100th Birth Anniversary of Muhammad Ali Jinnah) 1976	Tamgha-e-Qayam-e-Jamhuria (Republic Commemoration Medal) 1956	Hijri Tamgha (Hijri Medal) 1979

== See also ==
- List of Hazara people
- List of people from Quetta
