= Spillover of the Soviet–Afghan War in Pakistan =

Spillover of the Soviet-Afghan War in Pakistan
- Part of the Soviet–Afghan War
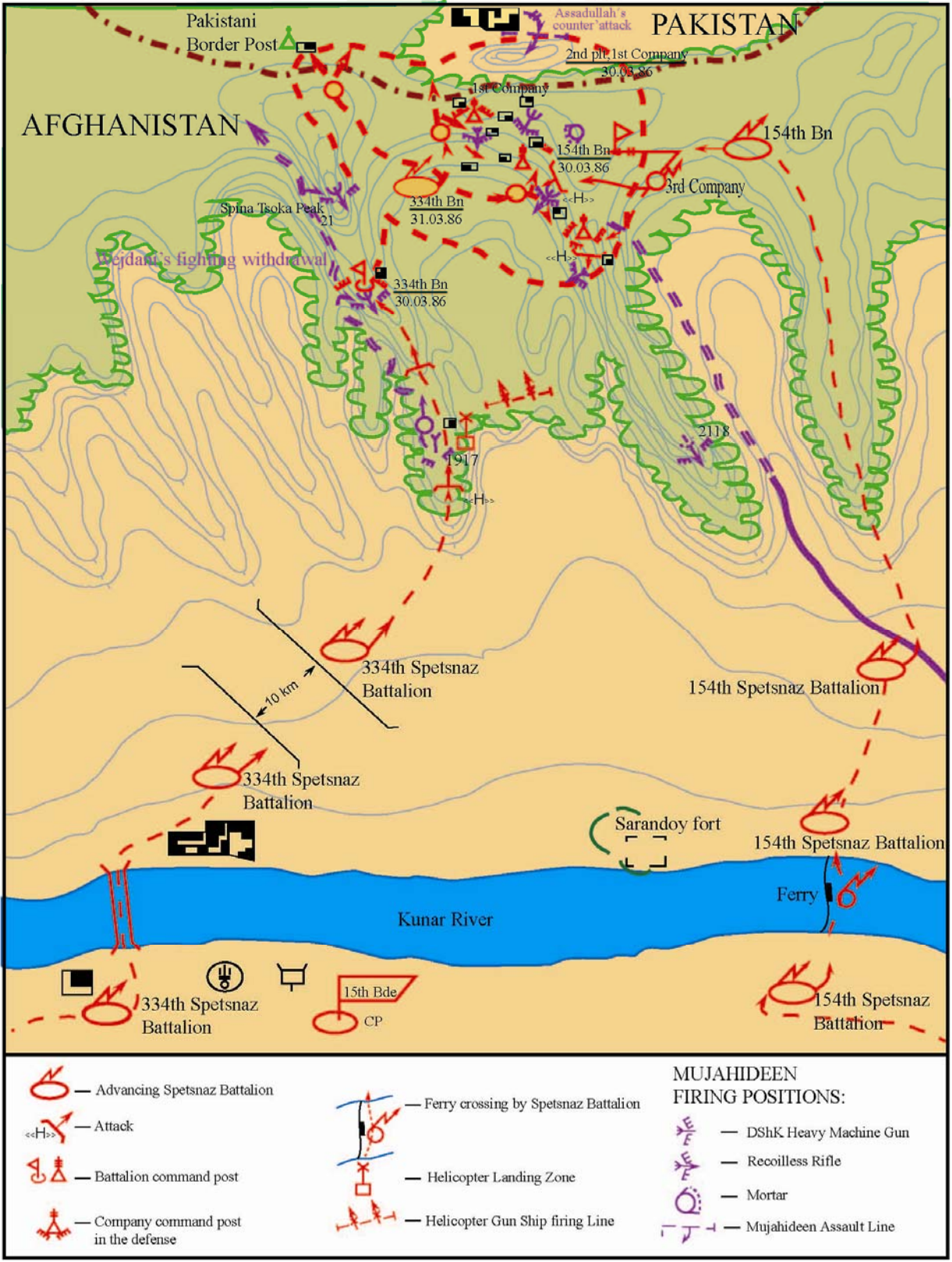
- Map of the 15th Spetsnaz Brigade's strike in Bajaur, Pakistan, c. January 1986
Date	1979–1989
Location	Pakistan, Afghanistan
Result	Soviet withdrawal from Afghanistan

Belligerents
Soviet Union; Afghanistan; Al-Zulfikar	Pakistan; Afghan Mujahideen

Commanders and leaders
(Soviet Union) Leonid Brezhnev # (Soviet Union) Yuri Andropov # (Soviet Union) Alexander Rutskoy (POW) (Afghanistan) Babrak Karmal (Afghanistan) Mohammad Najibullah	Zia-ul-Haq # Akhtar Abdur Rahman # Jamal A. Khan; Mirza Aslam Beg; Khalid Mahmud Arif; Mohammad Shariff; Gulbuddin Hekmatyar

Units involved
Afghan-Soviet forces: Forces involved: Soviet Armed Forces; Soviet Army; 40th Army; 66th Motorized Rifle Brigade; 345th Independent Guards Airborne Regiment; Spetsnaz; 15th Spetsnaz Brigade; 154th Spetsnaz Battalion; 334th Spetsnaz Battalion; Soviet Air Forces; 120th Guards Fighter Aviation Regiment; Soviet Airborne Forces; 345th Independent Guards Airborne Regiment; KGB; Afghan Armed Forces; Afghan Army; 11th Infantry Division; 12th Infantry Division; 14th Infantry Division; 15th Infantry Division; 18th Infantry Division; 21st Mechanised Infantry Brigade; KhAD-e-Nezami; Afghan Commando Forces; 37th Commando Brigade; 38th Commando Brigade (surrendered); 666th "Air Assault" Commando Regiment; 203rd Special Reconnaissance Battalion; Afghan Air Force; 355th Fighter-Bomber Air Regiment; 373rd Transport Aviation Regiment; 377th Independent Helicopter Regiment; Sarandoy	Pakistani forces: Forces involved: Pakistan Armed Forces; Pakistan Army; XI Corps; XII Corps; Frontier Force; Baloch Regiment; Northern Light Infantry; SSG; Pakistan Air Force; 9th Squadron "Griffins"; 11th Squadron "Arrows"; 14th Squadron "Tail Choppers"; 15th Squadron "Cobras"; 17th Squadron "Tigers"; 23rd Squadron "Talons"; 26th Squadron "Black Spiders"; Civil Armed Forces; Frontier Corps; FC KPK (N); FC KPK (S); FC Baloch (N); FC Baloch (S); (no border) Pakistani Intelligence community; Inter-Services Intelligence; Military Intelligence

Casualties and losses
Unknown killed and wounded 17 Aircraft Captured/Defected (Note: one Mil Mi-8 hijacked and defected on 26 April 1981, a Mig-17 crashed during a defection attempt in October 1982, an unspecified helicopter in late October 1982, one Su-7 defected on 20 November 1983, one Mil Mi-25 defected on 16 July 1984, an An-26 defected on 22 September 1984, two Mil Mi-24s defected on 28 June 1985, six Mil Mi-8 captured on 2 April 1986, a Mig-21 defected on 23 October 1986, two Mil Mi-4 defected on 3 October 1987); Per Pakistan: 10 Aircraft shot down (Note: including two Su-22s on 17 May 1986, an An-26 on 31 March 1987, a Su-22 on 16 April 1987, a Su-25 on 4 August 1987, a Mig-25 on 7 September 1988, two Mig-23s on 12 September 1988, a Su-22 on 3 November 1988 and an unspecified cargo aircraft on 19 Movement 1988); Per Soviet Union: 5 Aircraft shot down (Note: including three Su-22s, a Su-25 and an An-26)	/ Pakistan: 5,775 killed; 6,804 wounded; 1 F-16 fighter aircraft lost/shot down (Note: lost to friendly fire, according to Pakistan and shot down, according to Afghan authorities) and a helicopter shot down

The spillover of the Soviet–Afghan War in Pakistan refers to a series of airstrikes, ground skirmishes and other military confrontations which took place inside Pakistan as a result of the Soviet-Afghan war.

Due to the Soviet Union's steadfast support for India, which contributed to the loss of Pakistani territory in the years leading up to the Soviet-Afghan War, Pakistani leaders moved to support the mujahideen in their fight against the Soviets. Western powers provided financial support to Pakistan in exchange for their involvement. The Pakistani military trained mujahideen and produced volunteers to help Afghan forces. As a result, there were attacks on Pakistan by both the Soviets and communist Afghan groups.

During this period, millions of Afghans fled to Pakistan for safety. The consequences of this were great and long-lasting: the Inter-Services Intelligence (ISI) agency established madrasas along the Afghan border, which fostered a dual religious and political ideology that contributed to the establishment of the Taliban. In the decades since the Soviet-Afghan War, there have continued to be disputes over territory and immigration between Pakistan and Afghanistan.

== Background ==
A German database showing the channelling of the money and weapons, provided by ISI officer Mohammad Yousaf in his book: Afghanistan – The Bear Trap: The Defeat of a Superpower

Shortly after the invasion, Pakistani President Muhammad Zia-ul-Haq chaired a meeting of his military government. At this meeting, Zia asked the Chief of Army Staff General Khalid Mahmud Arif and the Chairman of the Joint Chiefs of Staff Admiral Muhammad Shariff to lead a specialized civil-military team to formulate a geo-strategy to counter the Soviet aggression. At this meeting, the Director-General of the ISI at that time, Lieutenant-General Akhtar Abdur Rahman advocated for an idea of covert operation in Afghanistan by arming the Islamic extremist. As for Pakistan, the Soviet war with the Islamist mujahideen was viewed as retaliation for the Soviet Union's long unconditional support of regional rival, India, notably during the 1965 and the 1971 wars, which led to the loss of Pakistani territory to the new state of Bangladesh.

After the Soviet deployment, Pakistan's military ruler General Muhammad Zia-ul-Haq started accepting financial aid from the Western powers to aid the Mujahideen, despite Leonid Brezhnev's opposition. In 1981, following the election of US President Ronald Reagan, aid for the Mujahidin through Zia's Pakistan significantly increased, mostly due to the efforts of Texas Congressman Charlie Wilson and CIA officer Gust Avrakotos.

The Pakistan Navy were involved in the covert war coordinating foreign weapons being funnelled into Afghanistan. Some of the navy's high-ranking admirals were responsible for storing those weapons in their depots.

ISI allocated the highest percentage of covert aid to warlord Gulbuddin Hekmatyar, leader of the Hezb-e-Islami faction. This was based on his record as an effective anti-Soviet military commander in Afghanistan. Further, Hekmatyar and his men had "almost no grassroots support and no military base inside Afghanistan", and thus were more "dependent on Zia-ul-Haq's protection and financial largesse" than other Mujahiden factions. In retaliation for Pakistan's assistance to the insurgents, the KHAD Afghan security service, under leader Mohammad Najibullah, carried out (according to the Mitrokhin Archives and other sources) a large number of operations against Pakistan. In 1987, 127 incidents resulted in 234 deaths in Pakistan. In April 1988, an ammunition depot outside the Pakistani capital of Islamabad was blown up, killing 100 and injuring more than 1000 people. The KHAD and KGB were suspected of perpetrating these acts. Soviet fighters and Democratic Republic of Afghanistan Air Force bombers occasionally bombed Pakistani villages along the Pakistani-Afghan border. The target of Soviet and Afghan fighters and bombers were Afghan refugee camps on Pakistan side of the border. These attacks are known to have caused at least 300 civilian deaths and extensive damage. Soviet and Afghan forces were also involved in dogfights with responding Pakistani jets.

Pakistan actively trained the mujahedin rebels, which resulted in Afghan communist leaders ordering airstrikes in Pakistan at rebel targets. Many secular Pakistanis outside of the government were worried about fundamentalists guerrillas in Afghanistan, such as Hekmatyar, receiving such a high amount of aid, leading to the bolstering of conservative Islamic forces in Pakistan and its military.

Pakistan also provided volunteers who went to Afghanistan in order to fight, their numbers estimated at around 40,000 by General Mirza Aslam Beg, a former chief of the Pakistan Army.

Pakistan took in millions of Afghan refugees (mostly Pashtun) fleeing the Soviet occupation. Although the refugees were concentrated within Pakistan's largest province, Balochistan, at the time under martial law under General Rahimuddin Khan, the influx of so many refugees – believed to be the largest refugee population in the world – spread into several other regions.

All of this had a heavy impact on Pakistan and its effects continue to this day. Pakistan, through its support for the Mujahidin, played a significant role in the eventual withdrawal of Soviet military personnel from Afghanistan.

== Timeline ==
A table covering the spillover incidents of the Soviet-Afghan War in Pakistan from 1980 to 1988 is as follows:

Year (Note: Data for 1979 and 1989 not included)	Terrorist Blasts		Artillery Attacks		Air Attacks	
	Total Incidents	Fatalities	Violations	Fatalities	Violations	Fatalities
1980	0	0	25	0	174	2
1981	0	0	17	0	94	5
1982	2	0	22	0	59	0
1983	47	4	41	0	93	0
1984	28	8	49	38	119	133
1985	118	96	121	25	256	19
1986	487	216	495	56	779	39
1987	540	428	619	36	684	305
1988	1,465	1,186	1,583	1,041	867	1,234
Total	2,287	1,938	2,972	1,196	3,125	1,737

=== 1979 ===
On 18 March 1979, a Soviet APC carrying troops entered Pakistani territory, demanding that three Afghan personnel who had defected be handed over to them. However, Pakistani authorities refused, prompting the Soviets to launch 123 rounds of artillery fire from T-55 tanks in Torkham, forcing Pakistan to hand over the three Afghan defectors, two days later on 20 March.

=== 1980 ===
On 1 March, PAF intercepted a Soviet Ilyushin Il-76 aircraft and escorted it out of Pakistani airspace, back to Afghanistan.

On 4 May 1980, a building operated by Afghan Mujahideen in Pakistan was bombed, 11 people were killed.

On 25 November, eight people were caught and charged with spying on behalf of the Soviet Union by Pakistani authorities.

=== 1981 ===
The far-left militant faction al-Zulfikar hijacked the Pakistan International Airlines Flight 326 with support from KHAD and KGB on 14 March 1981 and the ensuing hostage crisis ended with the release of 50 prisoners by Pakistan.

On 26 April 1981, a DRAAF Mil Mi-8 helicopter was hijacked from Qandahar and landed at the PAF Base Samungli The helicopter numbered 285, during post-maintenance flight test from Kandahar Air Base by Captain Jamal ud Din.

On 8 September 1981, Afghan troops raided the village of Shabbaz Killy inside Pakistan to confiscate weaponry, wounding five people in the process. The Pakistani government claimed that around 40 Afghan troops came in trucks and APCs and retreated before the arrival of Pakistani Forces. Pakistan also claimed that the village had been attacked by Mig-17 aircraft in the week earlier.

On 2 December 1981, a helicopter gunship fired by Afghan forces killed seven people in Balochistan. On 18 December, six Afghan helicopters again attacked a refugee camp, this time in South Waziristan, killing a child and destroying two houses.

=== 1982 ===
In early October 1982, an Afghan defector moving towards Pakistan was killed as his Mig-17 crashed near the border in Chaman, but a helicopter was able to successfully make it across the border, later that month.

=== 1983 ===
In May 1983, the No. 17 Squadron while operating from Samungli Airbase along with the No. 23 Squadron "Talons" was put on air defence alert after a surge in aerial intrusions by Afghan and Soviet warplanes during the Soviet-Afghan war. It performed 682 CAP missions and 238 hot scrambles. Unfortunately, the record of the aerial interceptions and other events was not maintained.

On 17 September 1983, Afghan MIG-21s violated Pakistani airspace with the possible aim of targeting Mujahideen camps. The aircraft conducted a bombing raid in Parachinar, killing a man. Pakistan condemned the attack and summoned Afghan officials. A protest was held in Parachinar against the attack during the Islamic holy event of Eid ul adha.

On November 20, 1983, Captain Mohammed Nabi Korinzay defected to Pakistan with his Su-7BM fighter-bomber. The aircraft broke up during a crash landing on the runway at Dalbandin.

=== 1984 ===
On 16 July, an Afghan Mi-25 helicopter defected and landed in Miranshah.

On 13 August 1984, DRAAF bombed targets in Parachinar. On 14 August 1984, three Afghan aircraft bombed Kunj Alizai, near the village of Nisti Kot killing one and injuring five women. The next day, on 15 August, two Afghan jets again violated Pakistani airspace dropping two bombs over Pewar Kotal region, killing 13 people and injuring five. On 18, 19, and 21 August, Afghan Army conducted artillery strikes in Parachinar, followed by an airstrike on 23 August.

On 22 September 1984, Colonel Haji Fakir, flying an An-26 of the 373rd Transport Aviation Regiment defected from Afghanistan to Miranshah Air Base, Pakistan.

On 2 October 1984, Afghanistan denied the Pakistani claim of its forces conducting a bombardment campaign in Tari Mangal which had killed 33 people and injured 48.

=== 1985 ===
On 24 January, Pakistani authorities said that 2 Afghan aircraft had violated Pakistani airspace for three days near Arandu and had dropped two bombs, but caused no damage.

On 14 April, Pakistan claimed that two Afghan jets violated Pakistani airspace near Chitral and dropped two bombs, they also accused Afghanistan of further violations near Arandu. The accusations, however, were rejected by Afghanistan.

A POW uprising took place on 26–27 April 1985 in Badaber, when Soviet and Afghan POWs revolted at the fortress of Badaber where they were being held captive. The Jamaat-e-Islami forces and the Pakistani Army's XI Corps suppressed the rebellion. Most of the POWs were killed in the uprising while inflicting heavy casualties on the mujahideen and Pakistani forces and also managing to blow 3 BM-21 Grad MLRS, 2 million rounds of ammunition and thousands of rockets.

In mid-1985, the Soviet Union and Kabul launched psychological warfare against Pakistan in an attempt to morally destabilize society. As part of this strategy, the KGB and KhAD deployed hundreds of young girls of Central Asian, and Russian origin to corrupt Pakistani society. This influx initially targeted the major urban centers such as Islamabad, Lahore, Karachi, Faisalabad, Multan, and Quetta. These groups of prostitutes strategically selected affluent areas in these cities and operated within a well-organized structure. Many of these prostitutes had connections to KGB and KhAD agents, with high-ranking government officials and Pakistan army officers being their primary targets.

On 28 June 1985, two Afghan Mil Mi-24 helicopters with five crewmen defected to Pakistan, landing at Miramshah, the aircraft belonged to the 377th Independent Helicopter Regiment, piloted by Mohammad Ishak and Mohammad Omar. The helicopters were later transferred to the United States for evaluation, they were later returned and one of them is now at display in Khalid Aviation Base Quetta (Pakistan).

On 19 August 1985, 4 Afghan aircraft bombed the village of Kewas inside Pakistan, killing eight and wounding twelve, and five houses were also destroyed.

Around 1985, Pakistani police in the city of Karachi were becoming alarmed by an increased number of killings. While the murders took place in different areas of the city, an investigation found these murders were done in the same manner; a single blow to the head with a hathora (the word for "hammer" in Urdu). Some Pakistanis newspapers alluded that the Hathora group was actually made up of members of the Soviet intelligence agency, the KGB, and KHAD, who were striking back due to the Pakistani government backing the Afghan mujahideen against the Democratic Republic of Afghanistan.

In late 1985, Pakistani government sent 3,000 Frontier Corps personnel to capture Wali Khan Kukikhel, leader of a faction from the Afridi clan believed to be working with the DRA and to subdue the Afridi and Shinwari tribesmen under his influence and dismantle their smuggling networks.

50 people were killed and 150 were injured in Pakistan in 1986, in a Soviet-Afghan cross border sabotage campaign across the border.

=== 1986 ===
On 7 January, a roadside landmine planted by KHAD killed 15 Afghan refugees in Kurram Agency. On 23 January, KHAD targeted the PIA building in Peshawar with a bomb blast, killing five and injuring 25 Pakistanis. On 28 January, 4 Afghan Mi-24 helicopters violated Pakistani airspace and bombed Parachinar, killing one person and injuring 13. On 31 January 2 Afghan helicopters violated Pakistani airspace 3 times near Parachinar, dropping bombs which injured 3 women.

On 2 February, KHAD saboteurs disrupted the electric supply in Mardan by bombing an electrical grid station. The No. 15 squadron intercepted a couple of Soviet Mig-21s in February 1986 but were ordered not to engage them.

On 15 March, 16 Afghan refugees and three Pakistanis were killed and 11 Afghan refugees were wounded in a KHAD landmine blast in Parachinar. On 22 March, five Afghan refugees were killed and 19 were wounded in an Afghan Army artillery strike on Mata Sangar refugee camp in Kurram Agency. On 27 March, three Afghan refugees and one Pakistani were killed and 17 Pakistanis were wounded in a bomb blast targeting a restaurant in Peshawar, by KHAD.

In the area of operations of the 15th Spetsnaz Brigade, commanded by Lieutenant Colonel Babushkin, repeated mujahideen attacks inflicted heavy losses on Spetsnaz troops. The Mujahideen, using Krer as a supply base, conducted major attacks including the destruction of an entire company in February 1985, leaving only two survivors and an ambush on a ~50 man recon team in August 1985. However, all combat within five miles of the Pakistan-Afghanistan border was prohibited to avoid an international incident. During a mission, the spetsnaz captured an Afghan mujahid who provided Intel about the Krer camp and the spetsnaz fomented a plan to destroy it. Krer camp was situated along the route to Bajaur, a major mujahideen supply hub in Pakistan. It was garrisoned by Asma bin Zaid's regiment of the Abdul Rab Rasul Sayyaf faction with a strength of 400 personnel and commanded by Commander Asadullah. Although usually understaffed, it was heavily equipped with small arms and heavy weaponry. The Soviet order of battle included the 15th Spetsnaz Brigade's 334th and 154th battalions with direct support from the 66th Motorized Rifle Brigade and figments of the DRA Army, Sarandoy and KhAD. Their main mission was to intercept the supplies from Pakistan. Firstly, a recon raid was conducted against Krer's defenses. Two reconnaissance companies of the 334th Battalion were dispatched. After climbing the canyon, they saw two forward positions. A simultaneous assault was planned and the force was divided into 2 assault and one support group, but due to terrain, the plan was changed. Firstly, one group attacked and overran the accessible position, following which the other position's defenders arose to observe and were also overrun. Mujahideen Maps and plans were recovered, weapons were seized and destroyed. The attack force then withdrew with fire support from the support contingent. The main attack was planned using this information with the date being set for 30 March 1986 with the 334th advancing from Asadabad using APCs, crossing the river and climbing via the same route as the recon force under cover from the APCs. The 154th Battalion using its own APCs advanced from Jalalabad accompanied by artillery with only the personnel crossing the river linking with the first force on Spina ridge in the morning, destroying the camp and withdrawing at night. However, due to a hepatitis outbreak, the 154th could only supply ~150 personnel for the mission. On the day of the offensive in the afternoon, Commander Asadullah observed a column of Soviet/DRA forces heading to attack. Heavy fighting broke out following the offloading of troops by the APCs and night fell. The 334th got lost in the darkness and climbed the wrong ridge, while the main ridge was heavily attacked by mujahideen. The Spetsnaz were able to flank and take mujahideen positions out using grenades but both sides suffered high losses. The 334th also engaged with a 16-man mujahideen group, not part of the Krer regiment, returning from Pakistan to Pech valley. They were warned of the Soviet presence by a ferry operator while attempting to cross the river, and they decided to return to Pakistan, forming a defensive perimeter for the night. At 10 PM, they observed Spetsnaz soldiers and initiated fire with Spetsnaz returning fire. Mujahideen withdrew 300m up the hill and struck their old position with Spetsnaz in it and systematically continued repeating this strategy inflicting losses. The 154th meanwhile arrived at the riverbank on 30 March in the morning, crossing the river in 4 hours. By nightfall, they started climbing up the mountains but the DRA forces faced difficulty in doing so, due to a lack of fitness and insubordination but were forced to climb under the threat of abandonment. The 154th reached Spina ridge by the morning, undetected. The planning of 154th's company and brigade commanders was interrupted by Azan of Fajr, following which its 3rd company attacked a mujahideen forward assault position and the rest of the battalion moved down the crest seizing many more positions and raining fire on mujahideen down the crest. The 1st company detonated approaches from Pakistan, infiltrated Pakistani territory and dug 700m inside Pakistan with the area being under full spetsnaz control. The 16-man group which had engaged the 334th was still conducting a systematic retreat into Pakistan, observed the signal rockets of the 154th and immediately retreated into Pakistani territory. After sunrise, ~40 mujahideen attacked the 1st company's positions inside Pakistan but were repelled, resulting in 15 dead. Around 40 minutes later, a mujahideen relief force, traveling on several trucks from Bajaur, charged at the 1st company's positions after being informed of the situation by Commander Asadullah. The Spetsnaz called for artillery strikes which slowed down but could not halt the mujahideen advance. Ultimately, the spetsnaz called artillery strikes on their own positions, inflicting casualties on mujahideen while being battered themselves. The surviving spetsnaz withdrew and the mujahideen occupied the heights, now firing directly at the 154th battalion's command post. By 10:45, the 1st and 2nd companies were rendered combat ineffective and the 3rd was under high stress. The 334th battalion was at a lower position and was faced with a large Mujahideen assault, prompting the brigade commander to call in a medevac helicopter, making his covert unauthorized operation known to the high command. The helicopter, however, was unable to land due to heavy combat. The 1st Company had been completely overrun by a few mujahideen and the main mujahideen force had infiltrated into Krer, occupying heights and raining fire on Spetsnaz. Commander Asadullah's six-personnel team killed the Soviet officer in the 1st company's command center. Ultimately, Soviet gunship helicopters arrived at the scene, being guided by wounded troops inside an adobe, who were besieged by mujahideen forces. Targets were given but the gunships did not fire as the Battle was on Pakistani soil. After about half an hour, a gunship agreed to strike. The building's roof was cleared by the gunships and the few surviving spetsnaz were able to evacuate. Two companies of the 334th carried the dead and wounded of the 154th. The nearest helicopter landing site was at Hill 1917, 10 km away, controlled by the mujahideen. The Spetsnaz company pushed forward as artillery and air strikes continued. On 1 April, the 66th Motorized Rifle Brigade's personnel landed via helicopters and, along with the 154th battalion, found MIAs, KIAs and WIAs, but two Spetsnaz were left behind. Two patrol parties of the 334th entered Pakistan and briefly captured an abandoned post. The two Spetsnaz who were left behind hid in a cave and were killed by mujahideen after a prolonged fight. The Pakistan Army Special Service Group was alleged to be involved in the battle, but the Russians dismissed the claim.

On 2 April 1986, an incident took place during the Second Battle of Zhawar when, instead of Zhawar, the 38th Commando Brigade of the Democratic Republic of Afghanistan arrived near Miram Shah in Pakistan with a force of 120 soldiers and eight helicopters. After arrival, the commandos did not observe any signs of combat amidst the darkness of the night. Thinking the force had lost its way, they asked the command post for signals in the form of flares. At 3 A.M, Afghan artillery fired a flare on Dawri Gar, which the assault group commander reported to be about 15 kilometers from their location. A second flare was launched five kilometers south and the distance was reported to be ten kilometers. Command post relayed that the air assault group had accidentally crossed the border and landed near Miranshah, 5 kilometers inside Pakistan and immediate withdrawal preparations were initiated. Following the failure of the air assault, the Soviet Air Forces bombed Mujahideen positions, following which the Mujahideen attacked the landing sites. A single group of Afghan commandos held out for three days facing constant mujahideen assaults, but was finally overrun. All six Mi-8 helicopters and all 120 commandos were surrounded and captured. Following this, hundreds of Pakistani SSG personnel were deployed to Zhawar, army officers were dispatched to Zhawar and attempted to take down Afghan and Soviet aircraft using English blowpipes but were not successful in doing so; a Pakistani officer and an NCO were injured as a result of Soviet airstrikes. Pakistani forces fired a total of 14 surface-to-air missiles on Soviet aircraft.

On 16 April, DRAAF bombed Saidgi, killing four Pakistani civilians and wounding eight others. On 20 April, a Pakistani was injured in a terrorist attack on the British Airways office in Peshawar. In late April 1986, four people were killed and 14 were wounded in a bomb explosion in the Landi Kotal bazaar, in Khyber Pakhtunkhwa. Pakistan blamed the Afghan secret police for planting the bomb.

On 3 May, Afghan artillery strikes in Kurram Agency, killed three Afghan refugees and 11 Pakistanis while 22 Pakistanis were injured. On 5 May, DRAAF struck Parachinar killing 12 Pakistanis and wounding 14, followed by more airstrikes in Kurram Agency, killing two Afghan refugees and one Pakistani, while three Afghan refugees were wounded. On 6 May, DRAAF struck a tribal paramilitary post in Teri Mangal. On 8 May, nine Afghan refugees were killed in a DRAAF strike on refugee camps in Kurram Agency. On 9 May, DRAAF destroyed a Kotri militia post in Kurram Agency. On 13 May, 13 Afghan refugees and one Pakistani were killed while 22 Afghan refugees and eight Pakistanis were injured in cross-border artillery strikes by Afghan forces in Kurram Agency. On 14 May, DRAAF hit militia posiitions in Kurram Agency and wounded 20 Afghan refugees.

On 17 May 1986, PAF with 2F-16s intercepted one Afghan Su-22M3K which had violated Pakistani airspace near Parachinar. Squadron Leader Hameed Qadri shot down one Su-22 as it was retreating towards the Afghan border by firing AIM-9L missiles within the range of six miles. In a PAF account, he shot down another Su-22 while it was retreating towards the Afghan border, after the execution of a high yo-yo maneuver for gaining the offensive position and fired a three-second burst which resulted in the interception of the second Su-22, although the Afghan government accepted the loss of one aircraft only. Qadri confronted Mig fighters one month later but no engagements were made. New York Times, however reported that one Mig-21 was destroyed and another aircraft was damaged while two others managed to flee back to Afghanistan.

On 19 May, Afghan army artillery fire killed four Pakistanis and injured two in Kurram Agency. On 21 May, multiple militia positions in Kurram were attacked by DRAAF. On 26 May, Pakistan claimed that Afghanistan shelled 4 posts by 80-100 bombs in the Mohmand area, near the place where the Mig 21 was shot down. The posts were damaged but no casualties were inflicted on Pakistani forces. On 27 May, the main post office in Parachinar was targeted in a bomb blast by KHAD.

On 4 June, five Afghan refugees were killed and two were injured in a roadside landmine blast by KHAD. On 5 June, DRAAF struck a refugee camp in Parachinar, killing five Afghan refugees while one Pakistani and five Afghan refugees were injured in the airstrike. On 7 June, three Pakistanis and two Afghan refugees were killed while 40 Pakistanis were injured in a bomb blast by KHAD, targeting a market in Peshawar. On 17 June, power supply to Quetta was damaged as Karik power station was hit by Afghan artillery strikes. On 22 June, a police station in Peshawar was targeted by KHAD in a bomb blast and 21 Pakistanis were injured.

On 11 July, an Afghan refugee hotel in Teri Mangal was bombed by KHAD, killing 10 refugees and wounding five while eight more were killed and 12 were injured in a bombing near an Afghan refugee camp in Kurram. On 25 July, Afghan artillery strikes in Chaman killed seven Pakistanis while a DRAAF strike in Domandai, killed 16 refugees, the next day. On 27 July, another KHAD landmine blast in Kurram Agency, killed six Afghan refugees and wounded six more.

On 16 August, the office of the supervisory medical officer for Kurram Agency was bombed by KHAD. On 26 August DRAAF strikes on refugee camps in Domandai killed 16 Afghan refugees.

On 13 September, three UNHCR ambulances were destroyed in a KHAD bomb blast. On 16 September, militia posts in Shadal were hit by DRAAF, killing six Afghan refugees and injuring 10. On 19 September, Afghan artillery strikes killed two Pakistanis and wounded 12 in Chaman. On 22 September, KHAD killed one Pakistani and wounded nine in a bomb blast in Hangu. On 30 September, a major blast occurred in Peshawar.

On 16 October, a hospital in Peshawar was bombed by KHAD wounding 15 Pakistanis, followed two days later by a bomb blast on a train in Peshawar wounding two.

On 23 October 1986, an Afghan Mig 21, piloted by Lt. Mohammed Daoud defected to Pakistan, landing at Kohat Air Base.

On 25 October, Afghan artillery strikes in Bajaur Agency killed one Pakistani and wounded another. On 28 October, a bombing on a bazar by KHAD killed six Pakistanis and wounded 20 in Peshawar.

On 1 November, a KHAD bombing on a bus killed five Pakistanis and wounded 13.

In December 1986, KhAD attempted a car bombing on the US Consulate in Peshawar, which ended up killing over 30 people as the bomb was being dragged away by police.

=== 1987 ===
On 27 February, Afghanistan bombed the villages of Saigai and Ghulam Mohammad with eight aircraft, destroying 150 shops, killing 35 people and leaving more than 200 wounded.

On 3 March, Afghan jets bombed refugee camps at the Afghanistan-Pakistan border, killing 2 people. On 23 March 1987, an Afghan raid at Tari Mangal aimed at destroying gun shops selling arms to the Mujahideen, killed 80 people.

On 31 March, an Afghan Antonov An-26 was shot down near Parachinar by a Pakistani F-16 using air to air missiles, killing all 39 personnel on board.

On 16 April 1987, Squadron Leader Badar Islam from the Tail Choppers Squadron shot down an Afghan Su-22 with an AIM-9L Sidewinder, with its pilot Lt. Col. Abdul Jameel ejecting and being captured by Pakistani forces.

On 1 May, the Afghan government claimed to have shot down one Pakistani F-16 near Khost after warning fire; Pakistan accepted the loss of the aircraft, attributing it to friendly fire. On 3 May, Pakistan claimed that 7 Afghan aircraft bombed Arandu, wounding five people. On 4 May, Afghan aircraft conducted a targeted strike on Ghulam Khan Killi, who was killed along with two children, and four were injured.

In mid-June, the US Agency for International Development office in Quetta was unsuccessfully targeted by a briefcase bomb.

On 13 July, the US Consulate in Peshawar was slightly damaged in a bomb blast. On 14 July, two vehicles loaded with RDX drove into the Bohri Bazar in Karachi and parked. The cars detonated at intervals of 30 minutes from one another. The 1987 Karachi car bombing resulted in 67 people being killed and left 300 injured.

On 4 August 1987, Squadron Leader Athar Bukhari from the No. 14 Squadron shot down a Soviet Su-25 near Miranshah, piloted by the Soviet pilot, Colonel Alexander Rutskoy. Rutskoy was ejected safely, but was captured by local people and was briefly held as a POW in Islamabad. The U.S. Central Intelligence Agency intervened to save him to avoid interfering with the Geneva Accords and the Soviet withdrawal from Afghanistan. He was later handed back to the Soviets on 16 August 1988; this was his third time being downed as he had managed to eject and escape the earlier two times.

On 3 October 1987, two Afghan Mil Mi-4 helicopters defected to Pakistan, landing in Chitral. Although the helicopters were returned to Afghanistan, the crews were granted political asylum.

According to a report by the US Defense Department, approximately 90% of the estimated 777 acts of international terrorism committed worldwide in 1987 took place in Pakistan.

=== 1988 ===
Pakistan Army Special Service Group reportedly engaged in armed battles with the Soviet paratroopers during Operation Magistral, although the reports remained unconfirmed. When the Battle for Hill 3234 concluded on 8 January 1988, the Soviet paratroopers found that the Afghan mujahideen actually wore the black uniforms with rectangular black-yellow-red stripes, and suspected to be Army Special Service Group personnel; Pakistan's government officially denied their involvement. The American author, Aukai Collins, identified the elements as "Black Storks" who crossed the border to join the Afghan mujahideen–a claim also backed by American author, David Campbell.

On 27 February, the Afghan Air Force struck Matasanga and Khardand camps, 180 miles west of Islamabad, killing 31 and injuring 49 more.

The Ojhri Camp disaster on 8 April 1988, caused by the explosion of an ammunition depot, resulted in the death of 93 people. Zia-ul-Haq dissolved the parliament after the incident. The United States alleged that the Soviet Union and the Democratic Republic of Afghanistan were involved in the incident.

In early September 1988, DRAAF/Soviets conducted three airstrikes on Pakistani villages killing five and inwounding 17.

On 7 September, PAF shot down an Afghan Mig 25 which had conducted a bombing raid, killing one and injuring two people.

On 12 September 1988, Flight Lieutenant Khalid shot down two Mig-23. On 3 November 1988, Flight Lieutenant Khalid Mehmood shot down an Afghan Su-22.

On 26 September 1988, Major V. Astakhov from the 120th Guards Fighter Aviation Regiment downed a Pakistani helicopter during an engagement as it was intruding into Afghan airspace.

On 3 November, Khalid Mahmood shot down an Afghan Su-22 by firing two AIM-9L missiles.

On 7 November, an Afghan aircraft bombed a refugee camp inside Pakistan, killing two people in Kotri village.

On 19 November, Pakistan shot down an Afghan cargo plane that had lost direction and flown to Jalalabad. Thirty people were killed on board.

Between May 1986 and November 1988, the PAF's newly acquired F-16s had shot down at least eight intruding aircraft from Afghanistan. The first three of these (one Su-22, one probable Su-22, and one An-26) were shot down by two pilots from No. 9 Squadron. Pilots of No. 14 Squadron destroyed the remaining five intruders (two Su-22s, two MiG-23s, and one Su-25). Most of these kills were by the AIM-9 Sidewinder, but at least one (a Su-22) was destroyed by cannon fire. Pakistani Flight Lieutenant Khalid Mahmoud is credited with three of these kills.

By 1988, KGB and KhAD agents were able to penetrate deep inside Pakistan and carry out attacks on mujahideen sanctuaries and guerrilla bases.

== Disinformation ==
The Soviet invasion of Afghanistan faced criticism from the global community, for which the KGB launched Operation Torkham to neutralise the negative view of the Soviets and to distract attention from the war in Afghanistan, which involved disinformation. Vasiliy Mitrokhin stated that Yuri Andropov, the chairman of the KGB approved a plan which included information warfare against the Pakistani military and its involvement in Afghanistan, impeding relations between India and Pakistan. According to a KGB resident in Delhi, Soviets saw conflict between India and Pakistan as beneficial as it could lead to decreased Pakistani support for the Mujahideen, therefore weakening Afghanistan's defenses. Through the UN, the message was to be conveyed to the Iranian representatives that Pakistan was willing to grant the United States bases in Baluchistan, which was close to Iran. The Chukhrov working group proposed plans to create an independent Azad Kashmir separate from India and Pakistan and to set up a government in exile for Balochistan; however, the plan was postponed due to complexities.
