= Kazim Hammad =

Pakistani military officer

Air Marshal Kazim Hammad HI(M) SI(M) TI(M)
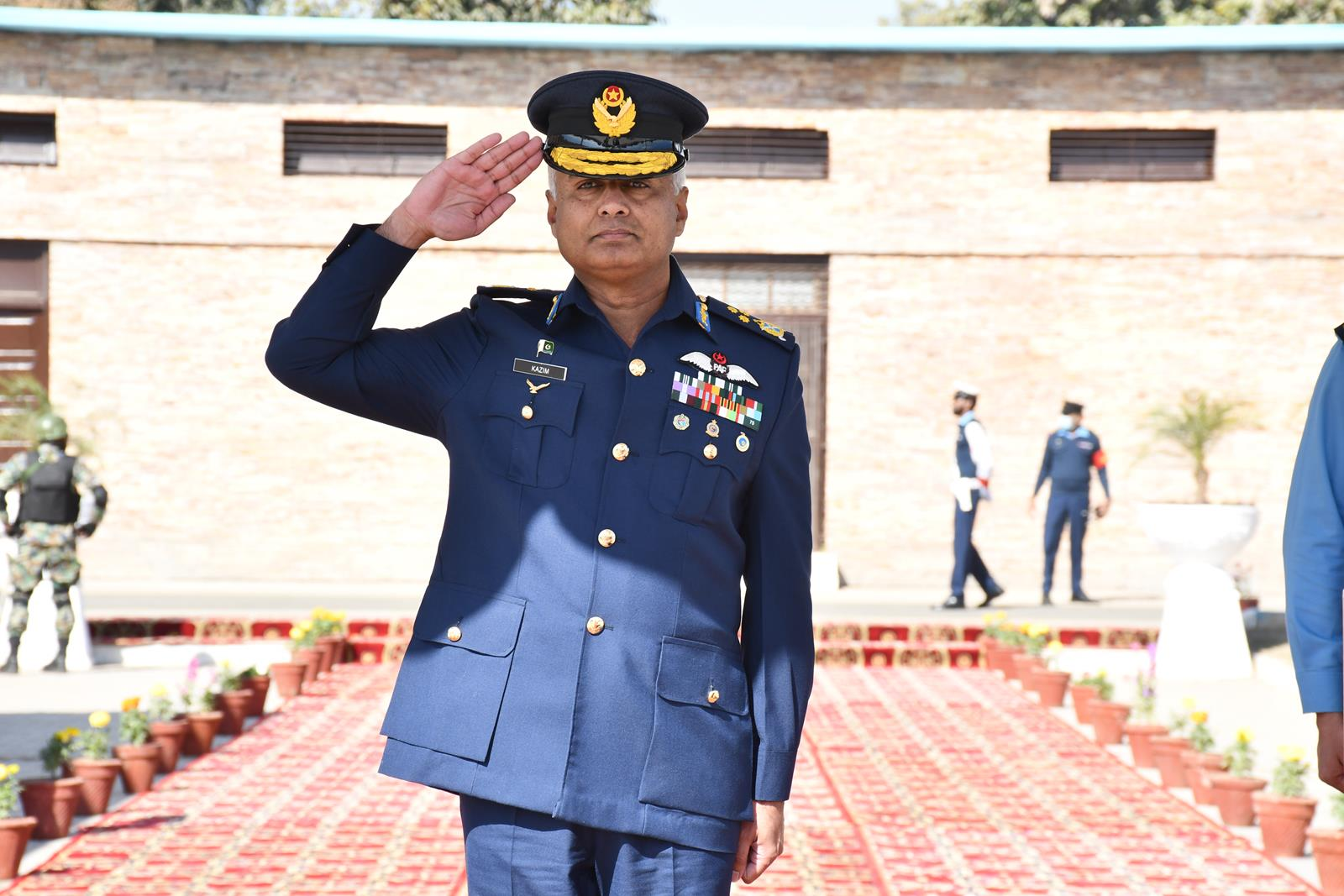
- Education: Pakistan Air Force Academy
- Military career
- Allegiance: Pakistan
- Branch: Pakistan Air Force
- Service years: c. 1980s — present
- Rank: Air Marshal
- Service number: Pak/10198
- Commands: Flight Commander 26 Squadron; Officer Commanding Flying Instructors School; Officer Commanding 17 Squadron; Air Attaché Pakistani High Commission New Delhi, India; Base Commander PAF Base MM Alam; Air Officer Commanding Federal Air Command; Additional Secretary of Defence Division; Director General Air Intelligence; Deputy Chief of Air Staff Administration (DCAS-A)
- Conflicts: Indo-Pakistani Conflicts; 2001 India-Pakistan standoff; 2008 Indo-Pakistan standoff; India–Pakistan border skirmishes (2019); 2025 India-Pakistan standoff; Operation Swift Retort; War on terror; Insurgency in Khyber Pakhtunkhwa
- Awards: Hilal-e-Imtiaz (Military) Sitara-e-Imtiaz (Military) Tamgha-e-Imtiaz (Military)

Kazim Hammad HI(M), SI(M), TI(M) is an air marshal of the Pakistan Air Force, who is the incumbent Deputy Chief of the Air Staff (Administration) at AHQ, Islamabad.

== Military career ==
Hammad was commissioned in the General Duty Pilot GD (P) branch of the Pakistan Air Force. During his career, Kazim has commanded a fighter squadron, a flying wing, operational air base and a regional air command.

He is a graduate of Combat Commanders' School, Royal Command and Staff College, United Kingdom and National Defence University, Islamabad. Air Marshal Kazim holds a master's degree in War Studies and Defence Management. He has also served as Pakistan's Air Attaché to India. He was promoted to the rank of Air vice-marshal in 2020. In the same year, he was appointed as Additional Secretary of the Defence Division.

As per media reports, in 2023, Hammad was appointed as President of the Pakistan Squash Federation.

Subsequently, he was promoted to the rank of Air Marshal. The Air Marshal has flown a variety of training and fighter aircraft throughout his career in the PAF. He has been awarded Hilal-e-Imtiaz, Sitara-e-Imtiaz and Tamgha-e-Imtiaz by the President of Pakistan throughout his career for his meritorious service towards Government of Pakistan.Awards and decorations

Kazim has been awarded various medals throughout his distinguished career, which includes Hilal-i-Imtiaz, Sitara-i-Imtiaz and Tamgha-e-Imtiaz.

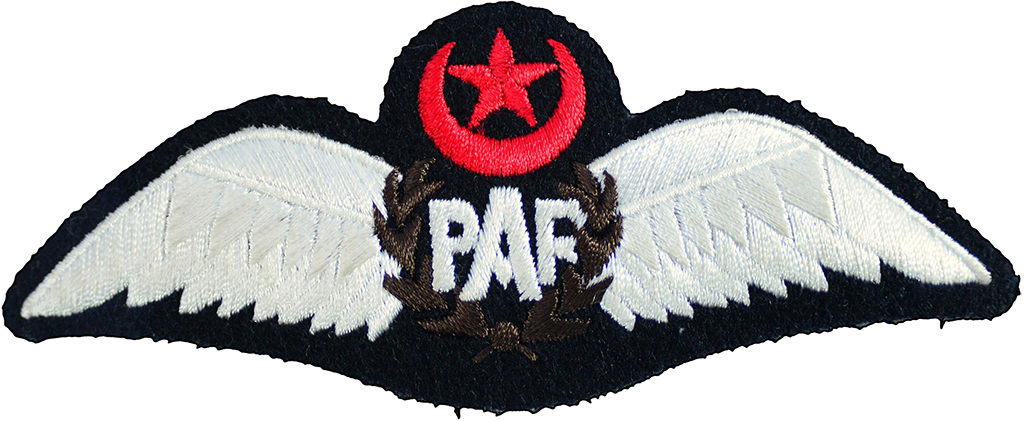

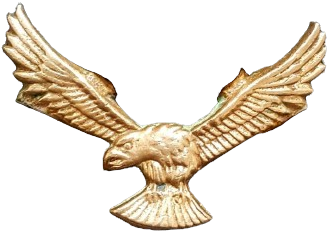

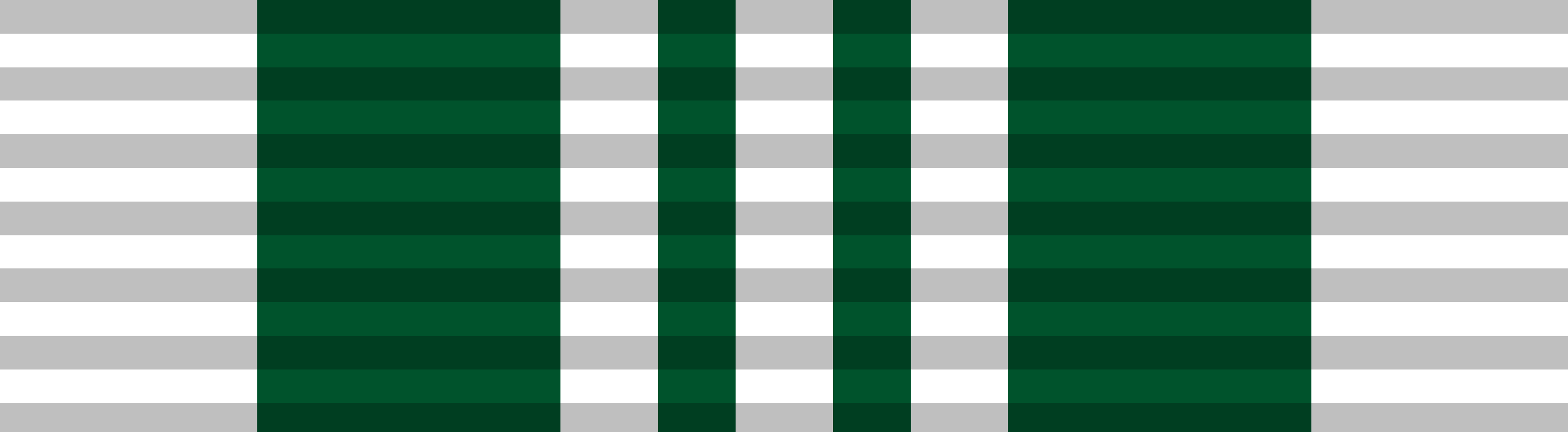

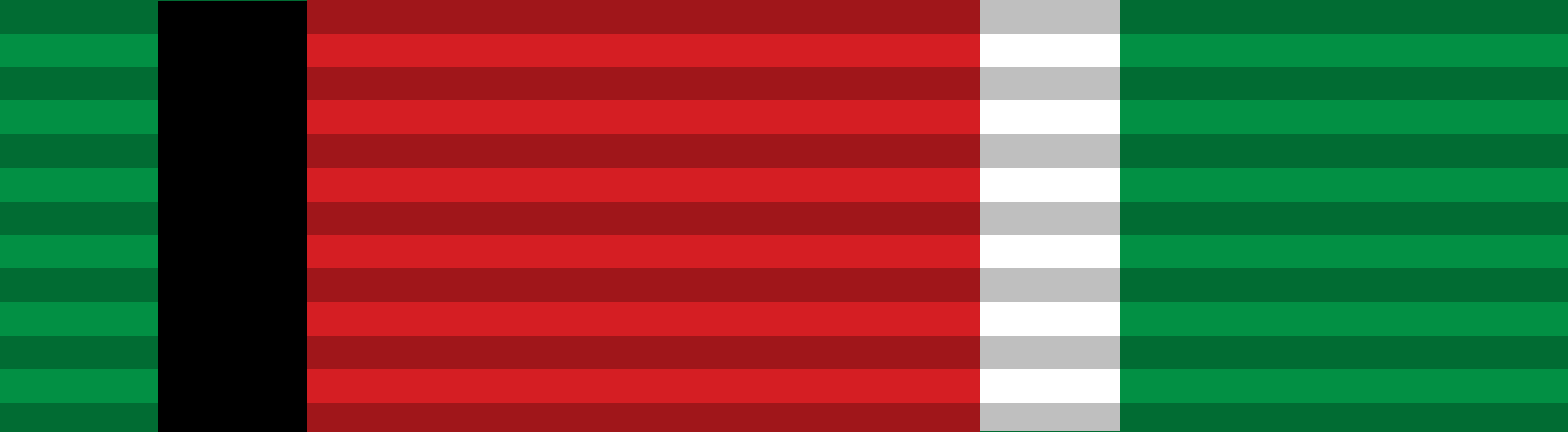

PAF GD(P) Badge RED (More than 4000 Flying Hours)
Golden Eagle Award (Pakistan) (Exceptional Fighter Pilot)			
Hilal-e-Imtiaz (Military) (Crescent of Excellence)			
Sitara-e-Imtiaz (Military) (Star of Excellence)	Tamgha-e-Imtiaz (Military) (Medal of Excellence)	Tamgha-e-Baqa (Nuclear Test Medal)	Tamgha-e-Istaqlal Pakistan (Escalation with India Medal)
Tamgha-e-Azm (Medal of Conviction)	10 Years Service Medal	20 Years Service Medal	30 Years Service Medal
35 Years Service Medal	Jamhuriat Tamgha (Democracy Medal)	Qarardad-e-Pakistan Tamgha (Resolution Day)	Tamgha-e-Salgirah Pakistan (Independence Day Golden Jubilee Medal)
