= Hangu =

Hangu may refer to:

== Places ==
China

- Hangu District, Tianjin, a former district in Tianjin, China
- Hangu Pass, a pass in China

Pakistan

- Hangu, Pakistan, a town in Khyber Pakhtunkhwa Province
- Hangu District, Pakistan, a district in Khyber Pakhtunkhwa Province
- Miranzai Valley, also Hangu, in Khyber Pakhtunkhwa Province

Romania

- Hangu, Neamț, a commune in Neamț County
- Hangu (river), a tributary of the Bistrița in Neamț County

Others

- Hanggu-guyok, a district in North Korea
