= No. 16 Squadron PAF =

No. 16 Squadron Black Panthers
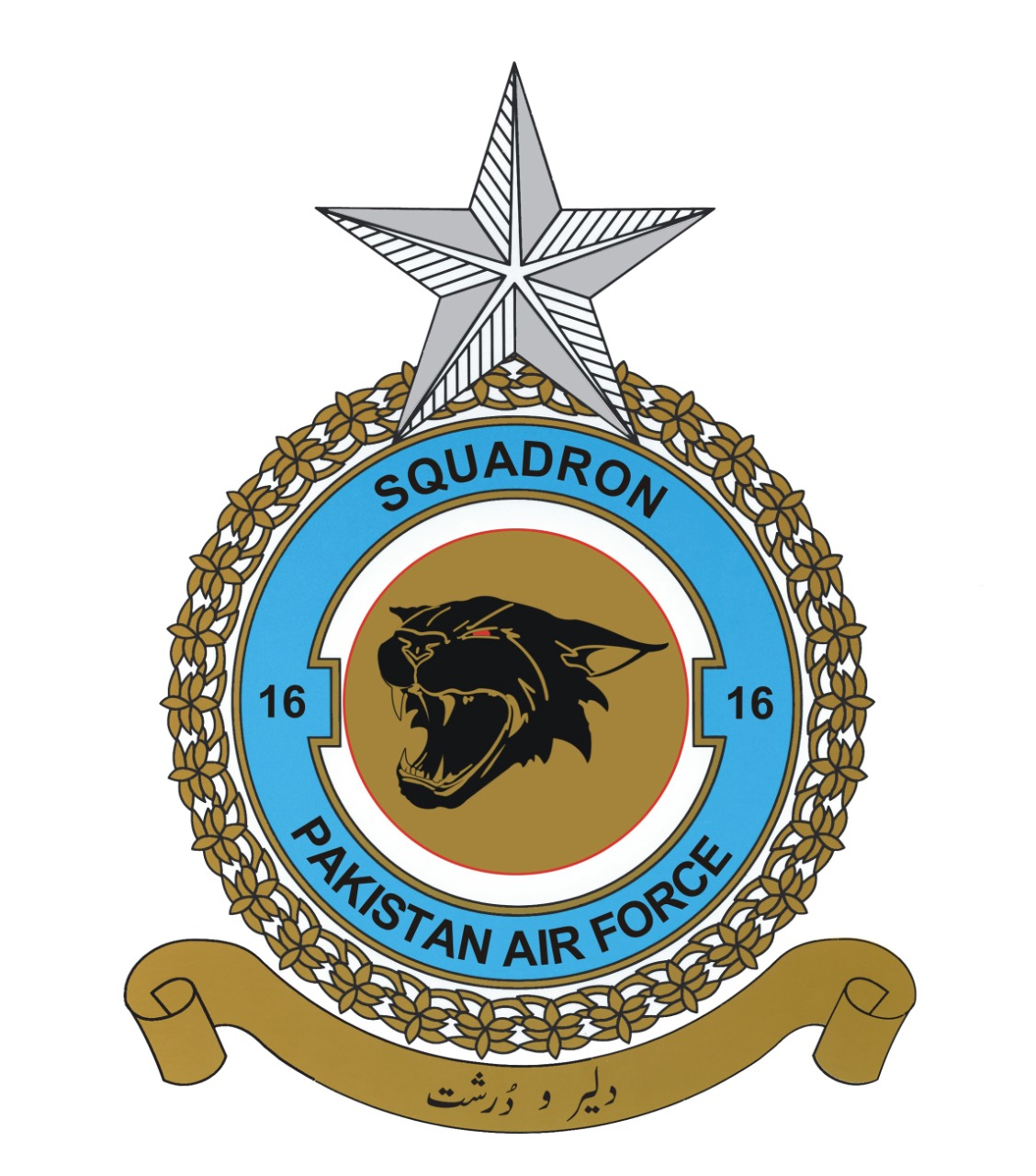
- Crest of the No.16 Squadron of Pakistan Air Force
- Active: 1957 – Present
- Disbanded: 1963-1971
- Country: Pakistan
- Allegiance: Pakistan Armed Forces
- Branch: Pakistan Air Force
- Type: Fighter squadron
- Role: Multi-role
- Part of: Northern Air Command
- Airbase: PAF Base Minhas
- Nickname: Black Panthers
- Mottos: دلیر و درشت (Persian: Brave & Big)
- Mascot: A Black panther
- Aircraft: JF-17 Thunder Block 3
- Engagements: 1971 Indo-Pakistani War; Operation Swift Retort

Insignia
- Talon

- Patch

Aircraft flown
- Attack: Nanchang A-5C (1983–2011)
- Fighter: F-86F Sabre (1957–1972); Shenyang F-6 (1982–1983); JF-17 (2011–2023); JF-17 Block 3 (2023–Present)
- Trainer: JF-17B Thunder

No. 16 Squadron, nicknamed the Black Panthers, is a multi-role squadron of the Pakistan Air Force's Northern Air Command. The squadron is currently based at Minhas Airbase and operates the PAC JF-17 Thunder multi-role jets.

== History ==
The squadron was established in 1957 under the command of Squadron Leader Imam-ul-Haq Khan, equipped with F-86F Sabre fighter aircraft and assigned the role of tactical attack. It was temporarily disbanded in 1963 and reestablished on 13 April 1970 at PAF Base Masroor, flying the F-86F Sabre and commanded by Wing Commander Sharbat Ali Changazi. In February 1971, as the Fighter Leaders School, the unit was assigned to train senior pilots in advanced tactics. Although the squadron was not employed in the Indo-Pakistani War of 1971, its pilots were transferred to PAF Base Peshawar, where they flew with the No. 26 Squadron. Changazi led several strike missions into Indian territory and shot down an Indian Air Force Hawker Hunter. Squadron Leader Cecil Chaudhry, attached to No. 18 Squadron, was shot down by ground fire but ejected safely and later shot down an Indian Sukhoi Su-7.

The squadron was disbanded in October 1972 and reestablished in 1982 at PAF Base Rafiqui, equipped with the Shenyang F-6. It was decided that the Panthers would be the first squadron to be reequipped with the Nanchang A-5C attack fighter, and personnel were sent to China to be trained on it. The first batch of A-5Cs was delivered to PAF Base Rafiqui on 12 February 1983. A reequipment ceremony was held on 21 March 1983, the squadron was assigned the role of tactical attack, and Wing Commander Hamid Saeed Khan was put in command. A Pakistan Day flypast on 23 March 1983 earned the squadron a "Best Fly-Past" award. The Panthers also converted pilots of the No. 7 ("Bandits") and No. 26 ("Black Spiders") squadrons to fly the Nanchang A-5C. In November 1985, the unit began practicing with live 750 lb bombs and extensive Dissimilar Air Combat Training (DACT) with the PAF's F-16 squadrons.

In 1988, more DACT sorties were flown against the Chengdu F-7P. Five A-5Cs were added to the squadron's fleet in May 1989, and in mid-1990 Wing Commander Zafar evaluated the upgraded A-5M and A-5F attack fighters in China. In 1991, three Shenyang FT-6 dual-seat fighters with Martin-Baker ejection seats were inducted for training purposes. In November 1991 the unit was temporarily transferred to Multan and flew 115 sorties from there with 100% serviceability and reliability rates. In 1997 the squadron was again temporarily transferred to PAF Base Minhas and Murid during runway recarpeting at the unit's parent airbase. A deployment to PAF Base Chaklala for Air Defence Alert duties was also carried out. In 1998 an A-5's canopy jettisoned during an Exercise Wide Awake sortie, but the aircraft landed safely.

=== JF-17 Block 3 ===
Some reports on social media indicated that Pakistan's most famous air squadron – 16 Squadron nicknamed ‘Black Panthers ’ had received the first batch of JF-17 Block III aircraft. A defense journalist from Pakistan who wished to remain anonymous told EurAsian Times that about 12 fighters were indeed inducted into service with the 16 Squadron in a very small-scale ceremony. The JF-17 is jointly developed by China and Pakistan.

=== 2019 Jammu & Kashmir Airstrikes ===
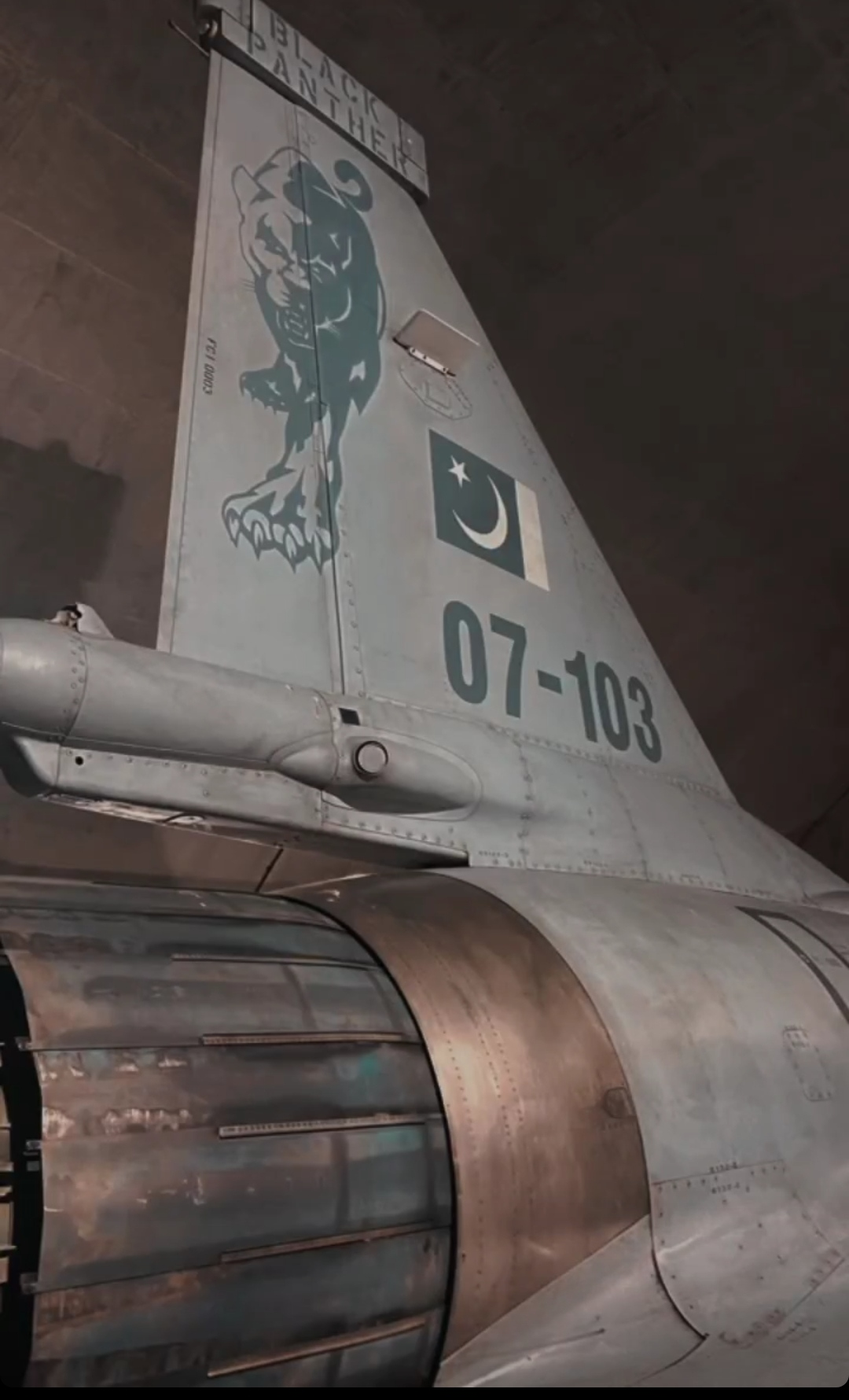
Black Panther JF-17 with Tail Art

In February 2019, 2 JF-17s from the No. 26 Squadron armed with Mark 83 REK bombs participated in the retaliatory airstrikes in Indian Administered Kashmir and dropped their bombs near Indian military installations.

== Aircraft Flown ==
No. 16 Squadron Black Panthers
Role	Operational	Aircraft	Notes
	1957–1963; 1971–1972	F-86F Sabre	
	1982–1983; 1991— ----	Shenyang F-6; Shenyang FT-6	
Tactical Attack	1983–2011	Nanchang A-5C	The PAF's first A-5C squadron.
Multi-role	2023–present	JF-17 Thunder Block 3	The PAF's second JF-17 squadron, A-5C retirement and JF-17 reequipment ceremony held in April 2011.

== Gallery ==
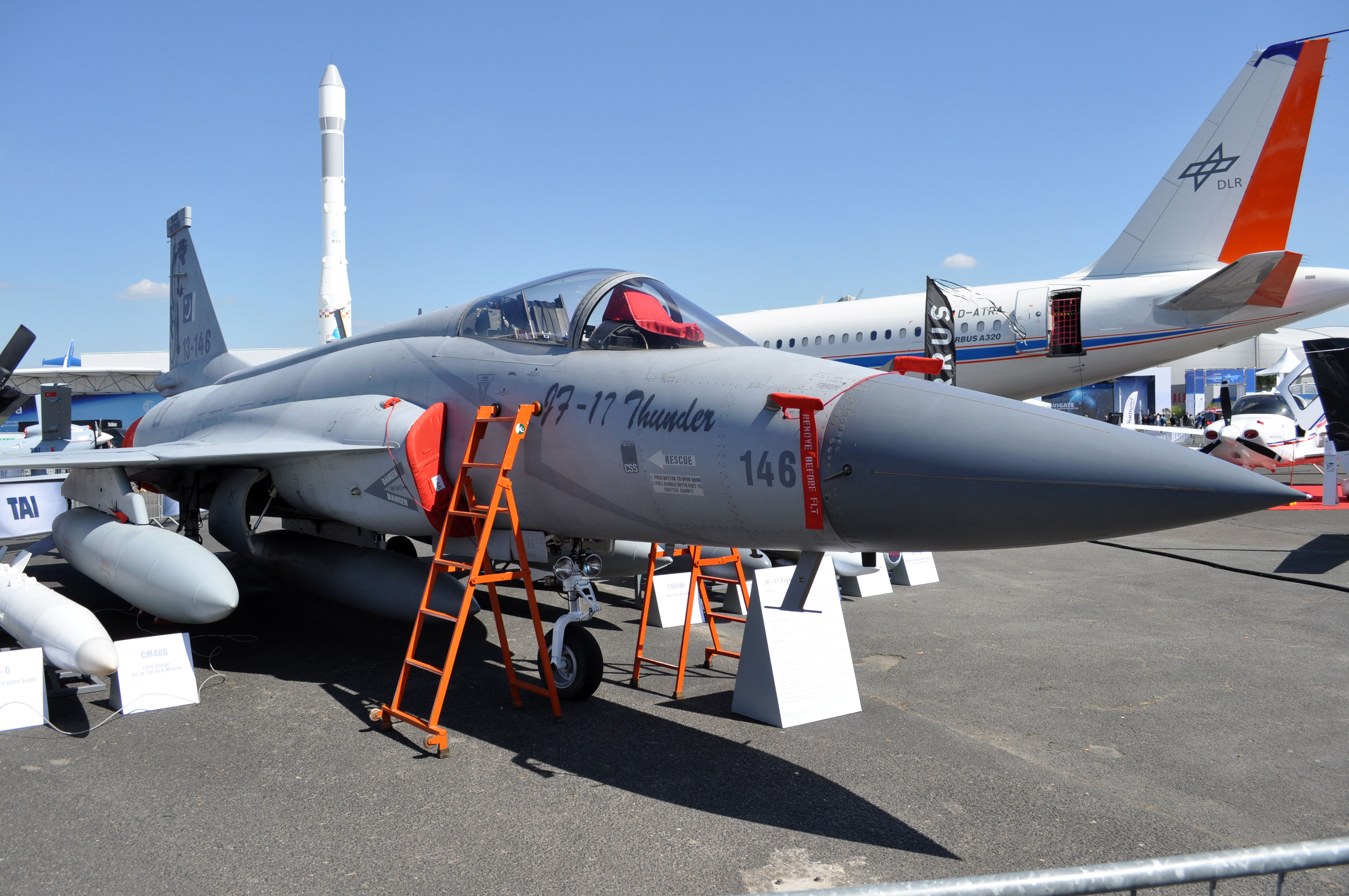
JF-17 Thunder from the No. 16 Squadron on display with the Squadron mascot "Black Panther" painted on its tail

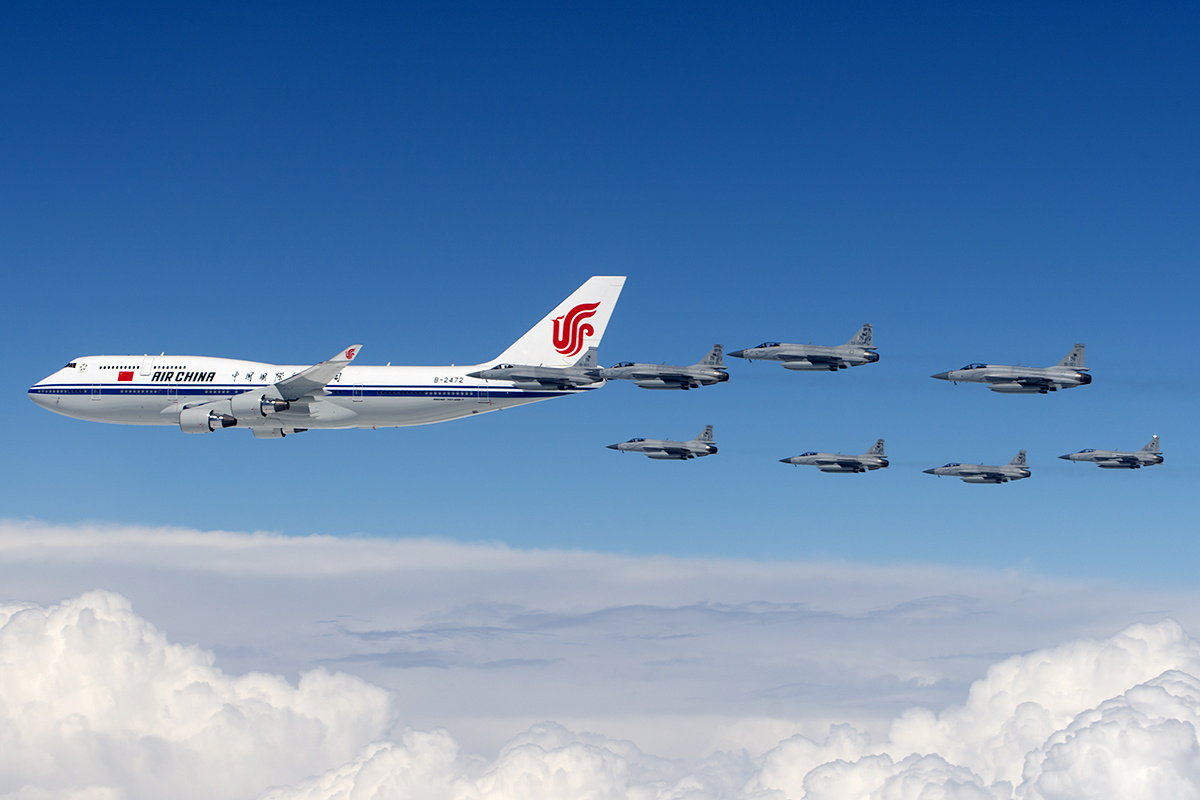
PAC JF-17 Thunders from No.16 and No.26 squadron escorting the Chinese Premier's Boeing 747 during his official visit to Pakistan

== Exercises ==
=== Regular ===
- Exercise Flat Out
  - 1988
  - 1989
  - 1991
  - 1992 ×3
  - 1996 ×3
  - 1998
- Exercise Wide Awake
  - 1988 – ×2
  - 1989 – ×3
  - 1991
  - 1992 – ×4
  - 1996 – ×3
  - 1998
- DACT Camps (Dissimilar Air Combat Training)
  - 1985 – extensive training sorties flown against the F-16.
  - 1988 – 1v1 sorties evaluating F-7P against A-5C.
  - 1992
  - 1993
  - 1998 – ×2, PAF Base Minhas

=== Annual and others ===
- Jetstream 1983
- High Mark 85
- High Mark 86 – offensive sorties flown. Also participated in a live armament exercise at Thal Range.
- Long Shadow 88 – February 1988.
- Shako 88
- High Mark 89 – deployed to PAF Base Farid.
- High Mark 93 – October
- High Mark 95
- Saffron Bandit 95
- Hit Hard-VI – April 88
- Hit Hard-VII – June 88
- Hit Hard-VIII – August 88
- Fake-XIV (1988)
- Hit Hard (1989)
- Tondo-II, Tondo-III, Tondo-IV (1989)
- Combat VI (91)
- Sore Eyes-III (91)
- Condor-II (91)
- King Cobra 92 – 100% mission success rate achieved.
- Fire Fox 97 – March, an Air Defence exercise during which low level sorties were flown to train interceptor pilots.
- Zarb-e-Aahen 98
- Saffron Bandit 98 – PAF Base Sargodha

- Armament exercises
  - December 1988 – Matra Durandal firing, Somniani Range.
  - 1996 – Air-to-air firing, PAF Base Masroor.
- Awards
  - ACES 97 (Air Combat Evaluations) – received ACES Trophy for best performing tactical attack squadron.
  - Inter-Squadron Dive Bombing Competition – No. 16 and 26 squadrons competed, No. 16 won.

== In Popular Media ==
The Squadron was featured in the 2019 Pakistani Film Sherdil in which the protagonist Haris is deployed in the No. 16 Squadron and flies the PAC JF-17 Thunder & his grandfather too who flew North American F-86 Sabres of the No. 16 squadron during the 1965 Conflict with India.

The Squadron livery is also shown in popular videogame War Thunder as the default livery of the JF-17 Thunder Block 1

== See also ==
- List of Pakistan Air Force squadrons
- No.17 Squadron PAF
- No.26 Squadron PAF
