= Hangu, Neamț =

Hangu
- Commune
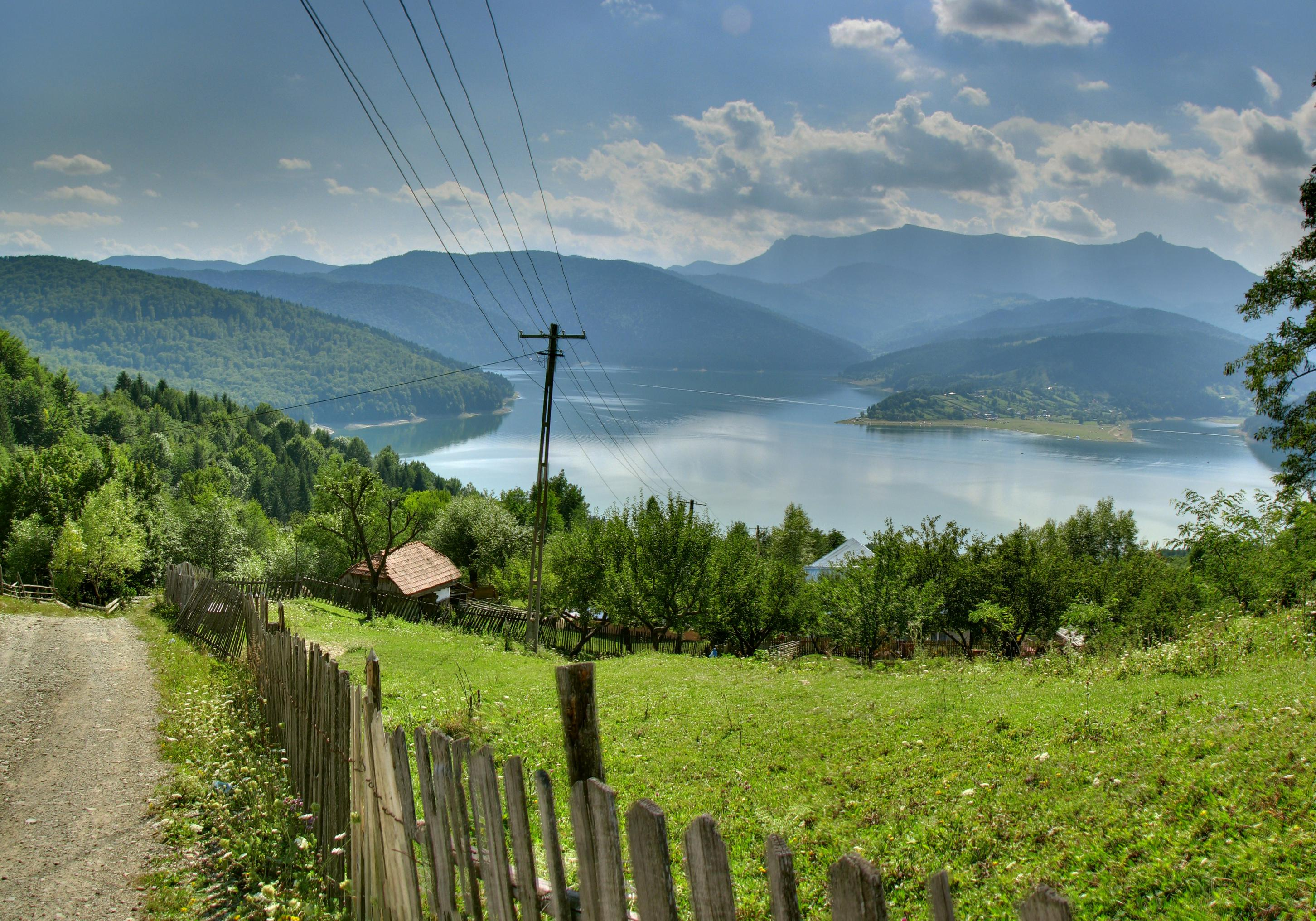
- View of Bicaz Lake from Ruginești

- Location in Neamț County

- Location in Romania
- Coordinates: 47°06′27″N 26°04′11″E
- Country: Romania
- County: Neamț

Government
  - Mayor (2020–2024): Gavril Lupu (PSD)
- Area: 119.34 km^{2} (46.08 sq mi)
- Elevation: 500 m (1,600 ft)
- Population (2021-12-01): 2,987
  - Density: 25.03/km^{2} (64.83/sq mi)
- Time zone: UTC+02:00 (EET)
  - Summer (DST): UTC+03:00 (EEST)
- Postal code: 617240
- Area code: +(40) x33
- Vehicle reg.: NT
- Website: www.comunahangu.ro

Hangu is a commune in Neamț County, Western Moldavia, Romania. Situated in an area of the Lake Izvorul Muntelui also called "Little Switzerland," it is a mixture of modern and archaic culture. It is composed of five villages: Buhalnița, Chirițeni, Grozăvești, Hangu, and Ruginești.

== Geography ==
Hangu is near Lake Izvorul Muntelui (also known as Bicaz Lake), an artificial lake used to generate hydroelectricity. The village is located in the valley of Hangu River and it surrounded by the peaks of Mount Stânișoara: Muntele Hangu westwards, Boboteni village and Muncelu Peak in the north, the Audia village, and the Malu Peak eastwards. In the south, the DN15C road separates the village from the Bicaz Lake and over the lake, the Ceahlău Massif (a popular Romanian tourist site).

== Demographics ==
Historical population
Year	Pop.	±%
1992	4,275	—
2002	4,101	−4.1%
2011	3,619	−11.8%
2021	2,987	−17.5%
Source: Census data

The commune's main village, also called Hangu, has a population of about 1,500 inhabitants. It is situated on the national road DN15C which stretches from Piatra Neamț to Târgu Mureș. The area of the commune is home to many ethnographic treasures which are preserved by local traditions or through the local cultural association which publishes a monthly magazine called Țara Hangului. The main activities are agriculture, forestry, tourism, and car service. It is a typical mountain village, with the main institutions (school, police, local administration, health services, etc.) and a high rate of unemployment (about 20% according to the latest survey of AJOFM (The Job Service) Neamț). As a result, many inhabitants work abroad in Italy, Spain, Greece, or Germany. Except the national road DN15C, all the other internal roads are not suitable for cars with low wheelbase. A running water system is provided by funds from Special Accession Programme for Agriculture and Rural Development (SAPARD), however, further work still needs to be done on the village's infrastructure and environmental protection.

== Natives ==
- Victor Cădere (1891–1980), jurist, administrator, and diplomat
- Dumitru Coroamă (1885–1956), major general
