= No. 26 Squadron PAF =

Pakistani air force unit

No. 26 Squadron Black Spiders
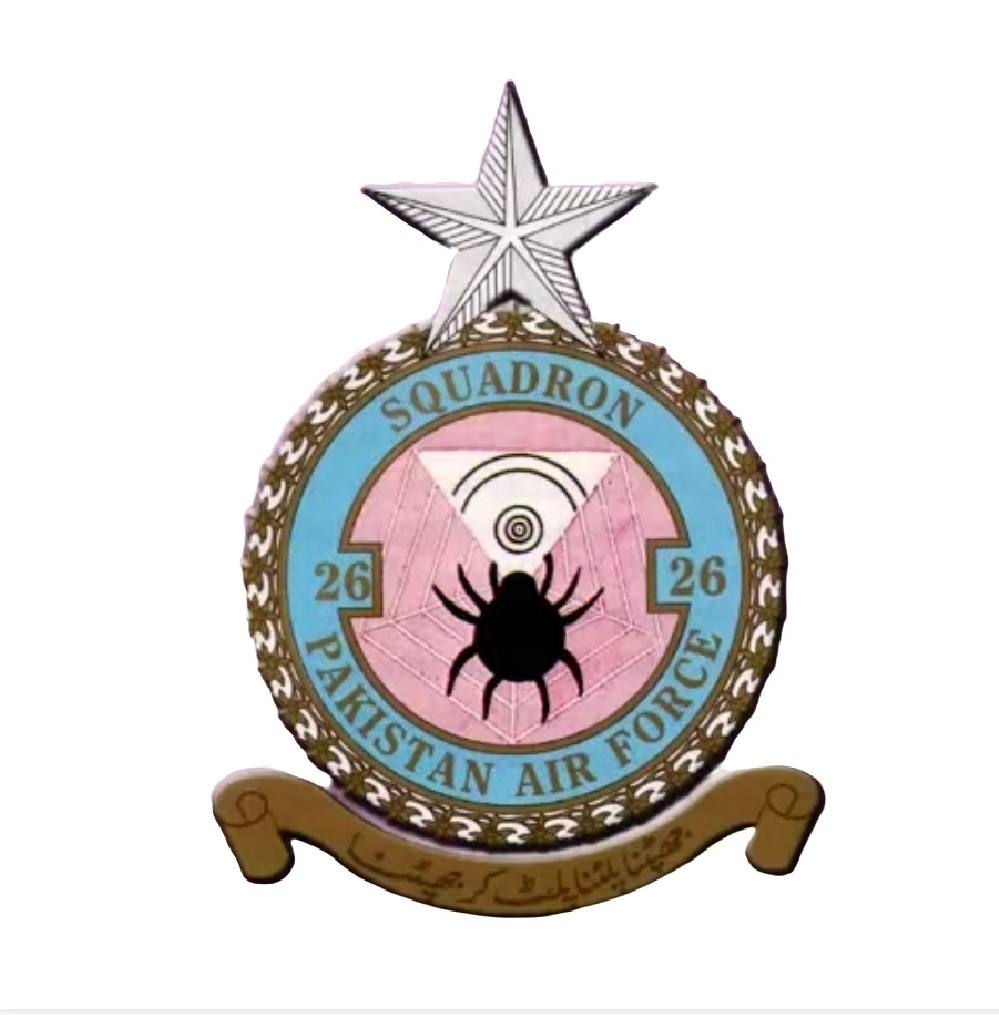
- Active: 30 August 1967 — Present
- Country: Pakistan
- Allegiance: Pakistan Armed Forces
- Branch: Pakistan Air Force
- Type: Fighter squadron
- Role: Multi-role
- Part of: Northern Air Command
- Airbase: PAF Base Peshawar
- Nickname: Black Spiders
- Mottos: جھپٹنا ، پلٹنا ، پلٹ کر جھپٹنا (Urdu for 'To swoop, withdraw and swoop again')
- Mascot: A Black Spider
- Aircraft: PAC JF-17 Thunder
- Engagements: Afghanistan-Pakistan Skirmishes; Pakistan Soviet air confrontations; India-Pakistan Conflict; 1971 Indo-Pakistani War; Battle of Chamb; Battle of Shakargarh; Spillover of Soviet - Afghan war in Pakistan; War on terror; Operation Rah-e-Nijat
- Decorations: 2× Sitara-e-Jurat

Commanders
- Notable commanders: Wing Commander Sharbat Ali Changezi

Insignia
- Identification symbol: Spider Vinyl on the nose (For A-5C)
- Identification symbol: A Black Spider or Spider Web decal on the Tail (For JF-17)
- Patch

Aircraft flown
- Attack: Nanchang A-5C (1984–2010)
- Fighter: F-86 Sabre (1967-1980); Shenyang F-6P Farmer (1980–1984); PAC JF-17 (2010—Present)

The No. 26 Squadron, nicknamed the Black Spiders, is a multi-role squadron of the Pakistan Air Force's Northern Air Command. It is currently based at Peshawar Airbase and operates the PAC JF-17 Thunder multirole fighter jets.

== History ==
=== F-86 Sabre ===
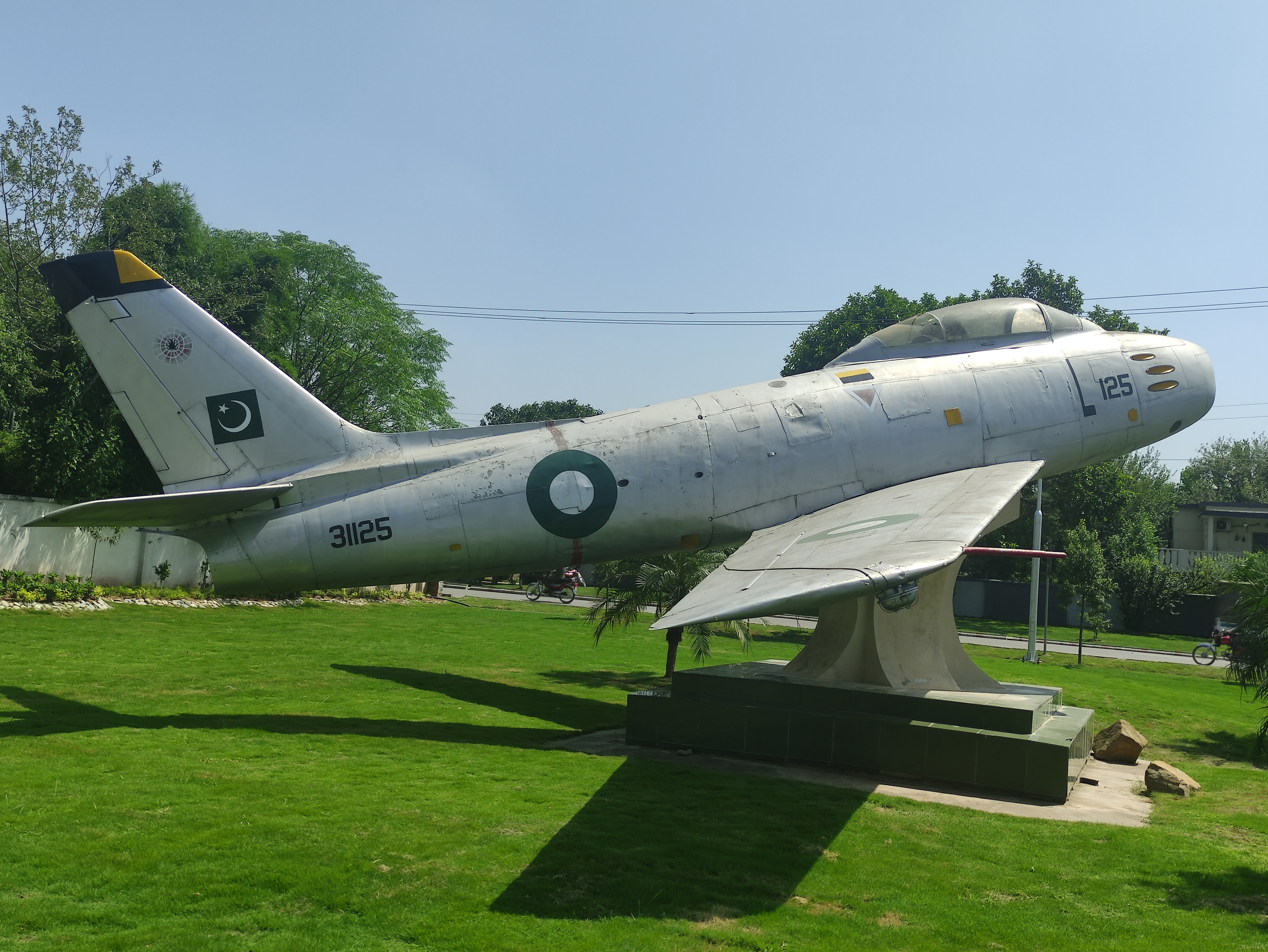
Retired F-86F Sabre of the No. 26 Squadron on display (Black spider logo visible on tail)

The No. 26 Squadron was raised on 30 August 1967 at PAF Base Masroor under the command of Wing Commander Rehmat Khan. Equipped with the F-86 Sabre, the squadron was assigned the role of operational conversion unit and trained pilots on the F-86 Sabre.

The squadron later shifted to PAF Base Peshawar from where it is still currently operating. For the next 10 years, more than 300 Pakistani and 150 foreign pilots were trained.

==== 1971 War ====
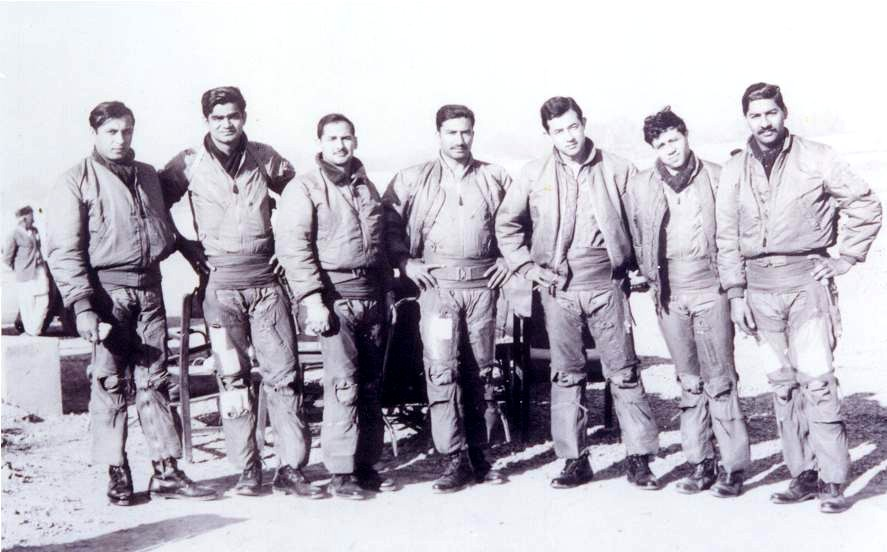
Fighter pilots of the No. 26 Squadron during the 1971 war. From left-to-right, Pervez Mirza, Flt Lt Salim Baig Mirza, unknown, Flt Lt Amjad Enderabi, Flt Lt Rahim Yousufzai, Shafqat and Flt Lt H K Dotani.

During the 1971 Indo-Pakistani War, the Squadron under the command of Wing Commander Sharbat Ali Changezi flew over 300 air defence, counter air strike, and close air support missions. Counter air sorties were often targeted at the Indian Air Force bases in Srinagar and Awantipur. Close air support sorties were flown over Chumb and Shakargarh. At the end of the war, the Squadron had shot down 7 Indian aircraft and damaged 2 more. (Kills by No. 16 Squadron pilots serving with the No. 26 squadron also included).

On 4 December 1971, Wing Commander Changezi shot down a Hawker Hunter over Peshawar. Later that day, during a low altitude dogfight, Flight Lieutenant Khalid Razzak damaged an IAF Hunter while his wingman Flight Lieutenant Salim Baig Mirza shot down another Hunter which were attacking the Peshawar Airport. On 14 December, a formation of four F-86F Sabres consisting of Wing Commander Changezi & Flight Lieutenants H K Dotani, Amjad Andrabi, and Maroof Mir took of from Peshawar Airbase with Flight Lieutenants Salim Baig and Rahim Yusufzai providing escort. They headed towards Indian-controlled Kashmir to execute airstrikes on the IAF base in Srinagar. The formation flew at low level through the Pir Panjal range to avoid detection by Indian observation posts. After reaching the IAF Base, the formation dropped their payload of Mk.84 bombs and cratered the runway preventing any Indian fighters from taking off.

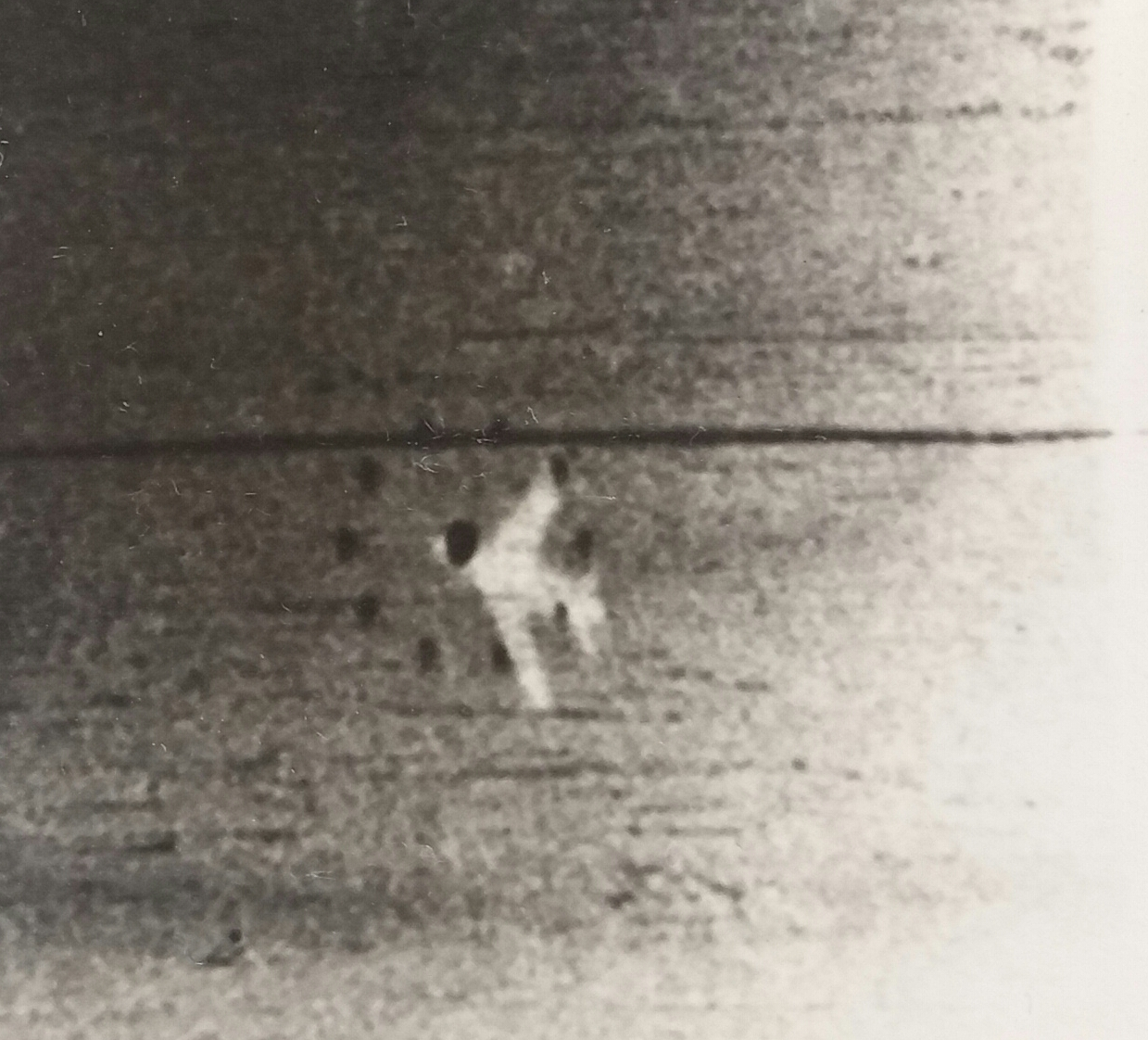
An Indian Gnat in the gunsight of Flight Lieutinant Salim Baig's F-86F Sabre moments before it was shot down

Though two Folland Gnats had managed to take off before the runway was disabled, one of the Gnats strayed away from the area allegedly due to low visibility while the second Gnat (flown by Flying Officer Nirmal Jit Singh) engaged the No. 26 Squadron's formation but was shot down by Flight Lieutenant Salim Baig after an intense high G dogfight. During the war however, the squadron lost two Sabres along with their pilots.

After flying 15 sorties, Squadron Leader M. Aslam Chaudhary's F-86F (S.No. 3856) was shot down on 10 December 1971 during a close air support mission over Chumb when his section of two F-86 were bounced by six Indian Hawker Hunters. Flight Lieutenant Fazal Elahi's F-86F (S.N. 4109) was shot down by ground fire on 8 December 1971 during a close air support sortie over Zafarwal. Both Mirza and Elahi were posthumously awarded the Sitara-i-Juraat for their services.

=== Shenyang F-6C ===
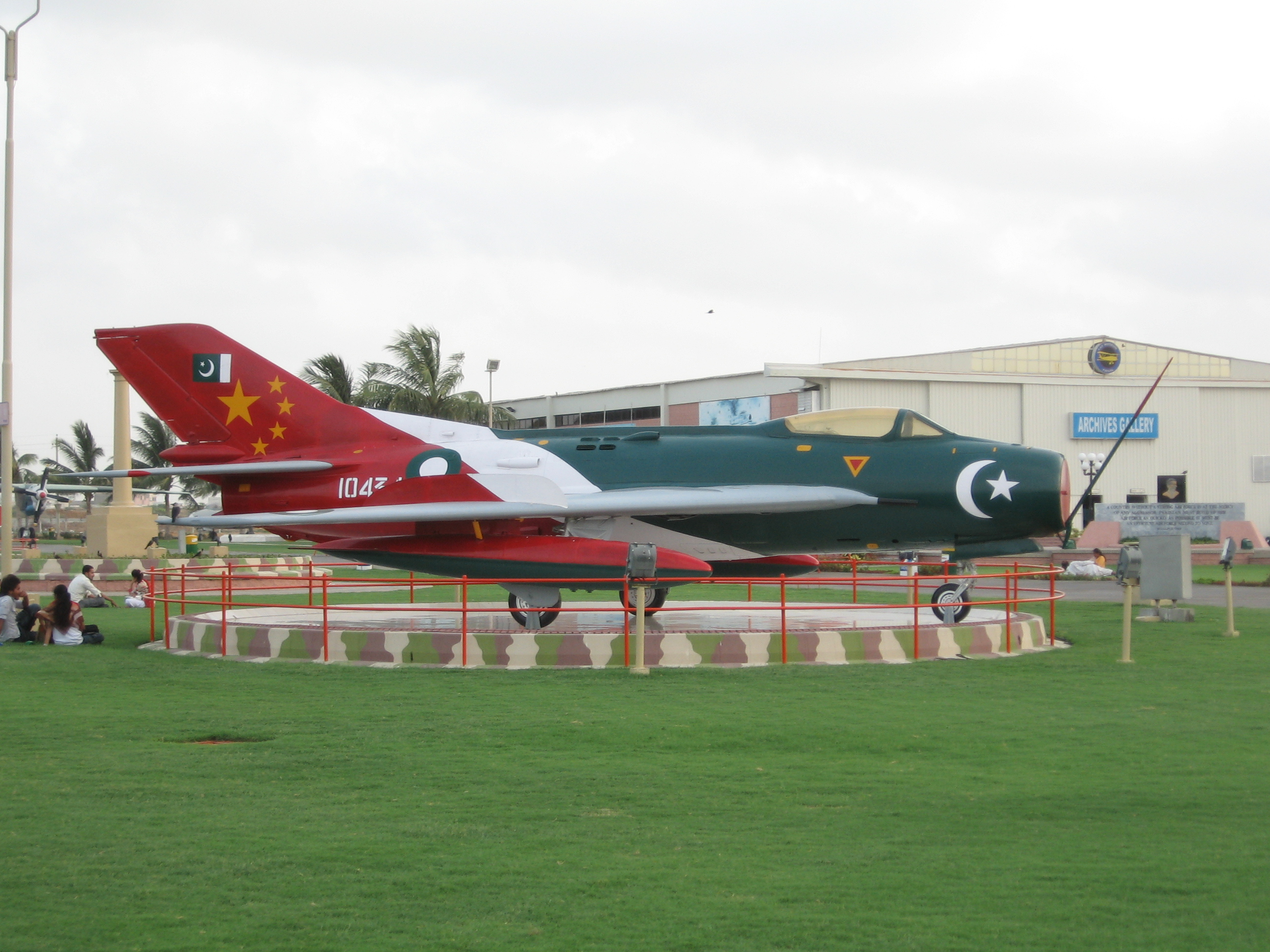
Retired Pakistan Air Force Shenyang F-6

By December 1980, the F-86 Sabre had become obsolete, thus the squadron was assigned the role of Air superiority and re-equipped with the Shenyang F-6 air superiority fighter.

=== Nanchang A-5C ===
In 1984, the squadron was re-equipped with the Nanchang A-5C, thus the unit became a Tactical Attack squadron. In 1985 it was awarded with the Flight Safety, Command Armament, and the Professionals Trophies. In April 1989, the squadron provided pilots to ferry A-5C fighters requiring overhaul to China. In 1991, the first four of the squadron's aircraft were fitted with new Martin-Baker ejection seats.

==== Afghanistan-Pakistan Skirmishes ====
During the Soviet Afghan War, the squadron's Officer Commanding "Wing Commander Wali Mughni" was scrambled to investigate an unidentified aircraft which was loitering at a no-fly zone on the border. Wali was later informed that the aircraft was an SU-25 and had defected from an 8-ship formation which was on a bombing run near the border. After being intercepted, the Su-25 lowered its landing gear and wiggled its wings as a sign of surrender. It later made a forced landing.

=== PAC JF-17 Thunder ===
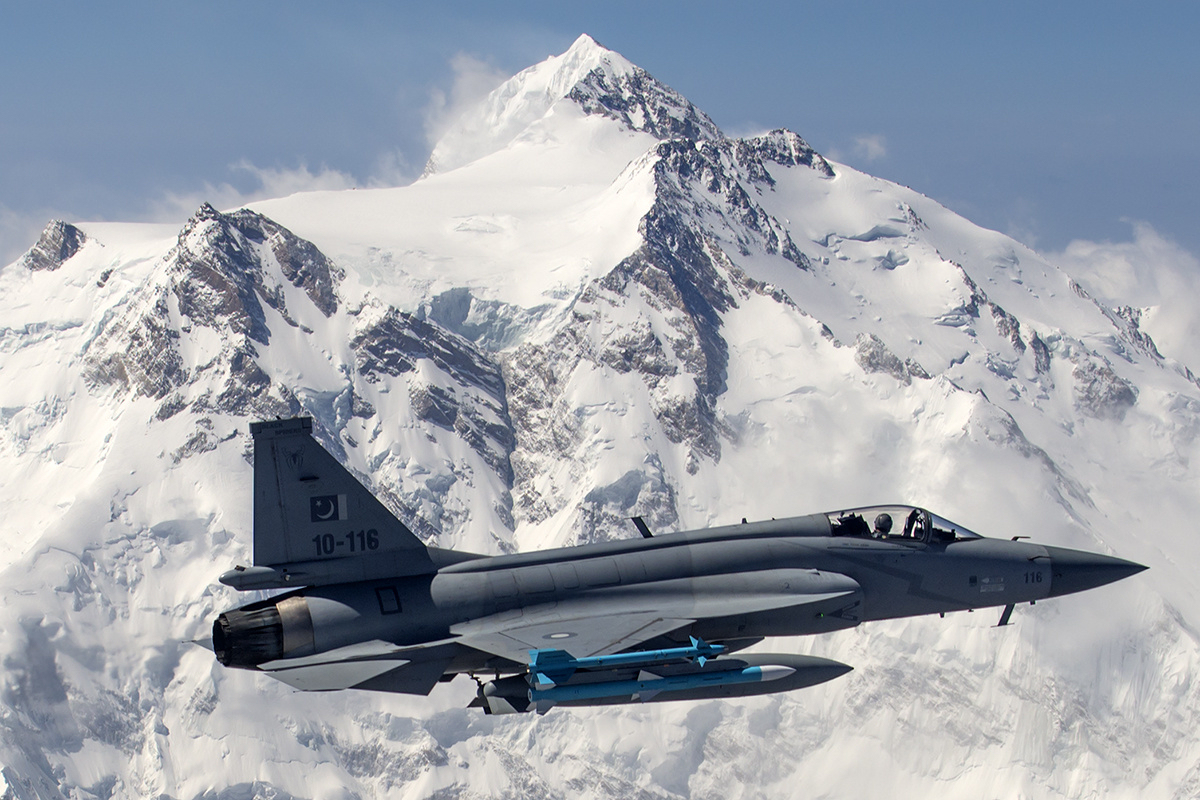
No. 26 squadron's JF-17 Thunder armed with captive PL-5E and SD-10 missiles flies over the Nanga Parbat

On 18 February 2010, the Black Spiders was re-equipped with 14 JF-17 thunders and thus became the PAF's first squadron to be equipped with the new aircraft resultantly attaining the role of multirole squadron. A special ceremony was held at the airbase in which then COAS "Rao Qamar Suleman" was also present. The Squadron also bid farewell to the A-5C during which it led two JF-17s in a spectacular flypast. Before their official induction however, the squadron's JF-17s were used in Operation Rah-e-Nijat against militants to test its weapons and effectiveness.

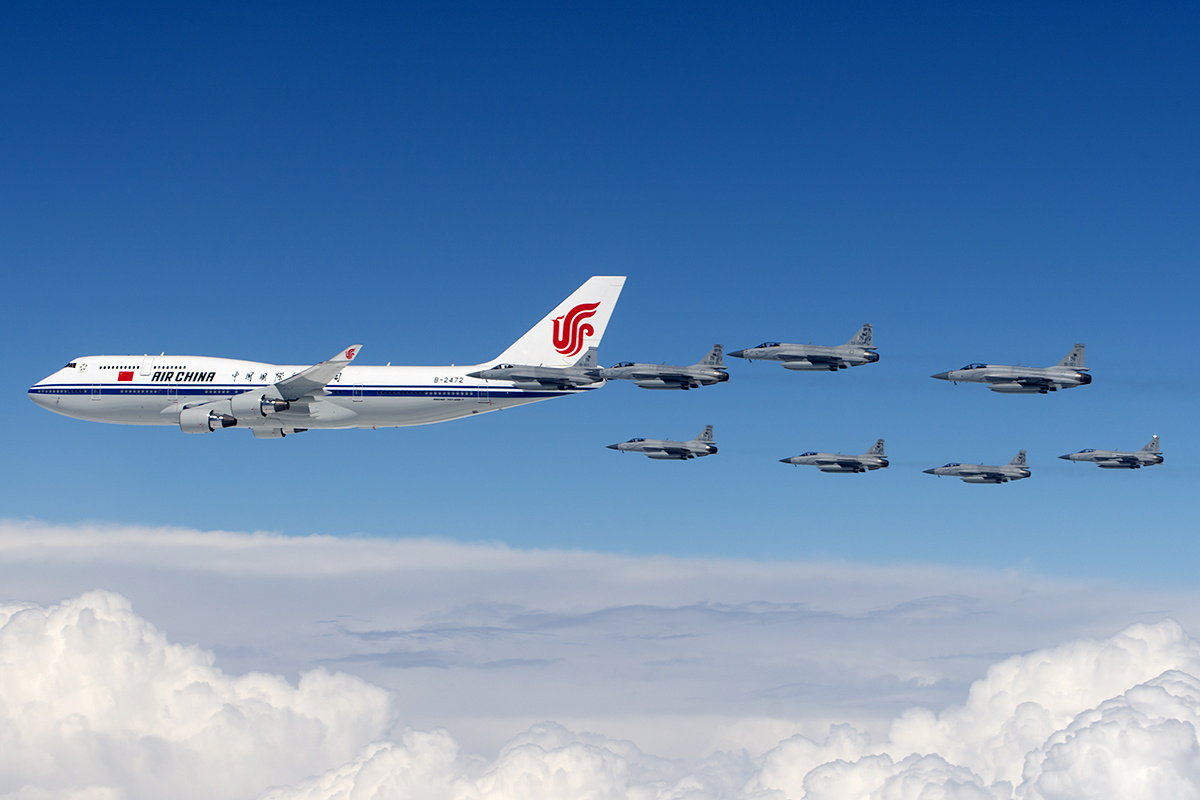
JF-17s from the No. 16 and No. 26 Squadrons escorting the Chinese President's Air China Boeing-747

In 2015, 8 JF-17s from the No. 16 and No. 26 Squadrons escorted President Xi's Boeing-747 during his official visit to Pakistan.

=== Exercises ===
- Flat Out 89
- Wide Awake 89
- 1989 air-to-air firing camp (PAF Base Masroor)
- ISAC 89 – inter-squadron armament competition, the squadron achieved first place and Wing Commander Wali Mughni was declared Sher Afghan.
- ACES 89 – air combat evaluations.
- High Mark 89
- 1992 DACT camp (PAF Base Minhas)
- Flat Out 92
- Wide Awake 92
- High Mark 93 – deployed at PAF Base Murid
- High Mark 95 – deployed at PAF Base Shahbaz (Jacobabad)
- Saffron Bandit 97
- 1998 DACT camp (PAF Base Minhas) – held from 14 to 30 December 1998, No. 26 was deployed with ten A-5C and all squadron pilots flew sorties during the deployment. Other squadrons deployed were No. 8 and No. 16 Squadrons.
- 1998 Armament cyclic training (PAF Base Mushaf, Sargodha) – ten pilots and eight A-5C deployed, 246 armament sorties flown in a 19-day period from 5 October to 24 October 1998.
- Awards:
  - Sarfraz Rafiqui Flight safety Trophy (1992)
  - Chief of Air Staff Professionals Trophy (1994)
  - Sarfraz Rafiqui Trophy (1994)
  - Sarfraz Rafiqui Trophy (1996)
  - Air Combat Evaluations – ACES Trophy (1996)

== Aircraft flown ==
No. 26 Squadron Black Spiders
Role	Operational	Aircraft	Notes
Fighter	1967–1981	F-86 Sabre	
Air Superiority	1981–1984	F-6C Farmer	
Tactical Attack	1984–2010	A-5C Fantan	
Multi-role	2010—Present	JF-17 Thunder (Block 1)	The PAF's first JF-17 squadron, formed from the JF-17 Test and Evaluation Flight.

== Gallery ==
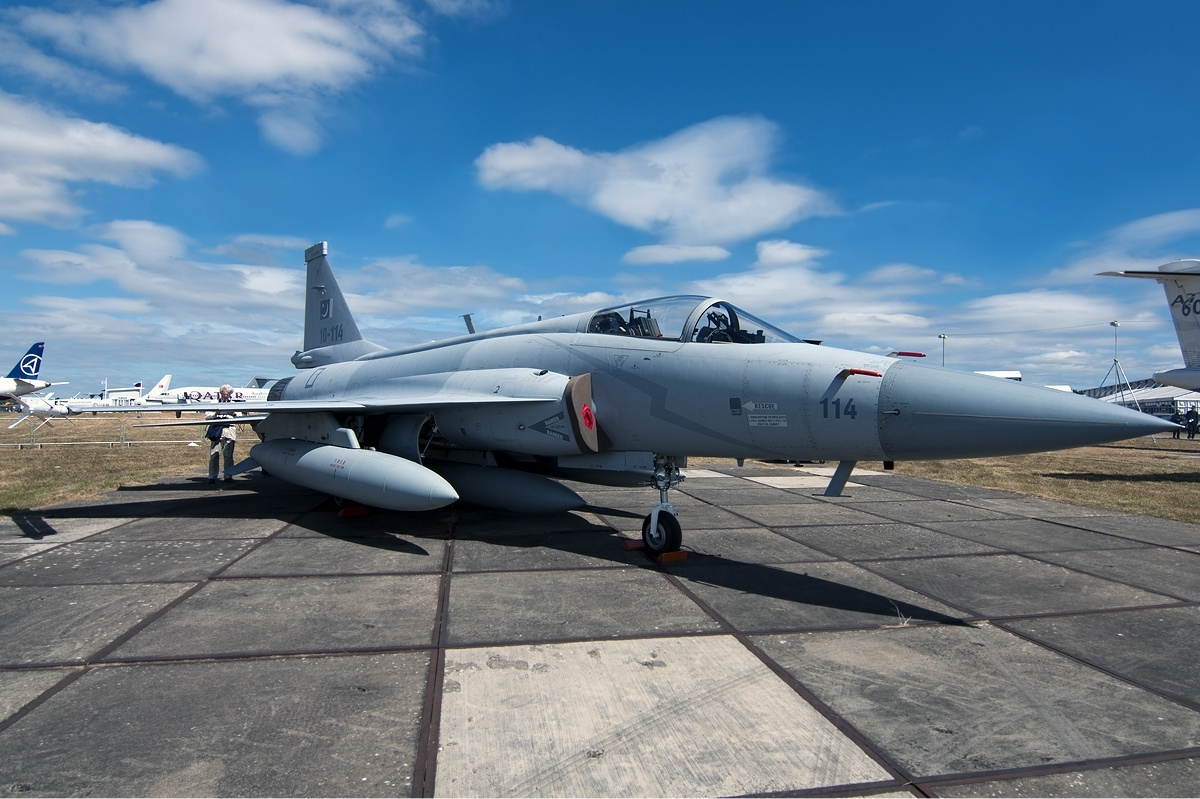
JF-17 from the No. 26 Squadron at the Farnborough Airshow

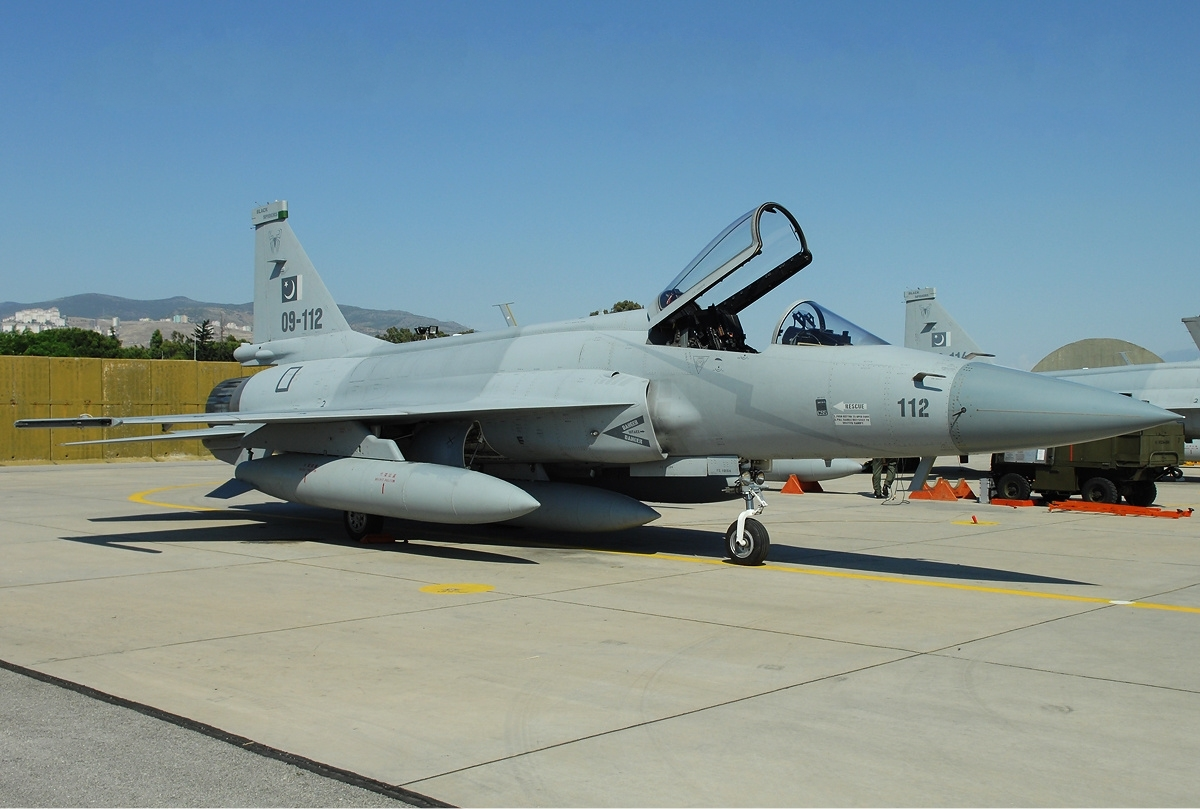
A JF-17 Thunder belonging to the No. 26 Squadron with its canopy open

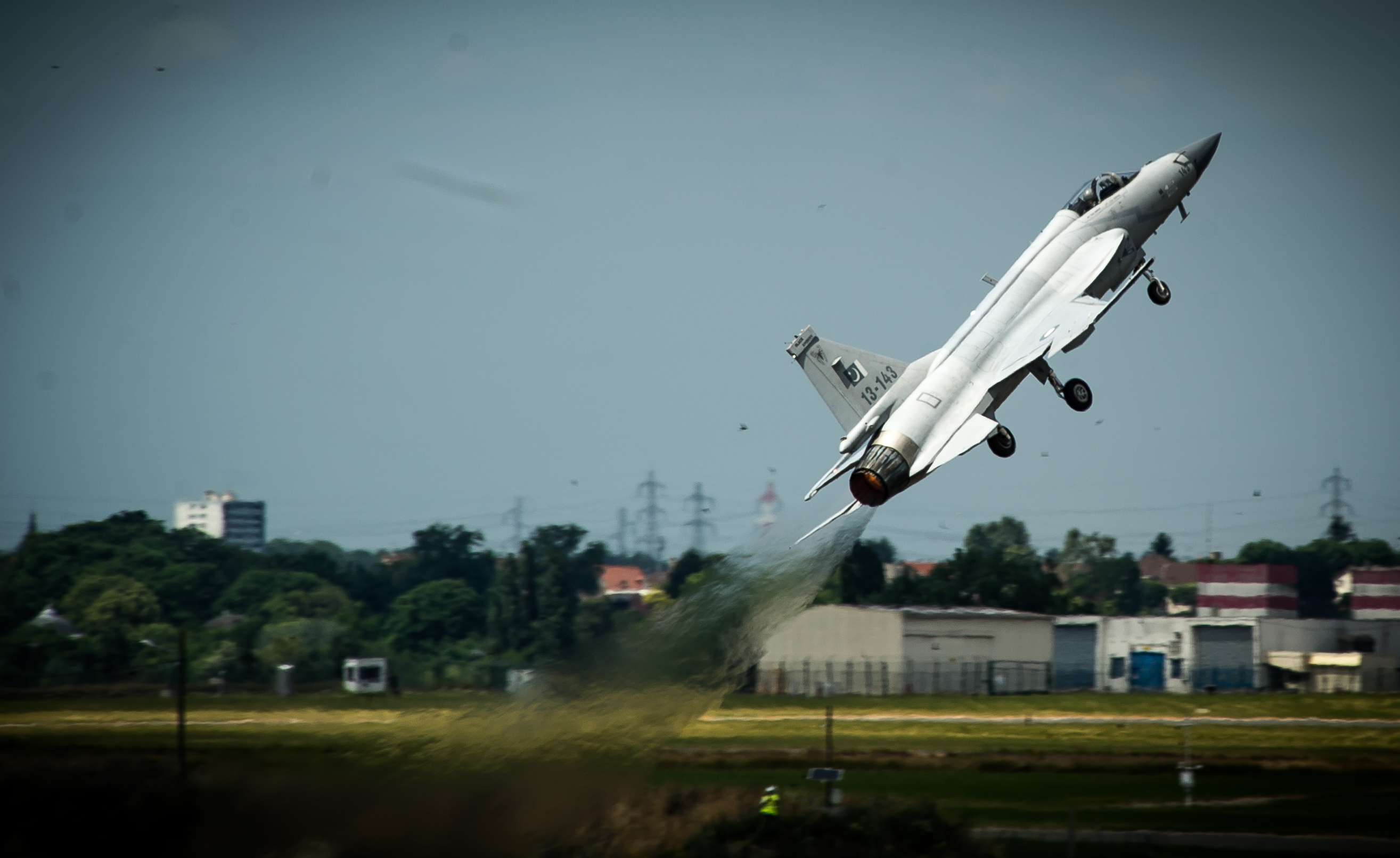
PAC JF-17 Thunder from the No. 26 Squadron during the 2015 Paris Airshow

== In popular culture ==
In 2019, the No. 26 Squadron was featured in the military combat flight simulator, DCS World. The No. 26 Squadron Livery was and is one of the base liveries available for the DCS: JF-17 module.

In 2021, the No. 26 Squadron was featured in the military combat video game, War Thunder, through a premium Nanchang A-5C. It came with the livery of the No. 26 Squadron "Black Spiders".

== See also ==
- List of Pakistan Air Force squadrons
- No. 16 Squadron (Pakistan Air Force)
