= No. 17 Squadron PAF =

No. 17 Squadron "Tigers"
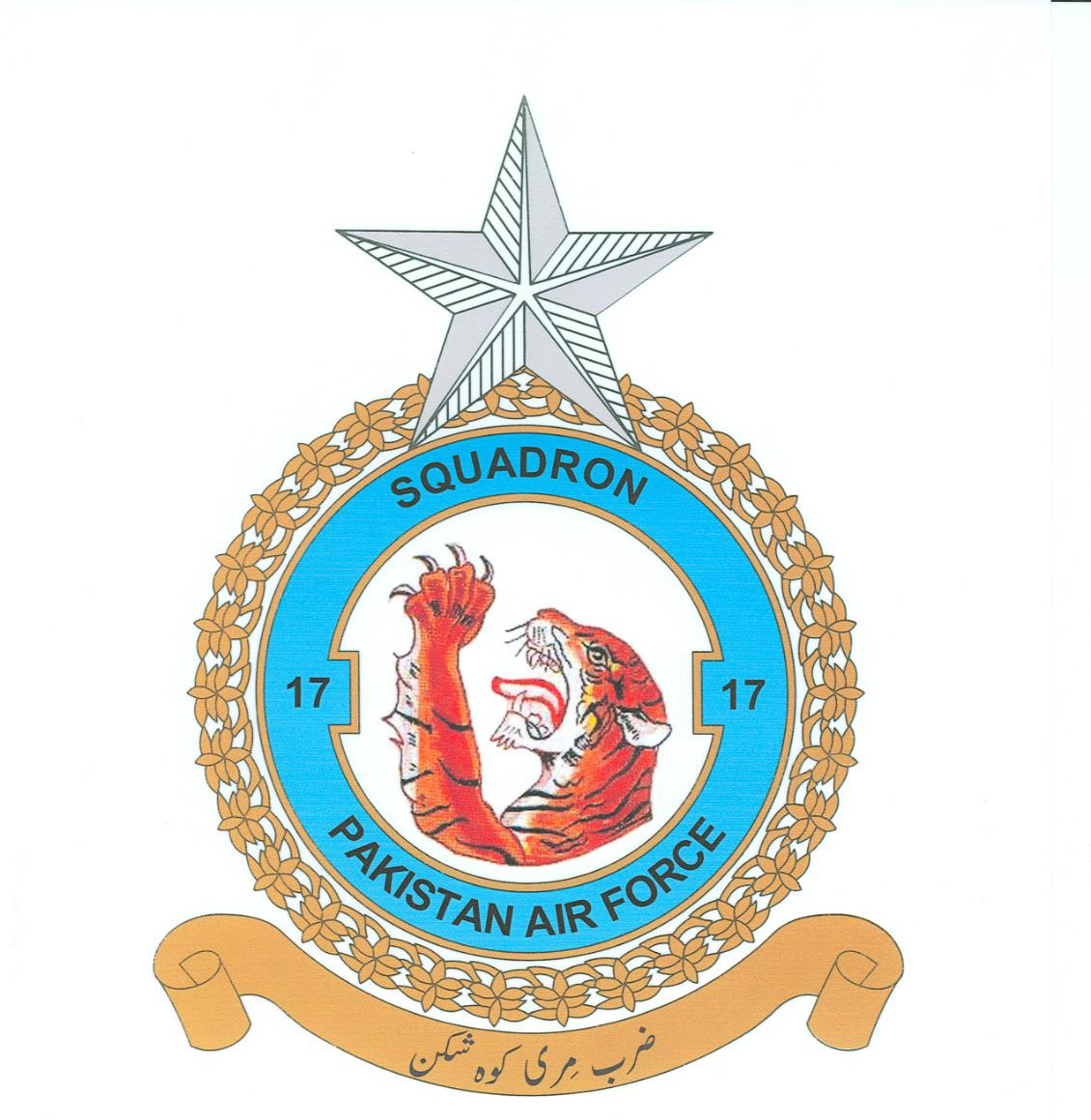
- Active: 1 April 1957 – Present
- Country: Pakistan
- Allegiance: Pakistan Armed Forces
- Branch: Pakistan Air Force
- Type: Fighter squadron
- Role: Air Superiority
- Part of: Northern Air Command
- Airbase: PAF Base Peshawar
- Nickname: Tigers
- Mottos: ضرب مری کوہ شکن (Urdu for 'Nothing can withstand my Potent Strike')
- Mascot: A Bengal Tiger
- Engagements: Indo-Pakistani conflicts; Operation Desert Hawk; Indo-Pakistani war of 1965; Indo-Pakistani Air War of 1965; Battle of Khem Kharan; Battle of Phillora; Indo-Pakistani war of 1971; Western theatre; Project-706; Air Cover for Chagai-I & Chagai-II; Spillover of Soviet - Afghan war in Pakistan
- Battle honours: 1. Rajasthan (1965); 2. Suleimanki (1971)

Commanders
- Notable commanders: Kazim Hammad; Azim Daudpota

Insignia
- Patch

Aircraft flown
- Fighter: F-86 Sabre; Canadair Sabre; Shenyang F-6; Chengdu F-7P; Chengdu F-7PG

The No. 17 Squadron nicknamed Tigers, is an air superiority squadron of the Pakistan Air Force's Northern Air Command. It is currently deployed at Peshawar Air Base and operates the Chengdu F-7PG aircraft.

== History ==
The No. 17 Squadron was raised on 1 April 1957 along with the No. 16 Squadron "Panthers" at PAF Base Masroor equipped with North American F-86 Sabres.

=== Operational history ===
==== Rann of Kutch Conflict ====
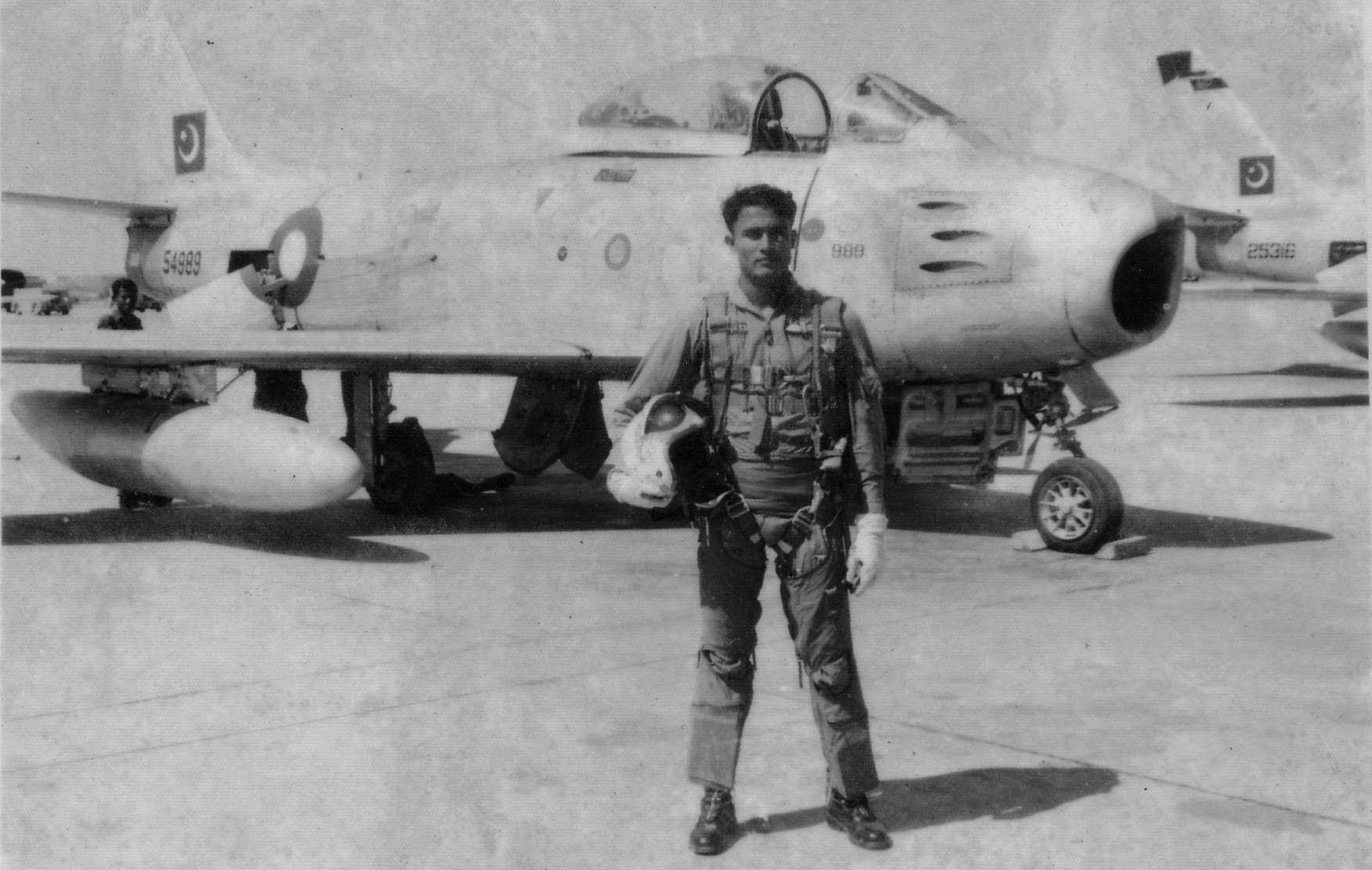
Flying Officer Ehsanul Karim of the No. 17 Squadron with his F-86 at Mauripur Airbase in 1965.

In April 1965, a series of battles took place over the then disputed area of Rann of Kutch. During the skirmishes, F-86 Sabres from the No. 17 Squadron flew several Combat Air Patrol and Close Air Support sorties in support of the Pakistan Army. The squadron lost one Sabre (including the pilot Flying Officer Ehsanul Kareem) during the conflict when it suffered an engine flameout attributed to improper aircraft maintenance during repairs after his sabre was damaged by Indian ack-ack. Karim remains one of the youngest pilot to be KIA in an F-86.

==== 1965 War ====
During rise in hostilities with India, 10 Sabres of the squadron were deployed at PAF Base Sargodha from Mauripur. After Indian forces invaded Pakistan in an attempt to halt the Pakistani advance in the disputed Kashmir region, the No. 17 Squadron was assigned with Close Air Support missions in the Sialkot, Lahore and Khem Karan sectors while also performing air defence operations in the Sargodha District. On 19 September, Squadron Leader Azim Daudpota and his three wingmen (Flight Lieutenants SM Ahmed, Mujtaba & Saiful Azam) flying North American F-86 Sabres were performing air strikes on Indian army positions at the Phillora area when they were intercepted by 2 Indian Folland Gnats of the IAF's No. 9 Squadron. In the ensuing Dog fight, Flight Lieutenant Azam shot down one of the IAF Gnat while the second one managed to escape. In another strike mission, Squadron Leader Azim Daudpota with Flying Officer Qadir and two more F-86 pilots performed a strike mission on Indian army artillery batteries around the Jallo and Attari sectors which were bombing the Lahore District, the formation managed to destroy several artillery guns. This formation was highly commended by the Pakistan Army field commanders in the Lahore Front. After the war officially ended, the squadron had managed to destroy or damage 20-30 Tanks and 100-150 military vehicles. In addition to that, the squadron also claimed to have killed about 150-200 Indian troops in their Close Air Support missions.

==== 1971 War ====
During the 1971 conflict, the No. 17 Squadron was deployed at PAF Base Rafiqui and equipped with the Canadair Sabre (Also known as the F-86E in the PAF). The squadron under the command of Wing Commander Mujtaba Qureshi flew 337 sorties out of which 272 were combat ones. The combat sorties consisted of Air Defence missions, Counter Air Strikes and Close Air Support missions at Kasur, Hussainiwala and Lahore sectors. However, Five Sabres of the squadron were damaged due to enemy fire while one was lost in an accident when it suffered an engine flameout, the pilot Flight Lieutenant Nayyer Iqbal was fatally injured.

==== Soviet-Afghan War ====
In May 1983, the No. 17 Squadron while operating from Samungli Airbase along with the No. 23 Squadron "Talons" was put on air defence alert after a surge in aerial intrusions by Afghan and Soviet warplanes during the Soviet-Afghan war. It performed 682 CAP missions and 238 hot scrambles. Unfortunately, the record of the aerial interceptions and other events was not maintained.

== Aircraft Flown ==
No. 17 Squadron Tigers
Role	Operational	Aircraft	Notes
Fighter-Bomber	1957–1966	F-86F Sabre	
Fighter-Bomber	1966-1977	Canadair Sabre	
Air Superiority	1977–2001	Shenyang F-6C	
Fighter	2001–present	Chengdu F-7PG	

== Gallery ==
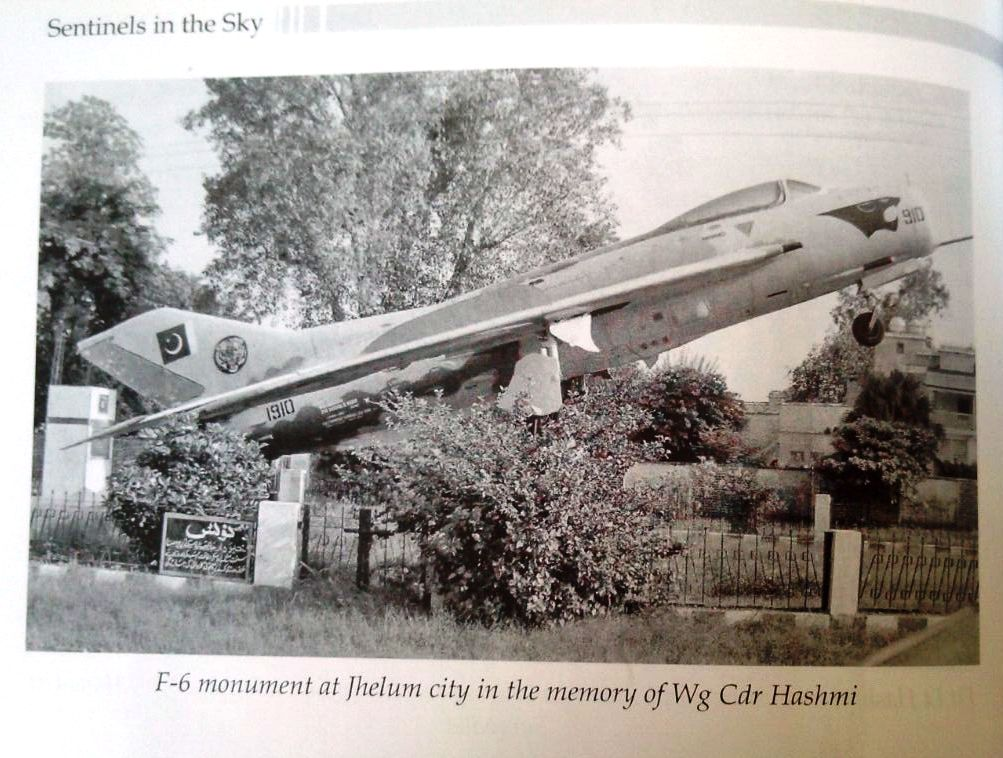

== See also ==
- List of Pakistan Air Force squadrons
  - No. 16 Squadron PAF
- No. 17 Squadron RAF
- No. 17 Squadron RNZAF
