= Hangu (river) =

- Location within Romania

Location
- Country: Romania
- Counties: Neamț County
- Villages: Hangu

Physical characteristics
- Mouth: Bistrița
  - location: Lake Izvorul Muntelui near Hangu
  - coordinates: 47.0553°N 26.0349°E
- Length: 11 km (6.8 mi)
- Basin size: 68 km^{2} (26 sq mi)

Basin features
- Progression: Bistrița→ Siret→ Danube→ Black Sea
- Tributaries
  - left: Audia
- River code: XII.1.53.43

The Hangu is a left tributary of the river Bistrița in Romania. It flows into Lake Izvorul Muntelui in the proximity of the village Hangu. Its length is 11 km (6.8 mi) and its basin size is 68 km^{2} (26 sq mi).
