= PAF Base Peshawar =

Pakistan Air Force military installation

PAF Base Peshawar
- د پېښور هوايي اډه
- Peshawar District, Khyber Pakhtunkhwa in Pakistan
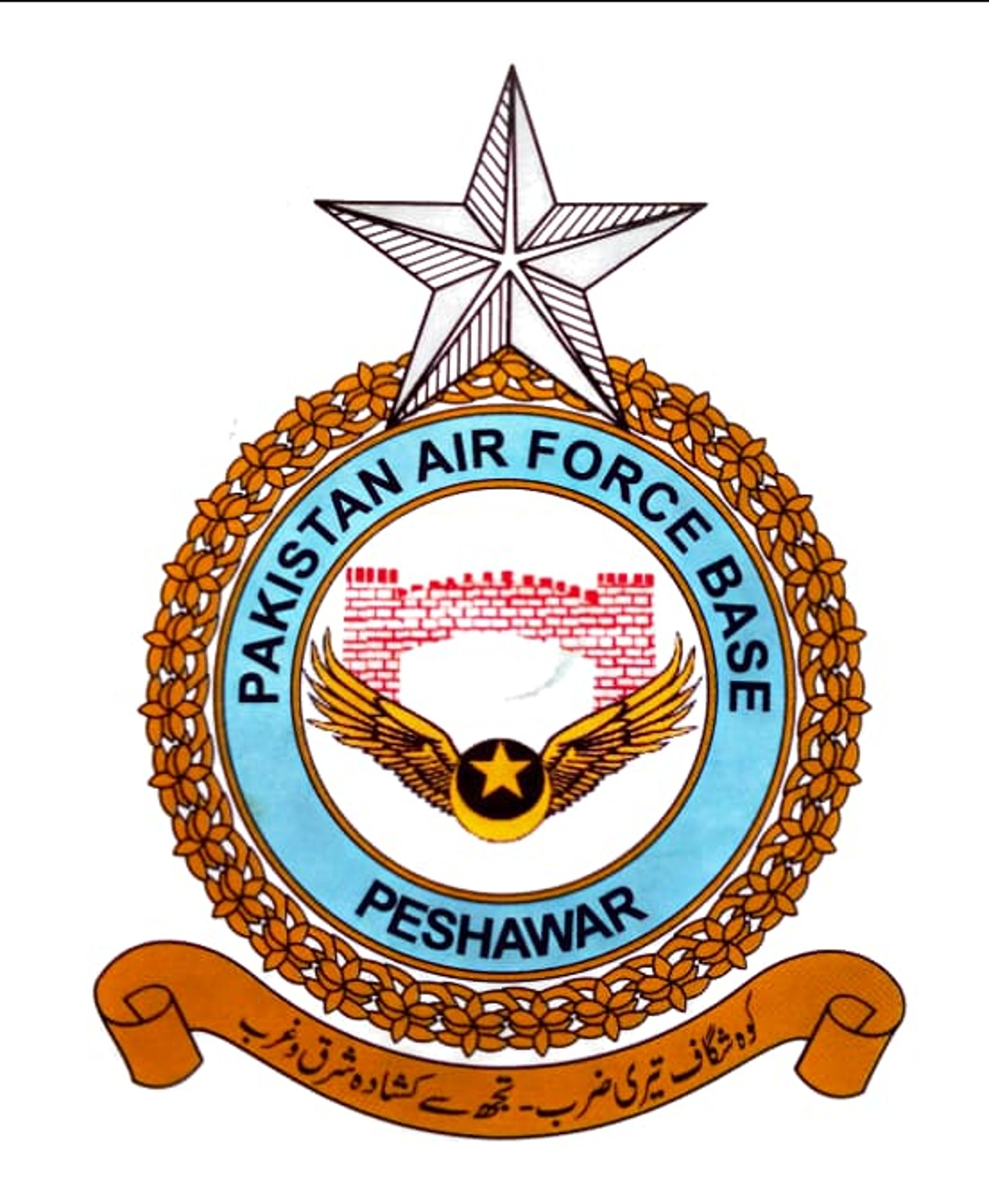

Site information
- Type: Air Force base
- Owner: Ministry of Defense
- Operator: Pakistan Air Force
- Controlled by: Northern Air Command
- Condition: Operational
- Other site facilities: Helicopter Flying Training School
- Website: Pakistan Air Force

Location
- Location of Peshawar airbase in Pakistan PAF Base Peshawar (Pakistan) PAF Base Peshawar (Asia)
- Coordinates: 33.9944°N 71.5289°E

Site history
- Built: 1918
- Built for: British Raj; Pakistan Air Force
- Built by: British Raj (foundation)
- In use: 1918 - present
- Battles/wars: 1965 Indo-Pakistani war 1971 Indo-Pakistani war Operation Sentinel; Operation Swift Retort

Garrison information
- Current commander: Air Cdre. Syed Inam
- Garrison: 36 TA Wing
- Occupants: 17 Squadron "Tigers"; 26 Squadron "Black Spiders"; 81 Rescue Squadron "Kangaroos"

Airfield information
- Identifiers: IATA: PEW, ICAO: OPPS
- Elevation: 369 metres (1,211 ft) AMSL
Runways
Direction	Length and surface
17/35	2,743 metres (8,999 ft) Asphalt

Pakistan Air Force Base, Peshawar is an airbase of the Pakistan Air Force (PAF) located in Peshawar, Khyber Pakhtunkhwa, Pakistan. It is the operational site of the PAF's Northern Air Command, located to the east of Bacha Khan International Airport, which is shared by both civil aviation flights and military flights.

== History ==
The site was originally established by the British as RAF Peshawar. It was formerly used by the Royal Air Force between 1918 and 1947. The first wing headquarters to arrive appears to have been No. 52 (Corps) Wing in March 1918, and then No. 1 (British Indian) Wing from 1921-28. The first flying squadron reported at Peshawar was No. 31 Squadron RAF between 31 October 1921 and 17 April 1923 with the Bristol F.2B Fighter, which came back between December 1939 and February 1941.

The following other units were here at some point:

- No. 5 Squadron RAF between 22 January and 3 July 1947 with the Hawker Tempest F.2
- No. 20 Squadron RAF initially between 5 January and 22 May 1925 with the Bristol F.2B Fighter, then returning on 12 October 1925 and staying on and off until 1 May 1942 operating the Westland Wapiti then the Hawker Audax and finally the Westland Lysander II
- No. 27 Squadron RAF between 26 May and 12 October 1925 with the Airco DH.9A
- No. 28 Squadron RAF initially between 19 April 1923 and 5 January 1925 with the F2B Fighter, followed by detachments during 1931 and 1939
- No. 34 Squadron RAF detachment between June and December 1942 with the Bristol Blenheim IV
- No. 39 Squadron RAF detachment between March 1929 and November 1931 operatingthe Wapiti
- No. 60 Squadron RAF initially between 29 May and 15 October 1925 with the DH.9A then between March 1939 and February 1941 as a detachment
- No. 155 Squadron RAF between 1 April and 9 July 1942
- No. 659 Squadron RAF from 12 January 1946 then downsizing to a detachment from January 1947 operating the Taylorcraft Auster V & Auster AOP.6. The squadron was disbanded on 14 August 1947.

No. 223 Group RAF was located at the station between 1 May - 30 November 1942, and then from May 1944 - 15 August 1945. Nos 3 and 4 Squadron RIAF were operating from Kohat under No. 223 Group on 1 July 1942 and 1 January 1943. On 1 January 1943 they were both flying Hawker Hurricanes. By 1 January 1943 they had been joined by No. 215 Squadron RAF flying Vickers Wellingtons from Chaklala, though No. 215 Squadron was non-operational.

=== PAF Peshawar ===
Following World War II, RAF Peshawar was abandoned, and was later redeveloped for usage by the Pakistan Air Force. In November 1957, PAF Station Peshawar was opened, and began operating as a primary PAF base. By 1958, the station was equipped with 5 concrete and metal hangars, permanent accommodations for 900 personnel, a 41-bed hospital, and administrative and storage facilities. It was capable of storing up to 73,000 gallons of avgas and jet fuel. In 1958, the airfield oversaw improvements under a "NAAG" program, which led to the construction of 2,743 meter (8,999 ft)-long asphalt runway.

== Units ==
The airbase is currently home to the following PAF squadrons:

- No. 17 Squadron "Tigers"
- No. 26 Squadron "Black Spiders"
- No. 81 Squadron "Kangaroos"

== Notable incidents ==
- The airbase was the site of the 2012 Bacha Khan International Airport terrorist attack by the Tehrik-i-Taliban Pakistan (TTP), which left around nine people dead (including five TTP terrorists) and over 40 injured.
- One day after the Bacha Khan International Airport attack, on 16 December 2012, five terrorists and a police officer died and two police officers were wounded in a gunfight near the airbase. The security forces stated that the terrorists were Uzbeks and accomplices of the TTP terrorists killed during the previous day's attack on the airport.

== See also ==
- List of Pakistan Air Force bases
