= No. 11 Squadron PAF =

Pakistan Air Force fighter squadron

No. 11 Squadron Arrows
- Logo of the squadron
- Active: 1 January 1949
- Country: Pakistan
- Allegiance: Pakistan
- Branch: Pakistan Air Force
- Type: Fighter squadron
- Role: Multi-role, Operational Conversion Unit (OCU)
- Part of: No. 39 Multi-Role Wing; Southern Air Command
- Airbase: PAF Base Shahbaz (Jacobabad)
- Nickname: Arrows
- Motto: Your destination is above everyone else’s destination.
- Mascot: An arrow pointing up through a circle of stars.
- Aircraft: F-16A/B Block 15 MLU
- Engagements: 1965 Indo-Pak War; 1971 Indo-Pak War; 2019 Indo-Pakistani Conflict; Operation Swift Retort; Project-706; Operation Sentinel; Soviet–Afghan War; Spillover of Soviet - Afghan war in Pakistan; War On terror
- Battle honours: Sargodha 65

Commanders
- Notable commanders: Nur Khan; Abdul Rahim Khan; FS Hussain; Mitty Masud; Zulfiqar Ali Khan; Anwar Shamim; MM Alam; Sattar Alvi; W. J. M. Turowicz; Yousuf Ali Khan; Rizwan Ullah Khan

Insignia
- Patch

Aircraft flown
- Fighter: Supermarine Attacker (1951–1956); F-86F Sabre (1956–1966); Shenyang F-6 (1966–1983); F-16 Fighting Falcon (1983–present)

No. 11 Squadron, named the Arrows, is a Pakistan Air Force (PAF) fighter squadron assigned to the No. 39 multi-role Wing of the PAF Southern Air Command. It operates the Block 15 MLU model of the F-16 Fighting Falcon with a multi-role tasking and is also an Operational Conversion Unit (OCU).

The 11 Squadron became the winners of the 2019 Inter Squadron Armament Competition (ISAC-2019) which was held at Sonmiani firing range in October 2019.

== History ==
When sanctions and an arms embargo was placed on Pakistan by the U.S. after the 1965 war, the Arrows were re-equipped with the Shenyang F-6 in 1966 and their role changed to Air Superiority. The unit moved to PAF Base Rafiqui in January 1971, moving back to Sargodha during the 1971 Indo-Pak War. Again, the squadron flew Air Defence and Close Air Support missions during which a Sukhoi Su-7 and a MiG-21 were shot down. One of the squadron's F-6 fighter was shot down over India. After the war, the squadron returned to PAF Base Rafiqui. During these wars, the Arrows were credited with the highest number of kills of any PAF squadron.

=== 2019 Jammu and Kashmir Airstrikes ===
The No. 11 Squadron played a vital role during hostilities in 2019 with India. An F-16B Block-20 MLU (S. No. 84606) flown by Squadron Leader Hasan Siddiqui also supposedly shot down an Indian SU-30MKI from the No. 221 Squadron IAF with an AIM-120 BVR missile.

== Aircraft Flown ==
No. 11 Squadron Arrows
| Role | Operational | Aircraft | Notes |
|---|---|---|---|
| Fighter Interceptor | 1951–1956 | Supermarine Attacker; Type 538 Attacker FB.50 | A land-based variant of the naval Attacker, powered by RR Nene 4, 36 built for the PAF, first delivered in 1953. |
| Fighter Bomber | 1956–1966 | F-86 Sabre; F-86F | |
| Air Superiority | 1966–1983 | Shenyang F-6; F-6C | |
| Multi-role; Operational Conversion Unit | 1983—Present | F-16 Fighting Falcon; F-16AM/BM Block 15 MLU | The PAF's first F-16 squadron. |

== Gallery ==
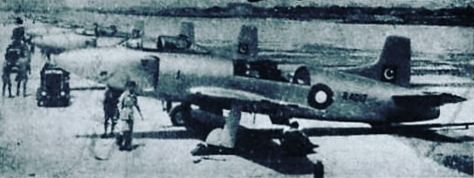
Pakistani Supermarine Attackers

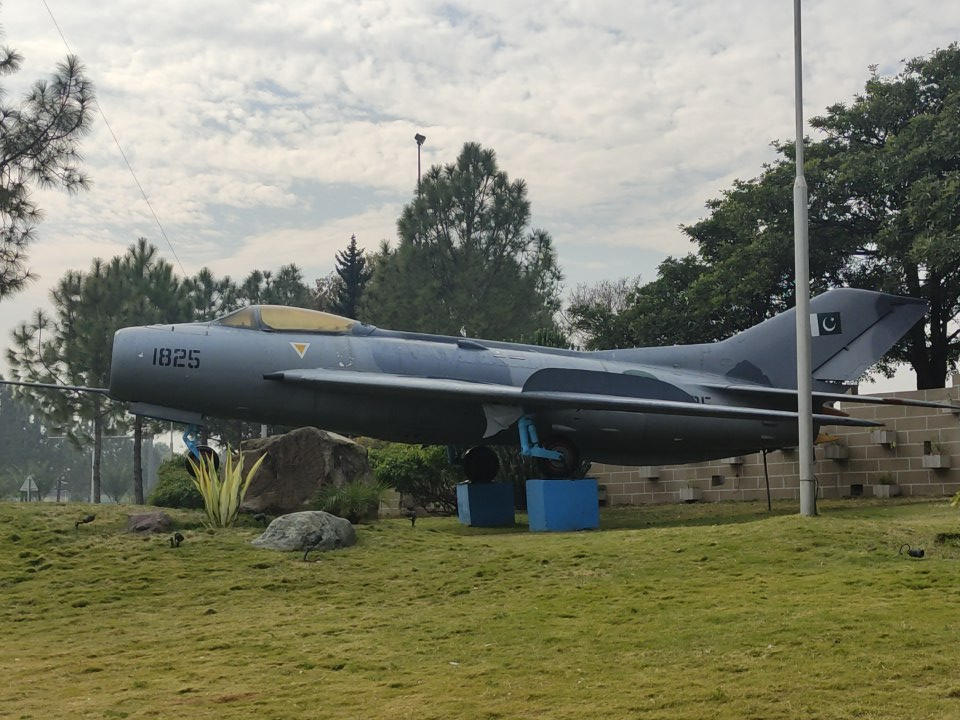
Shenyang F-6 (Serial#1825), this particular aircraft scored a sidewinder kill on an Indian Mig-21 over Shakargarh

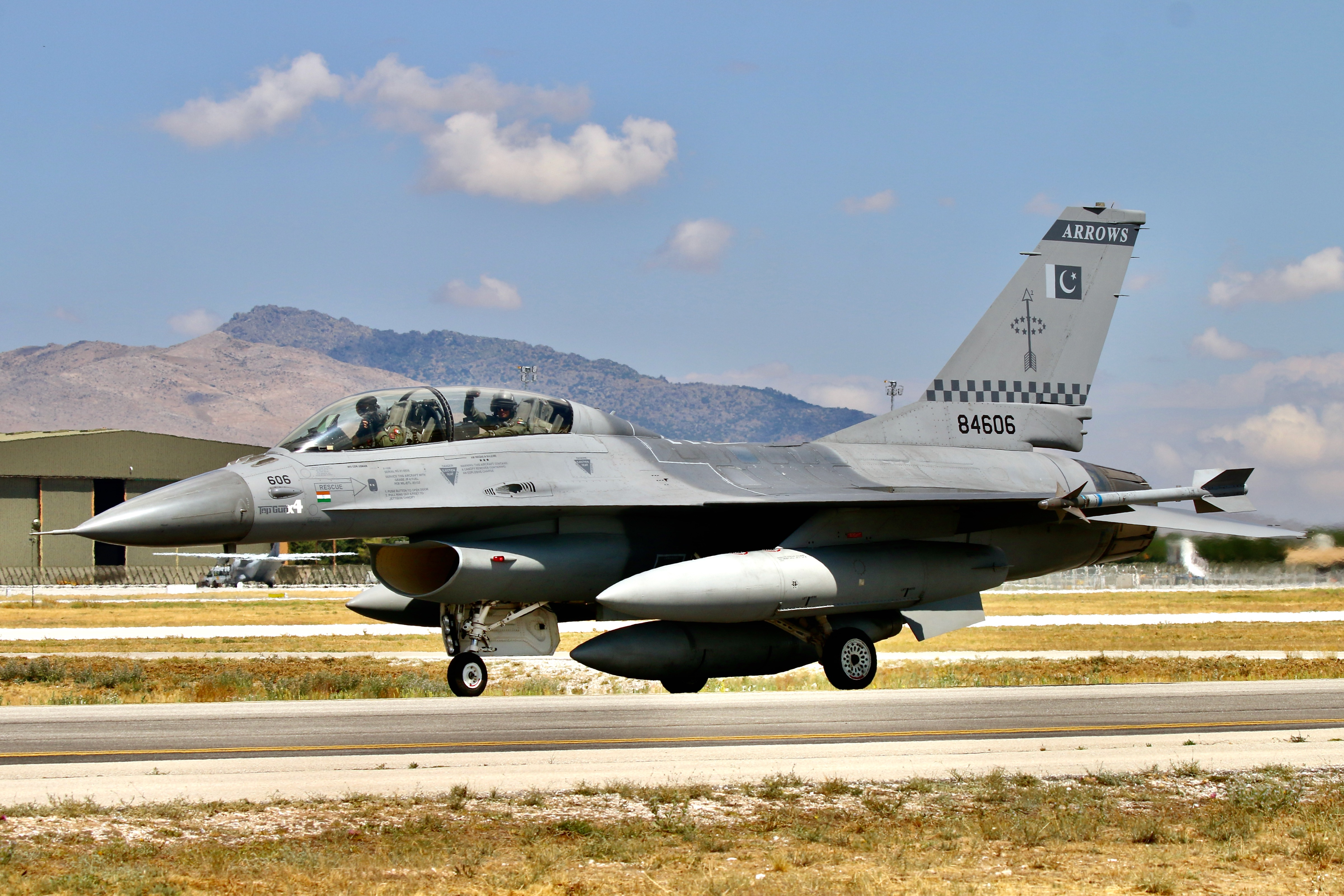
The F-16BM which supposedly shot down an Indian warplane in 2019 (Indian flag as kill mark visible on the nose)

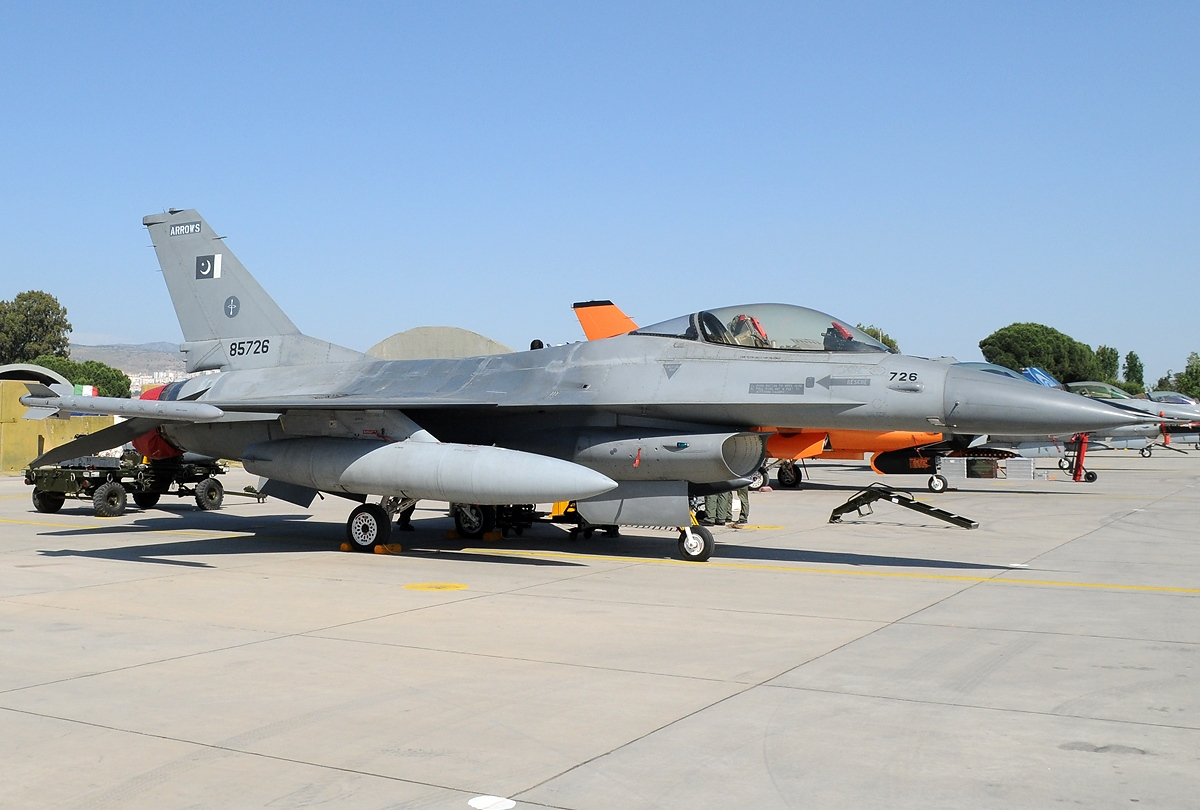
Lockheed Martin F-16 of the No. 11 Squadron

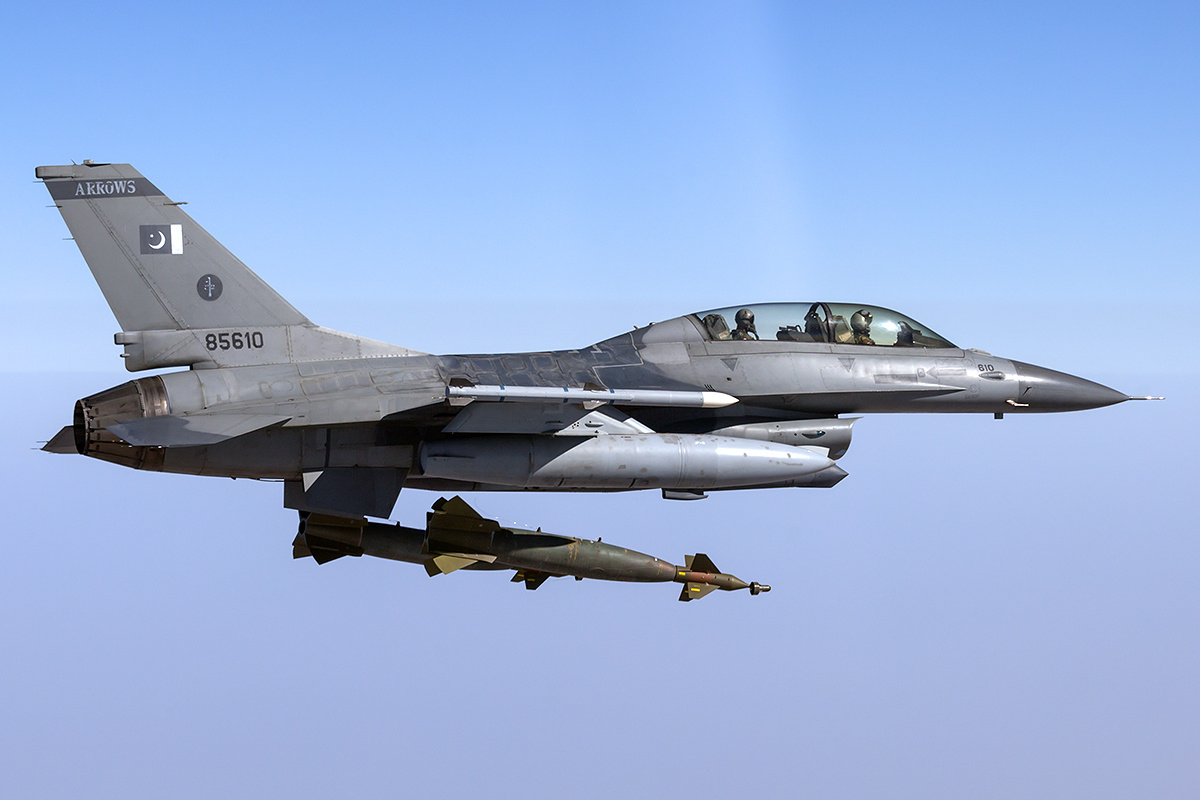
Lockheed Martin F-16BM of the No. 11 Squadron drops 2000lb GBU-10s

== See also ==
- List of Pakistan Air Force squadrons
- No. 9 Squadron (Pakistan Air Force)
- No. 16 Squadron (Pakistan Air Force)
- No. 26 Squadron (Pakistan Air Force)
