= Zulfiqar Ali Khan =

2nd Pakistani Air Chief and diplomat (1930-2005)

Zulfiqar Ali Khan SK LOM
- ذوالفقارعلی خان

2nd Chief of Air Staff Pakistan Air Force
- In office 16 April 1974 – 22 July 1978
- Preceded by: Zafar Chaudhry
- Succeeded by: Anwar Shamim

Pakistan Ambassador to the United States
- In office 12 July 1989 – 15 September 1990
- Preceded by: Jamsheed Marker
- Succeeded by: Najmuddin Shaikh

Officer Commanding No. 11 Squadron PAF
- In office August 1958 – 5 March 1963
- Succeeded by: Anwar Shamim

Officer Commanding No. 20 Squadron PAF
- In office 28 March 1956 – 7 July 1957

Personal details
- Born: 10 December 1930 Lahore, Punjab, British India
- Died: 8 March 2005 (aged 74) Islamabad, Pakistan
- Cause of death: Cardiac arrest
- Resting place: H-8 Graveyard, Islamabad
- Spouse: Sajida Haq Nawaz Khan (m. 1965; died 2012)
- Children: 3
- Relatives: Mohammad Akbar Khan (cousin); Brigadier Agha Ali Hassan (nephew); Brigadier Muhammad Azam Agha (nephew)
- Education: Military College Jhelum; RPAF College; Flying Instructors School; PAF Staff College

Military service
- Branch/service: Pakistan Air Force
- Years of service: 1950–1978
- Rank: Air Chief Marshal
- Commands: PAF Academy; PAF Base Dacca; PAF Camp Badaber; PAF Base Sargodha; No. 9 Squadron PAF; No. 11 Squadron PAF
- Awards: See list

Zulfiqar Ali Khan (Note: Urdu: ذوالفقارعلی خان) (10 December 1930 – 8 March 2005) was the second Chief of Air Staff of the Pakistan Air Force, serving from April 1974 to July 1978, and became the first air officer to hold a four-star rank in 1976. He was also the first graduate of the PAF Academy to have reached the position. He later served as Pakistan's Ambassador to Switzerland (accredited to Albania and Vatican City) in 1980 and the United States from July 1989 to September 1990.

== Early life ==
Zulfiqar Ali Khan was born in Lahore on 10 December 1930, to Agha Shujaat Ali Khan and his wife Anjum.

He was an alumnus of the Military College Jhelum.

== Personal life ==
Zulfiqar married Sajida Haq Nawaz Khan in 1965. They had three children, two sons and one daughter. Sajida died in 2012 and her funeral was attended by surviving former Chiefs of Air Staff, politicians, and others.

== Career in the Air Force ==
Zulfiqar Ali Khan was commissioned into the Royal Pakistan Air Force from the RPAF College as a GD (P) pilot on 21 December 1950. On 28 March 1956, Flight Lieutenant Khan was selected to command the newly raised No. 20 Sqn. He also attended the PAF Staff College.

Squadron Leader Zulfiqar Ali Khan was appointed Officer Commanding No. 9 Sqn in October 1957 and No. 11 Sqn in September 1958. Wing Commander Khan briefly served as air attaché at the High Commission of Pakistan, New Delhi from 1965 to 1966.

He was appointed Commander No. 31 Wing PAF in January 1967. Promoted to Group Captain, he was appointed Commander PAF Base Dacca in April 1967. He also commanded PAF Camp Badaber from 1971 to 1972.

Air Commodore Khan was appointed Commander PAF Base Sargodha in May 1972 and Commandant of PAF Academy in February 1973.

In 1974, he was promoted to Air Vice Marshal and appointed Director Operations and Plans and then Chief of Air Staff Operations.

=== Chief of Air Staff (1974—1978) ===
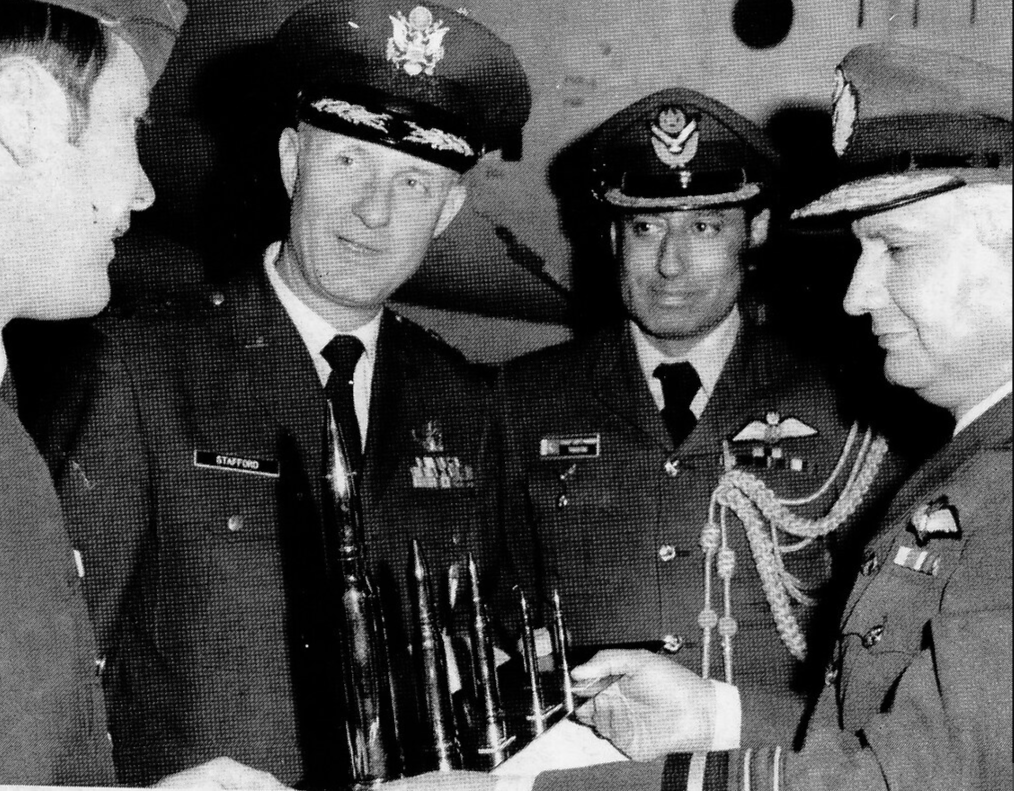
Major General Thomas P. Stafford, Group Captain Sajad Haider, and Air Marshal Zulfiqar Ali Khan at Edwards AFB, 1974-75

On 15 April 1974, Air Vice Marshal Zulfiqar Ali Khan was appointed as the second Chief of Air Staff. He was promoted to the rank of Air Marshal on 6 September 1974.

In 1975, he helped established the Northern Air Command, based in PAF Base Kalabagh, oversaw the induction of the MiG-15 as a jet trainer, establishment of the Air Defence Command, and provided his support to rebuilding Mirage III aircraft at the Pakistan Aeronautical Complex.

On 1 January 1976, Khan was promoted to air chief marshal (ACM), becoming the first four-star rank officer of the Pakistan Air Force.

During this same time, ACM Zulfiqar Ali Khan chose Group Captains Hakimullah Khan Durrani and Cecil Chaudhry to establish the Combat Commanders' School.

Over the issue of its clandestine atomic bomb programme, the United States offered Pakistan 120 modern A-7 jets to give up its reprocessing plant. ACM Zulfiqar Ali Khan advised Prime Minister Zulfikar Ali Bhutto that the "atomic bomb programme should not for any reason be compromised."

In May 1976, Air Chief Marshal Zulfiqar Ali Khan was among the military officials who accompanied Prime Minister Zulfikar Ali Bhutto on his state visit to Pyongyang, North Korea.

On 5 July 1977, General Zia-ul-Haq carried out his military coup d'état against the civilian government of Prime Minister Zulfikar Ali Bhutto and appointed a four member Military Council to assist him. The council comprised Zulfiqar Ali Khan, Chairman Joint Chiefs of Staff General Muhammad Shariff, Admiral Mohammad Shariff, and General Zia himself.

On 22 July 1978, ACM Zulfiqar Ali Khan tendered his resignation from the command of the air force over the disagreement with the military take over of the civilian government, and handed over the command to Anwar Shamim.

== Diplomatic career ==
Zulfiqar Ali Khan joined the Foreign Service and was appointed Pakistan's ambassador to Switzerland, serving from 26 January 1979 to 1981.

He was appointed as Pakistan's Ambassador to the United States in July 1989. In 1990, he was recalled to Pakistan after serving as ambassador for only a year.

== Later life ==
In 1989, he was appointed as chief investigator to lead investigations on possible military funding to political parties by the intelligence community.

In 1989, Prime Minister Benazir Bhutto set up a committee under (Retd) Air Chief Marshal Zulfiqar Ali Khan to revamp the intelligence agencies. The committee, known as The Zulfiqar Committee, recommended that the National Security Council be set up under the prime minister. The committee also recommended that the Afghan cell within the Inter-Services Intelligence (ISI) be abolished.

In April 2003, Khan was among the Veterans of Pakistan (VOP) who were concerned with the situation of the country and had sought to meet with General Musharraf to express their concerns.

== Death ==
On 8 March 2005, Zulfiqar Ali Khan died of cardiac arrest in Islamabad when he had a heart attack at his residence. He was taken to the PAF Hospital in Islamabad but doctors pronounced him dead. He was buried with full military honours.

== Awards and decorations ==
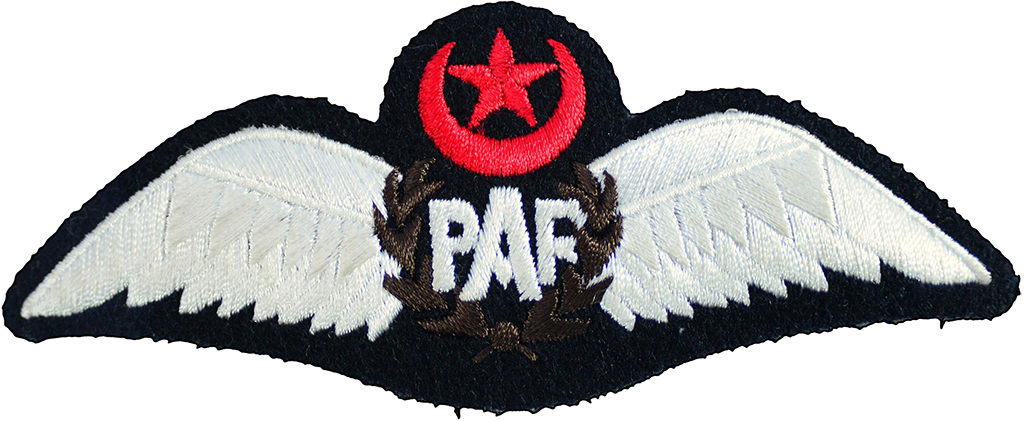

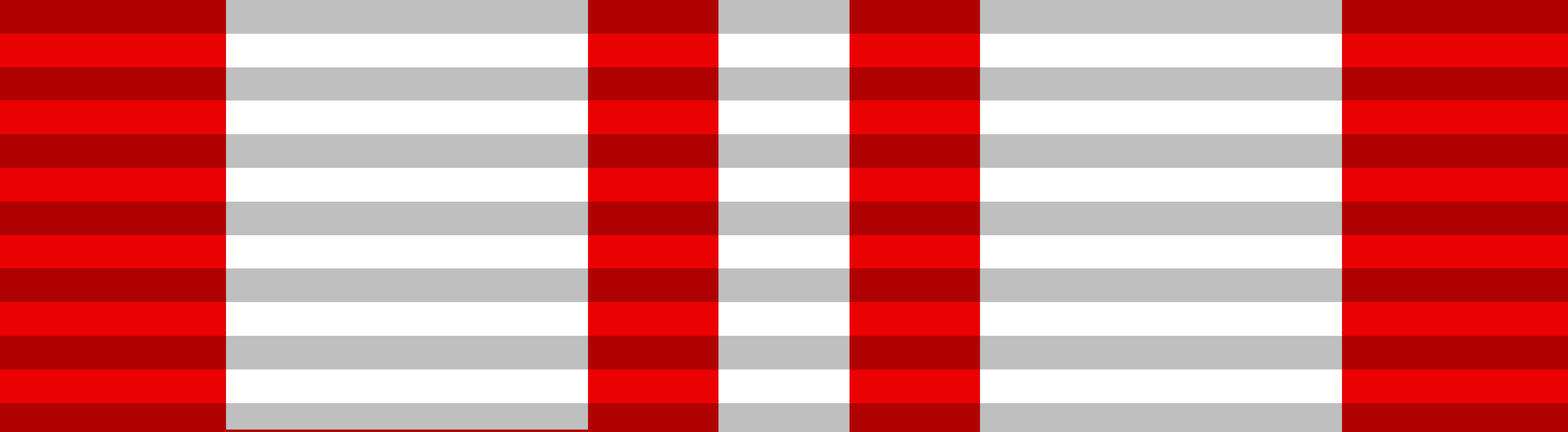

PAF GD(P) Badge RED (More than 3000 Flying Hours)
Sitara-e-Khidmat (SK) (Star of Service)
Tamgha-e-Jang 1965 War (War Medal 1965)	Tamgha-e-Jang 1971 War (War Medal 1971)	Tamgha-e-Qayam-e-Jamhuria (Republic Commemoration Medal) 1956	Legion of Merit (Degree of Commander) USA

== Notes ==
Military offices
Preceded by Zafar Chaudhry	Chief of Air Staff; 1974–1978	Succeeded by Anwar Shamim
Diplomatic posts
Preceded by Jamsheed Marker	Pakistan Ambassador to the United States; 1989–1990	Succeeded by Najmuddin Shaikh
