= Anwar Shamim =

Air Chief Marshal (1931-2013)

Anwar Shamim NI(M) HI(M) SJ SI(M) OI LoM
- ACM Anwar Shamim (1931–2013)

3rd Chief of Air Staff
- In office 23 July 1978 – 5 March 1985
- Preceded by: ACM Zulfiqar Ali Khan
- Succeeded by: ACM Jamal A. Khan
- Vice Chief: Ayaz Ahmed Khan (1979-1981); A. Rashid Shaikh (1981-1984); Jamal A. Khan (1984-1985)

Chairman of Shaheen Foundation
- In office 1982–1988

President of Pakistan Squash Federation
- In office 1985–1988

Personal details
- Born: Mohammad Anwar Shamim; 1 October 1931 Haripur, North-West Frontier Province
- Died: 5 January 2013 (aged 81) CMH Rawalpindi, Punjab, Pakistan
- Cause of death: Catastrophic illness
- Resting place: H-11 Graveyard, Islamabad
- Nickname(s): Shamim; Fire Fighter; M. Anwar Shamim

Military service
- Branch/service: Pakistan Air Force
- Years of service: 1954–1985
- Rank: Air Chief Marshal
- Unit: No. 12 Squadron Globe Trotters (S/No. PAK/ 3657)
- Commands: Missile Guidance Program; Air Force Strategic Command; Southern Air Command; PAF Base Masroor; ACAS (Air Operations) at Air AHQ
- Battles/wars: Indo-Pakistani War of 1965; Aerial operations; Six-Day War; Jordanian Civil War; Indo-Pakistani War of 1971; Soviet–Afghan War
- Awards: Nishan-e-Imtiaz (Military); Hilal-e-Imtiaz (Military); Sitara-e-Jurat; Sitara-e-Imtiaz (Military); Order of Independence; Order of King Abdulaziz; Legion of Merit

Mohammad Anwar Shamim (Note: Urdu: محمد انور شمیم) (1 October 1931 – 4 January 2013) was a former fighter pilot who was the Chief of Air Staff of the Pakistan Air Force, serving in the post from 1978 until retiring in 1985.

Born in Haripur, he was a career fighter pilot who participated in the Indo-Pakistani war of 1965 and also in 1971, before playing a crucial role as a military adviser to Jordan against Palestinian insurgent groups in 1970.

As an Chief of the Air Staff, Shamim is notable for taking initiatives to modernize the PAF by successfully acquiring the General Dynamics F-16 Fighting Falcon from the United States under Project Falcon in 1983, and acquiring radar technology from the US to strengthen his country's aerial defense. During his tenure, he played an influential role in the Zia administration, advising President Muhammad Zia-ul-Haq on policy matters involving the national security of Pakistan.

By mid-1981, rumors of corruption were circulating within the Air Force, including allegations against Shamim. Reportedly, he had purchased a ranch in the United States for $500,000 and "nobody had the courage to inform or question the CAS about this". According to several sources, motivated by loyalty and a strong commitment to integrity, Air Commodore M. M. Alam confronted Shamim directly and recommended that an investigation be conducted. Rather, Shamim authored a negative Annual Confidential Report (ACR) on Alam at the end of the year, questioning his character and combat record, and had him retired.

In addition, Shamim also holds the distinction of being the second longest serving Chief of Air Staff of the Pakistan Air Force. He died in January 2013 and was buried with full state honours.

== Biography ==
=== Early life and education ===
Anwar Shamim was born in Haripur, Hazara District, North-West Frontier Province in the British Indian Empire, on 31 October 1931. He came from an academic family, his parents were teachers at the local school. He received his early education and matriculated from Government College in Campbellpur (Attock) before becoming the member of the University Air Squadron of the Royal Air Force.

In 1950, he joined the RPAF College at Risalpur from where he was selected to attend the Royal Australian Air Force College at Point Cook where he completed the basic flying training course. Upon returning to Pakistan, he gained a commission as a Pilot Officer in No. 12 Squadron Globe Globe Trotters in 1952. Flying Officer Shamim was sent to the United States to be trained to fly the F-104 Starfighter, and was later directed to attend the Air Command and Staff College in Montgomery, Alabama, in the 1960s where he gained degree in Defence studies.

In the 1970s, he went to attend the National Defence University, Pakistan in Islamabad, and attained his master's degree in national security.

=== War and staff appointments in the military ===
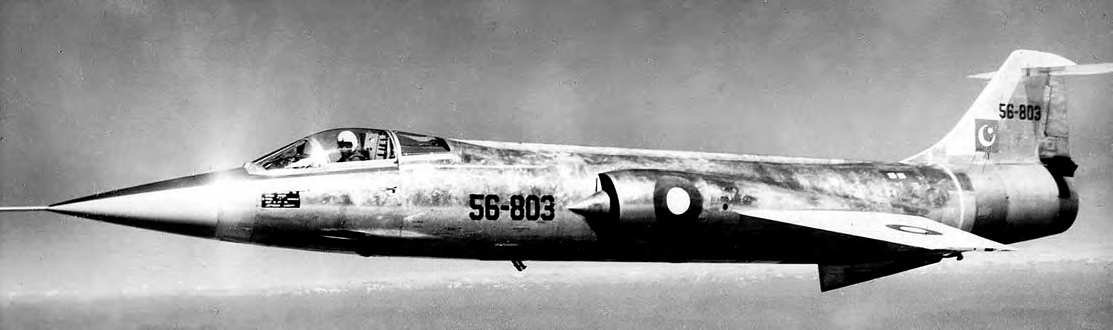
A F-104A in flight in 1963: Wing Commander Shamim commanded the wing against the Indian IAF, leading bombing missions in 1965.

In 1963, Squadron-Leader Shamim took over the command of the No. 11 Squadron Arrows, which he commanded until 1965. While in the United States, he qualified as a test pilot, flying mostly the F-104 and F-86 while performing the combat maneuvering.

In 1965, Wing-Commander (Wg Cdr) Shamim took over the command of No. 33 (Tactical) Wing as its officer commanding, and participated in the Indo-Pakistani war of 1965 with India. During the aerial operations, Shamim flew his Lockheed F-104 Starfighter, along with North American F-86 Sabres against the Indian Air Force's Mikoyan-Gurevich MiG-21. His combat wing led several attacking and bombing missions against the Indian Air Force's attempts for air superiority.

After the war with India, Group Captain (Gp. Capt.) Shamim was posted with the Pakistan Armed Forces–Middle East Command, serving first as an air adviser to the Royal Jordanian Air Force in 1967. He played a crucial role in advising about the importance of air superiority to King Hussain of Jordan during the Six-Day War with Israel. In 1970, acting as a military adviser to the Jordanian Armed Forces, Shamin played a decisive role in gathering military intelligence on the Palestine Liberation Organization (PLO) in support of the Pakistan Armed Forces, led by its Chief of Staff then Brigadier (later President) Muhammad Zia-ul-Haq. His efforts won praise from King Hussain of Jordan, who honoured him with a national decoration.

In 1971, Shamim returned to Pakistan and was appointed as base commander of Masroor Air Force Base, mainly focusing on aerial defence, though he continued directing combat air operations.

In 1974–76, Air Commodore Shamim was appointed Air Officer Commanding of the Southern Air Command, but was later posted as Assistant Chief of the Air Staff (ACAS) Air Operations at the Pakistan Air Headquarters (AHQ) on a two-star rank, Air Vice Marshal (AVM).

In 1978, Shamim was promoted to Air Marshal (AM).

== Chief of Air Staff ==
On 23 July 1978, when ACM Zulfikar Ali Khan completed an extended tenure of four years, Air Commodore Anwar Shamim was promoted to ACM and appointed Chief of the Air Staff.

President Fazal Ilahi approved the elevation of the junior most air officer, Anwar Shamim, to four-star rank, superseding several seniors for this appointment.

Once appointed as Chief of Air Staff, Air Chief Marshal (ACM) Shamim began taking initiatives to modernize the air force by acquiring fighter jets from the United States and China.

Shamim's tenureship was subjected to two extension as a Chief of Air Staff, first in 1982 at the behest of President Zia-ul-Haq to supervise the complete induction of the F-16A/B fighter jets into the PAF. In 1983, ACM Shamim was given another extension as an air chief for two more year. Repeated extension of ACM Shamim as Chief of Air Staff made him the longest serving chief of the air force.

Under his command, the PAF was involved in combat sorties against the Soviet Air Forces in Communist Afghanistan in shooting down the fighter jets violating the airspace of Pakistan only, but he did not authorize the air force's F-16s for hot pursuit missions into Communist Afghanistan.

=== F-16 Fighting Falcon program ===
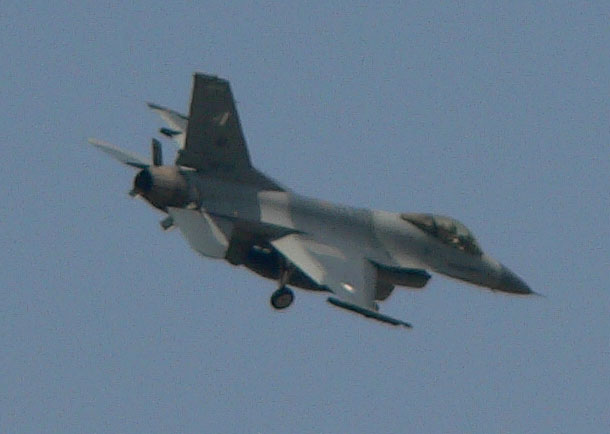
F-16A in flight: ACM Shamim's tenure acquire F-16As from the United States in 1981.

In 1979, ACM Shamim notified President General Zia-ul-Haq that Kahuta's Engineering Research Laboratories (ERL) was an indefensible site because it was at three minutes flying time for the Indian Air Force from the Indo-Pakistani border, while the reaction time for the Pakistan Air Force's fighter jets would be about eight minutes, resulting in the enemy completing the job and returning to their base safely. ACM Shamim explored the idea of defending their nuclear deterrence by suggesting acquiring American F-16s, allowing the PAF to have a second strike capability to destroying the Bhabha Atomic Research Centre at Trombay, India. ACM Shamim refused to acquire Northrop F-5E aircraft from the United States, and provided a strong advocacy for acquiring the F-16s. In 1980, ACM Shamim led successful talks with China, and acquired Shenyang J-6s to be used to protect the facilities.

The Pakistan Ministry of Defence and the United States Department of Defense entered into negotiations to acquire F-16s for the PAF, with Air Chief Marshal Shamim later launching Project Falcon, appointing AVM H. Durrani as its Project-Director.

On 15 January 1983, three F-16As in a single squadron, under the leadership of then-AVM Jamal A. Khan reached Pakistan. When the F-16As arrived, Shamim directed a secret memo to confirm that an Indian attack on the nuclear facilities in Pakistan will be met with retaliatory attack by the PAF, using the F-16s as their primary weapons. During this time, he maintained close relations with Lieutenant General Arnold W. Braswell of the United States Air Force on mutual security issues.

After Israel successfully launched the Operation Opera surprise airstrike on the Iraqi Osirak Nuclear Plant, the fears in Pakistan increased with their intelligence community asserting that India could similarly destroy the nuclear infrastructure in Pakistan. Upon learning of the developments between Iraq and Israel, ACM Shamim tightened the security of the nuclear facilities by establishing the Air Force Strategic Command (AFSC).

In 1980, Air Chief Marshal Shamim also witnessed the commissioning and induction of the A-5 Fantan into the PAF, acquiring the first squadron in 1981.

In 1982, ACM Shamim acquired an additional batch of Dassault Mirage 5 that would provide support in aerial defence for the Pakistan Navy.

=== Air Force Strategic Command ===
After Israel successfully launched its Operation Opera airstrike against Iraqs' Osirak nuclear power plant, fears in Pakistan increased with their intelligence community asserting that India could also destroy the nuclear infrastructure in Pakistan. Upon learning the development between Iraq and Israel, ACM Shamim tightened the security of the nuclear facilities by establishing the Air Force Strategic Command.

The Air Force Strategic Command was primary tasked with protecting and providing aerial defence of the country's clandestine nuclear deterrence. The Air Force Strategic Command later took over satellite operations which ran under the Space Research Commission, providing financial support for developing Badr-1, the nation's first communication satellite.

== Retirement and later life ==
In 1985, ACM Shamim refused to accept an extension as the Chief of Air Staff despite President Zia-ul-Haq approving a third extension. ACM Shamim was eventually succeeded by Air Chief Marshal Jamal Khan, and decided to settle in Islamabad, Pakistan.

In 1986, President Zia appointed Shamin as the High Commissioner of Pakistan to Canada to lead Pakistan's High Commission there, but the Canadian government refused to take his appointment. In 1987, he was then attempted to be sent as a Pakistan Ambassador to Saudi Arabia but this was also refused by Saudi Arabia, citing unknown reasons.

During this time, his strong political advocacy and role in developing the nuclear weapons was exposed by investigative journalism in the United States, leading him to return to Pakistan and sell his home in the US to avoid federal inquires by the United States government. In 1988–89, he joined the Dawn, writing and penning articles on security issues in Afghanistan.

In 1999–2000, Shamim was implicated in several allegations in the corruption inquires conducted by National Accountability Bureau (NAB) but details of his assets were then marked as classified by President Pervez Musharraf.

In 2010, he wrote and published his memoirs, Cutting Edge, recounting his memories during this tenureship as an air chief.

== Death and State funeral ==
On 3 January 2013, Shamim was admitted to the Combined Military Hospital Rawalpindi and died on 4 January 2013 after a prolonged illness. His death was widely reported and, it was announced by the Government of Pakistan to give him the proper burial with state honors.

Shamim was given a state funeral that was attended by Air Chief Marshal Tahir Rafiq, then-air chief, Admiral Asif Sandila, then-navy chief, Gen. Ashfaq Parvez Kayani, then-army chief, former air chiefs, war veterans, diplomatics, and other dignitaries. President Asif Zardari paid tribute to Shamins' services for the nation and prayed to Allah, the Almighty, to rest the departed soul in eternal peace and to give courage to the bereaved family to bear this loss with fortitude.

Anwar Shamim is buried in H-11 Graveyard, Islamabad; a granite memorial crowned by the Pakistan Air Force emblem marks his grave.

== Legacy ==
ACM Anwar Shamim was noted as the second longest serving chief of air staff, commanding the air force for nearly seven years whose tenureship saw the induction of the F-16s in the air force. While there were several allegations of nepotism and improper conduct, But this has been fervently denied by his family

ACM Anwar Shamim started the air force's exercise that were integrated with the other branches of the Pakistani military in the 1980s for the leadership under Chairman joint chiefs to understand and appreciate exactly what the PAF could and could not do.

== Awards and decorations ==
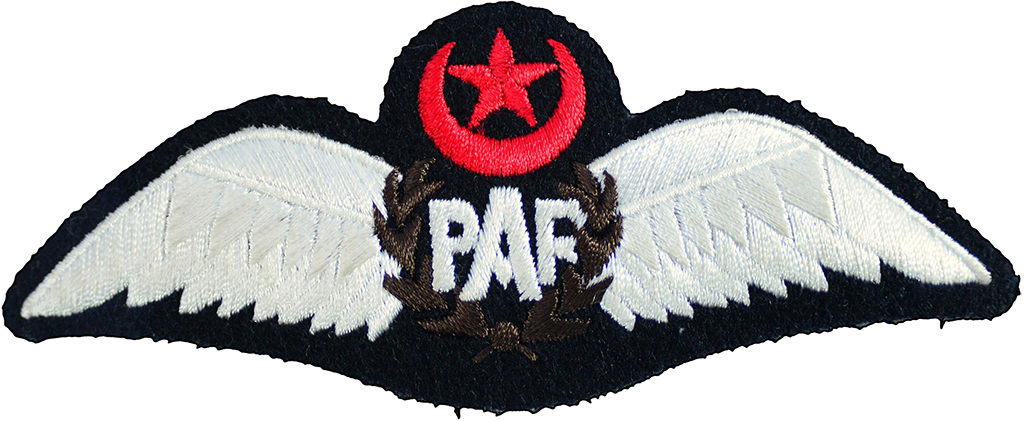

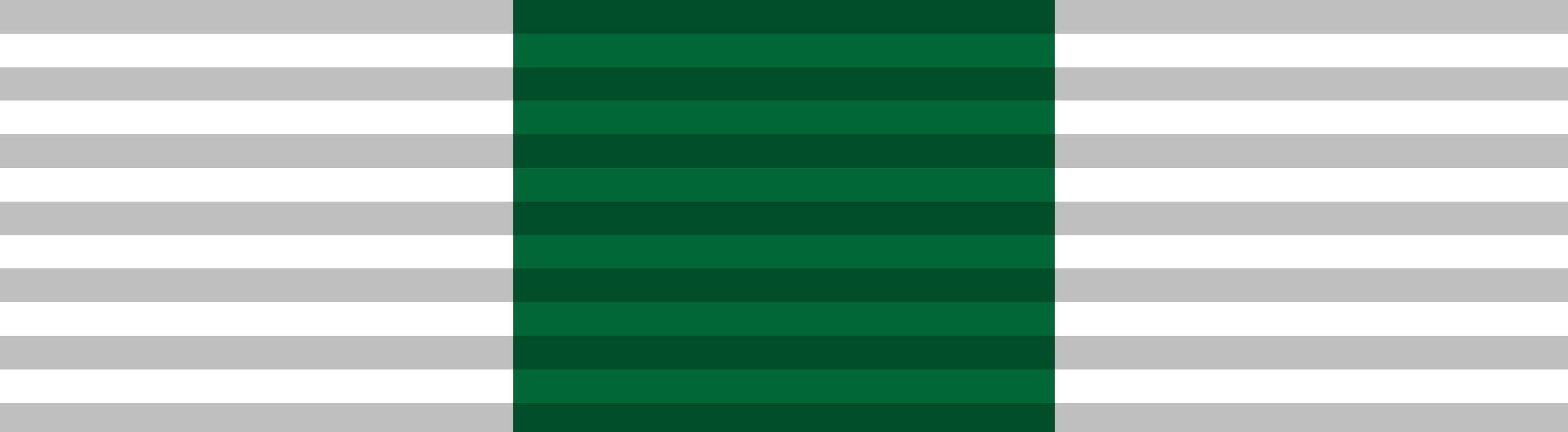

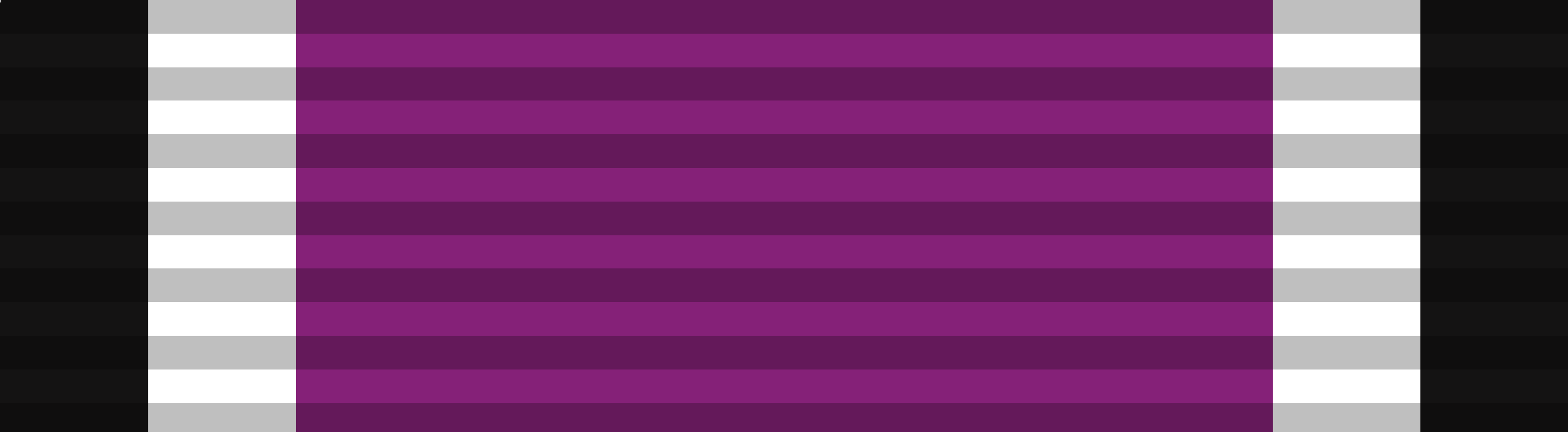

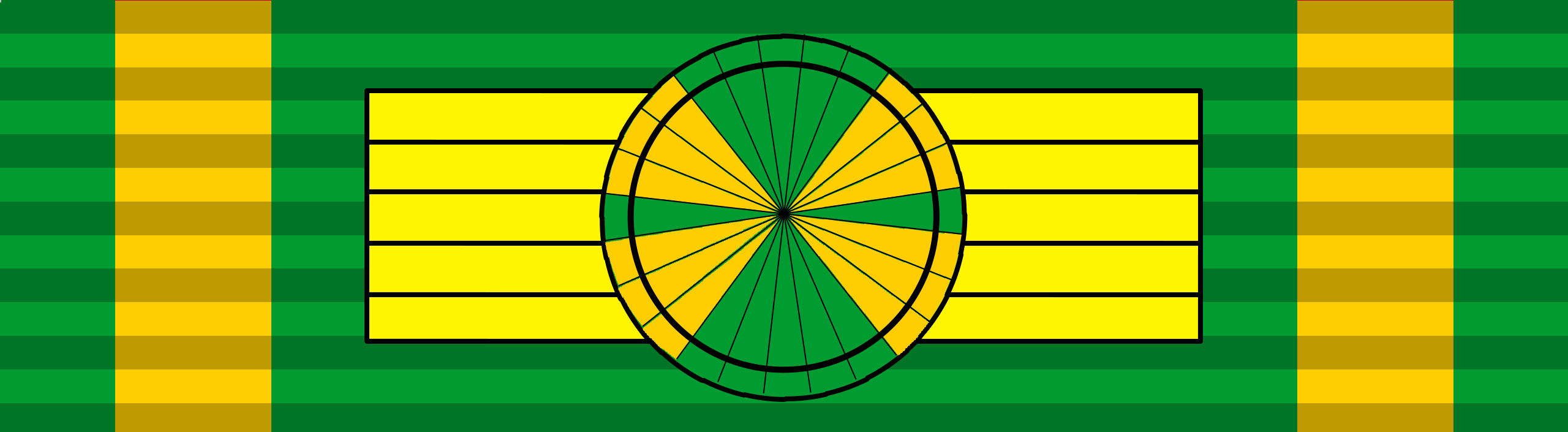

PAF GD(P) Badge RED (More than 3000 Flying Hours)
Nishan-e-Imtiaz (Military) (Order of Excellence)	Hilal-e-Imtiaz (Military) (Crescent of Excellence)		Sitara-e-Jurat (Star of Courage) 1965 War
Sitara-e-Imtiaz (Military) (Star of Excellence)	Tamgha-e-Diffa (General Service Medal): 1. 1965 War Clasp; 2. 1971 War Clasp	Sitara-e-Harb 1965 War (War Star 1965)	Sitara-e-Harb 1971 War (War Star 1971)
Tamgha-e-Jang 1965 War (War Medal 1965)	Tamgha-e-Jang 1971 War (War Medal 1971)	Tamgha-e-Sad Saala Jashan-e- Wiladat-e-Quaid-e-Azam (100th Birth Anniversary of Muhammad Ali Jinnah) 1976	Tamgha-e-Jamhuria (Republic Commemoration Medal) 1956
Hijri Tamgha (Hijri Medal) 1979	Order of Independence (Wisam al-Istiqlal) (Jordan)	Order of King Abdul Aziz (1st Class) (Saudi Arabia)	The Legion of Merit (Degree of Commander) (USA)

=== Foreign Decorations ===
Foreign Awards
Jordan	Order of Independence (Wisam al-Istiqlal)
Saudi Arabia	Order of King Abdul Aziz - Class I
USA	The Legion of Merit (Degree of Commander)

== Published works ==
- Shamim, PAF`, ACM (Gen.) M. Anwar (12 March 1988). "Afghanistan Problem: The End in Sight? Part-I". M. A. Shamim, PAF. Islamabad: M. Anwar Shamim at Dawn. Dawn Newspapers.
- Shamim, PAF`, ACM (Gen.) M. Anwar (13 March 1988). "Afghanistan Problem: The End in Sight? Part-II". M. A. Shamim, PAF. Islamabad: M. Anwar Shamim at Dawn. Dawn Newspapers.
- Shamim, PAF`, ACM (Gen.) M. Anwar (27 March 1988). "Implications of India's Naval Build-up". M. A. Shamim, PAF. Islamabad: M. Anwar Shamim at Dawn. Dawn Newspapers.
- Shamim, PAF`, ACM (Gen.) M. Anwar (4 April 1989). "Dilemma of the Bureaucracy". M. A. Shamim, PAF. Islamabad: M. Anwar Shamim at Dawn. Dawn Newspapers.
- Shamim, PAF`, ACM (Gen.) M. Anwar (20 May 1989). "What Does Agni Port End?". M. A. Shamim, PAF. Islamabad: M. Anwar Shamim at Dawn. Dawn Newspapers.

=== Memoirs ===
- Shamim, M. Anwar (2010). Cutting Edge PAF: A Former Air Chief's Reminiscences of a Developing Air Force (1st ed.). Islamabad: Vanguard Books. p. 351. ISBN 978-9694025407.

== See also ==
- Pakistan Air Force

== Notes ==
Military offices
Preceded by Zulfiqar Ali Khan	Chief of Air Staff; 1978–1985	Succeeded by Jamal A. Khan
