= Chief of the Air Staff (Pakistan) =

Highest ranking 4-star rank officer in the Pakistan Air Force

- رئیسِ عملۂ پاک فضائیہ
- Air Force Ensign of Pakistan

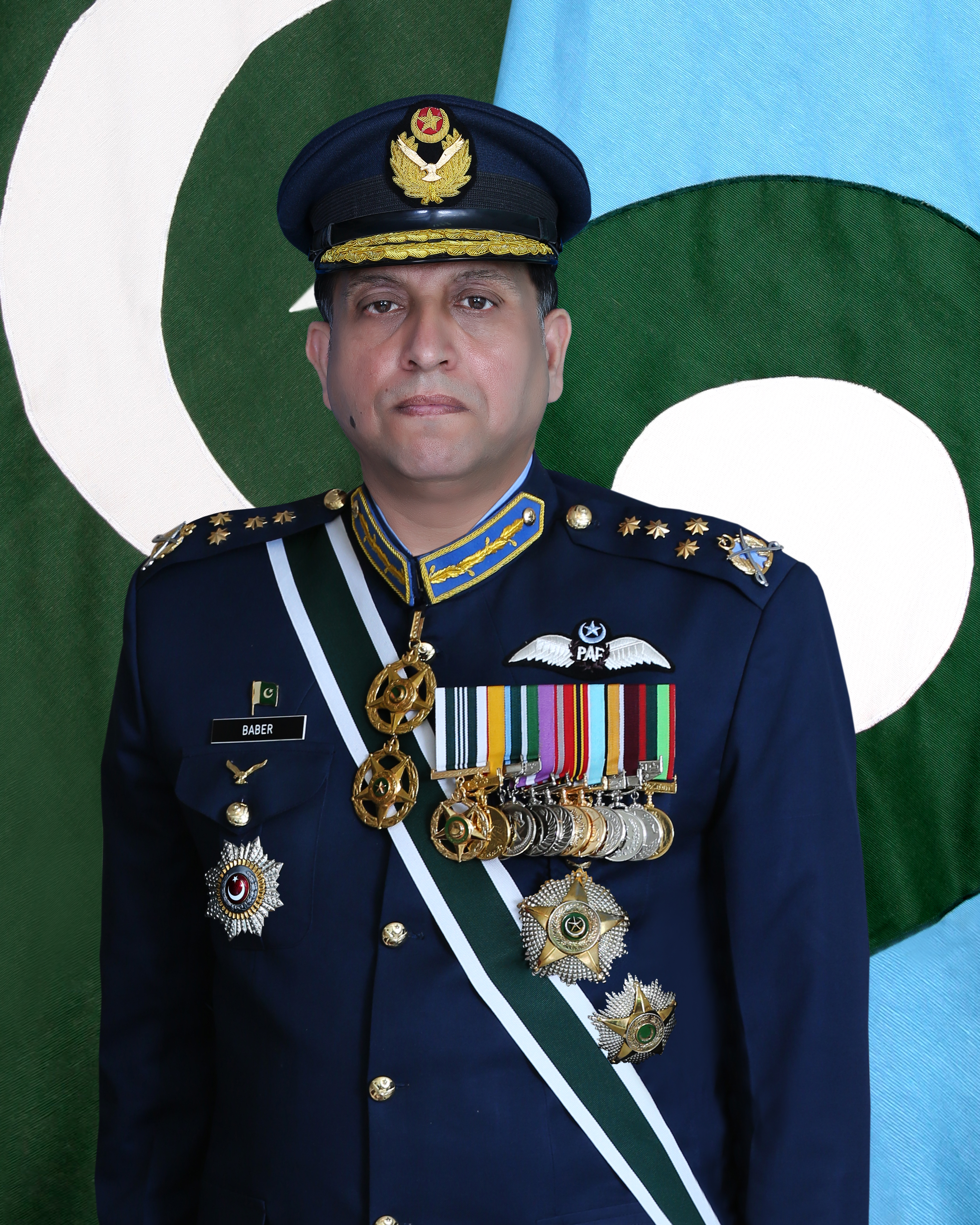
- Incumbent; Air Chief Marshal; Zaheer Ahmad Babar since 19 March 2021
- Ministry of Defence (Air Force Secretariat-II at MoD); Pakistan Air Force
- Abbreviation: CAS
- Member of: Joint Chiefs of Staff Committee; National Security Council
- Reports to: Prime Minister of Pakistan; Minister of Defence
- Seat: Air Headquarters
- Nominator: Prime Minister of Pakistan
- Appointer: President of Pakistan
- Term length: 5 years Renewable
- Precursor: Air Officer Commanding (1947-1950); Commander-in-Chief (1950-1972)
- Formation: 3 March 1972; 54 years ago
- First holder: Air Marshal Zafar Chaudhry
- Unofficial names: Air chief
- Deputy: Vice Chief of the Air Staff
- Salary: According to Pakistan Military officer's Pay Grade (apex Scale)
- Website: Official Website

The Chief of the Air Staff (Note: Urdu: سربراہ پاک فضائيہ) (reporting name: CAS) is a senior Pakistani military appointment and a statutory office held by an Air Chief Marshal in the Pakistan Air Force, who is appointed by the prime minister of Pakistan with final confirmation by the president of Pakistan. The CAS is the highest-ranking officer of the air force.

Until 2025, the Chief of the Air Staff was also a senior member of the Joint Chiefs of Staff Committee in a separate capacity and usually provided necessary consultation to the erstwhile Chairman Joint Chiefs of Staff Committee to act as a principal military adviser to the prime minister and its civilian government in the line of defending and guarding the nation's airspace and aerial borders.

The Chief of the Air Staff exercises his responsibility of command and control of the operational, administration, combatant, logistics, and training commands within the Air Force.

Since 1985, the appointment, in principle, was constitutionally subjected for three years. However, in March 2024, the incumbent chief was controversially given a one year extension in his tenure. In November 2024, the term length was increased to five years. The Chief of the Air Staff is based at the Air Headquarters, and the current chief is Air Chief Marshal Zaheer Ahmad Babar.

== History ==
In 1957, the Government of Pakistan appointed Air Vice Marshal Asghar Khan, who became the first native Commander-in-Chief. On 20 March 1972, the title of the office was changed to Chief of Air Staff with Air Marshal Zafar Chaudhry being appointed as the first officer to hold the title. The Air Force had its first four-star rank officer, Air Chief Marshal Zulfiqar Ali Khan, in 1974. The term of the superannuation was then constrained to three years in the office as opposed to four years and air chief was made a permanent member of Joint Chiefs of Staff Committee. Since 1974, all air chiefs have been four-star rank air force officers.

The Chief of the Air Staff is nominated and appointed by the prime minister whose appointment is then confirmed by the president. The air force leadership is based in the AHQ (PAF) in Islamabad, at the vicinity of the Naval Headquarters.

The Chief of the Air Staff leads the functions of the AHQ, assisted by the civilians from the Air Force Secretariat-II of the Ministry of Defence (MoD). The Chief of the Air Staff exercise its responsibility of complete operational, training and logistics commands. In addition, the air chief has several staff officers:-

- Vice Chief of the Air Staff
  - Deputy Chiefs of the Air Staff
    - Deputy Chief of The Air Staff (Operations) — DCAS(O)
    - Deputy Chief of The Air Staff (Engineering) — DCAS(E)
    - Deputy Chief of The Air Staff (Administration) — DCAS(A)
    - Deputy Chief of The Air Staff (Training) — DCAS(T)
    - Deputy Chief of The Air Staff (Personnel) — DCAS(P)
    - Deputy Chief of The Air Staff (Support) — DCAS(S)
    - Inspector General Air Force — IGAF
    - Chief Project Director JF-17 Thunder — CPD JF-17 Thunder
    - Director General Air Force Strategic Command — DG AFSC
    - Director General Air Intelligence — DG AI
    - Director General Command, Control, Communication, Computers and Intelligence — DG C4ISTAR
    - Director General Projects — DG Projects
    - Director General Security — DG Security

== Appointees ==
The following tables chronicle the appointees to the office of the Chief of the Air Staff or its preceding positions since the independence of Pakistan.

(**Seconded from the Royal Air Force)

=== Air Officer Commanding of the Royal Pakistan Air Force (1947–50) ===
No.	Portrait	Air Officer Commanding	Took office	Left office	Time in office
1	Allan Perry-KeeneCB OBE	Air Vice Marshal; Allan Perry-Keene; CB OBE (1898–1987)	15 August 1947	17 February 1949	1 year, 186 days
2	Richard AtcherleyCB CBE AFC	Air Vice Marshal; Richard Atcherley; CB CBE AFC (1904–1970)	18 February 1949	30 March 1950	1 year, 40 days

=== Commander-in-Chief of the Royal Pakistan Air Force (1950-56) ===
No.	Portrait	Commander-in-Chief	Took office	Left office	Time in office
1	Richard AtcherleyCB CBE AFC	Air Vice Marshal; Richard Atcherley; CB CBE AFC (1904–1970)	31 March 1950	6 May 1951	1 year, 36 days
2	Leslie William CannonCB CBE	Air Vice Marshal; Leslie William Cannon; CB CBE (1904–1986)	7 May 1951	19 June 1955	4 years, 43 days
3	Arthur McDonaldCB AFC	Air Vice Marshal; Arthur McDonald; CB AFC (1903–1996)	20 June 1955	23 March 1956	277 days

=== Commander-in-Chief of the Pakistan Air Force (1956–72) ===
Pakistan became an Islamic republic on 23 March 1956, hence royal was dropped from the name of the air force.

No.	Portrait	Commander-in-Chief	Took office	Left office	Time in office
1	Arthur McDonaldCB AFC	Air Vice Marshal; Arthur McDonald; CB AFC (1903–1996)	23 March 1956	22 July 1957	1 year, 121 days
2	Asghar KhanHPk HQA	Air Marshal; Asghar Khan; HPk HQA (1921–2018)	23 July 1957	22 July 1965	7 years, 364 days
3	Nur KhanHJ SPk HQA	Air Marshal; Nur Khan; HJ SPk HQA (1923–2011)	23 July 1965	31 August 1969	4 years, 40 days
4	Abdur Rahim KhanHJ HQA SPk SK SBt KSJ	Air Marshal; Abdur Rahim Khan; HJ HQA SPk SK SBt KSJ (1925–1990)	1 September 1969	2 March 1972	2 years, 183 days

=== Chiefs of Air Staff of Pakistan Air Force (1972–present) ===
Rank insignia of the whole PAF was changed when ACM Tanvir Mahmood Ahmed was in the office.

No.	Portrait	Chief of Air Staff	Took office	Left office	Time in office
1	Zafar ChaudhrySQA	Air Marshal; Zafar Chaudhry; SQA (1926–2019)	3 March 1972	15 April 1974	2 years, 43 days
2	Zulfiqar Ali KhanSK LOM	Air Chief Marshal; Zulfiqar Ali Khan; SK LOM (1930–2005)	16 April 1974	22 July 1978	4 years, 97 days
3	Anwar ShamimNI(M) SJ	Air Chief Marshal; Anwar Shamim; NI(M) SJ (1931–2013)	23 July 1978	5 March 1985	6 years, 225 days
4	Jamal A. KhanNI(M) SJ SBt	Air Chief Marshal; Jamal A. Khan; NI(M) SJ SBt (born 1934)	6 March 1985	8 March 1988	3 years, 2 days
5	Hakimullah Khan DurraniNI(M) SJ SBt	Air Chief Marshal; Hakimullah Khan Durrani; NI(M) SJ SBt (1935–2024)	9 March 1988	9 March 1991	3 years
6	Farooq Feroze Khan NI(M) SBt	Air Chief Marshal; Farooq Feroze Khan NI(M) SBt (1939–2021)	9 March 1991	8 November 1994	3 years, 244 days
7	Abbas Khattak NI(M) SBt	Air Chief Marshal; Abbas Khattak NI(M) SBt (born 1943)	8 November 1994	7 November 1997	2 years, 364 days
8	Pervaiz Mehdi QureshiNI(M) SBt	Air Chief Marshal; Pervaiz Mehdi Qureshi; NI(M) SBt (born 1943)	7 November 1997	20 November 2000	3 years, 13 days
9	Mushaf Ali MirNI(M) SBt	Air Chief Marshal; Mushaf Ali Mir; NI(M) SBt (1947–2003)	20 November 2000	20 February 2003 †	2 years, 92 days
–	Syed Qaiser Hussain	Air Marshal; Syed Qaiser Hussain; Acting	20 February 2003	18 March 2003	26 days
10	Kaleem SaadatNI(M)	Air Chief Marshal; Kaleem Saadat; NI(M) (born 1951)	19 March 2003	18 March 2006	2 years, 364 days
11	Tanvir Mahmood AhmedNI(M) SBt	Air Chief Marshal; Tanvir Mahmood Ahmed; NI(M) SBt (born 1952)	18 March 2006	18 March 2009	3 years, 0 days
12	Rao Qamar SulemanNI(M) HI(M) SI(M) TI(M) SBt	Air Chief Marshal; Rao Qamar Suleman; NI(M) HI(M) SI(M) TI(M) SBt (born 1954)	19 March 2009	19 March 2012	3 years, 0 days
13	Tahir Rafique ButtNI(M) TBt	Air Chief Marshal; Tahir Rafique Butt; NI(M) TBt (born 1955)	19 March 2012	19 March 2015	3 years, 0 days
14	Sohail AmanNI(M) HI(M) SI(M) TI(M)	Air Chief Marshal; Sohail Aman; NI(M) HI(M) SI(M) TI(M) (born 1959)	19 March 2015	19 March 2018	3 years, 0 days
15	Mujahid Anwar KhanNI(M) HI(M) SI(M) TI(M)	Air Chief Marshal; Mujahid Anwar Khan; NI(M) HI(M) SI(M) TI(M) (born 1962)	19 March 2018	19 March 2021	3 years, 0 days
16	Zaheer Ahmad BabarNI(M) HI(M) SI(M) TI(M)	Air Chief Marshal; Zaheer Ahmad Babar; NI(M) HI(M) SI(M) TI(M) (born 1965)	19 March 2021	Incumbent	5 years, 172 days

== See also ==
- List of serving air marshals of the Pakistan Air Force
- Pakistan Air Force ranks
- Chairman Joint Chiefs of Staff Committee (Pakistan)
- Chief of the Army Staff (Pakistan)
- Chief of the Naval Staff (Pakistan)
- Chief of the General Staff (Pakistan)
