= Zafar Chaudhry =

Pakistani air force officer

Zafar Ahmad Chaudhry SQA
- ظفراحمد چودھری

1st Chief of Air Staff Pakistan Air Force
- In office 3 March 1972 – 15 April 1974
- Deputy: Eric G. Hall (1972); Saeedullah Khan (1972-1973); Chaudhary Rab Nawaz (1973-1974)
- Preceded by: Office Established (Commander-in-Chief, Air Marshal Abdur Rahim Khan)
- Succeeded by: Zulfiqar Ali Khan

Managing Director of Pakistan International Airlines
- In office 1971 – 2 March 1972

Personal details
- Born: Zafar Ahmad Chaudhry; 19 August 1926 Sialkot, Punjab, British India
- Died: 17 December 2019 (aged 93) Lahore, Pakistan

Military service
- Branch/service: Royal Indian Air Force; Pakistan Air Force
- Years of service: 1945–1974
- Rank: Air Marshal
- Unit: No. 7 Squadron, RIAF (S/No. RIAF. 3095)
- Commands: Pakistan Air Force Academy; PAF Base Sargodha; ACAS (Air Operations); No. 38 (Tactical) Wing
- Battles/wars: Indo-Pakistani War of 1965; Indo-Pakistani War of 1971
- Awards: Sitara-e-Quaid-e-Azam

Zafar Ahmad Chaudhry (Note: Urdu: ظفر احمد چودھری) (19 August 1926 – 17 December 2019) was a Pakistani former airline executive, three-star rank officer, and human rights activist who served as the first Chief of Air Staff of the Pakistan Air Force, appointed by President Zulfikar Ali Bhutto in 1972 and resigned in 1974.

== Early life and education ==
Zafar Ahmad Chaudhry was born in Sialkot, Punjab, British India on 19 August 1926 to a Punjabi Kahlon Jatt family belonging to the Ahmadiyya Muslim Community.

He enrolled at the Punjab University in Lahore, and graduated with bachelor's degree in 1944, and then joined the Royal Indian Air Force.

== Military career ==
=== Early career and training (1945–1950s) ===
In 1945, Chaudhry was commissioned in the Royal Indian Air Force as a pilot officer, and was inducted in No. 7 Squadron in 1946. After the partition of India, he subsequently went to join the Royal Pakistan Air Force, and qualified as an instructor on the North American T-6G Harvard. He was further educated at the RAF Staff College in Andover, Hampshire, in the United Kingdom before being directed to attend the Joint Service Defence College of the British Army. He later secured his qualification from the Imperial Defence College before returning to Pakistan.

=== Operational roles and command appointments (1960s) ===
In 1965, Air Commodore Chaudhry served in the Air Headquarters as a Director Air Operations, taking responsibility for planning combat aerial operations against the Indian Air Force during the second war with India. In 1969, Chaudhry was appointed station commander of the PAF Station Sargodha.

=== Secondment and civil aviation role (1971–1972) ===
In 1971, Air Vice-Marshal Chaudhry was sent on secondment and was appointed managing director of the Pakistan International Airlines, which he directed until 1972.

=== Chief of Air Staff and reforms (1972–1974) ===
On 3 April 1972, Air Marshal Chaudhry was appointed first Chief of Air Staff and took over the command of the Pakistan Air Force. In 1973, he authorised the Air Intelligence to conduct inquiries for the court-martial of several senior air force officers for their alleged political role in de-stabilising the civilian government.

This decision sparked controversy between the Air Force and the civilian government. Eventually, the decision was reversed upon being determined that the investigation was opened for inappropriate reasons, allowing the alleged officers to continue their military service in 1974. Upon learning of this development, Chaudhry immediately tendered his resignation.

== Resignation and later life ==
Not known for affluence he took a job in USA selling cars. Later he joined Mr. Babar Ali in Lahore to look after WWF in Pakistan.

Chaudhry was the last air marshal to command the Air Force, and was succeeded by Zulfiqar Ali Khan, the air force's first four-star rank officer. After his retirement, Chaudhry became an activist, returned to Pakistan, and was one of the founding members of the Human Rights Commission of Pakistan in the 1980s, subsequently serving on its council.

On 17 December 2019, Chaudhry died of cardiac arrest, aged 93, in Lahore, Pakistan.

== In popular culture ==
He is portrayed by Ajay Mehra in the 2026 Indian film Border 2, which is based on various engagements during the Indo-Pakistani War of 1971 including Operation Chengiz Khan by the PAF.

== Books ==
- Mosaic of Memory: A Personal Narrative, 1985. Memoirs.
- Miracles Do Happen, 1988. Memoirs.
- Plaint And Response, 2012. Translation of Urdu poetry from Muhammaq Iqbal, Shikwa and Jawab-e-Shikwa.

== Awards and decorations ==
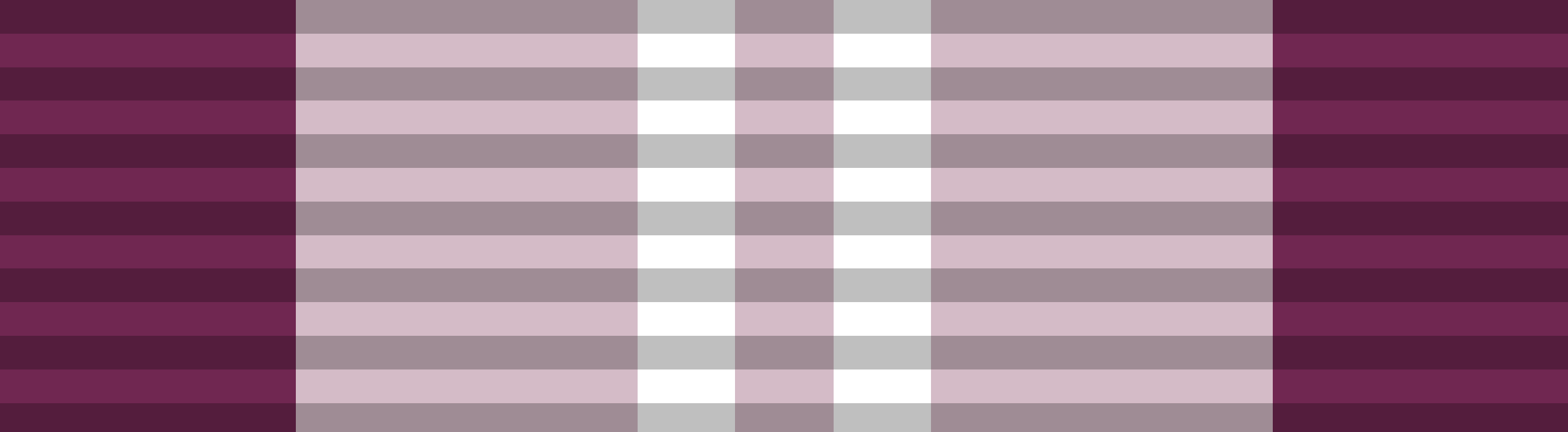

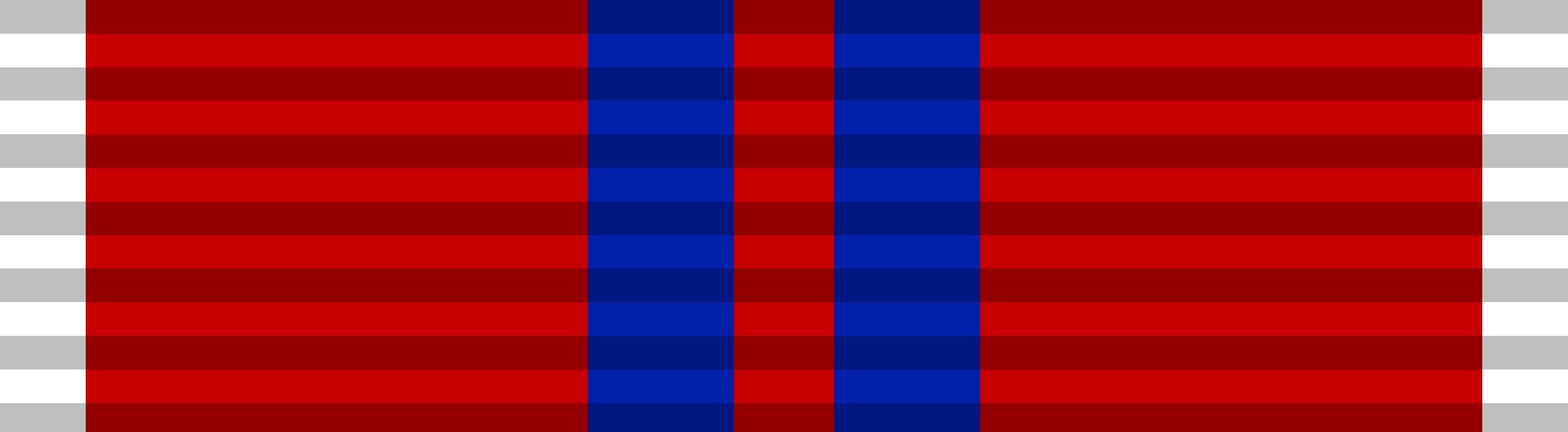

Sitara-e-Quaid-e-Azam (SQA)	Tamgha-e-Diffa (General Service Medal)	Sitara-e-Harb 1965 War (War Star 1965)	Tamgha-e-Jang 1965 War (War Medal 1965)
Pakistan Tamgha (Pakistan Medal) 1947	Tamgha-e-Jamhuria (Republic Commemoration Medal) 1956	War Medal 1939-1945	Queen Elizabeth II Coronation Medal (1953)

=== Foreign Decorations ===
Foreign Awards
UK	War Medal 1939-1945
UK	Queen Elizabeth II Coronation Medal

== Notes ==
Military offices
Preceded by Abdul Rahim Khan	Chief of Air Staff; 1972 – 1974	Succeeded by Zulfiqar Ali Khan
