= Abdur Rahim Khan =

4th Pakistani Air Chief (1925-1990)

Abdur Rahim Khan HJ HQA SPk SBt
- عبدالرحیم خان
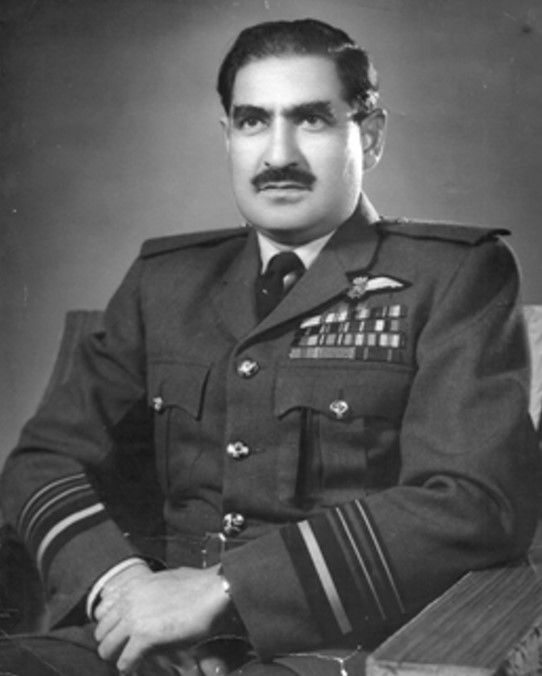
- Official military portrait, 1969

4th Commander-in-Chief Pakistan Air Force
- In office 1 September 1969 – 2 March 1972
- President: General Yahya Khan; Zulfikar Ali Bhutto
- Deputy: Khyber Khan (1969-1970); S. A. Yusaf (1969-1970); Eric G. Hall (1970-1972)
- Preceded by: Air Marshal Nur Khan
- Succeeded by: Air Marshal Zafar Chaudhry (as Chief of Air Staff)

Ambassador of Pakistan to Spain
- In office 11 May 1972 – 13 April 1977
Other positions
Assistant Chief of Air Staff (Administration)
In office June 1968 – 31 August 1969
4th Commandant PAF Staff College
In office May 1966 – June 1968
Assistant Chief of Air Staff (Operations)
In office November 1964 – May 1966
Officer Commanding PAF Station Mauripur
In office December 1959 – December 1961
Succeeded by	FS Hussain
Officer Commanding No. 11 Squadron PAF
In office 12 June 1951 – April 1953
Succeeded by	FS Hussain
Officer Commanding No. 9 Squadron PAF
In office July 1950 – September 1950

Personal details
- Born: 25 October 1925 Rawalpindi, British India
- Died: 28 February 1990 (aged 64) Potomac, Maryland, U.S.
- Cause of death: Heart failure
- Spouse: Princess Mehrunissa Khan (m. 1962; died 2025)
- Children: 2
- Relatives: Raza Ali Khan of Rampur (father-in-law)
- Education: RAF Central Flying School; No. 1 (I) SFTS; Fighter Leaders' School, Mauripur; RAF Staff College, Andover; Imperial Defence College

Military service
- Branch/service: Royal Indian Air Force (1943-1947); Pakistan Air Force (1947-1972)
- Years of service: 1943–1972
- Rank: Air Marshal
- Unit: No. 7 Squadron RIAF (1943-1947)
- Commands: Pakistan Air Force; PAF Staff College; PAF Station Mauripur; No. 11 Squadron PAF; No. 9 Squadron PAF
- Battles/wars: World War II; Burma campaign; Waziristan rebellion (1948-1954); Indo-Pakistani War of 1965; Indo-Pakistani Air War of 1965; Indo-Pakistani War of 1971; Operation Chengiz Khan
- Awards: See list

Abdur Rahim Khan (Note: Urdu: عبدالرحیم خان; Sometimes spelled Abdul Rahim Khan) (25 October 1925 — 28 February 1990) secretly referred to as Shan'tay Khan by subordinates, (Note: Pilots secretly referred to him as "Shan'tay Khan," because of his frequent use of the word "shan't" when reprimanding officers. One pilot recalled several occasions when Squadron Leader Khan would say, "You shan't break the 200-foot low-flying limit; you shan't forget to learn your emergency procedures by heart; you shan't ever give me a lame excuse, you shan't get bad gunnery scores... because then, you shall be banished from this squadron.") was a Pakistani former fighter pilot, three-star rank air officer, and diplomat, who served as the fourth and last Commander-in-Chief of the Pakistan Air Force from 1969 to 1972. After his retirement, he served as Pakistan's Ambassador to Spain until his resignation in 1977.

Along with Chief of General Staff Gul Hassan Khan, Abdur Rahim Khan is seen by many as playing a major part in forcing President Yahya Khan to resign in the aftermath of the India–Pakistan war of 1971. This action was facilitated by a letter drafted by Brigadier F.B. Ali who threatened to stage a coup if power was not handed over to civilian rule after Pakistan had lost the war and its territory of East Pakistan. Abdur Rahim Khan subsequently dispatched an aircraft to Rome to bring Zulfikar Ali Bhutto back to Pakistan promising him protection should President Yahya carry out any wrong move. Air Marshal Khan facilitated his rise to power and is widely viewed as a kingmaker in Bhutto's ascent.

== Early life ==
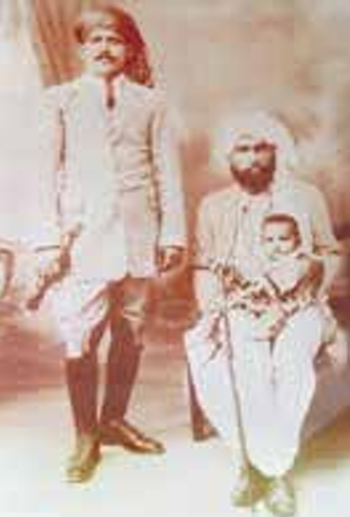
Abdur Rahim Khan as a child, sitting in the lap of his father, Risaldar Karam Baksh, while Khan's uncle stands by their side, 1925

Abdur Rahim Khan was born in the neighbourhood of Morgah in Rawalpindi on 25 October 1925 or 25 July 1925, into a Punjabi Gujjar family. His father, Karam Baksh Azim was a Risaldar in the British Indian Army.

In 1943, Khan graduated from Nowrosjee Wadia College and joined the Royal Indian Air Force.

== Personal life ==
While attending the Imperial Defence College on a staff course as a Group Captain in 1962, Khan met Princess of Rampur Mehrunissa. Abdur Rahim Khan went to Air Marshal Asghar Khan and threatened to resign unless President Ayub Khan lifted the prohibition on Pakistanis marrying Indians. Asghar Khan, who met with President Ayub, said that Abdur Rahim Khan had a brilliant career ahead of him and argued that the PAF could not afford to lose such an officer. He also noted that Abdur Rahim had never been married before. After taking into consideration what Asghar Khan said, President Ayub Khan enacted a special law granting Mehrunissa a visa. Abdur Rahim Khan married Mehrunissa in March 1962.

This was her second marriage and she had two children from her previous marriage. Mehrunissa had two children with Khan, a daughter Mariam, born on 11 October 1964 and a son, Abid, born in 1965. Abid died in a car accident, sometime after his father's death.

== Service years ==
=== Royal Indian Air Force (1944-1947) ===
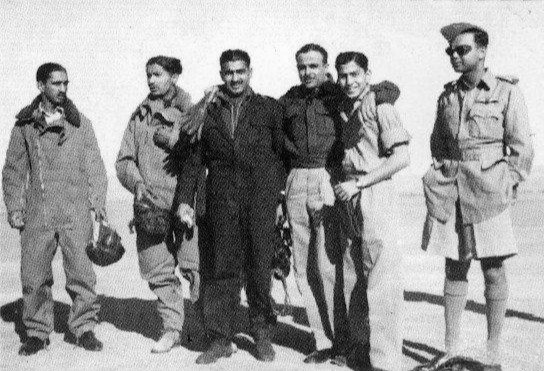
From left: Nur Khan, Asghar Khan, Abdur Rahim Khan, Om Prakash Mehra, Minoo Merwan Engineer, and an unidentified officer, 1944

Abdur Rahim Khan was commissioned into the Royal Indian Air Force on 5 June 1944, after initial flight training with various flying units such as Secunderabad, Jodhpur and Ambala. He was later assigned to No. 7 Sqn, based in Imphal, under squadron commander Pratap Chandra Lal. Khan took part in combat in World War II on the Burma front, fighting against the Japanese. He later received the Burma Star for his service. (Note: The promulgation of Wartime Campaign Awards usually took time to process. His Burma Star decoration was formally confirmed in 1954.)

Khan attended the 95th Course of the RAF Central Flying School from 1 August 1946 to 30 November 1946 and was promoted to Flying Officer.

=== Pakistan Air Force ===
After the Partition of British India in August 1947, Flying Officer Abdur Rahim Khan opted for the Royal Pakistan Air Force. As one of its pioneer officers, he was part of the team that assisted Wing Commander Asghar Khan in establishing the RPAF Flying Training School and was appointed as a flying instructor at the school on 5 September.

On 6 September 1947, the first contingent of training aircraft arrived in Risalpur from Ambala which consisted of six Harvards. They were flown in by flying instructors Flight Lieutenants Khyber Khan, S. A. Aziz, and Flying Officers Abdur Rahim Khan and Zafar Chaudhry. The last two were flown in by acting Pilot Officers Suleman Soni Afzal and S. M. "Lanky" Ahmad.

At an air show in Lahore on 21 March 1948 which was held to promote the Air Force amongst the public, Flight Lieutenants Abdul Naeem Aziz and Abdur Rahim Khan, and Flying Officers Masroor Hosain and FS Hussain took part in the formation.

Squadron Leader Abdur Rahim Khan was appointed Officer Commanding No. 9 Sqn in February 1949 and returned to the same command from July 1950 to September 1950. In June 1951, he commanded No. 11 Sqn until April 1953.

While serving on a tour to the United States in 1952, he became the first Pakistani pilot to fly at Supersonic speed. Wing Commander Abdur Rahim Khan became the first Commander of No. 32 Wing in August 1956. Later that year in December 1956, as a Group Captain, he was appointed Station Commander of PAF Station Mauripur.

In November 1964, Khan was promoted to Air Commodore and appointed Assistant Chief of Air Staff (ACAS) (Operations).

==== 1965 War ====
On 18 September 1965, Air Commodore Abdur Rahim Khan led a formation of F-86 Sabres of the No. 19 Sqn and conducted a strike on an Indian Army convoy near the Indian Air Force's Srinagar airfield at 1500 hours. All four aircraft returned safely to Peshawar.

All PAF stations were put on high alert in anticipation of a potential attack by the Indian Air Force, which led Pakistan to focus significantly on air defence. Approximately 40% of the PAF's fighter aircraft were initially reserved for this purpose. This effort was directed by Air Commodore Masroor Hosain, who was in charge of air defence at the Air Headquarters in Rawalpindi. The remaining F-86 Sabres were managed by the (ACAS) Operations, Air Commodore Abdur Rahim Khan. Both officers were directly accountable to Air Marshal Nur Khan, who was in close contact with President Ayub Khan and General Headquarters.

==== Post-war ====
In March 1966, he represented Pakistan at a Central Treaty Organization (CENTO) seminar in the United States. In a presentation titled "Search and Rescue", Khan explained how the Government of Pakistan was committed to assisting in the search for any aircraft in distress over its territory and to render immediate assistance for the rescue of its occupants, regardless of what their nationality may be.

He was appointed as the Commandant of the PAF Staff College in May 1966. Thereafter, he was appointed Assistant Chief of Air Staff (Administration) in June 1968.

In a confidential document sent to the Ministry of Defence (United Kingdom) in June 1969, Air Adviser Group Captain G. S. Johns conveyed that the PAF remained calm, professional, and largely detached from politics during the political crisis that led to the resignation of President Ayub Khan in early 1969. Writing to the Ministry, Johns stated: "As events led up to the fall of Field Marshal Ayub Khan, there was no excitement within the P.A.F. I attended a party in Karachi on 21st February, 1969, the evening of Ayub’s speech declaring his intention to stand down; the three P.A.F. Air Officers and several senior officers present showed little concern and preferred to talk about other things. One of them, Air Commodore Rahim Khan — ACAS Admin— proposed to (and did) carry on with his shooting trip organised for the next two days —a thousand miles from P.A.F. Headquarters."

(Retd) Air Commodore Sajad Haider in his book, Flight of the Falcon, recalled flying Chief of General Staff Gul Hassan Khan to Dacca on 7 July 1969. It was on this trip that General Hassan hinted to him that Khan may become the next Chief of the Pakistan Air Force. He was promoted to the rank of Air Vice Marshal in August 1969.

==== Commander-in-Chief (1969-1972) ====
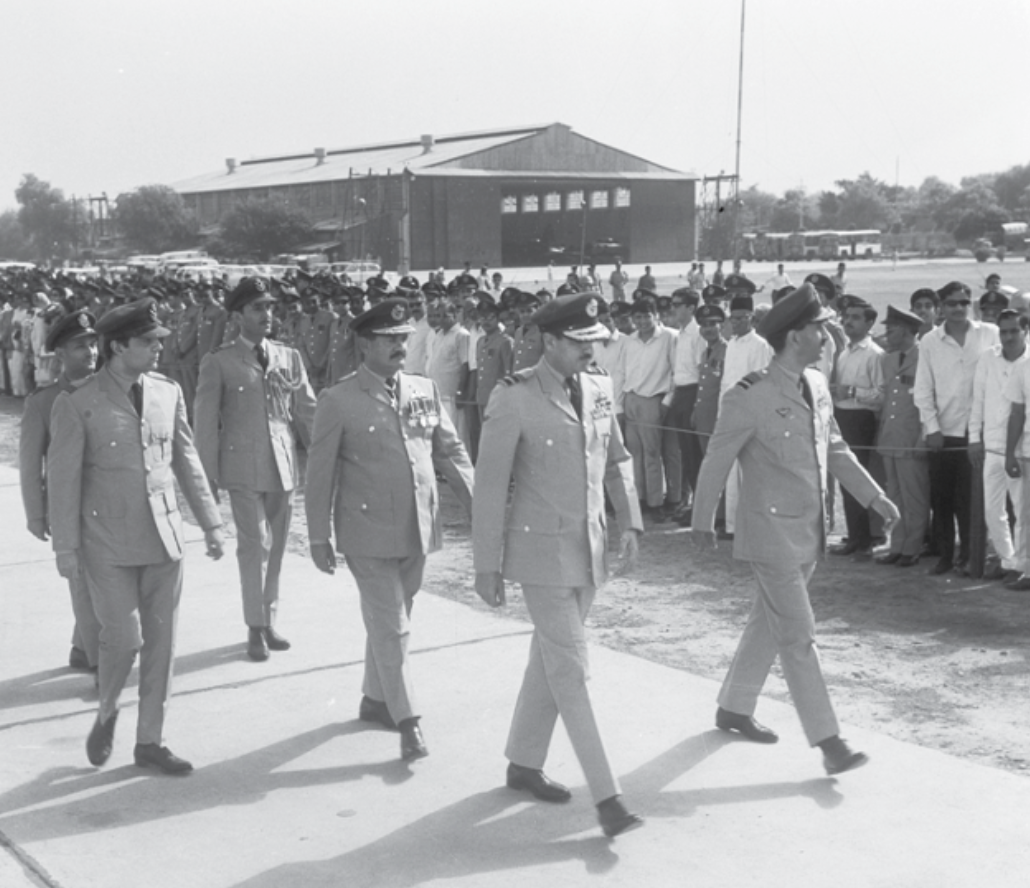
Abdur Rahim Khan takes over as Commander-in-Chief from Air Marshal Nur Khan, walking side by side, 1969

President Zulfikar Ali Bhutto, Lt Gen Gul Hassan and Air Marshal Abdur Rahim Khan, arrive in Peking. They are greeted by Chinese Premier Zhou Enlai and 5,000 young citizens. Khan, distinguished by his grey suit and mustache, is seen walking alongside Bhutto from 0:28-0:31 and then from 0:52-0:58, behind him, 1972

President Zulfikar Ali Bhutto, Lt Gen Gul Hassan, and Air Marshal Abdur Rahim Khan meet with Premier Zhou Enlai, 1972

On 1 September 1969, Air Marshal Abdur Rahim Khan succeeded Air Marshal Nur Khan as Commander-in-Chief of the Pakistan Air Force and Deputy Chief Martial Law Administrator. As Chief, Khan doubled the number of operational airfields, ordered for concrete aircraft pens and underground fuel storage facilities to be built, which proved effective during India's attacks on Pakistani bases during the 1971 War.

On the evening of 27 January 1970, Khan arrived in Jordan on an official five-day state visit and was received at the airport by the Commander-in-Chief of the Jordanian Armed Forces, Major General Sharif Nasir bin Jamil and Chief of Staff Ali Hayari. On 29 January, Khan met with King Hussein who gave him a tour of Jordanian Army camps facing Israel. Afterwards, King Hussain decorated Khan with the Knight of the Order of the Star of Jordan.

Seeing the storm brewing in East Pakistan, Air Marshal Abdur Rahim Khan had ordered for large numbers of camouflaged revetments to be constructed at air bases. He also ordered for airfields to be protected by anti-aircraft guns including quad-mounted, half-inch machine guns supplied by the United States and Chinese built 14.5mm heavy machine guns beside 37mm cannons. He increased the amount of ground observers who proved successful in warning of approaching Indian aircraft. Additionally, the PAF's radar coverage was expanded and the command and control system was upgraded by adding Soviet P-35 radar, Plessey AR-1 low-level radars and Marconi Martello Condor ground-controlled intercept stations.

In September 1971, Libyan Colonel Muammar Gaddafi accepted Air Marshal Khan's invitation to Pakistan when the latter represented President Yahya Khan at the second anniversary of the 1969 Libyan revolution.

In an interview to The New York Times in December 1971, Indian Air Force Commander Pratap Chandra Lal, a former Royal Indian Air Force colleague of Khan's, described him as "a fine person and a first‐rate officer."

===== Resignation =====
On 2 March 1972, Commander-in-Chief General Gul Hassan Khan and Air Marshal Khan resigned after Prime Minister Zulfikar Ali Bhutto requested that they order the Pakistan Army and have Pakistan Air Force jets fly over crowds of police officers protesting in Lyallpur and the North-West Frontier Province against his government, demanding higher pay, an order which both officers refused.

According to one source, during the meeting with both officers: "Bhutto initiated the discussion by saying, "Gentlemen, the country is going through one crisis after another and with the latest one being the strike by the police and for which no cooperation has been forthcoming from the army and the air force when asked for, I regret that a stage has come when we can no longer carry on like this. Therefore I am not prepared to run the government in this sort of an environment."

As soon as Bhutto finished, Gul Hassan, immediately stood up and confronted Bhutto, saying to his face, "Well that's all right Mr President but let me also make it clear that this kind of non-cooperation will continue if the demands placed on the services and especially on the army is not lawful. And as far as I am personally concerned I want to make it quite clear that I am ready to quit right now." After Gul Hassan's statement, Bhutto "wore a mischievous smile" and promptly handed over two file covers to Gul Hassan and Abdur Rahim Khan. Inside were resignation letters prepared for them to sign. Gul Hassan, showing contempt, threw the file back at Bhutto, who then attempted to shake his hand."

== Diplomatic career ==
Subsequently, Abdur Rahim Khan was appointed as the Ambassador of Pakistan to Spain from 11 May 1972 until 13 April 1977, when he resigned alongside Gul Hassan Khan, Pakistan's Ambassador to Greece, in protest against the rigged 1977 Pakistani general election by Prime Minister Zulfikar Ali Bhutto.

== Later life and death ==
After resigning, Khan considered moving to the United Kingdom. His wife wrote that, to him, it seemed to be in "economic decline & full of racial prejudice." According to her, Khan, who was respected by his American counterparts, went to the American ambassador in Madrid and asked for political asylum in the United States. The same year, Khan and his family moved to Virginia and resided in the home of a United States Air Force colonel before moving into their own home. In 1980, Khan sold his home in Islamabad to put a down payment on a house in Potomac, Maryland in the United States.

Khan underwent a successful kidney transplant in December 1989 and developed a fever soon after. He returned home for about a week before doctors quickly readmitted him. By February 1990, his kidney was functioning well, but other organs began to fail. He contracted a viral infection from his hospital stay in Washington, which the medical team couldn't identify. His primary surgeon was on holiday, and the junior surgeons were unable to save him. His wife witnessed him slip into a coma and he remained on life support in intensive care for four days. During this time, Mehrunissa wrote that he was unaware of his surroundings as he had lost all cognitive functions and was brain dead. His wife was advised to go home, as it was only a matter of time. On 28 February 1990, his heart failed and he died at the age of 64. He was given an Islamic funeral and buried with full military honors in Maryland.

== Legacy and commemorations ==
Anthropologist and historian David Montgomery Hart, in his 1985 book, "Guardians of the Khaibar Pass: The Social Organisation and History of the Afridis of Pakistan," wrote: "Finally I am indebted to Air Marshal Rahim Khan, formerly Pakistan's Ambassador in Madrid, not only for suggesting, before we left for the field, that I work through the provincial government in Peshawar rather than the national government in Islamabad but also for giving me appropriate names and addresses;"

In the 2009 book, "Flight of the Falcon," (Retd) Air Commodore Sajad Haider wrote a "requiem" dedicated to Khan:

"Rahim Khan had been virtually exiled and sent to Spain as the Ambassador around this time. He called me from Madrid and asked what had happened. I briefly gave him the gist. He invited me to visit him in Spain on my way back to Pakistan. I frankly told him I had no money for a ticket. He arranged my travel and I left my son Adnan with Capt TK Khan who was the Naval Attaché in London and spent two wonderful nights as the guest of Rahim Khan. He was generous and empathetic. We sat till very late and I gave him a run down on the PAF with details of my Court-Martial. He had tears rolling down his eyes as he listened to how his service had been debased. He later resigned and moved to the US and lived hand to mouth till his sudden death from a wrong diagnosis by the American medics post a kidney transplant.

For the umpteenth time in our short history, yet another gallant and true son of the soil departed, but with dignity and courage. Air Mshl Rahim Khan passed away in oblivion, silently and gently – just like the man he was. The media announced his demise in a matter of fact way – without remorse or sorrow. But let us make no mistakes; his death tore many hearts; the hearts of those airmen, soldiers, seamen and friends all over the world who idolized him, especially those from the Pakistan Air Force. They loved his mumblings, which were straight forward truths, uttered with typical dignity, humour and large heartedness. Those who knew him would say unflinchingly that never in his life, had Rahim Khan spoken about any one with malice; not even his worse detractors and enemies.

He was a man at the helm at a time of the most lucrative opportunities, which were exploited by many so called friends as the PAF entered the Mirage-III contracts with Marcel Dassault. He died on the fringes of poverty like the few honest and courageous men left in Pakistan. None of his beneficiaries and the parasites living in the lap of luxury in London ever bothered to even call him during his last, desolate years. We, the majority of fighter pilots of his era, will cherish his memory for his compassion and incredible love for the Pakistan Air Force. He set stunning examples of grit and courage by flying deep inside enemy territory and destroying their assets during the 1965 War. I was an eye witness to him leading from the front.

His only weakness and failing was that he was magnanimous with even those snakes who derided him while breeding on his kindness. He always gave them the benefit of the doubt and his worst retribution was to send such contemptuous officers on lucrative postings abroad or to the helm of the PIA. May Allah rest his soul in heavenly peace."

== Dates of rank ==
Insignia	Rank	Date
	Air Marshal	1 September 1969
	Air Vice Marshal	August 1969
	Air Commodore	November 1964
	Group Captain	December 1956
	Wing Commander	1952
	Squadron Leader	February 1949
	Flight Lieutenant	1948
	Flying Officer	30 November 1946
	Pilot Officer	5 December 1944

== Awards and decorations ==
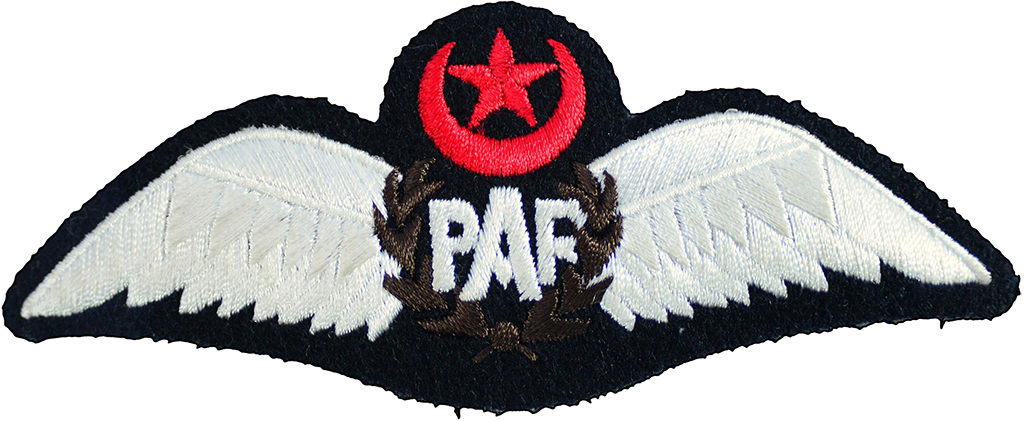

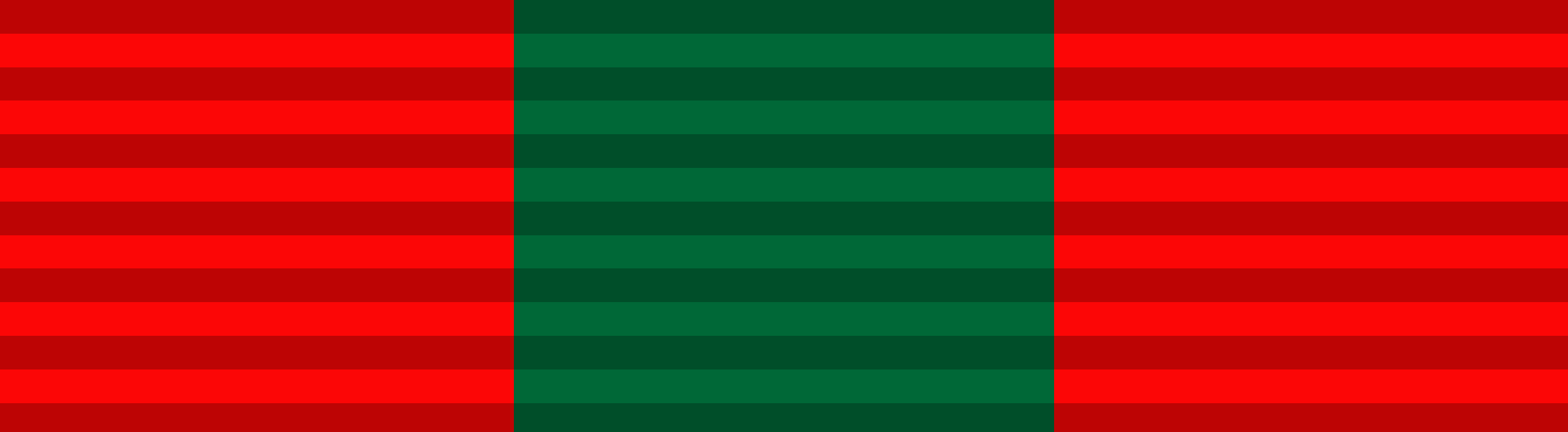

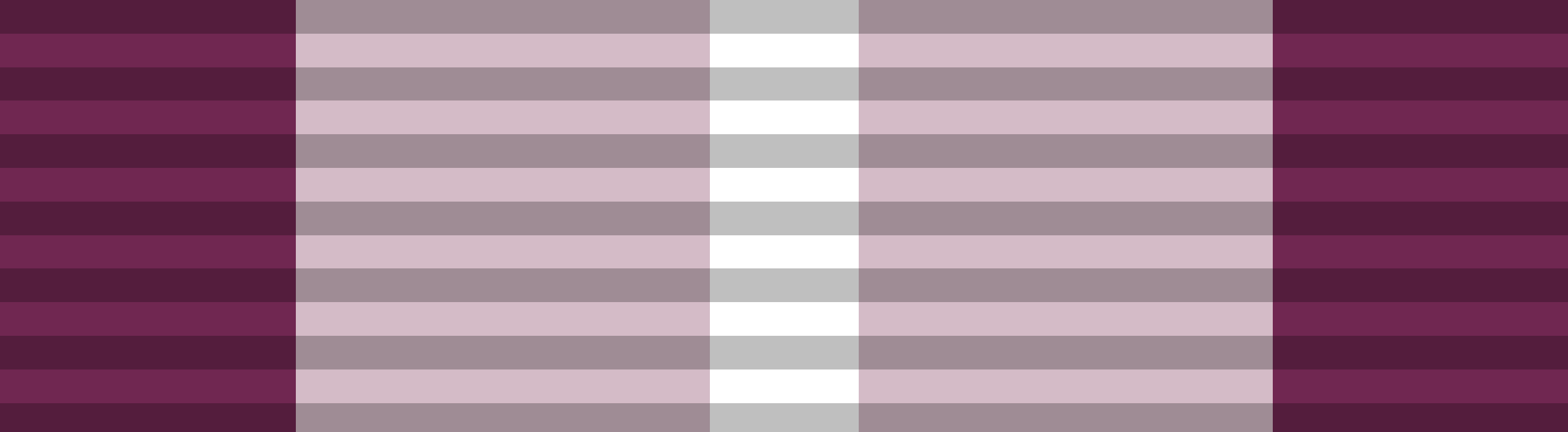

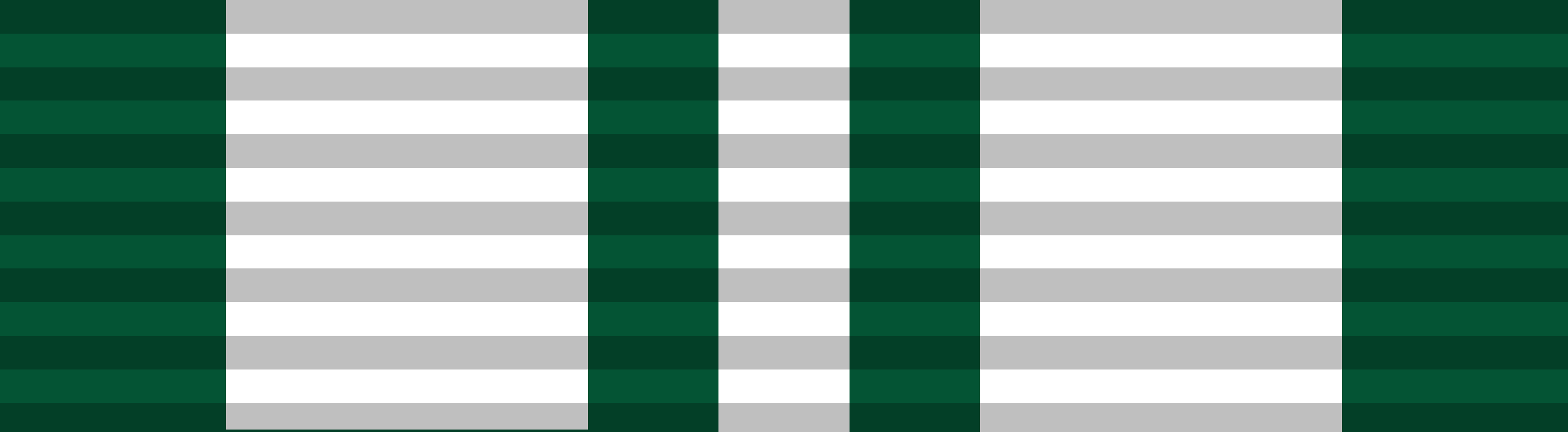

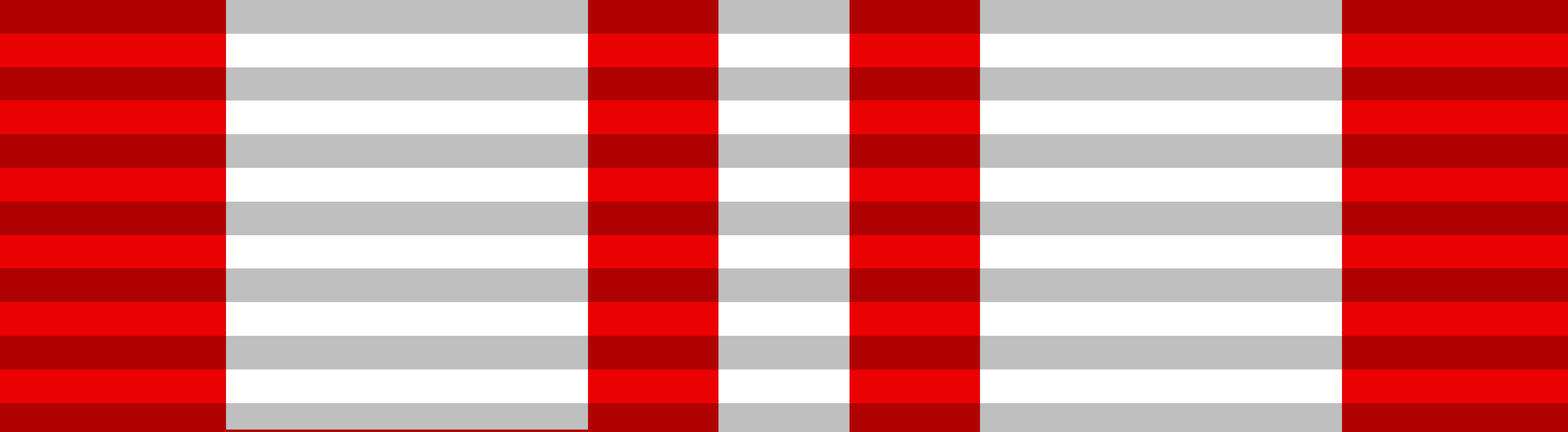

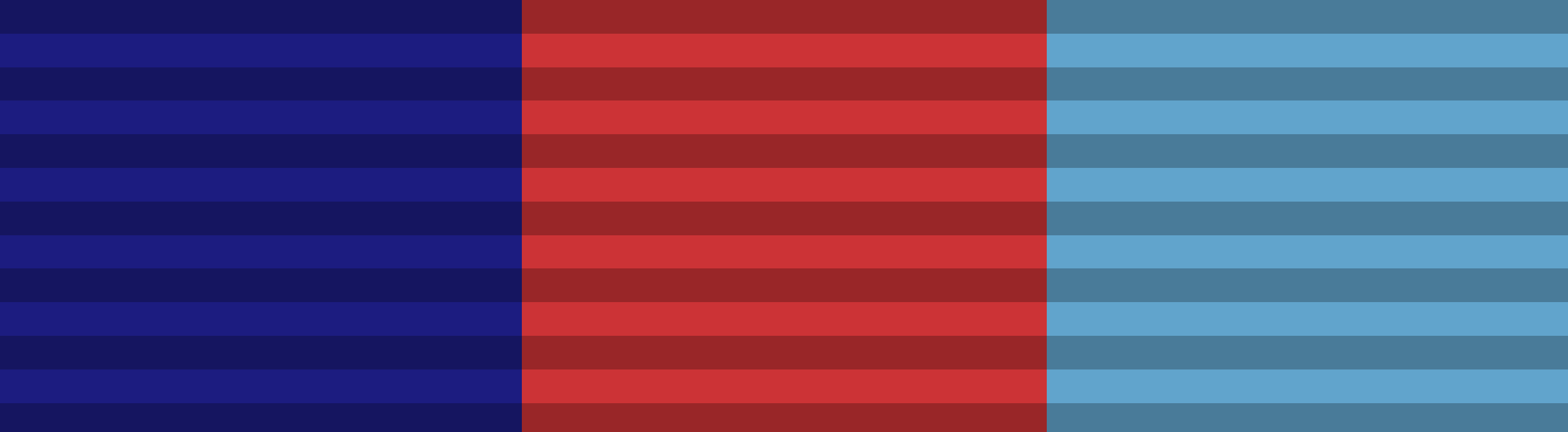

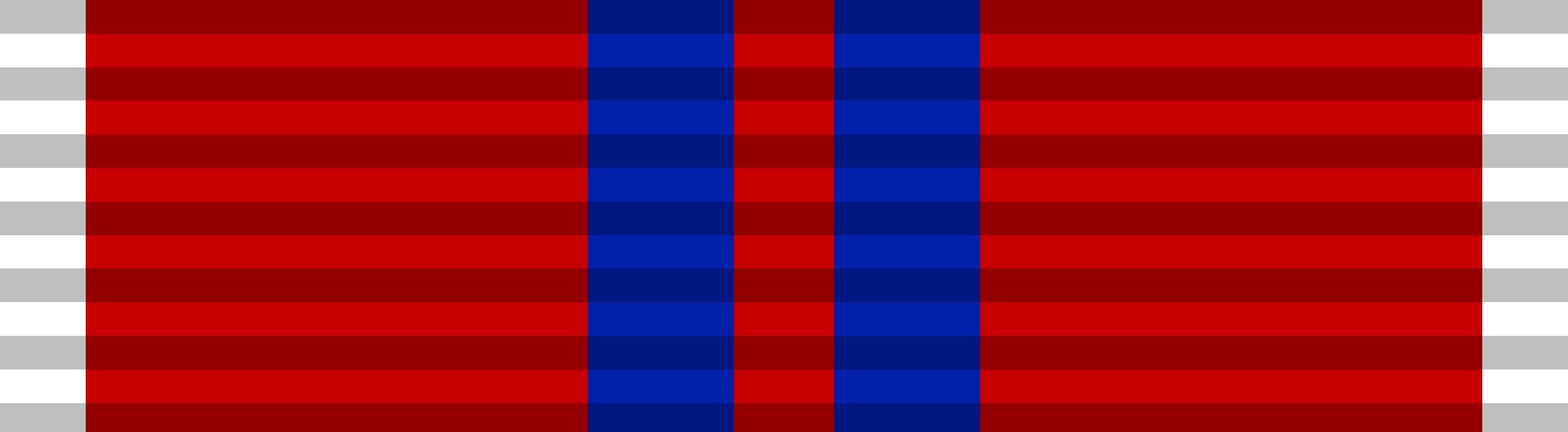

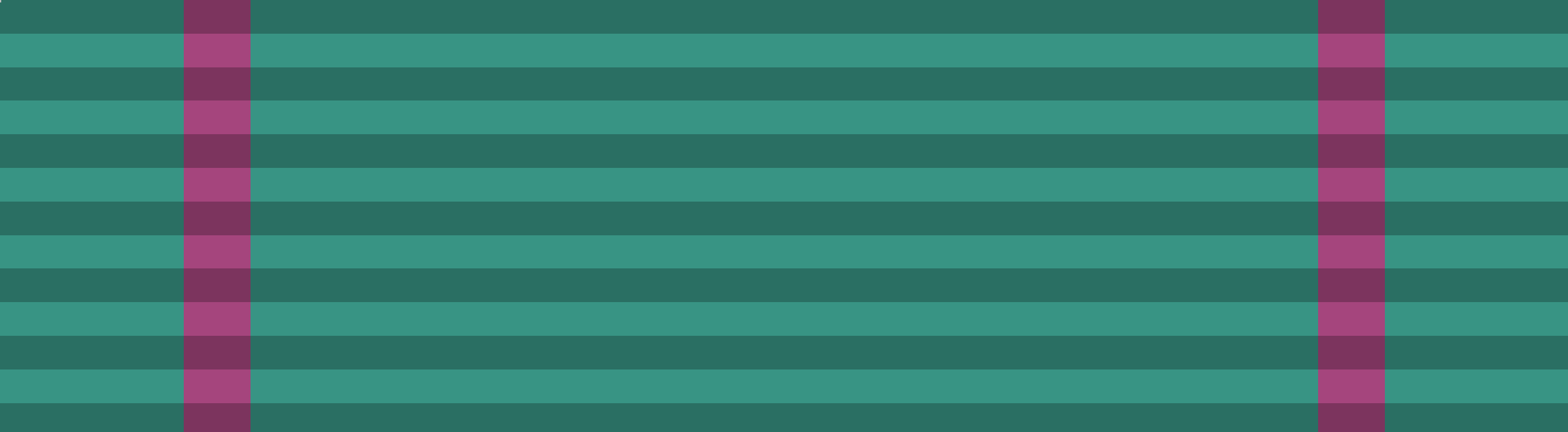

PAF GD(P) Badge RED (More than 3000 Flying Hours)
	Hilal-e-Jurat (Crescent of Courage) 1971 War	Hilal-e-Quaid-e-Azam (Crescent of the Great Leader) (HQA)	
Sitara-e-Pakistan (Star of Pakistan) (SPk)	Sitara-e-Khidmat (Star of Service) (SK)	Sitara-e-Basalat (Star of Valour) 1959	Tamgha-e-Diffa (Defence Medal): 1. 1965 War Clasp; 2. 1971 War Clasp
Sitara-e-Harb 1965 War (War Star 1965)	Sitara-e-Harb 1971 War (War Star 1971)	Tamgha-e-Jang 1965 War (War Medal 1965)	Tamgha-e-Jang 1971 War (War Medal 1971)
Pakistan Tamgha (Pakistan Medal) 1947	Tamgha-e-Qayam-e-Jamhuria (Republic Commemoration Medal) 1956	1939-1945 Star	Burma Star 1945
War Medal 1939-1945	India Service Medal 1939–1945	Queen Elizabeth II Coronation Medal (1953)	Order of the Star of Jordan (Wisam al-Kawkab al-Urduni) (Knight); 1970

=== Foreign decorations ===
Foreign Awards
UK	1939-1945 Star
UK	War Medal 1939-1945
UK	India Service Medal
UK	Queen Elizabeth II Coronation Medal
UK	Burma Star
Jordan	Order of the Star of Jordan (Knight)

== Notes ==
Military offices
Preceded by Nur Khan	Commander-in-Chief; 1969-1972	Succeeded by Zafar Chaudhry; Office renamed to Chief of Air Staff
