= No. 20 Squadron PAF =

No. 20 Squadron
- Logo of the squadron
- Active: Since March 1956 (69 years, 5 months and 22 days)
- Disbanded: 1972-1977
- Country: Pakistan
- Allegiance: Pakistan Armed Forces
- Branch: Pakistan Air Force
- Type: Squadron
- Role: Air Superiority
- Part of: Central Air Command
- Airbase: PAF Base MM Alam
- Nickname(s): Cheetahs
- Motto(s): مری نگاہ عقابی بلند ہے پرواز (Urdu for 'My aim is to fly high like the eagle')
- Mascot(s): Cheetah
- Aircraft: Chengdu F-7PG
- Engagements: 1965 Indo-Pakistani war; 1971 Indo-Pakistani war; Eastern Front

Commanders
- Notable commanders: Zulfiqar Ali Khan; Sohail Aman

Aircraft flown
- Fighter: Shenyang F-6; Chengdu F-7P; Chengdu F-7PG
- Reconnaissance: Lockheed RT-33; Dassault Mirage-IIIRP
- Trainer: Chengdu FT-7P

No. 20 Air Superiority Squadron, nicknamed Cheetahs is a unit of the Pakistan Air Force established in 1956. It flies the Chengdu F-7PG Airguard jets and is based at PAF Base MM Alam. Initially formed as a photo- reconnaissance flight at PAF Base Mauripur, the squadron has evolved over the decades, participating in significant missions and conflicts. It currently operates Chengdu F-7PG Airguard jets and is based at PAF Base MM Alam. The squadron has a rich history, including contributions to the demarcation of the China–Pakistan border, the World Bank's Indus Basin Project, and active roles in the 1965 and 1971 Indo-Pakistani wars. After being disbanded in 1972 and reactivated in 1977, the squadron transitioned through various aircraft, including the Dassault Mirage IIIRP and Shenyang F-6, before adopting the Chengdu F-7P Skybolts and, later, the F-7PGs. The squadron celebrated its Golden Jubilee in 2008 and continues to play a vital role in the PAF's operational activities and exercises.

== History ==
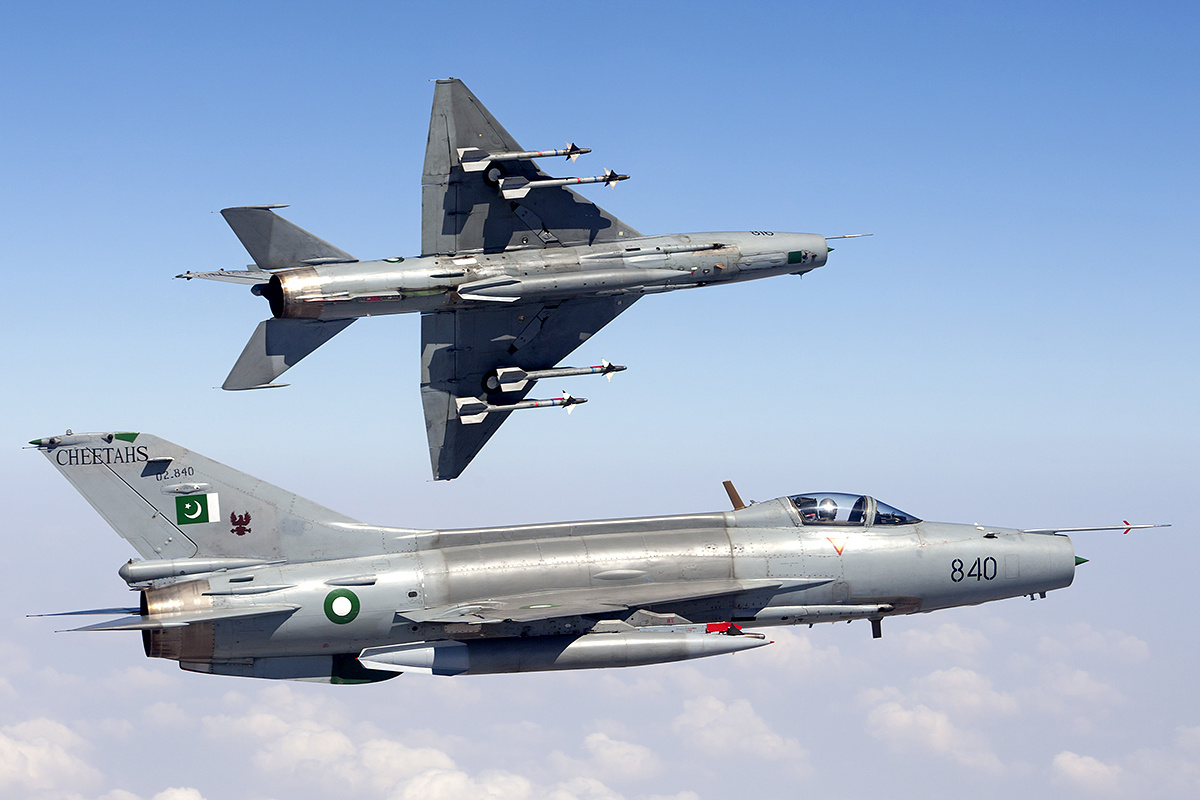
Chengdu F-7PGs of the 20 Squadron armed with Sidewinders in 2013.

The unit was originally established in March 1956 as a photo-reconnaissance flight at PAF Base Mauripur, flying Lockheed RT-33 Shooting Stars under the command of Flight Lieutenant Zulfiqar Ali Khan. By 1957, the unit's status was upgraded to a squadron with the role of photo-recce. Over the next few years, the unit took part in several photographic survey missions over Northern Pakistan, notably over the then-disputed Trans-Karakoram Tract. In 1963, the RT-33s contributed to the demarcation of the China–Pakistan border by providing detailed photographic data.

In 1964, the squadron's RT-33s facilitated the World Bank's Indus Basin Project, photographing major river basins of the Indus River. The unit also held a key role in the selection of the site for the Mangla Dam and Tarbela Dam.

On the outbreak of the 1965 Indo-Pakistani War, the squadron flew 24 Aerial reconnaissance missions with the Lockheed RT-33s providing vital photographic data coverage to the PAF and the Army.

During the 1971 Indo-Pakistani War, the squadron while based at PAF Base Rafiqui, flew aerial reconnaissance missions over various battlefields in the Western Front. A detachment of the squadron was also sent to the Eastern Front at PAF Base Tejgaon which went on to support the Army's counter -insurgency operation against Indian-sponsored militants. However, it capitulated after the fall of Dhaka and its RT-33, captured.

After the war, the squadron was disbanded in June 1972, with its assets transferred to No. 2 Squadron. Upon its re-activation in June 1977, the squadron was re-equipped with Dassault Mirage-IIIRP photo-recce variants and assigned the role of day- and night-time tactical attack and Reconnaissance.

By May 1986, the unit was re-established as the No. 20 Air Superiority Squadron with Shenyang F-6 fighters under the command of Wing Commander Shahid. Two years later, the squadron became the PAF's first unit to receive Chengdu F-7P Skybolts, which replaced its vintage F-6s. It continued operating the Skybolts until 2002 when the improved Chengdu F-7PGs entered the squadron. In 2005, the squadron also undertook the responsibility of carrying out Operational Conversion Courses on the F-7PG whenever required.

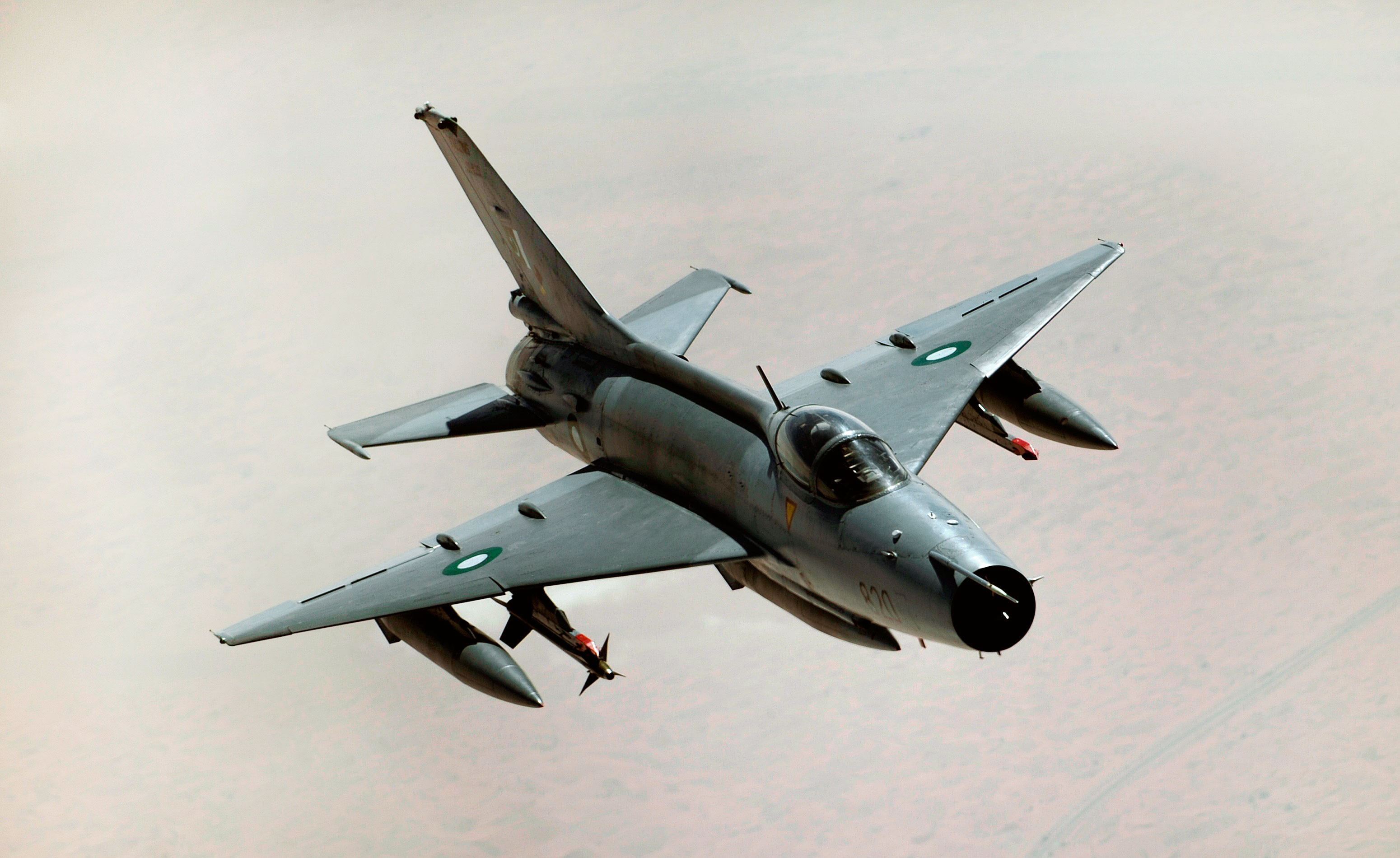
Chengdu F-7PG of the cheetahs

The squadron celebrated its Golden Jubilee in January 2008. Four years later, the squadron shifted to PAF Base MM Alam after spending 36 years at PAF Base Rafiqui, where it remains to this day.

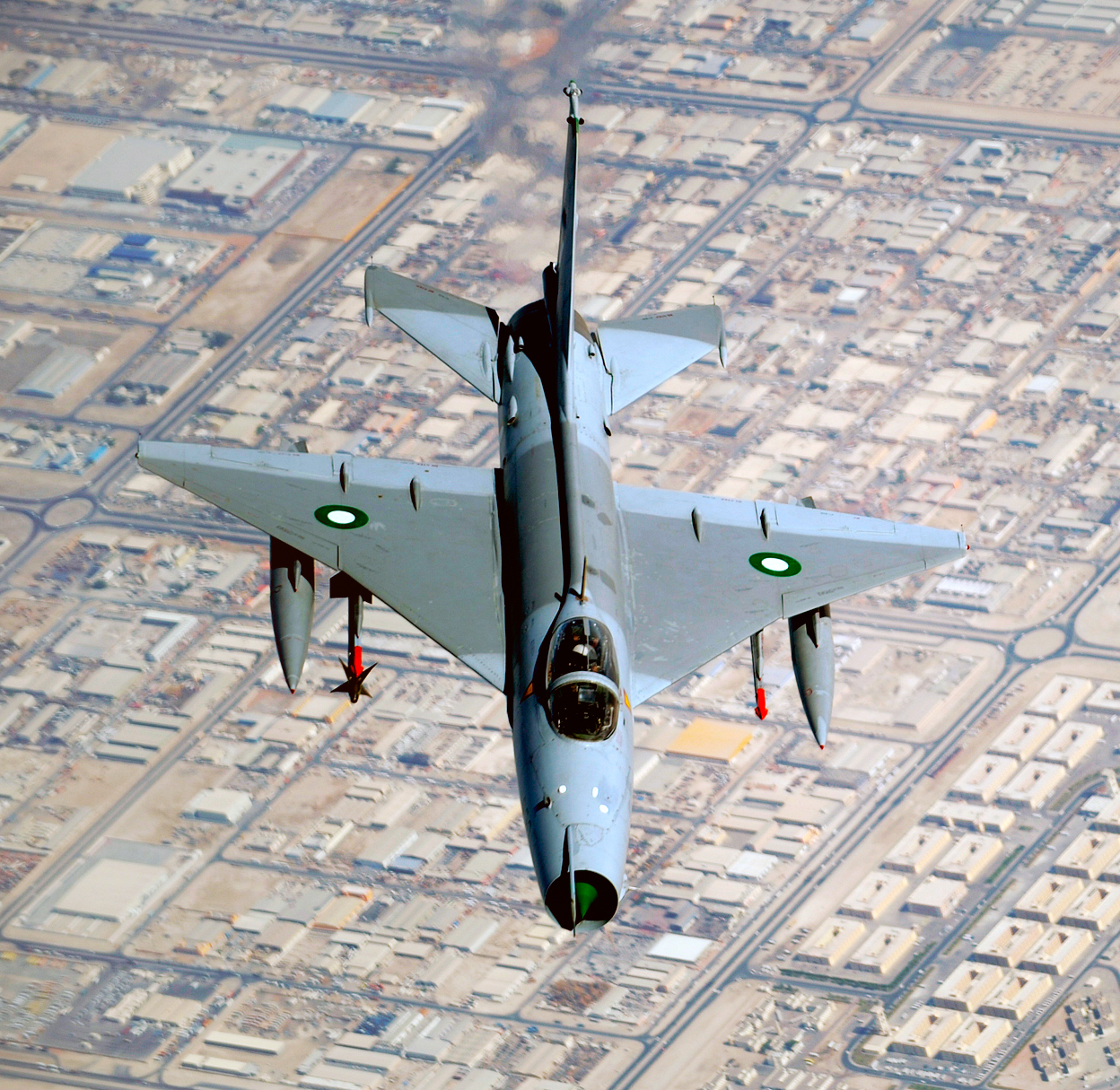
F-7PG from the 20 Squadron

== Exercises ==
Over the years, the No. 20 AS Squadron has taken part in all operational activities and PAF Exercises.

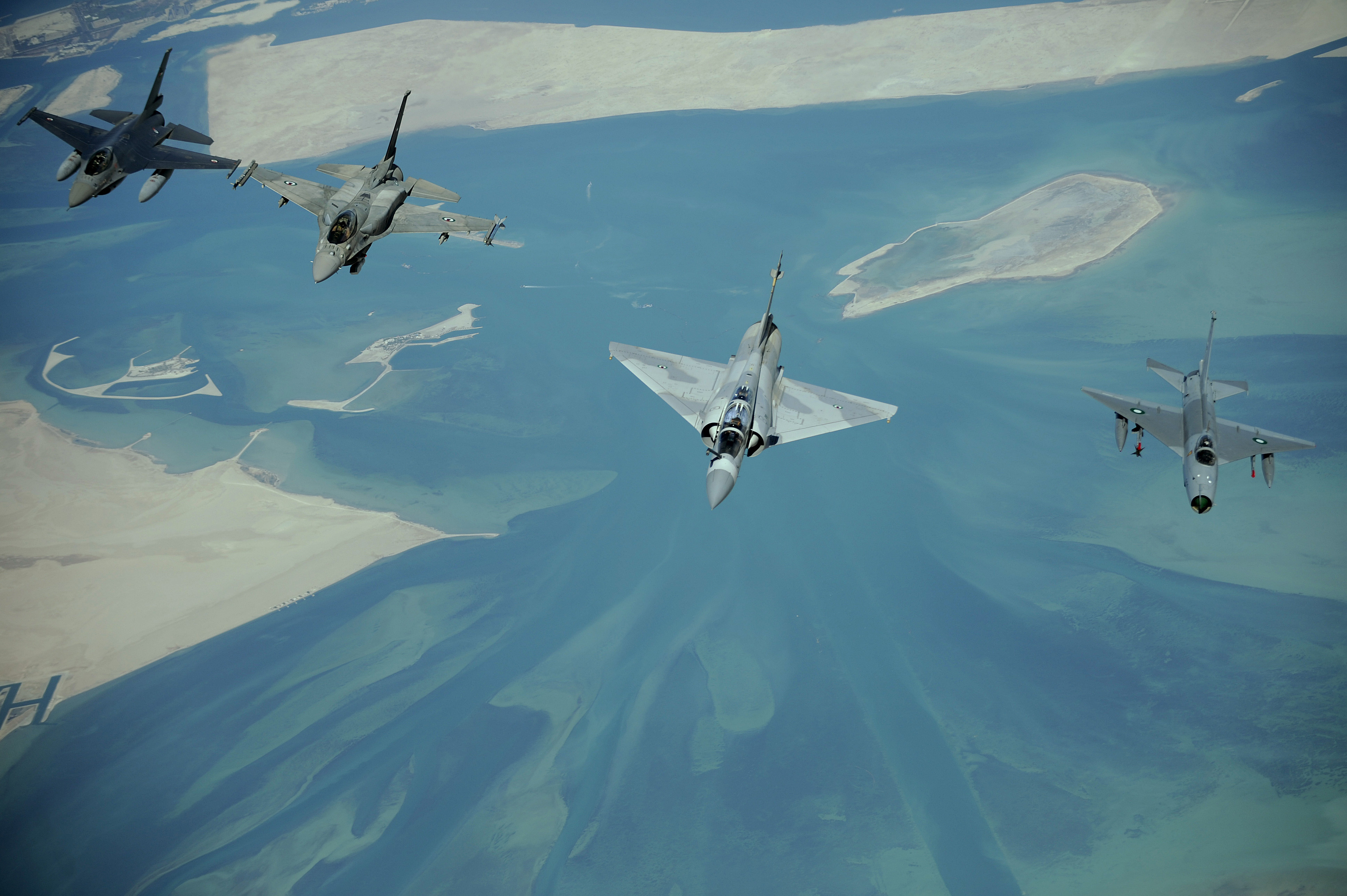
F-7PG of the 20 Squadron (far right) with Emirati F-16's and Mirage 2000 during a multinational exercise on 9 December 2009

1. Dissimilar Air Combat Training (DACT) camps
2. Surface Attack Camps
3. Inter Squadron Armament Competition (ISAC)
4. Exercise High Mark
5. Exercise Hawk Eye
6. Exercise ATLC
7. Exercise Shaheen II

== See also ==
- No. 24 Squadron PAF
- List of Pakistan Air Force squadrons
