= Hakimullah Khan Durrani =

Air Chief Marshal PAF (1935–2024)

Hakimullah Khan NI(M) HI(M) SJ SI(M) SBt TBt
- حکیم اللہ خان

5th Chief of Air Staff
- In office 9 March 1988 – 9 March 1991
- Preceded by: ACM Jamal A. Khan
- Succeeded by: ACM Farooq Feroze Khan

Personal details
- Born: Hakimullah Khan Durrani; 15 October 1935 Sheikh Kali, Peshawar District, Peshawar Division, North-West Frontier Province, British India
- Died: 23 February 2024 (aged 88) Islamabad, Pakistan
- Nickname: Hakim

Military service
- Branch/service: Pakistan Air Force
- Years of service: 1956–1991
- Rank: Air Chief Marshal
- Unit: No. 14 Squadron Tail Choppers (S/No. PAK/3756)
- Commands: DCAS (Administration); Proj-Dir. Project Falcon; DCAS (Air Operations)
- Conflicts: Indo-Pakistani war of 1965; Indo-Pakistani war of 1971
- Awards: See list

Hakimullah Khan Durrani (Note: Urdu: حکیم اللہ خان) (15 October 1935 – 23 February 2024) best known as Hakimullah, was a four-star air officer who tenured as the fifth Chief of Air Staff of the Pakistan Air Force from 9 March 1988 until retiring on 8 March 1991.

He completed his high school in Mardan. He was seen on 14 August 1988 in Islamabad, Pakistan, during the Independence Day parade attended by then military ruler General Zia-ul-Haq and speaker Ghulam Ishaq Khan piloting his F-16 fighter jet and manoeuvring the jet skillfully, receiving praise during the parade because of his skills. He was born in Shielkh Kali on the Charsadda Road which is a small village between village Gulbela and popular resort Sardaryab. He had a large house estate in Shielkh Kali on the main Charsadda Road. There was a free hospital in the same house as well for the people of area.

== Biography ==
Hakimullah Khan Durrani was born in North-West Frontier Province on 15 October 1935 into a Durrani Pashtun family.

After completing his secondary school certificate from the secondary school in Mardan, he joined the Pakistan Air Force in 1954, passing out in 1957 where he gained commission as a pilot officer. Further training took place in the United States where Flying Officer Hakimullah qualified to fly the F-104 Starfighter and participated in the Indo-Pakistani War of 1965. Flight-Lieutenant Hakimullah notably intercepted the Indian Air Force's Folland Gnat flown by then-Flight lieutenant Brijpal Singh Sikand, who was forced to land at the airstrip in Pasrur, Pakistan. This claim, however, has been contested by India. In 1971, Wing-Commander Hakimullah flew the Mirage-IIIA in the western front of the Indo-Pakistani War of 1971, seeing aerial actions against the MiG-21.

On 5 May 1976, Wing Commander Hakimullah was appointed the first commanding officer of the newly established Combat Commanders' School at PAF Base Sargodha.

In 1981, Air-Commodore Hakim was appointed Project-Director of Project Falcon, overseeing the acquisition of F-16s by the air force. In 1986–87, Air Vice-Marshal Hakim served in the Air AHQ as its Chief of Staff under Chief of Air Staff. In 1988, Air-Mshl. Hakimullah was elevated to DCAS (Administration) and was later promoted to four-star rank. At promotion, Air Chief Marshal Hakimullah superseded at least one senior air officer, Air Marshal Shabbir Hussain Syed, the then-Vice Chief of Air Staff (VCAS).

In 1991, Air Chief Marshal Hakimullah completed his tenure and retired to settle in Islamabad.

Durrani died after a prolonged illness on 23 February 2024, at the age of 88. He was buried in his home village that same day, and his funeral was attended by air force officials, and local people.

== Awards and decorations ==
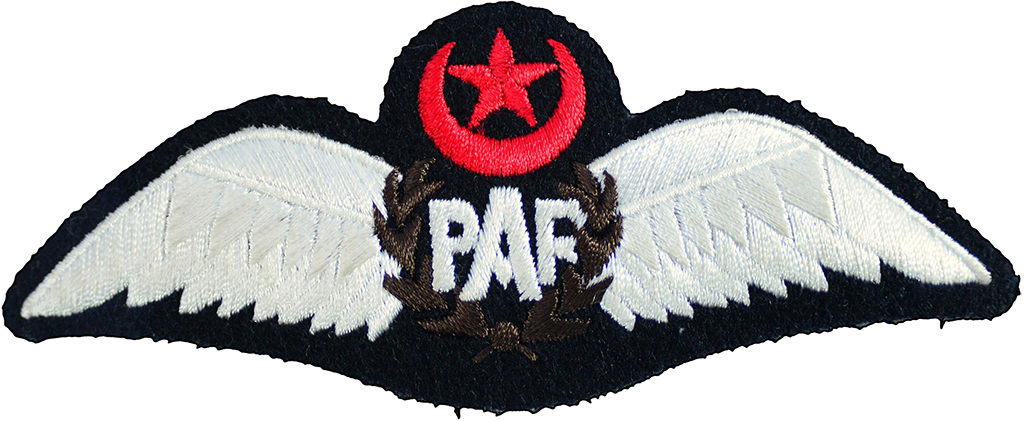

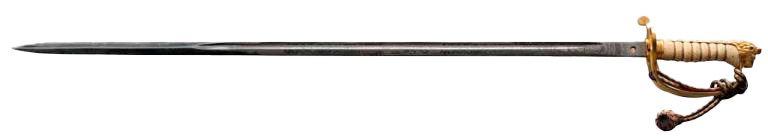

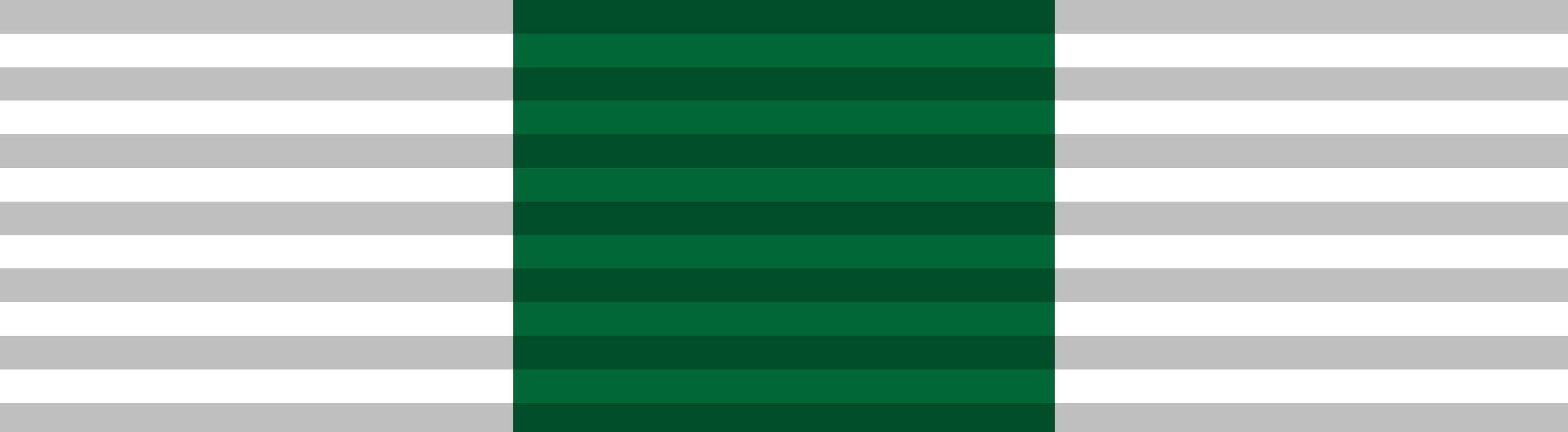

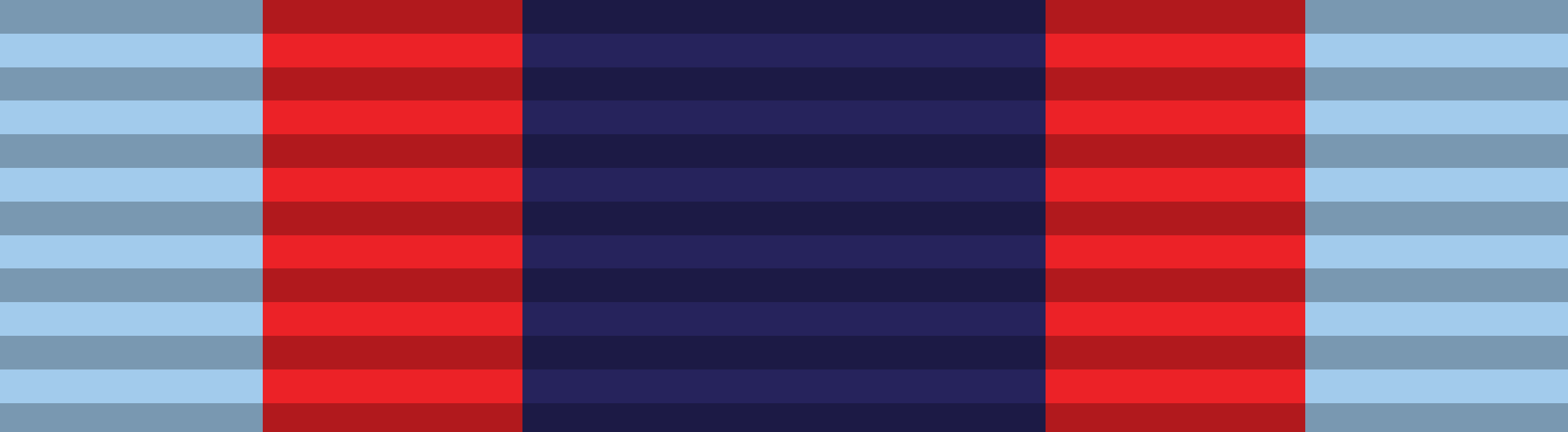

PAF GD(P) Badge RED (More than 3000 Flying Hours)
Combat Commanders' School; Instructor's Sword
Nishan-e-Imtiaz (Military) (Order of Excellence)	Hilal-i-Imtiaz (Military) (Crescent of Excellence)		Sitara-e-Jurat (Star of Courage) 1971 War
Sitara-i-Imtiaz (Military) (Star of Excellence)	Sitara-e-Basalat (Star of Valour) 1965 War	Tamgha-e-Basalat (Medal of Valour)	Tamgha-e-Diffa (Defence Medal): 1. 1965 War Clasp; 2. 1971 War Clasp
Sitara-e-Harb 1965 War (War Star 1965)	Sitara-e-Harb 1971 War (War Star 1971)	Tamgha-e-Jang 1965 War (War Medal 1965)	Tamgha-e-Jang 1971 War (War Medal 1971)
10 Years Service Medal	20 Years Service Medal	30 Years Service Medal	Tamgha-e-Sad Saala Jashan-e-Wiladat-e-Quaid-e-Azam (100th Birth Anniversary of Muhammad Ali Jinnah) 1976
Tamgha-e-Qayam-e-Jamhuria (Republic Commemoration Medal) 1956	Hijri Tamgha (Hijri Medal) 1979	Tamgha-e-Jamhuriat (Democracy Medal) 1988	Qarardad-e-Pakistan Tamgha (Resolution Day Golden Jubilee Medal) 1990

== See also ==
- PAF s' Chief of Air Staffs
- Muhammad Nasir Dar

== Notes ==
Military offices
Preceded by Jamal A. Khan	Chief of Air Staff; 1988–1991	Succeeded by Farooq Feroze Khan
