= Nasir Dar =

Pakistan Air Force officer (died 1971)

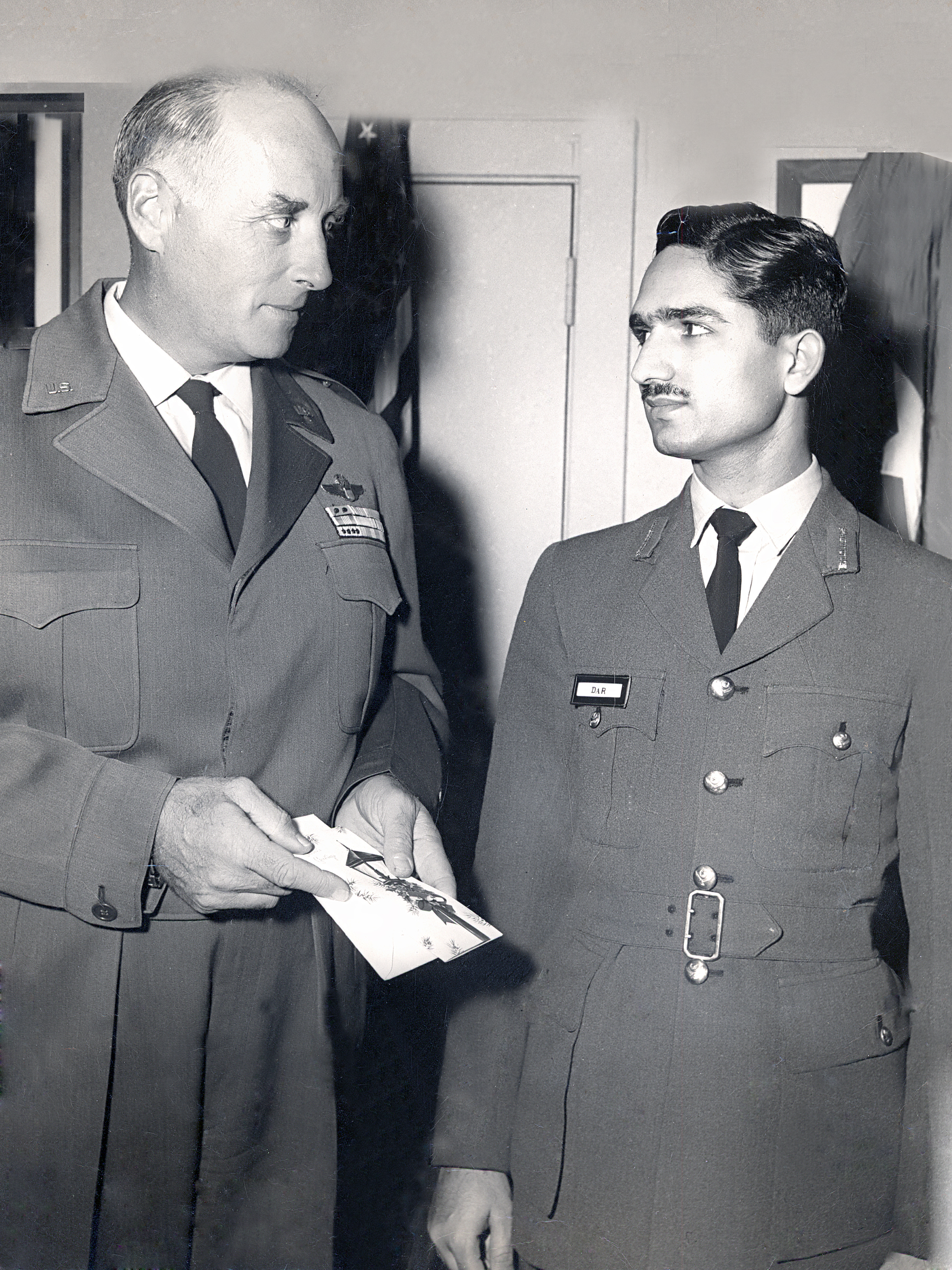
Sqn Ldr Muhammad Nasir Dar (right) with a colleague from the United States Air Force

Muhammad Nasir Dar was an officer of the Pakistan Air Force who died in the line of duty during the Indo-Pakistani War of 1971. He was posthumously awarded the Sitara-e-Basalat.

== Career ==
Dar was inducted into the Pakistan Air Force and rose to be a squadron leader at a young age during the late sixties. One of his batch mates Air Chief Marshal Hakimullah rose to be the twelfth Chief of the Pakistan Air Force from 1988 to 1991. Dar was an officer of a high calibre and was assigned to the Signals branch of the Air Force.

== Death in action ==
During the Indo-Pakistan War of 1971, Squadron Leader Muhammad Nasir Dar was serving at the Pakistan Air Force base at Sargodha. On the night of 22 December 1971, Dar was the victim of an Indian air raid on his engineering facility. He was undeterred by the attack and continued to work normally beyond the call of duty. During the course of the air raid, both he and his junior colleague, Flight Lieutenant, Wasim were killed.

== Decoration ==
Subsequently, he was awarded the high award of Sitara-i-Basalat or Star of Good Conduct for his act of extreme bravery in the face of certain death. He is regarded as one of the legendary falcons of the Pakistan Air Force.
