= Shamim Alam Khan =

Pakistani general (1937–2021)

Shamim Alam Khan NI(M) HI(M) SJ Sbt LoM
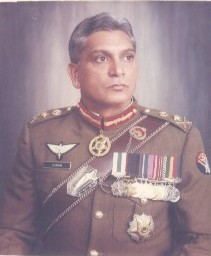
- Shamim Alam Khan (1937–2021)

7th Chairman Joint Chiefs of Staff Committee
- In office 17 August 1991 – 9 November 1994
- Preceded by: Iftikhar Ahmed Sirohey
- Succeeded by: Farooq Feroze Khan

Personal details
- Born: Shamim Alam; 18 August 1937 Shillong, Assam, British Indian Empire (now in Meghalaya in India)
- Died: 9 December 2021 (aged 84) Rawalpindi, Punjab, Pakistan
- Relations: Javed Alam Khan (Brother)

Military service
- Allegiance: Pakistan
- Branch/service: Pakistan Army
- Years of service: 1954–1994
- Rank: General
- Unit: 20th Lancers, Armoured Corps
- Commands: XXXI Corps, Bahawalpur; Chief of General Staff, Army GHQ; II Corps, Multan; Armoured Corps
- Battles/wars: Indo-Pakistani War of 1965; Indo-Pakistani War of 1971; Battle of Chamb; Operation Blue Fox; Somali Civil War; Somalia (UNOSOM I); Operation Gothic Serpent
- Awards: Nishan-e-Imtiaz (Military); Hilal-e-Imtiaz (Military); Sitara-e-Jurat; Sitara-e-Basalat; Legion d'honneur Turkish Legion of Merit; Order of Military Merit

Shamim Alam Khan (Urdu: شمیم عالم; 18 August 1937 – 9 December 2021), was a four star-rank general in the Pakistan Army who served as the 7th Chairman Joint Chiefs of Staff Committee from 1991 until retiring in 1994.

== Biography ==
Shamim Alam Khan was born in Shillong, Meghalaya in India, into an Urdu-speaking family on 18 August 1937. His father, Mahboob Alam Khan, was an officer in the Indian Civil Service who worked at an administration position at the Survey of India. His mother, Nisa Begum, was a housewife. Mahboob had nine children with Nisa among all joined the respected branches of the Pakistan Armed Forces.

After the partition of India in 1947, the Alam family moved from Bangalore to Rawalpindi via train, witnessing the violence and riots that were taking place in the trains at the time of the partition in 1947. Eventually, Mahboob Alam found employment at the Survey of Pakistan.

After his matriculation, Alam went to attend the Lawrence College where he earned the diploma, which allowed to him to attend the Government College University (GCU) in Lahore, Punjab, Pakistan. However, he left his studies at the GCU after he joined the Pakistan Army in 1954 which directed him to attend the Pakistan Military Academy in Kakul. In 1956, he passed out in the class of 14th PMA Long Course from the PMA Kakul, earning a commission in the 20th Lancers, Armoured Corps. In 1958–60, Lt. Alam joined the elite Special Service Group (SSG), eventually was selected to be trained with the United States Army's Special Forces in Fort Bragg in North Carolina, United States.

Upon returning, Major Alam participated in the second war with India in 1965, commanding a company against the Indian Army and his actions of valour earned him the Sitara-e-Jurat by the President of Pakistan in 1966. In 1967–70, Maj. Alam went to the United Kingdom where he attended the British Army's Staff College in Camberley, and served in the 28th Cavalry in the Chamb sector on the western front of the third war with India in 1971. After the war, Maj. Alam went to attend the National Defence University, along with his brother Lt-Cdr. Shamoon, as both graduated with MSc in War studies. For sometime, Lt-Col. Shamim served a brief stint as an instructor at the Air War College in Islamabad.

== War and command appointments in the military ==
In 1979–80s, Brig. Shamim served as the chief of staff in the I Corps, stationed in Mangla, before commanding the independent armoured brigade stationed in Balochistan. From 1983 to 1985, Major-General Shamim was given the command as GOC of the 1st Armoured Division in Multan.

In 1987 and 1988, Maj-Gen. Shamim's promotion was eventually deferred and overlooked by then-army chief and President Zia-ul-Haq when he only promoted the officer to the command assignment of his choosing. However, Prime Minister Mohammad Junejo interfered in this matter, and eventually he was promoted to the command assignment with the officer of Zia's choosing.

In 1988, Lt-Gen. Shamim was posted on his first formation commanding assignment as the field command of the II Strike Corps, stationed in Multan, Punjab, Pakistan, which he served until 1989 when he was elevated as the Chief of General Staff (CGS) at the Army GHQ in Rawalpindi. In April 1991, Lt-Gen. Shamim was made the field commander of the XXXI Corps, stationed in Bahawalpur, but this command assignment only lasted a few months when President Ghulam Ishaq Khan announced the promotion of the Lt-Gen. Shamim to the four-star rank– he superseded no one as he was the most senior army general in the military.

== Chairman joint chiefs ==
On 8 November 1991, Gen. Shamim took over the Chairmanship of the Joint Chiefs of Staff Committee, and later went on to play a decisive role in support of Gen. Abdul Waheed, then-chief of army staff, to secure the resignations of both President Ghulam Ishaq and Prime Minister Nawaz Sharif to oversee the nationwide general elections in 1993. On 26 November 1992, Gen. Shamim was appointed to the ceremonial post as Col-in-C of the Armoured Corps, which he remained until 18 December 1996. In 1994, Gen. Shamim sought his retirement after completing his tenureship in 1994.

== Death ==
Khan died from COVID-19 in Rawalpindi on 9 December 2021, aged 84, amid the COVID-19 pandemic in Pakistan.

== Awards and decorations ==

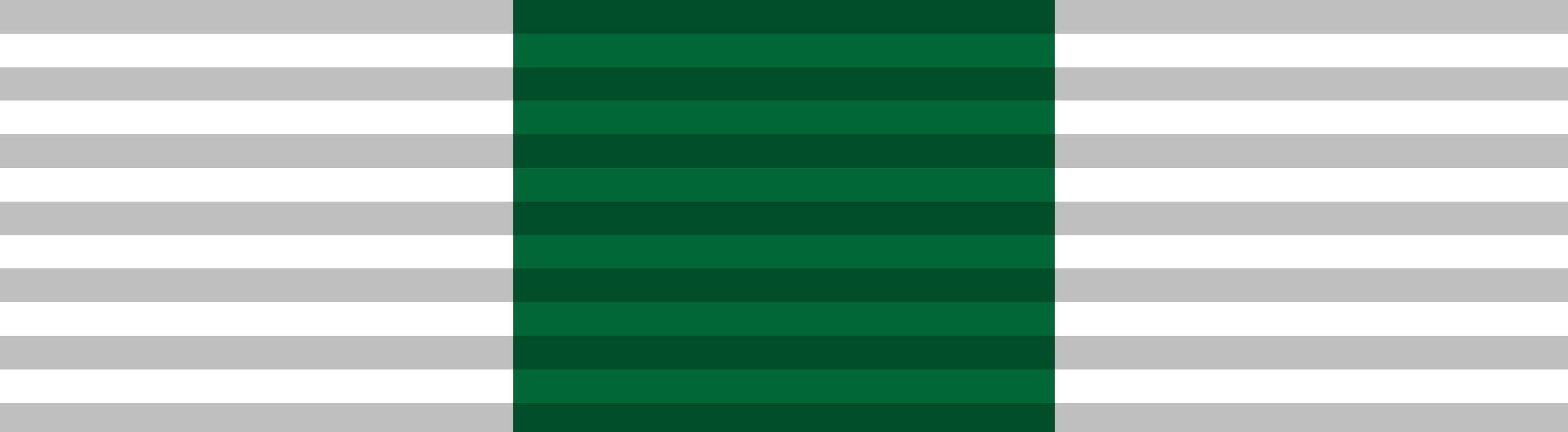

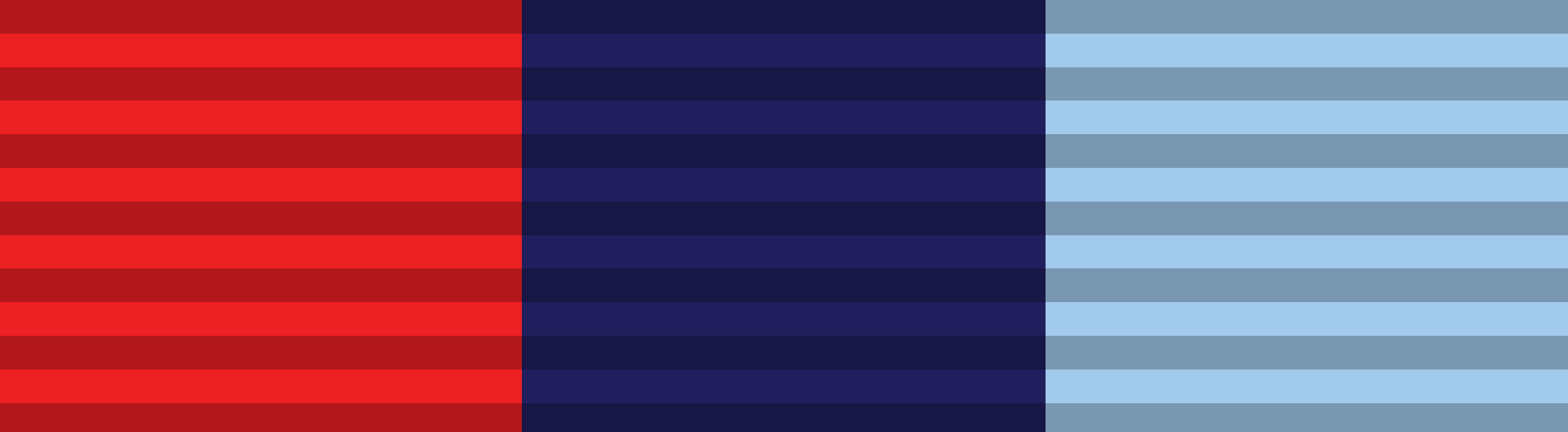

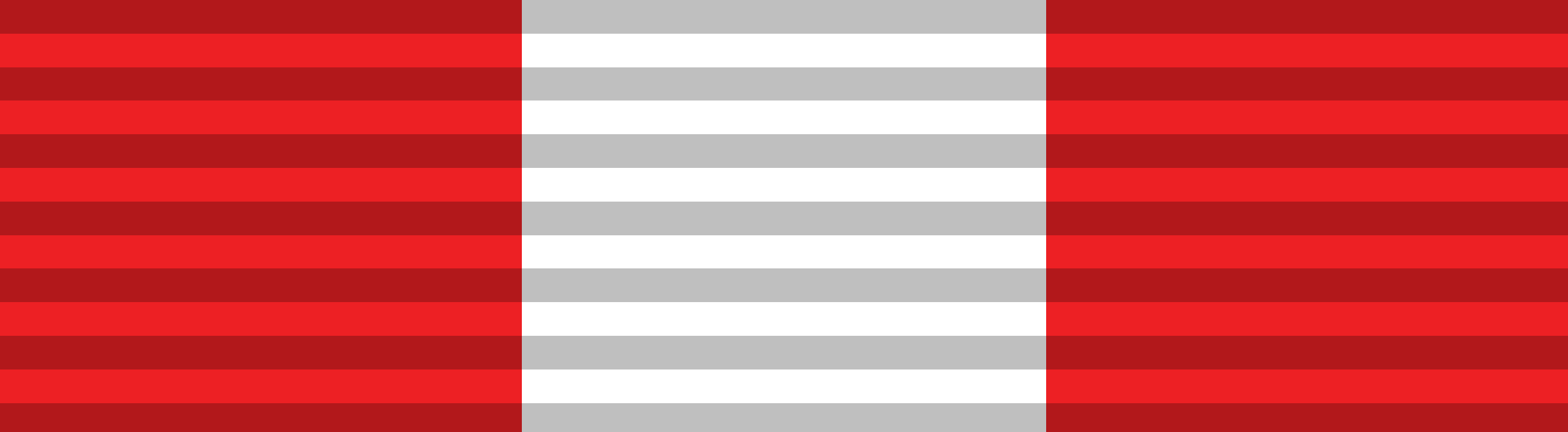

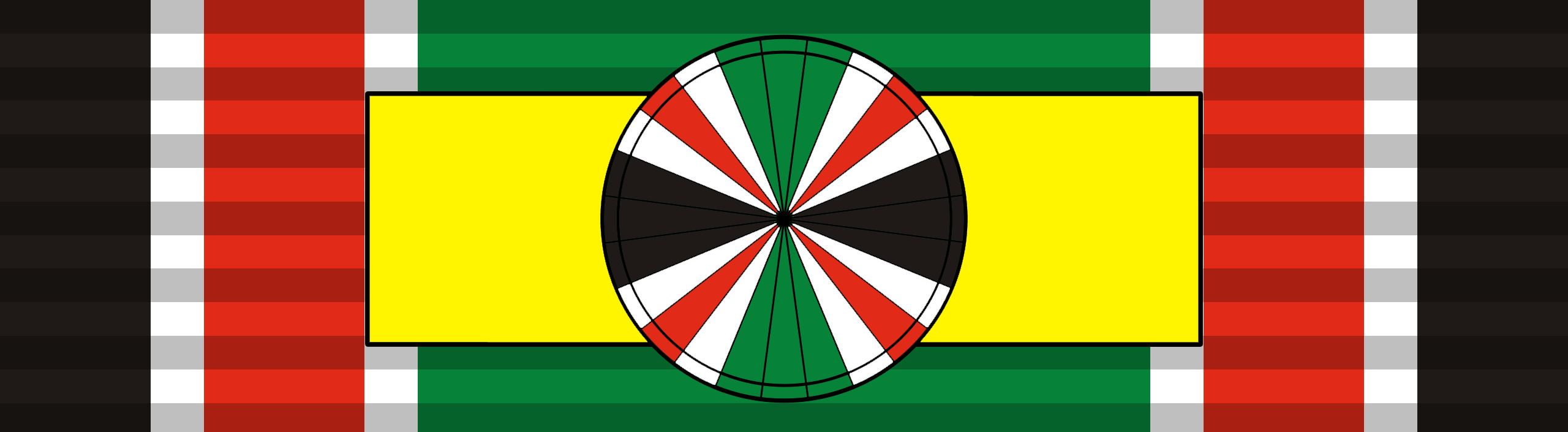

Nishan-e-Imtiaz (Military) (Order of Excellence)	Hilal-e-Imtiaz (Military) (Crescent of Excellence)	Sitara-e-Jurat (Star of Courage) 1965 War	Sitara-e-Basalat (Star of Good Conduct)
Sitara-e-Harb 1965 War (War Star 1965)	Sitara-e-Harb 1971 War (War Star 1971)	Tamgha-e-Jang 1965 War (War Medal 1965)	Tamgha-e-Jang 1971 War (War Medal 1971)
10 Years Service Medal	20 Years Service Medal	30 Years Service Medal	40 Years Service Medal
Tamgha-e-Sad Saala Jashan-e- Wiladat-e-Quaid-e-Azam (100th Birth Anniversary of Muhammad Ali Jinnah) 1976	Tamgha-e-Jamhuria (Republic Commemoration Medal) 1956	Hijri Tamgha (Hijri Medal) 1979	Jamhuriat Tamgha (Democracy Medal) 1988
Qarardad-e-Pakistan Tamgha (Resolution Day Golden Jubilee Medal) 1990	Legion of Honour Grand Officer Class (France)	Turkish Legion of Merit (Turkey)	Order of Military Merit Grand Cordon (Jordan)

=== Foreign Decorations ===
Foreign Awards
France	Légion d'honneur
Turkey	Turkish Legion of Merit
Jordan	The Order of Military Merit (Grand Cordon)

== Gallery ==
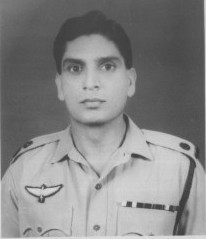
Commanding an SSG company

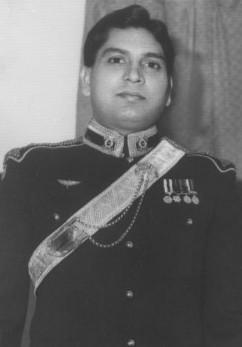
As a Lieutenant Colonel

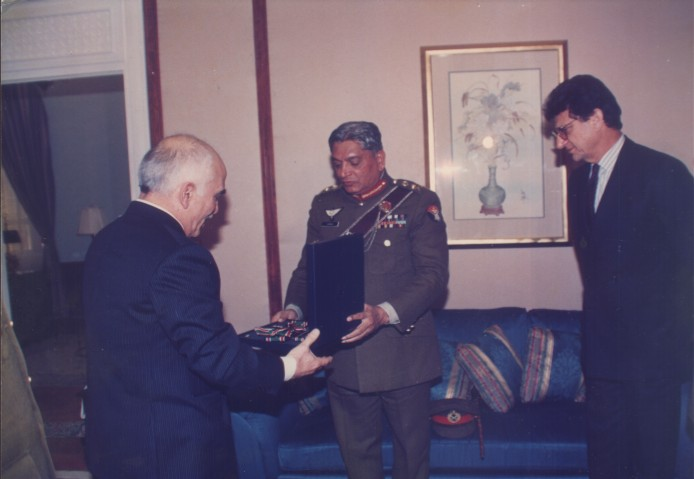
Receiving the highest military award of Jordan

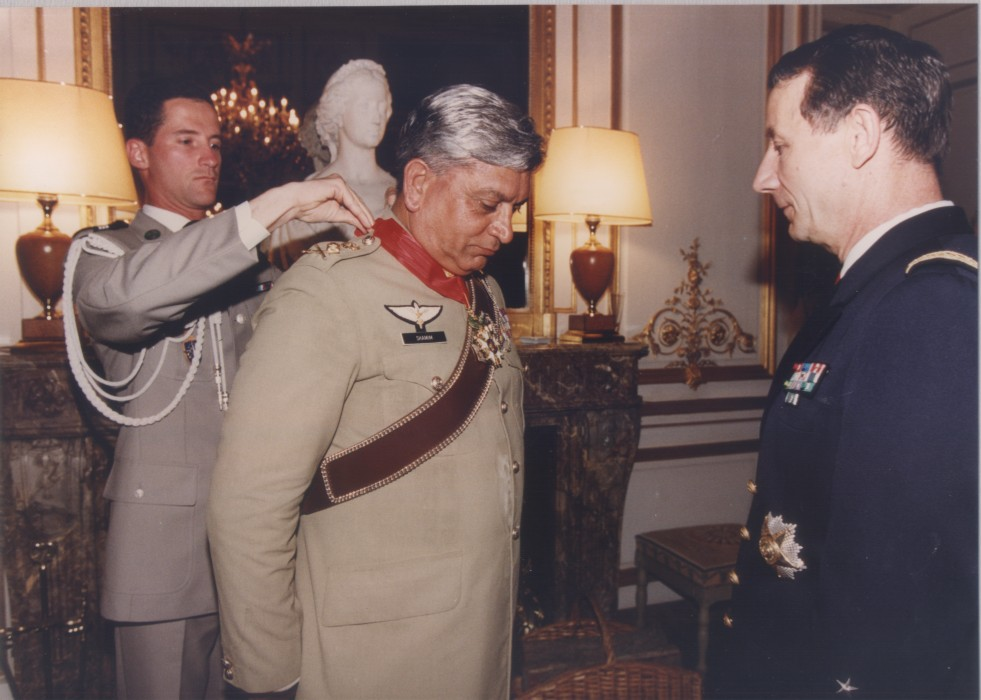
Receiving the National Order of the Legion of Honour

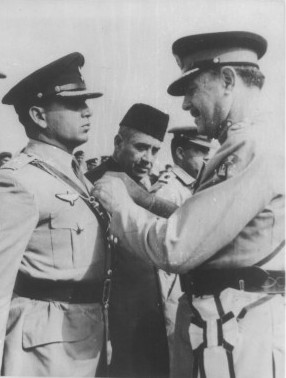
Receiving the Sitara-e-Jurat

The Sitara-e-Jurat

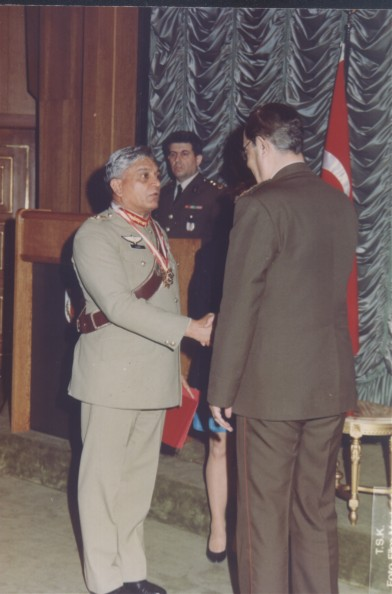
Receiving the Turkish Armed Forces Medal of Honor

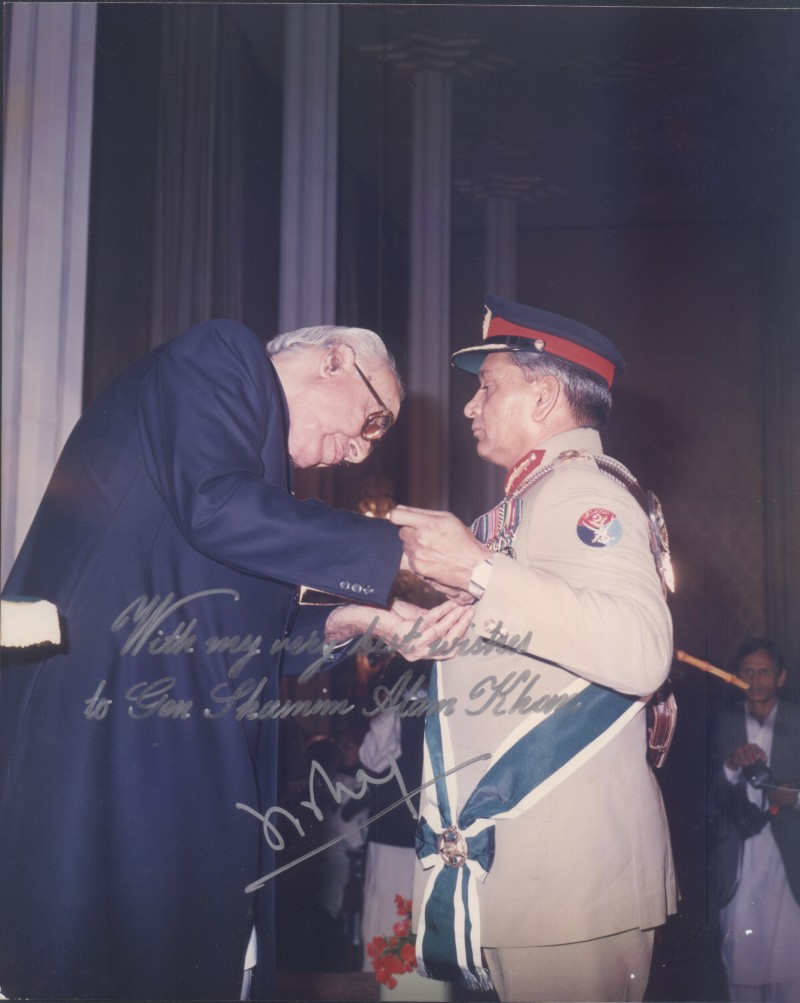
Receiving the Nishan-e-Imtiaz

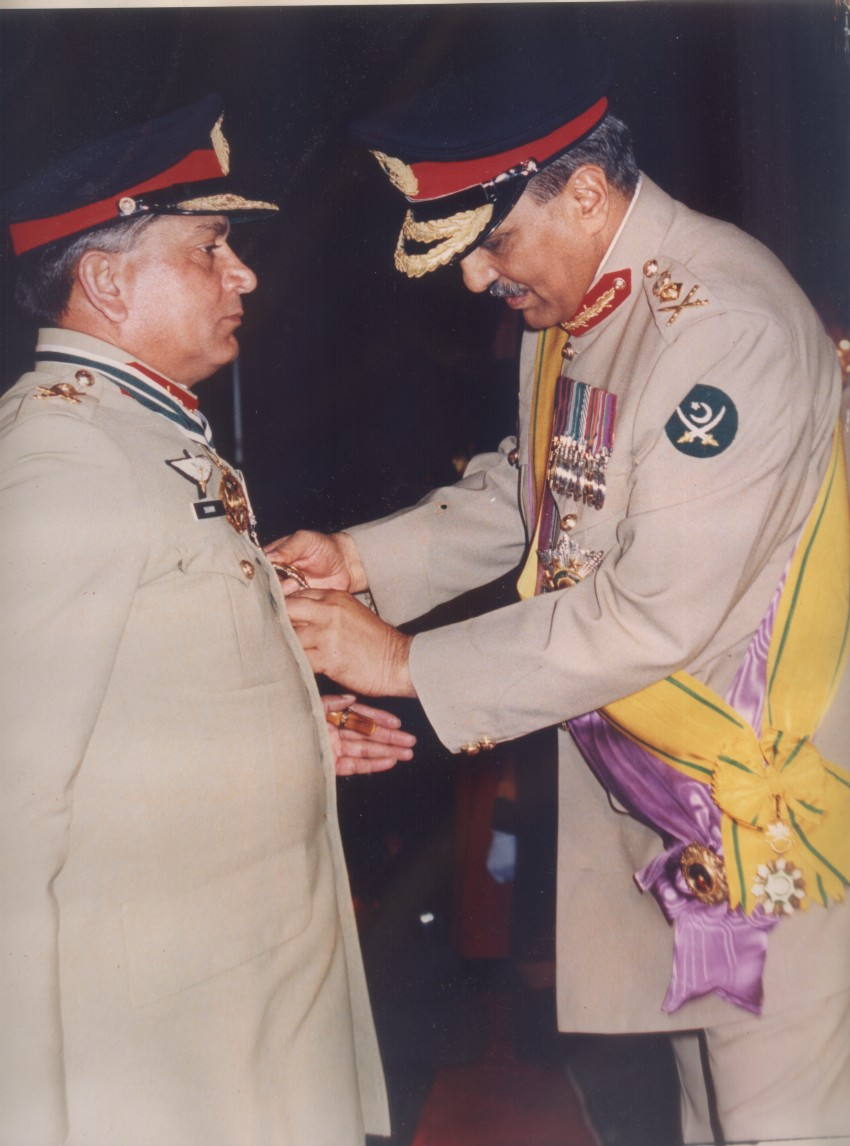
Receiving the Hilal-i-Imtiaz

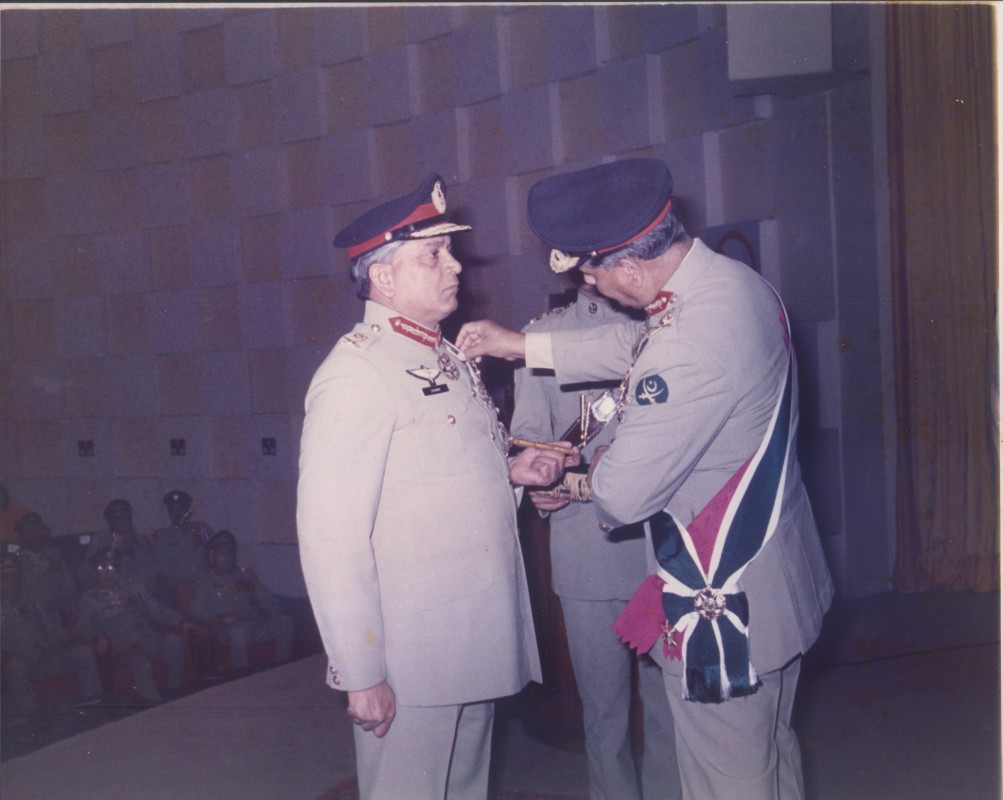
Receiving the Sitar-e-Basalat

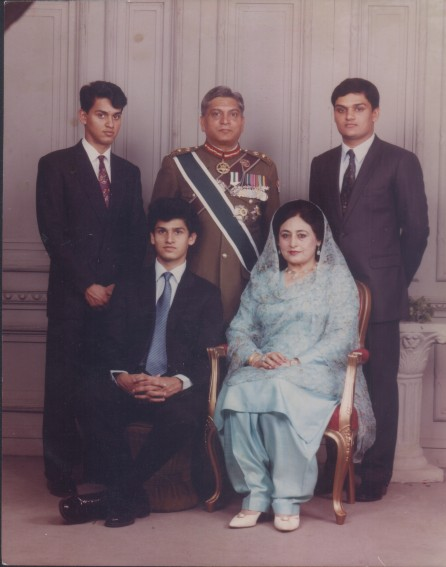
Family of Shamim Alam Khan

Military offices
Preceded by Mian Muhammad Afzaal	Chief of General Staff; 1989 – 1991	Succeeded by Asif Nawaz
Preceded by Iftikhar Ahmed Sirohey	Chairman Joint Chiefs of Staff Committee; 1991 – 1994	Succeeded by Farooq Feroze Khan
