= Order of Military Merit (Jordan) =

Order of Military Merit Wisam al-Istahaqaq al-Askari

Awarded by Jordan
- Type: Order
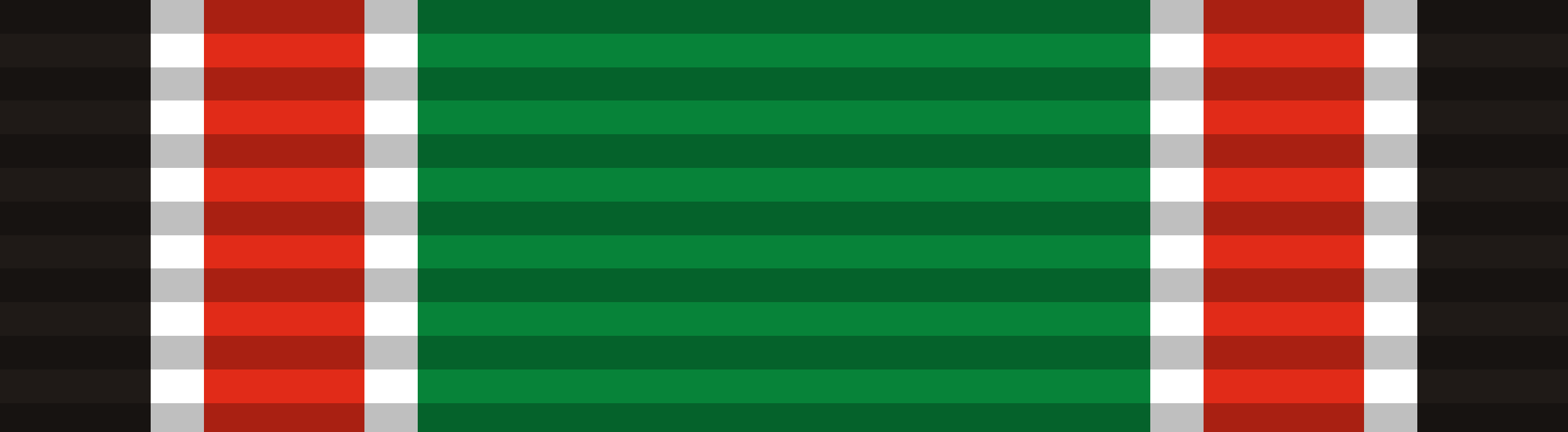
- Ribbon: Ribbon of the Order of Military Merit
- Status: Currently constituted
- Sovereign: Abdullah II of Jordan
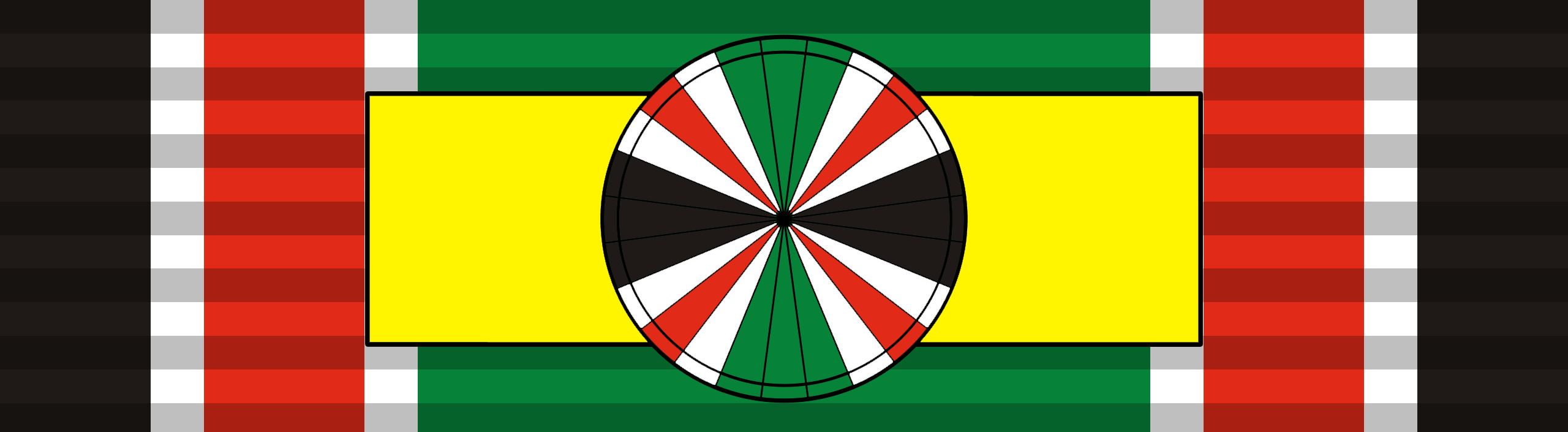
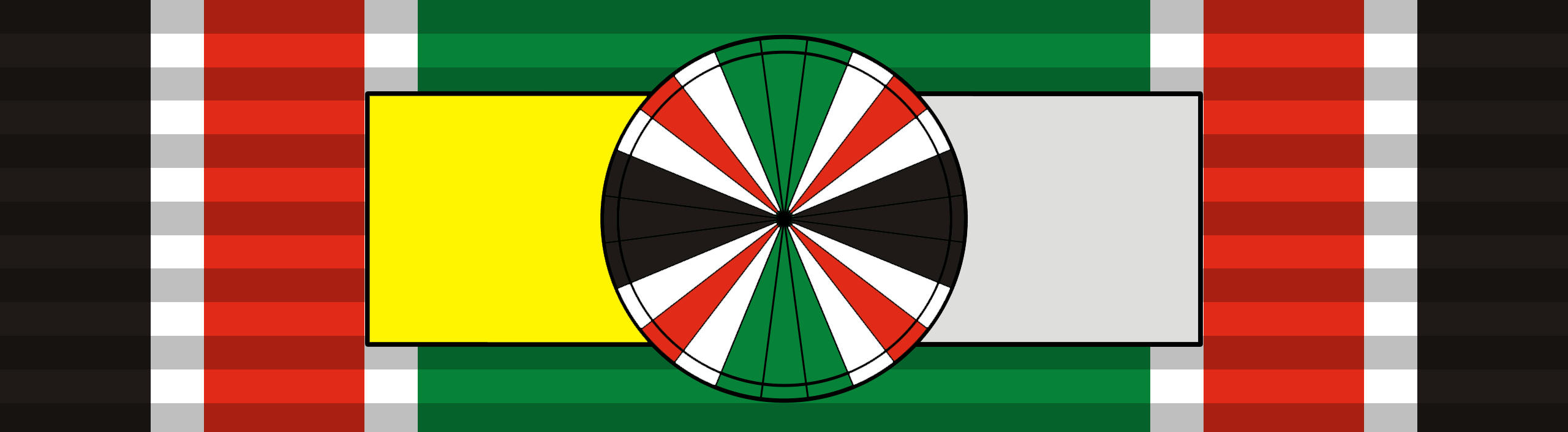
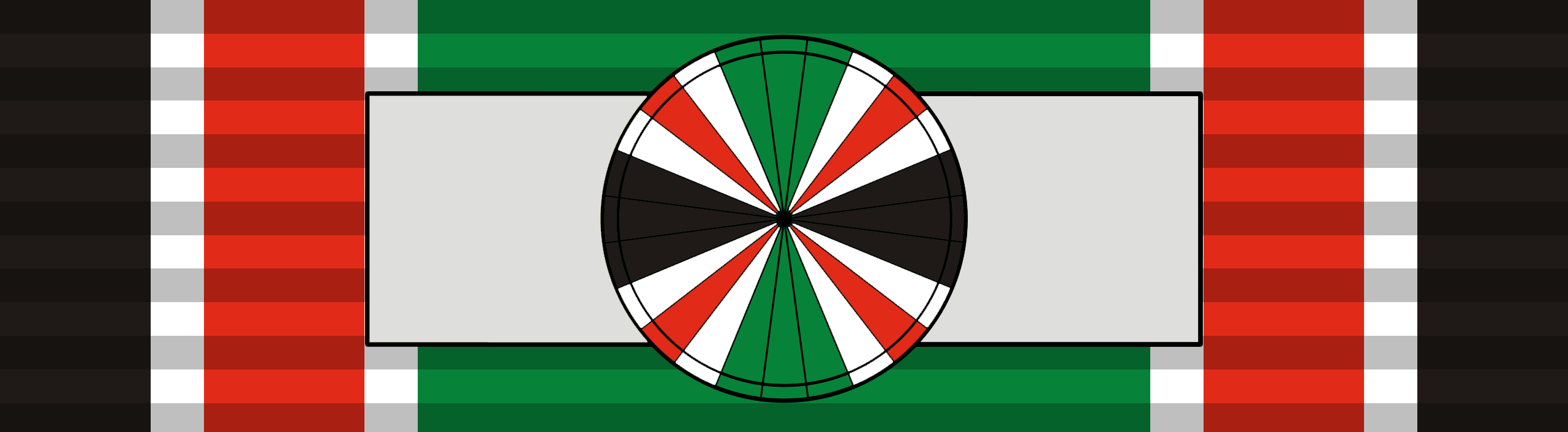
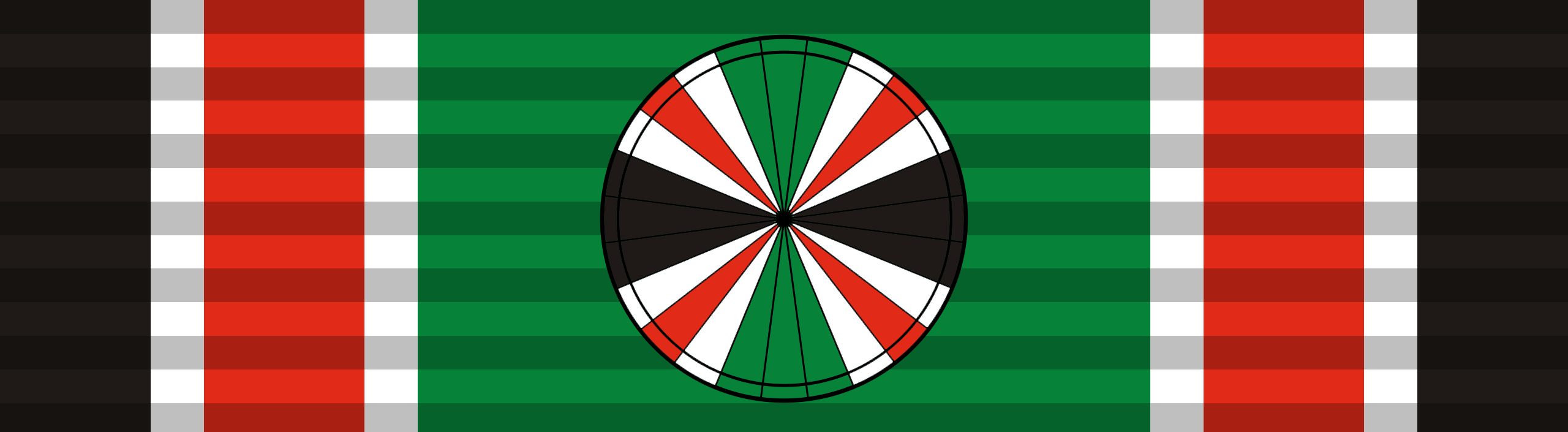
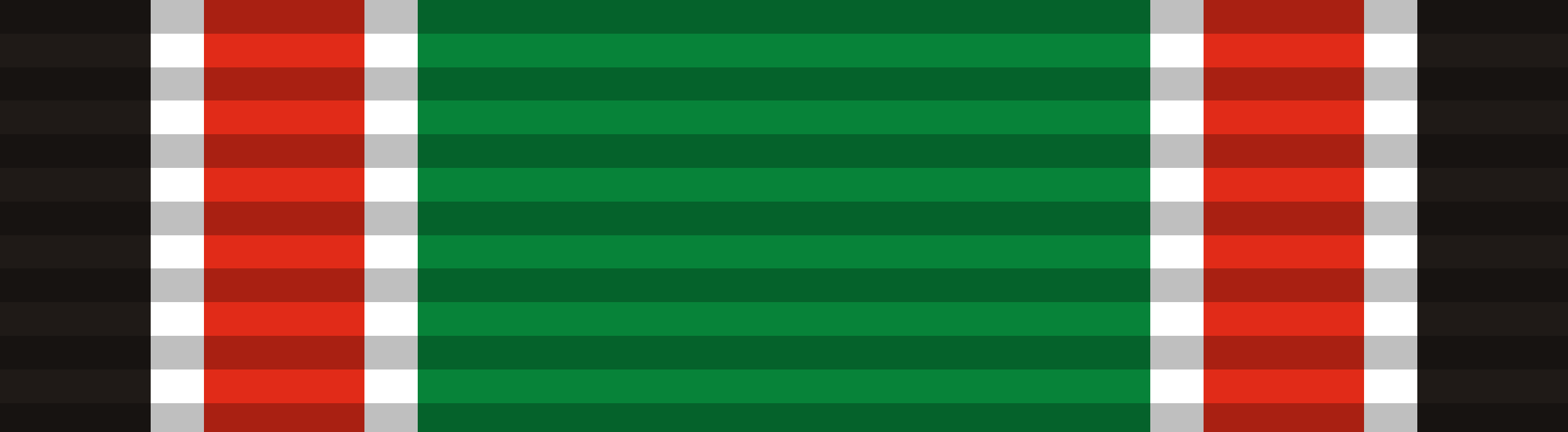
- Grades: Grand Cordon Grand Officer Commander Officer Knight

Precedence
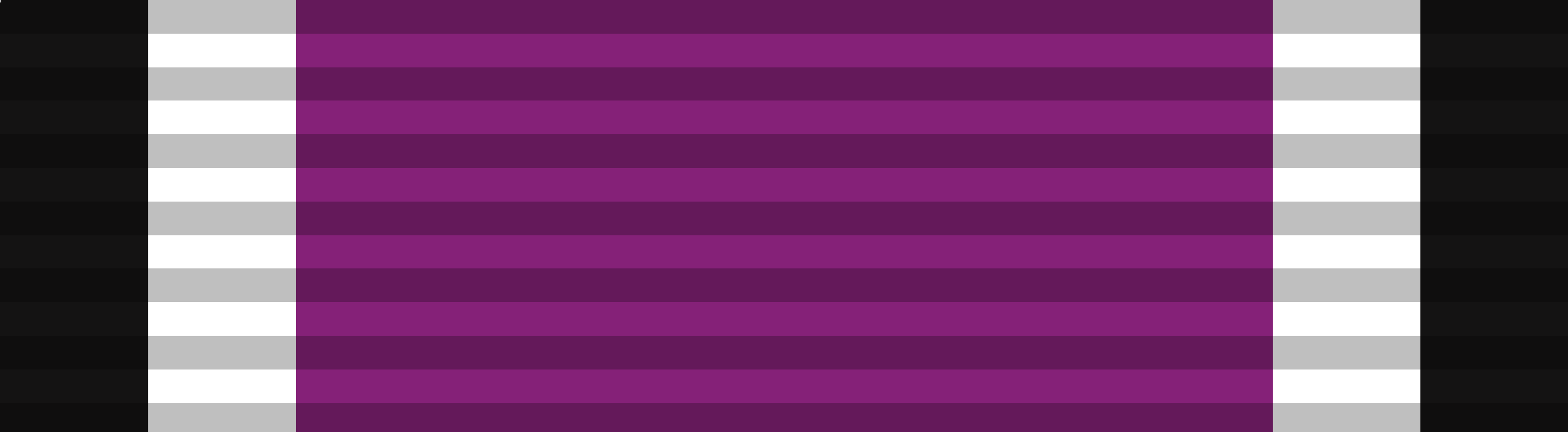
- Next (higher): Order of Independence (Jordan)

The Order of Military Merit (Wisam al-Istahaqaq al-Askari) is an order of the Kingdom of Jordan.

== History ==
It was instituted in 1976 by King Hussein bin Talal.

The Order of Military Merit is awarded for distinguished services by members of the Jordanian armed forces and foreign military officials. Civilians may also receive the order in reward for exceptional services in the defence of the Kingdom.

== Grades ==
The Order of Military Merit is awarded in five classes:

- Grand Cordon: awarded to general officers and above.
- Grand Officer: awarded to full colonels and above.
- Commander: awarded to field officers and above.
- Officer: awarded to officers below field rank.
- Knight: awarded to other ranks.

The Order of Military Merit is divided in five classes:

The Order of Military Merit Service Ribbons
Grand Cordon	Grand Officer	Commander	Officer	Knight

== Notable recipients ==
- Anwar Shamim, former Chief of Air Staff 1978–1985
- Shamim Alam Khan, former Chairman Joint Chief of Staff 1991–1994
- Farooq Feroze Khan, former Chairman Joint Chief of Staff (1994–1997) and Chief of Air Staff 1991–1994
- Abbas Khattak, former Chief of Air Staff (Pakistan) 1994–1997
- Jehangir Karamat, former Chief of Army Staff 1996–1998
- Fasih Bokhari, former Chief of Naval Staff 1997–1999
- Aziz Khan, former Chairman Joint Chief of Staff 2001–2004
- Raheel Sharif, Chief of Army Staff 2013–2016
- Qamar Javed Bajwa, former Chief of Army Staff 2016–2022
- Nadeem Raza, former Chairman Joint Chief of Staff 2019–2022
- Majed Al-Hajhassan, former Brigadier General of the Jordanian Armed Forces and ambassador
- Asim Munir, current Chief of Army Staff (Pakistan) 2022–
