= Farooq Feroze Khan =

Chief of Air Staff of Pakistani Air Force (1939–2021)

Farooq Feroze Khan NI(M) HI(M) SI(M) SBt LOM
- فاروق فيروز خان

8th Chairman Joint Chiefs of Staff Committee
- In office 10 November 1994 – 9 November 1997
- Preceded by: General Shamim Alam Khan
- Succeeded by: General Jehangir Karamat

6th Chief of Air Staff
- In office 9 March 1991 – 8 November 1994
- Preceded by: Hakimullah Khan Durrani
- Succeeded by: Abbas Khattak

Managing Director Pakistan International Airlines
- In office 1990 – 9 March 1991

President Pakistan Hockey Federation
- In office 1990 – 9 March 1991
- Preceded by: Azim Daudpota
- Succeeded by: Nawaz Tiwana

Personal details
- Born: 17 August 1939 Bombay, Bombay Presidency, British India
- Died: 9 October 2021 (aged 82) Islamabad, Pakistan
- Parent: Feroze Khan (father)
- Education: St. Patrick's High School, Karachi; PAF College Sargodha; PAF Academy; USAF Academy
- Nickname(s): Feroze Khan, Jr. Feroz; Starfighter; Feroz Khan II

Military service
- Branch/service: Pakistan Air Force
- Years of service: 1956–1997
- Rank: Air Chief Marshal
- Unit: No. 9 Squadron PAF
- Commands: Vice Chief of Air Staff; DCAS (Air Operations); ACAS (Plans); AOC Southern Air Command; AOC Central Air Command
- Battles/wars: Indo-Pakistani War of 1965; Indo-Pakistani War of 1971
- Awards: See list

Farooq Feroze Khan Burki (Note: Urdu: فاروق فيروز خان) (17 August 1939 – 9 October 2021), also known as Feroze Khan, was a Pakistani four-star air officer who served as the sixth Chief of Air Staff of the Pakistan Air Force from 1991 to 1994 and eighth Chairman Joint Chiefs of Staff Committee from 1994 to 1997.

His career in the Air Force is subjected to distinction as he was the only air force officer whose career spanned more than 40 years of military service. He was also the only Air Force officer to be appointed Chairman Joint Chiefs of Staff Committee.

== Biography ==
=== Early life and career in the military ===
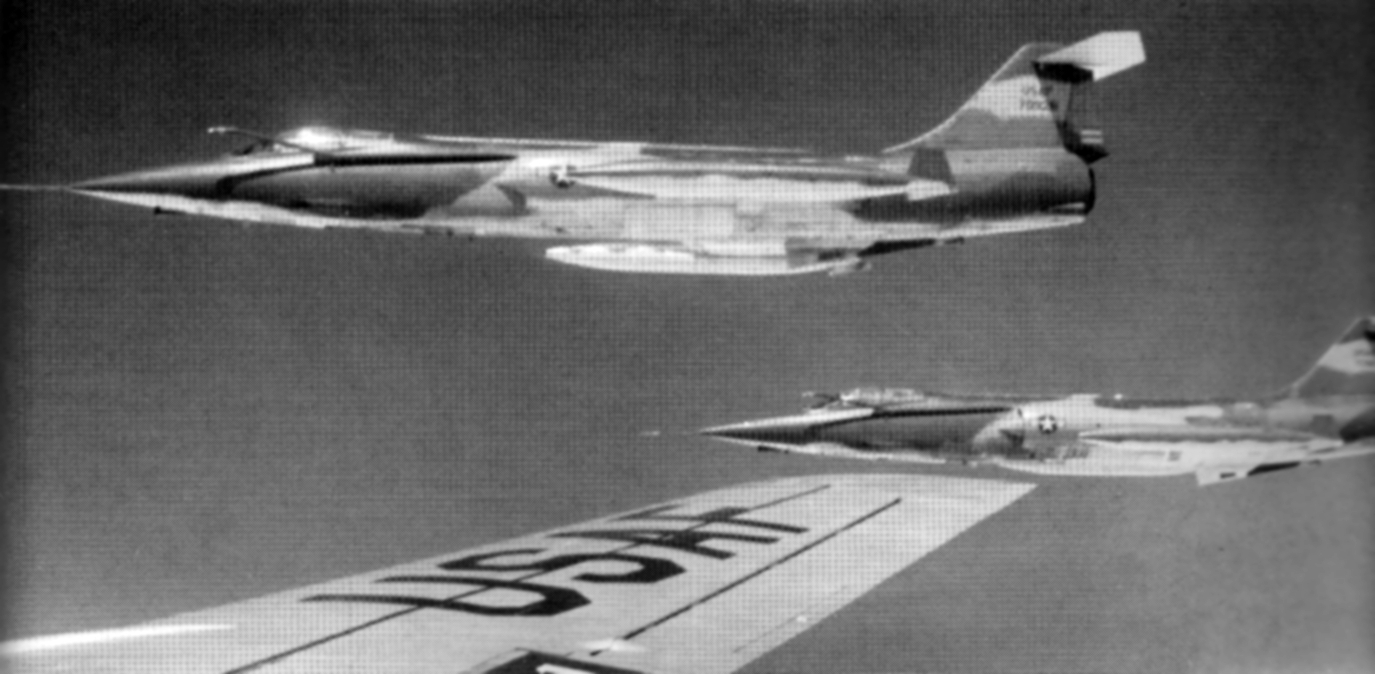
An F-104 Starfighter in flight: Feroze Khan flew the aircraft in various combat missions during the 1965 war with India.

Farooq Feroze Khan was born in Bombay on 17 August 1939. His family belonged to the Burki tribe of Pashtun (Pathan), hailing from Jalandhar. His father, Feroze Khan Sr., was a professional field hockey player who won the Olympic gold medal for India and after the Partition of British India in 1947, played for the Pakistan National Hockey Team.

Feroze was educated at the PAF Public School Sargodha where he completed his Senior Cambridge, and joined the Pakistan Air Force in 1956. He was sent to attend the PAF Academy in Risalpur, but later selected as one of few cadets to attend the United States Air Force Academy in Colorado. Upon completing the pilot training program from the USAF Academy, Feroze commissioned as a Pilot officer in the No. 9 Squadron PAF in January 1959.

In the United States, he trained as a fighter pilot on the F-104 Starfighter. He was known for his skills while maneuvering the aircraft in a combat mode from a subsonic to supersonic speed. While in the United States, Flt-Lt. Feroze Khan served as an exchange officer with the United States Air Force, completing several years of aerial combat training with American pilots. Upon returning in the 1960s, he was attached to the Royal Air Force as a military liaison officer, and flew British aircraft.

In 1965, Squadron Leader Feroze flew on his F-104 Starfighter on various combat missions against the Indian Air Force during the Indo-Pakistani Air War of 1965. After the war, Sq-Ldr. Feroze was sent to join the No. 5 Squadron PAF, which later formed the PAF's aerobatics team, Sherdils, where he displayed his skills while flying the F-104, alongside the F-86 Sabre flown by Flight lieutenant Cecil Chaudhry.

In 1966–67, Squadron Leader Feroze was among the first group of fighter pilots who were sent to France for their conversion from American F-104 Starfighters to French Dassault Mirage III's. After his conversion, Sqn. Ldr. Feroze was posted as an air adviser to the Eastern Air Command in East Pakistan, providing mission support to conduct combat air patrol near the Kalaikunda Air Force Station near the Eastern front of India.

In 1971, Sqn. Ldr. Feroze, now flying the Mirage-III, participated in preemptive airstrikes in India, which eventually led to the third war with India.

=== Death ===
Farooq Feroze died due to cardiac arrest in Islamabad on 9 October 2021 at the age of 82.

== War and command appointments ==
After the third war with India in 1971, Wing-Commander Feroze joined the faculty of the Combat Commanders' School in Sargodha, instructing pilots on the methods of combat flight. During this time, Wg-Cdr. Feroze was posted in the Pakistan Armed Forces–Middle East Command, briefly commanding a fighter wing in the United Arab Emirates Air Force for nearly three years.

In 1982–83, Air-Commodore Feroze was elevated as the base commander of the PAF Base Sargodha, witnessing the introduction of American-built F-16s. In 1984–85, Air-Cdre. Feroze was promoted to the two-star promotion when Air Vice-Marshal Feroze was appointed AOC of the Southern Air Command based in Karachi, and later as the Central Air Command based in Sargodha. In 1988, Air Vice Marshal Feroze, serving as the Deputy Chief of the Air Staff (Operations) was elevated to the three-star rank when he was appointed the Vice Chief of the Air Staff (VCAS) under Air Chief Marshal Hakimullah Khan Durrani. During this time, Air-Marshal Feroze took an interest and participated in board of inquiry that investigated the mysterious circumstances involved in the death of President Zia-ul-Haq.

In 1990, Air-Mshl. Feroze was taken on secondment by Prime Minister Benazir Bhutto as Managing Director of the Pakistan International Airlines, until 1991.

== Chief of Air staff ==
On 9 March 1991, Prime Minister Nawaz Sharif promoted Air-Mshl. Feroze to the four-star rankof Air Chief Marshal (ACM) and the new Chief of Air Staff (CAS). ACM Feroze assumed the command of the Air Force at a difficult time, when the military embargo by the United States on a suspicion of a covert nuclear weapons program was enforced. During this time, he launched the program to acquire the license to reproduce the Australian Mirage-III and induction of F-7P from China at the Pakistan Aeronautical Complex (PAC).

In 1994, ACM Feroze was given a one-year extension to continue serving as air chief.

== Chairman joint chiefs ==
In 1994, the extension made him the most senior military officer in the Pakistani military but this became a subject of controversy in the Air Force, when many senior air officers showed resentment towards this decision taken by the Benazir Bhutto Government. Upon the retirement of Gen. Shamim Alam Khan on 8 November 1994, Prime Minister Benazir Bhutto approved ACM Feroze to Chairman Joint Chiefs of Staff Committee—this was the first time the chairmanship was rotated to the Air Force since its inception in 1976.

As Chairman Joint Chiefs, ACM Feroze attempted to procure the MiG-29F and the Sukhoi Su-27 aircraft from the Eastern Europe as well as Mirage 2000 from Qatar, with a view to replacing the F-16s but this was met with strong opposition from ACM Khattak, the air chief, who was unimpressed with the war performances of Russian fighter jets. In 1995, Gen. Feroze Khan also provided his crucial military support and political advocacy for the development of the Shaheen program with a view to keeping the second-strike capability.

His tenure as Chairman joint chiefs is criticized by the defense observer in the country for not being able to take steps in strengthening the role of Joint Chiefs of Staff Committee, and was largely seen as ineffective and unable to provide any military or political advice to Prime Minister Benazir Bhutto and her administration on a longer extension— the void was filled by then-army chief, Gen. Jehangir Karamat.

Critics observed that ACM Feroze's preference of "flying solo" and his nature of working alone further complicated the matters in the military that required the comprehensive collaboration and teamwork in national security issues. According to the critical paper penned by defense analyst, Ikram Sehgal, "ACM Feroze marked ineffectiveness in the post of Chairman and its institution."

Upon retiring on 9 November 1997, Gen. Jehangir Karamat was eventually appointed to replace him and who took the role of the Joint Chiefs of Staff Committee to new heights and took the four-tiered military into a responsive and efficient fighting machine in the 21st century. His uniform was placed in the PAF Museum, Karachi, where he was retired in his estate.

== Awards and decorations ==
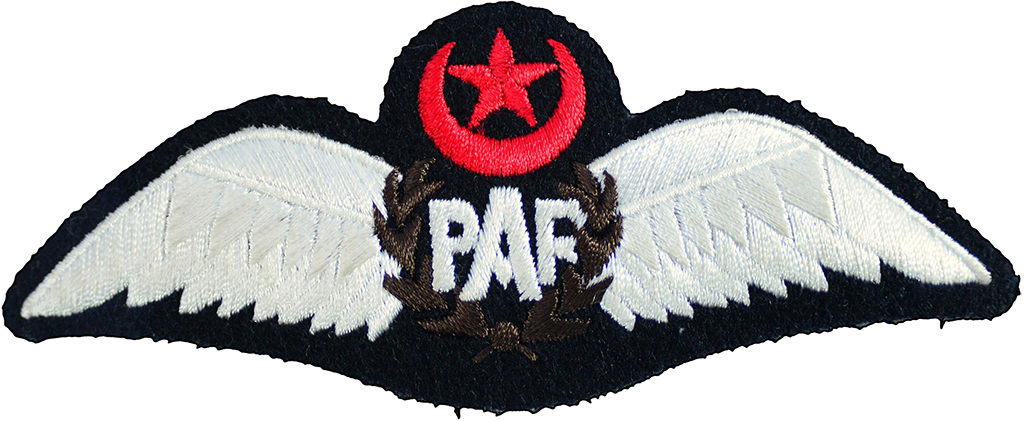

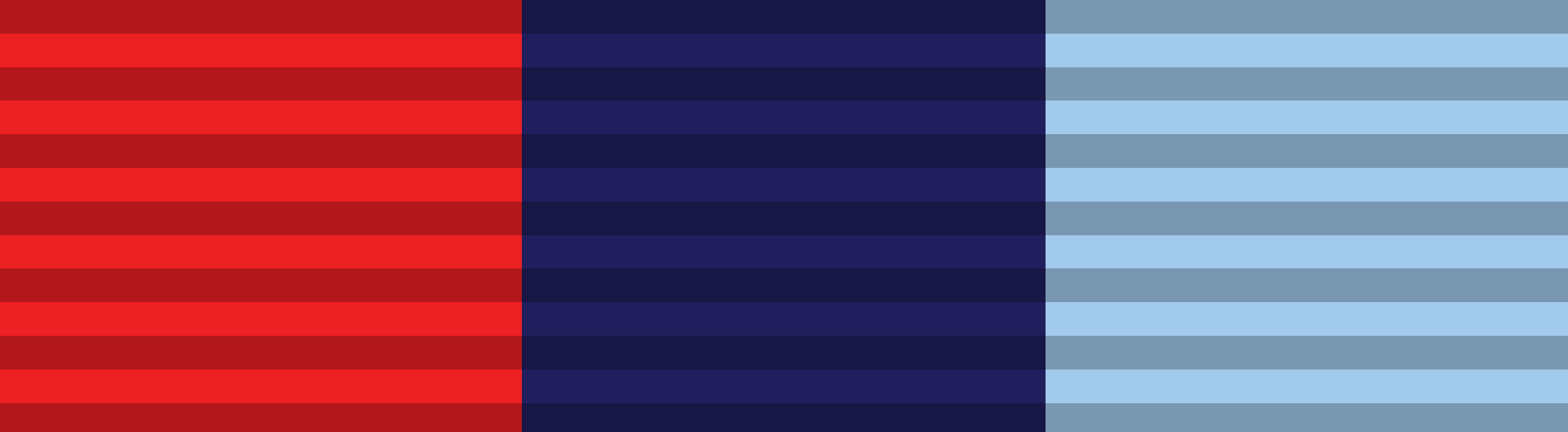

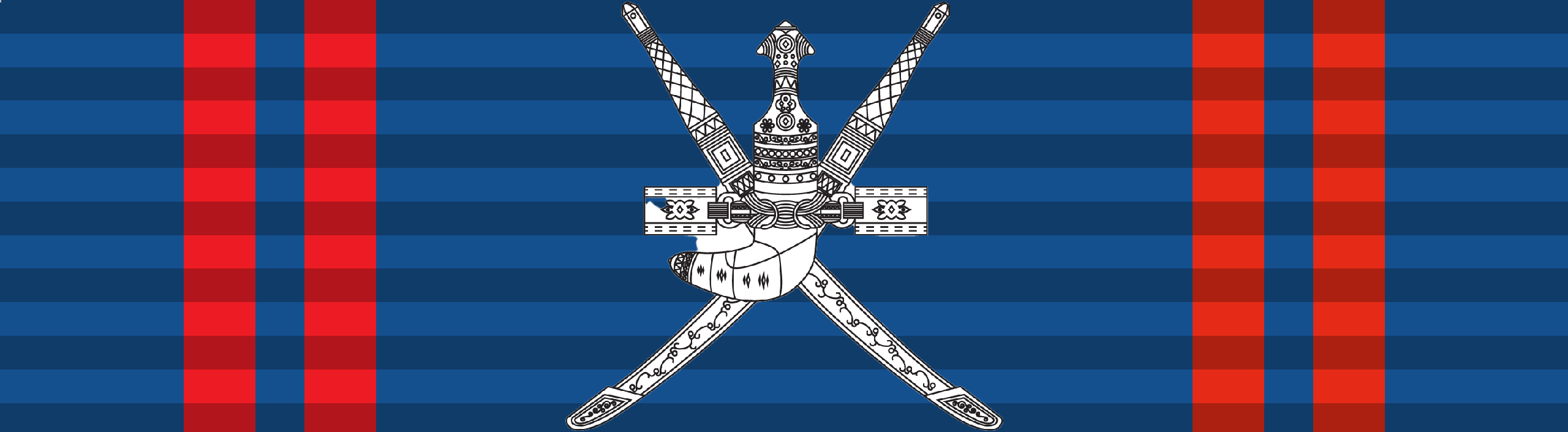

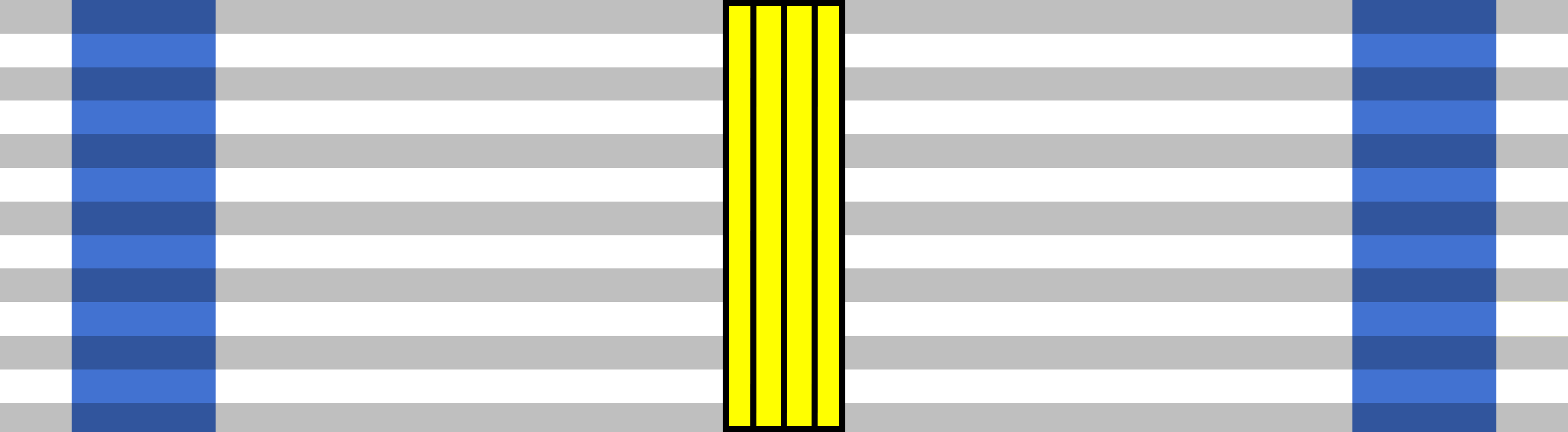

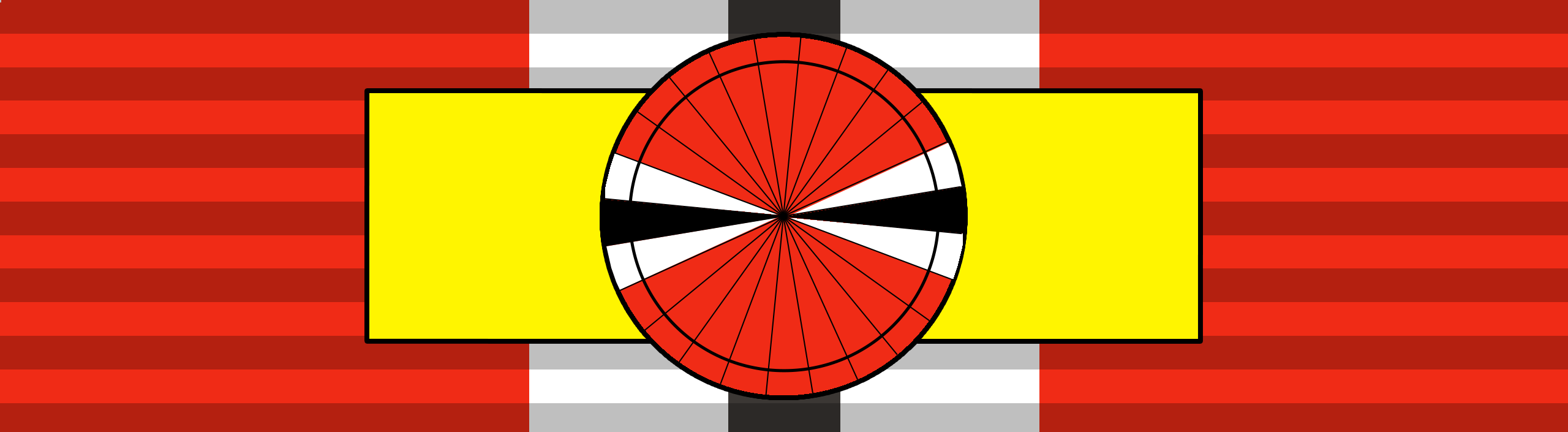

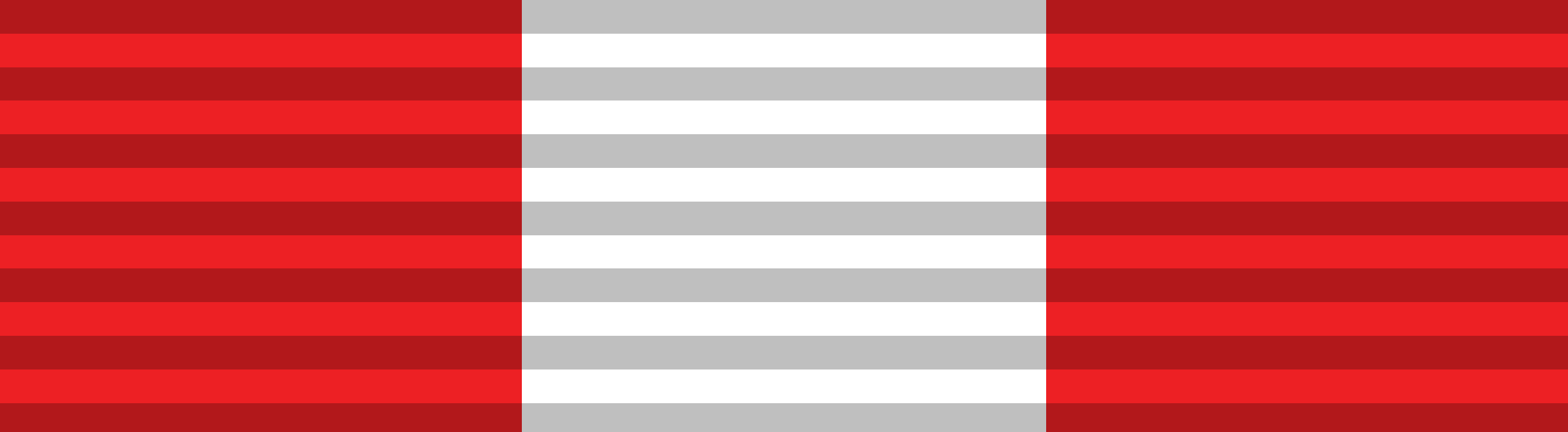

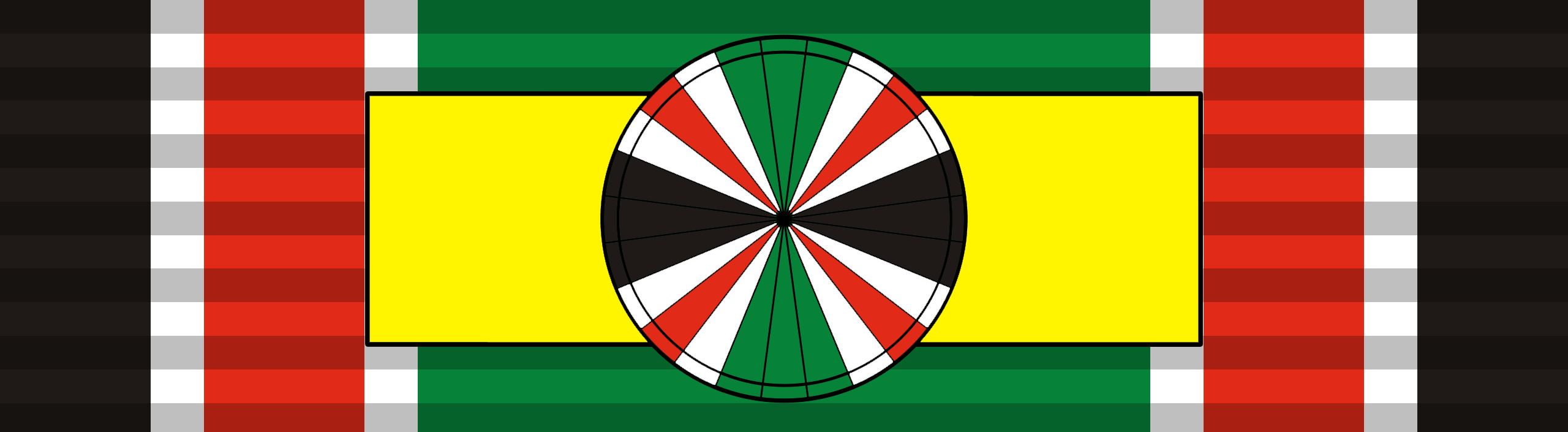

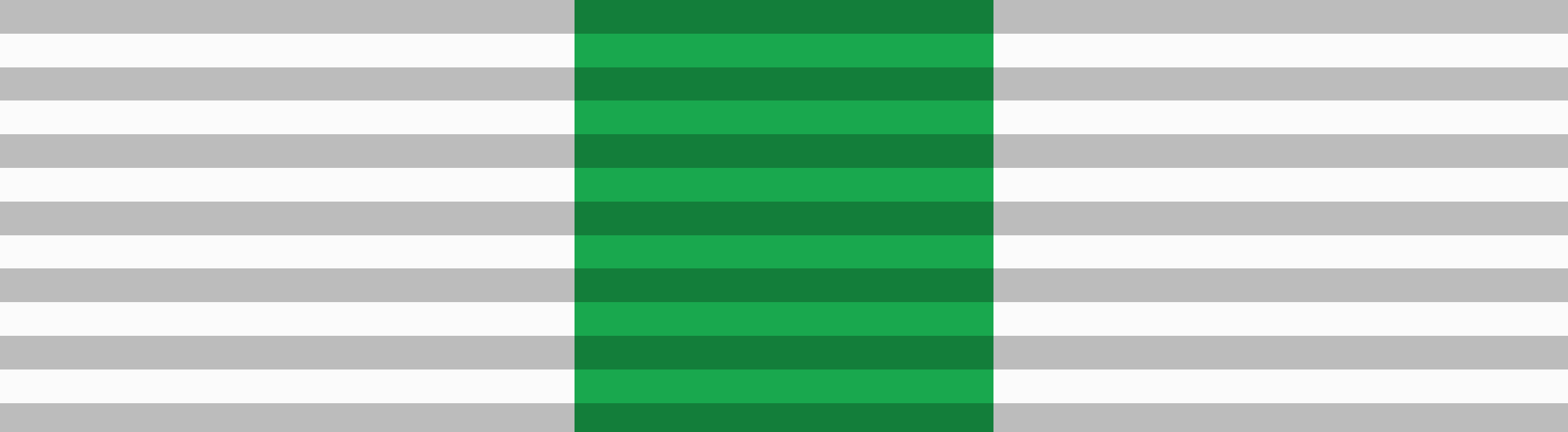

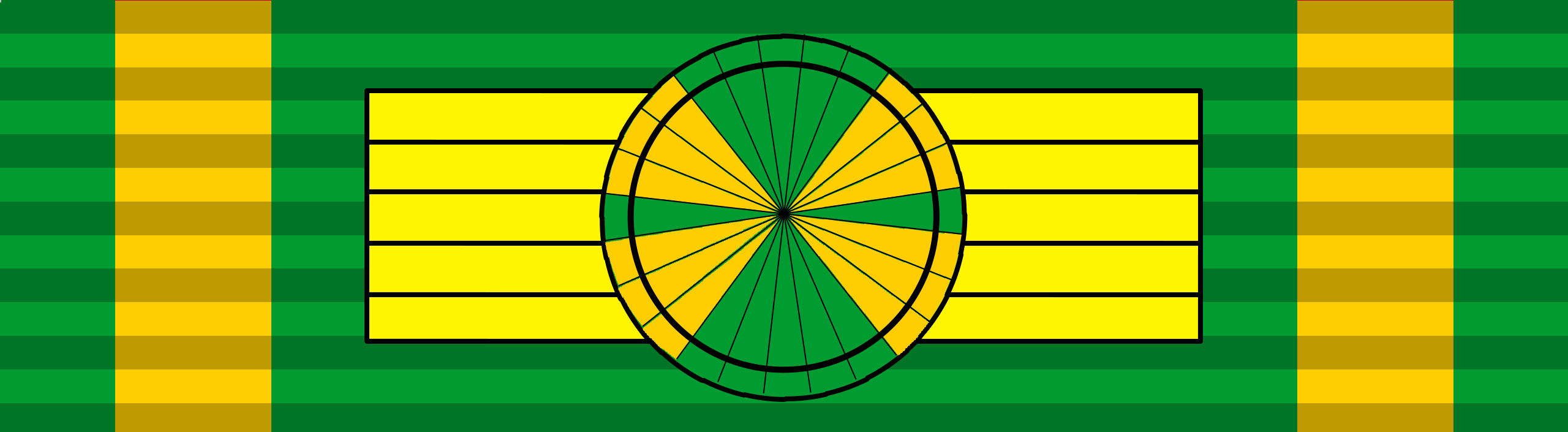

PAF GD(P) Badge RED (More than 3000 Flying Hours)
Nishan-e-Imtiaz (Military) (Order of Excellence)		Hilal-i-Imtiaz (Military) (Crescent of Excellence)	
Sitara-i-Imtiaz (Military) (Star of Excellence)	Sitara-e-Basalat (Star of Valour)	Sitara-e-Harb 1965 War (War Star 1965)	Sitara-e-Harb 1971 War (War Star 1971)
Tamgha-e-Jang 1965 War (War Medal 1965)	Tamgha-e-Jang 1971 War (War Medal 1971)	10 Years Service Medal	20 Years Service Medal
30 Years Service Medal	40 Years Service Medal	Tamgha-e-Sad Saala Jashan-e-Wiladat-e-Quaid-e-Azam (100th Birth Anniversary of Muhammad Ali Jinnah) 1976	Hijri Tamgha (Hijri Medal) 1979
Tamgha-e-Jamhuriat (Democracy Medal) 1988	Qarardad-e-Pakistan Tamgha (Resolution Day Golden Jubilee Medal) 1990	Tamgha-e-Salgirah Pakistan (Independence Day Golden Jubilee Medal) 1997	Military Order of Oman Class I (Oman)
Conseil International du Sport Militaire Medal of Merit (Grand Knight)	King Hamad Order of the Renaissance Class I (Bahrain)	Order of Merit of the Republic of Turkey (Turkey)	Legion of Merit (Degree of Commander) (USA)
Order of Military Merit (Jordan) Grand Cordon	Order of Civil Merit of the Syrian Arab Republic (Wisam al Istehqaq) (Syria)	Aeronautical Medal (France)	Order of Abdulaziz al Saud (1st Class) (Saudi Arabia)

=== Foreign Decorations ===
Foreign Awards
Oman	Military Order of Oman - Class I
	CISM Medal of Merit - Grand Knight
Bahrain	The Order of Bahrain - Class I
Turkey	Turkish Legion of Merit
USA	The Legion of Merit (Degree of Commander)
Jordan	The Order of Military Merit
Syria	Order of Merit (Wisam al Istehqaq)
France	Aeronautical Medal
Saudi Arabia	Order of King Abdul Aziz (1st Class)

== See also ==
- Pakistan-United States military relations

== Notes ==
Military offices
Preceded by Hakimullah	Chief of Air Staff; 1991–1994	Succeeded by Abbas Khattak
Preceded by Shamim Alam Khan	Chairman Joint Chiefs of Staff Committee; 1994–1997	Succeeded by Jehangir Karamat
