= Exercise Saffron Bandit =

Live firing exercise by Pakistan Airforce

- Type: Military exercise
- Planned by: Directorate-General for Air Operations
- Objective: Assess and improve combat efficiency of PAF squadrons.
- Date: First held in 1990.
- Executed by: Pakistan Air Force

Exercise Saffron Bandit is a major "command level" combat training exercise, usually held either bi-annually or tri-annually, by the Pakistan Air Force (PAF) in Pakistan. The initial targets, mainstream goals and purpose of the exercise are focused specifically on the threat from India, particularly that emanating from the Indian Air Force.

== History ==
Initially the PAF's Combat Commanders School (CCS) was tasked with annual visits to each PAF fighter squadron to assess and improve their combat skills. CCS is an aerial combat and attack training school set up in 1976 to develop new aerial combat and attack tactics, and train PAF pilots.

In June 1990 the Squadron Combat Upgradation Programme (SCUP) was initiated. The SCUP exercise saw the CCS pilots working with air defence weapon controllers and two fighter squadrons for a month. SCUP was concluded in October 1990 after four monthly cycles.

In September 1992, the new exercise "Saffron Bandit" was initiated by then Deputy Chief of the Air Staff (Ops) Air Vice Marshal Shafique Hyder and Assistant Chief of the Air Staff (Ops) Air Commodore Zahid Anis. The CCS continued to oversee the exercise and was to provide detailed reports on operational strengths and weaknesses at the field level. During the 1990s four such exercises were held: 1992, 1994, 1997 and 14 May 1999.

== Recent exercises ==
External videos
- Inauguration ceremony of Saffron Bandit 2009-10.

=== Saffron Bandit 2009-10 ===
Launched on 5 September 2009. For the first time a "special counter-insurgency training program" was included in the exercise. It was also reported that PAF could have a response time of 3 minutes to aerial intrusions. Unmanned aerial vehicles were employed for the first time to assist with targeting, improve precision and prevent civilian casualties. It was also stated that "an important aspect of the exercise was the successful streamlining of the joint force application concept in future battle scenarios." After participation by all combat aircraft squadrons of the PAF, in sequence over seven months, the exercise was concluded on 22 February 2010.

=== Saffron Bandit 2017 ===
Prime Minister of Pakistan Shahid Khaqan Abbasi flew a fighter aircraft as co-pilot during Exercise Saffron Bandit on September 9, 2017. He participated Exercise Saffron Bandit 2017 by flying F-16 Fighter aircraft.

A larger exercise, named "Exercise High Mark", is the PAF's largest and most comprehensive exercise and is held after a period of several years. Recently it has been transformed into a joint exercise with the Pakistan Army (PA).

== See also ==
- Pakistan Air Force
