= May 2014 Waziristan airstrikes =

- Part of the War in North-West Pakistan
Date	21–27 May 2014
Location	Waziristan
Result	Pakistani victory

Belligerents
Pakistan	Tehrik-i-Taliban Pakistan; Al Qaeda; Islamic Movement of Uzbekistan; Turkistan Islamic Party

Commanders and leaders
(Pakistan) Nawaz Sharif	Hakimullah Mehsud

Units involved
Pakistan Air Force; Pakistan Army: Army Aviation	Tehrik-i-Taliban Pakistan; Al Qaeda; Islamic Movement of Uzbekistan; Turkistan Islamic Party

Casualties and losses
None	64–72 killed 33+ wounded
- 30+ civilians killed Thousands of civilians displaced

May 2014 Waziristan strikes refers to an airstrike campaign by Pakistan against Pakistani Taliban and foreign insurgents presence in the tribal area of Waziristan.

== Background ==
North Waziristan was a hotspot for terrorist activities as it had a substantial insurgent presence, especially foreign fighters who were involved in multiple attacks against Pakistan. American and Chinese pressure was high on Pakistani government to curb these insurgents. On May 19, 2014, one such incident claimed the lives of 9 Pakistani soldiers and provoked the airstrikes.

== Strikes ==
=== May 21 ===
On May 21, 2014, Pakistani military launched an airstrike campaign against insurgents in Waziristan region killing over 60 militants and wounding over 30. According to Pakistani military many foreign fighters including Uyghur, Chechens, Uzbeks and Arabs were killed. Multiple commanders were killed in the airstrikes. The stroke targeted Mir Ali and Miranshah, near the Afghan border. Large weapons and ammunition caches were destroyed in the airstrikes. There was a huge backlash by the locals who alleged that Pakistan is committing atrocities against its own citizens in the name of fighting terrorism while Pakistani establishment itself shelters terrorists. At least 30 civilians were also killed in the airstrikes.

=== May 24 ===
On May 24, a helicopter raid on a Taliban outpost killed 4 and wounded 3. Fifteen civilians were also killed in the airstrikes.

The airstrikes had a massive impact on the area with thousands fleeing the dire situation. Furthermore, claims arose of the destruction of 500 homes in the aerial campaign.

== Ceasefire ==
A curfew was imposed on the region. Thousands fled from the region following the airstrikes. The aerial campaign ended on May 27 after the protests from the locals.

== Aftermath ==
There was increase in anti-government sentiment in the area especially due to heavy civilian casualties. There was a surge is terror activities in FATA targeting military installations.
