= Pakistan Air Force =

Aerial service branch of the Pakistan Armed Forces

- پاک فِضائیہ, Pāk Fìzāʾiyah
- Badge of the Pakistan Air Force
- Founded: 14 August 1947; 79 years ago
- Country: Pakistan
- Type: Air force
- Role: Aerial warfare
- Size: 70,000 total active personnel; 8,000 reserve
- Part of: Pakistan Armed Forces
- Headquarters: Air Headquarters (AHQ), Sector E-9, Islamabad
- Mottos: Urdu: قوم کا سرمایہ افتخار; "A symbol of pride for the nation" (ISPR official); Persian: صحراست که دریاست ته بال و پر ماست; "Be it deserts or seas; all lie under our wings" (traditional)
- Colours
- Anniversaries: Air Force Day: 7 September
- Aerial engagements: Major conflicts and wartime operations: Indo-Pakistani Wars and Conflicts; Indo-Pakistani War of 1947–49; Indo-Pakistani War of 1965; Indo-Pakistani Air War of 1965; Bangladesh Independence War; East Pakistan Air Operations; Indo-Pakistani War of 1971; 1999 Kargil War; 2001–02 India–Pakistan standoff; 2008 India–Pakistan standoff; 2019 India–Pakistan standoff; 2025 India–Pakistan conflict Arab Cold War; Al-Wadiah War Conflicts in the Middle East; 1967 Arab-Israeli War; 1973 Arab-Israeli War; Gulf War; Pakistan Armed Forces deployments in Saudi Arabia Durand Line Conflict; Afghanistan–Pakistan border conflicts; Waziristan rebellion of 1948-1954; 1949 Mughalgai raid; Bajaur Campaign; Post Taliban takeover clashes; 2022 Pakistani airstrikes in Afghanistan; 2024 Pakistani airstrikes in Afghanistan; 2025 Pakistan–Afghanistan conflict; 2026 Afghanistan–Pakistan war Afghan Conflict; Soviet–Afghan War; Operation Cyclone; Second Battle of Zhawar; First Afghan Civil War (1989–1992); Second Afghan Civil War (1992–1996); Third Afghan Civil War (1996–2001); NATO logistics operations War in Afghanistan; Republican insurgency in Afghanistan War in North-West Pakistan; Battle of Wana; Operation al-Mizan; Battle of Mir Ali; Operation Rah-e-Haq; Operation Zalzala; Operation Sirat-e-Mustaqeem; Operation Sherdil; Operation Black Thunderstorm; Operation Rah-e-Rast; Operation Rah-e-Nijat; 2009 Khyber Pass offensive; Operation Janbaz; Mohmand offensive; Orakzai and Kurram offensive; Operation Koh-e-Sufaid; Operation Rah-e-Shahadat; Operation Khyber; January 2014 FATA airstrikes; May 2014 Waziristan airstrikes; Operation Zarb-e-Azb; Operation Radd-ul-Fasaad; Operation Azm-e-Istehkam; Operation Sarbakaf U.S. led War on Terror; War in Afghanistan (2001–2021); NATO logistics in the Afghan War; 2020-2021 US troop withdrawal from Afghanistan; 2011-2016 US troop withdrawal from Afghanistan Iran–Pakistan border skirmishes; 2024 Iran–Pakistan conflict; Operation Marg Bar Sarmachar Sri Lankan Civil War; Military assistance to Sri Lanka United Nations Missions; UN Protection Force; Yugoslav Wars; Bosnian War; Unified Task Force; Somali Civil War; 2004 Indian Ocean relief operations; UNSM – Haiti; Operation Madadt (supplementary role) Internal Conflicts; Insurgency in Balochistan; Second Balochistan conflict; Third Balochistan conflict; Fourth Balochistan conflict; Fifth Balochistan conflict; Sectarian conflicts in Pakistan; Dir campaign; 1976 Dir rebellion Miscellaneous Conflicts; Nagorno−Karabakh conflict (alleged)
- Battle honours: Major Engagements
- Website: paf.gov.pk

Commanders
- Commander-in-Chief: President Asif Ali Zardari
- Chief of Defence Forces: F.M Asim Munir
- Chief of the Air Staff: Air Chief Marshal Zaheer Ahmad Babar
- Spokesman: Air Vice Marshal Tariq Ghazi

Insignia
- Roundel

- Fin flash

- Flag

Aircraft flown
- Attack: Mirage 5, Mirage III, Burraq UCAV, CH-4 UCAV, Wing Loong II UCAV, Akıncı UCAV, TB2 UCAV
- Electronic warfare: SAAB-2000 Erieye (AWACS), ZDK-03 (AWACS), Falcon DA-20 (EW)
- Fighter: F-16A/B/AM/BM/C/D, JF-17A/B/C, Chengdu J-10C
- Helicopter: AW139, Mi-171
- Interceptor: F-7PG
- Reconnaissance: Mirage IIIRP, Jasoos I UAV, Jasoos II Bravo+ UAV, Shahpar UAV, Selex ES Falco
- Trainer: MFI-17 Mushshak, MFI-395 Super Mushshak, T-37, K-8P, F-16B/D, JF-17B
- Transport: C-130B/E/L-100, Gulfstream IV, Phenom 100, Saab 2000, Harbin Y-12
- Tanker: Ilyushin Il-78

The Pakistan Air Force (PAF) (Urdu: پاک فِضائیہ, romanised: Pāk Fizāʾiyah; pronounced [pɑːk fɪzɑːɪjəɦ]) (Note: Pāk is a term commonly used in South Asia (as well as outside of it) to refer to the country of Pakistan or anything related to it. In terms of pronouncing the words for the Pakistan Air Force in Urdu, the full form—Pākistān—would be used, with the respective spelling in Urdu being: ''پاکستان ہوائی فوج'') is the aerial warfare branch of the Pakistan Armed Forces, tasked primarily with the aerial defence of Pakistan, with a secondary role of providing air support to the Pakistan Army and Pakistan Navy when required, and a tertiary role of providing strategic airlift capability to Pakistan.

As of 2024, per the International Institute for Strategic Studies, the PAF has more than 70,000 active-duty personnel. Its primary mandate and mission is "to provide, in synergy with other inter-services, the most efficient, assured and cost effective aerial defence of Pakistan." Since its establishment in 1947, the PAF has been involved in various combat operations, providing aerial support to the operations and relief efforts of the Pakistani military. Under Article 243 of the Constitution, the president of Pakistan is the civilian commander-in-chief of the Pakistan Armed Forces. The Chief of the Air Staff (CAS), by statute a four-star air officer, is appointed by the president with the consultation and confirmation needed from the prime minister of Pakistan.

== History ==
=== 1947–1950: Formative years ===
The Royal Pakistan Air Force (RPAF) was established on 15 August 1947 with the independence of Pakistan from British India. The RPAF began with a paper share allotment of 2,332 personnel, a fleet of 24 Tempest II fighter-bombers, 16 Hawker Typhoon fighters, two H.P.57 Halifax bombers, two Auster aircraft, twelve North American Harvard trainers and ten de Havilland Tiger Moth biplanes. Very few were available to the RPAF on the ground as they were scattered throughout the British India to be given and collected later on. Of these very few were in flyable condition so that they could be used. Subsequently, it also got eight C-47 Dakota cargo planes which it used to transport supplies to soldiers fighting in the 1947 War in Kashmir against India. First two H.P.57 Halifax bombers were delivered in 1948 and were used during 1947 War for night-time supply drop missions at Skardu and other northern areas of Pakistan. All received against allotted at the time of independence of Pakistan from British India. It started with seven airbases scattered all over the provinces.

=== 1948–1954: Waziristan rebellion ===
After the partition of British India, Faqir of Ipi, a Pashtun separatist leader rejected the creation of the newly created Pakistan.

In 1948, the Faqir of Ipi took control of North Waziristan's Datta Khel area and declared the establishment of an independent Pashtunistan, with support from neighbouring Kingdom of Afghanistan.

In response to the Faqir's rebellion, Pakistan Air Force in June 1949 inadvertently bombed the Afghan village of Mughalgai on the Waziristan border with Afghanistan while chasing the Pashtunistan separatists who had attacked Pakistani border posts from Afghanistan, this attack came to known as Mughalgai raid which left 23 separatists dead and further fuelled Afghan support for Pashtunistan. Faqir established Gurwek as headquarters for his activities. Faqir also established a rifle factory in Gurwek with the material support provided by the government of Afghanistan.

In 1953–1954, the PAF's No. 14 Squadron led an operation from Miranshah airbase and heavily bombarded the Faqir of Ipi's compound in Gurwek which ultimately forced Faqir to detach from an armed campaign against Pakistan.

=== 1959 Indian aerial intrusion ===
On 10 April 1959, on the occasion of the Eid ul-Fitr festival holiday in Pakistan, an Indian Air Force (IAF) English Electric Canberra B(I)58 of No. 106 Squadron entered Pakistani airspace on a photo reconnaissance mission. Two PAF F-86F Sabres (Flt. Lt. M. N. Butt (leader) and Flt. Lt. M. Yunis) of No. 15 Squadron on Air Defence Alert (ADA) were scrambled from PAF Base Peshawar to intercept the IAF aircraft. Butt attempted to bring down the Canberra by firing his Sabre's machine guns, but the Canberra was flying at an altitude of more than 50,000 feet—beyond the operational ceiling of the F-86F. When Yunis took over from his leader, the Canberra suddenly lost height while executing a turn over Rawalpindi. Yunis fired a burst that struck the Canberra at an altitude of 47,500 feet and brought it down over Rawat, marking the first direct aerial victory of the PAF. Both crew members of the IAF Canberra ejected and were captured by Pakistani authorities. They were subsequently released after remaining in detention for some time.

=== 1960–1961 Bajaur Campaign ===
Between 1960 and 1961, Royal Afghan Army troops along with thousands of Pashtun tribesmen from Afghanistan crossed the extremely porous Pakistan–Afghanistan border and entered the semi-autonomous Bajaur Agency of Pakistan in an effort to annex the region.

The Pakistan Air Force sent F-86 Sabre jets in order to support the Pakistani forces and local Pashtun tribesmen of Pakistan who were fighting the Afghan infiltrators. The F-86 Sabre jets also executed bombing runs on Royal Afghan Army positions in Kunar, Afghanistan, thus leading Afghan forces to fall back to the international border. Although the Royal Afghan Air Force had seven MiG-17 squadrons and another MiG-21 squadron being operationalised, no known dogfight has been recorded between the two sides.

=== Indo-Pakistani War of 1965 ===
The PAF fleet at the time consisted of 12 F-104 Starfighters, some 120 F-86 Sabres and around 20 B-57 Canberra bombers. The PAF claims to have had complete air superiority over the battle area from the second day of operations. However, IAF Air Chief Marshal Arjan Singh claimed that, despite having been qualitatively inferior to the PAF, the IAF allegedly achieved total air superiority in three days.

Many publications have credited the PAF's successes in combat with the IAF to its U.S.-quality equipment, claiming it to be superior to the aircraft operated by the IAF and giving the PAF a "qualitative advantage". This statement has been refuted by some officials in Pakistan, who say that the IAF's MiG-21, Hawker Hunter and Folland Gnat aircraft had better performance than the PAF's F-86 fighters, without accounting for the obvious quantitative advantage that the IAF possessed. According to retired PAF Air Commodore Sajad Haider, the F-86 Sabre was inferior in terms of both power and speed to the IAF's Hawker Hunter.

Air Commodore Sajad Haider, who flew with No. 19 squadron also stated that the F-104 Starfighter did not deserve its reputation as "the pride of the PAF" because it "was unsuited to the tactical environment of the region. It was a high-level interceptor designed to neutralise Soviet strategic bombers in altitudes above 40,000 feet." Nevertheless, the IAF is believed to have feared facing the Starfighter in combat despite its lack of effectiveness in comparison to the IAF's fleet of Folland Gnats. According to Indian sources, the F-86F performed reasonably well against the IAF's Hunters but not as well against the Gnat, which was nicknamed the Sabre Slayer by the IAF.

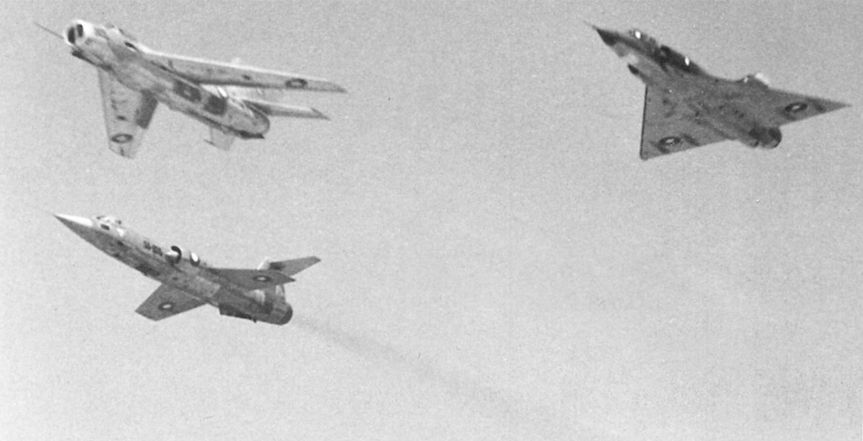
Pakistan Air Force's Cold War Fleet of the 1960s heavily used during the September War of 1965. Above is a PAF's 3-ship formation consisting of a Shenyang F-6, Lockheed F-104 & Dassault Mirage-III.

Per India, most of the aircraft losses of the IAF were allegedly on the ground while the PAF suffered most of their losses in aerial combat, a claim that has widely been accepted by most international sources as "a stretch". The IAF ran a larger offensive air campaign by devoting 40% of its air effort to offensive air support alone.

The two countries have made contradictory claims of combat losses during the war and few neutral sources have verified the claims of either country, as is the case with most India-Pakistan conflicts. The PAF claims that it shot down 104 IAF aircraft and lost 19 of its own, while the IAF claimed it shot down 73 PAF aircraft while losing 60 of its own. According to most independent and neutral sources, the PAF lost some 20 aircraft while the IAF lost somewhere between 60 and 75.

Despite the intense fighting throughout the course of the war, the conflict was effectively a stalemate and inconclusive in its result.

=== Indo-Pakistani War of 1971 ===
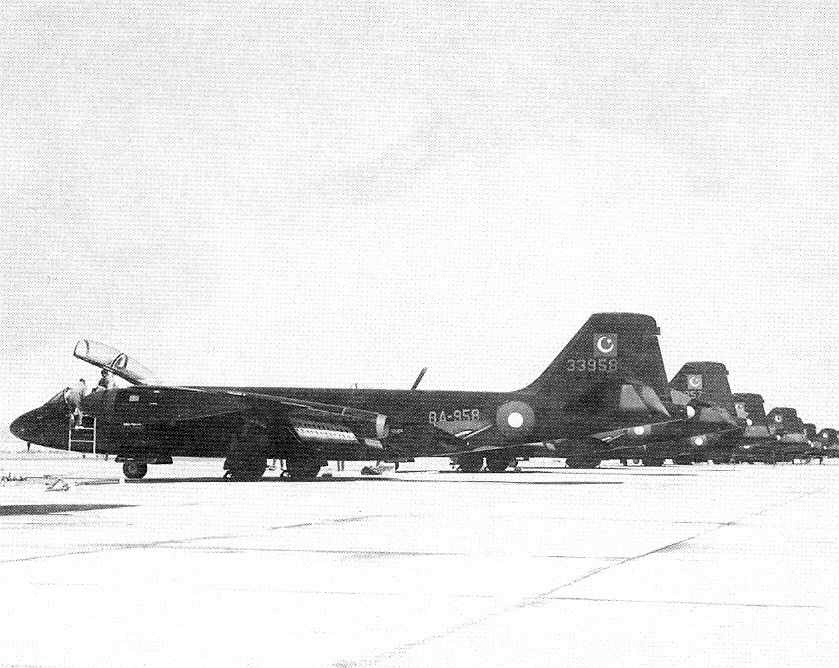
PAF B-57 Canberra bombers lined up at an airbase

By late 1971, the intensification of the independence movement in erstwhile East Pakistan led to the Bangladesh Liberation War (later joined by India). On 22 November 1971, 10 days before the start of a full-scale war, four PAF F-86 Sabre jets attacked Indian and Mukti Bahini positions at Garibpur, near the international border. Two of the four PAF Sabres were shot down and one damaged by the IAF's Gnats. On 3 December, India formally declared war against Pakistan following massive preemptive strikes by the PAF against IAF installations in Srinagar, Ambala, Sirsa, Halwara and Jodhpur. However, the IAF did not suffer any significant losses because the leadership had anticipated such a move and consequently, precautions were taken. The IAF was quick to respond to Pakistani airstrikes, following which the PAF carried out mostly defensive sorties.

Hostilities officially ended at 14:30 GMT on 17 December, after the fall of Dacca on 15 December. The PAF flew about 2,840 sorties and destroyed 71 IAF aircraft while losing 43 of its own. But most independent and neutral sources claim that PAF lost 75 aircraft while the IAF lost 45–60 aircraft.

=== 1979–1989: Soviet–Afghan War ===
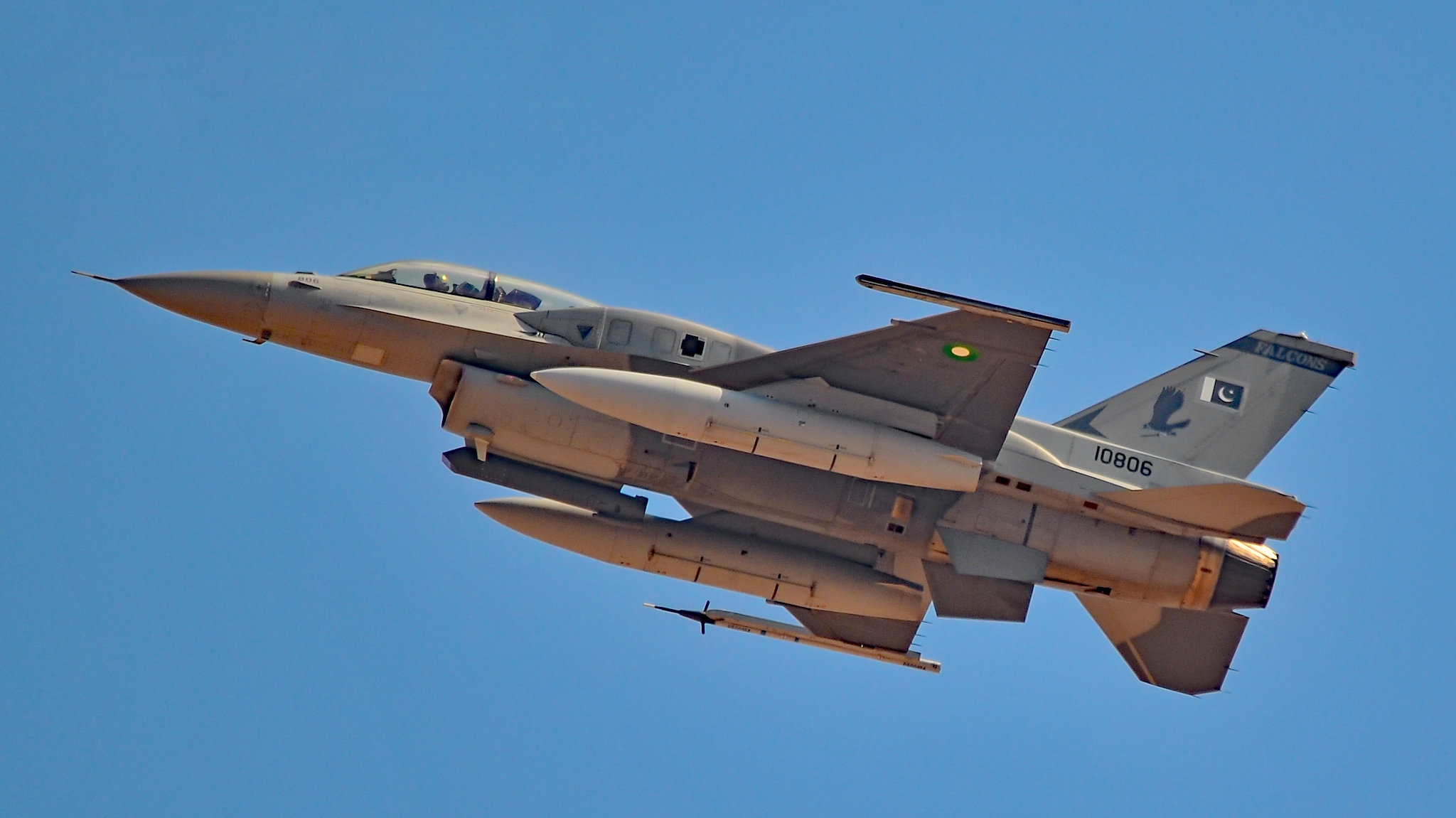
A Pakistan Air Force F-16D Falcon

In 1979, the PAF's Chief of the Air Staff, Air Chief Marshal Anwar Shamim, was told by then-President and Chief of the Army Staff General Zia-ul-Haq, that Pakistan had reliable intelligence on Indian plans to attack and destroy Pakistan's nuclear research facilities in Kahuta. ACM Shamim told General Zia-ul-Haq that, in the PAF's current state, "Indian aircraft could reach the area in three minutes whereas the PAF would take eight minutes, allowing the Indians to attack the facility and return before the PAF could defend or retaliate". Because Kahuta was close to the Indian border, a consensus was reached acknowledging that the best way to deter a possible Indian attack would be to procure new advanced fighters and weaponry. These could be used to mount a retaliatory attack on India's nuclear research facilities in Trombay in the event of an Indian attack on Kahuta. It was decided the most suitable aircraft would be the F-16 Fighting Falcon, which the United States eventually agreed to supply after the PAF refused to purchase the F-5. In 1983, when the first batch of F-16s reached Pakistan, ACM Shamim informed Zia of the PAF's increasing capability to effectively respond to an attack on the nuclear research facilities at Kahuta.

Due to rising tensions with the Soviet Union due to its invasion of Afghanistan, Pakistan's ISI systematically coordinated with the CIA, MI6 and Mossad to secure American resources and armaments for the Afghan mujahideen who were combating the invading Soviet forces. Various reports during this period widely indicated that the PAF had in fact covertly engaged in aerial combat against the Soviet Air Force in support of the Afghan Air Force during the course of the conflict; one of which belonged to Alexander Rutskoy.

A letter of agreement for up to 28 F-16A and 12 F-16B was signed in December 1981. The contracts, Peace Gate I and Peace Gate II were for 6 and 34 Block 15 models respectively, which would be powered by the F100-PW-200 engine. The first Peace Gate I aircraft was accepted at Fort Worth in October 1982. Two F-16A and four F-16B were subsequently delivered to Pakistan in 1983, with the first F-16 arriving at PAF Base Sargodha (now known as PAF Base Mushaf) on 15 January 1983 flown by Squadron Leader Shahid Javed. The 34 remaining aircraft as part of Peace Gate II were delivered between 1983 and 1987.

Between May 1986 and November 1988, the PAF's newly acquired F-16s had shot down at least eight intruding aircraft from Afghanistan. The first three of these (one Su-22, one probable Su-22, and one An-26) were shot down by two pilots from No. 9 Squadron. Pilots of No. 14 Squadron destroyed the remaining five intruders (two Su-22s, two MiG-23s, and one Su-25). Most of these kills were by the AIM-9 Sidewinder, but at least one (a Su-22) was destroyed by cannon fire. Pakistani Flight Lieutenant Khalid Mahmoud is credited with three of these kills.

The PAF is believed to have evaluated the French Dassault Mirage 2000 in early 1981 and was planning to evaluate the F-16 Fighting Falcon afterwards.

=== 1990–2001: U.S. arms embargo ===
After the Pressler amendment was passed, the United States placed sanctions and an arms embargo on Pakistan starting on 6 October 1990 due to the continuance of the country's nuclear weapons research programme. All eleven Peace Gate III F-16s, along with seven F-16A and ten F-16B of the 60 Peace Gate IV F-16s, which had been built by the end of 1994 were embargoed and put into storage on U.S. soil.

Desperate for a new high-tech combat aircraft, between late 1990 and 1993 the PAF evaluated the European Panavia Tornado MRCA (multi-role combat aircraft), and ultimately rejected it. France's Dassault Mirage 2000E and an offer from Poland for the supply of MiG-29s and Su-27s were also considered, but no deal materialised. In 1992, the PAF once again looked towards the French Mirage 2000, reviving a proposal from the early 1980s to procure around 20–40 aircraft, but a sale did not occur because France did not want to sell a fully capable version due to pressure from the United States. In August 1994, the PAF was offered the Saab JAS-39 Gripen by Sweden, but the sale did not occur because 20% of the Gripen's components were sourced from the U.S., which was still maintaining sanctions on Pakistan.

In mid-1992, Pakistan was close to signing a contract for the supply of 40 Dassault Mirage 2000s, equipped with Thomson-CSF RDM/7 radars from France, although U.S. sanctions also prevented this deal from finalising.

In mid-1994, it was reported that Russian manufacturers Sukhoi and Mikoyan were offering the Su-27 and MiG-29, but Pakistan was reported to be negotiating for supply of the Mirage 2000–5. French and Russian teams visited Pakistan on 27 November 1994 and it was speculated that the interest in Russian aircraft was to pressure France into reducing the price of the Mirage 2000. The stated requirement was for up to 40 aircraft.

=== 2001–2021: War in Afghanistan ===
The Pakistan Air Force is believed to have had a primary role in the alleged evacuation of Taliban personnel by the Pakistani military from Afghanistan. However, Pakistani and American officials have denied any such airlift taking place.

=== 2008 post-Mumbai attacks air alert ===
After the 2008 Mumbai attacks, the Pakistan Air Force was put on high alert in anticipation of any potential Indian accusations and offensives. It deployed to all its wartime locations and started routine combat air patrols. The speed and intensity of the deployment and PAF's readiness took the Indian Army High Command by surprise and later reports suggest that was the main factor to influence the Indians' decision of not going for cross border raids inside Pakistan. The PAF was issued a standing order to launch an immediate counter-attack in case of an air attack from India, after a call from the Indian Foreign Minister Pranab Mukherjee to the Pakistani President Asif Ali Zardari (the call later turned out to be a hoax).

=== 2011 U.S. raid in Abbottabad ===
An initial investigation report revealed that the Pakistan Air Force (PAF) reported the movement of some half-a-dozen planes near the Jalalabad border at 23:00 before American helicopters entered Abbottabad to kill Osama bin Laden. "One aircraft was identified as a US AWACS and the remaining five were recognized as F/A-18 jets of the US. These planes flew near the Pakistani border, but did not cross into the airspace of Pakistan,"

On the detection of an intrusion, PAF jets on air defence alert were scrambled and the PAF immediately took adequate operational measures as per standard operating procedure. The PAF aircraft continued their presence in the Abbottabad area until early morning and later returned to their air bases.

However, the operation was conducted with stealthy modified versions of the Black Hawk helicopter which used special technology to avoid detection to entered Pakistani airspace, stayed for three hours to carry out a major operation. PAF jets only arrived at the location 24 minutes after the American helicopters had left. It was one of the most asymmetric capability incidents in PAF history.

=== 2001–2021: Counter-insurgency operations in North-West Pakistan ===
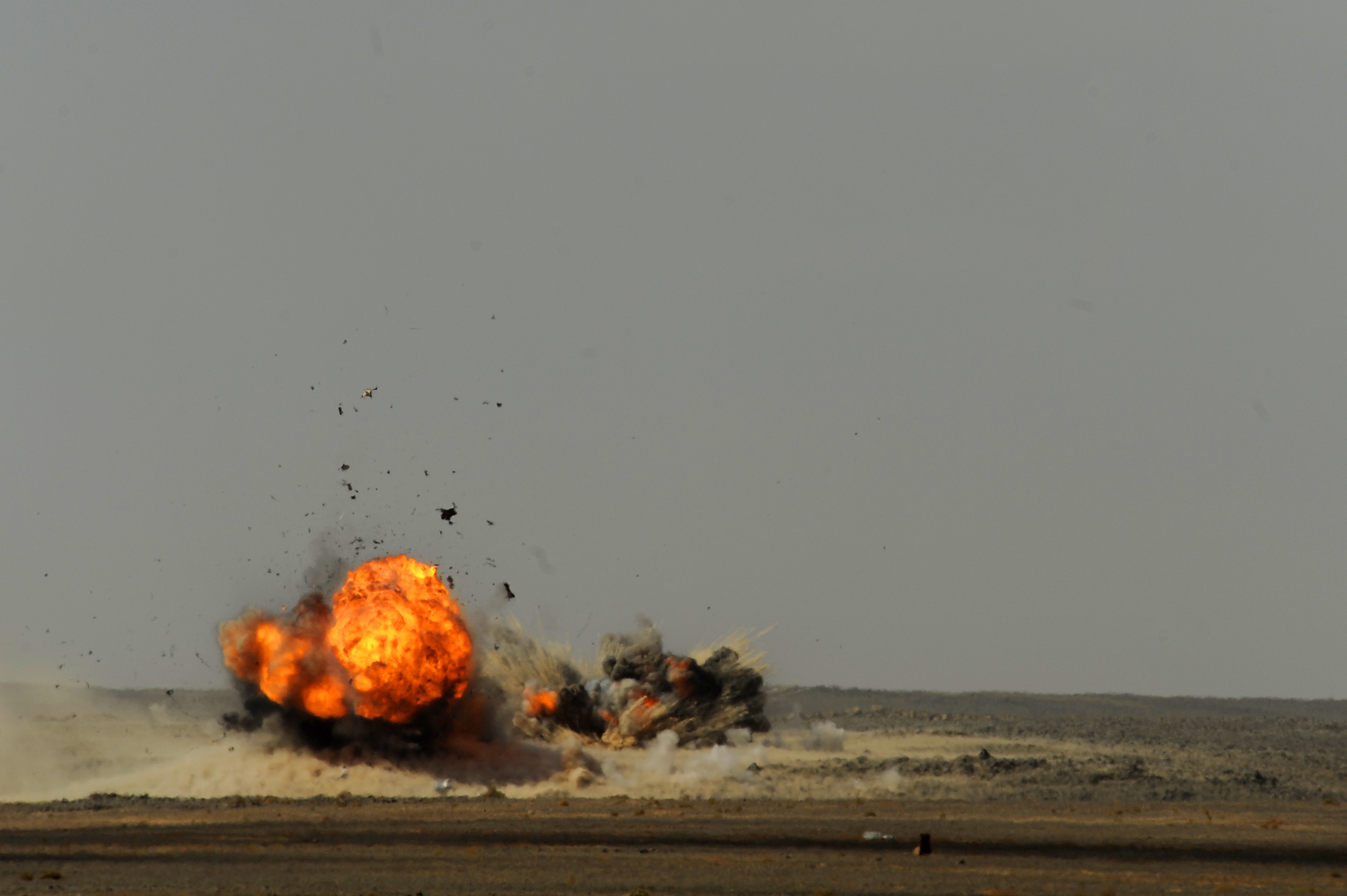
Pakistan Air Force Mirage III aircraft drops two 500-pound bombs during Falcon Air Meet 2010 at Azraq Royal Jordanian Air Base in Azraq, Jordan

The Pakistan Army faced several problems during its 2009 offensive against the Taliban in North-West Pakistan. Hundreds of thousands of Pakistanis vacated the area when the offensive was announced and, eventually, over two million had to be accommodated in refugee camps. The offensive was to be completed as quickly as possible to allow the refugees to return to their homes but the army's fleet attack helicopters were insufficient to provide adequate support to infantry on the ground. The PAF was sent into action against the Taliban to make up for the lack of helicopter gunships. Because the PAF was trained and equipped to fight a conventional war, a new "counter-terrorist doctrine" had to be improvised.

The PAF's Saffron Bandit exercise focused on extensive training of combat personnel to undertake COIN operations. New equipment was inducted to improve the PAF's joint intelligence, surveillance and reconnaissance (ISR) capabilities. A C-130 transport aircraft was indigenously modified for day/night ISR operations.

Use of laser-guided bombs was increased to 80% of munitions used, as compared to 40% in the previous 1960s Bajaur campaign. A small corps of ground spotters were trained and used by the PAF, in addition to Pakistan Army spotters, to identify high-value targets.

Prior to the Pakistan Army's offensive into South Waziristan, the PAF attacked militant infrastructure with 500 lb and 2000 lb bombs.

A number of civilian casualties occurred during PAF airstrikes on 10 April 2010 in the FATA tribal region. According to sources from the Pakistani military, the first bombing was targeted at a gathering of militants in a compound. Locals who had quickly moved onto the scene of the first airstrike to recover the dead and wounded were then killed by a second airstrike. While there is no confirmed death toll, it is widely believed that at least 30 civilian deaths had occurred according to the military approximations, whereas a local official stated that at least 73 locals, including women and children, were killed. A six-member committee of tribal elders from the area tasked with finding the exact number of civilian casualties reported that 61 civilians were killed and 21 were wounded. This was not confirmed by government figures but Pakistan's then-Chief of the Army Staff, General Ashfaq Kayani, gave a public apology on 17 April. It is reported that BBC News and several other media correspondences were not allowed to take interviews from the injured.

=== 2019 Pakistan airstrikes in Jammu and Kashmir ===
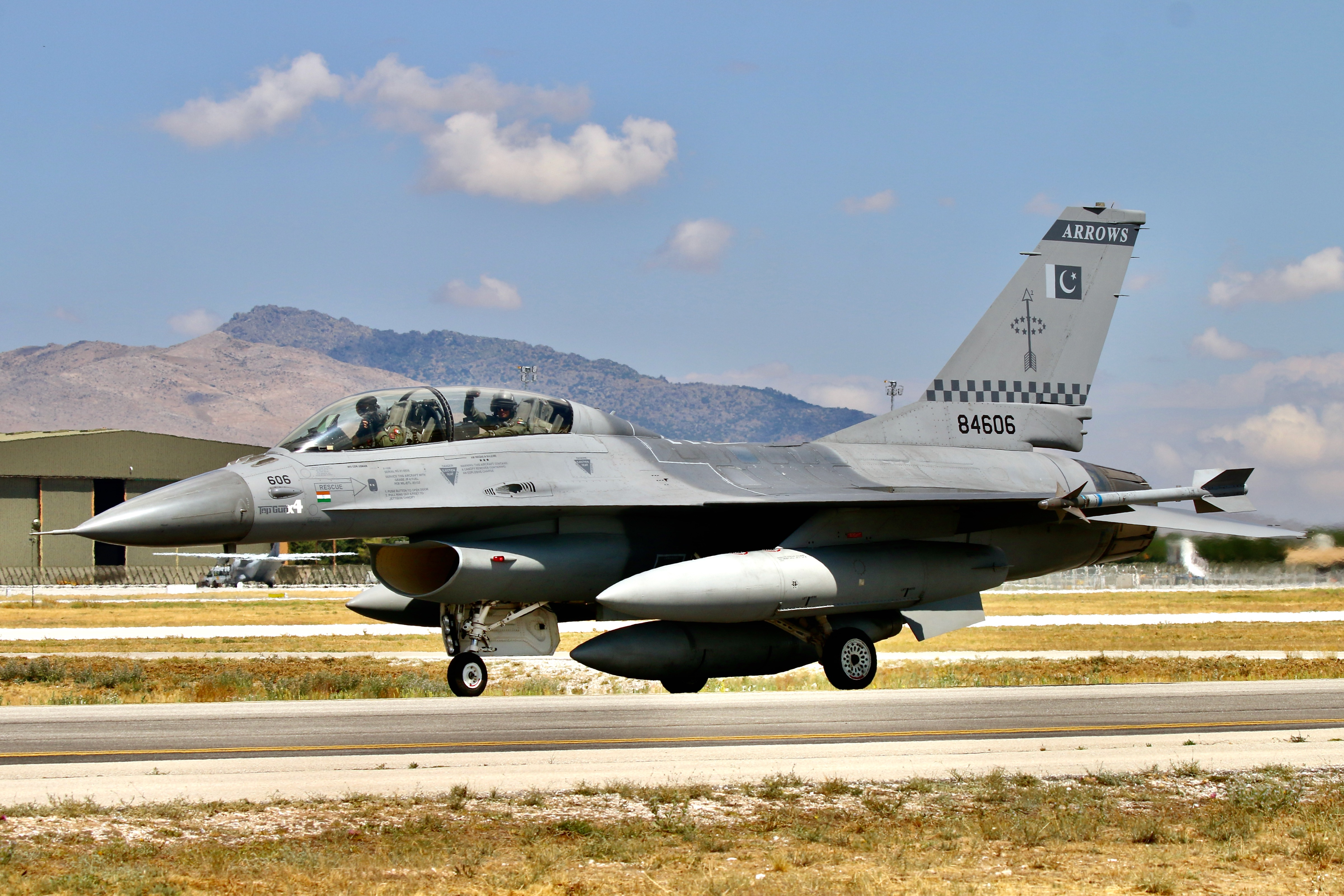
The F-16BM (S. No. 84606) from the No. 11 Squadron "Arrows" which shot down one of the Indian jets in 2019

Following the Pulwama attack in Jammu and Kashmir, India accused Pakistan of involvement in this incident. In response, India carried out airstrikes in the vicinity of the town of Balakot in Khyber Pakhtunkhwa province, several miles inside the province's boundary with Pakistan-administered Kashmir. Pakistan's military claimed that the Indian planes dropped their payload in an uninhabited wooded hilltop area near Balakot after being intercepted by PAF fighter jets.

On 27 February 2019, when a standoff between India and Pakistan had begun, Pakistan claimed to have struck six open spaces near Indian military installations inside Indian Controlled Kashmir, in what was codenamed "Operation Swift Retort".

Indian Air Force jets were scrambled to intercept the PAF jets inside Jammu and Kashmir. Following the interception, a fierce dogfight ensued and Pakistani aircraft shot down an Indian MiG-21.

Ten minutes before the 27 February airstrikes, an IAF Mi-17 helicopter was shot down by an Indian Spyder missile, having been mistaken for a PAF drone. This resulted in total loss of the aircraft and death of all on board: two pilots (squadron leaders Siddarth Vashista and Ninad Mandavgane), flight engineer Vishal Kumar Pandey, sergeant Vikrant Sehrawat, and corporals Deepak Pandey and Pankaj Kumars, and one civilian on the ground (Kifayat Hussain Gani). In April 2023 IAF court martialled Group Captain Sumon Roy Chaudhry, second in command of Srinagar Air Force Station at the time of the PAF strikes for negligence, and he was to be dismissed, however the dismissal was ruled ultra vires by the High Court of Punjab and Haryana, who set a date of 12 September 2023 for their hearing The pilots were posthumously awarded the Vayu Sena gallantry medal.

India stated that it had only lost a single aircraft (a MiG-21) while claiming to have shot down a Pakistani F-16. Pakistan rejected India's statement, stating that no F-16s were deployed. India also accepted loss of its Mi-17 helicopter in a friendly fire terming it as "a big mistake". Pakistan would later go on to accept that F-16s had been used, but maintained that none of them were shot down. Pakistan also claimed to have shot down a Sukhoi Su-30 MKI, a claim rejected by Indian authorities. Wing Commander Abhinandan Varthaman, who was piloting the MiG-21 Bison, was captured and arrested by the Pakistani military upon being shot down. He was held for two days, before being released at the Wagah-Attari border crossing on 1 March in what the Pakistani Prime Minister Imran Khan called a gesture of peace. Khan received praise from both sides of the border for his restraint and steps towards peace.

Initially, Pakistani military officials claimed to have had two pilots in custody, one of whom died while undergoing treatment, a claim which was later changed to having only Abhinandan in custody. This was taken to be evidence of a Pakistani pilot being shot down by some Indian sources. A US count of the PAFs F-16 fleet and several international military observers, did not support the Indian claim of shooting down a PAF F-16.

=== 2022 Pakistani airstrikes in Afghanistan ===
At least 47 people were killed and 22 injured in two airstrikes by Pakistani forces along the border with Afghanistan on 16 April 2022. The Taliban summoned Pakistan's ambassador in Kabul and registered their protest against the military airstrikes inside Afghanistan. These airstrikes mark the first known instance of a foreign country launching attack on Afghan soil since the establishment of Islamic Emirate in Afghanistan.

=== 2024 Pakistani airstrikes in Iran ===
At least 9 people were killed when Pakistan Air Force conducted retaliatory strikes, codenamed as Operation Marg Bar Sarmachar on seven targets within Iran's Sistan and Baluchestan province. The attack came two days after a similar Iranian missile strike inside Pakistani territory in which 2 people being killed. According to Iran, nine foreign nationals were killed in the attack. Baloch Liberation Army, one of the group targeted in the strikes, said that the strikes had targeted and killed its people. It was first strike on Iranian soil by any foreign power since the time of end of Iran–Iraq War in 1988.

=== March 2024 Pakistani airstrikes in Afghanistan ===
On 18 March 2024, in response to the attack from Afghanistan, Pakistan Air Force carried out two intelligence based airstrikes on Afghanistan's eastern border provinces of Khost and Paktika. The Afghan government claim that Pakistan killed five women and three children. Pakistan denies this, claiming that it killed terrorists instead while targeting the Hafiz Gul Bahadur militant group, a splinter organisation of the Pakistani Taliban, and that it had successfully killed Sehra alias Janan, a high-value target (HVT) commander. Another commander, Abdullah Mehsud, was claimed to have been killed, but later released a video refuting the claim. It was also reported that Mehsud's house was targeted in which his wife and a minor son was killed. Pakistan went on to blame the Pakistani Taliban and its splinter militias for the deaths of hundreds of Pakistani civilians, and claimed that they used Afghanistan as a base and that they had support from within the Taliban. These airstrikes mark the second instance of attack by Pakistan on the sovereign soil of Afghanistan in a period less than two years. The first similar Pakistani airstrikes on Afghan soil came in 2022.

=== December 2024 Pakistani airstrikes in Afghanistan ===
On 25 December 2024, the Pakistan Air Force launched precision airstrikes located across seven villages of Barmal District of Afghanistan Paktika province killing 20-25 terrorists. Afghan Taliban claim that Pakistani strikes had killed 46 people, including women and children, while Pakistan denies this claim and maintains terrorist camps operated by Tehreek-i-Taliban Pakistan(TTP) were gutted. The villages targeted by PAF included Laman, Margha, and Murg Bazaar and four other villages of Barmal district. Reports indicate that the Murg Bazaar village in Barmal was completely destroyed. According to Pakistani sources, the Pakistani airstrikes took four High Value Targets (HVTs) that included terrorists camps and hideouts of key commanders of TTP. The targets included the compound of senior ranking Commander of TTP Sher Zaman alias Mukhlis Yar's hideout, the Commander Abu Hamza's recruitment camp and Akhtar Muhammad alias Khalil's suicide bomber camp. All of these commanders were using camps for recruitment and training young child suicide bombers and terrorists. The fourth target struck by PAF was "Umar Media" cell of TTP, being headed by the TTP's commander Shoaib Iqbal Cheema alias Muneeb Jatt, from where the TTP propagated its digital propaganda to recruit suicide bombers. Afghan Taliban's Defence Ministry and the Afghan Taliban regime official spokesperson Zabiullah Mujahid confirmed reports of the strike carried out by Pakistani forces, but claimed that the dead and injured included a number of children and other civilians. The PAF's strikes mark third instance of Pakistan launching attack on Afghan soil since the fall of Kabul. The Pakistan airstrikes coincided the birthday of Pakistan's founder and followed the PAF's 2022 Pakistani airstrikes in Afghanistan and 2024 Pakistani airstrikes in Afghanistan.

=== May 2025 India–Pakistan conflict ===
During the 2025 India–Pakistan conflict, the Pakistan Air Force was involved in a major beyond-visual-range aerial engagement following Indian strikes under Operation Sindoor–in this aerial battle more than 114 aircraft were involved 72 from IAF and 42 from PAF. Reuters reported that U.S. officials said Pakistani Chengdu J-10 fighters shot down at least two Indian military aircraft, including at least one Dassault Rafale. Reuters later reported that the downing of the Rafale was linked to Indian intelligence underestimating the range of the Chinese-made PL-15 missile used by Pakistani J-10 fighters. The Washington Post verified visual evidence consistent with the crash of at least two French-made Indian Air Force aircraft, a Rafale and a Dassault Mirage 2000. According to The Washington Quarterly Indian air force lost at least 4 aircraft.

India's Chief of Defence Staff Anil Chauhan acknowledged Indian aerial losses but declined to specify the number. Meanwhile, Pakistan officially claimed 5 Indian jets, including 3 Rafale, 1 Mig-29, 1 SU-30MKI and 1 unmanned areial drone.

Despite these early successes, by the morning of 10 May, the Pakistani Air Force and its air defence network had been overwhelmed by the Indian Air Force. The Indian Air Force was able to achieve air superiority over a large part of Pakistani airspace. All major Pakistani airbases were struck. Pakistan risked losing its eastern airbases if hostilities continued. Pakistani airbases absorbed real but limited damage that the PAF repaired, with no aircraft losses, and all airbases remained operational. Although India claimed they destroyed multiple Pakistani aircraft in these attacks, Pakistan acknowledged only minor damage to a single aircraft.

Pakistan subsequently launched surface-to-surface missiles against Indian airbases and military positions. However, this effort proved unsuccessful. Indian air defence systems were able to intercept most of the incoming missiles. No significant damage was reported at Indian military installations or airbases,although Indian officials acknowledged limited damage at four Airbases.

Udhampur air base in India damaged by Pakistani forces.

Pakistan then convened a meeting of its National Command Authority, the body responsible for decision-making regarding the country's nuclear arsenal. This development alarmed United States officials, who feared further escalation of the conflict. The United States subsequently pressured both India and Pakistan to agree to a ceasefire.

=== 2025 Afghanistan–Pakistan conflict ===
==== 9 October 2025 ====
In the early hours of 9 October 2025, Pakistan carried out airstrikes in Kabul, Khost, Jalalabad, and Paktika, targeting the Pakistani Taliban (TTP) which it code named "Operation Khyber Storm". The group's leader, Noor Wali Mehsud, was the main target of the attack in Kabul, which occurred in Abdul Haq Square, but survived. On 9 October 2025, at around 9:50 p.m. AFT, 2 loud explosions were heard in Kabul, particularly in the eastern sectors near Abdul Haq Square, District 8 of Kabul. Explosions and gunfire were heard in other parts of Kabul, leading residents to believe that an airstrike had taken place. Witnesses described hearing the sound of aircraft overhead shortly after the blasts. Subsequent reports said that the leader of the Tehreek-e-Taliban Pakistan/Pakistani Taliban (TTP), Noor Wali Mehsud was the target of the strike. Airstrikes were also reported to have taken place in Khost, Jalalabad, and Paktika. However, the Afghan government only confirmed airstrikes in Kabul and Paktika. A TTP official confirmed that the airstrike in Kabul killed at least two senior members of the group. Some sources claimed that TTP Emir Noor Wali Mehsud was killed in the strike; however, the TTP released an unverified voice recording purportedly from Mehsud, in which he states that he is alive. Mehsud later released a video showing that he was alive and escaped the strikes on him by the Pakistan Air Force (PAF).

Afghan journalists noted that the Afghan Taliban restricted access to the areas that had been struck by Pakistan.

The October 9 airstrikes was the unprecedented and first known airstrikes of Pakistan Air Force on Afghanistan's capital Kabul in the history of Afghanistan-Pakistan relations.

==== 12 October 2025 ====
On 12 October, local sources in Afghanistan reported that a drone strike by Pakistan in Afghanistan's southern provinces of Kandahar and Helmand killed 19 Taliban fighters, including Commander Haji Nusrat. The casualties from the drone strike were not confirmed by Afghan officials.

Pakistani state media claimed that Pakistani forces had captured 21 Afghan border posts, with the Taliban fighters at the posts being either killed or escaping and some allegedly surrendering in Kurram District. The Inter-Services Public Relations, the media wing for the Pakistan Armed Forces, released aerial footage of its strike on cross-border Afghan positions. BBC Verify confirmed significant damage to an Afghan security compound in Spin Boldak following a Pakistani airstrike.

==== 15 October 2025 ====
On 15 October 2025, Pakistani officials announced that they had carried out a series of precision airstrikes inside Afghanistan targeting several military installations. According to the officials, the strikes struck key hideouts of the Taliban and TTP, killing dozens of foreign and Afghan operatives. The airstrike in Kabul specifically targeted the headquarters and leadership of anti-Pakistan militants, according to Pakistani officials. According to Afghan media sources, Pakistan's airstrikes in Kandahar struck the Fourth and Eighth Taliban Brigades as well as the Fifth Border Corps, reportedly killing between 15 and 20 Taliban fighters.

Pakistan released video footage of its air attacks on Afghan military positions during the conflict, including the Durrani Camp, Manojba Camp Battalion Headquarters, Manojba Camp-2, and the Ghaznali Headquarters adjacent to the Nushki district in Balochistan province. Radio Television Afghanistan (RTA) confirmed Pakistani drone strikes in Spin Boldak. BBC Verify also confirmed a video of a Pakistani munition striking an Afghan military vehicle in Spin Boldak. Abdul Ghafoor Abed, a journalist for RTA, was killed and another individual was injured during crossfire in Spin Boldak. In Kandahar, locals reported airstrikes on an Afghan military base and two additional strikes on targets in the Aino Mina settlement. Afghan security personnel sealed off access to Aino Mina, preventing anyone from entering the area. Afghan state media reported that a number of civilians were killed in the Pakistani airstrikes in Kandahar.

In Kabul, a resident reported hearing four large explosions, with blasts continuing intermittently every few minutes. Several residents reported hearing the sound of fighter jets flying overhead just moments before the explosions. Residents state that the Lulu Tower, a residential building, and another building were targeted in the airstrikes. According to locals, some Taliban officials may have been living in the tower's apartments. Afghan officials dismissed any new reports airstrikes in Afghanistan and attributed the explosions to an oil tanker blast.

The October 15 airstrikes was the second round of airstrikes by the Pakistan Air Force on Afghanistan's capital Kabul in the history of Afghanistan-Pakistan relations. At least five people were killed and 35 wounded in the blasts in Kabul, said Italian NGO, Emergency, which runs a hospital in the city. The casualties suffered shrapnel wounds, blunt force trauma, and burns, with 10 in critical condition, the NGO said.

According to according to local health officials, the death toll from clashes in Spin Boldak rose to 40 on the Afghan side. At least 171 others remained injured, with several of them in critical condition. According to Afghan media, it remains unclear whether any Taliban military personnel were among the dead. However, reports from southern Afghanistan suggest that the bodies of several Taliban fighters were transferred to Spin Boldak and nearby districts. The Afghan government did not release any casualty figures.

=== 17 October ===
The United Nations Assistance Mission in Afghanistan (UNAMA) disclosed that 37 civilians had died and 425 others had been injured due to cross-border violence in the past week. The provinces of Paktia, Paktika, Khost, Kunar, Kandahar, and Helmand saw the highest number of casualties.

On the same day, following the expiration of a 48-hour ceasefire, Pakistan carried out airstrikes in Paktika Province. According to Taliban officials, the airstrikes targeted three locations, with one strike hitting a house and killing 10 people. The victims included local cricket players, women, and children. The International Cricket Council (ICC) expressed sorrow over the deaths of three Afghan cricketers, condemned the violence, and stood in solidarity with the Afghanistan Cricket Board (ACB), which announced its withdrawal from the 2025 Pakistan T20I Tri-Nation Series that was to be played throughout November in respect for the victims. An Afghan spokesman confirmed the airstrikes, claiming they targeted civilians, and said Kabul reserved the right to respond, but had instructed fighters to hold back out of respect for the negotiating team. However, according to Pakistani officials, the airstrikes targeted hideouts of the militant belonging to the Hafiz Gul Bahadur Group, killing dozens of armed fighters.

=== 2026 Afghanistan–Pakistan conflict ===
==== 21 February 2026 ====
During the late hours of 21 February, local sources in Afghanistan reported airstrikes in parts of Nangarhar, Paktika, and Khost provinces. In Nangarhar, the strikes were reported in Bihsud and Khogyani districts, while in Paktika, they were reported in Barmal and Urgun districts. Local sources also reported strikes in parts of Khost province, although no further details were provided. Local sources report that the airstrikes in Nangarhar province's Bihsud district struck a civilian home, trapping 23 people beneath the rubble. Pakistan's Ministry of Information and Broadcasting stated that the military conducted "intelligence-based selective targeting" of seven terrorist camps and hideouts along the border region. Specific locations reported by Afghan sources included Girdi Kas village in Bihsud District, Nangarhar Province, and areas in Bermal and Urgun Districts of Paktika Province. The Taliban claimed that the targets included civilian homes and a religious seminary.

In a late-night press release, Pakistani officials confirmed that the Pakistan Air Force (PAF) had carried out airstrikes in Afghanistan. Officials said the strikes were selective and intelligence-based, and targeted seven militant camps and hideouts linked to the Pakistani Taliban and Islamic State Khorasan Province near the Pakistan–Afghanistan border. Additionally, Pakistani officials stated that the strikes were conducted as retaliation for the recent terror attacks in Islamabad, Bajaur, and Bannu. A Pakistani newspaper, citing military sources, reported that the seven TTP hideouts in Nangarhar, Paktika, and Khost provinces were destroyed and that more than 80 militants were killed; however, Taliban officials in Afghanistan stated that airstrikes took place in Nangarhar and Paktika provinces. They said an airstrike in Bihsud District killed 18 civilians, including 11 children. Afghan Taliban officials also condemned the airstrikes and warned of a calculated response at an appropriate time.

Shayesteh Jan Ahadi, former head of the Paktia Provincial Council, stated that Pakistani airstrikes in several districts were very widespread and powerful. The UN Assistance Mission in Afghanistan (UNAMA) reported that Pakistan carried out airstrikes between 11:45 p.m. on 21 February and 12:15 a.m. on 22 February. UNAMA also reported that airstrikes in Paktika province damaged or destroyed infrastructure. On 23 February, UNAMA confirmed that over thirteen civilians had been killed by the Pakistani airstrikes, with an additional seven injured.

Pakistan described the operation as a retributive response to a series of suicide bombings inside Pakistan, including the 6 February bombing of a Shia mosque in Islamabad that killed 31 worshippers (claimed by ISKP), and attacks in Bajaur and Bannu districts in Khyber Pakhtunkhwa during the early days of Ramadan. Pakistan also claimed that the strikes were "intelligence-based, selective operations" against seven camps and hideouts belonging to the Tehreek-e-Taliban Pakistan (TTP, also referred to by Pakistani authorities as Fitna al-Khawarij), its affiliates, and the Islamic State – Khorasan Province (ISKP).This was the seventh time Pakistan has carried out airstrike in Afghanistan since the Afghan Taliban took over in August 2021.

The Taliban-led Afghan government condemned the strikes as a "blatant violation of Afghanistan's territorial integrity" and a breach of international law, stating that they hit civilian homes, a religious seminary, and other civilian structures, killing at least 18 people (including women and children) and leaving others missing under rubble. In addition, one family in Girdi Kas lost 18 of 23 members, and additional casualties were reported in Paktika. Afghan officials vowed an "appropriate and measured response" at a suitable time.

==== 26 February 2026 ====
On 26 February 2026, Pakistan launched Operation Ghazab Lil Haq in response to Taliban-led Afghanistan's offensive against Pakistan what they described as a "retaliatory operation" along the border in the provinces of Nangarhar, Nuristan, Kunar, Khost, Paktia, and Paktika.

Under Operation Ghazab Lil Haq and carried and air strikes against Afghan Taliban positions in Kabul, Kandahar, Paktia, and Nangarhar were conducted by the Pakistan Army and Pakistan Air Force. Khawaja Asif, Pakistan's defense minister, announced the start of 'open war' between the two countries.

Pakistani officials stated that around 133 Taliban fighters were killed and more than 200 were injured during the clashes and subsequent operation. They further added that the airstrikes destroyed two corps headquarters, three brigade headquarters, two ammunition depots, one logistics base, three battalion headquarters, two sector headquarters, and more than 80 tanks, artillery pieces, and APCs (armoured personnel carriers). Pakistani officials also said that 27 border posts held by Taliban forces were destroyed and nine were captured. Taliban spokesperson Zabihullah Mujahid confirmed airstrikes in Kabul, Kandahar, Paktia, and several other locations, and stated that these airstrikes did not cause any casualties.

In Kabul, residents reported that airstrikes struck an ammunition depot near Darulaman, triggering hours of secondary explosions that rattled homes across the capital. Residents also reported hearing the sound of many ambulance sirens following the airstrike on the ammunition depot. Satellite images reviewed by The New York Times confirmed an airstrike on an ammunition depot in Kabul. Additionally, satellite imagery released by Planet Labs revealed damage at two locations in Kabul, which are 400 meters apart. In Gardez, scorch marks and damage to four buildings at a military base belonging to Taliban forces were visible from satellite imagery. Furthermore, NASA gathered and published data indicating a significant heat signature at the military base, suggesting that a sizeable fire had erupted at the site overnight.

In Kandahar, Pakistani officials released aerial footage of a large explosion at an ammunition depot near Kandahar International Airport. BBC News, using satellite imagery, confirmed the location of an ammunition depot in Kandahar. In Paktika, a video shared on social media showed smoke rising from a Taliban military base in the Urgun District. BBC News confirmed the location by matching roads and a distinctive foreground building with satellite imagery. Analysts at Maiar, an intelligence firm, stated that Pakistan's strikes on buildings and other infrastructure in Afghanistan appeared to be largely confined to military sites. They said that one of the buildings struck in Kabul appeared to be a military headquarters or command-and-control centre, and that vehicles parked nearby suggested the building had been occupied. In Kandahar, the analysts reported damage to at least two buildings within a large complex, which they assessed to be a headquarters of some kind.

PAF airstrikes in Kandahar province also struck the former home of Mullah Omar, the late founder of the Taliban, which was currently serving as a base for the Taliban's suicide unit. The property is located about one kilometer from the residence of the current Taliban leader, Hibatullah Akhundzada. According to local Afghan sources, about 15 Taliban members were killed in the strike. Elsewhere in the province, parts of Spin Boldak District were also struck. Additionally, Taliban forces' facility in Pul-e-Charkhi was also struck by the PAF. Following Pakistan's airstrikes on Kabul and Kandahar, Zabihullah Mujahid stated that the Taliban were ready to negotiate with Pakistan.

==== 27 February ====
In the morning, the PAF carried out airstrikes in parts of Paktika and Laghman provinces, according to local Afghan sources. The airstrike in Laghman targeted the 201 Khalid Ibn Walid Corps, while the one in Paktika struck a house. However, according to some Afghan sources, the Taliban-led Afghan armed forces base in Paktika was the one that was struck by the PAF. Afghan local sources also report an airstrike on the Taliban-led Afghan border brigade in Paktika province. Later the same day, at around noon, the Taliban-led Afghan border brigade in Gardez was also struck by an airstrike carried out by the PAF. An additional airstrike in parts of Nangarhar was also reported by local Afghan sources. The Taliban-led Afghan armed forces base in Khost Province was also struck in the airstrikes that were carried out on 27 February.

On the same day, the Taliban-led Afghan Ministry of Defense announced that it had carried out airstrikes in Pakistan targeting military sites in Faizabad, Nowshera, Jamrud, and Abbottabad. The ministry did not provide details about the type of aircraft or equipment allegedly used in the attacks. Pakistani officials, however, stated that attempts to strike in Abbottabad, Swabi, and Nowshera using small drones had been foiled using anti-drone systems. They denied that any strike had taken place in Faizabad or Jamrud, and said that these attacks were the work of the Pakistani Taliban rather than the Afghan Taliban. The drone in Swabi crashed near a girls' school, injuring a student. A quadcopter attack on a mosque in Bannu injured five worshippers. Pakistan subsequently imposed a countrywide ban on drone flights.

==== 28 February ====
In the early hours, clashes between Pakistan border guards and Afghan Taliban were reported along the border areas of Torkham. Later on, an airstrike was carried out by the PAF on Jalalabad Airport, the capital of Nangarhar province. An AFP journalist reported hearing sounds of two loud explosions from the direction of Jalalabad airport. Pakistan's media outlet also reported an airstrike in Nangarhar province targeting several Taliban headquarters. On the same day, Afghan forces claimed a Pakistani fighter was shot down over Jalalabad using anti-aircraft guns, with the pilot captured alive. Pakistan rejected the Afghan Taliban's claim, labeling it as wartime propaganda. Afterwards, the detained individual was severely beaten by the Afghan Taliban and locals, while being paraded through the market area in Jalalabad, with Taliban officials terming the event as an important war operation. However, later on, it was revealed that the pilot that Afghan forces captured was an ordinary Afghan national who was a parachutist and had no connection to the Pakistani army. Further investigation also revealed that news of downing a fighter jet was false, and the detained individual was later released.

Elsewhere, the PAF carried out airstrikes in parts of Khost, Kandahar provinces, and Kabul. Taliban-led Afghan government deputy spokesperson Hamdullah Fitrat said that 52 people had been killed and 66 others injured as a result of Pakistani attacks on the provinces of Paktika, Khost, Kunar, Nangarhar, and Kandahar.

The Pakistani officials said that the PAF had targeted 41 locations in Afghanistan, including brigade and battalion headquarters in Nangarhar province and an army headquarters in Kandahar province.

==== 1 March Bagram Air Strikes ====
In the early hours, the PAF conducted airstrikes in Kabul with locals reporting hearing sounds of explosions and gunfire in several parts of Kabul, including Darulaman, and areas near the airport and Kārte Naw. According to residents, Pakistani fighter aircraft began patrolling and conducting intermittent strikes at about 20:30 local time on 28 February; explosions and gunfire were reported until about 06:00 the following morning. Residents also report hearing sound of explosions and gunfire around Shash Darak neighborhood. Shash Darak is home to several Afghan government and intelligence facilities, including Directorate 40 of the Taliban's intelligence service and offices of the Urban Development Ministry. Afghanistan's Ministry of Defense said that air-defense fire had been directed at Pakistani aircraft over Kabul and advised residents not to be alarmed. Later that day, the PAF carried out airstrikes on Bagram Airfield. Taliban officials claimed Pakistan's fighter jets attempted to bomb the base but were repelled by anti-aircraft fire and that no damage was sustained. However, satellite imagery published by The New York Times showed a hangar and two warehouses at the base had been destroyed. Pakistani officials later confirmed the strike on Bagram and said it also destroyed military supplies.

On the same day, the Afghan Ministry of Defence said it had carried out airstrikes on Pakistan's military sites in Khyber Pakhtunkhwa and Balochistan, without specifying the type of aircraft or aerial equipment used. Pakistan's Ministry of Information and Broadcasting rejected the claim and described it as false, stating that no evidence such as satellite imagery, flight data, ground footage, or eyewitness accounts had been provided to substantiate it. In Pakistan's Mohmand District, a drone crashed at Governor Model High School, causing no casualties or significant structural damage. Following the incident, Pakistani officials temporarily closed a number schools close to the border areas.

Later that day, Pakistani officials said that Operation Ghazab lil-Haq was ongoing and that, since the start of hostilities, 415 Afghan Taliban fighters had been killed and more than 580 wounded. According to the officials, Pakistan's forces had destroyed 182 Taliban posts, captured 31 others, and disabled 185 tanks and armoured personnel carriers. The officials further add that the PAF conducted airstrikes at 46 locations inside Afghanistan. The officials also released footage that they said showed Pakistani troops crossing into Afghanistan from North Waziristan and capturing a border outpost belonging to Afghan Taliban. Elsewhere, Pakistan's security forces claimed to have taken control of 32 km^{2} (12 sq mi) of Ghudwana, a strategic Afghan territory in Paktika Province.

==== 2 March Panjshir-Kapisa Air Strikes ====
On 2 March, the PAF conducted airstrikes in Kabul which were confirmed by Taliban officials. According to Afghan local sources, the PAF also carried out airstrikes in parts of Panjshir, Kapisa, and Nangarhar provinces. In the provinces of Panjshir and Kapisa, local sources reported that, for the third consecutive night, they had heard aircraft, explosions, and ground-to-air gunfire. According to residents, scattered gunfire was also heard in the area known as Darband Mountain, which connects Panjshir, Kapisa, and Parwan. While in Nangarhar province, Pakistan's warplane bombed a Taliban-led Afghan armed forces' border brigade near the provincial capital Jalalabad.

==== 2 March Panjshir-Kapisa-Badakshan-Herat-Kabul Air Strikes ====
On 3 March, the PAF conducted airstrikes in parts of Panjshir, Kabul, Badakhshan, Herat, and Kapisa. Residents of Kabul reported that the city had been subjected to daily airstrikes over the past six days. In Panjshir, residents reported hearing a loud explosion, and said that the Bazarak area was shaken by a strong tremor. In Herat, residents stated that fighter jets were patrolling over the city's airport and that gunfire was heard from the airport. In Badakhshan, residents reported that an airstrike had taken place in Fayzabad. Taliban officials did not release any official details regarding these airstrikes. A PAF airstrike was also reported in Afghanistan's Nuristan province.

As per the Taliban spokesperson, 110 Afghan civilians had been killed, while 120 others had been wounded. The spokesperson added that Pakistani attacks in Afghanistan have damaged public facilities, mosques, and houses. The spokesperson also said that Afghanistan has approached Russia, China, the European Union, and United Kingdom to help end the war. The spokesperson warned that as long as Pakistan's attacks inside Afghanistan will continue, Taliban forces will keep on responding. A spokesperson for Taliban-led Afghan Ministry of Defense said that Taliban forces has the ability to block Pakistan's air operations inside Afghanistan.

Pakistani officials added that since the start of hostilities 56 locations across Afghanistan targeted in air strikes.

==== 4 March Kandahar Air Brigade and 205 Al-Badr Corps Airstrikes ====
On 4 March, armed clashes between Taliban forces and Pakistani border guards continued in the border areas of Zabul, Kandahar, Khost, and Kunar provinces. An Afghan media outlet quoting local sources in several provinces report that many of the Pakistani strikes in recent days appeared to have targeted Taliban military facilities. They also reported that, over the previous week, the military corps of the Taliban-led Afghan armed forces in Nangarhar province had been struck by the PAF. On the same day, the PAF carried out multiple airstrikes in Kandahar targeting the Taliban-led Afghan armed forces' air brigade, the third battalion of the border police, and the 205 Al-Badr Corps. Taliban officials had not commented on the reports of airstrikes on military sites in Kandahar province. Pakistani officials added that they had destroyed an ammunition depot and headquarters of 205 Corps brigade headquarters in Kandahar. Pakistani officials added that Pakistani airstrikes had targeted 62 locations across Afghanistan.

==== 7 March ====
On 7 March, Pakistani officials stated that PAF had carried out air strikes along the Pakistan-Afghanistan border, destroying several Afghan Taliban positions. The officials added the airstrikes inflicted heavy casualties on the Taliban forces, forcing them to abandon and flee from those positions. Meanwhile, Taliban officials said that Pakistani forces had bombed the provinces of Paktia, Paktika, Khost, Maidan Wardak, and Kunar, resulting in civilian casualties and damage to homes and shops. Taliban officials did not comment on the casualties suffered by their forces. Taliban officials also urged the United Nations Security Council (UNSC) to take action to stop Pakistan's attacks. They cited recent strikes on several Afghan provinces, civilian casualties, displacement, and the expulsion and harassment of Afghan refugees in Pakistan, and called on the UNSC to help end the situation.

On 8 March, Pakistani officials stated that since the start of hostilities, 583 Afghan Taliban operatives had been killed and more than 795 injured. They added that Pakistani forces had destroyed 242 check-posts, captured 38 others, destroyed 213 tanks, armored vehicles, and artillery guns, and targeted 64 locations across Afghanistan in PAF air strikes.

==== 9 March Shaheen Base Paktika Airstrikes ====
On 9 March, Pakistani officials stated that PAF destroyed an ammunition depot at Shaheen Base in Paktika province, Pakistani officials released a video of PAF airstrikes on ammunition depot at Shaheen Base in Paktika.

==== 10 March ====
On 10 March, Taliban officials said that Pakistani forces had carried out airstrikes in parts of Paktika, Paktia, Khost, and Nuristan provinces, killing three civilians and injuring three others. In Pakistan's Mohmand district, Pakistani Taliban militants clashed with police, resulting in no casualties on either side.

==== 13 March Kandahar Oil Depot Strikes ====
On 13 March, the PAF launched multiple airstrikes targeting areas in Kabul, Kandahar, Paktia, and Paktika. Taliban spokesman said that Pakistan's airstrike caused civilian casualties and destroyed a fuel depot of the Kam Air airline.Pakistani officials denied Taliban's spokesman allegations and stated that PAF targeted Taliban military sites and infrastructure in the provinces of Kabul, Kandahar and Paktia. They said the strikes hit facilities linked to 313 Corps and an ammunition depot in Kabul, the Tarawo training center and logistical infrastructure, including a fuel depot, in Kandahar, and the Sher-e-Nau militant camp in Paktia.

14 March Pakistani attempted airstrikes on Taliban leader Habitullah Akhunzada in Kandahar

Pakistani officials stated that the Pakistan Air Force had carried out airstrikes on five military bases in Kandahar, including the General Directorate of Intelligence (GDI), Haibatullah Akhundzada's special forces unit, the border command, a tunnel, and a Taliban technical equipment warehouse. Pakistani officials added that the targeted military sites had been destroyed and released videos and images of the strikes in Kandahar. Locals in Kandahar told an Agence France-Presse journalist that military aircraft had flown over a mountain housing a military facility before an explosion was heard. Afghan locals sources state that Pakistani airstrikes struck a Taliban special forces facility linked to Hibatullah Akhundzada, as well as an ammunition depot and a border command center in Kandahar Province. The special forces site, located near a compound associated with Mullah Omar, was described as one of Akhundzada's most trusted units. Afghan locals also reported an airstrike in Spin Boldak District, while armed clashes resumed between Taliban forces and Pakistani border guards in Khost. However, a Taliban spokesperson claimed that no one had been hurt in the airstrikes and that they had caused only limited damage to a drug rehabilitation centre and an empty container.

==== 16 March ====
On 16 March, Pakistan said that its forces launched multiple airstrikes against Taliban military installations in Kabul and Nangarhar, and claimed that it destroyed ammo storages and "technical support infrastructure". Taliban claimed that Pakistani strikes on Khost province killed four civilians and wounded nine, and destroyed civilian infrastructure in Kunar and Paktika province with 43 rounds being fired into Shkin district.

On 16 March around night time an airstrike hit a hospital in Kabul, Pakistani forces claimed that the hospital was a drone factory which was denied by Afghanistan and some international organizations. The site was a military camp used by the afghan army during the Afghanistan war and later turned into a hospital.

Following the strikes, Afghanistan claimed that a Pakistani airstrike struck the Omid Addiction Treatment Hospital in Kabul, reportedly killing over 200 people, mostly drug addicts undergoing treatment at the drug rehabilitation facility. Pakistan denied the claims and said that it had only targeted Taliban military installations. While the health ministry spokesperson maintained that there were "more than 200 martyrs and more than 200 injured," deputy government spokesperson Hamdullah Fitrat claimed death toll was at least "double" that, with 250 wounded. Zabihullah Mujahid declared it a "crime against humanity".

24 March 209 Al Fatah Corps strikes, Balkh

Following the expiration of temporary ceasefire that lasted between 18 and 24 March during the Islamic holiday of Eid al-Fitr, on the request of Saudi Arabia, Qatar, and Turkey., Pakistani Air Force carried out a drone strike targeting the 209 Al-Fatah Corps in Balkh province during the night of 24 March, according to local Afghan sources.

=== June 2026 Afghanistan-Pakistan border airstrikes ===
Pakistan Air Force launched fresh wave of airstrikes in Khost, Kunar and Paktika provinces of Afghanistan bordering Pakistan. The Pakistani airstrikes targeted Spera and Barmal districts of Khost and Paktika respectively. The airstrikes came in a retaliation against TTP for their terrorist attack in which TTP militants stormed a security post in the Hassan Khel area near Peshawar, resulting in the death of six security personnel of Pakistan's Federal Constabulary, just a day before Pakistani airstrikes. The Afghan Taliban alleged Pakistani airstrikes for the death of 11 children. Pakistan's Information Minister Attaullah Tarar said airstrikes targeted hideouts and safehavens of Pakistani Taliban, famously known as the TTP, along the Afghanistan-Pakistan border. Tarar said Pakistani strikes elimanated 26 TTP terrorists, including a training centre, an ammunition cache and hideouts of TTP Commanders Mullah Aleem Khan Khushali and Mufti Akhtar Muhammad Jani Khel. Taliban official in Khost Province confirmed that airstrikes resulted in the killing of 9 people and wounding 10 other. In the neighbouring Paktika Province residents told AFP an attack killed three people and destroyed a home.

==== 28 June 2026 Pakistani airstrikes in Afghanistan ====
Pakistan Air Force carried out airstrikes in Gayan District of Paktika, Tsamkani district of Paktia and Manogai District of Kunar Provinces of Afghanistan on the night of 28–29 June 2026. Pakistan's Information Minister Attaullah Tarar confirmed Pakistani strikes while stating strikes were part of Pakistan's Operation Ghazab-lil-Haq. The Pakistani Information tweeted on X that the Pakistani airstrikes were part of a retaliation to Pakistan Rangers (Sindh) Camp, Karachi terrorist attack that took place just a day prior to Pakistani airstrikes and claimed by the Afghanistan-based Jamat-ul-Ahrar. As per Pakistani officials, aistrikes targeted the hideouts and safe havens of terrorists belonging to Jamaat ul Ahrar and Pakistani Taliban, killing twenty nine terrorists.

=== September 2026 Pakistani airstrikes in Afghanistan ===
==== 21 September 2026 Pakistani airstrikes in Afghanistan ====
On 21 September 2026, Pakistan Air Force carried out airstrikes in Patan village of Nurgal District in the Kunar Province and Rokha and Tor Kundi villages of Barmal District of Paktika province of Afghanistan.Information Ministery of Pakistan said airstrike targeted hideouts and safehavens of Pakistani Taliban, killing at least 28 terrorists. Spokesperson of Afghan Taliban denied Pakistani claim of sheltering Pakistani Taliban while vowing retaliation against Pakistan. Pakistan released video of its airstrikes hitting Kunar and Paktika.

==== 24 September 2026 Pakistani airstrikes in Afghanistan ====
On 24 September 2026, Pakistan Air Force, while retaliating Taliban drone incursions across Pakistan-Afghanistan Border, carried out airstrikes against 10 locations across three provinces of Afghanistan including Kandahar, Paktia and Khost. Pakistani Information Minister Attaullah Tarar stated that the Pakistan Military executed precise aerial and drone operations targeting 10 locations associated with drone launch and weapon storage infrastructure of Afghan Taliban. The airstrikes targetted Mandozai, Ismail Khel and Gurbaz Districts of Khost. In Gardez District Paktia Province, Pakistani airstrikes targetted 203rd Corps of Afghan Taliban whereas in Kandahar Province, Pakistan Air Force hit compound ''Sarai Mullah Sahib'', a former residence of Taliban's founder Mullah Omar. Sarai Mullah is located in the 9th Police District of Kandahar. Reports say Sarai Mullah Sahib compound was being used by the Special Forces of Taliban deployed on the security of Taliban Supreme Leader Mullah Habitullah Akhunzada. .

== Structure ==
=== Headquarters ===
- Air Headquarters (AHQ), Islamabad

=== Commands ===
- Air Defence Command (ADC), Rawalpindi
- Northern Air Command (NAC), Peshawar
- Central Air Command (CAC), Lahore
- Southern Air Command (SAC), Karachi
- Western Air Command (WAC), Quetta
- Federal Air Command (FAC), Rawalpindi
- Air Force Strategic Command (AFSC), Islamabad
- PAF Cyber Command (PAFCC), Islamabad
- PAF Space Command (PAFSC), Islamabad

=== Training establishments ===
- Pakistan Air Force Academy, Risalpur
- Combat Commanders' School (CCS), Sargodha
- PAF Airpower Centre of Excellence (PAF ACE), Sargodha
- PAF Air War College, Karachi
- Air University, Islamabad

=== Weapons production establishments ===
- Pakistan Aeronautical Complex (PAC), Kamra.
- Air Weapons Complex (AWC), Wah Cantonment.
- Precision Engineering Complex (Private) Limited
- National Aerospace Science & Technology Park

=== Bases ===
The PAF has 27 airbases of which 19 are flying bases and 8 are non-flying bases. Flying bases are operational bases from which aircraft operate during both peacetime and wartime; whereas non-flying bases conduct either training, administration, maintenance, air defence operations, or mission support.

==== Flying bases ====
1. PAF Base Mushaf (Sargodha)
2. PAF Base Bholari (Bholari) Jamshoro District, Sindh
3. PAF Base Masroor (Karachi)
4. PAF Base Rafiqui (Shorkot)
5. PAF Base Peshawar (Peshawar)
6. PAF Base Murid (Chakwal)
7. PAF Base Samungli (Quetta)
8. PAF Base M.M. Alam (Mianwali)
9. PAF Base Minhas (Kamra)
10. PAF Base Nur Khan (Rawalpindi)
11. PAF Base Faisal (Karachi)
12. PAF Base Risalpur (Pakistan Air Force Academy) (Risalpur)
13. PAF Base Shahbaz (Jacobabad)
14. PAF Base Farid (Rajanpur)
15. PAF Base Vehari (Vehari)
16. PAF Base Qadri (Skardu)
17. PAF Base Sindhri (Mirpur Khas)
18. PAF Base Talhar (Badin)
19. PAF Base Multan (Multan)
20. PAF Base Sukkur (Sukkur, Pakistan)

==== Non-flying bases ====
- PAF Base Korangi Creek (Karachi)
- PAF Base Malir (Karachi)
- PAF Base Lower Topa (Murree)
- PAF Base Kallar Kahar (Kallar Kahar)
- PAF Base Kohat (Kohat)
- PAF Base Lahore (Lahore)
- PAF Base Sakesar (Sakesar)
- PAF Base Kalabagh (Nathia Gali)

=== Rank structure ===
==== Commissioned officer ranks ====
The rank insignia of commissioned officers.

Rank group	General / flag officers					Senior officers			Junior officers
Pakistan Air Force
Pakistan Air Force	Marshal of the Pakistan Air Force	Air chief marshal	Air marshal	Air vice marshal	Air commodore	Group captain	Wing commander	Squadron leader	Flight lieutenant	Flying officer	Pilot officer
Pakistan Air Force	سالار فضائیہ	امیرسالار فضائیہ	سالار فضائیہ	سالار فضائیہ مقابل	عَمِيد الفضاء	سردار جماعت	شارف الجناح	قائدِ دستہ	نقیبِ پرواز	منصبِ طیار	منصبِ پائلٹ

==== Other ranks ====
The rank insignia of non-commissioned officers and enlisted personnel.

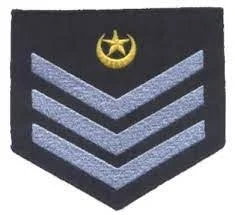
Rank group	Senior NCOs					Junior NCOs		Enlisted
Pakistan Air Force
Pakistan Air Force	Chief warrant officer	Warrant officer	Assistant warrant officer	Chief technician	Senior technician	Corporal technician	Junior technician	Senior aircraftman	Leading aircraftman	Aircraftman

Civilian occupations

- Gazetted Officer
- Steganographer
- Stenotypist
- Warehouse and Factory Personnel
- Clerk

=== Special forces ===
The Pakistan Air Force's Special Services Wing (SSW) is the branch's elite special operations fighting force. Originally coming into existence following the Indo-Pakistani War of 1965, the SSW is heavily modelled off of the United States Air Force's Special Tactics Squadrons with some elements inspired by the United States Army Rangers. The unit remained active but saw little prioritisation by the Pakistani military until after the Kargil War. In late 1999, the SSW was largely revived and restructured for active service and is currently fielding around 1,200 troops.

=== Religious minorities in the Pakistan Air Force ===
Since its inception, religious minorities have been free to pursue careers within the Pakistan Armed Forces, with the exception of Hindus until 2001. Following its involvement in the global U.S.-led war on terror, Pakistan released the Hindu minority in the country from the discriminatory law and granted them the same freedoms that were already present for their Christian, Sikh and other various counterparts. Some notable religious minority figures in the Pakistan Air Force include: Air Vice Marshal Eric Gordon Hall, a Christian who served as the Base Commander of Chaklala Air Base during the Indo-Pakistani War of 1965. Air Commodore Nazir Latif and Group Captain Cecil Chaudhry (both Christians) fought in the Indo-Pakistani War of 1965 and later helped establish the Combat Commanders School (CCS). Wing Commander Melvin Leslie Middlecoat was the Commanding Officer of No. 9 Squadron during the 1965 war, he and Squadron Leader Peter Christy fought and were KIA in the Indo-Pakistani War of 1971. Patrick Desmond Callaghan was another Christian officer who rose to the rank of Air Vice Marshal. Wing Commander Ronald Felix has been a notable Christian pilot known for being the first to fly the jointly-built Chinese and Pakistani JF-17 Thunder fighter jet since 2010 and was one of two PAF pilots flying the JF-17 at the 2011 Izmir Air Show in Turkey.

In 2020, the Pakistan Air Force recruited Rahul Dev, a Hindu from Tharparkar, Sindh in a major breakthrough for the Hindu minority from this remote distant area of Sindh. He was commissioned as a general duty pilot officer on 6 May 2020.

== Equipment ==
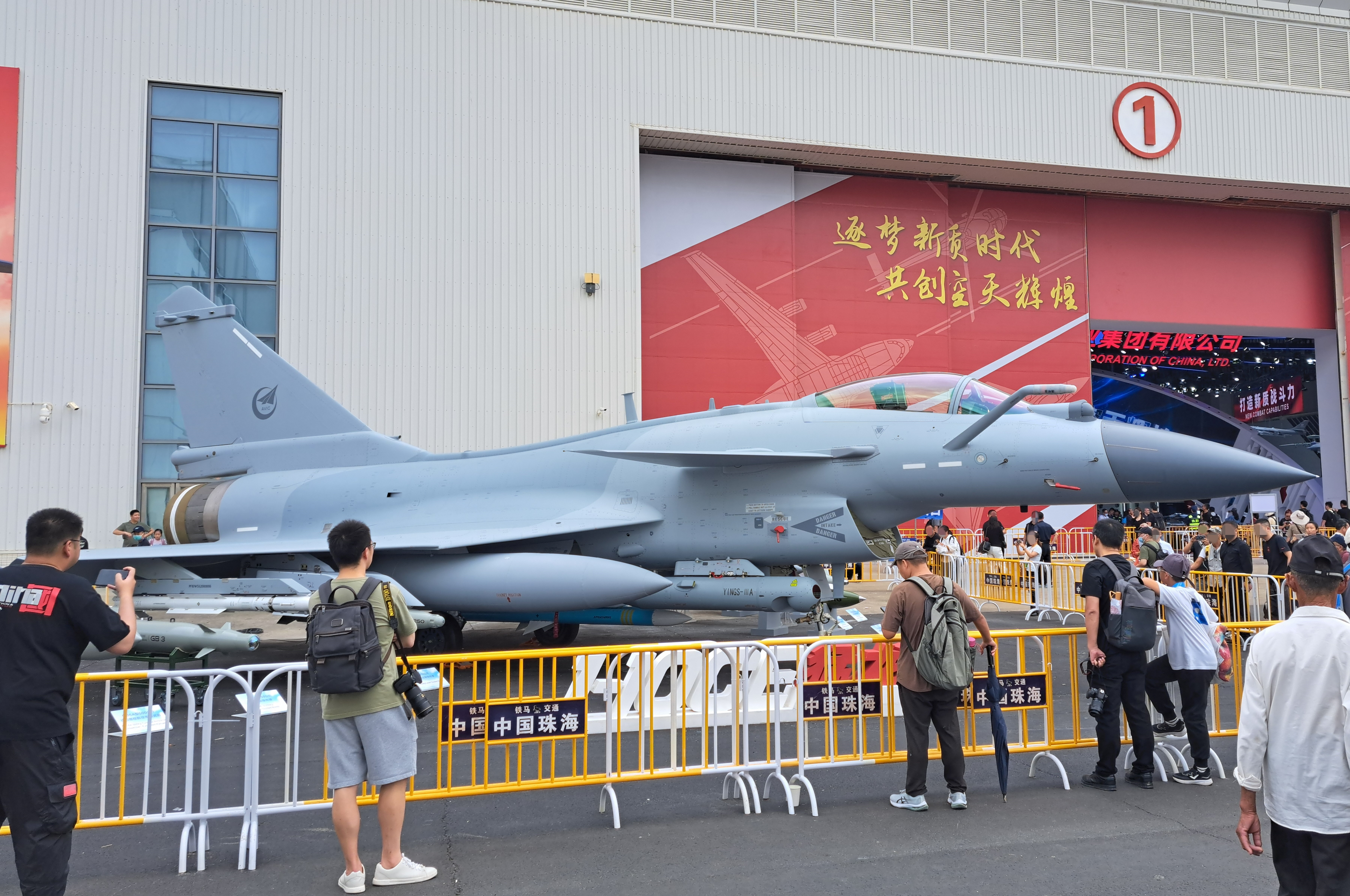
A CAC J-10 C

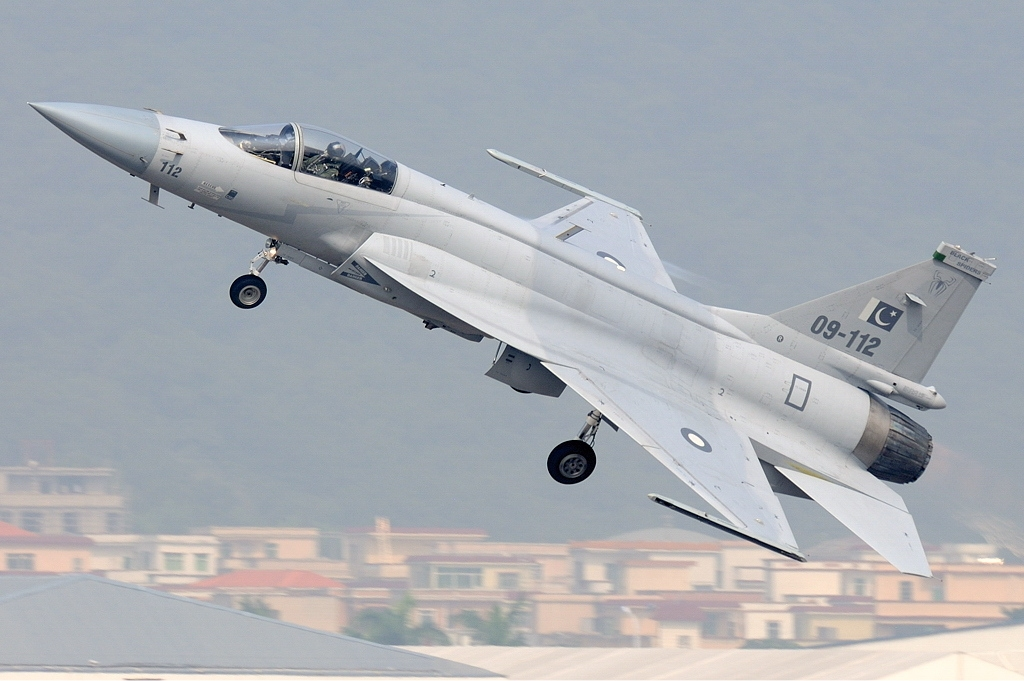
A PAC JF-17 taking off from Zhuhai Jinwan Airport

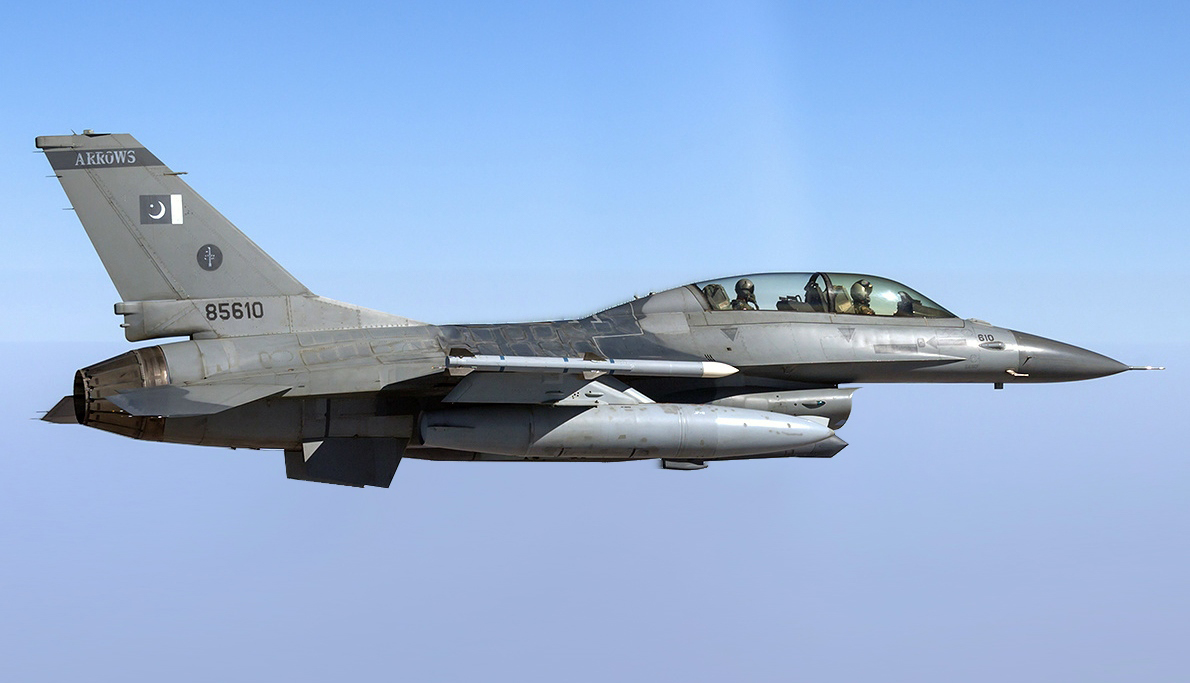
A Pakistani F-16BM in flight

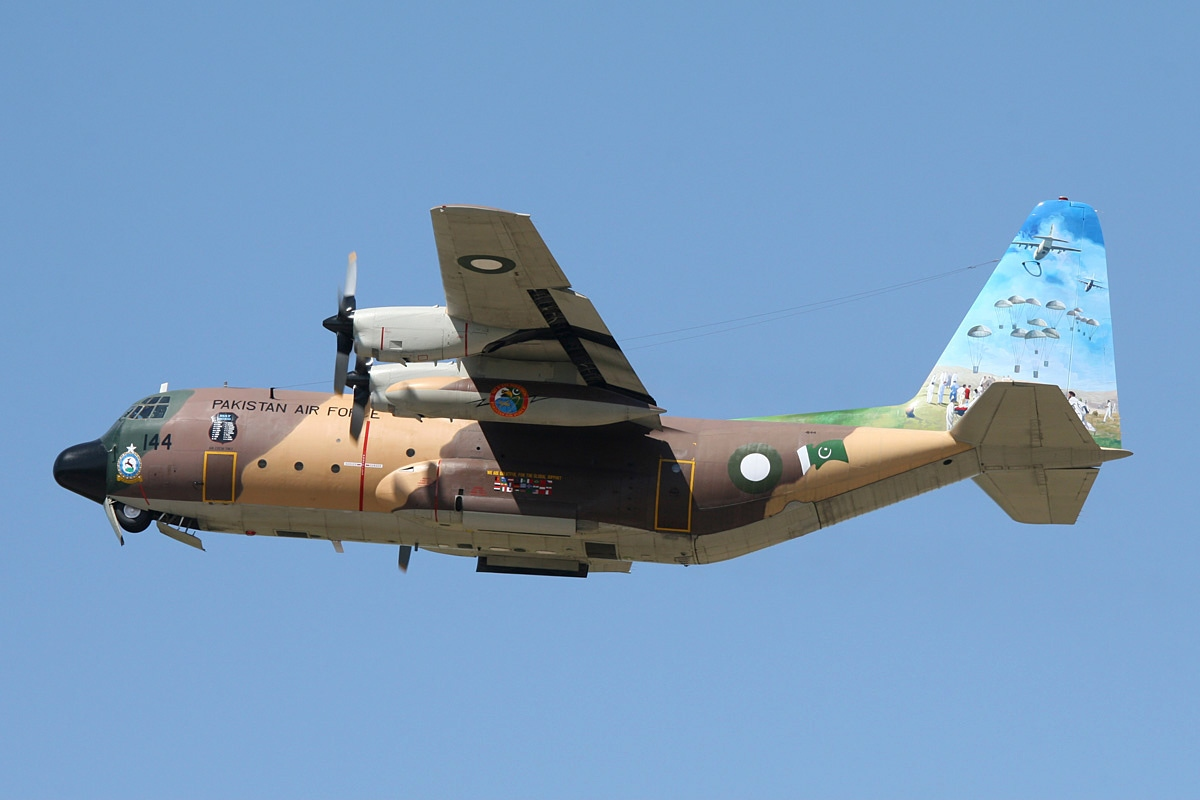
A Lockheed L-100 Hercules departing RIAT 2006

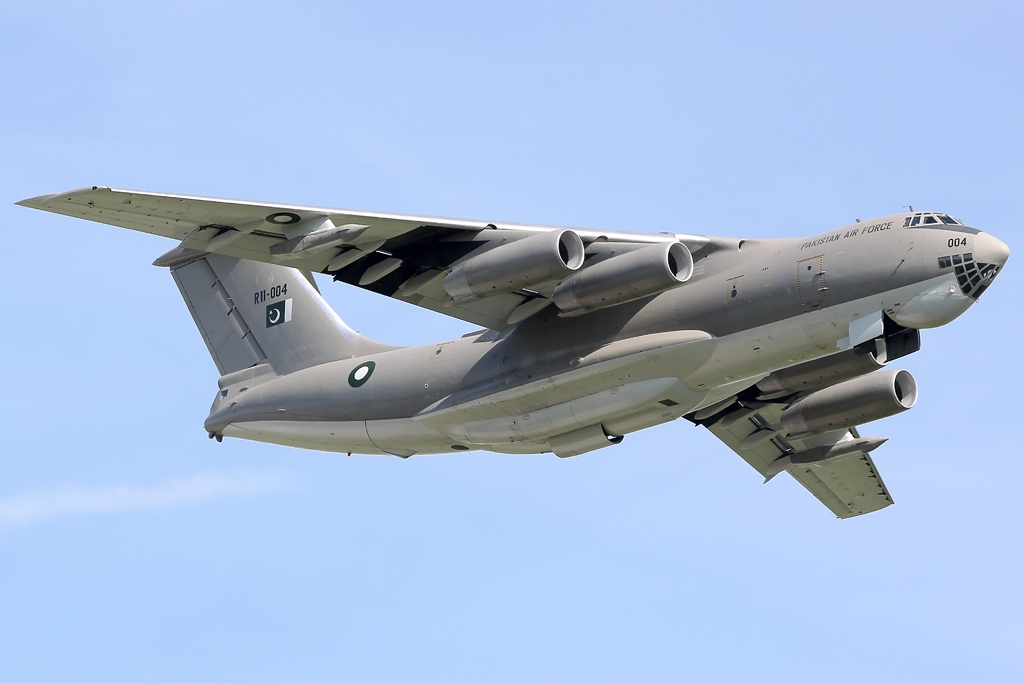
A Ilyushin Il-78 over Pisa International

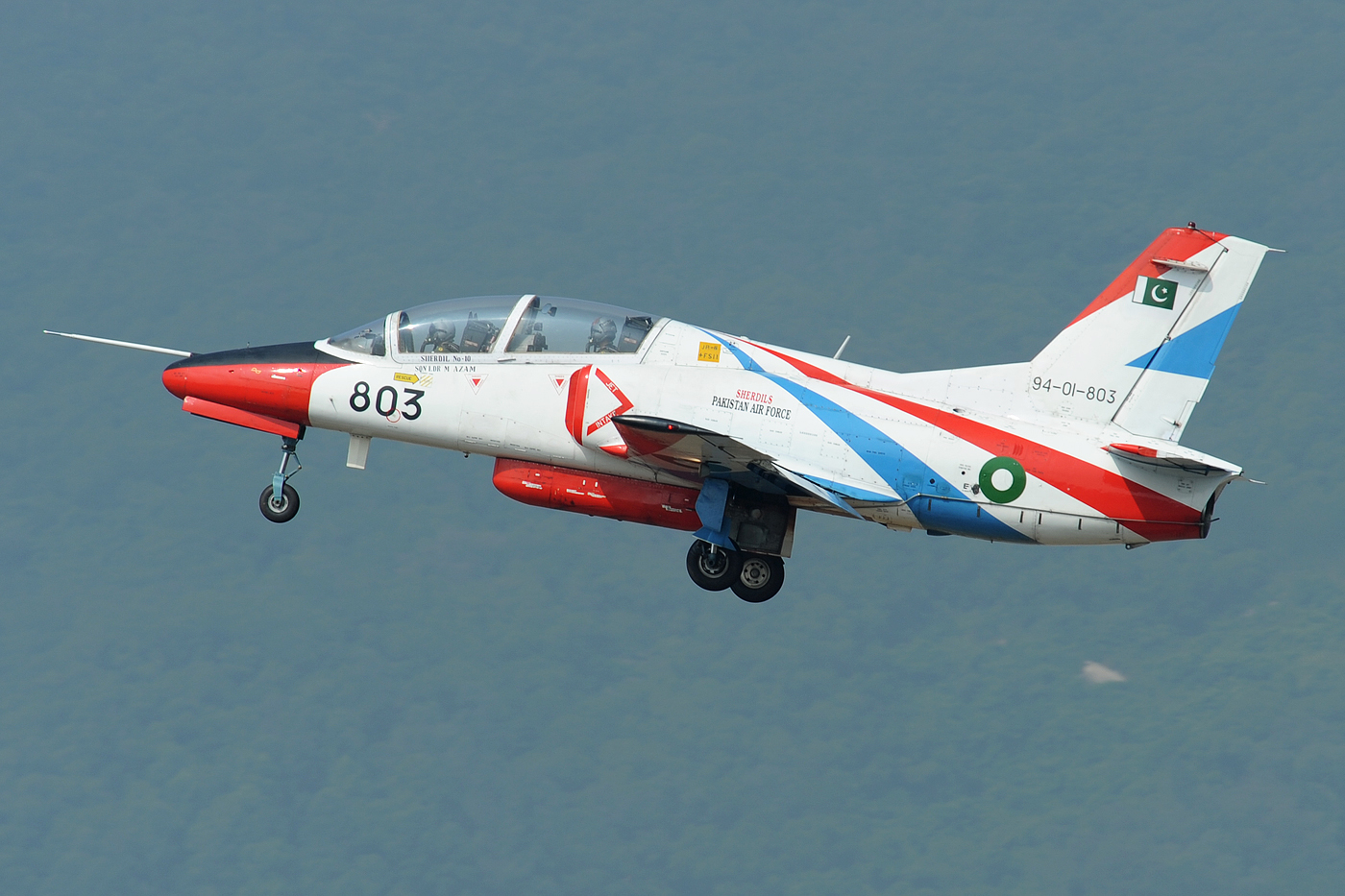
A Pakistani Hongdu JL-8 trainer

=== Combat aircraft ===
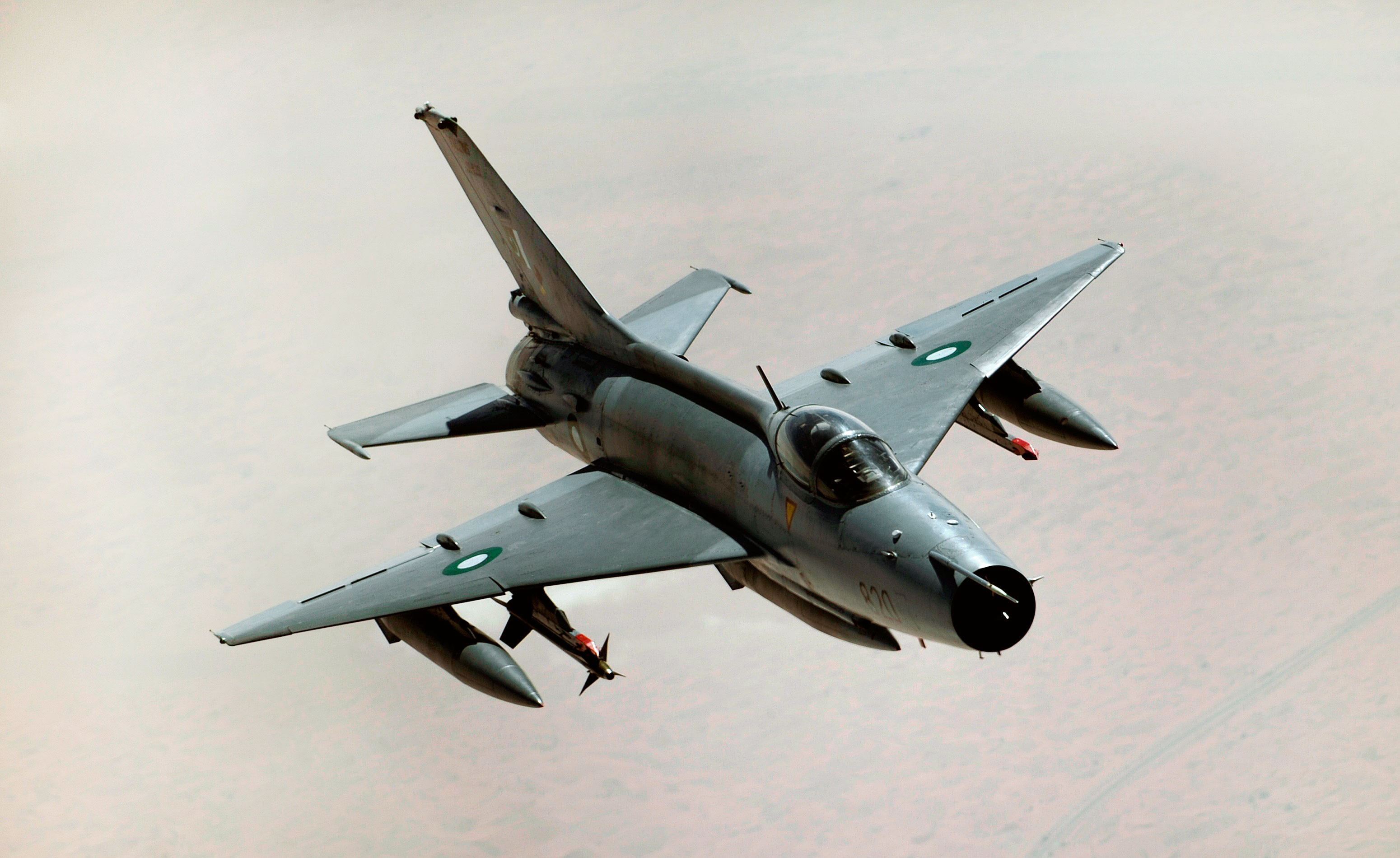
PAF Chengdu F-7PG in flight.

- Chengdu J-10C: The J-10C is a multirole combat aircraft. The PAF have ordered at least 25 aircraft on 25 June 2021, with the number is expected to rise to at least 36. In March 2022, the initial batches of J-10s began to arrive in Pakistan, with at least 12 aircraft in operation in September 2022.
- PAC/CAC JF-17 Thunder: A multirole combat aircraft produced by Pakistan with Chinese assistance, the JF-17 was developed to replace Pakistan's aging fleets of A-5C, F-7P/PG, Mirage III, and Mirage 5 aircraft. Currently, 149 JF-17s are in active service with the PAF, comprising 47 JF-17A Block 1, 62 JF-17A Block 2, and 25 JF-17B Block 2 variants. A further 50 aircraft of the Block III model, incorporating advanced avionics systems and a new AESA radar, are expected to be produced. In addition the PAF is also expected to order 26 of the two-seat JF-17B variant. The JF-17 is set to become the "backbone" of the PAF alongside its fleet of American F-16s.
- General Dynamics F-16 Fighting Falcon: The F-16 Fighting Falcon currently serves as the primary air fighter of the Pakistan Air Force (PAF) in addition to its ground attack capabilities. The PAF currently has ≈75 F-16s in active service, comprising 44 F-16AM/BM Block 15 MLU, 13 F-16A/B ADF and 18 F-16C/D Block 52+ variants.
- Dassault Mirage III: Having been in service since 1967, the Mirage III, together with the Mirage 5, serves as the primary strike aircraft of the PAF. The PAF operates more than 80 Mirage III aircraft, comprising multiple variants including the Mirage IIIEP, IIIEL and IIIO fighter-bomber variants, the latter of which have been upgraded under Project ROSE, the Mirage IIIRP reconnaissance variant and the Mirage IIIBE, IIID, IIIDL and IIIDP training variants, the latter of which have also been upgraded under Project ROSE.
- Dassault Mirage 5: The Mirage 5, together with the Mirage III, serves as the PAF's primary strike aircraft. The PAF operates around 90 Mirage 5 aircraft of multiple variants, including Mirage 5PA, PA2, PA3 and 5F ground attack aircraft, the latter of which have been upgraded under Project ROSE, the Mirage 5DR reconnaissance variant and the Mirage 5DD and DPA2 training variants.
- Chengdu F-7PG: The Chengdu F-7 serves primarily as an interceptor, and around 140 aircraft are in service. The PAF has phased out its F-7P aircraft from active service, replaced by the JF-17 Thunder. The F-7PG variant remains the primary variant to remain in service with the PAF, while the two seat FT-7PG variant is in use as an operational conversion trainer.

=== Special mission aircraft ===
- Saab 2000: The PAF has been operating the Saab 2000 using the Erieye radar as its primary AEW&C platform since 2009. Out of the original four Saab 2000 in service, one was destroyed and two were damaged in a Taliban attack on PAF Base Minhas in August 2012. The damaged aircraft were subsequently repaired and put back into service. The PAF had ordered three more Erieye AEW&C aircraft from Saab with the first batch having been delivered in 2017.
- Shaanxi Y-8: Four ZDK-03 variants, locally designated the Karakoram Eagle, are in service. They incorporate a Chinese AESA radar mounted on a Y-8F-600 airframe.
- Dassault Falcon 20: The PAF operates three modified Dassault Falcon 20 aircraft with a primary role in electronic warfare.

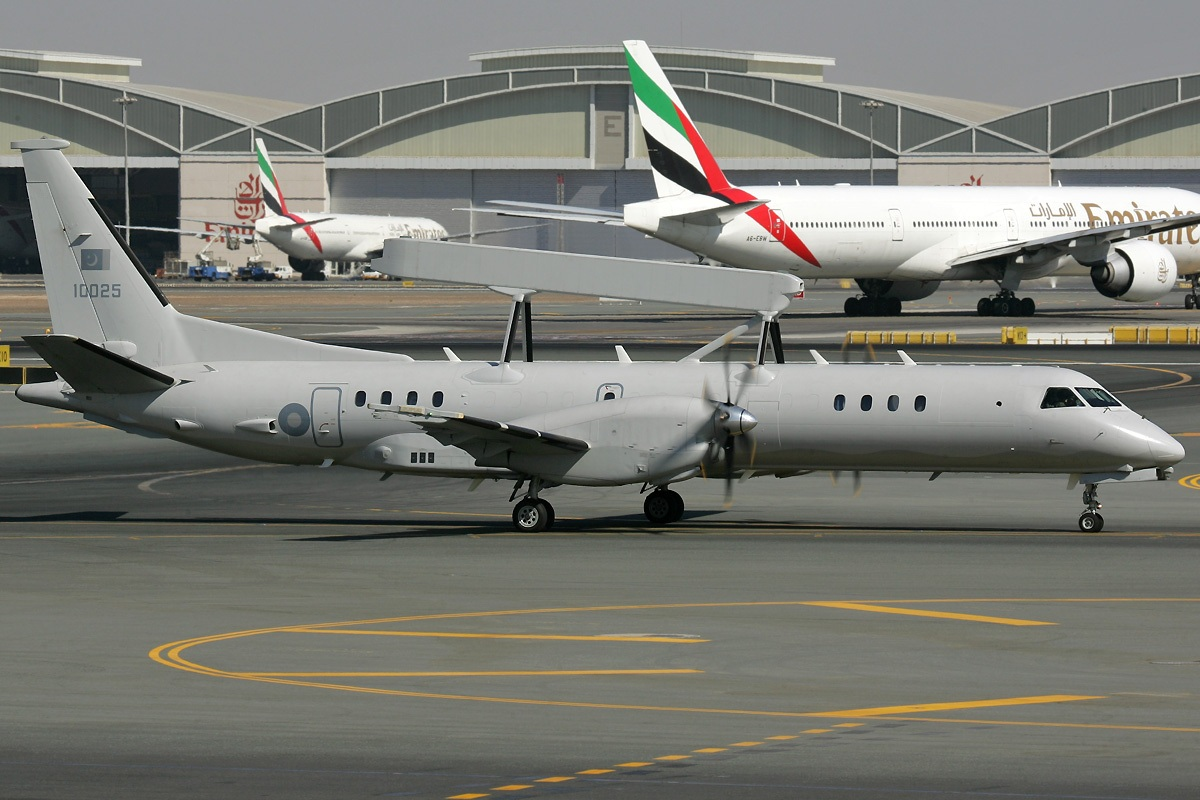
Saab 2000 Erieye AEW&C

=== Transport aircraft ===
- Lockheed C-130 Hercules: The C-130 Hercules has served as the backbone of the PAF's transport fleet since its induction in 1962. 15 aircraft, five C-130Bs, nine C-130Es and one L-100, are currently in service. PAF C-130s have been upgraded with Allison T56-A-15 turboprops and extended fatigue lives.
- Harbin Y-12: Three Harbin Y-12 are operated as light utility aircraft by the PAF.
- Gulfstream IV: The PAF currently operates two Gulfstream IV-SP variants.
- Embraer Phenom 100: Approximately four of these aircraft are in service with the PAF for transportation purposes.
- Cessna Citation Excel: Currently, only one of these aircraft are used by the PAF.
- Ilyushin Il-78: The PAF operates four Il-78MPs which can also be used as a general transporter by removing the refuel tanks from the cargo hold.

=== Aerial refuelling aircraft ===
- Ilyushin Il-78: The PAF operates four Il-78MPs equipped with UPAZ refuelling pods, procured from Ukraine, as aerial refuelling tankers.

=== Trainer aircraft ===
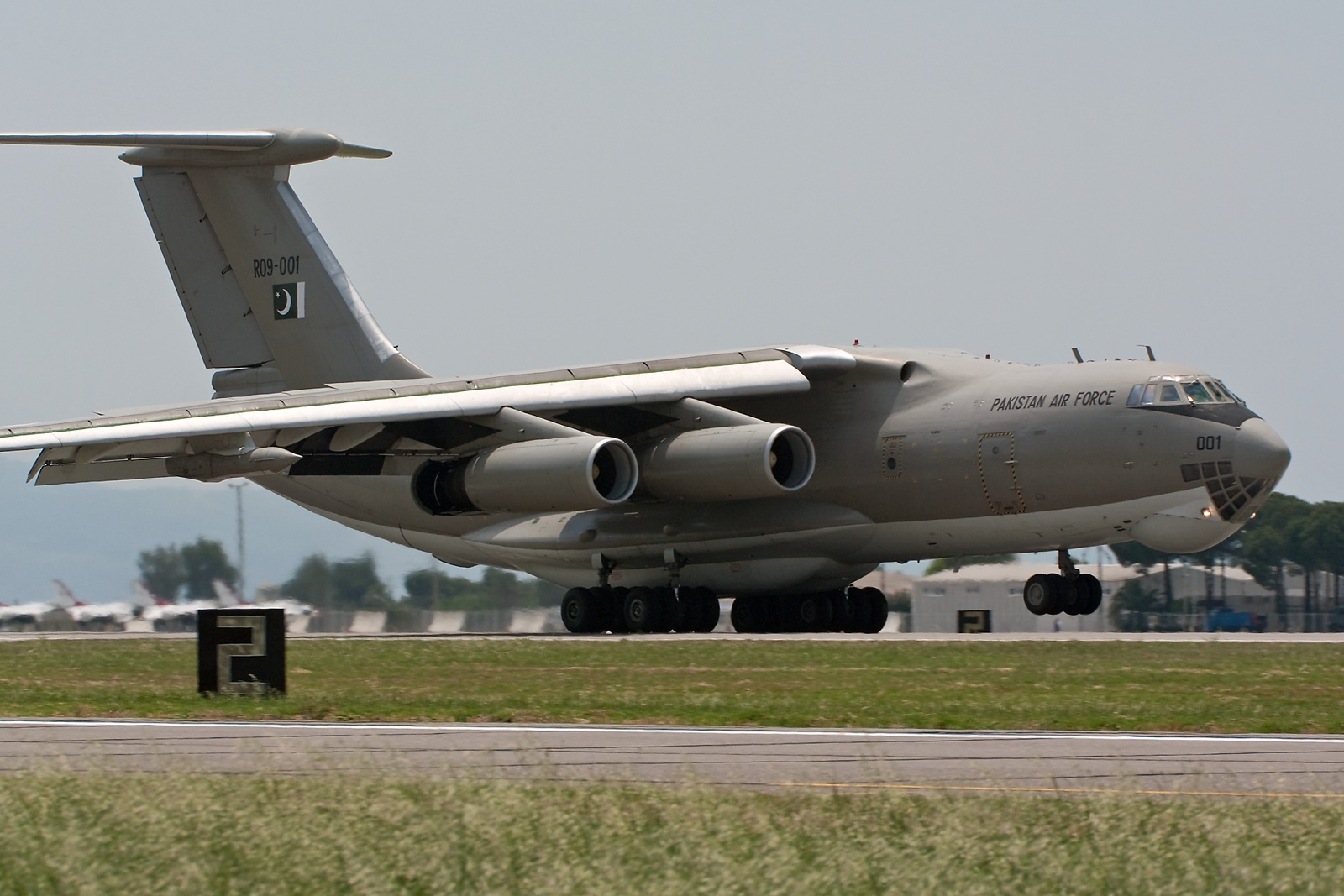
Il-78 aircraft of the Pakistan Air Force

- PAC MFI-17 Mushshak: The Mushshak serves as the PAF's basic trainer. The PAF operates 120 Mushshak aircraft, including the improved Super Mushshak variant.
- Cessna T-37 Tweet: The PAF has operated the T-37 as a basic jet trainer since 1962, and these have been supplemented over the years with additional aircraft from Turkey and the United States.
- Hongdu JL-8: The K-8 is operated as an intermediate trainer, before cadets move on to conversion trainers. The K-8 is also operated by the PAF's aerobatics display team, the Sherdils.

=== Helicopters ===
- AgustaWestland AW139: Beginning in 2018, the PAF started inducting the AW139 to replace the venerable Alouette. The first AW139 unit became operational in March of that same year.
- Mil Mi-17: The PAF also operates the Mi-171, which serves primarily in CSAR roles.

=== Air defence systems ===
- MBDA Spada 2000 – A medium altitude air defence system consisting of a radar with a range of 60 kilometres and four 6-cell missile launchers that can intercept enemy missiles and aircraft at a range of over 20 kilometres. A contract for ten batteries was signed when Aspide was selected over competing systems from Raytheon, Diehl BGT and Saab AB after pre-contract firing tests in Pakistan with assistance from the Italian Air Force. Reports state that Pakistan tested the air defence system in July 2010, following deliveries of the first few batteries. Deliveries of all ten batteries are reported to have been completed in 2013 with further orders possible upon immediate request. The missile system was tested by the Range & Instrumentation Division of SUPARCO in synergy with the PAF. Three drones were successfully intercepted and shot down by the missile system following extensive testing.
- Crotale – With the procurement of the Spada 2000, Pakistan reportedly decommissioned most of its Crotale short-range air defence missile systems. However some modernised variants still remain in active service.
- HQ-9B – In October 2003, it was reported that China had closed a deal with Pakistan to supply an unspecified number of FT-2000 systems, an anti-radiation variant of the HQ-9 long-range air defence system. However, in March 2009, a report was published stating that Pakistan was not considering importing the missile. It was reported in mid-2008 that Pakistan intended to purchase a high altitude air-missile defence system and the FD-2000, another variant of HQ-9, was expected to be chosen. In 2023 PAF inducted the HQ-9B variant into service with a reported range of 260 km.
- AML HE 60-20 – A modified version of the French Panhard armoured vehicle equipped with a 20mm anti-aircraft cannon used primarily for on-base security. At least five were originally in service in the late 1990s.

=== Drone technology ===
On 7 September 2015, Pakistan became the fifth nation globally to develop and use an armed unmanned combat aerial vehicle (drone), the NESCOM Burraq. Pakistan first started exploring drone technology when it acquired Falco drones from Selex Galileo for approximately $40 million in 2008. Since then, Pakistan has been developing variants of the original Falco drone in the Pakistan Aeronautical Complex (PAC) in collaboration with the Italian firm. The Burraq was developed which was based on the Falco's technology. By March 2015, Pakistan was able to test-fire Burraq armed with an air-to-surface missile named Barq with pin-point precision. Burraq drones were used extensively to provide support to the Pakistan Army during Operation Zarb-e-Azb.

Pakistan has already talked with Turkey to manufacture parts for Anka UAV and possibly to produce the combat drones locally. Also the CAIG Wing Loong II UCAVs will be produced in Pakistan with collaboration with China.

== Modernisation and acquisitions ==
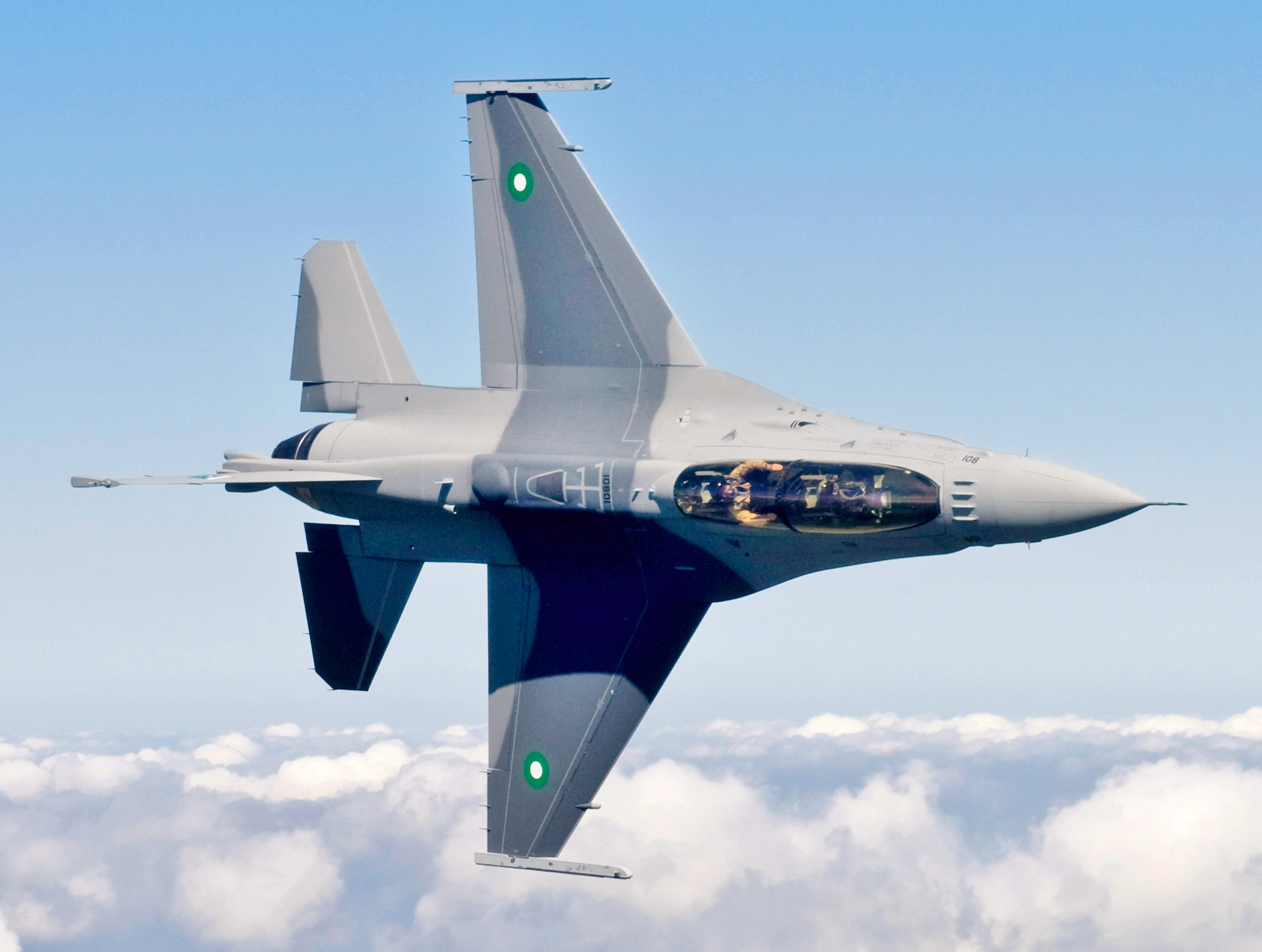
The first F-16D Block 52 fighter of the PAF, rolled out on 13 October 2009 after undergoing flight testing in the United States prior to delivery.

For a brief period, the Pakistan Air Force experienced a stall in modernisation efforts, however this ended in April 2006 when the Pakistani cabinet approved the PAF's proposals to procure new aircraft and systems from several sources, including modern combat aircraft from the United States and China. The AFFDP 2019 (Armed Forces Development Programme 2019) would oversee the extensive modernisation of the PAF from 2006 to 2019.

On 24 July 2008, the Bush administration informed the U.S. Congress that it planned to shift nearly $230 million of $300 million in aid from counter-terrorism programs to upgrading Pakistan's ageing F-16s. The administration had previously announced on 27 June 2008 that it was proposing to sell ITT Corporation's electronic warfare gear valued at up to $75 million to enhance Pakistan's existing inventory of F-16s. Pakistan has asked about buying as many as 21 AN/ALQ-211(V)9 Advanced Integrated Defensive Electronic Warfare Suite Pods (AIDEWS) as well as other related equipment. The proposed sale will ensure that the existing fleet is "compatible" with new F-16 Block 50/52 fighters being purchased by Islamabad.

After 9/11, the U.S. and Pakistan began discussing the release of the embargoed F-16s and Pakistan's ability to purchase new aircraft. Of the 28 F-16A/B built under the Peace Gate III/IV contracts and embargoed in 1990, 14 were delivered as EDA (Excess Defense Articles) from 2005 to 2008, two of which were delivered on 10 July 2007.

Between 2005 and 2008, 14 F-16A/B Block 15 OCU fighters were delivered to the PAF under renewed post-9/11 ties between the U.S. and Pakistan. These had originally been built for Pakistan under the Peace Gate III/IV contracts but were never delivered due to the subsequent U.S. arms embargo imposed on Pakistan in 1990.

To upgrade the F-16A/B fleet, 32 Falcon STAR kits were purchased for the original Peace Gate I aircraft and 35 Mid-Life Update (MLU) kits were ordered, with 11 more MLU kits optional. Four F-16A/B being upgraded in the U.S. to F-16AM/BM had an expected delivery date of December 2011. F-16A/B in the PAF's service were to be upgraded starting in October 2010 by Turkish Aerospace Industries, at a rate of one per month.

The Peace Drive I contract for 12 F-16C and six F-16D Block 52+ (Advanced Block 52) aircraft, powered by F100-PW-229 engines was signed on 30 September 2006. The first F-16 to be completed, an F-16D, was rolled out on 13 October 2009 and began flight testing immediately. The first batch of F-16C/D Block 52+, two F-16D and one F-16C landed at PAF Base Shahbaz, Jacobabad, on 26 June 2010. One more F-16C was received by 5 July 2010.

On 13 December 2008, the Government of Pakistan stated that two Indian Air Force aircraft were intercepted by the Pakistan Air Force a few kilometers inside Pakistani airspace. This charge is denied by the Indian government.

During talks with a delegation from the French Senate on 28 September 2009, Prime Minister Yousaf Raza Gillani stated that the PAF had used most of its stockpile of laser-guided munitions against militants in the Malakand and FATA regions and that replacements for such types of equipment were urgently required.

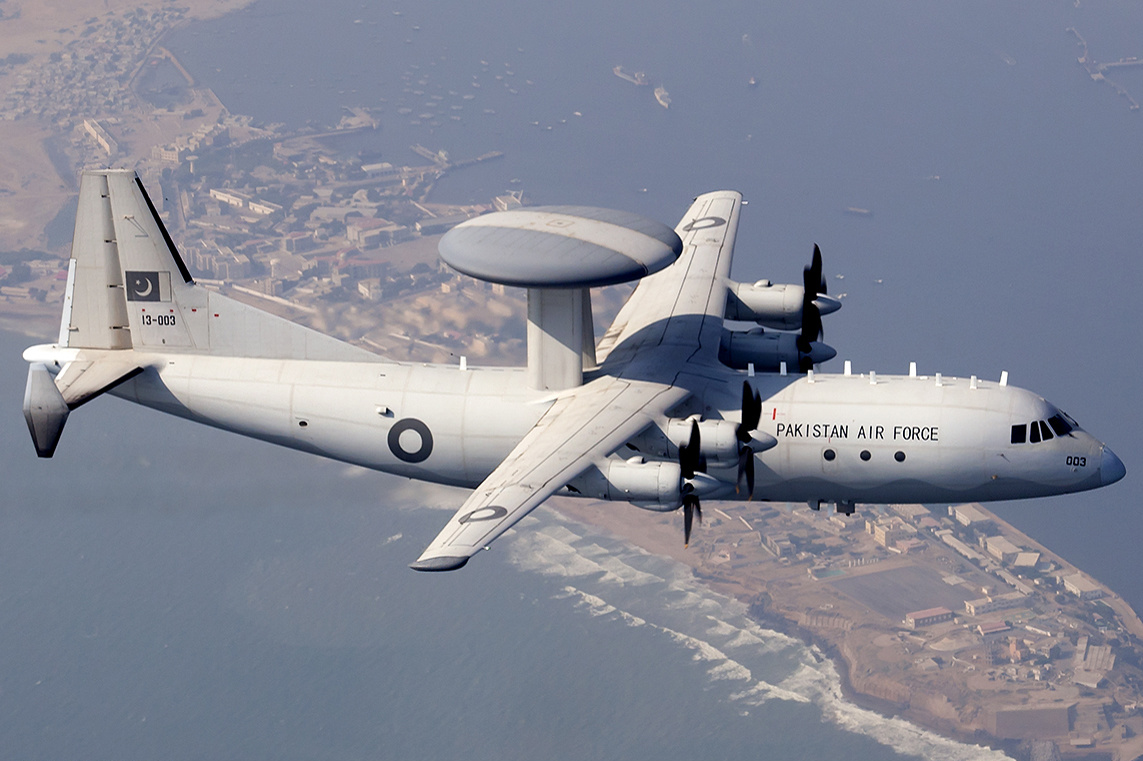
PAF ZDK-03 AEW&C in flight

In December 2009, Pakistan saw the delivery of the PAF's first Saab 2000 Erieye AEW&C from Sweden and an Il-78MP aerial refuelling tanker/military transport aircraft from Ukraine.

The PAF was reported to be considering purchasing the Chinese Hongdu L-15 advanced jet trainer to train pilots for high-tech fighters such as the Chengdu J-10. Extensive evaluations of the aircraft took place in Pakistan in December 2009.

According to Air Chief Marshal (ACM) Rao Qamar Suleman (then Chief of the Air Staff), the new fighters would eliminate the PAF's limitations in conducting precision night-time strike operations, as the existing capability was based on around 34 Dassault Mirage 5 fighters upgraded with new avionics for night-time precision strike missions under the Retrofit of Strike Element (ROSE) programme during 1999–2004. The SABIR (Special Airborne Mission Installation & Response System), a FLIR system that has Brite Star II and Star Safire III EO/IR sensors installed on a C-130 saw extensive usage during the Pakistani military's operations against militants in the FATA region.

In 2021, Pakistan agreed to buy 36 Chengdu J-10CP multirole fighter aircraft from China to counter the Dassault Rafale which India bought from France.

On 11 March 2022, PAF inducted modern J-10C fighter aircraft in its fleet, the formal ceremony was conducted at the Minhas Airbase Kamra.

At a ceremony in January 2024, Pakistan announced its intent to acquire the J-35 aircraft.

=== Planned acquisitions ===
Mass production of the PAC JF-17 Thunder A Block-3, a 4.5 generation aircraft, is underway to replace the F-16 as the "backbone" of the Pakistan Air Force's arsenal. After every 3–5 years, newer blocks of the aircraft are expected to be produced. Pakistan has been in extensive talks with China to acquire between 40 and 60 upgraded fifth-generation Shenyang J-35 stealth fighter aircraft. The TAI TF Kaan, another fifth-generation aircraft under development by Turkey (intended to operate with critical assets such as the American F-35 Lightning II) has also been a viable offer for Pakistan, as these fighters can greatly strengthen the PAF's fleet before the country's own fifth-generation fighter is developed under Project Azm. Pakistan is also reportedly working on developing a strong arsenal of UAVs alongside China's CAIG GJ-2 MALE-UCAV.

==== Project Azm ====
On 7 July 2017, the Pakistan Air Force announced the development of a fifth-generation fighter aircraft, a medium-altitude long-endurance unmanned aerial vehicle (MALE UAV) and munitions under the banner of Project Azm (Urdu for resolve/determination). Air Chief Marshal (ACM) Sohail Aman stated that the design phase for the MALE UAV was in its final stages.

== Military exercises ==
A PAF Mirage III of the No. 7 Bandits Squadron alongside a US Navy F-18 and F-16s of the USAF and RJAF

The Pakistan Air Force sent a contingent of six F-16 A/B fighters to the 2004 international Anatolian Eagle exercise in Turkey. In 2005, after around one year of planning, the PAF held the High Mark 2005 military exercise which lasted for one month and also involved the Pakistan Army and Pakistan Navy. The scenario saw two opposing forces, Blueland and Foxland, engaging in simulated combat which involved both offensive and defensive operations. It was stated that the exercise would consist of three stages and PAF aircraft would fly around 8200 sorties. The involvement of units from the Pakistan Army and Navy was aimed at providing more realistic operational scenarios. High Mark 2005 followed the Tempest-1 military exercise which was focused purely on air power but differed in terms of the duration, intensity and complexity of all air operations being conducted.

In 2008, the Turkish Air Force sent five F-16C/D fighters and 50 personnel from 191 Cobras Squadron to Pakistan to take part in the joint Indus Viper exercise at PAF Base Mushaf.

In the summer of 2005, a PAF team of 20 airmen, including pilots, navigators, engineers, maintenance technicians and a C-130E was sent to the United States to take part in the AMC (Air Mobility Command) Rodeo. The PAF again took part in the AMC Rodeo two years later, in July 2007.

In 2009, while undertaking combat operations against militants in the FATA and Swat regions, the PAF initiated the Saffron Bandit exercise with the aim of training the PAF's entire combat force to undertake such anti-terrorist operations.

In December 2009, the PAF sent six Chengdu F-7PG fighters of No. 31 Wing based at PAF Base Samungli to the United Arab Emirates to take part in the Air Tactics Leadership Course (ATLC)—also known as Exercise Iron Falcon—at Al Dhafra Air Base.

The PAF's High Mark 2010 exercise was launched on 15 March 2010, the first time a High Mark exercise had been conducted since 2005, after all PAF received their Air Tasking Orders (ATO). The country-wide exercise involved units based all over Pakistan, from Skardu to the Arabian Sea, at all Main Operating Bases and Forward Operating Bases. Joint operations involving the Pakistan Army and Pakistan Navy were also conducted, aiming to test and improve integration and co-operation between the three branches of the Pakistan Armed Forces. Operations emphasised a near-realistic simulation of a wartime environment, exposure of PAF aircrews to contemporary concepts of air combat, new employment concepts and joint operations between the Pakistan Air Force, Army and Navy. New inductions such as the JF-17 Thunder, Saab 2000 Erieye AEW&C and Il-78 MRTT also saw service in this exercise. On 6 April 2010, the end of the first phase of exercise High Mark 2010 was celebrated with a 90-minute firepower demonstration at the PAF's firing range facility in the deserts of Thal. The H-2 SOW was also shown to the public for the first time, being launched from around 60 km away before hitting its target, and a mock counter-insurgency operation was performed by participating forces. The demo heralded the beginning of High Mark 2010's second phase, where the PAF would practice joint operations with the Pakistan Army during its own exercise Azm-e-Nau-3 (New Resolve 3). During High Mark 2010, a Chengdu F-7 and Mirage 5 fighter practiced landing, refuelling and take-off operations from a motorway. It was reported that the PAF is in negotiations with the Ministry of Communications to set up any required facilities for PAF operations on various motorways in Pakistan.

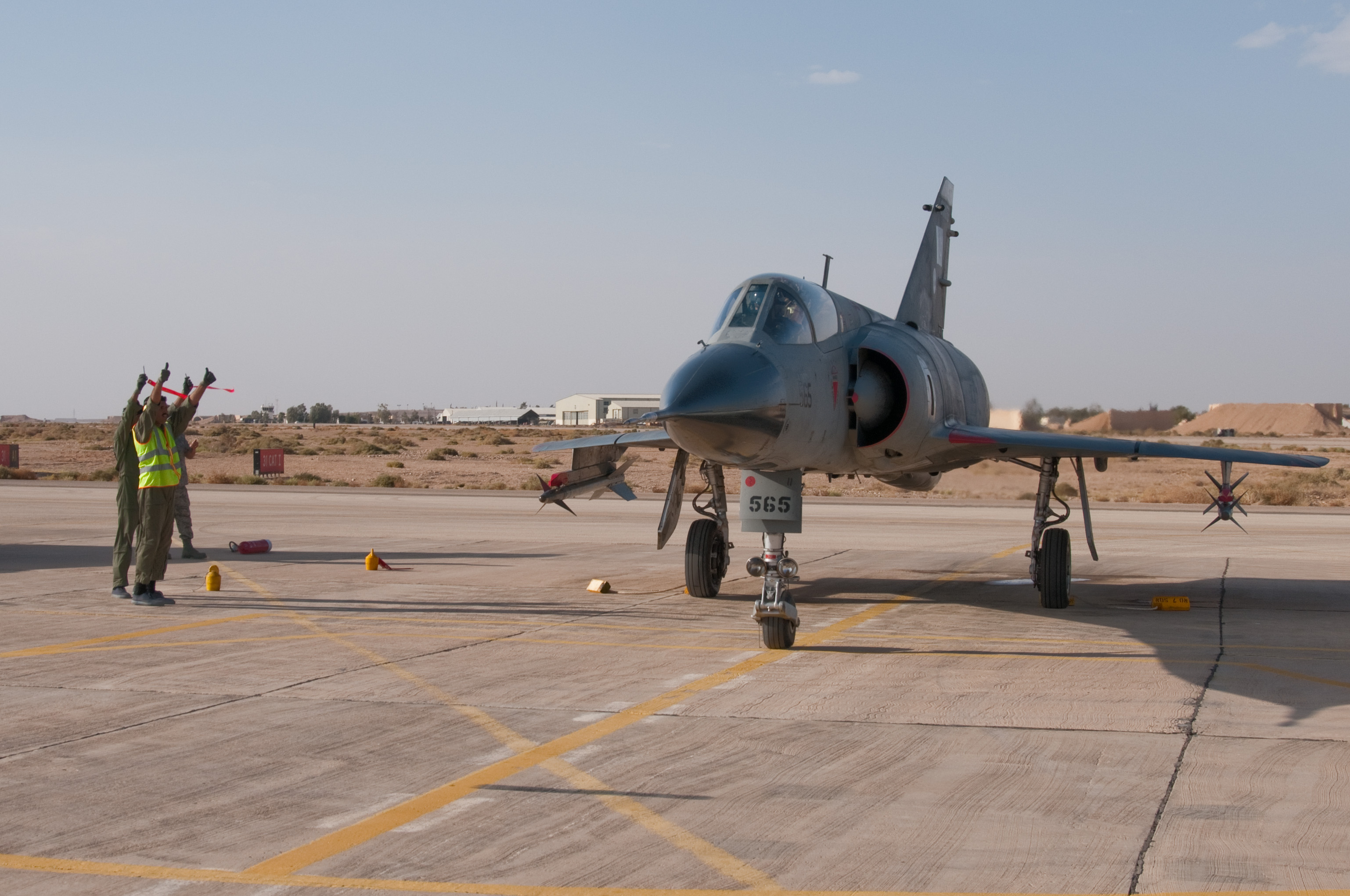
A PAF Mirage III competes in the Alert Scramble Competition during the 2010 Falcon Air Meet in Jordan.

In July 2010, the PAF sent six F-16B fighters of No. 9 Griffins Squadron and 100 PAF personnel to Nellis Air Force Base in the U.S. to participate in the international Red Flag exercise for the first time. During the exercise, the PAF pilots practiced in-flight refuelling with their F-16s using the Boeing KC-135 Stratotanker.

External videos
- Mirage III ROSE fighters of the PAF's No. 7 Bandits Squadron take part in the Falcon Air Meet 2010 exercise.

In October 2010, the PAF's No. 7 Bandits Squadron sent a team of its Dassault Mirage III ROSE fighters to Jordan to participate in the Falcon Air Meet 2010 exercise at the Azraq Royal Jordanian Air Base. January 2011 saw a PAF contingent of F-16A/B and Dassault Mirage fighters take part in the Al-Saqoor II exercise in Saudi Arabia with the Royal Saudi Air Force.

In March 2011, a joint Sino-Pakistani exercise, codenamed Shaheen-1, was conducted involving a contingent of Chinese aircraft and personnel from the PLAAF. Information on which aircraft were used by each side in the exercise remained classified, but photos of Pakistani pilots inspecting what appeared to be Chinese Shenyang J-11B fighters were released on the internet. The exercise lasted for around four weeks and was the first time the PLAAF had deployed to Pakistan and conducted "operational" aerial maneuvers with the PAF.

== Involvement in Pakistani society ==
The Pakistan Air Force, alongside other branches of the armed forces has played an integral part in the civil society of Pakistan since its inception. In 1996, General Jehangir Karamat described the Pakistani military's relations with Pakistan's populace:

In my opinion, if we have to repeat of past events then we must understand that military leaders can pressure only up to a point. Beyond that their own position starts getting undermined because the military is after all is a mirror image of the civil society from which it is drawn.

— General Jehangir Karamat on civil society–military relations,

In times of natural disaster such as the chaotic floods of 1992 or the October 2005 earthquake, PAF engineers, medical and logistics personnel alongside the rest of the armed forces played a major role in bringing relief aid and supplies to those who were affected.

In addition to the PAF's involvement in relief activities at home, it has also helped the Pakistani military's responses to natural disasters in many other countries globally. The PAF was involved in the dispatching of relief to Indonesia, Bangladesh and Sri Lanka after they were hit by the 2004 Indian Ocean earthquake and tsunami. Coordinating a synergized response, the Pakistan Armed Forces sent ships and helicopters with aid and personnel to assist in the international relief operation.

== In popular culture ==
In Pakistani literature, the shaheen falcon has a special association with the poetry of the country's national poet, Allama Muhammad Iqbal. The bird also appears on the official representative badge of the Pakistan Air Force.

Various Urdu-language drama serials on the PAF have been written, produced, directed, and televised nationwide. Notable Urdu drama serials and films involving the PAF are Shahpar and Sherdil, which were televised on PTV and ARY Digital, respectively.

== Notable personnel ==
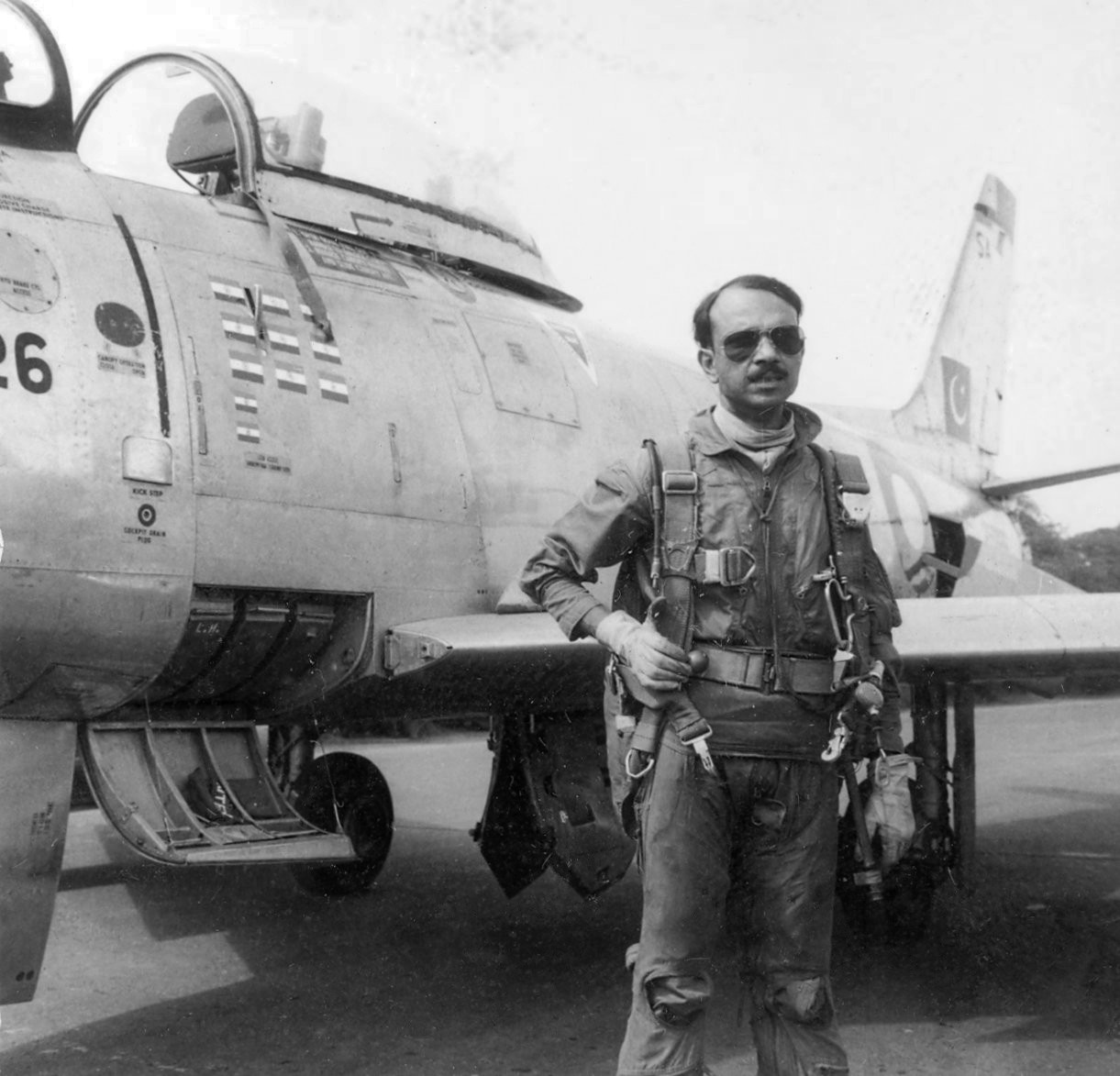
M.M. Alam, aka Little Dragon, Indian kill marks visible on his Sabre

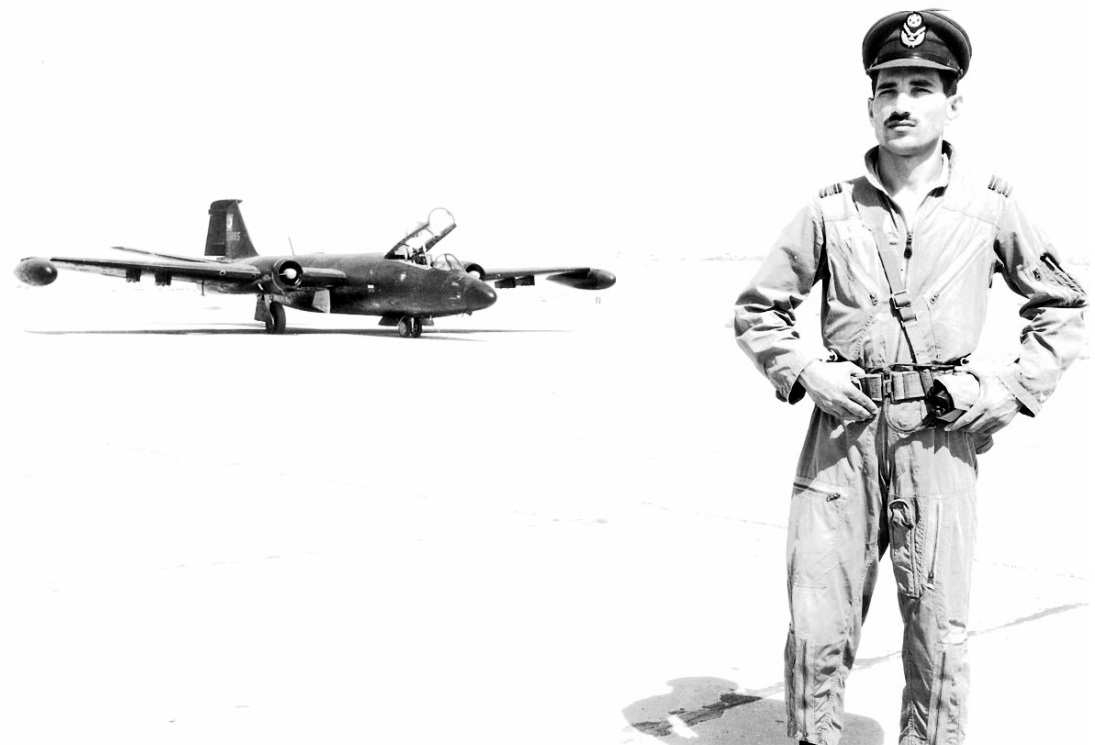
Squadron Leader Najeeb Ahmed Khan aka 8-Pass Charlie

The Nishan-e-Haider (Urdu: نشان حیدر, lit. 'Mark of Ali'), is the highest military award of Pakistan, and is roughly equivalent in value to the United States' Medal of Honor. Pilot Officer Rashid Minhas (1951 – 20 August 1971) is the only officer of the PAF to have been awarded the Nishan-e-Haider for sacrificing his life to save an aircraft from being hijacked to India.

Other notable recipients of major military awards include:

- Air Commodore Muhammad Mahmood Alam – awarded for downing nine fighters (of which five were downed within one minute) of the Indian Air Force in direct air-to-air combat. (Sitara-e-Jurat)
- Air Commodore Najeeb Ahmed Khan – B-57 Canberra bomber pilot who raided the Adampur Airbase several times during the 1965 war. (Sitara-e-Jurat)
- Squadron Leader Sarfaraz Ahmed Rafiqui – awarded for refusing to abandon his group of fighters during a battle despite his guns being jammed. He continued his attempts to assist his squadron in the battle by chasing enemy fighters until eventually being shot down. (Hilal-e-Jurat, Sitara-e-Jurat)
- Air Marshall Nur Khan – awarded for personally leading several operational missions that uplifted morale and enabled the air force to assert control over a larger and better-equipped enemy. (Hilal-e-Jurat)

== See also ==
- Air Force Strategic Command
- List of Pakistan Air Force bases
- List of Pakistan Air Force squadrons
- List of retired Pakistan Air Force aircraft
- Special Services Wing – (SSW)
- Pakistan Air Force Museum
- Pakistan Aeronautical Complex
