= Waziristan campaign =

Waziristan campaign (or Waziristan expedition, Waziristan war, etc.) may refer to:

- Waziristan campaign (1894–1895)
- Waziristan campaign (1919–1920)
- Waziristan campaign (1921–1924)
- Waziristan campaign (1936–1939)
- Waziristan rebellion (1948–1954)
- Insurgency in Khyber Pakhtunkhwa, the 2004–present conflict in North-West Pakistan
