= Rangin Dadfar Spanta =

Afghan politician (born 1953)

رنگین دادفر سپنتا Dr. Rangin Dadfar Spanta
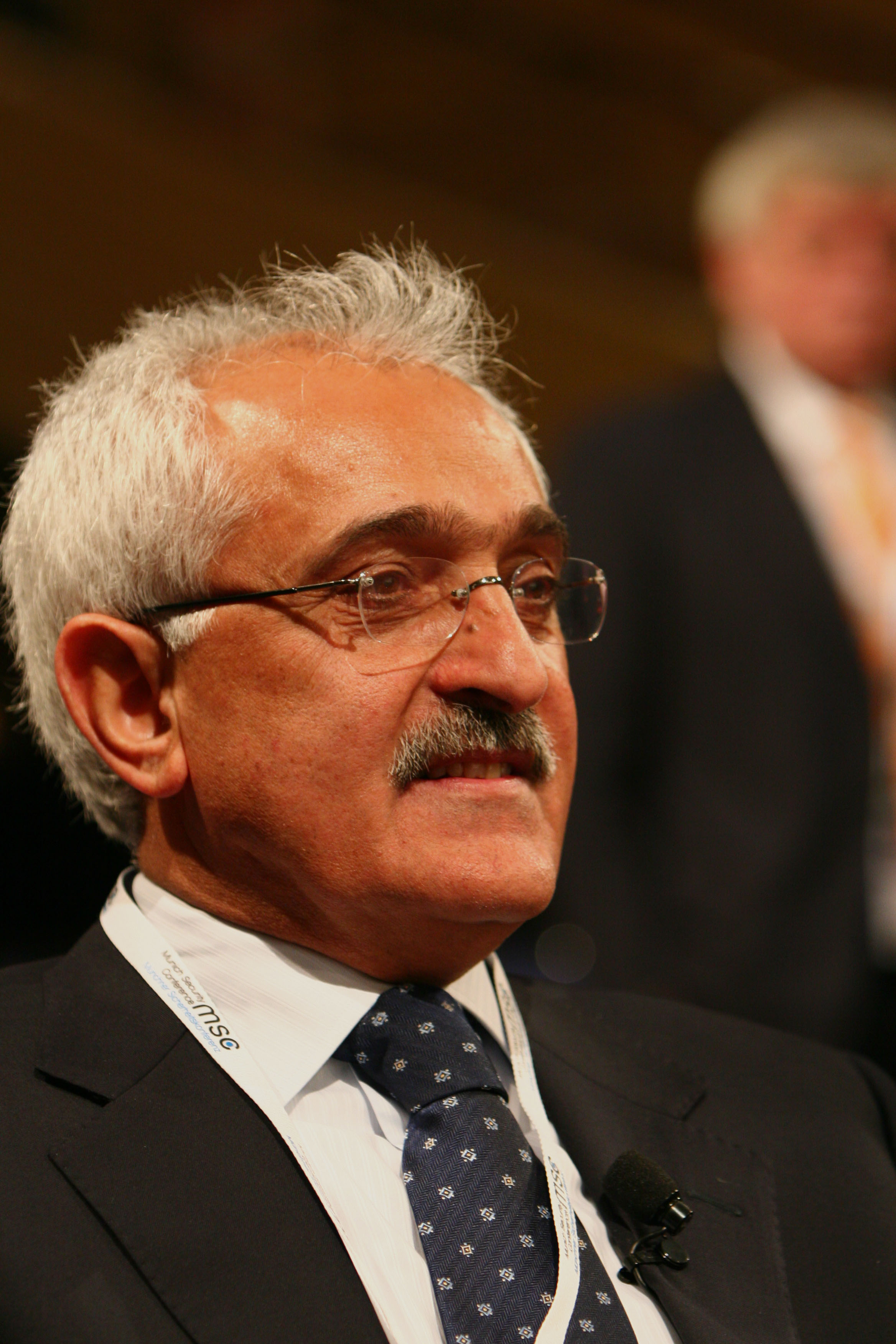
- Dr. Spanta as Senior Advisor to the President for International Affairs at the 46th Munich Security Conference in Germany (2010)

Foreign Minister of Afghanistan
- In office April 20, 2006 – January 18, 2010
- President: Hamid Karzai
- Preceded by: Abdullah Abdullah
- Succeeded by: Zalmai Rassoul

Personal details
- Born: December 15, 1953 (age 72) Karukh District, Herat Province, Kingdom of Afghanistan
- Education: Kabul University; Ankara University; RWTH Aachen University

Dr. Rangin Dadfar Spanta (born December 15, 1953) is a politician in Afghanistan who last served as National Security Advisor of President Hamid Karzai. Prior to that he served as Foreign Minister from April 2006 to January 2010.

He was appointed to that position by President Karzai during a cabinet reshuffle on March 21, 2006, and approved by the 249-seat lower house on April 20, 2006. He was previously the Senior Advisor on International Affairs to President Hamid Karzai. On January 18, 2010, Zalmai Rassoul became the Foreign Minister of Afghanistan.

== Early years ==
Spanta was born on 15 December 1953 in Karukh, Herat Province, where he completed his primary and secondary education. Spanta is fluent in Dari Persian, Pashto, Turkish, German and English.

Spanta was an ex-patriate for many years as he fled during the Soviet–Afghan War to Turkey, where he received his master's degree from the Faculty of Political Science of Ankara University. Some years later, he moved to Germany claiming to be a refugee in 1982. In Germany he became a scholar and assistant professor of political science at RWTH Aachen University, Germany, at which time he also served as spokesperson for the Alliance for Democracy in Afghanistan, was active in the local section of the German Green Party and being employed by a local NGO Eine Welt Forum Aachen e.V. During his visits to Afghanistan, upon the fall of the Taliban, he taught briefly at the Kabul University while still being resident in Germany.

== Afghan politician ==
He returned in January 2005 and served as advisor of internationally affairs to Hamid Karzai.

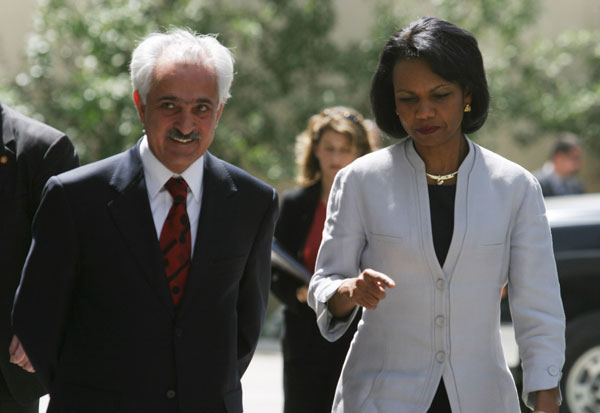
Rangin Dadfar Spanta with United States Secretary of State Condoleezza Rice in June 2006.

On May 10, 2007, the Wolesi Jirga, the lower house of the bicameral National Assembly of Afghanistan, attempted a vote of no-confidence against Spanta in connection with the plight of Afghan refugees. The effort failed by one vote, but two days later the Wolesi Jirga did succeed in stripping him of his minister status. On June 3, 2007, the Supreme Court of Afghanistan, acting on a request by President Hamid Karzai, declared the second vote illegal and restored Spanta's status as minister. A significant dispute about this issue remains between the Wolesi Jirga and Karzai.

When Karzai presented his list of minister candidates for the new government after the presidential election in 2009, he announced that he would decide on Spanta's post after the International conference on Afghanistan in London on January 28, 2010. On January 9, 2010, when president Karzai presented his second list of candidates to the Wolesi Jirga, he proposed to replace Spanta by the former security advisor Rassoul. Suddenly on January 18, 2010, Mr Rassoul was nominated and accepted by the Kabul parliament as the new foreign minister.

Spanta was one of Karzai's ministers that did not have a reputation for corruption or incompetence, but he could not boast popularity or enjoy tribal followings.

In January 2010, president Karzai decided to replace Spanta after the International Conference on Afghanistan in London by Zalmai Rassoul. At the London conference, Spanta still represented Afghanistan. Shortly before, he visited the Afghanistan Congress of the German SPD in Berlin, where he referred to his background as a peace activist during his time in Germany.

== Assassination of Dr. Spanta's brother ==
On July 17, 2013, Spanta's brother Ahmad Wali Tahiri, was assassinated by unknown gunmen in Karukh district of western Herat province. Tahiri used to serve as administrative employee of Karukh attorney general for the past seven years.

At the funeral, Spanta revealed that two weeks earlier the Taliban had sent him a threat message notifying that the group is planning to kill his brother. "The foreign elements are training and hiding some people in Peshawar and Quetta. After the training, they are sent on terror missions during which they kill our brothers, sisters and relatives," said Spanta.

== Book ==
In 2017, Spanta published a memoir called 'Afghanistan Politics: A Narrative From Within' in Persian. The book included reflection on President Hamid Karzai's administration.

== See also ==
- Waziristan campaign (disambiguation)
- Waziristan accord
