= 1949 Mughalgai raid =

1949 Pakistani airstrike in Afghanistan

- Part of the Waziristan rebellion of 1948-1954, Pashtunistan conflict and Pakistan-Afghanistan skirmishes
Date	June 1949
Location	Mughalgai, Paktika, Kingdom of Afghanistan
Result	See #Aftermath

Belligerents
Pashtun Separatists; Afghanistan	Pakistan

Commanders and leaders
Mirza Ali Khan Wazir	(Pakistan) Richard Atcherley

Units involved
Pashtun Rebels	Royal Pakistani Air Force; (no border) No. 14 Squadron PAF

Strength
Unknown	Warplanes

Casualties and losses
23 killed	None

The 1949 Mughalgai raid occurred when a Pakistan Air Force warplane belonging to No. 14 Squadron PAF bombed a militant camp in the village of Mughalgai on the Afghan side of the Waziristan border while chasing forces loyal to the self declared separatist government of the Pashtunistan led by the Faqir of Ipi who attacked Pakistani military border posts from within Afghan territory. This airstrike killed 23 people and further fueled Afghan support for Pashtunistan.

== Background ==
In September 1947, when Pakistan was admitted into United Nations, Afghanistan became the only country which voted against Pakistan’s membership of United Nations and in an open act of hostility against Pakistan, the flag of Pashtunistan was raised alongside the flag of Afghanistan in the Afghan capital of Kabul. Afghanistan initiated the arming and financing of proxies in the border regions of Waziristan and Khyber, namely Afridi Sarishtas and Ipi Faqir, under the banner of 'Liberation of Pashtunistan'. Consequently, numerous skirmishes erupted between Pakistani security forces and Afghan-backed proxies.

== Aftermath ==
A tribal council was held by Afghan government in the capital Kabul which declared all treaties related to Durand Line as null and void and thus declared full support for Pashtunistan. This was accompanied by further financial and military aid to separatists including the establishment of an arms factory.

On 31 August, 'Pashtunistan Day' was designated, an occasion consistently observed by the Afghan government. Proxies supported by Afghanistan declared the establishment of 'Pashtunistan' in Tirah (Khyber) and Razmak (Waziristan), appointing Faqir of Ipi as President of the Pashtunistan national assembly.

== See also ==
- Waziristan campaign (1919–1920)
- Waziristan campaign (1936–1939)
- Waziristan rebellion of 1948-1954
- Bajaur Campaign
- Pakistan-Afghanistan skirmishes
- Pashtunistan
- Faqir of Ipi
