= Waziristan campaign (1921–1924) =

British military campaign

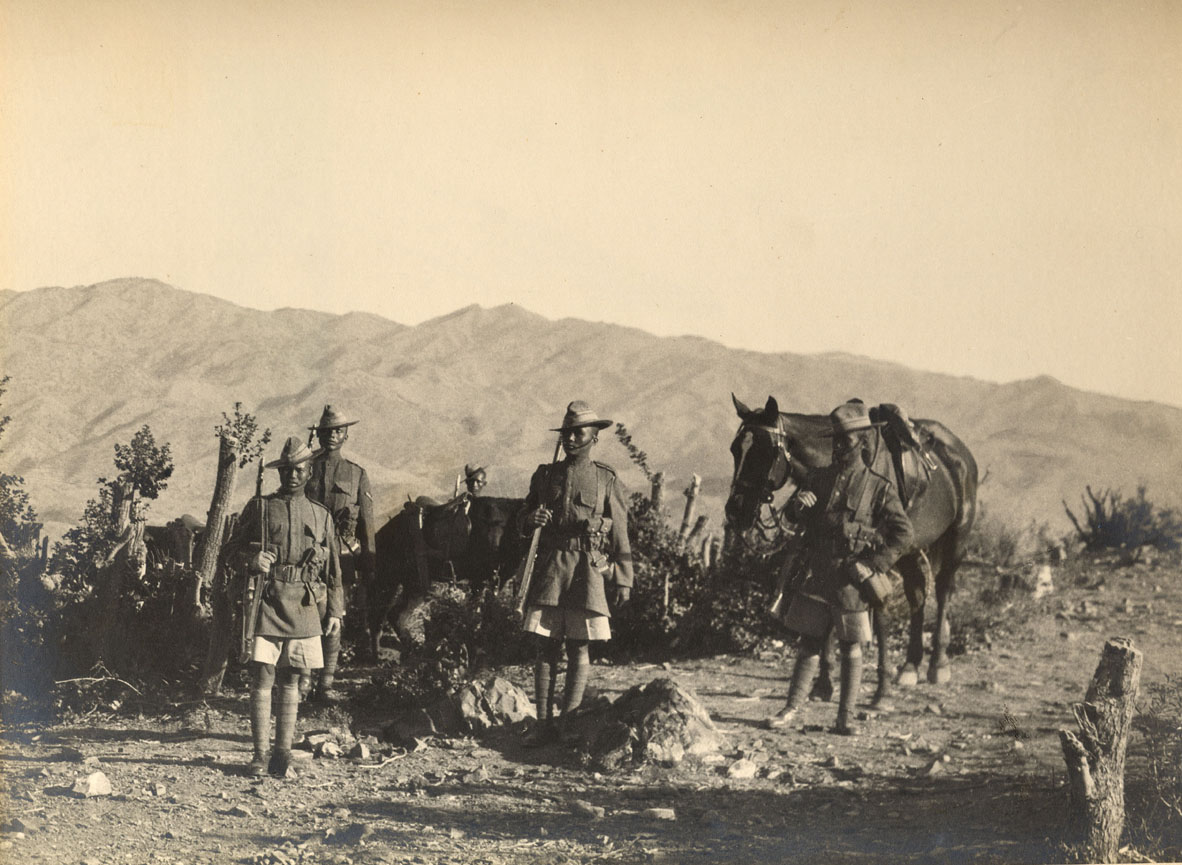
The 5th Royal Gurkha Rifles in Waziristan, 1923.

The Waziristan campaign was a road construction effort and military campaign conducted from 21 December 1921 to 31 March 1924 by British and Indian forces in Waziristan (in what is now Pakistan). These operations were part of the new Forward Policy, which sought to reduce and eventually eliminate tribal uprisings and tribal raids into settled districts by stationing inside Waziristan regular troops, which would then be capable of swiftly responding to Waziri rebellions. The rebel tribes attempted to harass the British troops, but were unsuccessful in stopping the British road construction efforts. Hugh Beattie provided a detailed account of the conflict in chapter 7 of Empire and Tribe in the Afghan Frontier Region: Custom, Conflict and British Strategy in Waziristan until 1947.

== See also ==
- First Anglo-Afghan War
- Second Anglo-Afghan War
- Third Anglo-Afghan War
- Invasions of Afghanistan
- Waziristan campaign (1919–1920)
- Waziristan campaign (1936–1939)
- Pink's War
- Waziristan rebellion (1948-1954)
- Pakistan-Afghanistan border skirmishes
- North-West Frontier (military history)
