= Waziristan rebellion (1948–1954) =

Rebellion by Faqir of Ipi to secede from Pakistan

- Part of the Pashtunistan conflict and Pakistan-Afghanistan skirmishes
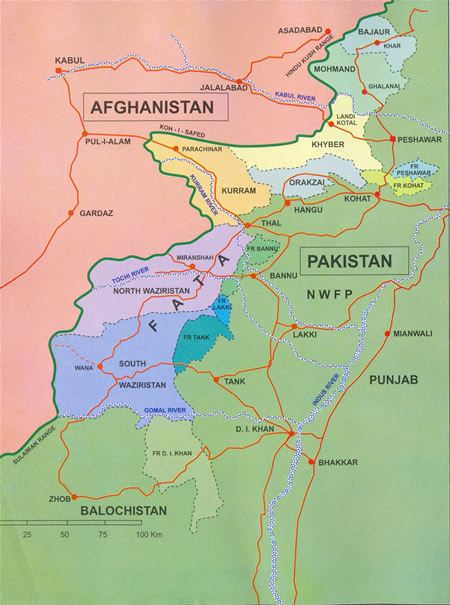
- North (purple) and South (blue) Waziristan and surrounding Federally Administered Tribal Areas and provinces
Location	Waziristan, Federally Administered Tribal Areas
Result	Pakistani victory: Failure to foment an extensive uprising; End of Insurrection
Territorial changes	Datta Khel area of Waziristan recaptured by Pakistan

Belligerents
Waziristan; Supported by: Afghanistan	Pakistan

Commanders and leaders
Faqir of Ipi; Mehar Dil (surrendered)	(Pakistan) Liaqat Ali Khan; Ayub Khan; Leslie William

Units involved
Waziristani rebels; Faqir of Ipi's forces; Afghan/Pakistani Pashtun tribesmen; Pashtun nationalist Pashtun tribesmen; Pro-Pashtunistan Pashtun tribesmen	Pakistan Army; Gilgit Scouts; Frontier Corps; Pakistan Air Force; 14th PAF squadron; ISI; Covert Action Division

Strength
Unknown	40,000+

Casualties and losses
Military Compound destroyed; Several killed	Low

Waziristan rebellion was a rebellion by the Pashtun leader Faqir of Ipi to secede from Pakistan and establish a separate Pashtun state of Pashtunistan.

== Historical background ==
=== Anglo-Afghan wars ===
==== First Anglo-Afghan War ====
British East India Company defeated the Sikhs during the Second Anglo-Sikh War in 1849, and incorporated small parts of the region into the Province of Punjab. While Peshawar was the site of a small revolt against the British during the Mutiny of 1857, local Pashtun tribes throughout the region generally remained neutral or supportive of the British as they detested the Sikhs.

In 1837, Lord Palmerston and John Hobhouse, fearing the instability of Afghanistan, the Sindh, and the increasing power of the Sikh kingdom to the northwest, raised the spectre of a possible Russian invasion of British India through Afghanistan. The British tended to misunderstand the foreign policy of the Emperor Nicholas I as anti-British and intent upon an expansionary policy in Asia. The main goal of Nicholas's foreign policy was not the conquest of Asia, but rather upholding the status quo in Europe, especially by co-operating with Prussia and Austria, and in isolating France, as Louis Philippe I, the King of the French was a man whom Nicholas hated as a "usurper".

Therefore, instead of fixating on the oriental other, the East India Company played up the threat of the Russian bear". British fears of a Persian and Afghan invasion of India took one step closer to becoming a reality when negotiations between the Afghans and Russians broke down in 1838. The Qajar dynasty of Persia, with Russian support, attempted the Siege of Herat. Herat, in Afghanistan, is a city that had historically belonged to Persia; the Qajar shahs had long desired to take it back. It is located in a plain so fertile that it is known as the "Granary of Central Asia"; whoever controls Herat and the surrounding countryside also controls the largest source of grain in all of Central Asia.

On 1 October 1838, Lord Auckland issued the Simla Declaration attacking Dost Mohammed Khan for making "an unprovoked attack" on the empire of "our ancient ally, Maharaja Ranjeet Singh", going on to declare that Shuja Shah was "popular throughout Afghanistan" and would enter his former realm "surrounded by his own troops and be supported against foreign interference and factious opposition by the British Army". The British denied that they were invading Afghanistan, claiming they were merely supporting its "legitimate" Shuja government "against foreign interference and factious opposition." Shuja Shah by 1838 was barely remembered by most of his former subjects and those that did viewed him as a cruel, tyrannical ruler who, as the British were soon to learn, had almost no popular support in Afghanistan.

This ultimately resulted in the First Anglo-Afghan War which resulted in the Emirate of Afghanistan emerging victor and caused heavy losses to the British and British East India Company caused retreat from Kabul.

==== Second Anglo-Afghan War ====
After tension between Russia and Britain in Europe ended with the June 1878 Congress of Berlin, Russia turned its attention to Central Asia. That same summer, Russia sent an uninvited diplomatic mission to Kabul. Sher Ali Khan, the Amir of Afghanistan, tried unsuccessfully to keep them out. Russian envoys arrived in Kabul on 22 July 1878, and on 14 August, the British demanded that Sher Ali accept a British mission too. The Amir not only refused to receive a British mission under Neville Bowles Chamberlain, but threatened to stop it if it were dispatched. Lord Lytton, the viceroy of India, ordered a diplomatic mission to set out for Kabul in September 1878 but the mission was turned back as it approached the eastern entrance of the Khyber Pass, triggering the Second Anglo–Afghan War.

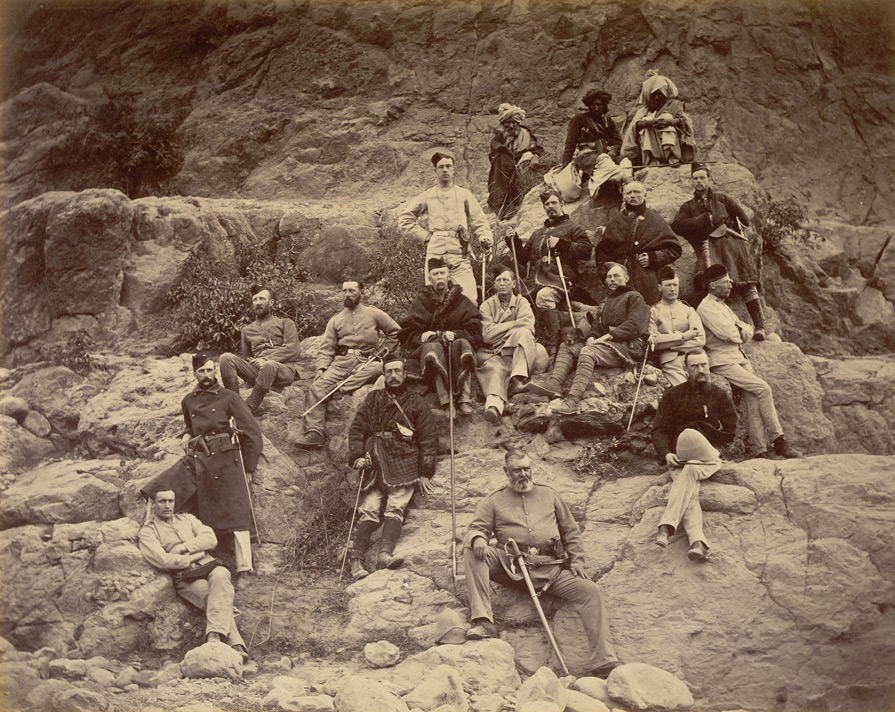
British team at the site of the Battle of Ali Masjid

With British forces occupying Kabul, Sher Ali's son and successor, Yaqub Khan, signed the Treaty of Gandamak on 26 May 1879. According to this agreement and in return for an annual subsidy and vague assurances of assistance in case of foreign aggression, Yaqub relinquished control of Afghan foreign affairs to Britain. British representatives were installed in Kabul and other locations, and their control was extended to the Khyber and Michni passes, and Afghanistan ceded various North-West Frontier Province areas and Quetta to Britain which included the strategic fort of Jamrud. Yaqub Khan also renounced all rights to interfering in the internal affairs of the Afridi tribe. In return, Yaqub Khan who only received an annual subsidy of 600,000 rupees, with the British pledging to withdraw all forces from Afghanistan excluding Kandahar. Ayub Khan, who had been serving as governor of Herat, rose in revolt, defeated a British detachment at the Battle of Maiwand in July 1880 and besieged Kandahar. Roberts then led the main British force from Kabul and decisively defeated Ayub Khan on 1 September at the Battle of Kandahar, bringing his rebellion to an end. Despite this, no further trouble resulted between Afghanistan and British India during Rahman's period of rule. The Russians kept well out of Afghan internal affairs, with the exception of the Panjdeh incident three years later, resolved by arbitration and negotiation after an initial British ultimatum.

The British ceded Kandahar to Afghanistan. The Districts of Quetta, Pishin, Sibi, Harnai & Thal Chotiali ceded to British India The war resulted in a British victory

In 1893, Mortimer Durand was dispatched to Kabul by British India to sign an agreement with Rahman for fixing the limits of their respective spheres of influence as well as improving diplomatic relations and trade. On November 12, 1893, the Durand Line Agreement was reached. This led to the creation of a new North-West Frontier Province.

==== Third Anglo-Afghan War and aftermath ====
Several princely states within the boundaries of the region were allowed to maintain their autonomy under the terms of maintaining friendly ties with the British. As the British war effort during World War One demanded the reallocation of resources from British India to the European war fronts, some tribesmen from Afghanistan crossed the Durand Line in 1917 to attack British posts in an attempt to gain territory and weaken the legitimacy of the border. The validity of the Durand Line, however, was re-affirmed in 1919 by the Afghan government with the signing of the Treaty of Rawalpindi, which ended the Third Anglo-Afghan War.

=== Operations in Waziristan (1919–1939) ===
==== Waziristan Campaign (1919–1920) ====
The prelude to the 1919–1920 campaign was an incursion by the Mahsud Tribe in the summer of 1917 while British forces were otherwise engaged fighting in the First World War. The British Forces eventually restored calm, however, in 1919 the Waziris took advantage of unrest in British India following the Third Anglo-Afghan War to launch more raids against British garrisons. It has been asserted that one of the reasons for these raids was that a rumour had been spread amongst the Wazirs and the Mahsuds, that Britain was going to give control of Waziristan to Afghanistan as part of the peace settlement following the Third Anglo-Afghan War. Buoyed by this prospect and sensing British weakness, the tribes were encouraged to launch a series of large scale raids in the administered areas. By November 1919, they had killed over 200 people and wounded a further 200.

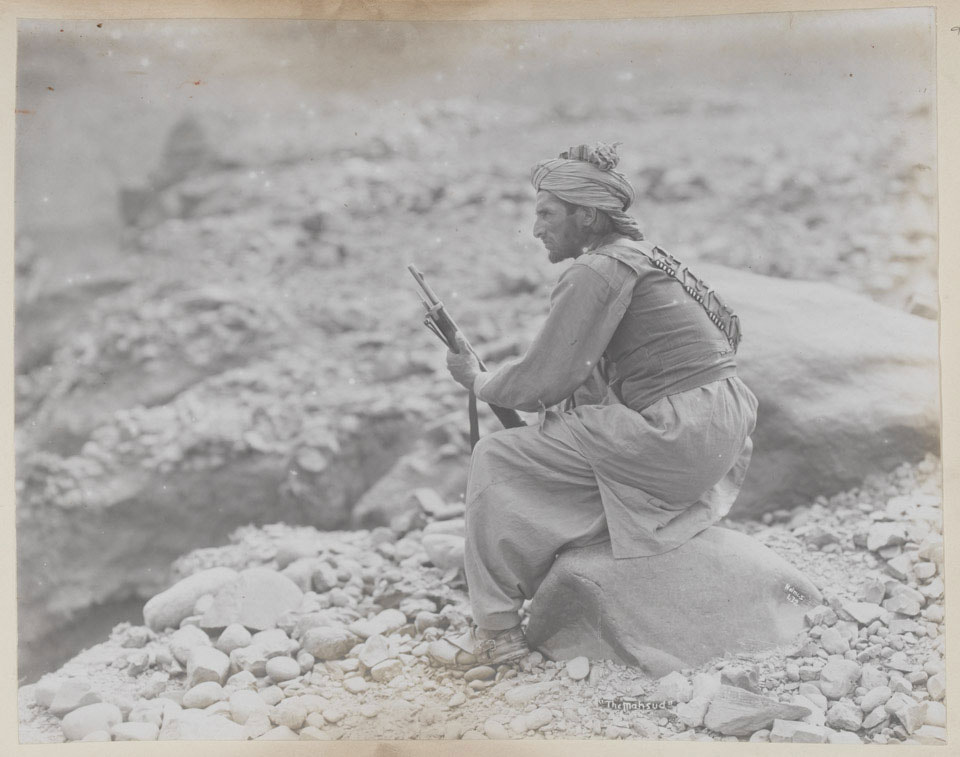
A Pashtun Tribesmen of Mehsud tribe, Waziristan, Circa 1919.

The Mahsuds took heavy casualties during the fighting at Ahnai Tangi and it was these casualties, as well as the destruction of their villages a month later by bombers of the Royal Air Force, that temporarily subdued the Mahsuds. When the Wana Wazirs rose up in November 1920, they appealed for help from the Mahsuds, but still recovering from their earlier defeat, no support was forthcoming and the Wazir opposition faded away. On 22 December 1920, Wana was re-occupied.

==== Waziristan Campaign (1921–1924) ====
The Waziristan Campaign was a road construction effort and military campaign conducted from 21 December 1921 to 31 March 1924 by British and Indian forces in Waziristan (in what is now Pakistan). These operations were part of the new Forward Policy, which sought to reduce and eventually eliminate tribal uprisings and tribal raids into settled districts by stationing regular troops inside Waziristan, which would then be capable of swiftly responding to Waziri rebellions. The rebel tribes attempted to harass the British troops, but were unsuccessful in stopping the British road construction efforts. Hugh Beattie provided a detailed account of the conflict in chapter 7 of Empire and Tribe in the Afghan Frontier Region: Custom, Conflict and British Strategy in Waziristan until 1947.

==== Pink's War (March–May 1925) ====
The defence of the North-West Frontier Province was an important task for British India. In the 1920s, the British were engaged in a continuing effort to defend British Indian Army bases against raids from Native Pashtun tribesmen in the province. In July 1924, the British mounted operations against several of the Mahsud tribes in southern Waziristan and by October most tribes had ceased their activities. Only the Abdur Rahman Khel tribe and three other supporting tribes continued to attack army posts.

On 1 May 1925, after just over 50 days of bombing, the tribal leaders sought peace to end the bombing, bringing the short campaign to a close. Only two British lives and one aircraft were lost during the campaign; Mahsud casualties are not known. Pink's War was the first air action of the RAF carried out independently of the British Army or Royal Navy.

==== Waziristan Campaign (1936–1939) ====
In 1919–1920, the British had fought a campaign against the Wazir tribes. Minor skirmishes had continued into 1921, but after the establishment of a permanent garrison at Razmak there had been a period of relative peace in the region. Throughout 1921–1924 the British undertook a road construction effort in the region that led to further conflict during the 1921–1924 campaign. In 1936, trouble again flared up in Waziristan in the form of a political and religious agitation by Mirzali Khan. For some time, there had been growing unrest in the region, fueled by a perception of a weakening of British resolve to govern following a number of constitutional changes in India; however, following a trial of a Muslim student on a charge of abducting a Hindu girl, Mirzali Khan began spreading anti-British sentiment in earnest, claiming that the government was interfering in a religious matter.

In late November 1936, in order to reassert the perception of control over the region, with the approval of the Tori Khel maliks, the

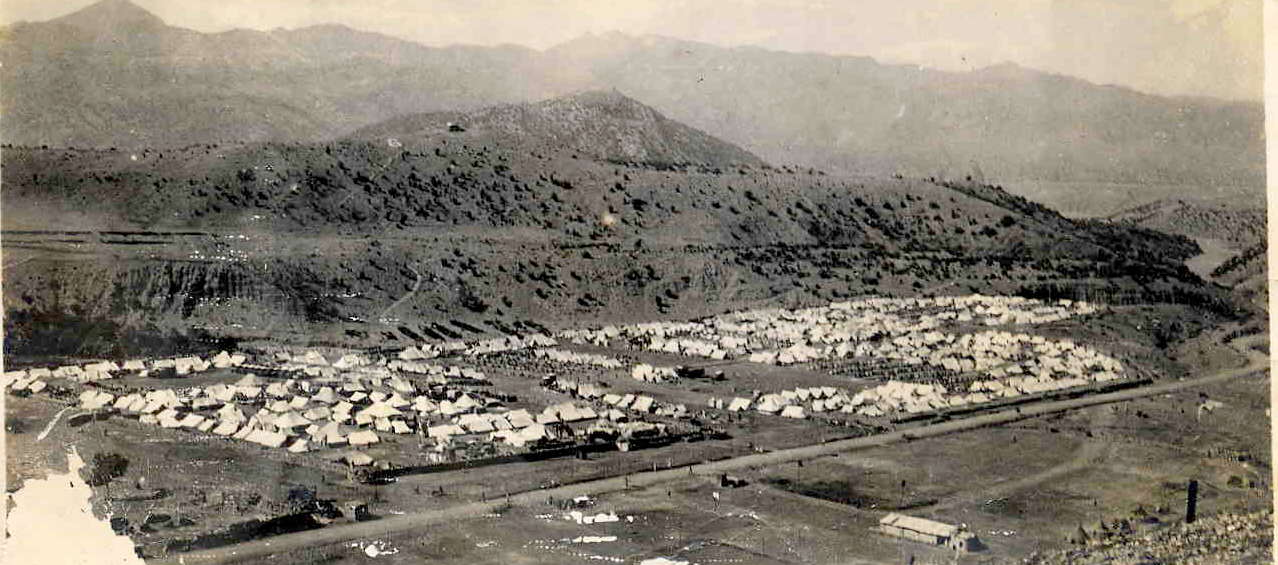
August 1938, Waziristan. Razani Military Camp. Taken from the Razmak side

government of India decided to move troops through the Khaisora Valley. This would be achieved by marching a column from the garrison at Razmak to the east, to join up at the village of Bichhe Kashkai with a column from the Bannu Brigade, which would advance from the south from Mirali. By this stage of British rule in India there were strict rules governing such expeditions on the North West Frontier, and as the purpose of the expedition was only as a demonstration to the tribesmen of government resolve, the decision was made that no offensive action was to be taken unless troops were fired upon.

The Razmak column, known as Razcol, began the march without incident, but after three days came under fire while traversing a narrow valley about 10 miles (16 km) short of Bichhe Kashkai. Intense fighting ensued as the column had to fight its way through to the village, while the two Indian battalions that made up Tocol from Mirali ran into even tougher opposition and were delayed until the following day. The supply situation was desperate and casualties numbered around 100, so it was decided to withdraw both columns back to Mirali. This was achieved, but the picquets and rearguard were heavily engaged on numerous occasions before they arrived.

While the British attempted to stamp out the insurrection by drawing the tribesmen into decisive engagement, Mirzali Khan remained at large (and indeed was never caught), and on the main, the tribesmen managed to avoid being drawn into battle using guerrilla tactics of ambush in order to keep the initiative. In doing so, they inflicted considerable casualties upon the British and Indian troops. An example of this occurred in April 1937, when a convoy from Wanna was ambushed in the Shahur Tangi defile. Using captured mountain guns and modern rifles, the vehicles were destroyed and the exits blocked, and in the ensuing battle seven officers and 45 men were killed, while another 47 were wounded. The tribesmen did not have everything their way, however, as the British began quartering the troubled areas and destroying hostile villages with both air and ground forces. These forces included five batteries of mechanised field artillery, two companies of Mk II and Mk IIb Light Tanks and six squadrons of aircraft including Hawker Harts, Westland Wapitis and Hawker Audaxs.

By December 1937, the Mirzali Khan's support began to wane and following this, the decision was made to withdraw most of the additional brigades that had been brought up to bolster the garrisons at Razmak, Bannu and Wanna as it was decided that their presence would only serve to inflame the situation. After 1939, the North West Frontier quieted down, and remained reasonably peaceful. Apart from the occasional raid on a village or attack on a garrison, things would remain this way until the end of British rule in 1947 when another rebellion was launched against the state of Pakistan.

== Prelude ==
=== Durand Line § independence ===
During British rule in India in 1893, Mortimer Durand drew the Durand Line, fixing the limits of the spheres of influence between the Emirate of Afghanistan and British India during the Great Game and leaving about half of historical Pashtun territory under British colonial rule; after the partition of India, the Durand Line now forms the internationally recognized border between Afghanistan and Pakistan.

In 1946, the Labour government in Britain, exhausted by recent events such as World War II and numerous riots, realized that it had neither

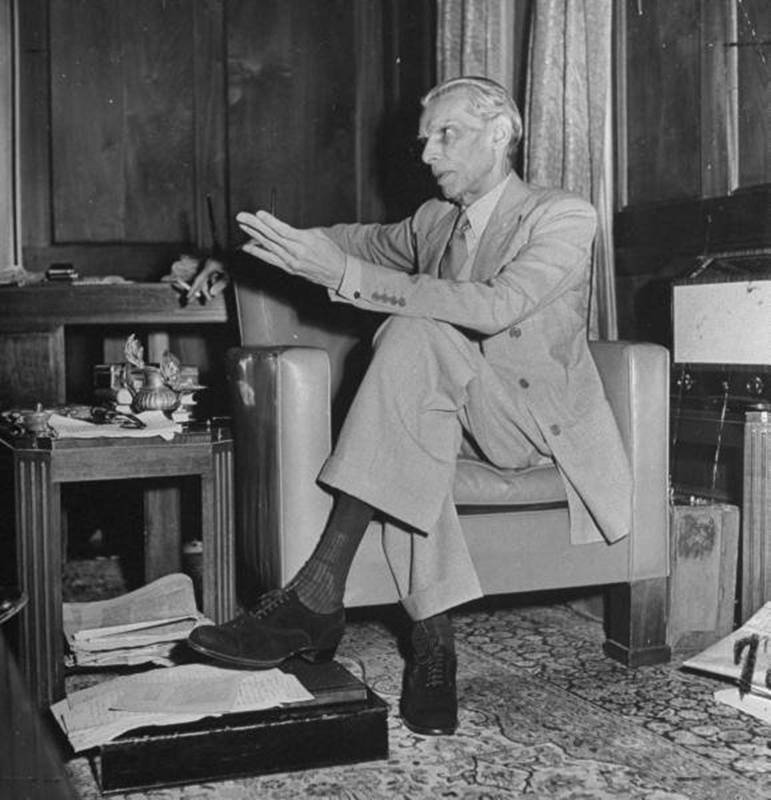
Muhammad Ali Jinnah, 1st Governor General of Pakistan

the mandate at home, the support internationally, nor the reliability of the British Indian Army for continuing to control an increasingly restless British India. The reliability of the native forces for continuing their control over an increasingly rebellious India diminished, and so the government decided to end the British rule of the Indian Subcontinent. In 1946, the Indian National Congress, being a secular party, demanded a single state. The All India Muslim League, who disagreed with the idea of single state, stressed the idea of a separate Pakistan as an alternative. On 14 August 1947, the new Dominion of Pakistan became independent and Muhammad Ali Jinnah was sworn in as its first governor general in Karachi. Independence was marked with widespread celebration, but the atmosphere remained heated given the communal riots prevalent during independence in 1947.

In the frontier tribal zone, the element of decolonization raised more concerns than it answered, as it did in many other parts of the subcontinent. The tribal zone was technically attributed to Pakistan due to vague assurances, but it was unclear who would be in charge of the area's defense as well as its future political and economic growth. Some Pashtun chiefs, like Ghaffar Khan in the NWFP and the Faqir of Ipi in the tribal region, continued to oppose partition and Pakistan even though major jirgas eventually backed Pakistan.

=== Declaration § opposition ===
On 21 June 1947, the Faqir of Ipi, Abdul Ghaffar Khan, and other Khudai Khidmatgars held a jirga in Bannu during which they declared the Bannu Resolution, demanding that the Pashtuns be given a choice to have an independent state of Pashtunistan composing all Pashtun majority territories of British India, instead of being made to join the new dominions of India or Pakistan. September 2, 1947,To foster tribal support for an independent Pashtunistan, the Faqir of Ipi and other rising leaders of the movement, like Malik Wali Khan of the Afridi tribesmen, organized a number of jirgas, the majority of which were held in Afghanistan but also on the Pakistani side of the Durand Line. According to reports, the jirgas highlighted the pressing need of tribal collaboration and unity against Pakistan.

The Pashtun and Baluch lands were included in Pakistan, Afghanistan strongly objected to UN without giving the locals a chance to exercise their right to self-determination. The Durrani monarchy expressed its opposition to Pakistan's UN admittance and assert irredentist claims to the Pashto-speaking regions of Pakistan's NWFP and Balochistan provinces. A 'Pakhtunistan' flag was flown in Kabul alongside the national flag of Afghanistan on September 2, 1947.

However, the British government refused to comply with the demand of the Bannu Resolution and only the options for Pakistan and India were given.

== Rebellion ==
The Faqir of Ipi rejected the creation of Pakistan after the partition of British India, considering Pakistan to have only come into existence at the insistence of the British. In 1948, the Faqir of Ipi took control of North Waziristan's Datta Khel area and declared the establishment of an independent Pashtunistan, forming ties with regional leaders including Prince Mohammad Daoud Khan and other leaders.

=== Timeline of events ===
==== March 1949 ====
During a reconnaissance 700 tribesmen were bombed by Two Pakistani jets, would return fire to those who had attacked them. Afghan media caught attention of the skirmish, which painted the meeting as a callous assault on Pashtun women and children, possibly without doing so. Remarkably, though, the tribesmen scattered rather than escalating into a more serious conflict.

===== Mughalgai raid =====
In June 1949 a Pakistan Air Force warplane inadvertently bombed the Afghan village of Mughalgai on the Waziristan border with Afghanistan while chasing the Pashtunistan separatists who attacked Pakistani border posts from Afghanistan. This attack killed 23 people and further fuelled Afghan support for Pashtunistan.

===== Gurwek Jirga =====
On 29 May 1949, the Faqir of Ipi called a tribal jirga in his headquarters of Gurwek and asked Pakistan to accept Pashtunistan as an independent state. He published a Pashto-language newspaper, Ghāzī, from Gurwek to promote his ideas.Afghanistan also provided financial support to the Pashtunistan movement under the leadership of the Faqir of Ipi. Faqir also established a rifle factory in Gurwek with the material support provided by the government of Afghanistan.

In January 1950, a Pashtun loya jirga in Razmak symbolically appointed the Faqir of Ipi as the first president of the "National Assembly for Pashtunistan".

==== July 6, 1948 ====
The Tochi Scouts captured 31 people belonging to the force of Faqir of Ipi. The communique further states that under the direction of the Political Agent for North Waziristan, Mr Hamzoni Daurs, the house of a man was razed to the ground by the scouts, which was used to facilitate Faqir of Ipi and his gang. The khassadar posts which were damaged by Faqir of Ipi's forces were apprehended; six of them were disguised as women.

==== 1950 Clashes ====
- Anti-Pakistan speeches by the King and the Prime Minister of Afghanistan resulted in Afghan raids in the frontier region on 30 September, 1950. Five thousand Afghan troops and tribesmen had crossed into Pakistan's Balochistan, resulting in the Afghan invasion of Pakistan. The low-scale invasion was repelled after six days of battle. The Afghan government denied its involvement and claimed that they were pro-Pashtunistan Pashtun tribesmen.
- On October 2, 1950, a clash resulted in minor casualties on both sides when tribal lashkar of Achakzai and Kakar tribesmen encountered Pakistani militias
- In May 1 and 3, 1951, a force of 1,000 tribesmen attacked a village inside Pakistan, Killi Walijan, near Chaman.

===== Covert Action Division =====
A group of die-hard persons from the military and Gilgit scouts were recruited and trained, to form a new directorate of the ISI. Their main task was to counter the influence of the Faqir of Ipi and to delay any Afghan incursion until the main force of the Pakistan Army arrives. Until November 1954, the CAD was mostly aimed to counter insurgency in Waziristan.

===== 1953–54 Gurwek bombing campaign =====
In 1953–1954, the PAF's No. 14 Squadron led an operation from Miran Shah airbase and heavily bombarded the Faqir of Ipi's compound in Gurwek.

== Foreign involvement ==
=== Afghanistan ===
In July 1949, The Afghan Government at Tirah in Pakistan along the border sponsored a "Pakhtoonistan Government", Haji Mirza Ali Khan (Fakir of lpi) led the Movement. The Pakistan Prime Minister, Liaquat Ali Khan termed the movement as entirely a of the imagination of certain individuals in Afghanistan. The Afghan Parliament incited the tribesmen to revolt in the name of "Pakhtoonistan", They declared that "They do not recognize the imaginary Durand or any line". The Afghan media intensified their propaganda against Pakistan.

The boundary between Pakistan and Afghanistan was violated by Afghan officers, soldiers and tribesmen. The Afghan government would also incite Pashtuns in Pakistan through radio-broad casts. One radio transmission announced

Pashtun brethren wake up, eradicate your personal enmity and rally round the red banner of Pashtunistan. Beware the nefarious designs of the enemies who are determined to shackle you in perpetual slavery. Unsheathe your swords and end the hold of Durand Line.

According to Indian observers, people suspected as Pakistani agents were arrested on the Afghan side of the border, and when an attempt upon Prime Minister Mahmud's life was made by law-breakers, Pakistan was instantly blamed by Afghans. With the rise of disputes and tensions, Pakistan responded with economic sanctions upon Afghanistan; the import of petrol into Afghanistan though Pakistan was halted which affected all of Afghanistan, including the people and even the government that relied on Pakistani trade routes. These sanctions worsened the economic situation in Afghanistan, and in return the Afghans threatened Pakistan that they would turn for help to the Soviets.

=== India ===
The dispute between Pakistan and Afghanistan caused Pakistani officials to harbour suspicions about India, that it might be supporting Afghanistan and its demand for an autonomous or semi-autonomous Pashtunistan. Prem Krishen, the deputy secretary to the Ministry of External Affairs India quoted:

From the political angle, our Ambassador's recommendation is that we should help Afghanistan generally as far as possible, and we should do what we can, without taking any direct steps, to prevent Pakistan annexing the tribal belt. Secretary- General's view, expressed in connection with the recent Afghan request for support over the Pathanistan issue, was that "we should limit ourselves to diplomatic backing of Afghanistan's stand and to substantial economic, even military aid, in the form of equipment, facilities for training, etc., so as to convince her of the sincerity of our friendship.

According to Author Elisabeth Leake, violent tribesmen in Afghanistan and the Pashtunistan movement was backed by prominent Indian authorities which gave aid to the movement. The support for tribal autonomy by India was based on the strong relationships between Congress leaders and the Khudai Khidmatgars in many ways, such as Abdul Ghaffar Khan, who was known to be close to the Congress leadership. When the UN Security Council was debating the Kashmir issue, Indian officials understood that going to great lengths to back Afghanistan directly would be an unwise move from a political and diplomatic point of view. It was also reported that Ghaffar had been issuing messages to the Fakir of Ipi with the help of Afghan authorities to cause unrest in Waziristan. Douglas Gracey also assessed that Afghanistan was being encouraged by India to cause unrest in Waziristan by supplying financial aid to the movement.

James W. Spain - an American diplomat - stated that both India and Afghanistan provided financial aid to Pashtunistan movement, and Indian authorities even made an attempt at a direct payment to Faqir of ipi. C. L. Sulzberger stated that the Faqir of Ipi had indeed received payments amounting to 600,000 rupees from India.

== Decline and aftermath ==
After sometime, the Faqir of Ipi's relations with the government of Afghanistan deteriorated and he became aloof. By this time, his movement had also started losing popular support. The Pashtun tribesmen were no longer willing to fight after the departure of British as the Faqir's reasoning of waging jihad against a foreign power was no longer considered valid.

According to Elisabeth Leake, Dawn reported on a jirga of Utmanzai tribal leaders in Waziristan who decried the Faqir of Ipi, declaring:

We tribesmen have cooperated with you the Faqir of Ipi in the past when you launched a Jihad against the imperialist encroachments of the British alien rulers. But today the Pakistan Government is our own Government. Your activities against Pakistan are, therefore, un-Islamic in concept and character and fraught with serious dangers to the unity and solidarity of the tribal people.

Although he himself never surrendered until his death, his movement diminished after 1954 when his commander-in-chief surrendered to the Pakistani authorities.

== See also ==
- Waziristan campaign (1919–1920)
- Waziristan campaign (1921–1924)
- Waziristan campaign (1936–1939)
- Bajaur Campaign
- 1949 Mughalgai raid
- Pakistan-Afghanistan border skirmishes
- Pashtunistan
- Faqir of Ipi

== Sources ==
- Barthorp, Michael (2002). Afghan Wars and the North-West Frontier, 1839–1947 (Hardcover). Cassell. ISBN 9780304362943.
- Beattie, Hugh (2019). "Chapter 7: British policy in Waziristan and the Razmak base". Empire and Tribe in the Afghan Frontier Region: Custom, Conflict and British Strategy in Waziristan until 1947. Bloomsbury Publishing. ISBN 978-1-83860-085-3.
- Blood, Peter R, ed. (1996). Pakistan: A Country Study. Diane Publishing. ISBN 9780788136313.
- Hauner, Milan (1981). "One Man against the Empire: The Faqir of Ipi and the British in Central Asia on the Eve of and during the Second World War". Journal of Contemporary History. 16 (1): 183–212. doi:10.1177/002200948101600111. JSTOR 260623.
- Kaur, Kulwant (1985). Pak-Afghanistan Relations. Deep & Deep Publications. ISBN 9780836418040.
- Latham, Robert Wilkinson (1977). North-West Frontier 1837–1947 (Paperback) (in English, French, and German). Osprey Publ. ISBN 9780850452754.
- Leake, Elisabeth (2017). The Defiant Border The Afghan-Pakistan Borderlands in the Era of Decolonization, 1936–1965 (Hardcover). Cambridge University Press. ISBN 9781107126022.
- Lee, Jonathan (2019). Afghanistan: A History from 1260 to the Present. Reaktion Books. ISBN 9781789140101.
- Martel, Gordon, ed. (2012). The Encyclopedia of War, 5 Volume Set. Wiley (published 2012-01-17). ISBN 978-1-405-19037-4.
- Malik, Hafeez (2016-07-27). Soviet-Pakistan Relations and Post-Soviet Dynamics, 1947–92 (ebook). Palgrave Macmillan UK. ISBN 9781349105731.
- Nawaz, Shuja (2018). Crossed Swords Pakistan, Its Army, and the Wars Within (Paperback). Oxford University Press. ISBN 9780199405671.
- Razvi, Mujtaba (1979). "Pak-Afghan Relations Since 1947: An Analysis". Pakistan Horizon. 32 (4): 34–50. JSTOR 41393607.
- Wilkinson-Latham, Robert (1977). North-West Frontier 1837–1947. London: Osprey Publishing. ISBN 0-85045-275-9.
