= Afghanistan–Pakistan border skirmishes =

Armed clashes between Afghanistan and Pakistan since 1949

- Part of the Afghan conflict, the Insurgency in Khyber Pakhtunkhwa, and the Insurgency in Balochistan
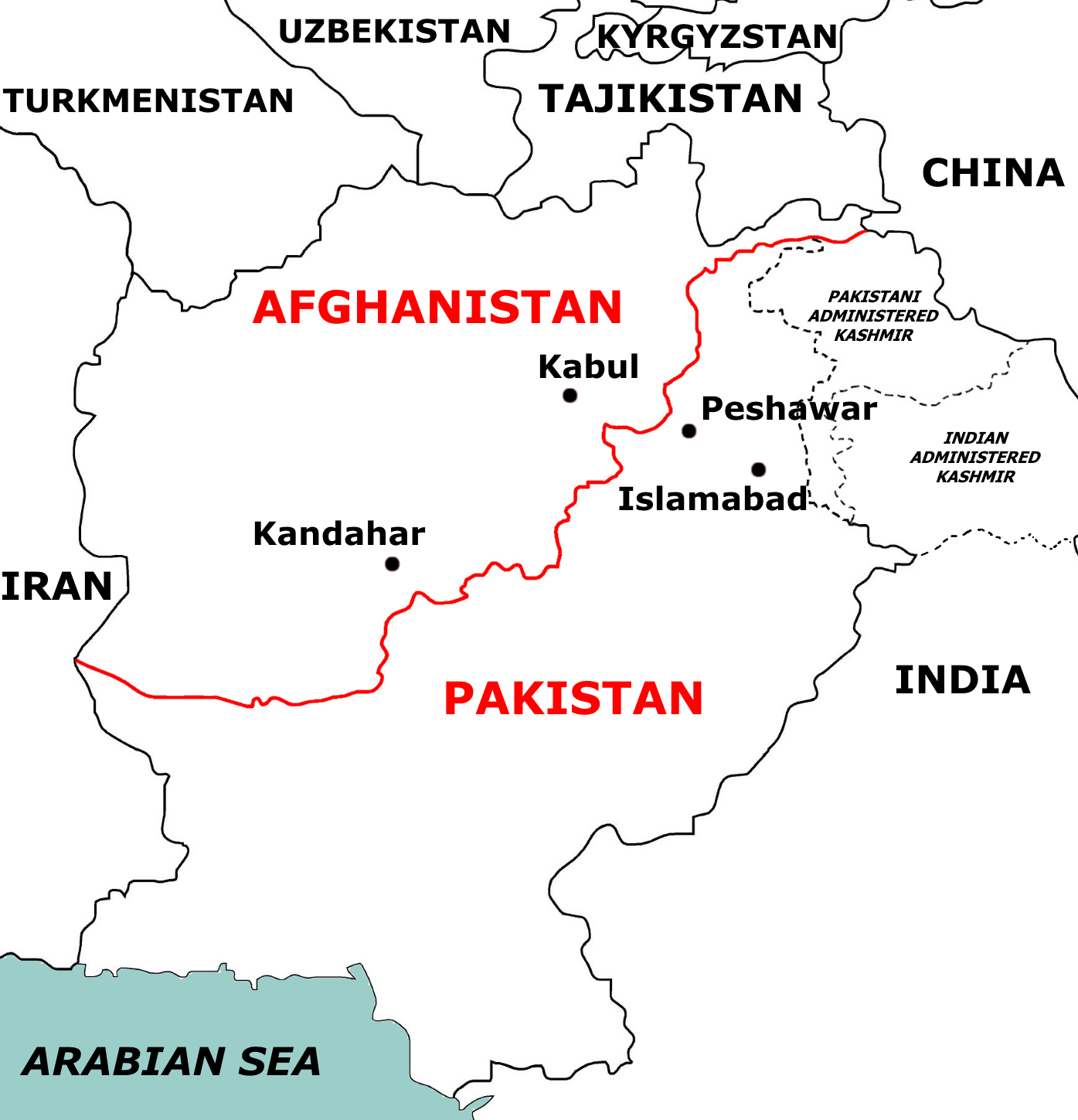
- The international border between Afghanistan and Pakistan.
Date	Main Phases: 1949–50 (1 year); 1960–61 (1 year); 1973–92 (19 years); 2007–2021 (14 years); 2022–2024 (2 years); 2024–present
Location	Eastern Afghanistan and Khyber Pakhtunkhwa, along the international border
Status	Occasional clashes

Belligerents
Kingdom of Afghanistan (1949–1973); (Afghanistan) Daoud Republic (1973–1978); Democratic Republic of Afghanistan (1978–1987); Republic of Afghanistan (1987–1992); Islamic Republic of Afghanistan (2007–2021); Islamic Emirate of Afghanistan (since 2021); Pakistani Taliban (since 2012); Jamaat-ul-Ahrar (since 2015)	Pakistan

Commanders and leaders
1949–1950; 1960–1961; Mohammad Zahir Shah; 1973–1992; Mohammad Daoud Khan X; Nur Muhammad Taraki X; Hafizullah Amin X; Babrak Karmal; Mohammad Najibullah X; 2007–present; (Afghanistan) Hibatullah Akhundzada; Ashraf Ghani; Hamid Karzai; Noor Wali Mehsud; Fazal Hayat †; Hakimullah Mehsud †; Omar Khalid Khorasani †	1949–1950; Liaquat Ali Khan X; 1960–1961; Ayub Khan; 1973–1992; Zulfikar Ali Bhutto; Fazal Ilahi Chaudhry; Sheikh Anwarul Haq; Fazal Ilahi Chaudhry; Zia-ul-Haq; Ghulam Ishaq Khan; 2007–present; Pervez Musharraf; Muhammad Mian Soomro; Asif Ali Zardari; Mamnoon Hussain; Arif Alvi; Asif Ali Zardari

Units involved
Afghan Armed Forces (Taliban forces); Afghan Army; Afghan National Security Forces (until 2021); Afghan National Army (ANA); Afghan Border Police (ABP); Armed Forces of the Democratic Republic of Afghanistan (until 1992); Afghan Air Force; 99th Missile Brigade; KhAD; Sarandoy	Pakistan Armed Forces (Northern Command); Pakistan Army; XI Corps; XII Corps; Artillery Regiment Corps; Air Defence Corps; Pakistan Air Force; Civil Armed Forces; Frontier Corps; FC KPK (North); FC KPK (South); FCB (North); FCB (South); Pakistan Levies; Federal Constabulary; Pakistani Intelligence community; ISI; MI

The Afghanistan–Pakistan skirmishes are a series of armed skirmishes between Afghanistan and the Pakistan since 1949, along the Afghanistan–Pakistan border.

The latest round of hostilities between the two countries began in April 2007. Militants belonging to internationally designated terrorist groups Tehrik-i-Taliban/Pakistani Taliban (TTP) and Jamaat-ul-Ahrar also use Afghanistan's territory to target Pakistani security personnel deployed along the border. Ahmed Sharif Chaudhry, spokesperson for the Pakistan Armed Forces, said that the presence of terrorists belonging to the TTP on Afghan soil is the reason for sporadic shelling of, and airstrikes on, Afghanistan's territory by the Pakistan Armed Forces. After de-escalation in March 2024, the conflict resurged in December 2024 with Pakistani airstrikes against Afghanistan, specifically in Paktika Province. Conflict in December 2024 marked the third round of air strikes by Pakistan on the territory of Afghanistan in a period of less than two years. The first similar Pakistani airstrikes on Afghan soil since Taliban takeover of Afghanistan were in 2022 and the second Pakistani airstrikes were in March 2024.

Starting on 9 October 2025, fighting between the two countries escalated, with a gunfight in Khyber Pakhtunkhwa, followed by reported Pakistani airstrikes in Kabul, Khost, Jalalabad, and Paktika targeting the TTP and its leader, Noor Wali Mehsud. In retaliation, the Taliban launched attacks on multiple Pakistani military posts along the Durand Line on 11–12 October, triggering intense cross-border skirmishes and reported Pakistani drone strikes in Kandahar and Helmand. Heavy fighting resumed around Spin Boldak on 15 October, after which Pakistan conducted further strikes in Kabul and Kandahar. Both sides accused each other of violating the truce and targeting civilians. On 19 October, following mediation by Qatar and Turkey, Afghanistan and Pakistan agreed to a ceasefire, under which Kabul pledged to curb militant activity against Pakistan, while both nations vowed to refrain from further attacks.

During the same period, the TTP and the Baloch Liberation Army (BLA) carried out attacks inside Pakistan, while the National Resistance Front of Afghanistan and the Afghanistan Freedom Front launched assaults against the Taliban within Afghanistan. Both countries accused each other of supporting armed opposition groups operating against them. On 21 February 2026, Pakistani airstrikes targeted TTP militant camps in Afghanistan, which escalated into border skirmishes, and eventually, a broader war between the Taliban and Pakistani forces.

== Background ==
Hostilities existed between Afghanistan and the newly independent Pakistan since 1947, when Afghanistan became the only country to vote against the admission of Pakistan to the United Nations. Before Pakistan's independence, Afghanistan advocated the independence of its north-west frontier, although the region's predominant Pashtun population had voted overwhelmingly in favor of Pakistan over India in the referendum held in July 1947. 99.02% votes were cast in favor of Pakistan. Though the proposed Pashtunistan state by Afghanistan fluctuated in size over time, the Balochistan province of Pakistan was also frequently included in the Greater Pastunistan definition to gain access to the Arabian sea in case Pakistan failed as a state, as Afghanistan had expected, but the idea became unpopular.

The International border between British India and Afghanistan was established after the 1893 Durand Line Agreement between British Mortimer Durand of British India and Amir Abdur Rahman Khan of Afghanistan for fixing the limit of their respective spheres of influence. The single-page agreement, which contains seven short articles, was signed by Durand and Khan, agreeing not to exercise political interference beyond the frontier line between what was then the Emirate of Afghanistan and what was also then the British Indian Empire. The Durand Line was reaffirmed as the International Border between Afghanistan and British India in the 1919 Anglo-Afghan War after the Afghan independence. The Afghans undertook to stop interference on the British side of the line in the subsequent Anglo-Afghan Treaty of 1919 in Rawalpindi.

Pakistan inherited the Durand Line agreement after its independence in 1947, but the Afghan Government has always refused to accept the Durand Line Agreement. Afghanistan has several times tried to seize Pakistan's western provinces of Balochistan and Khyber Pakhtunkhwa. The then Afghan Prime Minister, Muhammad Hashim, said: "... if an independent Pashtunistan cannot be set up, the frontier province should join Afghanistan. Our neighbor Pakistan will realize that our country, with its population and trade, needs an outlet to the sea, which is very essential", in an interview with the Statesman. In 1949, Pakistan Air Force bombed the Afghan sponsored militant camps in border areas including an Afghan village to curb an unrest led by Ipi Faqir propagating independent Pashtunistan. Border clashes were reported in 1949–50 for the first time.

=== 1950s–1970s ===
On 30 September 1950, Pakistan claimed that Afghan troops and tribesmen had crossed into Pakistan's Balochistan, resulting in the Afghan invasion of Pakistan. The low-scale invasion was repelled after six days of fighting. The Afghan government denied its involvement and claimed that they were pro-Pashtunistan Pashtun tribesmen.

Tensions soared with the Pakistani One Unit program, and both countries withdrew ambassadors and diplomatic staff in 1955. The Pakistani Embassy in Kabul and consulates in Kandhar and Jalalabad were attacked by mobs. In 1960, major skirmishes broke with the Afghan Forces massing out on the Afghan side of the border with tanks. These skirmishes saw the Pakistan Air Force bombarding Afghan forces. This bombardment led to a brief hiatus in the skirmishes. On 6 September 1961, Kabul formally severed diplomatic relations with Pakistan. In March 1961, months before the major battle broke out in the khyber pass area, Afghanistan reportedly provided weapons and ammunition to proxies under the leadership of Fazl Akbar, to incite an uprising in the Batmalai district of Bajaur. Pacha Gul was advised to go before an aerial counteroffensive would be triggered for serving as an agent for Afghanistan and providing resources worth of 170 million Afghanis, cash, and arms to the bajaur tribesmen which were to incite an uprising against Pakistan. The Pakistan air force acted by bombing the area where the ammunition dump was stored. The Pakistani air force then claimed to have destroyed a major ammunition dump during the raid.

In 1950 the House of Commons of the United Kingdom held its view on the Afghan-Pakistan dispute over the Durand Line by stating:

His Majesty's Government in the United Kingdom has seen with regret the disagreements between the Governments of Pakistan and Afghanistan about the status of the territories on the North West Frontier. It is His Majesty's Government's view that Pakistan is in international law the inheritor of the rights and duties of the old Government of India and of his Majesty's Government in the United Kingdom in these territories and that the Durand Line is the international frontier.

— Philip Noel-Baker, 30 June 1950

At the 1956 SEATO (Southeast Asia Treaty Organization) Ministerial Council Meeting held at Karachi, capital of Pakistan at the time, it was stated:

The members of the Council declared that their governments recognised that the sovereignty of Pakistan extends up to the Durand Line, the international boundary between Pakistan and Afghanistan, and it was consequently affirmed that the Treaty area referred to in Articles IV and VIII of the Treaty includes the area up to that Line.

— SEATO, 8 March 1956

The Afghan government, having secured a treaty in December 1978 that allowed them to call on Soviet forces, repeatedly requested the introduction of troops in Afghanistan in the spring and summer of 1979. The 1979 Soviet–Afghan War forced millions of Afghans to take refuge inside Pakistan. Pakistani officials feared that the Soviet Union began some kind of military show down and that Pakistan or at least its Balochistan province was next on the Soviet agenda. During the early 1980s, multi-national mujahideen forces (consisting of about 100,000 fighters from forty different Muslim countries in addition to 150,000 local fighters) found support from the United States, Saudi Arabia, Pakistan, and Iran in the context of the Cold War. They were trained by Pakistani military in its frontier region around the Durand Line.

=== 1980s ===
On 29 September 1984, Pakistani officials stated that an Afghan Air Force aircraft flew across the Durand Line and used its munitions on Pakistani border town Teri Mangal, situated in Khyber Pakhtunkhwa, used by the Afghan mujahideen. The plane supposedly dropped two bombs and stayed in Pakistani airspace for 2–4 minutes before flying back to Afghanistan. As a result of the bombing, 32 people were killed, 48 were injured and 200 local shops in the town were destroyed. In the same year, observers reported that Soviet–Afghan forces made 43 airspace violations and 14 ground incursions into Pakistan, resulting in 300 casualties and heavy losses for each side. The Afghan government then accused the Pakistan Army of attacking its garrisons after airstrikes spilled into Pakistani territory.

On 7 January 1986, the Afghan government submitted an official protest to the United Nations, accusing the Pakistani government of continued aggression and violations of Afghan sovereignty, despite repeated diplomatic complaints. The Afghan authorities additionally asserted that Pakistan was supporting anti-government elements (such as the Mujahideen) and enabling attacks on Afghan territory. The complaint cited numerous specific incidents:

- On 2 January 1986, two Pakistan Air Force (PAF) helicopters penetrated 3 km into Afghan airspace near Gurpary (20 km southwest of Asadabad, Kunar). These helicopters allegedly coordinated artillery shelling on Pashad from nearby areas under Pakistan's jurisdiction, causing 8 civilian casualties, 6 injuries, and the destruction of 30 houses.
- On 30 December 1985, under Pakistani air cover, two missile launchers fired 150 rockets from Bandi Sarash and Karbaz villages into Afghan territory, killing 2 teachers, 5 civilians, and destroying 22 houses in Kunar.
- On 1 December 1985, a PAF jet reportedly entered 6 km into Afghan airspace over Pozdakah (from Torkham) and returned to Pakistan after 10 minutes.

=== Present day ===
The Soviet Union decided to withdraw in 1989 and when aid dried up on Afghanistan in 1992, a civil war began. This was followed by the rise and fall of the Taliban government. Since late 2001, as high as 140,000 NATO-led troops were stationed in Afghanistan to train Afghans and rebuild their war-torn country. In the meantime, the Taliban insurgency began around 2004. To counter the insurgency and bring stability in Afghanistan, the United States built bases and garrisons for the Afghan National Security Forces, and is using unmanned aerial vehicles to carry out drone attacks in Pakistan, mainly the Haqqani network in and around the Federally Administered Tribal Areas (FATA).

In 2007, the Tehreek-e-Taliban Pakistan (TTP) militant group was established as a coalition of various hardline Sunni Islamist factions in Pakistan. This formation came in response to military actions against Al-Qaida-affiliated terrorists in the Federally Administered Tribal Areas (FATA), an area in northwest Pakistan. The group, led initially by Baitullah Mehsud, is primarily located along the border with Afghanistan and is estimated to have between 30,000 and 35,000 members. TTP aims to overthrow Pakistan's elected government to create an emirate governed by its interpretation of Islamic law. To achieve this goal, the TTP has attacked the Pakistani military and assassinated political figures. Their violent actions, including numerous suicide bombings, have resulted in the deaths of hundreds of military personnel, police, and civilians.

TTP has been responsible for some of the most devastating attacks in Pakistan, targeting churches, schools, and notable figures like Malala Yousafzai, who survived an assassination attempt in 2012 for advocating women's education against Taliban restrictions. Following the Taliban's takeover in Afghanistan in 2021, TTP has become more aggressive, as its leaders and fighters are based in Afghanistan. After ending a cease-fire with the Pakistani government in late 2022, TTP has intensified its attacks, causing casualties among Pakistani soldiers and police.

In September 2017, Brad Sherman, a US lawmaker, suggested conditioning US aid to Afghanistan to the recognition of Durand Line. He added:

I realise that's tough. They'll say, oh, don't—but the fact is, as long as Afghanistan leaves open the idea that they're claiming Pakistani territory, it's going to be very hard to get the Pakistanis involved, as we need them involved, in controlling the Afghan Taliban.

— Brad Sherman, 7 September 2017

== Islamic Republic era skirmishes ==
The following is an incomplete list of recent events relating to the Afghanistan–Pakistan skirmishes. Some of these events cannot be independently verified because news journalists usually have very limited access to reaching the areas where the fighting take place.

- 13 May 2007 – An armed clash broke out between Pakistan Army and Afghan National Army. According to Afghan sources, skirmishes erupted when Pakistan Army established a border military post inside Afghan territory in Zazai district. While according to Pakistani officials, clashes erupted when Afghan soldiers opened firing on five to six border posts in Kurram tribal region in North-West Pakistan. Governor of Paktika province, Rahmatullah Rahmat, said that as many as 41 Afghans were either killed or injured in the clash. Other Afghans sources state that 13 Afghans (9 Afghan soldiers and 4 civilians) were killed. 3 soldiers of Pakistan Army were also injured in the clash.
- 3 February 2011 – One Pakistani and 7 Afghan soldiers were killed and three others injured after a clash broke out along the border between Pakistani and Afghan forces including an Afghan Colonel. 3 Afghan Soldiers were also arrested by Pakistani Forces which were later returned. An Afghan commander in Khost confirmed the exchange of fire and alleged that the incident broke out after Pakistani troops in Waziristan opened fire towards Afghan police posts in Gurbuz District, claiming the Afghan engagement as retaliation. However, a Pakistani military official in Peshawar said that the Afghan troops fired on a Pakistan army check post in Ghulam Khan, North Waziristan and that the fire emanated from Afghan territory first. "We are responding with artillery and mortars," he added.
- June 2011 – Afghanistan blamed Pakistan for killing dozens of Afghan civilians in cross-border shelling conducted for several months. The Afghan government called for the immediate cessation of the artillery fire from Pakistan against Afghan villages. Afghan Army spokesman Mohammad Zahir Azimi said around 150 missiles fired from Pakistan had landed in different areas of Kunar province.
- July 2011 – Afghan officials alleged that around 42 Afghans were killed while another 48 were injured as a result of Pakistan military shelling in Nangarhar, Kunar and Nuristan provinces of Afghanistan. Afghan officials claim that the Pakistani military have been shelling these areas for the past five weeks. The attacks drew widespread condemnation from Afghan security officials and Tribal elders. In Kabul, around 200 people gathered to protest and condemn cross-border shelling and bombardment of eastern Afghanistan's provinces. However, Pakistan rejected Afghan government accusations, saying a "few accidental rounds may have been fired when it chased unknown militants who had crossed from Afghanistan and attacked its security installments". Moreover, Afghan Border Police officials also acknowledged the presence of terrorist belonging to Tehrik-i-Taliban (Pakistan) in areas where shelling took place. Afghan border police officials stated that after NATO forces had withdrawn from Kunar and Nangarhar provinces, terrorist belonging to Tehrik-i-Taliban (Pakistan) moved in behind fleeing Afghan civilians.
- 19 July 2011 – Pakistani officials stated that over 20 mortar shells were fired from Afghanistan which killed 4 Pakistani soldiers and wounded another 2. Pakistan blamed the Afghan National Army for the attack.
- 27 August 2011 – at least 2 Pakistani security personnel were killed and seven others injured in Chitral after militants crossed the border from Nuristan province and initiated firing. The Pakistani government blamed Afghanistan, saying since their expulsion from Pakistani tribal areas, militants were regrouping in Kunar and Nuristan with the support of local Afghan authorities.
- 7 September 2011 – Protesters from Chitral staged a demonstration outside the Peshawar Press Club against an alleged continuous Taliban infiltration into Pakistan from Afghanistan, including the abduction of 30 Pakistani children a week ago on the day of Eid ul-Fitr. The protestors said they would stand against insurgents if their region was attacked in the future and blamed the Afghan government, insisting that Afghan authorities and NATO forces were failing to contain Afghanistan-based militants. The protestors also urged the need to increase the presence of border forces and called on the federal government to take up the issue with the Afghan government to avoid future incidents.
- 25 September 2011 – Afghan authorities claimed that more than 340 rockets had been fired over the course of four days from Pakistani territory. The rockets damaged a few buildings, resulted in the death of a child and also forced hundreds to flee their homes. An employee from the Afghan Ministry of the Interior did not disclose the source of the cross-border shelling but said: "We call on Pakistan, whoever is behind the attacks, to prevent it immediately."
- 10 October 2011 – Pakistani security forces stated that they killed 30 Afghan militants when a group of 200 militants from Afghanistan crossed the border into Pakistan. One Pakistani soldier was also killed in the clash.
- 12 January 2012 – Pakistani Special Forces Troops from elite Special Services Group entered 4 to 5 km deep inside Afghan borders from Lower Dir area in pursuit of militants. Afghan Forces opened fire in retaliation, 11 Afghan Soldiers were killed in the exchange of fire. Pakistan immediately withdrew without any casualties. Afghanistan also blamed SSG Commandos for taking away the body of a killed Afghan Army Major.
- 2 May 2013 – An armed clash took place between Pakistan and Afghan soldiers. The clash resulted in death of 1 Afghan Border Police officer. 2 Afghan border police personnel were also injured. While 2 personnel of Pakistan's Frontier Constabulary were also injured in the attack.
- 8 June 2013 – Pakistan Army Aviation Bell AH-1 Cobra Gunship Helicopters crossed the border from North Waziristan into Paktia and hit 3 TTP Targets before returning.
- 31 May 2014 – Around 150 to 300 Militants belonging to Tehrik-i-Taliban (Pakistan) attacked a group of Pakistan military post at Nao top in Bajaur District. Pakistani military said that it successfully repelled the attack. In the attack 1 Pakistani soldiers and 16 militants belonging to Tehrik-i-Taliban were killed. According to Pakistani officials, gunship helicopters were also used to target Taliban positions in Afghanistan. Afghan defense minister General Bismillah Khan Mohammadi acknowledged that Pakistan military post was attacked by Talibans from Afghanistan side of the border. However, Afghan officials claim that the Pakistani gunship helicopters had crossed into Afghan territory. They claim that 4 Afghan civilians were killed and 10 others were injured as result of strikes conducted by those gunship helicopters.
- 4 June 2014 – Pakistani officials stated that terrorist from Afghanistan launched an attack on Pakistan's border post in Bajaur Agency. According to Pakistani officials, around 4 Pakistani soldiers were killed while 3 others were injured in the attack. Terrorist belonging to Tehrik-i-Taliban (Pakistan) were responsible for the attack. The attack was preceded by 31 May 2014 attack which also took place in Bajaur Agency. In the attack, 14 terrorist belonging to Tehrik-i-Taliban (Pakistan) were killed. Pakistani officials also stated that one of their border guard was killed while two others were injured. The attack by the terrorist on the border post was repelled successfully.
- 24 June 2014 – Afghan officials alleged that Pakistani soldiers have crossed the border and have conducted an attack on Afghan soldiers in Afghan territory. Afghan officials stated that the incursion took place in Kunar Province of Afghanistan and 3 Afghan National Army (ANA) soldiers and 8 Afghan civilians were killed in the attack.
- 20 December 2014 – JF-17 Thunders from Pakistan Air Force Western Air Command flew into Afghanistan in Kunar Province and reportedly hit 27 targets. Air strikes were carried out in three phases throughout the night and reportedly 50 militants were killed. An Afghan soldier was also killed when an Afghan mobile patrol was mistakenly identified as a militant vehicle by Pakistani aircraft, SSG was also sent in to get the bodies of as many militants as possible. ANA troops did not retaliate against the Pakistani aircraft as the Ministry of Defence (Afghanistan) directed them not to engage Pakistani forces.
- 23 August 2015 – Four Pakistani soldiers manning a border post were killed and four more injured in a rocket attack which originated from Afghanistan. The Pakistan military stated that it eliminated the group of militants responsible for the attack. This followed an attack on 16 and 17 August in which three Frontier Constabulary officers had also been killed.
- 13–16 June 2016 – Pakistan and Afghan military clashed along the Torkham border for a period of three days. One Pakistan army Major, Ali Jawad Changezi, was injured in the clashes along Torkham border and later died in a hospital in Peshawar on 14 June. Four Pakistani border guards and nine civilians were also injured in the clashes that lasted for three days. According to Pakistan, Afghan army started unprovoked firing at roughly 9pm on Sunday to disrupt the construction of a gate 37 meters inside the Pakistani side of the border. The gate is designed to curb illegal cross-border movement and check the movement of terrorists, and is part of the greater under-construction Pakistan–Afghanistan barrier. The Torkham border crossing was forced to close due to skirmishes. According to Afghan officials, three Afghan soldiers and two Afghan civilians were killed as a result of Pakistan army firing. Seventeen Afghan soldiers were also reported to be injured in the three days clash. According to some reports Pakistan Army had captured three Afghan border outposts. On 15 June 2016, Pakistan restarted the construction of the border gate on the Torkham border.
- 17–19 February 2017 – Over 48 hours, the Pakistani Army fired scores of missiles on Goshta District and Lal Pur District in Nangarhar province and Sirkanay District of Kunar province. Pakistani artillery rounds destroyed a dozen sites belonging to terrorist groups like Jamaat-ul-Ahrar and Tehrik-i-Taliban Pakistan, killing 15 to 20 terrorists and injuring many more. According to reports, Pakistan's cross-border shelling left more than 2,000 families homeless. This took place one day after the Sehwan suicide bombing in which ISIL-KP bombed the revered Sufi Shrine of Lal Shahbaz Qalandar in Pakistan's Sindh province, killing 91 people and wounding 300 others. The Afghan foreign ministry protested the shelling by Pakistan on its territory.
- 5 March 2017 – Afghan officials claimed that Pakistan military has been shelling parts of Kunar province and Nangarhar province for the past two weeks. Afghan officials claim that 4 Afghan civilians were killed and dozen others were wounded in the shelling. Afghan reports claim that Pakistan military had fired more than 500 rockets which had in turn had made 500 families homeless.
- 5 May 2017 – In the 2017 Afghanistan–Pakistan border skirmish, a Pakistani census team in Chaman was attacked by Afghan forces and in return Pakistani forces attacked the Afghan Army. At least seven Afghan soldiers and two Pakistani soldiers were killed, as well as at least two civilians. At least 30 civilians were wounded.
- 5 April 2018 – Afghan government officials claim that the Pakistan Air Force had conducted airstrikes in Kunar province of Afghanistan which has caused 'huge financial losses' for the Afghan government. According to Afghan government officials, Pakistan Air Force dropped around four bombs within Afghanistan's territory. However, Pakistan officials rejected Afghan government allegations and termed them baseless. Pakistani officials stated that the Pakistan security forces were countering militants groups based in Afghanistan, who had launched attacks against the Pakistani security forces.
- 15 April 2018 – Cross-border fire between the Pakistani Army and Afghan forces conducting routine "surveillance" in the Kurram Agency left two Pakistani soldiers dead and five others injured.
- February 2019 – Afghan officials wrote to United Nation Security Council (UNSC) regarding consistent violation of Afghan territory by Pakistani security forces. Afghan officials claim that from 2012 to 2017, 82 Afghan people have been killed and 183 were injured as result of Pakistani security forces attacks.
- 3 April 2019 – An Afghan-based Kharoti tribe, clashed with Pakistan's Sulaimankhel tribe in Zarmailan area in Toykhula tehsil near the Pak-Afghan border. Reports suggest that clash broke out when members of the Afghan Kharoti tribe took up positions on the hilltop in Zarmailan area and started firing at the local population on the Pakistani side. In response, Pakistan's Sulaimankhel tribe, retaliated which forced Afghan Kharoti tribe to flee while leaving behind their weapons. Seven Afghan Kharoti were also injured in the clash. The Sulaimankhel tribe was led by Malik Ibrahim Jalalkhel, Gulbahar Khan Sulimankhel and other local elders.
- 1–2 May 2019 – On 1 May 2019, Pakistan military officials stated that around 70–80 terrorists from Afghanistan, launched attack on Pakistani soldiers who were constructing a border fence along the Pakistan-Afghanistan border. Pakistani military officials stated that they successfully repulsed the attack, killing scores of terrorists while forcing others to withdraw. In the clash, three Pakistani soldiers were also killed, while seven others were injured. Pakistan summoned the Afghan diplomat to lodge strong protests against the attack and urged the Afghan government to take action against the terrorists operating from the Afghan soil. On 2 May 2019, Afghan officials claimed that four Afghan civilians were killed and five others wounded as result of cross border shelling by Pakistani forces in Khost Province. Afghanistan summoned the Pakistani diplomat to protest over Pakistani military's "violation of Afghan Airspace and launching rockets" that caused casualties and damage.
- 21 September 2020 - 1 Pakistani soldier was killed during a cross border attack on a military checkpost in Bajaur District. According to a statement by the military, the shooting came from the Afghan side of the frontier.

== Islamic Emirate era skirmishes ==
The Taliban returned to power after capturing Kabul on the 2021 offensive. The Taliban-led Afghanistan has been increasingly involved in border conflicts with Pakistan.

- 26 August 2021 – A Pakistani soldier was killed in a cross border attack on a military checkpost in Lower Dir District. In response, Pakistan Army troops killed 2 TTP terrorists and injured 3 others.
- 29 August 2021 – Gunfire from Afghanistan killed two Pakistani soldiers in Bajaur District in the second such incident since the Taliban took over Kabul. In retaliation the army said it killed 2-3 TTP terrorists and injured 3-4 more.
- 24 December 2021 – A clash took place between the Taliban-run Afghan forces and Pakistani Frontier Corps at several points along the Afghanistan-Pakistan border. According to Afghan villagers and tribal elders, Pakistani forces started shelling parts of Kunar province in response to firing by militants associated with Tehrik-i-Taliban Pakistan (TTP) on Pakistani soldiers deployed along the border. Soon after, the Afghan forces also started firing artillery targeting areas on Pakistan side of the border from Sarkano and Dangam districts of Kunar province. According to Afghan media outlets, one Afghan civilian was injured in the shelling and the areas affected by Pakistani forces shelling were Dangam, Shaltan, Sarkano and Marawar districts of Kunar province. The shelling had also caused financial losses to the local residents, according to the Afghan media. No loss of life was reported on Pakistan's side.
- 6 February 2022 – Five Pakistani troops were killed as result of an attack by "militants from inside Afghanistan" on a Pakistani border post in Kurram District, Khyber Pakhtunkhwa. The army says that it retaliated, causing heavy casualties among the militants. The Taliban government denies that the firing came from within Afghan territory.
- 24 February 2022 – Pakistan and Afghan forces clashed in Spin boldak area with each side accusing the other of initiating the fire fight. Two civilians were killed and six others were injured on the Afghanistan's side as result of the clash. No loss of life was reported on Pakistan's side. The Taliban government spokesman announced that the situation in the area is under control now and that they will investigate further to why the two sides clashed.
- April 2022 – On 9 April 2022, clashes occurred between Pakistani border guards and Afghan army in Nimruz Province, Afghanistan. No casualties were reported in this clash. On 15 April 2022, Pakistani soldiers again reportedly clashed with Afghan army around 9 p.m in Gurbuz District, Khost Province, killing two Afghan soldiers. This led to Pakistani airstrikes in Afghan provinces of Khost and Kunar killing unknown numbers of TTP militants, as per Pakistani media.
- 13 September 2022 – In the border area of Afghanistan's Paktia province and Pakistan's Kurram province, gunfire was exchanged between Afghan forces and Pakistani forces, resulting in casualties on both sides. The Taliban alleged that Pakistani forces were attempting to build a military outpost near the border, which Taliban spokesperson Bilal Karimi said was against the "rules". Karimi further alleged that Taliban forces were fired upon when they approached Pakistani troops for questioning. Pakistan Armed Forces released a statement saying that terrorists had "opened fire upon Pakistani troops" across the border.
- 13 November 2022 – During the early morning of 13 November, Afghan forces and Pakistani border guards exchanged gunfire at the Spin Boldak-Chama border crossing in Southern Kandahar. 1 Pakistani guard was killed, while another 2 were injured. The Taliban has claimed that it had suffered no casualties during the skirmish. The crossing was closed for indefinite period after the skirmish.
- 11 December 2022 – At least six civilians were killed as a result of firing from Afghan army near the Chaman border. According to the Inter-Services Public Relations (ISPR), heavy weapons including artillery and mortars were used in the firing by Afghan forces. Pakistan fired missiles in retaliation killing one Afghan soldier.
- 15 December 2022 – One civilian was killed and 11 injured on Pakistan's side when Afghan forces shelled the Chaman border crossing with mortars.
- 19 February 2023 – Afghan army clashed with Pakistani border guards which resulted in closure of Torkham border crossing.

== Skirmishes since 2024 ==
=== March 2024 ===
On 18 March 2024 Pakistan launched pre-dawn airstrikes targeting TTP hideouts in Afghanistan's Khost and Paktika province. The strikes were in retaliation to an earlier militant attack by TTP that resulted in death of seven Pakistani soldiers and six TTP militants. According to Afghan local sources, eight individuals, including five family members of a TTP commander, were killed in these airstrikes. Local sources in Afghanistan also report death of some members of TTP group in the airstrikes. However, the Taliban-led Afghan government claims the airstrikes had only killed eight civilians, which included five women and three children. Later, Afghan Defense Ministry also announced that Afghan army had targeted Pakistani troops at the border in response to the air strikes. An officer of Pakistan army was killed, while three soldiers and four civilians were injured in the clash. Taliban officials did not disclose their losses, however, the local Afghans report death of a soldier of Afghan army in the clashes. Analyst believe that the pre-dawn airstrikes were meant to send a message to Afghan Taliban officials regarding militant attacks in Pakistan originating from Afghanistan. Afghanistan led by the Taliban denied that the perpetrators were from their territory. On 17 March 2024, President of Pakistan Asif Ali Zardari vowed strong retaliation against perpetrators of the attack.

==== PAF airstrikes ====
On 18 March, in response to an attack originating from Afghanistan, the Pakistan Air Force carried out airstrikes in Afghanistan's eastern border provinces of Khost and Paktika. The Afghan government stated that the strikes killed five women and three children. An Afghan media outlet, citing local sources, also reported the deaths of eight individuals, including five family members of a TTP commander. Pakistan denied this claim, asserting that the operation was intelligence-based and targeted the Hafiz Gul Bahadur militant group—a subgroup faction of the Pakistani Taliban. Pakistani officials said the strikes successfully eliminated several militants, including Sehra (known by the alias 'Janan'), a high-value target and senior commander in the Pakistani Taliban.

In response to the airstrikes, Afghanistan's Ministry of Defence stated that its forces had targeted Pakistani positions across the border. Mortar fire from the Afghan side reportedly injured more than four civilians and three military personnel in Pakistan's Kurram District. A Pakistani army captain was killed and two other soldiers were injured in the shelling. Taliban officials did not disclose any casualties on their side; however, local sources in Afghanistan reported the death of one Afghan soldier during the skirmishes. Skirmishes were also reported in the hilly areas near the Angoor Adda border crossing in South Waziristan, though no casualties were confirmed. In the vicinity of Wana, artillery fire reportedly struck near defensive positions on both sides of the border, but no losses were reported.

==== Subsequent attacks ====
On 20 March, separatist militants belonging to Balochistan Liberation Army attacked the Gwadar port complex, which was repelled by Pakistani security forces. The clash killed eight BLA militants and two Pakistani soldiers. The Chief Minister of Balochistan claimed that the BLA attackers came from Afghanistan and were provided shelter by the Afghan government.

On 22 March, a suicide bomber rammed his vehicle into a military convoy passing through Dera Ismail Khan; this attack resulted in the death of two Pakistani soldiers and wounding of 15 others. In response to this attack Pakistan vowed a strong retaliation against terrorism.

On 25 March, Balochistan Liberation Army's Majeed Brigade attacked Pakistan's second largest Naval Base PNS Siddique in Turbat which houses American as well as Chinese aircraft. This attack was foiled by Pakistani Security forces. In this attack, 6 BLA militants were killed by the Frontier Corps outside the perimeter of the base while one Pakistani soldier was killed.

On 26 March, in Shangla District, Khyber Pakhtunkhwa, Pakistan, a suicide bomber attacked a bus transporting five Chinese laborers and their Pakistani driver on their way to the Dasu Dam, killing all of them. Pakistan police detained more than 12 people, including some Afghan nationals. But the Taliban government in Afghanistan has repeatedly denied giving safe haven to militants.

On 28 March, the National Resistance Front (NRF), claimed responsibility for a series of attacks in Kabul, reporting the deaths of three Taliban members and injuries to five others in two separate incidents. According to the NRF, the first attack targeted a Taliban checkpoint near the Sham-e-Paris Hotel in Kabul's 4th district, while the second occurred near the Lewa-e-Baba Jan area in the 11th district. The group stated that none of its fighters were harmed. The NRF also claimed to have killed a local Taliban commander, Mawlawi Siddiqullah, and his bodyguard in Baghlan Province on the same day, as well as three Taliban members in Kabul's Dahan-e-Bagh area on 27 March. The attacks marked renewed activity by the NRF and the Afghanistan Freedom Front (AFF), both of which had recently intensified operations against Taliban forces across several Afghan provinces.

Pakistan's Defence Minister Khawaja Asif in an interview to BBC Urdu stated that, "It's correct that we have been carrying out operations in Afghanistan, and we will continue to do so. We won't serve them with cake and pastries. If attacked, we'll attack back."

=== June 2024 ===
On 19 June, Abdul Manan, also known as Hakeemullah, a senior commander of Tehrik-e-Taliban Pakistan (TTP), was reportedly killed in Asadabad, the capital of Kunar province in eastern Afghanistan. According to Pakistani media, Hakeemullah had previously served with the TTP Malakand Shura and was involved in various militant activities, including targeted killings, checkpoint attacks, landmine explosions, and extortion, as well as training TTP commanders at a madrassa in Sirkanay district.

On 25 June, the Afghanistan Freedom Front (AFF) and the National Resistance Front (NRF), reported multiple attacks on Taliban forces in Kabul, claiming at least 14 Taliban members were killed or injured. Taliban authorities did not comment on the incidents. Since the Taliban's return to power, armed opposition groups, largely composed of former security personnel, have increasingly carried out guerrilla operations, particularly in Kabul and northern provinces. According to a recent UN report, the AFF conducted 14 attacks, all in Kabul, while the NRF carried out 29 attacks across multiple provinces, highlighting the continued activity of anti-Taliban resistance groups.

=== August 2024 ===
On 12 August, clashes erupted between Taliban and Pakistani forces near the Torkham border crossing in eastern Nangarhar province, leading to the temporary closure of the border. According to Taliban spokesperson Abdul Matin Qani, Pakistani forces initiated the confrontation by firing on Taliban border personnel, prompting a Taliban response. The exchange involved light and heavy weapons, including artillery, and reportedly resulted in the deaths of three Afghan civilians, including a woman and two children. Pakistani reports suggested the clash began after objections to the Taliban's construction of a checkpoint near the border. The incident led to the evacuation of nearby areas and the temporary suspension of border crossings, marketplaces, and government offices.

=== September 2024 ===
On 7 September, intense clashes occurred between Taliban forces and Pakistani border troops along the Afghanistan–Pakistan border, particularly near Khost province and the adjoining Kurram district. The fighting reportedly began after Taliban forces attempted to construct a security outpost on the Afghan side of the Pakistan-Afghanistan border barrier, prompting Pakistani troops to open fire to force the other side to stop the activity. Multiple sources reported that ongoing heavy clashes had injured at least five Pakistani soldiers, including an officer while in Pakistan's retaliation at least eight Afghan Taliban fighters were killed including two Taliban Army commanders and 16 others injured in the early hours of Saturday (7 September). The skirmishes involved heavy weaponry and lasted several hours, resulting in the deaths of at least two Taliban fighters according to pro-Taliban sources, multiple injuries among Taliban and Pakistani forces, and five civilians wounded. The clashes caused damage to homes and infrastructure in the area.

Open Source Intelligence also claimed one Soviet-era T-62 tank operated by Afghan Taliban destroyed by the Pakistani forces. A spokesman for Afghanistan's Information Ministry refused to provide any information about the clashes. This incident marked the second border confrontation in less than a week, following a previous skirmish in Paktia and Khost provinces. Heavy clashes had injured at least five Pakistani soldiers, including an officer while in Pakistan's retaliation at least eight Afghan Taliban fighters were killed including two Taliban Army commanders (Khalil and Jan Muhammad), and 16 others injured in the early hours of 7 September. One Soviet-era T-62 tank operated by Afghan Taliban was destroyed by the Pakistani forces.

On 20 September, militant attacks targeted Pakistani security outposts in the northwestern border regions of South and North Waziristan, near the Afghan border. According to Pakistani officials, the predawn clashes resulted in the deaths of at least six Pakistani soldiers and injuries to 14 others, including four described as seriously wounded. Pakistani forces responded, killing 12 militants during the engagements, including seven who were reportedly attempting to infiltrate from the Afghan side. The Pakistani officials state that they recovered a significant quantity of weapons, ammunition, and explosives from the assailants.

On 29 September, a clash occurred between Taliban fighters and Pakistani border forces in Nangarhar province, near the Durand Line, resulting in two Taliban fighters killed and three wounded. The confrontation reportedly began when Taliban forces attempted to construct a structure near the border, which Pakistani troops opposed, and both sides used heavy weaponry. This incident is part of a wider pattern of border tensions, with Afghanistan's Security Watch noting at least 45 skirmishes over the past three years—nearly half involving Pakistan—resulting in over 100 fatalities and numerous injuries. Provinces frequently affected include Khost, Paktia, Paktika, Nimroz, and Nangarhar, reflecting the ongoing disputes and strained relations between the Taliban and Pakistan along contested border areas.

=== December 2024 ===
- 4 December 2024 – Four senior Tehrik-i-Taliban Pakistan (TTP) commanders, including Rahimullah, aka Shahid Umer Bajauri, and commanders Tariq Bajauri, Adnan Bajauri, and Khaksar, were killed in an ambush in Kunar province, Afghanistan. The commanders had been invited to a feast and meetings with local TTP personnel when the attack occurred. Rahimullah, listed by Pakistan as a senior TTP figure with a Rs10 million bounty, was among those killed. According to Pakistani media outlet, the ambush adds to a pattern of high-profile TTP leadership losses in Afghanistan, with over 150 members reportedly killed on Afghan soil.
- 21 December 2024 – At least 16 Pakistani soldiers were killed in an attack by the Pakistani Taliban on an outpost in South Waziristan, eight insurgents were also killed in the clash.
- 25 December 2024 – See § 25 December 2024
- 26 December 2024 – Frontier Corps of Pakistan and Taliban border guards of Afghanistan exchanged fire at the border between Dand Aw Patan and Kurram, with no casualties or damage initially reported by either side. On 27 December, Afghan and Pakistani border troops exchanged fire for several hours in Dandaw Pattan. Many civilian homes were damaged by rockets. Two soldiers were killed and 11 were wounded in skirmishes in Bajaur District, heavy casualties were also reported amongst the insurgents.
- 27 December 2024 – Afghan and Pakistani border troops exchanged fire for several hours in Dand Aw Patan.The fighting, which reportedly began around 1 a.m. local time on 27 Dec., lasted for several hours, with both sides exchanging heavy fire. According to local sources, some rockets fired by Pakistani forces struck civilian homes and inflicted damage on the border posts of Taliban border Guards. According to Kabul-based local Tolo News, Pakistani forces fired a mortar shell in the Dand-e-Patan district of Paktia province, killing at least five people and injuring three. Afghanistan based TOLOnews, while citing its unnamed sources, also claimed 19 Pakistani soldiers were killed, however, no official information on casualties or damage on either side has been released. The Taliban only confirmed the clashes while refusing to share any further details about the incident.
- 28 December 2024 – Fighting broke out again as the Afghan Defence Ministry stated to have attacked "several points" across the border with Pakistan. A security source told AFP that one Pakistani paramilitary Frontier Corpsman was killed and seven others were wounded, while 7 to 8 Taliban fighters were reported to have been killed in retaliatory skirmishes. Pakistani security sources reported two incursions and that over 15 TTP militants and Afghan Taliban were killed, and that counter-fire forced the Afghan Taliban to abandon six posts, while only 3 Pakistani border guards were injured in return. TOLOnews reported that five Afghan were killed and three wounded by a Pakistani mortar shell fired during the clashes. Pakistan security forces released videos purportedly showing several Afghan border posts being attacked by the Pakistani forces.
- 29 December 2024 – An explosion targeted the Taliban Ministry of Interior Affairs in Kabul, killing 10 Taliban fighters and wounding five more. As per Pakistani officials, a third infiltration attempt made by the TTP militants were failed by Pakistani border forces in less than a week. Upon their failure TTP militants resorted to unprovoked firing with heavy weapons on Pakistani border posts, however no casualties were reported on either side. As per Afghanistan media, over a thousand residents of Dand-e-Patan district in Paktia have been displaced to safer areas following recent clashes with Pakistan. Many residents of Alisher district in Khost province have also abandoned their homes along the Durand Line. "There were many problems. The sound of the artillery was terrible. Children were crying, and all the residents of Dand-e-Patan have left," said Hukumran while talking to TOLOnews, who was displaced due to Pakistan firing. However Pakistani side reported no loss of civilian lives or property. The National Resistance Front of Afghanistan claimed responsibility, and said that a Taliban commander was killed and three military vehicles destroyed.
- 30 December 2024 – 15,000 Taliban troops were deployed to the Pakistan-Afghanistan border in response to the ongoing skirmishes. The force included multiple battalion level units armed with Soviet-era Tanks and Humvees left following the American withdrawal from Afghanistan. Afghan forces also claimed to have conducted Artillery strikes and reported skirmishes with Pakistan on 30 December. Pakistani Taliban released a video showing the capture of border post in Bajaur District on 30 December, the post was already vacated and Pakistani forces claimed that the troops were already transferred from that post to newer more fortified posts along the border.
- 30 December 2024 – Reports claimed that Pakistani military had entered Wakhan corridor and was preparing to seize the region, but the local Taliban sources denied Pakistani presence in the region.

==== 25 December 2024 ====
On 25 December 2024, multiple retaliation attacks were launched by Taliban border Guards on Pakistani posts in border closed areas of Kurram and North Waziristan districts in response to the December 25 Pakistani Airstrikes in Afghanistan. The Afghan Ministry of Defense confirmed the attacks stating it hit "several points" in Pakistan. Taliban spokespersons asserted that they had targeted "malicious elements" across the border in Pakistan, but did not specify casualties and extent of damage inflicted upon Pakistani security forces. According to Pakistani officials two infiltration attempt of Afghanistan-based militants were foiled. As per Pakistani official sources, "in the midst of night of December 27 and 28, a group of 20 to 25 Fitna-al-Khawarij terrorists attempted to cross into Pakistan from two locations in Kurram and North Waziristan by using Afghan Taliban Army border posts." As per Pakistani officials, Pakistani forces retaliated and countered the infiltration attempts by the TTP militants by killing 15 TTP militants and 8 Afghan Taliban and also forcing Afghan Taliban to abandon six posts, while adding that one Frontier Corps soldier was killed in the cross-fire whereas seven paramilitary personnel sustained injuries. Pakistan security forces released a video in which several Afghan border posts can be seen being devastated by the Pakistani forces.

The Pakistan Air Force launched precision airstrikes in response to the 21 December attack, on seven locations located across four villages of Barmal District of Afghanistan Paktika province initially claiming to have killing 20-25 terrorists. The villages targeted by PAF included Laman, Margha, and Murg Bazaar. Reports indicate that the Murg Bazaar village in Barmal was completely destroyed. The airstrikes took four High Value Targets (HVTs) that included terrorists camps and hideouts of key commanders, these included the compounds/hideouts in Afghanistan of Mukhlis Yar (known by the alias of Sher Zaman) who was a trainer for suicide bombers, Abu Hamza (known by the alias of Izhar) who was a senior TTP commander and Akhtar Muhammad (known by the alias of Khalil) who was the second-in-command of the Hafiz Gul Bahadur Group. All of these commanders were using camps for recruitment and training young child suicide bombers and terrorists. The fourth target struck by PAF was the "Umar Media" centre of TTP, being headed by the TTP's commander Shoaib Iqbal (known by the alias of Muneeb Jatt), from where the TTP propagated its digital propaganda. Afghan Taliban's Defence Ministry, the Afghan Taliban regime official spokesperson Zabiullah Mujahid confirmed reports of the strike carried out by Pakistani forces, but claimed that the dead and injured included a number of children and other civilians. Taliban spokesperson Zabiullah Mujahid confirmed reports of the strikes carried out by Pakistani forces but claimed that the dead and injured included a number of children and other civilians; it said that 46 people had been killed, most of whom were children and women, and 6 more people were wounded, mostly children.

This had marked the third round of airstrike launched by Pakistan on Afghanistan since the fall of Kabul in 2021. The airstrikes took place on the birthday of Pakistan's founder, Muhammad Ali Jinnah The Afghan Government reported that 46 people had been killed and 6 wounded, with the casualties including children. Five women and children were confirmed casualties as a result of the airstrikes. Afghanistan's foreign office called in Pakistan's top diplomat in Kabul to hand over a formal complaint and cautioned the diplomat about the potential repercussions of such military actions. Enayatullah Khowrazmi, a spokesman for the Afghan Ministry of National Defense said that, "Afghanistan considers this brutal act a blatant violation of all international principles and an obvious act of aggression, The Islamic Emirate will not leave this cowardly act unanswered." Pakistani military sources have anonymously have admitted that airstrikes were carried out by Pakistan originating from inside Pakistani airspace, but later said that drone strikes were involved. This marks the third airstrike launched by Pakistan on Afghanistan since the fall of Kabul in 2021. The United Nations Assistance Mission in Afghanistan (UNAMA) said that it had received credible reports of civilians having been killed, including women and children. Pakistan's foreign ministry did not directly comment on the strikes but said the armed forces conducted "operations in border areas to protect the people of Pakistan from terrorist groups" and further added, "These counterterrorism operations are carefully selected and based on accurate intelligence".

=== January 2025 ===
On 1 January, an MPA of the Pakistan Tehrik-e-Insaf, Anwar Zaib Khan, claimed that 400 militants from Afghanistan had seized five border posts along the border in Bajaur District, raising the flags of Islamic Emirate of Afghanistan and began fortifying their newly acquired positions and that the local residents began fleeing the area expecting an imminent large scale operation by the Pakistan Armed Forces. The Pakistan Armed Forces had asked the local residents of the Mulla Saeed Banda area in the Salarzai tehsil and the Mamund tehsil of the Bajaur district to evacuate, in order to allow for a clearance operation to be conducted.

On 2 January, Pakistan stated that the Afghan Taliban government had demanded PKR 10 Billion for the removal and transfer of Pakistani Taliban and their forces away from the border regions, but the Afghan Government denied this. Limited light skirmishes between the two sides continued.

On 3 January, Afghanistan-based media outlets reported armed clashes between Frontier Corps of Pakistan and Taliban Army of Afghanistan. According to reports of the Afghan media, Pakistani forces targeted the Alisher district of Khost with rocket and projectiles at 1:30 AM, Pakistan launched rocket attacks till 5:00 AM, and then the forces of the Islamic Emirate responded to these attacks. The cross border firing came to halt till dawn. Neither side commented on the clashes officially. A projectile from Pakistan targeted Taliban urban positions in Alisher area of Khost province, destroying a guest room connected to a house. Skirmishes between both sides at the border were reported by local sources. According to Afghan media, around 1:30 AM, Pakistani forces fired rockets at Taliban positions, and the Afghan army retaliated with heavy artillery. The situation reportedly calmed just before dawn. At least three villages in Afghanistan Airukam, Kaga, and Garab were reportedly hit by Pakistani mortar strikes. On the night of 3 January 2025, Afghan Taliban and Pakistani Taliban launched joint raids targeting Pakistani Border Posts, in the Spinwam area of North Waziristan. As per reports, an Afghan border security force official was killed, and two others critically injured after a Pakistani mortar struck a bunker during the clashes, a source in Sarkano confirmed to Afghan media. The exchange included over 50 rounds of firing. The mortar shelling forced hundreds of families in Kunar to leave their homes, according to local residents. On the Pakistani side, officials confirmed that mortars were fired into their territory, targeting adjacent districts of Mohmand and Bajaur. No loss of property or lives were reported on the Pakistani side.

On 6 January, an RPG fired by Afghan Taliban struck a football field in North Waziristan during an ongoing match, three players were wounded.

On 7 January, three Pakistani soldiers and 19 insurgents were killed in raids conducted by the military in northwest areas bordering Afghanistan. On 7 January 2025, a mortar shell launched from Afghanistan struck Mohmand District in Pakistan, no casualties was reported.

On 9 January, Pakistani attack helicopters struck Bajaur district in the areas where the border posts had been occupied by the TTP.

On 10 January, An Afghan Taliban soldier was killed and two others severely were wounded when a Pakistani mortar hit an afghan bunker during skirmishes and exchanges of fire. Pakistani forces also launched rockets into Afghanistan's Kunar province, killing 10 livestock animals. The exchange included over 50 rounds of rockets and shells. On the Pakistani side, officials confirmed that mortars were fired into their territory, targeting adjacent districts of Mohmand and Bajaur. No loss of property or lives were reported on the Pakistani side.

On the night of 18–19 January 2025, Pakistan's Frontier Corps killed five Pakistani Taliban insurgents attempting to infiltrate Pakistan-Afghanistan border from Afghanistan into the Zhob District of the Balochistan province.

On 23 January, the Afghan Taliban claimed that "terrorists" affiliated with the National Resistance Front (NRF) were being deployed by Pakistan to Khyber Pakhtunkhwa and Balochistan in order to conduct attacks inside Afghanistan. On that same day, six more TTP insurgents who were attempting to infiltrate the border, were killed by Pakistani forces in Zhob District.

=== February 2025 ===
From 3 February, sporadic small scale skirmishes between Pakistani and Afghan forces were reported in Bahram Chah district of Helmand province, prompting Afghanistan to evacuate civilians from the area. Both sides reinforced their positions and Taliban started blocking roads in the area. The 205th Al-Badr Corps was deployed by Taliban to reinforce the region.

On 16 February, a senior commander of the Jamaat-ul-Ahrar faction of the Pakistani Taliban was wounded as his vehicle was intercepted near the border. On the same day, there was a confrontation between Pakistan and Afghanistan border forces on Torkham border crossing from both sides, firing on both sides started between Khyber District and the corresponding Nangarhar province as well as Mohmand District and the corresponding Kunar province, officials on both sides confirmed no casualties.

On 18 February, two Pakistani soldiers were killed in a skirmish with Afghan Taliban forces in Mohmand District.

On 20 February, a Pakistani soldier was wounded during skirmishes with Afghan forces on the Ghakhi Pass border post in Bajaur District.

=== March 2025 ===
Between 2–3 March, Pakistan's Frontier Corps and Afghanistan's Taliban border guards exchanged fire. On 2 March, Taliban's Ministry of Interior confirmed that one of their border forces was killed and two others were wounded in an exchange of fire on Sunday night. Clashes resumed on 3 March, and according to sources, at least three Pakistani soldiers were injured, while three Taliban members were killed. The exchange of firing left a civilian injured on the Pakistani side of the border.

On March 3–4, clashes erupted once again, with Pakistan reporting that the Taliban was constructing a post on Pakistani soil. The border crossing was shut and a clash ensued, a Taliban soldier was killed and two Taliban soldiers were injured, while 4 Pakistani FC personnel were injured.

On 7 March, Pakistan claimed to have captured four insurgents that had crossed into Balochistan after crossing the border from Afghanistan.

On the night of 22 and 23 March, dozens of TTP militants attempted to infiltrate through the Pakistan-Afghanistan border at the town of Ghulam Khan Kallay, North Waziristan. Paramilitary border guards of Frontier Corps, foiled the attempt, by killing 16 TTP members, while seizing large amounts of weapons, ammunition and explosives. Pakistan's border guards of Frontier Corps successfully foiled attempt of the Afghanistan-based terrorists by killing 16 members of the TTP.

=== April 2025 ===
Between night of 5–6 April, a group of eight terrorists belonging to the Afghanistan-based terror outfit Tehreek-i-Taliban Pakistan were killed by the Frontier Corps of Pakistan. The terrorists were killed while attempting to cross the border fence on the Afghanistan-Pakistan border. The clash also left four other fleeing terrorists critically injured. No loss of life or material was reported on the Pakistani side.

On 10 April, an explosion in Kandahar's Aino Mina neighbourhood reportedly killed 12 members of Pakistani militant groups, including the Baloch Liberation Army (BLA) and the TTP, and wounded five others, according to local sources. The blast occurred as militants were leaving a gathering, but Taliban officials denied any airstrike, attributing the explosion to old or decaying munitions stored near the anti-narcotics department. Residents reported hearing a powerful blast followed by gunfire, and Taliban emergency crews responded to contain the incident. While casualties among Taliban guards were acknowledged, the exact number was not disclosed, and Taliban spokespeople maintained that no foreign attack had taken place. Between 6 April and 27 April 2025, Pakistan border guards of the paramilitary Frontier Corps and soldiers of the Pakistan Army killed 54 terrorists attempting to infiltrate through the Pakistan-Afghanistan border near the Bibak Ghar area in Hassan Khel Tehsil (revenue unit) of North Waziristan District in Khyber Pakhtunkhwa on April 27, according to reports by Dawn. According to the Inter-Services Public Relations (ISPR), this was the highest-ever number of terrorists killed by paramilitary forces in a single engagement throughout the campaign against terrorism. "On night 25/26 and 26/27 April 2025, [the] movement of a large group of Khwarij, who were trying to infiltrate through Pakistan-Afghanistan border, was detected by the security forces in [the] general area [of] Hassan Khel, North Waziristan District. [Our] own troops effectively engaged and thwarted their attempt to infiltrate. As a result of precise and skilful engagement, all fifty-four khawarijis have been sent to hell." the statement added. A large cache of weapons, ammunition and explosives was also recovered from the slain terrorists. The Inter-Services Public Relations added further that the death toll in Security Forces' action on infiltrating terrorists on April 27, climbed up to 71 as 17 more dead bodies of terrorists were recovered on April 28.

=== August 2025 ===
On 27 August, multiple Afghan media sources reported Pakistani drone strikes in Kunar, Nangarhar and Khost provinces of Afghanistan. Afghanistan media claimed Pakistani drones hit the Tehreek-i-Taliban Pakistan (TTP). As per Afghan media, the first strike hit Surkakh village in Spera District, Khost province, an area known to host terrorists of the Pakistani Taliban and Gul Bahadur Group which regularly carry out massacres of Pakistani civilians across the Afghanistan–Pakistan border. Local sources state strikes also resulted in the casualties of two children while six others wounded. A second strike struck a house belonging to a man named Shahsawar in Viala village of Shinwar District, Nangarhar province. The house was hit twice, leaving two children missing and two others wounded, who were taken to hospital. Residents also reported multiple explosions in three districts of Kunar province including Marawara, Sarkano and Dangam, all of which border Pakistan and considered to be hotbed of Afghanistan-based TTP terrorists. Viala village of Shinwar District is also famous hotbed and refuge of TTP terrorists. In response, the Taliban summoned Pakistan's ambassador in Kabul and handed him a formal letter of protest. Pakistan did not comment or claimed responsibility for the drone attacks.

=== October 2025 ===
On 3 October, a Taliban member, Zarin Khan from Laghman's Gharghai district, was killed in skirmishes with Pakistani forces along the eastern Kunar province border, an Afghan media outlet reported. The fighting began early Thursday in Nari district and continued intermittently until 8 a.m. Friday, forcing around 20 Afghan families to flee the area.

On 11 October 2025, in response to the Pakistani airstrikes, Afghanistan has reinforced its border with Pakistan with fire being exchanged on both sides. Afghan forces attacked multiple border posts and claimed to have captured two posts in Helmand Province while Pakistani forces claimed to have retaliated with artillery strikes at four locations, as well as by tanks and both light and heavy weaponry. On the same day, six civilians were injured when mortar rounds fired from the Pakistani side struck residential homes.

From 11 to 19 October, a large-scale conflict erupted between Afghan and Pakistani troops on the border after Pakistani airstrikes on TTP targets in Kabul triggered Taliban retaliation. This conflict was the largest since the Taliban came to power in 2021. After mediation by Qatar, Turkey and Saudi Arabia, the two sides announced a ceasefire ten days later. As per the agreement, the Afghan government agreed to cease support for groups that carry out attacks against Pakistan, notably the Pakistani Taliban, while both sides would "refrain from targeting each other's security forces, civilians, or critical infrastructure."

On 15 October, in Spin Boldak, at least seven civilians were killed and 30 wounded. The youngest victim was three months old. In Kabul's PD4 district, two explosions struck a residential area, killing at least nine people and injuring at least 37 others. Witnesses stated that rockets struck an oil tanker and nearby homes, causing widespread destruction. Residents reported hearing aircraft or drones overhead.

On 30 October, Qari Amjad, the deputy leader of the Pakistani Taliban, was killed while attempting to cross into the Bajaur District of Pakistan from Afghanistan, as per Pakistani officials. Three other members of the group, including a commander, were also killed in the operation. The Pakistani Taliban confirmed his death but did not provide details about the circumstances of the killing.

=== November 2025 ===
On 7 November, a clash broke out between Afghan Taliban forces and Pakistani border forces at the Chaman-Spin Boldak crossing, with both sides accusing each other of initiating the conflict amid peace negotiations between both sides. The Afghan Taliban spokesman, while blaming Pakistani border forces for firing first, stated that Taliban fighters refrained from responding to the gunfire to respect the ongoing talks in Istanbul. At least five people were killed and six others were injured on the Afghan side, while no casualties were reported from the Pakistani side. Some eyewitnesses in Afghanistan claimed that Pakistani fighter jets bombed areas inside Afghan territory during the clash. Following the clashes, the negotiations between the two sides reportedly deadlocked.

The Pakistani interior minister Mohsin Naqvi said that Afghan nationals had carried out the November 2025 suicide bombing in Islamabad, which killed 12 people and injured many others, further adding that the attack was allegedly planned and directed from Afghanistan by Jamaat-ul-Ahrar.

On 25 November, Afghan authorities reported that at least nine children and a woman were killed in Khost province after what the Taliban administration described as a Pakistani air strike on a civilian home in the Gurbuz district. Taliban spokesman Zabihullah Mujahid stated that the attack, reported at midnight, destroyed the residence of a local man, Waliat Khan, and that additional strikes in Kunar and Paktika provinces wounded at least four civilians. Taliban vowed "appropriate response" in the future.

=== December 2025 ===
On 4 December, Pakistani border forces shot dead three laborers who were crossing the border around the Paktika province.

On 5 December, a clash broke out between border troops of Pakistan and Afghanistan along Spin Boldak–Chaman border crossing, with both countries accusing each other of initiating the clash. According to local Afghan sources, the clash left 2 Taliban fighters and 4 Afghan civilians dead. Taliban officials confirmed death of Afghan civilians but did not comment on the death of its fighters. The clash between the two countries also injured 4 Afghan and 3 Pakistani civilians. The clash also forced many Afghan civilians to flee Spin Boldak overnight and seek refugee in other areas.

According to UNAMA, at least 70 civilians were killed and 478 injured in Afghanistan between October and December 2025. The Taliban administration stated that the findings were "close to reality."

=== February 2026 ===
On 21 February 2026, Pakistan carried out airstrikes on alleged training camps operated by Pakistani Taliban and ISIS–K in eastern Afghanistan. On 26 February, Pakistani authorities reported that Afghan forces fired into northwestern Pakistan for two hours during the evening. Both sides claimed to have conducted cross-border raids to capture or destroy each other's outposts. Afghan Taliban officials confirmed that the assault was in response to the Pakistani airstrikes.

== See also ==
- Afghan conflict
- Afghanistan–Pakistan border barrier
- Afghanistan–Pakistan relations
- Afghanistan–Pakistan skirmishes (2024–present)
- Anti-Afghan sentiment
- Bajaur Campaign
- Durand Line
- Waziristan rebellion of 1948-1954

== Notes ==
a:

- As the Kingdom of Afghanistan (1949–1950)
- As the Kingdom of Afghanistan (1960–1961)
- As the Republic of Afghanistan (1973–1978)
- As the Democratic Republic of Afghanistan (1978–1992)
- As the Islamic Republic of Afghanistan (2007–2021)
- As the Islamic Emirate of Afghanistan (since 2021)

b:

- As the Dominion of Pakistan (1949–1950)
- As the Islamic Republic of Pakistan (since 1960)

c:

- US military aid to Pakistan ended in 2018, the same year the crackdown on the TTP also ended

== Sources ==
- Dupree, Louis (2014) [1973]. Afghanistan (ebook). Princeton University Press. ISBN 978-1-4008-5891-0.
- Kaur, Kulwant (1985). Pak Afghanistan relations. New Delhi: Deep & Deep Publ. ISBN 978-0-8364-1804-0.
- Leake, Elisabeth (2017). The defiant border: the Afghan-Pakistan borderlands in the era of decolonization, 1936-1965. Cambridge studies in US foreign relations. New York, NY: Cambridge University Press. ISBN 978-1-107-12602-2.
