= Waziristan campaign (1936–1939) =

British military campaign in Asia

Date	1936–1939
Location	Waziristan, Federally Administrated Tribal Areas, British Raj, (present day Pakistan)
Result	British Raj victory

Belligerents
Waziristan; Supported by: Germany (Fascist Italy) Italy	India

Commanders and leaders
Mirzali Khan	John Coleridge; Thakur Mahadeo Singh; Muhammad Musa Khan

Strength
Unknown	~60,000 troops

Casualties and losses
650+ killed, 650+ wounded (1936–1937 only)	(United Kingdom) 30 killed, 70 wounded (1936–1937 only) (British Raj) 133 killed, 370 wounded (1936–1937 only)

The Waziristan campaign 1936–1939 comprised a number of operations conducted in Waziristan by the British Indian Army against the fiercely independent tribesmen that inhabited this region. These operations were conducted in 1936–1939, when operations were undertaken against followers of a tribal chief and adversary to the British Raj Mirzali Khan, also known by the British as the "Faqir of Ipi", a religious and political agitator who was spreading anti-British sentiment in the region and undermining the prestige of the Indian government in Waziristan at the time.

== Background ==
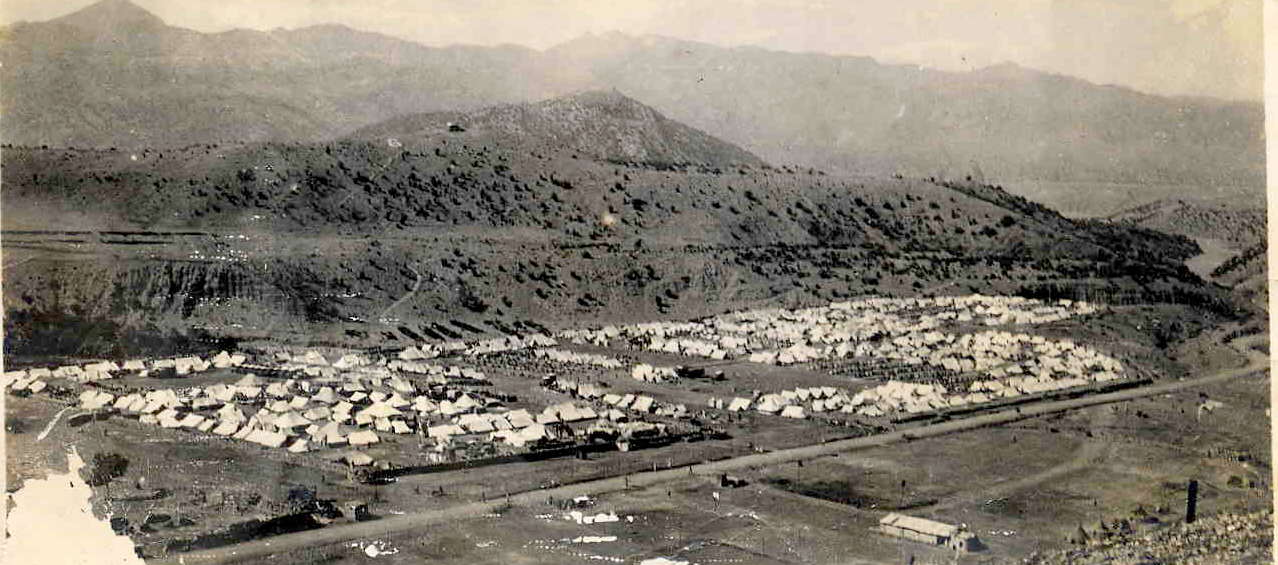
August 1938, Waziristan. Razani Military Camp. Taken from the Razmak side

In 1919–1920, the British had fought a campaign against the Wazir tribes. Minor skirmishes had continued into 1921, but after the establishment of a permanent garrison at Razmak there had been a period of relative peace in the region. Throughout 1921–1924 the British undertook a road construction effort in the region that led to further conflict during the 1921–1924 campaign. In 1936, trouble again flared up in Waziristan in the form of a political and religious agitation by Mirzali Khan. For some time, there had been growing unrest in the region, fueled by a perception of a weakening of British resolve to govern following a number of constitutional changes in India; however, following a trial of a Muslim student on a charge of abducting a Hindu girl, Mirzali Khan began spreading anti-British sentiment in earnest, claiming that the government was interfering in a religious matter.

== Operations ==
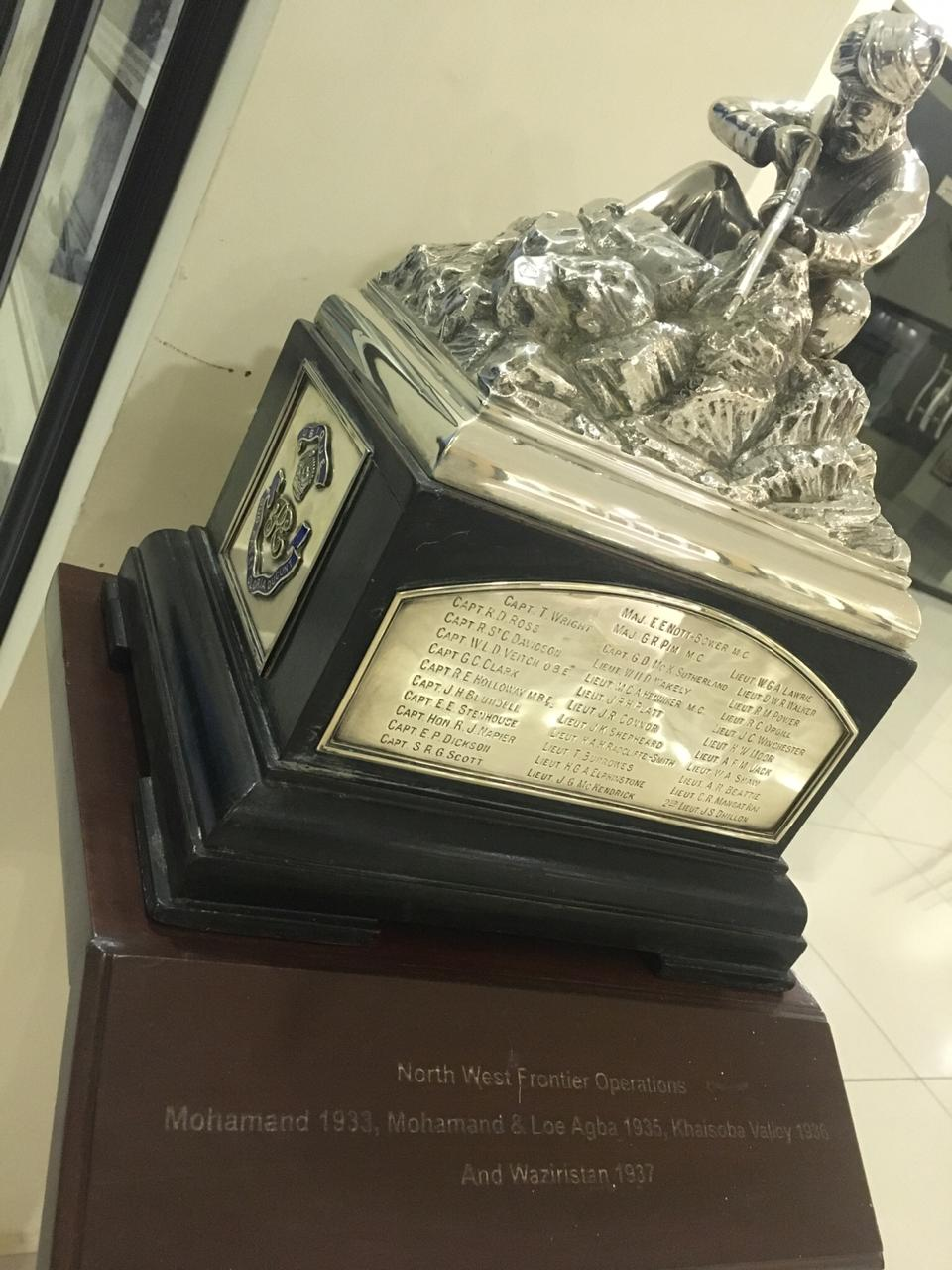
Souvenir presented by British Officers depicting Tribal Marksman in an ambush against invading British Indian Forces.

In late November 1936, in order to reassert the perception of control over the region, with the approval of the Tori Khel maliks, the government of India decided to move troops through the Khaisora Valley. This would be achieved by marching a column from the garrison at Razmak to the east, to join up at the village of Bichhe Kashkai with a column from the Bannu Brigade, which would advance from the south from Mirali. By this stage of British rule in India there were strict rules governing such expeditions on the North West Frontier, and as the purpose of the expedition was only as a demonstration to the tribesmen of government resolve, the decision was made that no offensive action was to be taken unless troops were fired upon.

The Razmak column, known as Razcol, began the march without incident, but after three days came under fire while traversing a narrow valley about 10 miles (16 km) short of Bichhe Kashkai. Intense fighting ensued as the column had to fight its way through to the village, while the two Indian battalions that made up Tocol from Mirali ran into even tougher opposition and were delayed until the following day. The supply situation was desperate and casualties numbered around 100, so it was decided to withdraw both columns back to Mirali. This was achieved, but the picquets and rearguard were heavily engaged on numerous occasions before they arrived.

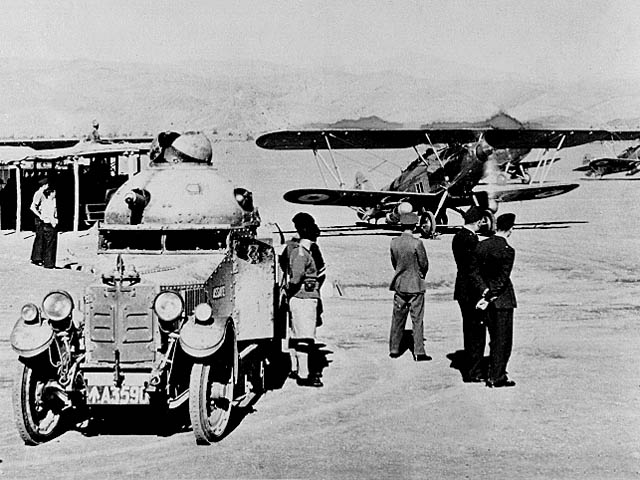
An RAF Hawker Hart and a British Indian Army Crossley armoured car, c. late 1930s

The outcome of the expedition was the reverse of the desired outcome, as, instead of demonstrating government resolve and strength, it had in fact highlighted their weakness and Mirzali Khan's support rose dramatically. For the next year, trouble and insurrection spread throughout Waziristan, as Wazirs, Dawars, Mahsuds, Bettanis, and even Afghans from across the border rallied to support Mirzali Khan's cause. By April 1937, four extra brigades had been brought in to reinforce the garrisons at Razmak, Bannu and Wanna and at the height of the campaign in 1937, some 60,000 regular and irregular troops were employed by the British in an effort to bring to battle an estimated 4,000 hostile tribesmen.

While the British attempted to stamp out the insurrection by drawing the tribesmen into decisive engagement, Mirzali Khan remained at large (and indeed was never caught), and on the main, the tribesmen managed to avoid being drawn into battle using guerrilla tactics of ambush in order to keep the initiative. In doing so, they inflicted considerable casualties upon the British and Indian troops. An example of this occurred in April 1937, when a convoy from Wanna was ambushed in the Shahur Tangi defile. Using captured mountain guns and modern rifles, the vehicles were destroyed and the exits blocked, and in the ensuing battle seven officers and 45 men were killed, while another 47 were wounded. The tribesmen did not have everything their way, however, as the British began quartering the troubled areas and destroying hostile villages with both air and ground forces. These forces included five batteries of mechanised field artillery, two companies of Mk II and Mk IIb Light Tanks and six squadrons of aircraft including Hawker Harts, Westland Wapitis and Hawker Audaxs.

By December 1937, the Mirzali Khan's support began to wane and following this, the decision was made to withdraw most of the additional brigades that had been brought up to bolster the garrisons at Razmak, Bannu and Wanna as it was decided that their presence would only serve to inflame the situation.

Trouble flared up again in 1938–39, although to a much lesser extent. On 23 July 1938, a tribal force launched an attack on the town of Bannu, killing up to 200 civilians and damaging a considerable amount of property. As a result of this, British prestige was again weakened and support for Mirzali Khan grew once again.

== Aftermath ==
After 1939, the North West Frontier quieted down, and remained reasonably peaceful. Apart from the occasional raid on a village or attack on a garrison, things would remain this way until the end of British rule in 1947 when another rebellion was launched against the state of Pakistan.

== See also ==
- No. 31 Squadron RAF
- Waziristan campaign (1919–20)
- North-West Frontier – Geography, economy, political situation, etc.
- North-West Frontier (military history)
- Pashtun Nationalism
- Pashtunistan
- Waziristan rebellion of 1948-1954
