= Advanced Jet Training Squadron PAF =

Pakistan Air Force training unit

Advanced Jet Training Squadron
- Active: Since 1994 (32 years, 2 months)
- Country: Pakistan
- Allegiance: Pakistan Air Force
- Branch: GD(P)/Flying
- Type: Squadron
- Role: Trainer
- Airbase: PAF Base Risalpur
- Nickname: AJTS
- Mottos: دے ولولہ شوق جسے لزت پرواز (Urdu for 'Bestowing motivation to the one who enjoys flying')

Aircraft flown
- Trainer: Karakorum-8

The Advanced Jet Training Squadron (AJTS) of the Pakistan Air Force is a training unit of the Flying Training Wing at PAF Academy in Risalpur.

== History ==
Following the induction of the first batch of K-8 jets in the PAF, K-8 evaluation flight was established at PAF Academy in 1994 which later transformed into the Advanced Jet Training Squadron. It started undertaking training of student pilots in 1994 with an initial batch of 8 trainees. Due to the good performance of the K-8, it initiated Fighter Conversion Courses in 2002 till the No. 1 FCU took over this role. Owing to operational needs, the fleet of the squadron was expanded in 2003 with 6 more K-8s followed by the inductions of 16 improved K-8P variants in 2007 and 2009 respectively. By then the AJT Squadron comprised 28 K-8 jets. Later in January 2012, 11 K-8Ps were transferred to the No. 1 FCU following the retirement of FT-5s in PAF. Since then the AJTS has been running with 17 aircraft (12 K-8s & 5 K-8Ps). In 2009, the squadron was handed over the responsibility of running the Sherdils aerobatics display team which was previously managed by the Flying Instructor's School.

== See also ==
- No. 1 FCU
