= No. 1 Squadron PAF =

Pakistani air force unit

No. 1 Fighter Conversion Unit
- نمبر 1 فائٹر کنورژن یونٹ
- Country: Pakistan
- Allegiance: Pakistan Armed Forces
- Branch: Pakistan Air Force
- Role: Fighter Jet Conversion (primary); Air defense & Light attack (wartime)
- Airbase: PAF Base Mianwali
- Nicknames: Rahbars; The Cradle of Air Warriors
- Mottos: بڑھے جا یہ کوہ گراں توڑ کر (Urdu for 'Advance ahead tearing down the mountains of struggle')
- Mascot: A Spear
- Anniversaries: 28 April (Foundation Day)
- Aircraft: Karakorum-8P
- Engagements: Operation Sentinel

Aircraft flown
- Trainer: Shenyang FT-5; Karakorum-8

The No. 1 Fighter Conversion Unit (FCU), nicknamed Rahbars, is a training unit of the Pakistan Air Force stationed at PAF Base MM Alam in Mianwali. It carries out Fighter Jet Conversion on newly qualified pilots of the Basic Flying Training (BFT) and Advanced Jet Training (AJT) wings from PAF Academy with Karakorum-8 advanced trainers.

== History ==
Prior to the raising of the unit, PAF pilots had to undergo Fighter conversion on Lockheed T-33s of No. 2 Squadron PAF, however they were outdated and the Chinese Shenyang F-6s had replaced most of the western origin North American F-86 Sabre and Canadair Sabres which created difficulties for PAF pilots transitioning from a US origin trainer to a Chinese origin fighter. Resultantly, the No. 1 FCU was established at PAF Base Masroor on 28 April 1975 with an initial inventory of 6 Shenyang FT-5s to provide PAF fighter pilots a more reliable and improved training platform. The unit under the command of then Squadron Leader Ehtisham Akram and various instructors translated the FT-5s Chinese manual into English, formulating a preflight checklist and taking over FCU duties from the Lockheed T-33s of No. 2 Squadron. The 50th GD(P) was the first course to undergo fighter conversion with the unit.

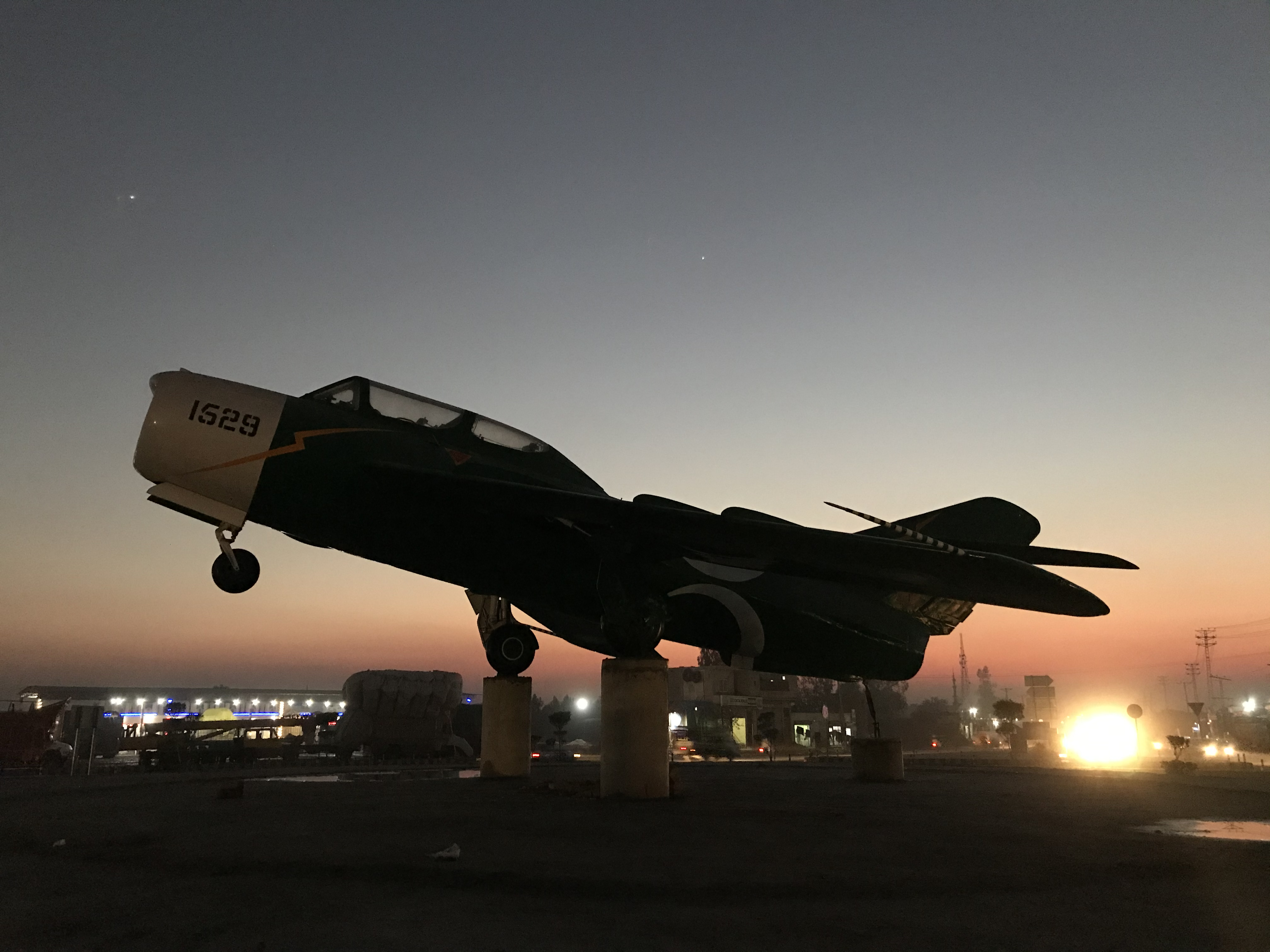
A retired Shenyang FT-5 of No. 1 FCU on display in Dera Ghazi Khan

In November 1975, the unit was shifted to PAF Base Mianwali with its aircraft fleet expanded to 50. During this time the unit kept on with its FCU duties carrying out fighter transitions to pilots who successfully completed Basic Flying Training (BFT) on Cessna T-37 Tweets at PAF Academy. By 1987, the unit's FT-5 fleet was modified by Pakistan Aeronautical Complex (PAC) to carry 2 AIM-9P Sidewinders with the unit also being assigned a secondary Air defense role during war time emergencies. In 2008, the unit was temporarily re-located to PAF Base Minhas owing to runway construction at its home base in Mianwali.

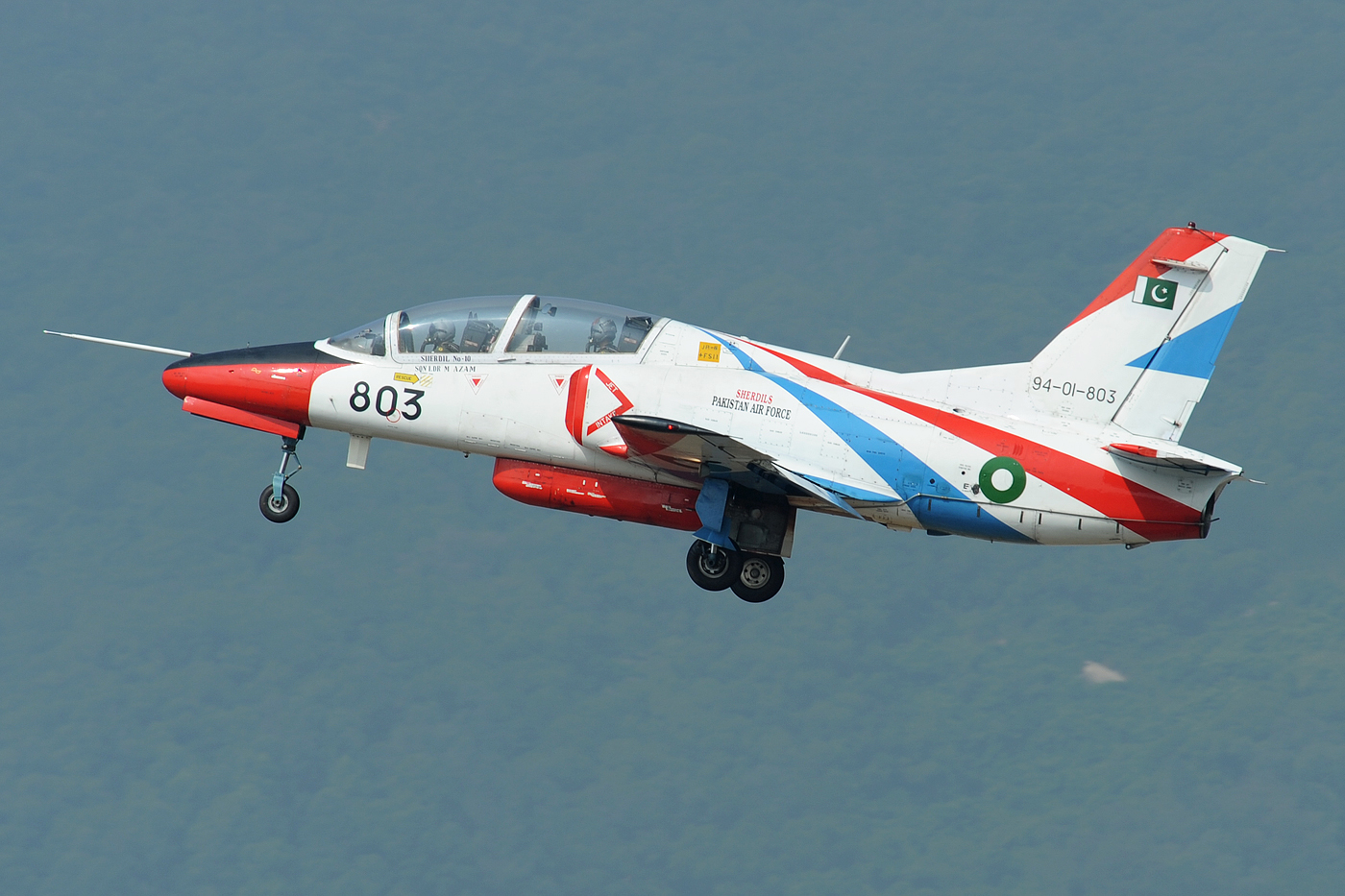
A Karakorum-8 from the Sherdils aerobatics team, similar to the ones used by the No. 1 FCU

By this time, the PAF had initiated a plan to replace the aging FT-5s with more advanced K-8Ps however delays in K-8P deliveries hindered the scheme. Since the squadron's FT-5 fleet had exhausted its airframe life, the PAF approached PAC to keep them airworthy till the arrival of the K-8s. The Life Of Type Extension (LOTEX) program conceived by PAC increased the FT-5 airframe's service life about 10% which was enough to keep the FT-5s operational till the K-8s arrived in 2011. The sturdy FT-5s after serving over 36 years with the squadron were finally replaced with the K-8s on 5 January 2012. A re-equipment ceremony attended by the air force chief at the time (Air Chief Marshal Suleman) was also organized in which the PAF paid tribute to the FT-5s long service. The 68th Fighter Conversion Course (FCC) was the first to train on the K-8Ps.

=== Operational history ===
During the 2001–2002 India–Pakistan standoff, No. 1 FCU seized its transition courses and deployed its FT-5s to various PAF Bases along the India–Pakistan border for air defense operations as part of Operation Sentinel. A detachment of FT-5s was also deployed at PAF Base Chandhar for daytime anti-UAV operations.

== See also ==
- List of Pakistan Air Force squadrons
