= Shi Ping (disambiguation) =

Shi Ping (1911–2024) was a Chinese academic, political administrator, and supercentenarian.

Shi Ping may also refer to:

- Shi Ping (aircraft designer) (1934–2016), Chinese aircraft designer
- Hei Seki (born 1962), known as Shi Ping (石平) in Chinese, Chinese-Japanese commentator and politician
