= Tanveer Ashraf Bhatti =

Pakistani Air Vice Marshal

Air Vice Marshal Tanweer Ashraf Bhatti HI(M)

Additional DG CAA
- In office 4 July 2018 – incumbent
- President: Arif-ur-Rehman Alvi
- Prime Minister: Imran Khan

Personal details
- Born: 1967 (age 58–59) Pakistan

Military service
- Allegiance: Pakistan
- Branch/service: Pakistan Air Force
- Years of service: 1988– Present
- Rank: Air Vice Marshal
- Commands: Additional DG CAA
- Battles/wars: 2001 India-Pakistan standoff 2008 Indo-Pakistan standoff War in North-West Pakistan; India–Pakistan border skirmishes (2019)
- Awards: Sitara-e-Imtiaz (Military)

Tanweer Ashraf Bhatti is a retired air vice marshal of Pakistan Air Force. He served as the Additional Director general of the Pakistan Civil Aviation Authority in 2018. He was commissioned in the GD (P) Branch of the Pakistan Air Force in December 1988. He holds a master's degree in “National Security & War Studies". He is a graduate of the Combat Commander's School, Air War College and the National Defence University. He has been awarded the Sitara-i-Imtiaz (Military).

== Commands ==
The Air Officer has served on various command and staff appointments.
Command	Location	In Office
Additional DG	Air Headquarters (Pakistan Air Force)	4 July 2018 - incumbent
Base Commander	PAF Base M.M. Alam Mianwali	2016- July 2018

== Awards and decorations ==
Service Medals
Non-operational Military Awards
Sitara-e-Imtiaz (Star of Excellence)
