= Shooter Squadron PAF =

Shooter Squadron
- Active: Since November 2017 (8 years)
- Country: Pakistan
- Allegiance: Pakistan Armed Forces
- Branch: Pakistan Air Force
- Type: Squadron
- Role: LIFT
- Airbase: PAF Base Mianwali
- Mottos: ترے سامنے اسماں اور بھی ہیں (Urdu for 'There are vast skies ahead of you')
- Mascot: An Eagle
- Aircraft: F-7P Skybolt

Aircraft flown
- Interceptor: Chengdu F-7P Skybolt
- Trainer: Chengdu FT-7P

The Shooter squadron is a Lead In Fighter Trainer (LIFT) unit of the Pakistan Air Force which operates F-7P Skybolts from Mianwali Airbase. It is the only PAF squadron without a numerical designation.

== History ==
The Shooter squadron was established in November 2017 however it's formal inauguration occurred on 11 December 2017 at PAF Base Mianwali. Various LIFT platforms were evaluated to equip the squadron which included the KAI T-50 Golden Eagle, Hongdu L-15B, Leonardo M-346 and Aero L-159 ALCA out of which the T-50 was initially favored however due to expensive operating costs, the PAF dropped the idea of acquiring it and started talks with AVIC for L-15s. Though no deal has materialized yet, the PAF Chief at the time Sohail Aman hinted the idea of using dual seat JF-17Bs but eventually F-7Ps and FT-7Ps drawn from the No. 18 OCU were allotted to the squadron.

=== Operational history ===
As of today, the squadron participates in all major operational exercises of the air force besides conducting its primary LIFT role. It has participated in Exercise Saffron Bandit and Exercise Yalghar on various occasions. Moreover, it has also took part in the Republic day parade fly-past in 2022.

== See also ==
- List of Pakistan Air Force squadrons
