= Pakistan Day Parade =

National event in Pakistan

Pakistan Day Parade یوم پاکستان پریڈ
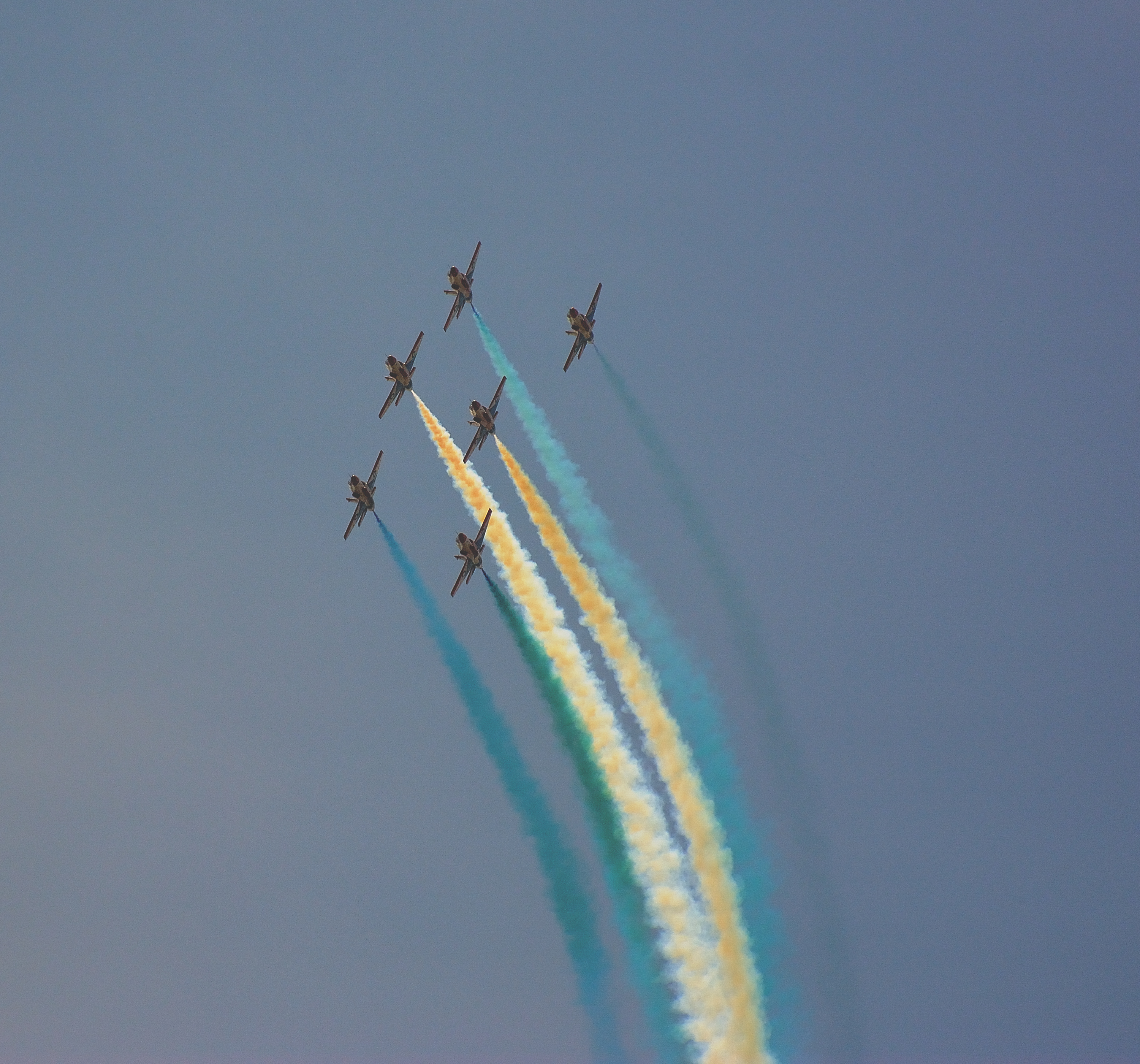
- Sherdil Aerobatic Team performing at Pakistan Day Parade
- Genre: National patriotic parade
- Begins: March 23
- Ends: March 23
- Frequency: Annual
- Venue: Shakarparian Parade Ground
- Locations: Islamabad, Pakistan
- Country: Pakistan
- Inaugurated: March 23, 1956
- Most recent: March 23, 2025
- Previous event: March 23, 2024
- Next event: March 23, 2027
- Website: ispr.gov.pk

The Pakistan Day Parade, also known as the National Day Joint Services Parade, is an annual event held at Shakarparian in Islamabad to commemorate the Pakistan Day, marking the anniversary of the 1940 Lahore Resolution. The parade is presided over by the President of Pakistan and the Prime Minister of Pakistan, alongside the Chairman Joint Chiefs of Staff Committee, and the Chiefs of the Army, Navy, and Air Force. Foreign dignitaries often attend as special guests. The event is organised by Joint Staff Headquarters and showcases the country's military strength and national unity.

== Details ==
The Pakistan Day Parade features various marching contingents from the Pakistan Army, Navy and Air Force, which perform a ceremonial march-past and present salute to the President of Pakistan. The event also includes an air show by the Pakistan Air Force, along with exhibitions of modern military equipment such as tanks, missiles, rockets, radar systems and other advanced weaponry. In addition, floats representing the culture and history of Pakistan are also presented. The Tri-Services Military Band also performs throughout the ceremony.

The parade has been held at various venues across the country. These include the Race Course Grounds in Rawalpindi, Constitution Avenue, Jinnah Avenue and Shakarparian Parade Ground, Islamabad. In 2015, the parade venue shifted to Shakarparian Parade Ground in Islamabad, where the Pakistan Day Parades take place to this day.

== Parade ==
The ceremony begins with the entrance of the marching contingents, belonging to various regiments of Pakistan Army, Navy and Air Force, in the parade ground. After that, the flag-bearing contingent, consisting of 24 National Flags of Pakistan, enters the venue. As the flag-bearing contingent enters the venue, all of the other marching contingents salute to the National Flag by lowering their Regimental Colours.

After all of the marching contingents take their place, the special guests of the ceremony enter the venue. The President of Pakistan enters last along with the Presidential Body Guard. Then, the President of Pakistan is presented Presidential Salute by the parade and the National Anthem of Pakistan is played by the band.

Shortly after that, verses from the Holy Quran are recited. The President then inspects the marching contingents participating in the parade, followed by an address to the nation.

After that, the march-past begins, the marching contingents present salute to the President as they march past the saluting dais. Following the march-past, modern military equipment such as tanks, missiles, rockets, helicopters, radar systems etc. are showcased. The Pakistan Air Force then presents an air show, showcasing fighter jets and other equipment.

The Sherdils from the Pakistan Air Force Academy at Risalpur take part in the ceremony annually, performing formation aerobatics. On the planes used by the group, the Hongdu JL-8, has been showcased at the parade since 1994. Other aircraft such as the CAC/PAC JF-17 Thunder have also been unveiled at the parade.

At the end of the ceremony, various floats showcasing the culture and history of Pakistan are presented.

== History ==
=== 1956 - 1970 ===
The first Republic Day parade, as it was then called, was held on 23 March 1956 to mark the day when Pakistan became a republic on the same day. The parade was held in Karachi where newly appointed President of Pakistan Iskander Ali Mirza took salute. Simultaneously the parades were held in other major cities and military garrisons. Commander-in-Chief of the Pakistan Army General Ayub Khan took salute in Rawalpindi. Local Governors or military commanders took salute in Lahore, Peshawar, Quetta, Multan, Bahawalpur, Rahim Yar Khan and Jhelum.

From 1957 to 1960, the central parade was held in Karachi. In 1961, the Republic Day was renamed to Pakistan Day and the parade was held in Dhaka for the first time.

In 1963, for the first and only time the central parade was held in Lahore, capital of West Pakistan. Nawab of Kalabagh took salute. At a similar event in Dhaka, Governor EP Abdul Munim Khan took salute. From 1964 onwards, the parade was held in Rawalpindi, until 1990 when it was moved to Islamabad.

In 1966, the parade had historic significance since it was held after the 1965 Indo-Pakistan War. Brig Zafar Ali Khan led 102 Brigade during the Chamb offensive and was awarded Hilal-i-Jurrat. All contingents were led by gallantry award winners.

The parade was cancelled in 1969 due to the political situation in the country.

=== 1973 - 1989 ===
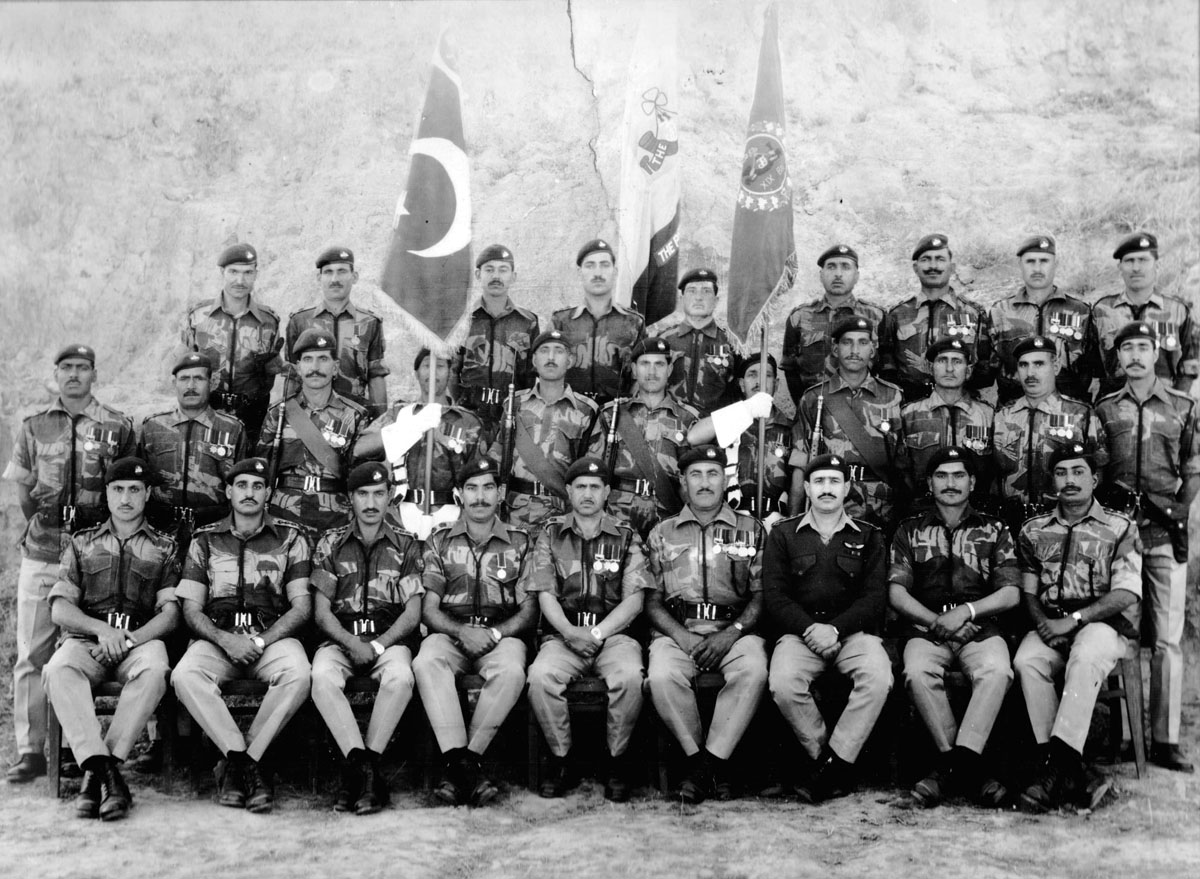
A group photo of the Frontier Force Regiment prior to the parade in 1974.

The 1971 and 1972 parade were cancelled due to the political situation in the country. In 1973, the first Pakistan Day Parade after the 1971 Indo-Pakistan War was held. Special Service Group (SSG) participated for the first time in the parade.

In 1976, parade commander Brig. Saadullah was recommended for the award of Nishan-i-Haider for showing valour during the 1971 war and was awarded Hilal-i-Jurrat. The new camouflage smock was worn by the entire parade.

In 1980, cultural and Industrial floats were included in the parade for the first time. Over two weeks prior to the parade, a conspiracy to assassinate President Muhammad Zia-ul-Haq by Major General Tajammul Hussain Malik during the ceremony was foiled.

=== 1990 - 2008 ===
In 1990, Pakistan Day Parade was moved to Islamabad. In 1994, the parade was cancelled due to inclement weather. In 1997, the OIC Head of States attended the parade.

The 2002, 2003 and 2004 parades were cancelled due to regional situation, including the war in Iraq and Afghanistan and the sudden spike in terrorism in Pakistan. In 2007, the parade was held at Jinnah Sports Complex in Islamabad.

In 2008, the parade was suspended for an extended period of time due to the growing terrorism in the country and fears that an attack on the parade was imminent.

=== 2015 - Present ===
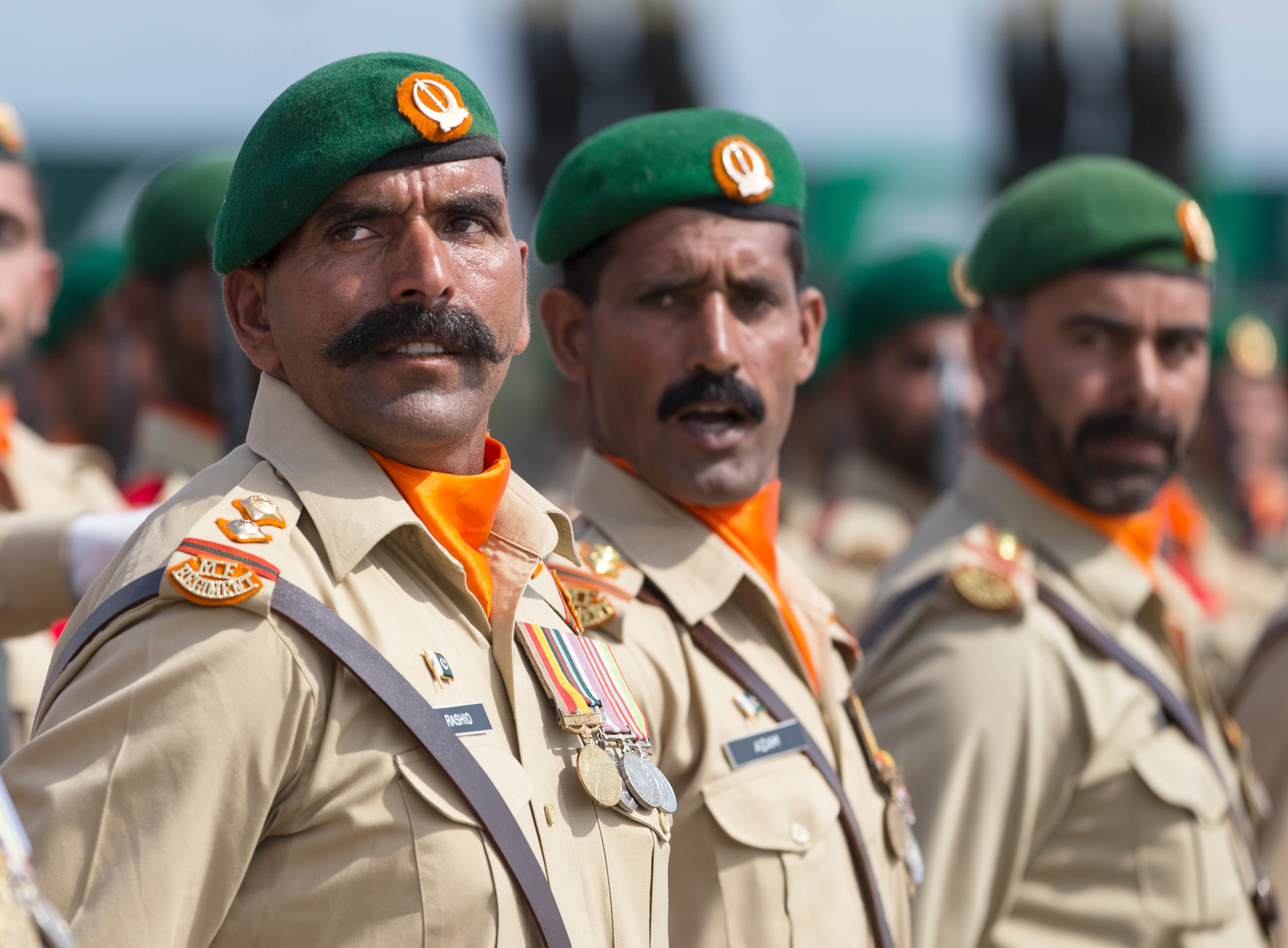
Soldiers from the Mujahid Force Regiment during the parade in 2016.

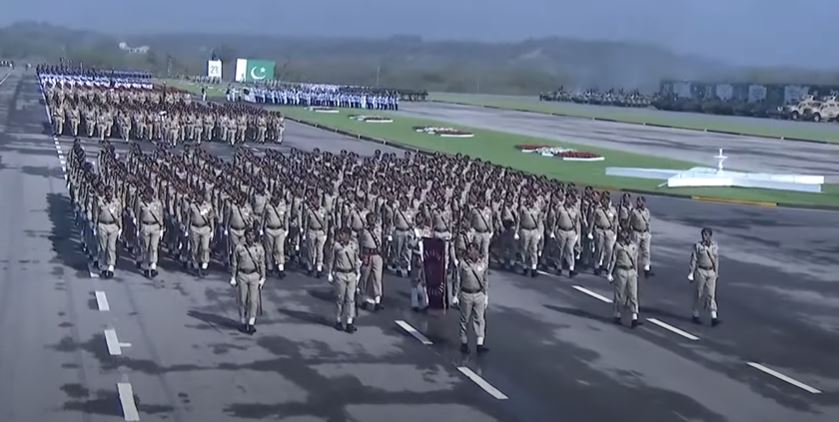
Pakistani Army Parade, March 23, 2018

After a 7-year break, the Pakistan Day Parade was reconstituted in 2015 on the 75th anniversary of the Pakistan Resolution. This decision was made in part to the anniversary's significance as well as the success of Operation Zarb-e-Azb by the Pakistan Army. As a precaution however, phone networks were blocked to thwart militants mobile cellular signals that could trigger bombs. In 2015, the parade venue shifted to Shakarparian Parade Ground in Islamabad, where the Pakistan Day Parades take place to this day.

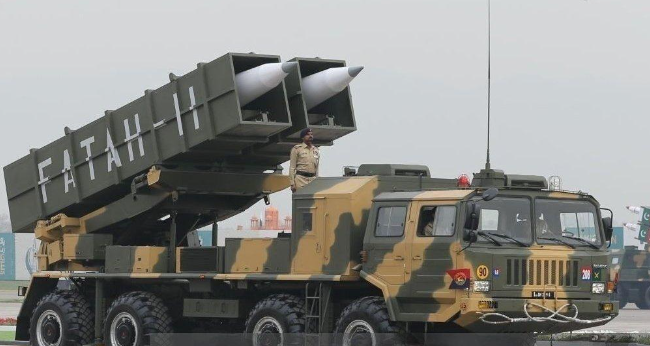
Fatah-II is a Pakistani guided rocket system

The parade was held annually without gap from 2015 to 2019 until it was cancelled in 2020 due to the outbreak of the coronavirus in Pakistan, with the cancellation being an attempt to mitigate the fall out from the pandemic. The 2021 parade was postponed due to "inclement weather and rain" and was rescheduled to March 25.

In 2022, an historic parade was held which was attended by OIC Foreign Ministers. Many foreign contingents of countries such as Azerbaijan, Saudi Arabia, Bahrain, Turkey and Uzbekistan also took part in the parade.

In early March 2023, it was announced that the 2023 Pakistan Day Parade will be held in a limited scale at Aiwan-e-Sadar due to the ongoing economic crisis in the country. The parade was then postponed to March 25 due to "inclement weather", but it was cancelled the next day.

In 2024, a full-scale parade was held which also featured contingents of the Azerbaijani and Chinese militaries. In 2025, the parade was held at Aiwan-e-Sadr, Islamabad. Due to Ramadan, the parade was held on a limited scale.

The 2026 parade was cancelled on March 17 due to the ongoing Gulf oil crisis caused by the 2026 Iran War and the austerity measures announced by the Government of Pakistan. On May 7, DG ISPR announced that a large-scale military parade will take place on August 14, 2026.

== Accidents and incidents ==
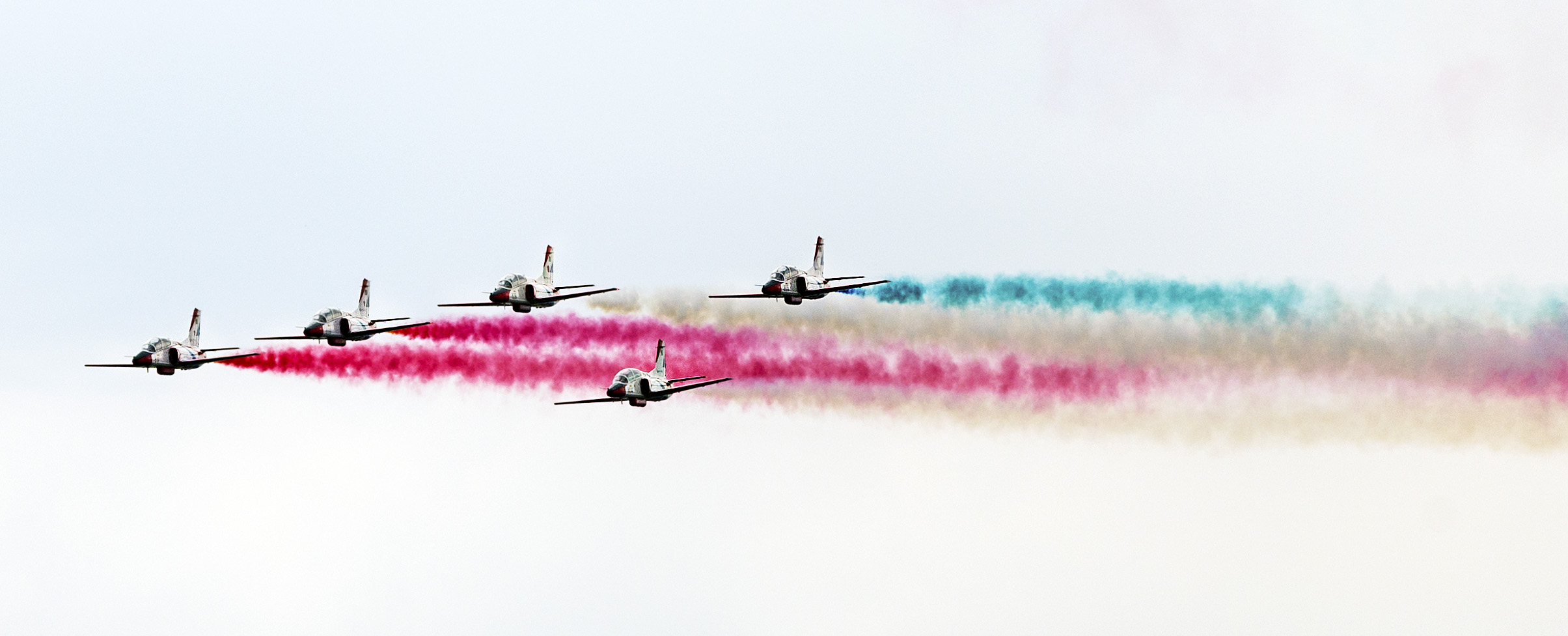
Members of the Pakistani Air Force during a parade rehearsal in 2016.

During the rehearsals for the planned parade on 23 March 2020, a Pakistani Air Force Wing Commander flying in an F-16 jet was killed when it crashed in a wooded area. On March 13, 2020, A missing man formation would later be flown by the PAF on 13 March to honor the pilot.

PAF lost an aircraft during rehearsals in 1975 while the parade was later cancelled due to inclement weather on the morning of 23 March 1975.

On March 23 1987, a Mirage aircraft crashed on approach to the parade ground. Flight Lieutenant Saeed Iqbal was killed on impact.

== Parade commanders ==
The following officers from the army have led the joint services parade:

Year	Officer	Unit	Notes
1958	Brigadier Abdul Qayyum Sher	16 Baluch Regiment	President Iskander Mirza took salute. Parade commander Brig AQ Sher was Comd 51 Brigade. In 1965 he commanded 22 Brigade and was awarded Hilal-e-Jurrat.
1960	Colonel SM Mustafa Khan	5 Horse & Guides Cavalry	Brig SM Mustafa was Station Commander Rawalpindi. C-in-C Gen Musa took salute. (At Rawalpindi. The central parade was held at Karachi, parade commander is not known.
1961	Colonel SM Mustafa Khan	5 Horse & Guides Cavalry	Brig SM Mustafa was Station Commander Rawalpindi. Brigadier Ata Muhammad took salute. The central parade was held at Dhaka where President Ayub took salute, parade commander is not known. General Musa Khan took salute at a parade in Kharian, Brigadier RG Hyder was parade commander)
1963	Brigadier Sadiqullah Khan	13th Frontier Force Rifles	For the first and only time the central parade was held at Lahore, capital of West Pakistan. However, President was unable to attend due to ill health. Nawab of Kalabagh took salute. At similar event at Dacca, Governor EP Abdul Munim Khan took salute
1964	Brigadier Azmat Hayat	Commander 10 Bde	Father of Yawar Hayat (PTV). Led 10 Brigade during Chammb offensive. Fly Past was led by Air Marshal Asghar Khan in a B-57 light bomber
1965	Brigadier Amir Abdullah Khan Niazi	2 Punjab and 5 Punjab Regt.	Later Lt. Gen.
1966	Brigadier Zafar Ali Khan, HJ	Commander 102 Bde	Historic parade post 1965 War. Brig Zafar Ali Khan led 102 Bde during Chammb offensive and was awarded Hilal-i-Jurrat. All contingents were led by gallantry award winners. Prior to the parade the President distributed 153 gallantry awards to 152 recipients (two awards for Sarfaraz Rafiqui), including 35 posthumous awards. Included 1 x NH, 13 x HJ, 135x SJ and 2 x SBt.
1967	Brigadier Agha Ali Ibrahim Akram	1 FF Regt.	Later Lt. Gen.
1970	Brigadier Iqbal Muhammad Khan		
1973	Brigadier Akram Hussain Syed	5 H, 15 L, 22 C, 26 C	Special Service Group participated for the first time. Also for the first time, the Baluch Regiment contingent was dressed in the new camouflage smock.
1976	Brigadier Saadullah Khan, HJ	14 Punjab Regt.	Brig. Saadullah was recommended for the award of Nishan-i-Haider for valour during 1971 war and was awarded HJ. The new camouflage smock was worn by the entire parade.
1978	Brigadier Mustafa Anwar Hussain	2FF, 9FF & 11FF Regt.	Later Maj. Gen.
1979	Brigadier Khawaja Rahat Latif	1 FF Regt.	Later Maj. Gen.
1980	Brigadier Zafar Hayat	FF Regt.	Cultural and Industrial floats were included in the parade for the first time.
1982	Brigadier Rehmdil Bhatti	FF Regt.	Later Lt. Gen.
1983	Brigadier Nasir Mehmood	1 Punjab Regt.	
1985	Brigadier Sultan Mehmood	Baluch Regt.	
1987	Brigadier Afzal Janjua, SJ	7 Punjab Regt.	Later Lt. Gen.
1989	Brigadier Yasub Dogar	2 FF Regt. (Guides)	
1990	Brigadier Jamshed Gulzar	22 Baluch Regt.	Later Lt. Gen. For the first time the parade was held in Islamabad.
1991	Brigadier Kamal Alam, TJ	12 Baluch Regt.	
1993	Brigadier Abdul Qadir Baluch	41 Baluch Regt.	Later Lt. Gen. Governor of Baluchistan
1995	Brigadier Hamid Rabnawaz	FF Regt.	later Lt. Gen.
1996	Brigadier Naveed Nasr	17 Punjab Regt.	Also commanded 70 Punjab Regt.
1997	Brigadier Javed Iqbal	14 Field Regt.	MS to Nawaz Sharif in 1999
1998	Brigadier Akram Sahi	Punjab Regt.	Later Maj. Gen.
1999	Brigadier Khalid Nawaz Janjua	3 Baluch Regt.	Later Lt. Gen.
2000	Brigadier Sardar Mahmood Ali Khan	19 Punjab Regt.	Later Lt. Gen.
2001	Brigadier Badar Munir	5 AK Regt.	Also appeared in Sunehre Din and Alpha Bravo Charlie), Pakistani TV series produced by ISPR
2005	Brigadier Naushad Kiani	Punjab Regt.	Later Maj. Gen.
2007	Brigadier Tariq Ghafoor	20 FF & 11 FF Regt.	Later Maj. Gen.
2008	Brigadier Ihsan ul Haq	25 FF Regt.	Later Maj. Gen.
2015	Brigadier Khurram Sarfaraz	27 Baluch Regt.	Now Maj. Gen.
2016	Brigadier Amir Majeed	29 AK Regt.	Now Maj. Gen.
2017	Brigadier Amer Ahsan Nawaz	3 Baluch Regt.	Now Lt Gen.
2018	Brigadier Amer Amin	19 FF Regt.	Now Maj. Gen.
2019	Brigadier Naseem Anwar	19 FF Regt.	Now Maj. Gen.
2021	Brigadier Azhar Yasin	23 Sind Regt.	Now Maj. Gen.
2022	Brigadier Muhammad Arsalan Tariq Ali	6 Punjab Regt.	
2024	Brigadier Irfan Ahmed Khan	12 Baluch Regt.	
2025	Major M. Faisal Yaqoob	12 FF Regt.	

== Foreign dignitaries ==
Foreign dignitaries have also been invited to Pakistan Day Parades on a regular basis. From 1964 to 2024, the following foreign dignitaries have attended the parade:

Year	Country	Foreign dignitary Guest of Honour	Notes
1964	Iraq	Abdul Salam Arif	President of Iraq
1965	United Kingdom	Prince Philip	Duke of Edinburgh
1965	Iran	Abbas Aram	Minister of Foreign Affairs of Iran
1985	Indonesia	General Rudini	Chief of staff Indonesian Army
1987	Zimbabwe	Robert Mugabe	President of Zimbabwe
1996	Mauritius	Cassam Uteem	President of Mauritius
1997	OIC Members	OIC Heads of States	To attend Extra-Ordinary OIC Summit
2005	Afghanistan	Hamid Karzai	President of Afghanistan
2018	Sri Lanka	Maithripala Sirisena	President of Sri Lanka
2019	Malaysia	Mahathir Mohamad	Prime Minister of Malaysia
2019	Azerbaijan	Colonel General Zakir Hasanov	Minister of Defence
2022	Niger	Hassoumi Massoudou	Foreign Minister of Niger
2022	Saudi Arabia	Faisal bin Farhan Al Saud	Foreign Minister of Saudi Arabia
2022	China	Wang Yi	Foreign Minister of China
2022	Thailand	Don Pramudwinai	Foreign Minister of Thailand
2022	Tunisia	Othman Jerandi	Minister of Foreign Affairs of Tunisia
2022	Mauritania	Ismail Ould Cheikh Ahmed	Foreign Minister of Mauritania
2022	Turkmenistan	Raşit Meredow	Minister of Foreign Affairs of Turkmenistan
2022	Northern Cyprus	Tahsin Ertuğruloğlu	Minister of Foreign Affairs of Northern Cyprus
2024	Saudi Arabia	Khalid bin Salman Al Saud	Minister of Defence of Saudi Arabia

== Foreign contingents ==
Along with foreign guests, many foreign contingents have also participated in Pakistan Day Parades regularly since its inception in 1956. Most recently, the contingents of Chinese People's Liberation Army and Azerbaijan Army have participated in the parade. Following is a list of foreign contingents that have participated in the parades over the years:

Year	Country	Contingent
1956	Turkey	Janissary Military Band
1956	Iran	Iran Military Contingent
1956	Iraq	Iraq Military Contingent
1956	Turkey	Turkish Military Contingent
1956	Turkey	Janissary Military Band
1956	Iran	Iran Military Contingent
1956	Iraq	Iraq Military Contingent
1956	Turkey	Turkish Military Contingent
1967	Iran	Imperial Iranian Air Force (IIAF)
1982	Turkey	Janissary Military Band
1997	Turkey	Janissary Military Band
2017	China	Beijing Garrison Honor Guard Battalion
2017	Turkey	Janissary Military Band
2018	Saudi Arabia	Saudi Arabian Special Forces
2018	(United Arab Emirates) UAE	UAE elite unit
2018	Jordan	Jordanian Armed Forces Band
2019	Azerbaijan	Azerbaijan Army
2019	China	People's Liberation Army Air Force
2019	Turkey	Turkish Air Force
2019	Saudi Arabia	Saudi Arabian Army (Paratroopers)
2019	Bahrain	Royal Bahraini Army (Paratroopers)
2019	Brunei	Royal Brunei Land Forces (Paratroopers)
2019	Sri Lanka	Sri Lanka Army (Paratroopers)
2021	Turkey	Janissary Military Band
2022	Bahrain	Bahrain National Guard
2022	Uzbekistan	Armed Forces of the Republic of Uzbekistan
2022	Azerbaijan	Special Forces of Azerbaijan
2022	Turkey	Turkish Armed Forces
2022	Saudi Arabia	Royal Saudi Land Forces
2024	China	Beijing Garrison Honor Guard Battalion
2024	Azerbaijan	Azerbaijan Army

== See also ==
- Military parade
- Lahore Resolution
- Constitution of Pakistan of 1956
