= PAF Base M.M. Alam =

Air Force base in Mianwali, Pakistan

PAF Base M.M. Alam
- Mianwali District, Punjab in Pakistan
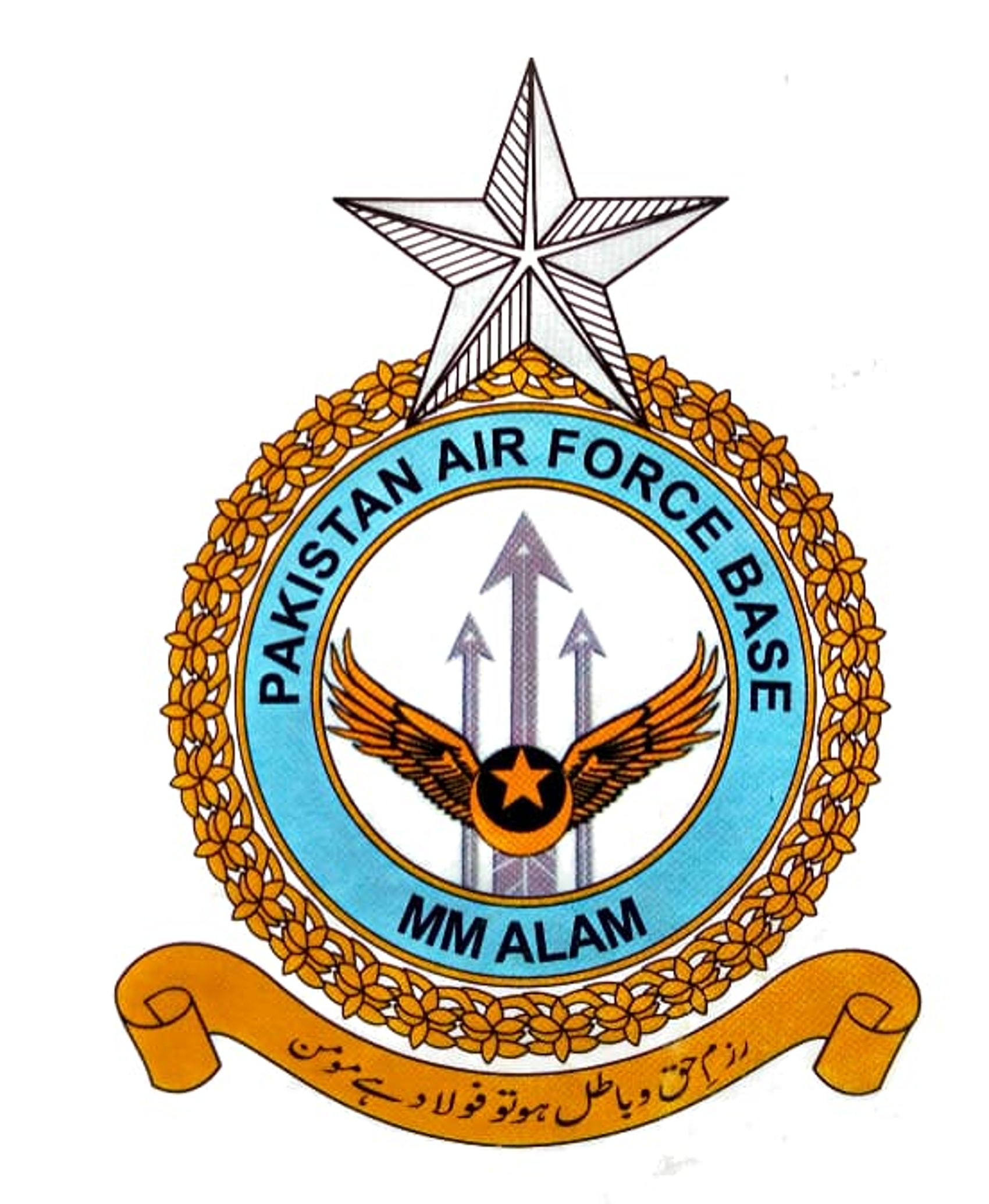

Site information
- Type: Air Force base
- Owner: Ministry of Defense
- Operator: Pakistan Air Force
- Controlled by: Northern Air Command
- Condition: Operational
- Website: Pakistan Air Force

Location
- Shown within Punjab, Pakistan PAF Base M.M. Alam (Pakistan)
- Coordinates: 32°33′47″N 71°34′15″E

Site history
- Built: 1942
- Built for: British India; Pakistan Air Force
- Built by: British Raj (foundation)
- In use: 1942 - present
- Battles/wars: 1965 Indo-Pakistani war 1971 Indo-Pakistani war Operation Sentinel; Operation Swift Retort

Garrison information
- Garrison: 37 Combat Training Wing
- Occupants: 1 FCU "Rahbars"; 20 OCU "Cheetahs"; Shooter Squadron; 63 CUAS Squadron "Harriers"; 86 SAR Squadron "Swallows"

Airfield information
- Identifiers: IATA: MWD, ICAO: OPMI
- Elevation: 210 metres (689 ft) AMSL
Runways
Direction	Length and surface
06R/24L	3,097 metres (10,161 ft) Asphalt
06L/24R	3,154 metres (10,348 ft) Asphalt

Pakistan Air Force Base M.M. Alam (IATA: MWD, ICAO: OPMI) is a Pakistan Air Force airbase located at Mianwali, in the Punjab province of Pakistan. The base was renamed in 2014 after Pakistani fighter pilot Muhammad Mahmood Alam. It was previously known as PAF Base Mianwali.

== History ==
The base was originally named RAF Mianwali and was home to the following squadrons:

- No. 27 Squadron RAF between 1 and 14 April 1920 with de Havilland DH.9A
- Detachment from No. 60 Squadron RAF between April 1920 and March 1923 with the Airco DH.10/10A Amiens
- Detachment from No. 97 Squadron RAF between November 1919 and March 1920 with the DH.10
- No. 99 Squadron RAF between 26 September 1919 and 1 April 1920 with the DH.9A

Originally a World War II airstrip, it was decided that Mianwali would be upgraded to a satellite airbase for PAF Base Mushaf (then PAF Base Sargodha) during the 1965 Indo-Pak War to act as an alternate recovery airfield. The airbase became operational in October 1971 and was first commanded by Group Captain S. M. Dutta. Aircraft of different types, including the Shenyang F-6, were operated from the base during the 1971 Indo-Pak War. Pilots and anti-aircraft gunners of Mianwali airbase shot down 5 enemy aircraft during that conflict, during the first three days of which the base came under regular attacks.

The airbase was again upgraded to a permanent operational airbase in August 1974, although construction of facilities was not completed for another three years. The first base commander was Wing Commander Sultan Muhammad. During November 1975, the No.1 Fighter Conversion Unit (FCU) was transferred to Mianwali airbase from PAF Base Masroor where it began fighter conversion training using the FT-5 dual-seat training aircraft. Over 500 fighter pilots have since graduated.

In November 1976, No.14 Squadron was transferred to Mianwali airbase for operational conversion of graduates of the No.1 Fighter Conversion Unit from dual-seat to the Shenyang F-6 single-seat fighter aircraft. When No.14 Squadron was selected to operate the F-16 in August 1986, it was transferred away from Mianwali airbase and replaced by No.25 Squadron. Further construction of facilities and transfer of units to the base took place during the 1980s.

On January 5, 2012, No. 1 Fighter Conversion Unit re-equipped, after end of long and illustrious services rendered by veteran Chinese FT-5 fighter trainer aircraft. No 1 FCU, is now being re-equipped with modern state-of-the-art K-8P fighter trainer aircraft.

Air Chief Marshal Rao Qamar Suleman, Chief of the Air Staff, Pakistan Air Force was the Chief Guest at the occasion. In this regard the advanced and focused training at No 1 FCU on K-8P aircraft would assist Pakistan Air Force to remain an air force second to none.

== Base Commander ==
Name	Rank	In Office
Azman Khalil	Air commodore	2016-2018
Tahir Rafique Butt	Air commodore	2001-2003
Sultan Muhammad	Wing Commander	1975-1977

== Renaming of airbase ==
The airbase was renamed as "PAF Base M.M. Alam" on 20 March 2014 after the Indo-Pakistani war of 1965 veteran Muhammad Mahmood Alam.
