= Shi Ping (aircraft designer) =

Chinese aircraft designer (1934–2016)

- 石屏
- Born: 25 March 1934; Poyang, Jiangxi, China
- Died: 10 May 2016 (aged 82); Nanchang, Jiangxi, China
- Education: Nanjing Aeronautical Institute
- Known for: Chief designer of jet trainer Hongdu JL-8
- Scientific career
- Fields: Aircraft design
- Workplaces: Hongdu Aviation Industry Group

Shi Ping (Chinese: 石屏; pinyin: Shí Píng; 25 March 1934 – 10 May 2016) was a Chinese aircraft designer, who is responsible for the development of the two-seat intermediate jet trainer Hongdu JL-8. He was a member of the Chinese Academy of Engineering.

== Biography ==
Shi was born on 25 March 1934 in Poyang County, Jiangxi. He obtained a bachelor's degree from Nanjing Aeronautical Institute in 1956. He was assigned to Hongdu Machinery-building Factory as a designer after his graduation. He was a designer of Nanchang CJ-6, Nanchang Q-5 and Dongfeng-103 between 1950s and 1970s. Shi was appointed as the chief designer for Hongdu JL-8 in 1987.

In 2003, Shi was elected a member of the Chinese Academy of Engineering. He was the chief designer of Hongdu Aviation Industry Group as well as the adjunct professor of Nanjing University of Aeronautics and Astronautics (1994–2016), Nanchang Institute of Aeronautical Technology (2003–16) and Jiangxi University of Science and Technology (2004–16).

Shi died on 10 May 2016 at the age of 82 in Nanchang.
