= Sherdils =

Aerobatics team of Pakistan Air force

- Sherdils Aerobatics display team patch
- Active: 1972–present
- Country: Pakistan
- Branch: Pakistan Air Force & PAF Academy Asghar Khan
- Role: Aerobatics display team
- Size: 9 aircraft
- Garrison/HQ: PAF Academy, Risalpur
- Nickname: Lion Hearts
- Colors: Green, Red, White and Blue (2017–present); Red, White, and Blue (1972–2017)
- Aircraft: K-8P Karakorum (2009–Present); Cessna T-37 Tweet (1972–2009)
- Website: Sherdils

Sherdils (Urdu: ﺸﻴر دﻝ; English: Lion Hearts) are an aerobatics display team of the Pakistan Air Force (PAF). The team is based out of the Pakistan Air Force Academy Asghar Khan, in Risalpur, Pakistan. Currently, it consists of nine Karakoram K-8P aircraft.

The Sherdils are not a full-time aerobatic team, rather the pilots are selected from the PAF Academy's Advanced Jet Training Squadron instructors, where cadets and young fighter pilots go through jet aircraft training. The Sherdils are responsible for preparing and performing formation aerobatics at national and international events.

== History ==
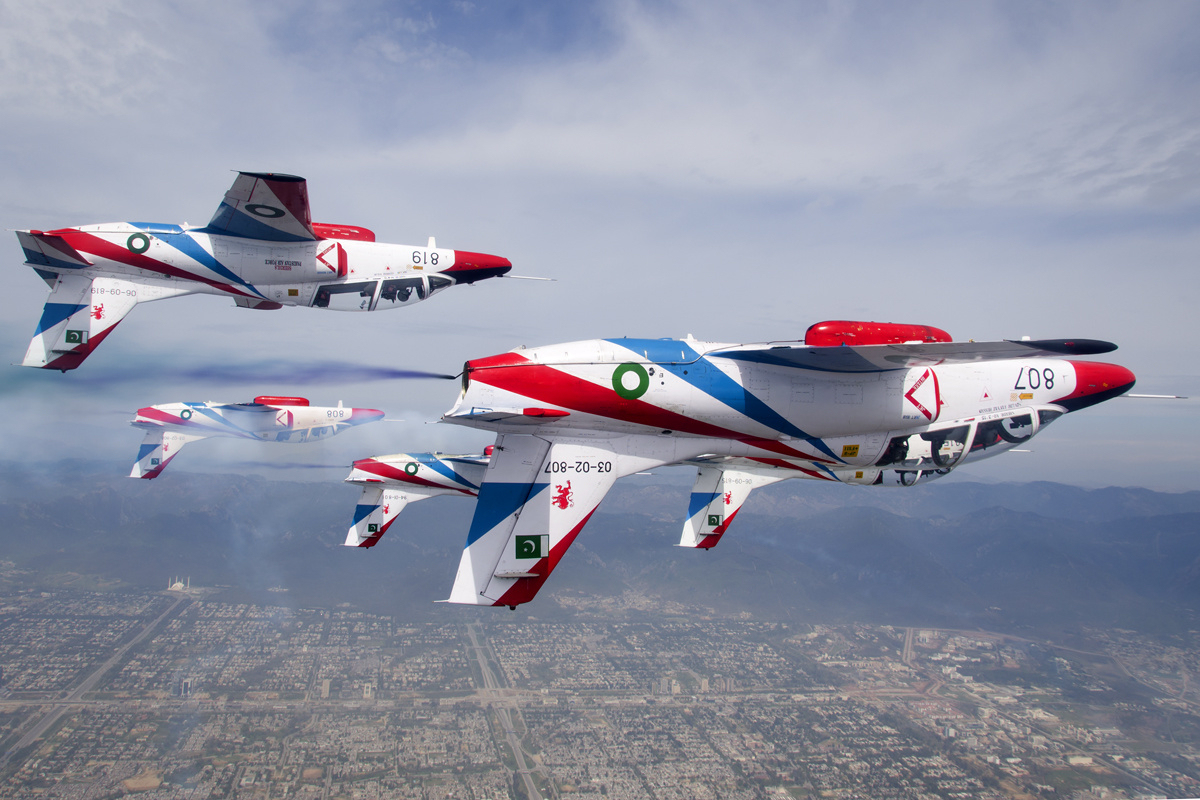
Sherdils over Islamabad.

The team was officially formed on August 17, 1972, by Bahar-ul-Haq, an academy instructor who was inspired by the Red Pelicans, which was the aerobatics team of the RAF College, Cranwell, where Bahar had attended an exchange tour. Bahar decided to put on a show during graduation to demonstrate the professional skills of the academy instructors and after several trials of candidate instructors, a team was formed under Wing Commander Imtiaz Bhatti using T-37 aircraft. The other members of the first team were Flight Lieutenant Aamer Ali Sharieff, Flight Lieutenant A Rahim Yusufzai, and Flight Lieutenant Niaz Nabi.

=== 1974 – 2004 (4-ship T-37 aircraft) ===
The debut performance of the team was highly successful, leading to more air shows for foreign dignitaries, heads of state, and military officers. Initially, the team had no name, flying as the "Sherdils" for the first time on September 19, 1974. The team was also known as the "Tweety Birds" after the T-37 "Tweets" they flew. Attempts were made to increase the number of aircraft in the team, but engine thrust demands were too much for the outer formation members. A four-aircraft diamond thus remained the basic formation of the Sherdils for almost three decades.

On 8 October, 1978, the Sherdils team experienced an accident during practice, resulting in the loss of one aircraft and its leader, Flight Lieutenant Alamdar. He was later awarded a posthumous Sitara-e-Basalat.

=== 2004 (6-ship and 9-ship T-37 aircraft) ===
In 2004, the number of aircraft in the primary formation was increased to six under the leadership of Wing Commander Tariq Chaudhary. The team was expanded to 9 aircraft on October 2, 2004, under the leadership of Wing Commander Vaqar Ali Qureshi, however the limited power of the T-37's engines caused difficulty with maintaining formation, especially for aircraft on the outside of the formation. The pioneer nine aircraft Sherdils team members were Wing Commander Vaqar (Leader), Flight Lieutenant Armughan (No. 2), Flight Lieutenant Nusrat (No. 3), Squadron leader Tariq Azeem (No. 4 slot/deputy leader), Sqn Leader Nasir (No. 5), Squadron Leader Sohail (No. 6), Squadron Leader Zahid (No. 7), Flight Lieutenant Hammad (No. 8), and Squadron Leader Tanveer (No. 9).

=== 2009 (4-ship K-8P aircraft) ===
In 2009, the Sherdils transitioned from T-37 to K-8 aircraft, which were jointly developed by Pakistan and China. A four-ship formation of K-8P aircraft performed for the first time in November 2009 at the PAF Academy Risalpur under the leadership of Squadron Leader Aamer Misbah Ahmad. The members of the first Sherdils K-8P squad were Squadron Leader Aamer Misbah Ahmad (Leader), No.2 Squadron Leader Nasir Zia (Right Wing), No.3 Squadron Leader Wajahat Syed (Left Wing), and No.4 Squadron Leader Khalid Matin (Slot Member).

Squadron Leader Aamer Misbah Ahmad became the pioneer of the Sherdils K-8P team. He singlehandedly led the successful conversion of the team from T-37 to K-8P without any incident despite much resistance from the T-37 team. Along with this, he was the Flight Commander of the Advanced Jet Training Squadron (AJTS) in parallel and was responsible for training new pilots at the PAF Asghar Khan Academy in Risalpur.

=== 2010 and 2011 (9-ship K-8P aircraft) ===
By the spring of 2010, the Sherdils had transitioned from four aircraft to seven aircraft. This new configuration was performed at an air display for the closing ceremony of Exercise High-Mark 2010, at Thal, under the leadership of Wing Commander Syed Ali Zaidi. Soon after, the number of aircraft was increased to nine, and the team performed at the graduation ceremony in May 2010. In October 2010, led by Squadron Leader Khalid Matin, the 9-ship Sherdils performed at an air display for a graduation ceremony at Risalpur.

On November 16, 2010, the Sherdils team performed at the 8th China International Aviation & Aerospace Exhibition in Zhuhai, Guangdong, China.

In 2011, the team prepared for the Turkish Air Show at Izmir, but the plan was canceled before they departed. Since then, the Sherdils have performed air displays at the PAF Academy graduation ceremonies, Pakistan Day Parades, various Pakistan Independence Day celebrations at Sea-View Karachi, and in other national and international events.

=== 2017 to current (New Livery and Aerobatics Sequence) ===
On August 14, 2017, the team revealed the new livery for the Sherdil jets at an air display held in Islamabad for the country's 70th Independence Day celebrations. The fuselage is white with a green stripe running from nose to tail, with an all-green vertical stabilizer with a large crescent and star on the tail, because of the aerobatics, a large crescent and star is also painted on the underside of the aircraft. At the same time, there were significant improvements in smoke appearance and persistence. The Sherdil air displays added commentary and music for the audience for the first time as well as updating their display sequence.

=== Sherdils Aircraft Paint Scheme ===
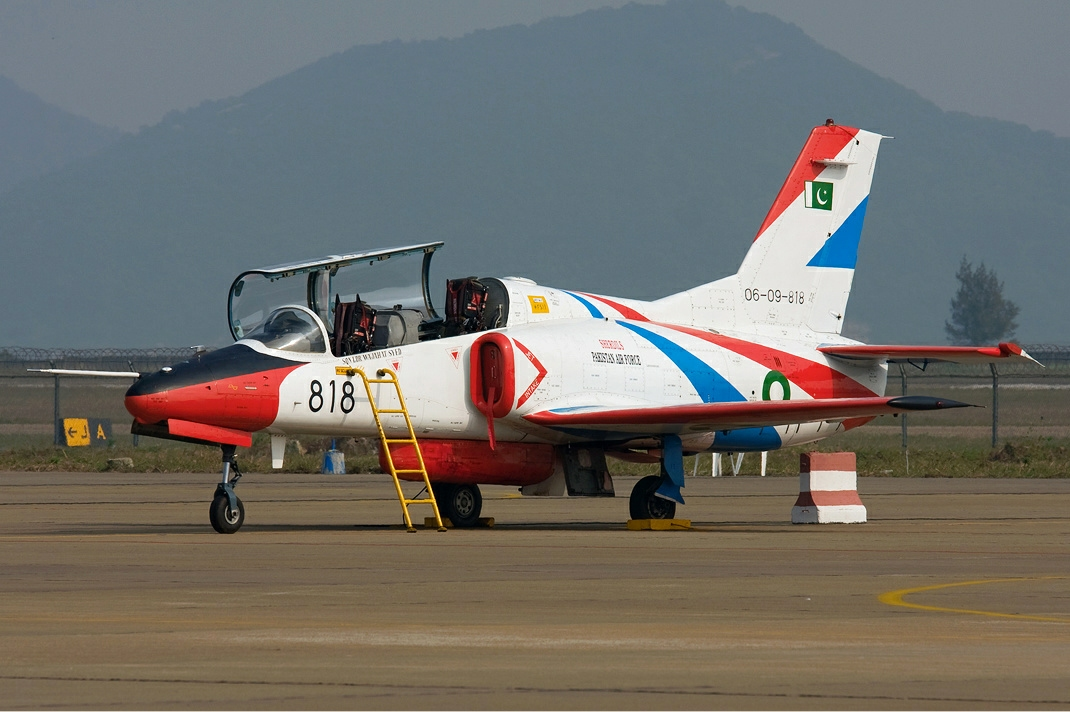
Sherdils K-8P in Jordan.

To improve the appearance of display aircraft, the T-37s were initially painted red. However, maintaining these aircraft, without the expensive polyurethane coating, became challenging. As a result, the team switched back to an all-metal finish, with only the nose, wing tips, and tail painted in day-glow orange. In 1980, six ex-USAF T-37s, coated in all-white polyurethane, were added to the fleet. A sunburst paint scheme was implemented, featuring red rays on a white background. Later, the aircraft were repainted red, with the rays in white. Similarly, the K-8P jets were given an overall white color scheme adorned with red and blue stripes.

== See also ==
- Pakistan Air Force Academy
- Aerobatics
