= Hongdu JL-8 =

Chinese/Pakistani jet trainer aircraft

Hongdu JL-8 / K-8
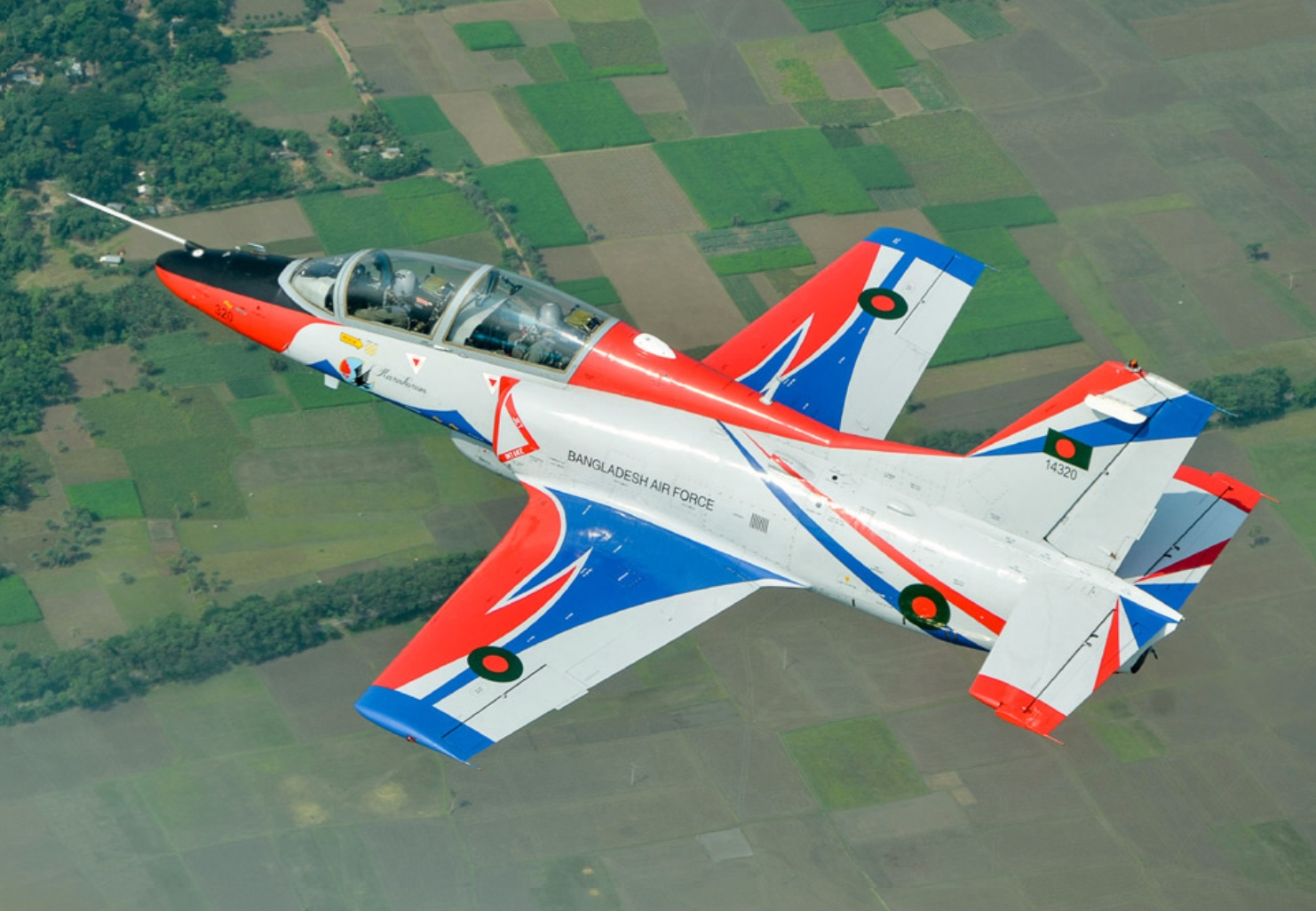
- K-8 of the Bangladesh Air Force

General information
- Type: Jet trainer Light attack
- National origin: China; Pakistan
- Manufacturer: Hongdu Aviation Industry Corporation; Pakistan Aeronautical Complex
- Status: In service
- Primary users: PLA Air Force Pakistan Air Force; Egyptian Air Force; Myanmar Air Force; Bangladesh Air Force
- Number built: 735+

History
- Manufactured: 1990–2020
- Introduction date: 21 September 1994
- First flight: 21 November 1990

The Hongdu JL-8 (Nanchang JL-8), also known as the Karakorum-8 or K-8 for short, is a two-seat intermediate jet trainer and light attack aircraft designed by China Nanchang Aircraft Manufacturing Corporation and Pakistan Aeronautical Complex. The primary contractor is the Hongdu Aviation Industry Corporation.

== Development ==
The JL-8 trainer was proposed as a joint cooperation effort between the governments of Pakistan and the People's Republic of China in 1986. The name was changed on the suggestion of Pakistan's President Zia ul Haq to Karakoram-8 to represent the friendship between the two countries. Work on the design started in 1987 at Nanchang Aircraft Manufacturing Company (NAMC) at Nanchang, Jiangshi Province in South Central China. The Chinese chief designer of the aircraft was Shi Ping (石屏), heading a team of over 100 Chinese Engineers, while Air Cdr Muhammad Younas Tbt (M), SI(M) was the chief designer from the Pakistani side leading a team of over 20 Pakistani engineers.

Initially, the aircraft was going to use many parts manufactured in the United States, including the Garrett TFE731 engine and several cockpit displays, and communication and avionics systems, but due to political developments and an embargo from the US at the end of the 1980s following the Tiananmen Square protests of 1989, other suppliers had to be used. The first prototype was built in 1989, with the first flight taking place on 21 November 1990, piloted by Chief Test Pilot Col Yang Yao (杨耀). Flight testing continued from 1991 to 1993 by a Flight Test Team consisting of four Chinese and two Pakistani pilots.

After four prototypes were built, production of a small batch of 24 aircraft was launched in 1992. The Chinese share out of these was 18, while the Pakistan Air Force (PAF) received six K-8s in 1994. In 1995, the PAF decided to order 75 more K-8s to gradually replace its fleet of Cessna T-37 Tweet basic trainers. In 2010, the number of K-8 aircraft in the PAF inventory was estimated to be around 40. The People's Liberation Army Air Force (PLAAF) received its first six JL-8 trainers in 1995 following additional upgrades. The Chinese model uses a Chinese-manufactured version of the Ukrainian Ivchenko AI-25 (DV-2) engine, designated WS-11. The PLAAF is anticipated to continue adding the JL-8 trainer to its fleet to replace its obsolete trainers, such as the Chengdu JJ-5. In 2008, the number of JL-8s in PLAAF inventory was estimated to be over 120 aircraft.

Other countries have shown interest in the trainer, and it now also serves in the air forces of Egypt, Sri Lanka and Zimbabwe. While the type primarily serves as a basic and advanced trainer, it can also be used in the close air support or even air combat role when appropriately armed.

The export-variant K-8 Karakorum Basic Common Advanced Jet Trainer is co-produced by China National Aero-Technology Import & Export Corporation (CATIC) for export markets other than Pakistan, while later aircraft for Pakistan have been built by the Aircraft Manufacturing Factory (AMF), Pakistan Aeronautical Complex. The latest export variant is the K-8P version, which is operated by the PAF. The K-8P has an advanced avionics package of integrated head-up display (HUD), multi-function displays (MFDs) and comes equipped with MFD-integrated GPS and ILS/TACAN systems. It also has hardpoints for carrying a variety of training and operational bombs up to 250 kg, pod-mounted 23 mm cannon, and PL-5 / 7 /AIM-9 P launchers. In September 2011, NAMC produced another 12 K-8Ps for an undisclosed foreign client.

In 2008 Venezuela announced the purchase of 18 K-8 aircraft. The K-8 has been marketed by China to the air forces of the Philippines, and to Indonesia, as a replacement for Indonesia's BAE Hawk jet trainers. In 2009, the Bolivian government approved a deal to purchase 6 K-8P aircraft for use in anti-drug operations. In 2010 the total number of K-8 aircraft produced in all variants was estimated to be more than 500, with a continual production rate of approximately 24 aircraft per year.

== Design ==
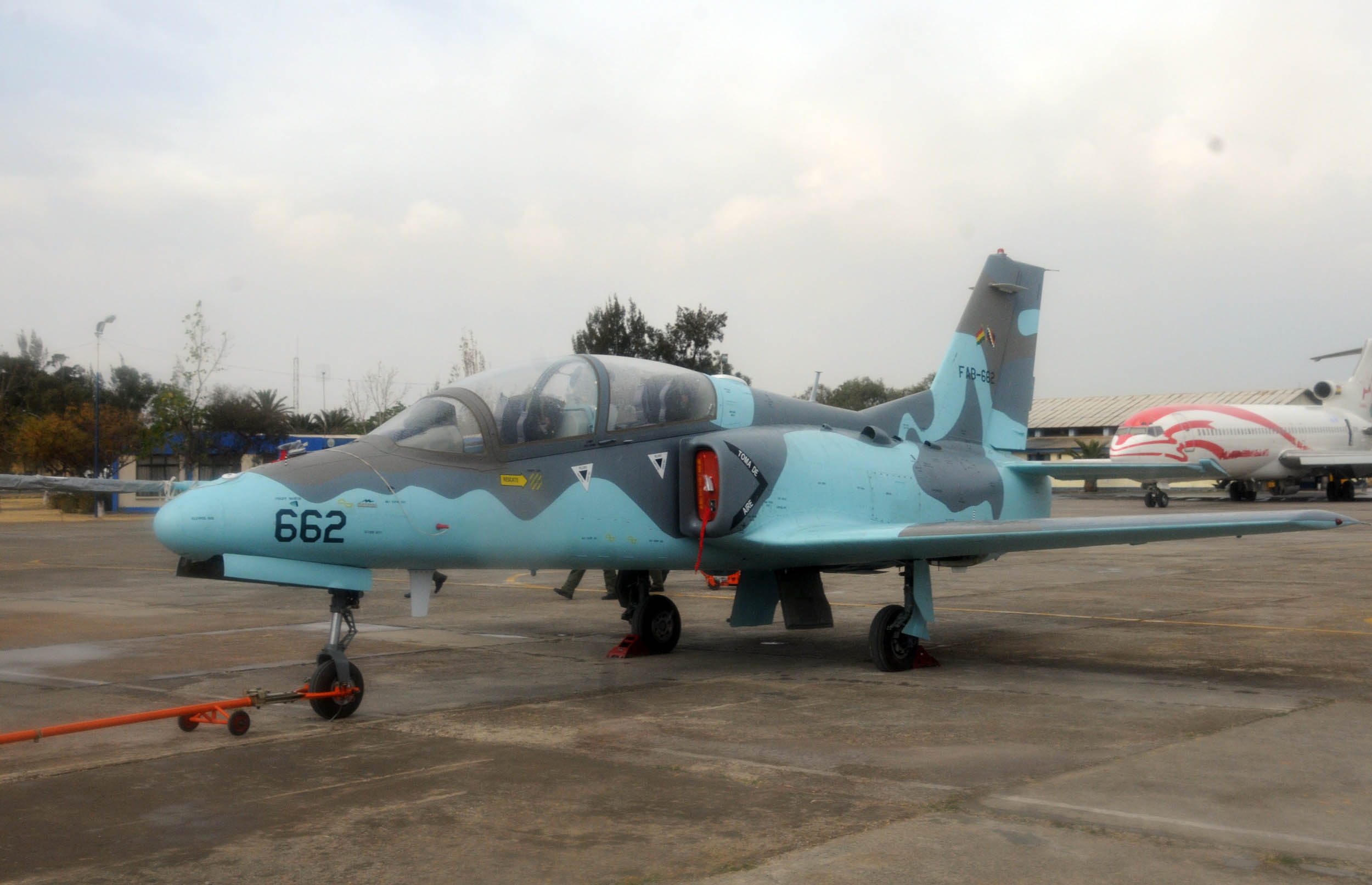
A K-8 of the Bolivian Air Force.

The JL-8 / K-8 has a multi-role capability for training and, with little modification, can also be used for airfield defense. The aircraft is supposed to be as cost-effective as possible, with a short turn-around time and low maintenance requirements. The JL-8 for the domestic Chinese market and its export variants, K-8E and K-8P, have different powerplants and avionics.

=== Airframe and flight control system ===
A low-wing monoplane design primarily constructed of aluminum alloys, the JL-8 / K-8 airframe structure is designed for an 8,000 flight hour service life.

The landing gear is of tricycle configuration, with hydraulically operated wheel brakes and nose-wheel steering.

The flight control system operates a set of conventional flight control surfaces with a rigid push-rod transmission system, which itself is electrically or hydraulically operated. The aileron control system, of irreversible servo-control type, is composed of a hydraulic booster, an artificial-feel device, a feel trim actuator and a rigid push-rod transmission mechanism. The elevator and rudder control systems are of reversible push-rod type.

=== Cockpit and avionics ===
The JL-8 / K-8 cockpit arrangement is designed to be as close to that of a combat aircraft as possible. A transparent plastic canopy covering both cockpits, which are arranged in a tandem seating position, is supposed to give a good all-round field of view.

A Rockwell Collins Electronic Flight Instrument System (EFIS) is fitted, with multi-function displays (MFDs) in the front and rear cockpits showing information to the pilots. The emergency cockpit escape system is made up of two Martin-Baker MK-10L rocket-assisted ejection seats which are zero-zero capable, meaning they can be used safely at zero altitude and zero speed. Although JL-8 is designed to have limited capability to deliver air-to-ground weapons, the first rocket attack practice was only completed in May 2011.

Ultra high frequency (UHF) and very high frequency (VHF) radio communication systems are present, along with a Tactical Air Navigation (TACAN) and automatic direction finder (ADF). An instrument landing system (ILS) is also available. These systems can be tailored to meet the requirements of the customer.

A strap-on Environmental control system (ECS) from AlliedSignal provides air conditioning to the cockpit. It is capable of operating when the aircraft is on the ground, under ambient temperatures of -40 to +52 °C, as well as in the air.

=== Propulsion and fuel system ===
The JL-8, for the Chinese domestic market, was originally powered by the Ukrainian Ivchenko-Progress AI-25TLK turbofan jet engine with 16.9 kN of thrust, but this has been replaced by the WS-11, the Chinese-manufactured version of the AI-25TLK. Export variants (K-8P, K-8E) use the lower-thrust (15.6 kN) Honeywell TFE731-2A-2A modular turbofan, which has digital electronic engine control (DEEC), provided the US government approves sale of the engine to the customer.

A hydro-mechanical fuel control system delivers fuel to the engine. The aircraft's fuel system consists of the fuel tanks and the fuel supply/transfer, vent/pressurization, fuel quantity measuring/indicating, fuel refueling and fuel drain subsystems. The total fuel is contained in two fuselage bladder-type rubber tanks and a wing integral tank of 1720 lb. The capacity of each drop tank is 250 litres.

== Operational history ==
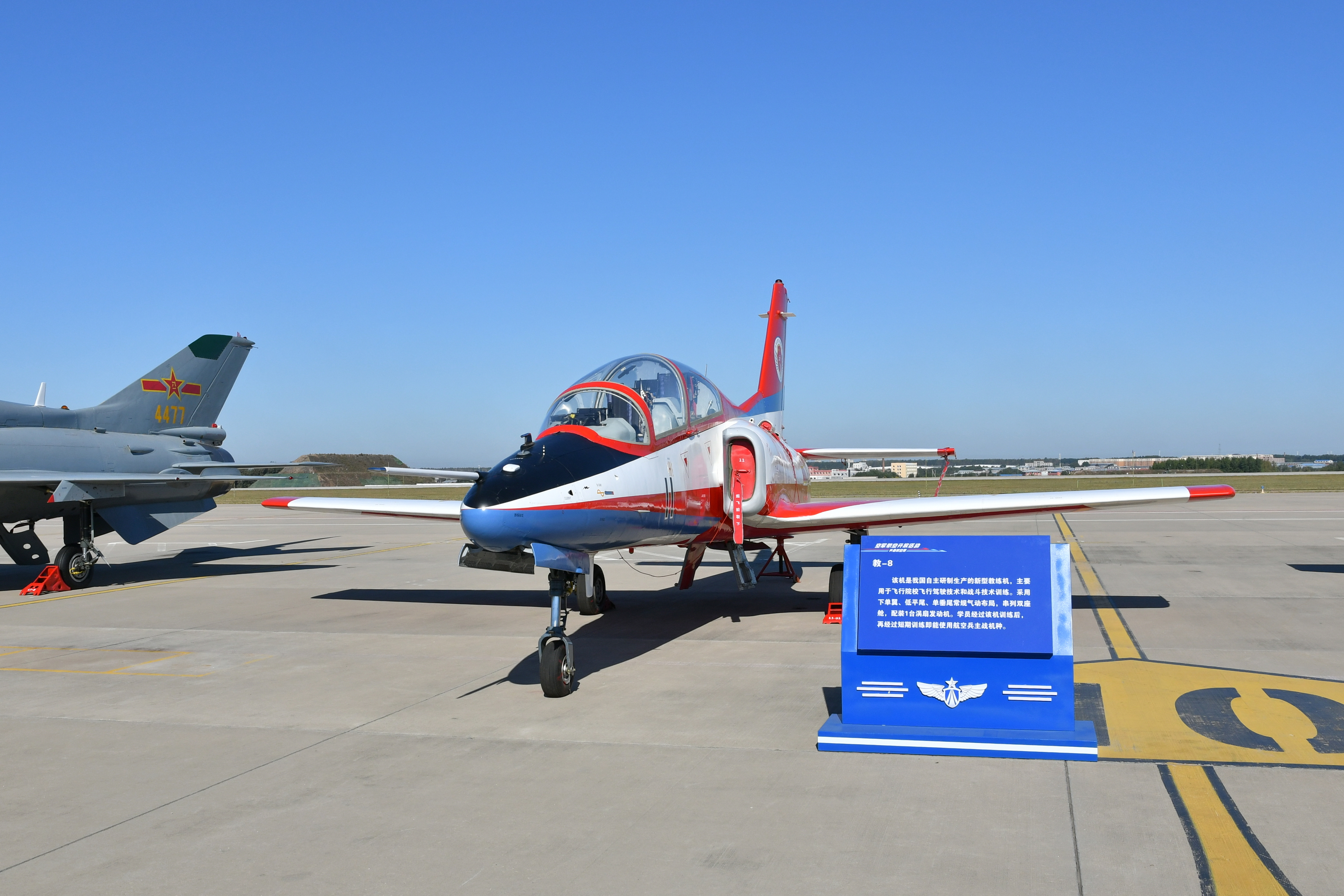
PLAAF JL-8

The K-8 took part in its first aerial display in 1993 at the Singapore Air Show and since then has participated at Air Shows at numerous places including Dubai, Paris, Farnborough, Bangkok, Zhuhai etc. It was shown to the Pakistani public for the first time on 23 March 1994 at the Pakistan Day Parade. It became part of the Sherdils (Lion Hearts) aerobatics team of the Pakistan Air Force in 2009 and carried out its first public display on 6 April 2010. K-8 replaced the team's previous T-37 Tweet aircraft. On May 25, 2024, the PLAAF Shijiazhuang Flying College finished their last training lessons with the JL-8, ending the Shijiazhuang Flying College's use of the JL-8.

=== Myanmar ===
In late December 2012 and early January 2013, during the Kachin conflict, K-8s of the Myanmar Air Force were used to strike Kachin Independence Army positions in the north of the country. On 30 June 2023 a K-8 W was destroyed while attacking opposition groups. On 11 November 2023 KNDF and People Defense Forces shot down a K8W at Loikaw, Karenni State with a 0.5 machine gun and it crashed into Than Daung Township in Karen State.

=== Venezuela ===
In a video which was surfaced online on various social media platforms, showed a Venezuelan air force K-8 attacking a cartel Piper Cherokee with its gun pods. The event occurred in late 2022 and the video was recorded from a nearby Oil tanker. The K-8 reportedly shot down the cartel aircraft, if true it would be the K-8s first air to air kill. Though this event still remains unverified

=== Potential Operators ===
==== Kazakhstan ====
It was reported in late August 2026 that Kazspecexport, an agency of Kazakhstan, was in talks with State owned CATIC (China National Aero-Technology Import and Export Corporation) to acquire transport aircraft and up to six K-8 trainers for the Kazakh Airforce. The agreement stipulates a full delivery within 26 months and a completion of factory certification of 18 months. Kazakhstan had previously considered Russian Yak-130s.

== Accidents and incidents ==
- 25 May 2015: A Pakistan Air Force K-8 crashed while on a training mission near Swabi, Khyber Pakhtunkhwa. Both pilots ejected safely.
- 24 March 2021: A Bolivian Air Force (FAB) K-8VB with tail number FAB-663 crashed into a house in Sacaba, Bolivia, killing a woman in her house around 9:30 local time during a training mission. Both crew members survived after ejecting from the aircraft.
- 18 June 2022: A Venezuelan Air Force (Aviación Militar Bolivariana AMB) K-8W with tail number 2702 crashed at Los Cortijos in the state of Zulia. Both occupants ejected to safety.
- 11 November 2023: A Myanmar Air Force jet crashed in Hpruso Township, Karenni State. Both pilots ejected safely. The air force stated the aircraft suffered a technical problem, while an insurgent group, in conflict with the Myanmar junta, reported it had shot down the jet.
- 7 January 2025: A Pakistan Air Force K-8P crashed near Pakistan Air Force Academy, Risalpur. The pilot Sqn Ldr Muhammad Ahmed Mian was not able to eject and was killed. The crash was reported to be due to a technical malfunction.
- 6 February 2025: A K-8 of the Air Force of Zimbabwe crashed in the Guinea Fowl area in Gweru. The sole pilot on board died in the accident.
- 21 March 2025: A Sri Lanka Air Force K-8 trainer aircraft crashed near Minuwangete in the Wariyapola area. Both pilots ejected safely and were uninjured.

== Variants ==
Data from: SinoDefence.com

- K-8

Original variant powered by the Garrett TFE731-2A turbofan engine.

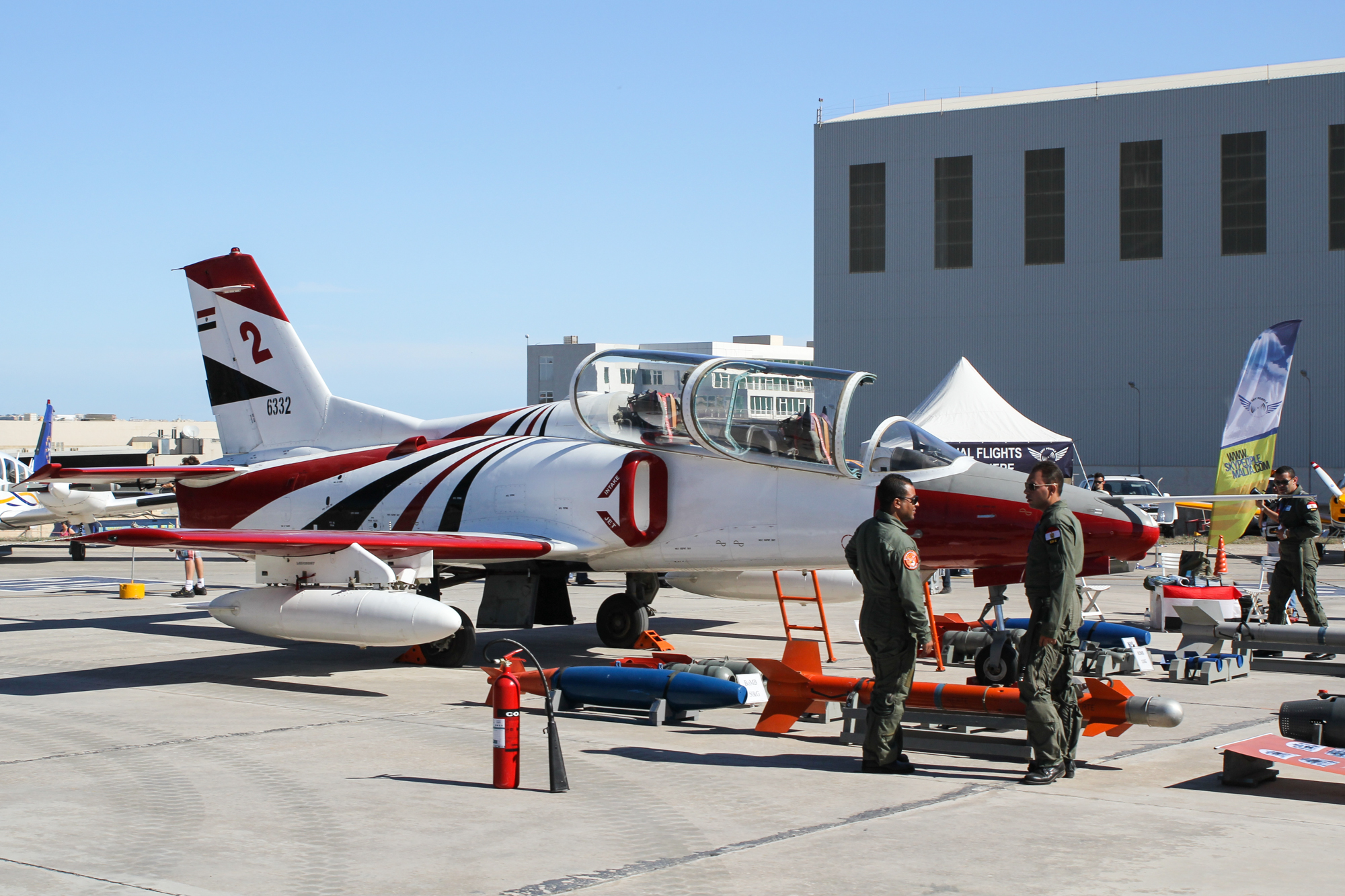
Egyptian Air Force K-8E on display at the 2015 Malta International Airshow

- K-8E

K-8 variant developed for export to Egypt in 1999, featuring 33 modifications to the airframe and avionics. Built in Egypt from Chinese-supplied kits, production of 80 Egyptian-built Chinese kits was completed in 2005, with license production of an additional 40 K-8Es undertaken thereafter.

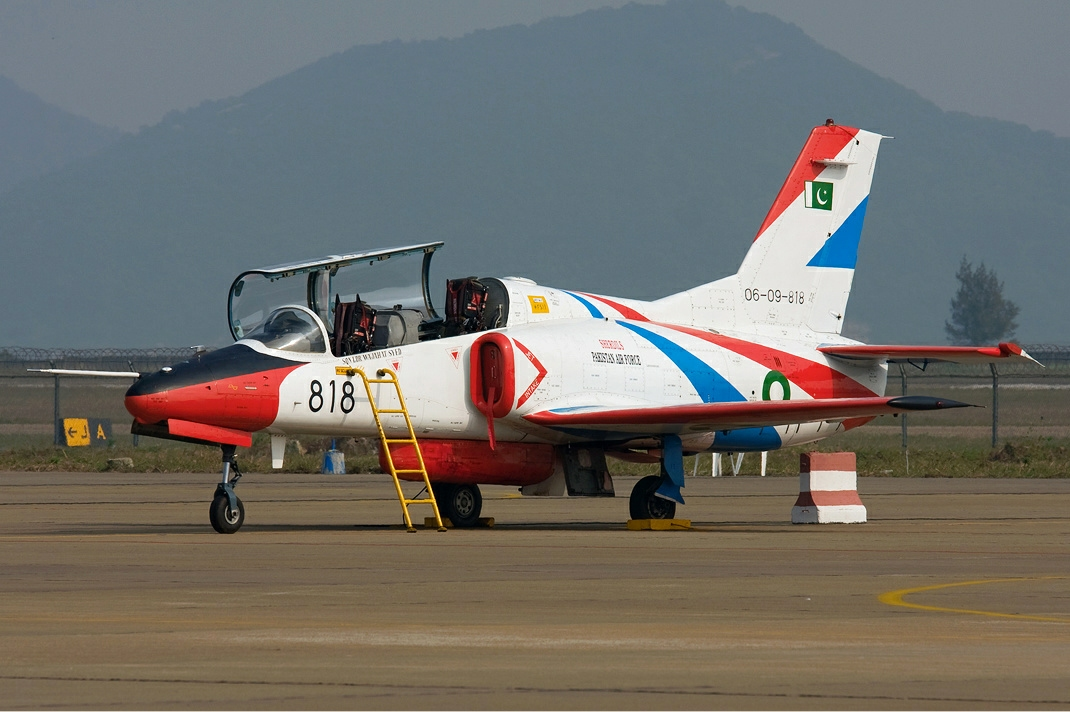
Pakistan Air Force K-8P belonging to the Sherdils aerobatics team.

- K-8P

Pakistan-specific variant with new avionics, glass cockpit and Martin-Baker Zero-Zero ejection seats.

- K-8V

An 'integrated flight test simulation aircraft' (IFTSA), equipped with an advanced flight control computer and analogue fly-by-wire (FBW) system which can mimic the aerodynamic characteristics and flight profile of other aircraft. Used primarily to test aircraft designs before prototypes are built and tested.

- JL-8

PLAAF-specific variant powered by the Ivchenko AI-25 TLK turbofan and featuring Chinese avionics suite. First flew in December 1994, 6 aircraft delivered to PLAAF in June 1998.

- L-11

Variant of JL-8 powered by the WS-11 turbofan (Ivchenko AI-25 TLK produced under license in China). Approximately 100 aircraft delivered to PLAAF.

- JL-8W (K-8W)

Variant of the JL-8 with improved cockpit and HUD. Delivered to Venezuela's Bolivarian Military Aviation 13 March 2010, with no U.S.-controlled parts. Total order 18 aircraft (+ 40 announced). 16 delivered to Bangladesh Air Force, one crashed in 2018.40+ in service Myanmar Air Force

- JL-8VB (K-8VB)

Variant similar to JL-8W; for export to Bolivian Air Force, with no U.S.-controlled parts. Total order 6 aircraft (+ 12 announced).

- K-8NG (Next Generation)

Recently at the 2021 Dubai Air Show, a modernization of the K-8 Karakorum training platform called K-8NG was presented. K-8NG is a multi-role jet trainer with basic/advanced training, air-to-ground precision strike, and reconnaissance capabilities.

== Operators ==
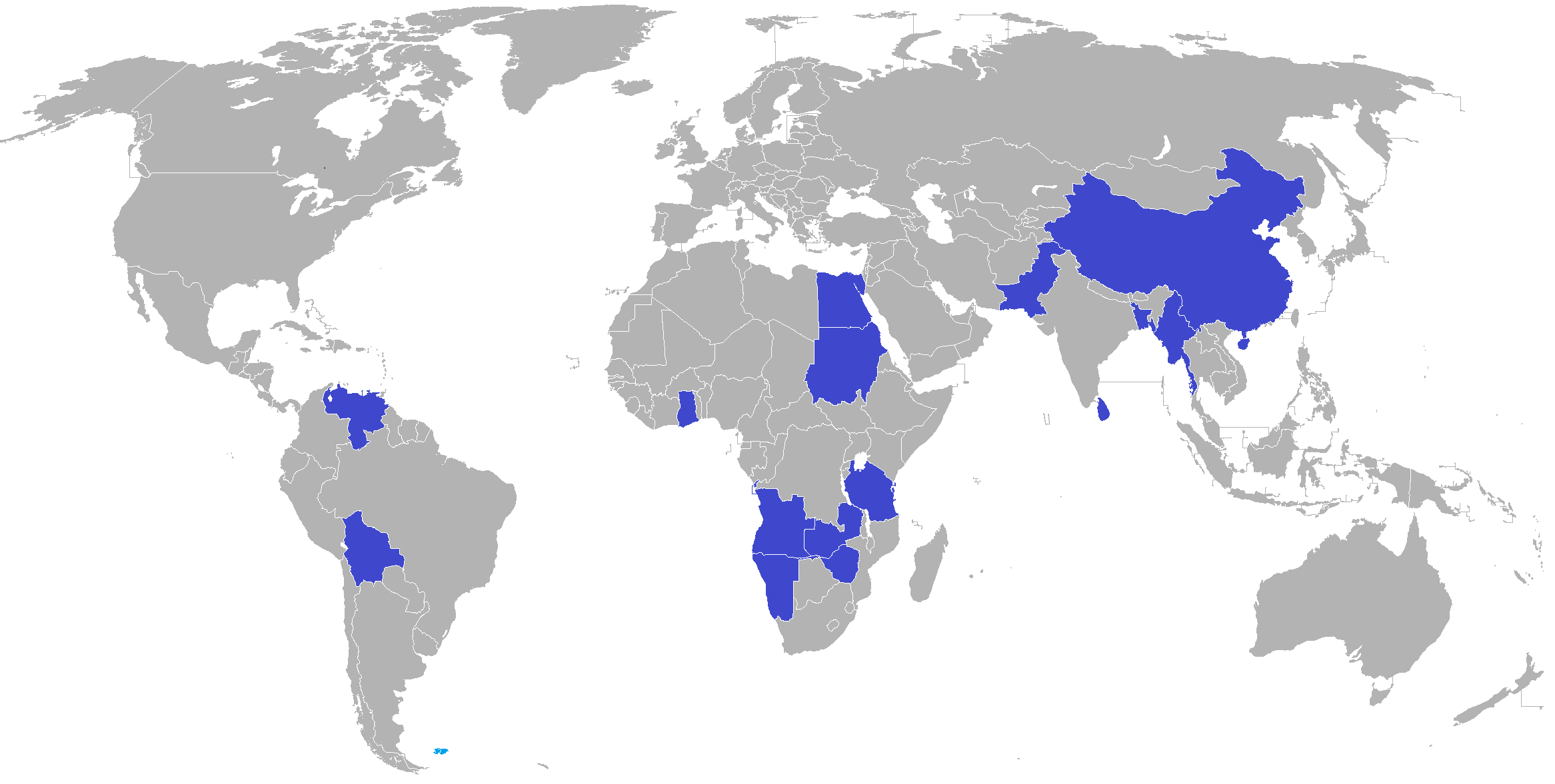
Main operating countries of the Chinese K-8 "Karakorum" aircraft in the world.

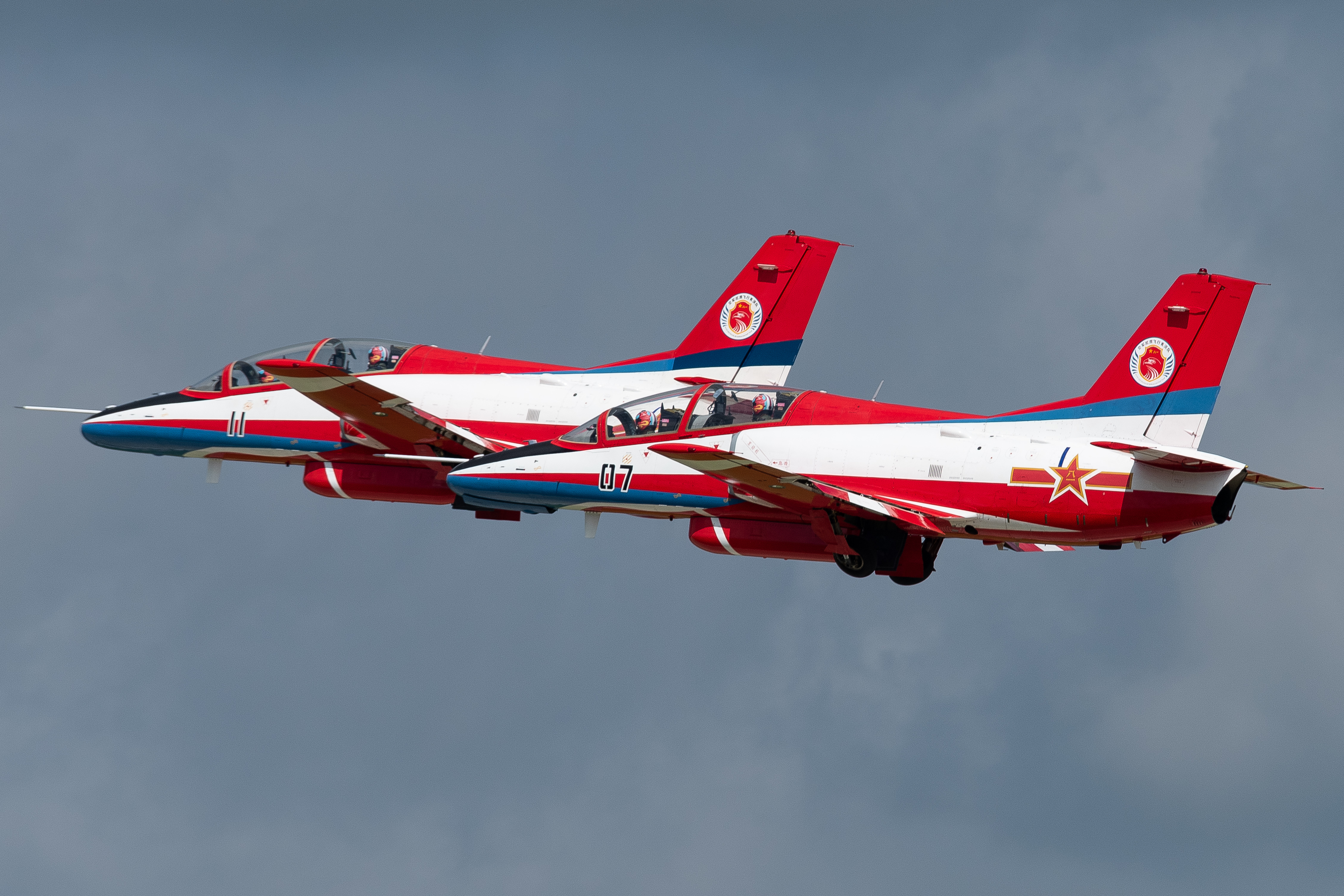
Two PLA Air Force JL-8s from the Red Falcon display team taking off at Changchun Airshow, China

=== Current ===
Angola

- National Air Force of Angola

Bangladesh

- Bangladesh Air Force

Bolivia

- Bolivian Air Force

China

- People's Liberation Army Air Force - 350
  - Shijiazhuang Flying College - Retired in 2024
- People's Liberation Army Naval Air Force - 16

Egypt

- Egyptian Air Force

Ghana

- Ghana Air Force

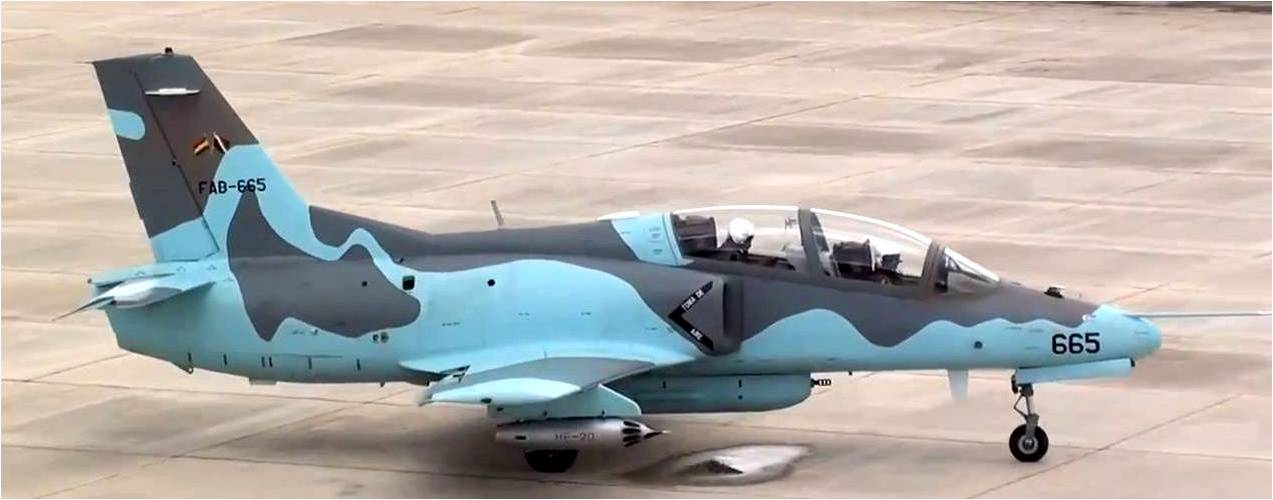
A K-8 of the Bolivian Air Force.

Laos

- Lao People's Liberation Army Air Force - 4 k-8

Myanmar

- Myanmar Air Force

Namibia

- Namibian Air Force

Pakistan

- Pakistan Air Force

Sri Lanka

- Sri Lanka Air Force

Sudan

- Sudanese Air Force

Venezuela

- Venezuelan Air Force

Zambia

- Zambian Air Force

Zimbabwe

- Air Force of Zimbabwe

== Specifications (K-8) ==
Data from Pakistan Aeronautical Complex Kamra - Karakoram-8 (K-8) Aircraft, Jane's Aircraft Recognition Guide

General characteristics

- Crew: 2
- Length: 11.6 m (38 ft 1 in)
- Wingspan: 9.63 m (31 ft 7 in)
- Height: 4.1 m (13 ft 5 in)
- Empty weight: 2,687 kg (5,924 lb)
- Max takeoff weight: 4,330 kg (9,546 lb)
- Powerplant: 1 × Ivchenko AI-25TLK turbofan engine, 16.9 kN (3,800 lbf) thrust

Performance

- Maximum speed: 800 km/h (500 mph, 430 kn)
- Maximum speed: Mach 0.75
- Range: 2,250 km (1,400 mi, 1,210 nmi)
- Service ceiling: 13,000 m (43,000 ft)
- g limits: +7.33 -3.0
- Wing loading: 254.40 kg/m^{2} (52.11 lb/sq ft)

Armament

- Guns: 1× 23 mm cannon pod (mounted on centreline hardpoint)
- Hardpoints: Up to 5 hardpoints (varies on variants), total capacity 1,000 kg (2,205 lb) external fuel and ordnance:
  - 4× under-wing, capacity 250 kg each
  - 1× under-fuselage (23 mm cannon pod mount)
- Rockets: 57 mm unguided rocket pods, capacity 24 rounds (2 x pods with 12 rounds each)
- Air-to-air missiles: PL-5, PL-7
- Air-to-ground missiles: TL-10, TL-20, YJ-9E (Anti ship). NG Version only.
- Bombs: 200 kg, 250 kg unguided bomb. 50 kg, 100 kg Laser guided bomb. NG Version only.
- Others:
  - 2× 80 US gal (300 L) fuel drop-tanks mounted on outboard under-wing hardpoints

Avionics

- EFIS
- Targeting POD for laser guided bombs and air-to-ground missiles. NG Version only.
- Passive Jamming POD. NG Version only.

== See also ==
- Trainer (aircraft)
- Jet trainer

Aircraft of comparable role, configuration, and era

- Aero L-39 Albatros / Aero L-159 Alca / Aero L-39NG
- BAE Hawk
- HAL HJT-36 Yashas
- CASA C-101 Aviojet
- Dassault/Dornier Alpha Jet
- G-4 Super Galeb
- IAR 99
- PZL I-22 Iryda
- Aermacchi MB-339
- Mitsubishi T-2
- MiG-AT
- Yak-130
- AIDC AT-3
