= Skipton Climo =

British Indian Army general (1868–1937)

Lieutenant-General Sir Skipton Climo KCB DSO
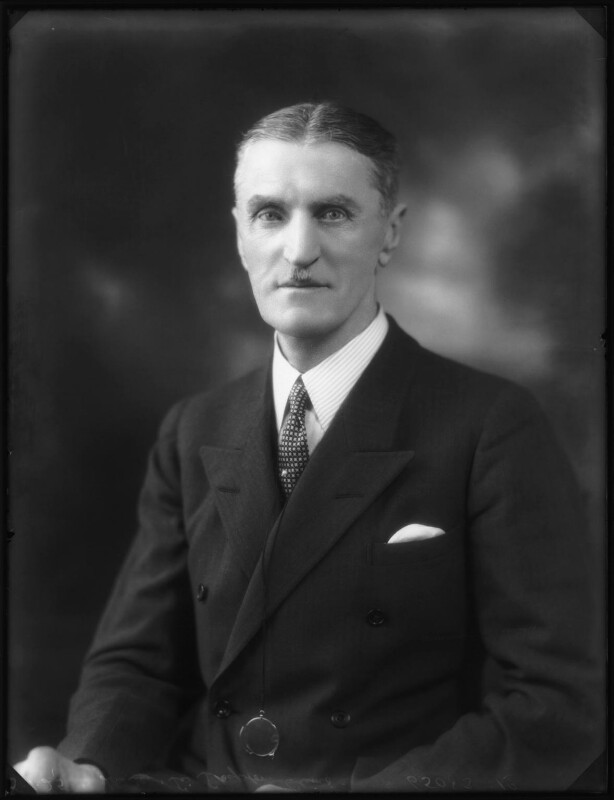
- Climo in 1925
- Born: 24 December 1868; Longford, Ireland
- Died: 31 March 1937 (aged 68); Folkestone, Kent, England
- Military career
- Allegiance: United Kingdom
- Branch: British Army; British Indian Army
- Service years: 1888–1923
- Rank: Lieutenant-General
- Unit: Border Regiment
- Commands: Poona District (1920–22); Waziristan Force (1919–20); 3rd Indian Brigade 1919); Nowshera Brigade (1917–18); 24th Punjabis (1912–15)
- Conflicts: North-West Frontier; Siege of Malakand; Mohmand campaign of 1897–98; Boxer Rebellion; Battle of Peking; Battle of Peitsang; Battle of Yangcun; British expedition to Tibet; First World War; Mesopotamian campaign; Battle of Shaiba; Battle of Nasiriyah; Battle of Ctesiphon; Third Anglo-Afghan War; Waziristan campaign
- Awards: Knight Commander of the Order of the Bath; Distinguished Service Order; Mentioned in Despatches (5); Commander of the Order of the Nile (Egypt)

Lieutenant-General Sir Skipton Hill Climo, KCB, DSO (24 December 1868 − 31 March 1937) was a British officer of the Indian Army. He was awarded the Distinguished Service Order for his actions during the Mohmand campaign of 1897–98. After serving in China, Climo commanded Indian troops during the First World War. He eventually assumed command of the Indian Army forces during the Waziristan campaign. After serving as the General Officer Commanding of the Poona District, Climo retired to Britain.

== Early life ==
Climo was born in Longford, the son of Colonel William Hill Climo (1838–1919) of the Army Medical Service and his wife Margaret (1843/4−1922). He was educated at Shrewsbury School and the Royal Military College, Sandhurst, and in February 1888 was commissioned as a second lieutenant in the 2nd Battalion, Border Regiment.

== Military career ==
In July 1889, while serving with the 1st Battalion in India, he was promoted lieutenant, and two months later transferred to the Indian Army and joined the 24th Punjabis, which became the 4th Battalion, 14th Punjab Regiment in 1922.

In 1897–1898, Climo served with the battalion at the siege of Malakand and the relief of Chakdara and the subsequent operations during the Mohmand campaign on the North-West Frontier. For these operations, he was mentioned in despatches, awarded the Distinguished Service Order (DSO) in May 1898, which was awarded personally by Queen Victoria on 17 November 1898, and in February 1899 promoted captain and brevet major.

In 1900, Climo accompanied his battalion to China to help put down the Boxer Rebellion, and fought at the relief of Peking and the battles of Peitsang and Yangtsun, being again mentioned in despatches in January 1901. He was second-in-command of his battalion during the British expedition to Tibet in 1903–1904 and in February 1905 was promoted to the substantive rank of major. In 1908, he served in the Mohmand expedition on the North-West Frontier and in the engagement at Kargha in May, and was mentioned in despatches for a third time in June 1908. On 22 June 1911, he was one of the Indian Army officers selected to represent the force at the coronation of King George V. In February 1912, he was promoted lieutenant-colonel and took command of the 24th Punjabis.

At the outbreak of the First World War in 1914, the battalion was posted to Egypt with Indian Expeditionary Force F to help defend the Suez Canal, and in 1915 was sent to Mesopotamia, where it fought at the Battle of Shaiba on 12–14 April. At the end of May, Climo was given temporary command of the 17th Indian Brigade and led the main assault in the so-called "regatta", in which a fleet of small boats was used to advance up the Tigris and capture Amarah. He then commanded his battalion at the battle of Nasiriyah in June–July 1915, and commanded the 30th Indian Brigade at the Battle of Kut al Amara in September 1915 and the Battle of Ctesiphon in November 1915, where he was severely wounded on 22 November while commanding the brigade in the successful assault on the "Vital Point" redoubt, being hit twice in the leg and then again as he was being evacuated on a stretcher. He was promoted to brevet colonel in October 1915, again mentioned in despatches in January 1916, appointed Companion of the Order of the Bath (CB) in June 1916, and awarded the Order of the Nile 3rd class by the Sultan of Egypt in November 1916.

After recovering from his wounds, Climo served as a temporary brigadier-general and brigade commander from January to April 1916, commanded the Nowshera Brigade in India, again as temporary brigadier-general, from May 1917 and was promoted major-general in June 1918. In 1919, he commanded the 3rd Indian Brigade during the Third Anglo-Afghan War. In May 1919, he was given command of the Waziristan Force, which successfully subdued the Tochi Wazirs. For this, he was once again mentioned in despatches in December 1920, and appointed Knight Commander of the Order of the Bath (KCB) on 1 August 1920.

General Sir Charles Monro, the Commander-in-Chief, India, wrote of him:

Major-General S. H. Climo, C.B., D.S.O., commanded the Waziristan Field Force to my entire satisfaction. In every theatre of war in which he has been employed he has proved himself to be an exceptionally able and resolute commander, and especially so in this arduous campaign, which has demanded the highest qualities of leadership. His knowledge of frontier warfare and the best means of dealing satisfactorily with the complex problems created thereby has been most marked. His extensive acquaintance of administrative detail enabled him to provide successfully for the comfort and health of his troops. This was especially noticeable on the Lines of Communication, where the provision of Rest Camps, wherein the sick were attended to and relieving troops provided with ample food and shelter, largely contributed to the efficiency of the Force and the success of the operation.

He then held the temporary rank of lieutenant-general while retaining command of the Waziristan Force until May 1920 and was appointed general officer commanding (GOC) Poona District in June 1920. He was promoted to the substantive rank of lieutenant-general in June 1921, but was placed on the unemployed list in December 1922, returning to Britain and settling in Folkestone. He retired in 1923 and was granted an Indian Good Service Pension. He served as colonel of the 4/14th Punjab Regiment during his retirement.

== Personal life ==
He married Ethel Bessie Mann (1893–1974), 25 years his junior, on 15 April 1925; they had no children. The couple also owned the Villa La Madeleine in Cannes, where they spent the winter and were members of the exclusive Cercle Nautique club.

Climo was also president of the Cannes branch of the Royal British Legion in 1931.

During his army days, Climo had been one of the best polo players in the Indian Army. He was also a keen golfer and fisherman and a close friend of General Sir Andrew Skeen since his early days in India.

He died at his home at 7 Godwyn Gardens, Folkestone, on 31 March 1937 after a short illness and was buried in the garrison churchyard of nearby Shorncliffe Garrison after a military funeral.
