= List of Waziristan Campaign Victoria Cross recipients =

The following is a list of Victoria Cross recipients during the Waziristan Campaign in northwest British India (now Pakistan) during the 1920s.

== Captain Ishar Singh ==
Ishar Singh (13 December 1895 – 2 December 1963).

Ishar Singh was 25 years old, and a Sepoy in the 28th Punjab Regiment, Indian Army during the Waziristan Campaign, when the following deed took place for which he was awarded the VC:

For most conspicuous bravery and devotion to duty on 10 April 1921, near Haidari Kach (Waziristan). When the convoy protection troops were attacked, this Sepoy was No. 1 of a Lewis Gun Section. Early in the action he received a very severe gunshot wound in the chest, and fell beside his Lewis gun. Hand-to-hand fighting having commenced, the British officer, Indian officer, and all the Havildars of his company were either killed or wounded, and his Lewis gun was seized by the enemy.
Calling up two other men, he got up, charged the enemy, recovered the Lewis gun, and, although bleeding profusely, again got the gun into action.
When his Jemadar arrived he took the gun from Sepoy Ishar Singh and ordered him to go back and have his wound dressed. Instead of doing this the Sepoy went to the medical officer, and was of great assistance in pointing out where the wounded were, and in carrying water to them. He made innumerable journeys to the river and back for this purpose. On one occasion, when the enemy fire was very heavy, he took the rifle of a wounded man and helped to keep down the fire. On another occasion he stood in front of the medical officer who was dressing, a wounded man, thus shielding him with his body. It was over three hours before he finally submitted to be evacuated, being then too weak from loss of blood to object.
His gallantry and devotion to duty were beyond praise. His conduct inspired all who saw him.

He later achieved the rank of Captain.

== Lieutenant William David Kenny ==
William David Kenny.

== Temporary Captain Henry John Andrews ==
Henry John Andrews (1871-22 October 1919).

Andrews served as a T/Captain in the Indian Medical Services. He was awarded his VC posthumously for service on 22 October 1919. He is buried at the Bannu Cemetery, Peshawar, Pakistan.
