= Andrew Skeen =

General Sir Andrew Skeen KCB KCIE CMG
- Born: 20 January 1873
- Died: 18 February 1935 (aged 62)
- Children: Andrew Skeen
- Military career
- Allegiance: British India; United Kingdom
- Branch: British Army; British Indian Army
- Rank: General
- Commands: Southern Command, India; Peshawar District; Kohat District; Tochi and Derajat Columns; Kohat Kurram Force; 3rd (Abbottabad) Indian Infantry Brigade
- Conflicts: North-West Frontier; Siege of Malakand; First World War; Third Anglo-Afghan War; Battle of Bagh; First Waziristan Campaign
- Awards: Knight Commander of the Order of the Bath; Knight Commander of the Order of the Indian Empire; Companion of the Order of St Michael and St George; Mentioned in Despatches; Croix de Guerre (France)

General Sir Andrew Skeen, KCB, KCIE, CMG (20 January 1873 – 18 February 1935) served in the British Indian Army, rising to the position of Chief of the General Staff in India.

== Military career ==
Skeen was commissioned into the King's Own Scottish Borderers as a second lieutenant on 5 December 1891, and promoted to lieutenant on 2 October 1893. He served on the North-West Frontier of India from 1897 to 1898 taking part in operations of the Malakand Field Force. He was deployed to China in 1900, and promoted to captain on 10 July 1901 while serving in the 24th Punjabis. From December 1902 he was in East Africa where he took part in operations in Somaliland until 1904.

He was promoted to brevet lieutenant colonel in January 1914.

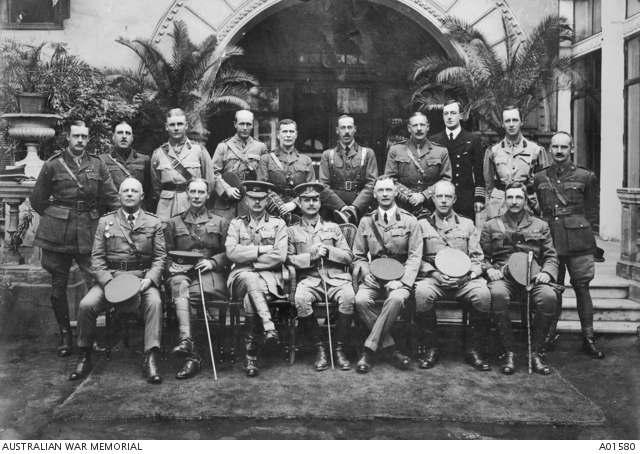
Group portrait of officers of the Australian and New Zealand Army Corps outside Shepheard's Hotel, Cairo, Egypt, March 1915. Stood in the back row, second from the right, is Lieutenant Colonel A. Skeen.

Skeen served in the First World War, receiving promotion in June 1915 to brevet colonel and to the temporary rank of brigadier general and succeeding Brigadier General Harold Walker as brigadier general, general staff to Lieutenant General Sir William Birdwood, general officer commanding (GOC) the Australian and New Zealand Army Corps, taking part in the Gallipoli campaign in 1915. He was mentioned in dispatches with regard to reinforcing Anzac Cove, in full view and reach of the enemy, prior to the Battle of Sari Bair.

The preparation of the ambush was treated as a simple matter by the services therein engaged, and yet I much doubt whether any more pregnant enterprise than this of landing so large a force under the very eyes of the enemy, and of keeping them concealed there three days, is recorded in the annals of war. – General Ian Standish Monteith Hamilton.

For his service at Gallipoli, Skeen was appointed a Companion of the Order of St Michael and St George and awarded the French Croix de Guerre. He went on to be Director of Military Operations at India Army HQ in 1916 and then Deputy Chief of General Staff, Indian Army in 1917. He then became commander of the 3rd (Abbottabad) Indian Infantry Brigade and then commander of the Kohat Kurram Force, in which capacity he took part in the Third Anglo-Afghan War in 1919. He was promoted to substantive major general in June 1918.

Skeen served in Waziristan on the North-West Frontier of India from 1919 to 1920 as Commander, Tochi and Derajat Columns. He was then appointed Commander, Kohat District, India in 1921, Commander, Peshawar District, India in 1922 and, promoted in January 1923 to lieutenant general, General Officer Commanding-in-Chief, Southern Command, India in 1923. Finally he became Chief of the General Staff in India in 1924, and was appointed a Knight Commander of the Order of the Bath in the 1925 New Year Honours, before being promoted to general on 9 June 1929 He retired later that year.

== Publications ==
- Skeen, Gen Sir A., Passing It On: Short Talks on Tribal Fighting on the Northwest Frontier of India, 4th ed (Gale & Polden, 1939). The 4th edition has an additional chapter (by Maj D.B. Mackenzie) on lessons learned from Waziristan 1937.

Military offices
| Preceded by Sir William Marshall | GOC-in-C, Southern Command, India; 1923–1924 | Succeeded by Sir Harold Walker |
| Preceded by Sir Claud Jacob | Chief of the General Staff (India); 1924–1928 | Succeeded by Sir Philip Chetwode |
