= Waziristan campaign (1919–1920) =

Pashtun Anti-British War

Waziristan campaign 1919–1920
- Part of the Anglo-Afghan wars and Interwar period
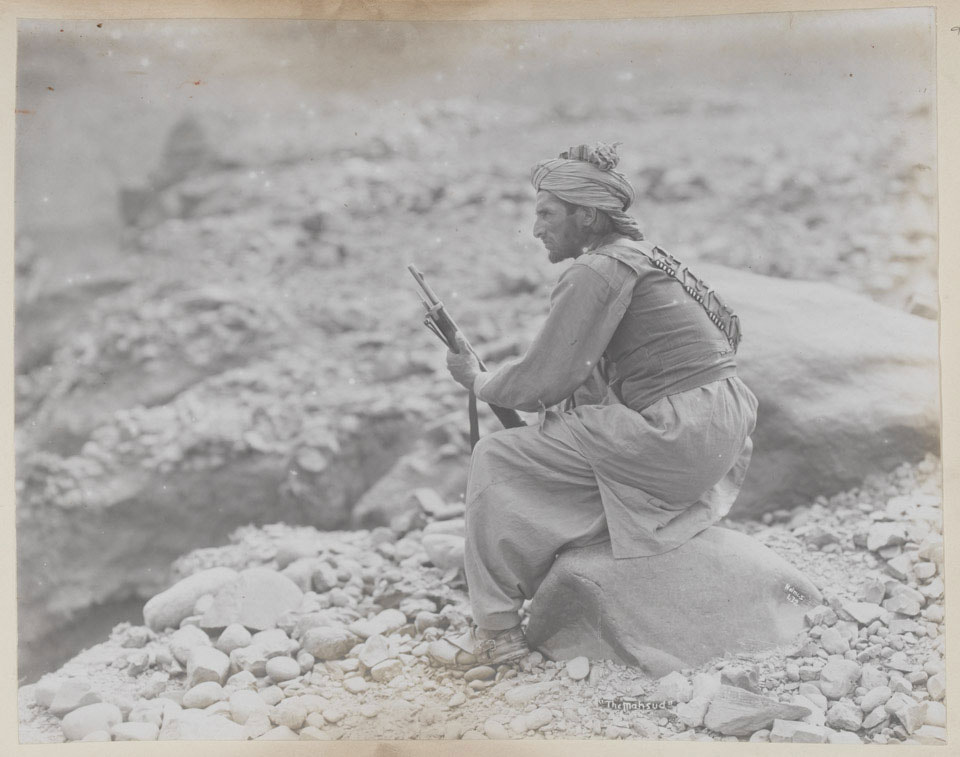
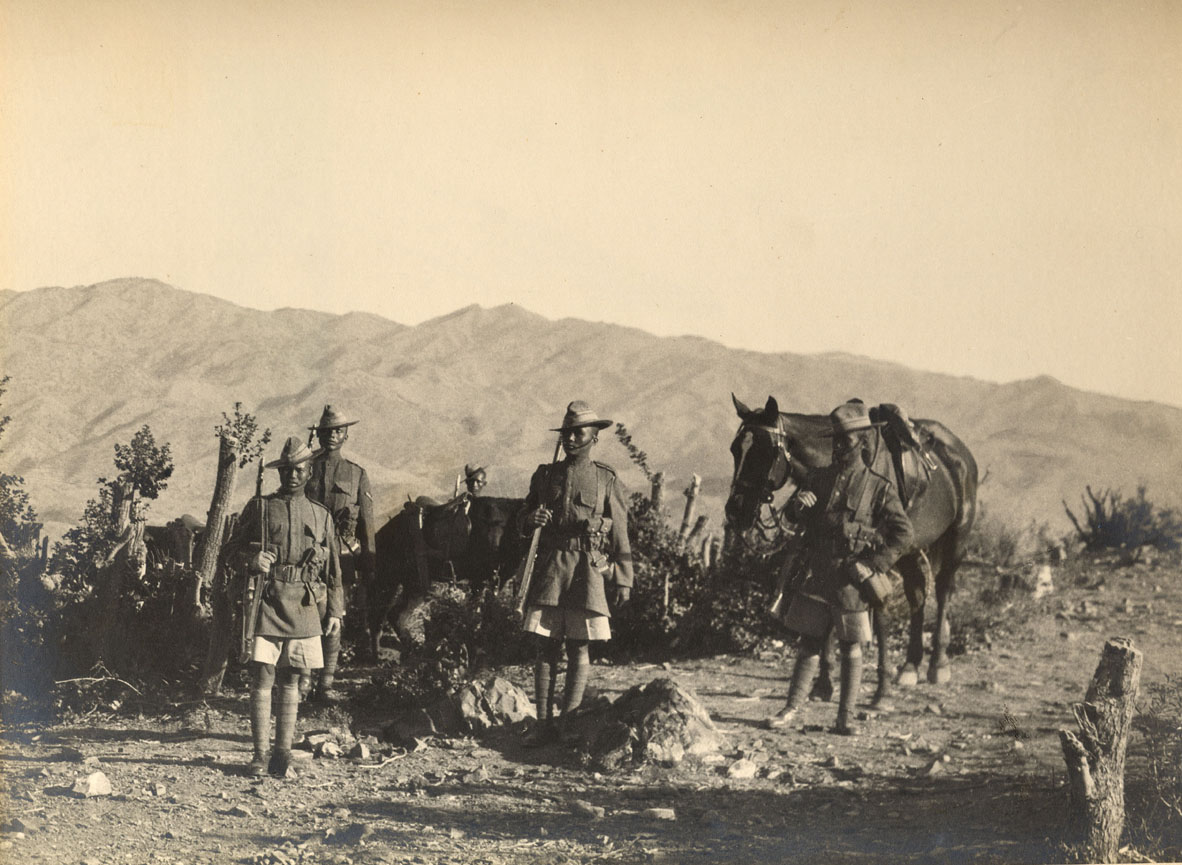
- First Image: A Pashtun Mehsud tribesman in Waziristan, 1919; Second Image: 2nd/5th Royal Gurkha Rifles, who were stationed in the North-West Frontier following the 1919–20 campaign
Date	November 1919 – December 1920
Location	Waziristan and North-West Frontier of India
Result	British–Indian victory

Belligerents
Waziristan	(United Kingdom) British Empire: India

Commanders and leaders
Musa Khan Mahsud; Fazaldin Khan Mahsud	(British Raj) Skipton Climo (British Raj) Andrew Skeen

Strength
Tochi Wazirs: ~13,500; Wana Wazirs: ~11,900; Mahsuds: ~10,900	4 Brigades; 1 Air Force Wing

Casualties and losses
Unknown	~2,286

The Waziristan campaign 1919–1920 was a military campaign conducted in Waziristan by the British Indian Army against the fiercely independent tribesmen that inhabited this region. These operations were conducted in 1919–1920, following the unrest in the aftermath of the Third Anglo-Afghan War.

== Background ==
The prelude to the 1919–1920 campaign was an incursion by the Mahsud Tribe in the summer of 1917 while British forces were otherwise engaged fighting in the First World War. The British Forces eventually restored calm, but in 1919 the Waziris took advantage of unrest in British India following the Third Anglo-Afghan War to launch more raids against British garrisons. It has been asserted that one of the reasons for these raids was that a rumour had been spread amongst the Wazirs and the Mahsuds, that Britain was going to give control of Waziristan to Afghanistan as part of the peace settlement following the Third Anglo-Afghan War. Buoyed by this prospect and sensing British weakness, the tribes were encouraged to launch a series of large scale raids in the administered areas. By November 1919, they had killed over 200 people and wounded a further 200.

== Operations ==
The first attempt to subdue them began in November 1919, when Major-General Sir Andrew Skeen launched a series of operations against the Tochi Wazirs. These operations were largely successful and terms were agreed, and in December Skeen turned his attention to the Mahsuds. As the 43rd and 67th Brigades were grouped together as the Derajet Column and committed to the fighting, they met heavy resistance as the largely inexperienced Indian units came up against determined, well-armed tribesmen. Due to the denuding of the Indian Army caused by commitments overseas during the First World War, many of the battalions employed in this campaign were second-line units with disproportionately large numbers of very young soldiers with inexperienced officers.

The fighting continued for about 12 months in this vein, and the British had to resort to using aircraft on a number of occasions to suppress the tribesmen. There were a number of successes, though, notably the 2nd/5th Gurkhas' stand during the eight-day battle in January 1920 at Ahnai Tangi, and the efforts of the 2nd/76th Punjabis who fought their way through to support them. Equally notable was the counter-attack launched against the Mahsuds by just 10 men of the 4th/39th Garhwal Rifles, led by Lieutenant William David Kenny, who received a posthumous Victoria Cross for his actions.

The Mahsuds took heavy casualties during the fighting at Ahnai Tangi and it was these casualties, as well as the destruction of their villages a month later by bombers of the Royal Air Force, that temporarily subdued the Mahsuds. When the Wana Wazirs rose up in November 1920, they appealed for help from the Mahsuds, but still recovering from their earlier defeat, no support was forthcoming and the Wazir opposition faded away. On 22 December 1920, Wana was re-occupied.

Two other Victoria Crosses were also awarded resulting from this campaign, to Captain Ishar Singh (then a sepoy), and to Captain Henry John Andrews.

== Aftermath ==
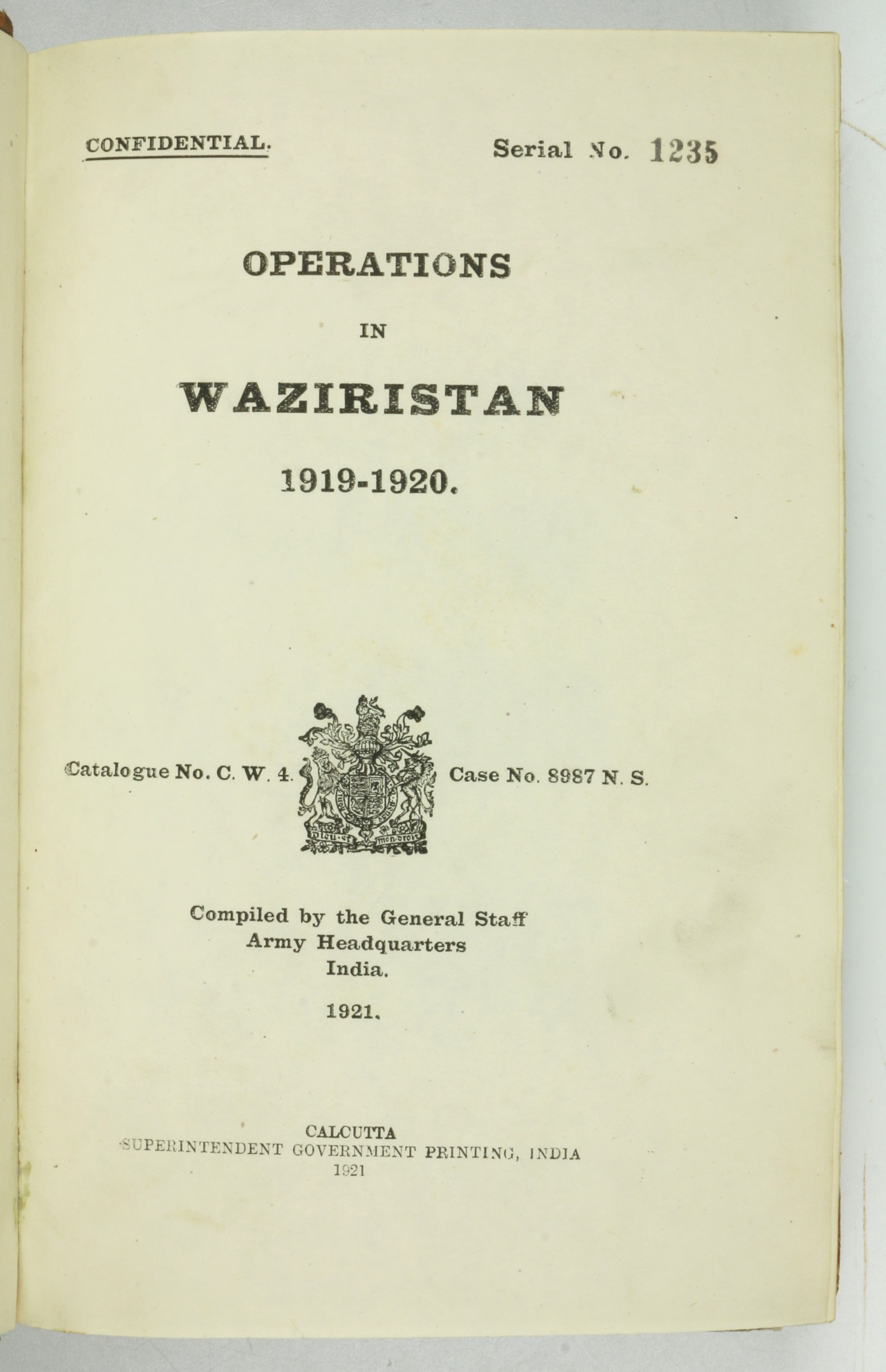
Operations in Waziristan 1919-1920. Compiled by the General Staff, Army Headquarters, India, 1921

Minor raids by the Wazirs and forays by British forces continued into 1921; however, following the 1919–1920 campaign, the British decided upon a change of strategy in Waziristan. It was determined that a permanent garrison of regular troops would be maintained in the region to work much more closely with the militia units that were being reconstituted following the troubles that occurred during the 1919 war with Afghanistan. During this conflict, a large number of men from the irregular militia units from Waziristan deserted and turned against the British. As part of this policy, it was decided that a garrison would be maintained at Razmak. Throughout 1921–1924, the British undertook a road construction effort in the region that led to further conflict during the 1921–1924 campaign. An aerial strafing and bombardment campaign dubbed Pink's War was carried out by the Royal Air Force in 1925. Conflict flared up again in Waziristan in 1936, resulting in another campaign that lasted until 1939.

== See also ==
- First Anglo-Afghan War
- Second Anglo-Afghan War
- Third Anglo-Afghan War
- Waziristan campaign (1921–1924)
- Pink's War
- Waziristan campaign (1936–1939)
- Waziristan rebellion (1948–1954)
- North-West Frontier (military history)
- List of Waziristan Campaign Victoria Cross recipients
