= Battle of Bagh =

Anglo afghan war

Battle of Bagh (1919)
- Part of Third Anglo-Afghan War
| Date | 9–11 May 1919 |
| Location | Bagh, Landi Kotal, North-West Frontier of the British India |
| Result | Afghan victory |
| Territorial changes | Afghanistan captures the town of Bagh |

Belligerents
| Afghanistan | United Kingdom: India |

Commanders and leaders
| Amanullah Khan; Mir Zaman Khan; Nadir Khan | Gen. Andrew Skeen; Gen. George Crocker |

Units involved
| Royal Afghan Army; Afghan infantry battalions; Afghan Tribesmen | (British Raj) British Indian Army; Royal Air Force; 7/11 Gorkha Rifles; 15th Ludhiana Sikhs |

The Battle of Bagh was fought between British and Afghan forces in British India's Northwest Frontier during the Third Anglo-Afghan War. On 3 May 1919, British troops suffered a setback in the northern theatre when Afghan forces captured the town of Bagh in Landi Kotal. Despite efforts to reinforce and launch a counterattack, the British failed to recapture Bagh on 9 May 1919. The attack, led by Brigadier-General George Crocker, involved the 1/15th Sikhs and the 1/11th Gurkha Rifles, but the majority of the brigade was held in covering positions and unable to support the advance effectively. As a result, the attack stalled, and the British forces had to dig in short of their objective.

== Aftermath ==
The British regained the Tangi Springs, restoring water to Landi Kotal. In Peshawar, a planned uprising by Ghulam Haidar was thwarted by British Indian police, leading to Haidar and 22 rebels surrendering.

At Landi Kotal, General Fowler took command on 9 May. With 2 Infantry Brigade arriving on 10 May, Fowler launched an attack on 11 May, driving Afghan forces to retreat towards Loe Dakka. The retreating Afghans were bombed by 31 Squadron aircraft. British casualties were eight killed and 31 wounded, while Afghan losses were about 100 killed and 300 wounded.
