= William David Kenny =

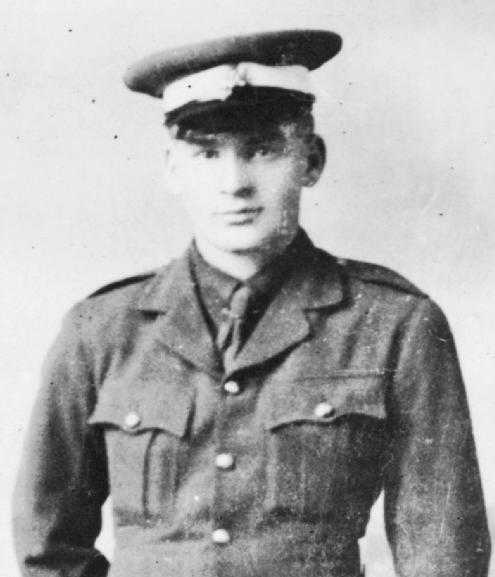
- Lieutenant William Kenny c. 1919
- Born: 1 February 1899; Saintfield, County Down, Ireland
- Died: 2 January 1920 (aged 20) near Kot Kai, Waziristan
- Burial place: Jandola Cemetery in Jandola, Khyber Pakhtunkhwa, Pakistan
- Military career
- Allegiance: United Kingdom
- Branch: British Indian Army
- Service years: 1918–1920
- Rank: Lieutenant
- Units: 4/39th Garhwal Rifles
- Conflicts: North-West Frontier; First Waziristan Campaign †
- Awards: Victoria Cross

William David Kenny VC (1 February 1899 – 2 January 1920) was a British Indian Army officer and an Irish recipient of the Victoria Cross, the highest award for gallantry in the face of the enemy that can be awarded to British and Commonwealth forces.

== Early life ==
Kenny was born in Saintfield, County Down on 1 February 1899.

== Military career ==
Kenny was commissioned in to the Indian Army as a second lieutenant on 31 August 1918. He was promoted to lieutenant a year later.

He was 20 years old, and a lieutenant in the 4/39th Garhwal Rifles during the Waziristan Campaign when the deed took place for which he was awarded the VC. The citation was published in a supplement to The London Gazette of 7 September 1920 (dated 9 September 1920):

War Office, 9th September, 1920.

His Majesty the KING has been graciously pleased to approve of the award of the Victoria Cross to the undermentioned Officers:—

[...]

For most conspicuous bravery and devotion to duty near Kot Kai (Waziristan), on the 2 January 1920, when in command of a company holding an advanced covering position, which was repeatedly attacked by the Mahsuds in greatly superior numbers.

For over four hours this officer maintained his position, repulsing three determined attacks, being foremost in the hand-to-hand fighting which took place, and repeatedly engaging the enemy with bomb and bayonet. His gallant leadership undoubtedly saved the situation and kept intact the right flank, on which depended the success of the operation and the safety of the troops in rear.

In the subsequent withdrawal, recognising that a diversion was necessary to enable the withdrawal of the company, which was impeded by their wounded, with a handful of his men he turned back and counter-attacked the pursuing enemy, and, with the rest of his party, was killed fighting to the last.

This very gallant act of self-sacrifice not only enabled the wounded to be withdrawn, but also averted a situation which must have resulted in considerable loss of life.

== The medal ==
His Victoria Cross is displayed at the National Army Museum in Chelsea.

Memorials: India Gate, Delhi, India, Donaghadee, County Down, Northern Ireland, Dundalk Grammar School, Dundalk, County Louth, Republic of Ireland.
