= Henry John Andrews =

Recipient of the Victoria Cross (1871–1919)

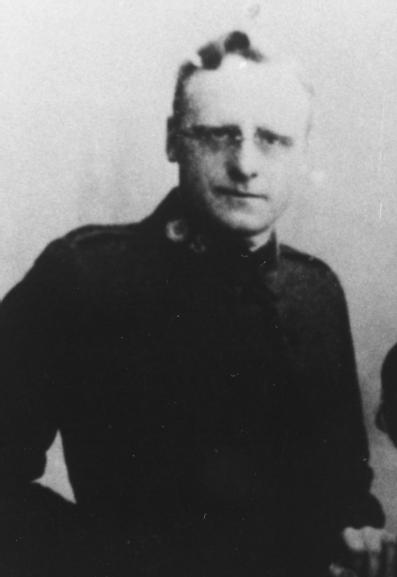
- Born: 23 March 1871; London, England
- Died: 22 October 1919 (aged 48); Waziristan, India
- Burial place: Bannu Cemetery
- Military career
- Allegiance: United Kingdom
- Branch: British Indian Army
- Service years: 1917–1919
- Rank: Captain
- Units: Indian Medical Service
- Conflicts: First Waziristan Campaign
- Awards: Victoria Cross; Member of the Order of the British Empire

Henry John Andrews VC MBE (23 March 1871 – 22 October 1919) was an English recipient of the Victoria Cross, the highest award for gallantry in the face of the enemy that can be awarded to British and Commonwealth forces.

== Details ==
Andrews was commissioned a temporary lieutenant in the Indian Medical Service as of 30 June 1917 and was promoted temporary captain as of 30 June 1918.

He was appointed a Member of the Order of the British Empire as (temporary Lieutenant), Indian Medical Service; Medical Officer in charge of the Thomas Emery Hospital at Moradabad, United Provinces in the London Gazette of 7 June 1918.

He was 48 years old, and a temporary captain in the Indian Medical Service, British Indian Army during the Waziristan Campaign when the following deed took place for which he was awarded the VC. The citation was published in a supplement to the London Gazette of 7 September 1920 (dated 9 September 1920):

His Majesty the KING has been graciously pleased to approve of the award of the Victoria Cross to the undermentioned Officers: —

The late Temporary Captain Henry John Andrews, M.B.E., Indian Medical Service.

For most conspicuous bravery and devotion to duty on, the 22nd October, 1919, when as Senior Medical Officer in charge of Khajuri Post (Waziristan) he heard that a convoy had been attacked in the vicinity of the post, and that men had been wounded. He at once took out an Aid Post to the scene of action and, approaching under heavy fire, established an Aid Post under conditions which afforded some protection to the wounded but not to himself.

Subsequently he was compelled to move his Aid Post to another position, and continued most devotedly to attend to the wounded.

Finally, when a Ford van was available to remove, the wounded, he showed the utmost disregard of danger in collecting the wounded under fire and in placing them in the van, and was eventually killed whilst himself stepping into the van on the completion of his task.

He was buried in Bannu Cemetery, and is commemorated on the Delhi Memorial (India Gate).
