= Third Anglo-Afghan War =

1919 war between the British Empire (India) and the Emirate of Afghanistan

- Part of the interwar period and Anglo-Afghan Wars
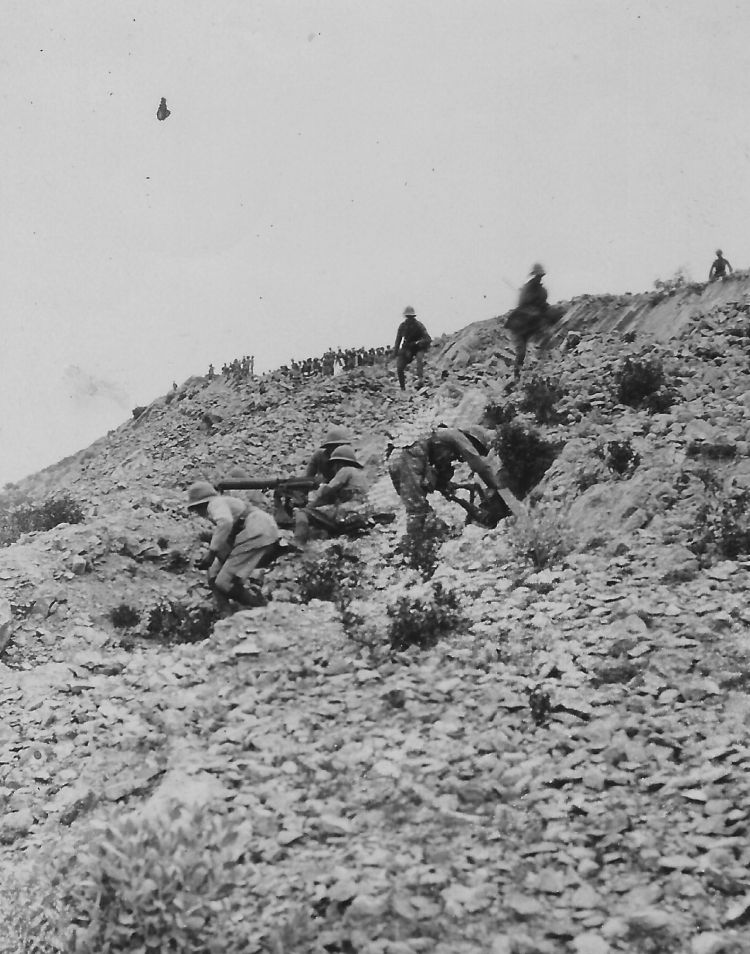
- Soldiers in action at Kohat during the war
Date	3 May – 8 August 1919 (3 months and 5 days)
Location	North-West Frontier of British India and Afghanistan
Result	See § Outcome and negotiation

Belligerents
Afghanistan	United Kingdom: India

Commanders and leaders
(Emirate of Afghanistan) Amanullah Khan; (Emirate of Afghanistan) Nadir Khan; (Emirate of Afghanistan) Saleh Muhammad Khan	(United Kingdom of Great Britain and Ireland) Arthur Barrett; (United Kingdom of Great Britain and Ireland) Reginald Dyer; (United Kingdom of Great Britain and Ireland) Alexander Eustace

Strength
50,000 man standing army supported by up to 80,000 tribesmen	8 divisions 5 independent brigades 3 cavalry brigades, plus a number of modern aircraft, armoured cars and artillery

Casualties and losses
1,000 killed Hundreds more killed from wounds	1,751 killed or wounded 3 planes destroyed

The Third Anglo-Afghan War, (Note: Pashto: د افغان او انگرېز درېيمه جگړه, romanized: Də Afğān au Angrez dreyəma jagṛa [d̪ə ʔaʊ.ɣɑn ʔaʊ ʔaŋg.ɾez d̪ɾe.jə.ma d͡ʒag.ɽa]; Persian: جنگ سوم انگلیس و افغان, romanized: Jang-i siwum-i Afghān u Inglīs [d͡ʒäŋg‿ɪ seː.jʊ́m‿ɪ ʔäv.ɣɑ́ːn ʔʊ ʔɪŋɡ.liːs, d͡ʒäŋg‿ɪ sɪ.wʊ́m‿ɪ ʔäf.ɣɑ́ːn ʔʊ ʔɪŋɡ.liːs]) also known as the Third Afghan War, the British-Afghan War of 1919, and in Afghanistan as the War of Liberation, was a short war which began on 3 May and ended on 8 August 1919. The new Emir of the Emirate of Afghanistan Amanullah Khan declared the holy war of Jihad against the British in the hope to proclaim full independence, as well as to strengthen his own legitimacy. Amanullah's forces invaded British India on three fronts taking advantage of the unrest in India, in an effort to seize the old Afghan provinces west of the Indus River.

Initial victories saw the Afghans invade across the border, defeating the British and occupying Bagh. The British retaliated, leading a counterattack that routed the Afghans. Conflict continued in Kurram, which saw the British overwhelmed. Taking their own initiative, the British seized Spin Boldak in the south, while an Afghan offensive in Thal was contained, with the British occupying Dacca in turn by the end of May. The Royal Air Force were also used in bombing and strafing attacks on the frontier tribes as well as targets within Afghanistan, including Kabul and Jalalabad. Although small in scale, it was a contributing force for Amanullah to call for an armistice in June.

The Anglo-Afghan Treaty of 1919 was signed on 8 August which resulted in the Afghans re-gaining de jure control of foreign affairs from Britain, (Note: The British only controlled Afghanistan's foreign affairs on paper, while in reality, the Emirate of Afghanistan had been interacting with many nations diplomatically on their own, violating the terms of the Treaty of Gandamak.) and the Afghans recognizing the Durand Line as the international border between India and Afghanistan. The conflict however, incited numerous uprisings in Waziristan that lasted until the end of the British Raj.

== Background ==
The root cause of the Third Anglo-Afghan War took hold long before fighting commenced. For the British in India, Afghanistan was seen as a threat. The British worried about Russian intentions, concerned that an invasion of India could be launched by Tsarist forces through Afghanistan. This period became known as the Great Game. In an effort to negate this threat, the British made numerous attempts at imposing their will upon Kabul, and over the course of the 19th century fought two wars: the First Anglo-Afghan War (1839–1842) and the Second Anglo-Afghan War (1878–1880).

The end of the Second Afghan War in 1880, marked the beginning of almost 40 years of good relations between Britain and Afghanistan, under the leadership of Abdur Rahman Khan and Habibullah Khan, during which time the British attempted to manage Afghan foreign policy through the payment of a large subsidy. While the country ostensibly remained independent, under the Treaty of Gandamak (1879) it accepted that in external matters it would "...have no windows looking on the outside world, except towards India". Though in reality, this was not enforced, and Afghanistan continued diplomatic interactions with other nations outside of British approval.

In 1901, the death of Emir Abdur Rahman Khan led indirectly to the war that began 18 years later. His successor, Habibullah, was a pragmatic leader who sided with Britain or Russia depending on Afghan interests. Despite considerable resentment over not being consulted on the Anglo-Russian Convention of 1907 (Convention of St. Petersburg), Afghanistan remained neutral during the First World War (1914–1918), resisting increasing pressure from the Ottoman Empire, which entered the conflict on the side of the Central Powers; the Ottoman sultan (as titular leader of Islam) called for a holy war against the Allies.

Despite remaining neutral in the conflict, Habibullah did in fact accept a Turkish-German mission in Kabul and military assistance from the Central Powers as he attempted to play both sides of the conflict for the best deal. Through continual prevarication, he resisted numerous requests for assistance from the Central Powers, but failed to keep in check troublesome tribal leaders, intent on undermining British rule in India, as Turkish agents attempted to foment trouble along the frontier. The British had long seen Afghanistan as the only capable state of invading India, which remained a serious threat. The departure of a large part of the British Indian Army to fight overseas and news of British defeats at the hands of the Ottomans aided Ottoman agents in their efforts at sedition, and in 1915 there was unrest amongst the Mohmands and then the Mahsuds. Notwithstanding these outbreaks, the frontier generally remained settled at a time when Britain could ill afford trouble.

The Turko-German mission left Kabul in 1916. By that time, however, it had successfully convinced Habibullah that Afghanistan was an independent nation and that it should be beholden to no one. With the end of the First World War, Habibullah sought to obtain rewards from the British government for his assistance during the war. Looking for British recognition of Afghanistan's independence in foreign affairs, he demanded a seat at the Versailles Peace Conference in 1919. This request was denied by the viceroy, Frederic Thesiger, 1st Viscount Chelmsford, on the grounds that attendance at the conference was confined to the belligerents. Further negotiations were scheduled, but before they could begin Habibullah was assassinated on 19 February 1919.

This resulted in a power struggle as Habibullah's brother Nasrullah Khan proclaimed himself as Habibullah's successor, while in Kabul, Amanullah, Habibullah's third son (from his second wife), had also proclaimed himself amir. The Afghan army suspected Amanullah's complicity in the death of his father. Needing a way of cementing his power, upon seizing the throne in April 1919, Amanullah posed as a supporter of democratic ideals, promising governmental reforms. He stated that there should be no forced labour, tyranny, or oppression, and that Afghanistan should be free and independent and no longer bound by the Treaty of Gandamak.

Amanullah had his uncle Nasrullah arrested and sentenced to life imprisonment for Habibullah's murder. Nasrullah had been the leader of a more conservative element in Afghanistan, and his treatment rendered Amanullah's position as Amir somewhat tenuous. By April 1919, Amanullah realised that if he could not find a way to placate the conservatives, he would be unlikely to maintain his hold on power. Looking for a diversion from the internal strife in the Afghan court and sensing advantage in the rising civil unrest in India following the Amritsar massacre, (Note: Following a similar trend to what was happening in Afghanistan, there had been a rising nationalist movement in India at the same time, culminating in riots and disorder in Punjab. On 13 April 1919, Dyer learnt that a large political meeting was taking place at the Jallianwala Bagh, an enclosed area in Amritsar. Fearing that the agitators would incite the crowd to violence and murder and that he had a very small force to protect the European community, Dyer marched 50 men into the Bagh and subsequently opened fire, killing 379 and wounding a further 1,500. Collett 2007) Amanullah decided to invade British India. Lee states that Afghan historians typically represent the Third Anglo-Afghan War as a war of independence, while in reality, it was a Jihad. Upon his accession, Amanullah had already declared Afghanistan independent, and the British were incapable of stopping it. Additionally, Mahmud Tarzi, Amanullah's father-in-law, was appointed foreign minister in provocation to the British prohibition that barred Afghanistan from establishing direct relations with foreign states. Recent research suggests that Amanullah launched the war to safeguard Afghanistan's independence after it was unofficially "secured" following World War I.

=== Afghan forces ===
In 1919, the Afghan regular army was not a very formidable force, and was only able to muster some 50,000 men. These men were organised into 21 cavalry regiments and 75 infantry battalions, with about 280 modern artillery pieces, organised into 70 batteries, in support. In addition to this, however, in a boost to the army's strength, the Afghan command could call upon the loyalty of up to 80,000 frontier tribesmen and an indeterminate number of deserters from local militia units under British command. In reality, the Afghan regular army was not ready for war. As in past years, the upper levels of the officer corps were riddled with political intrigue. In his book on the campaign, Lieutenant-General George Molesworth gave the following evaluation of the Amir's army:

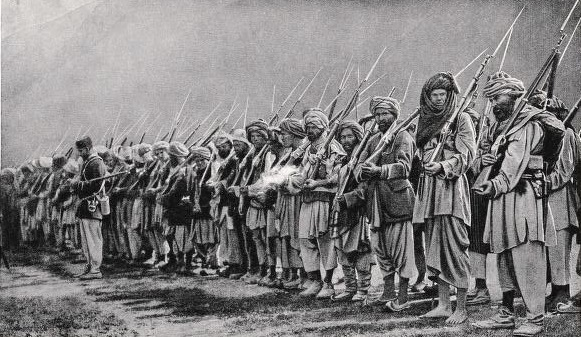
Afghan warriors in 1922

Afghan regular units...were ill-trained, ill-paid, and probably under strength. The cavalry was little better than indifferent infantry mounted on equally indifferent ponies. Rifles varied between modern German, Turkish and British types, to obsolete Martinis and Snyders. Few infantry units had bayonets. Artillery was ponydrawn, or pack, and included modern 10 cm Krupp howitzers, 75 mm Krupp mountain guns and ancient 7 pounder weapons. There were a few, very old, four-barrel Gardiner machine guns. Ammunition was in short supply and distribution must have been very difficult. For the artillery much black powder was used, both as a propellent and bursting charge for shells. The Kabul arsenal workshops were elementary and mainly staffed by Sikh artificers with much ingenuity but little real skill. There was no organised transport and arrangements for supply were rudimentary.

In support of the regulars, the Afghan command expected to call out the tribes, which could gather up to 20,000 or 30,000 Afridi fighters in the Khyber region alone. In stark contrast to the regulars, the tribal lashkars were probably the best troops that the Afghans had, being of excellent fighting quality, well armed, mainly with weapons that they had made themselves or stolen from the garrisons and with plenty of ammunition.

=== British and Indian forces ===
In meeting this threat, the British could call on a much larger force. In May 1919, the British and British Indian Army, not including frontier militia, totalled eight divisions, as well as five independent brigades of infantry and three of cavalry. However, of this force, the entire North-West Frontier Province had three infantry divisions and two cavalry brigades, although there was also GHQ India's central reserve of one infantry division and one cavalry brigade. From this, they formed a striking force of two infantry divisions and two cavalry brigades for offensive operations on the Kyber front with the possibility of using it also in the Tochi and Kurram areas. One infantry division and a so-called "mounted" brigade were also detailed for operations on the Baluchistan–Zhob front. There were also three frontier brigades as well as a number of frontier militia and irregular corps.

Artillery was also in short supply, and the three frontier divisions each had a British field artillery brigade of the Royal Field Artillery with two batteries of 18-pounders and one battery of 4.5-inch howitzers, and an Indian mountain brigade with two batteries of 2.75-inch mountain guns. There were also two batteries of tractor-drawn 6-inch howitzers and two British mountain batteries of the Royal Garrison Artillery, which were reinforced with 3.7-inch mountain howitzers. However, most batteries had only four guns. Finally, there were also 15-pounder guns of the Frontier Garrison Artillery.

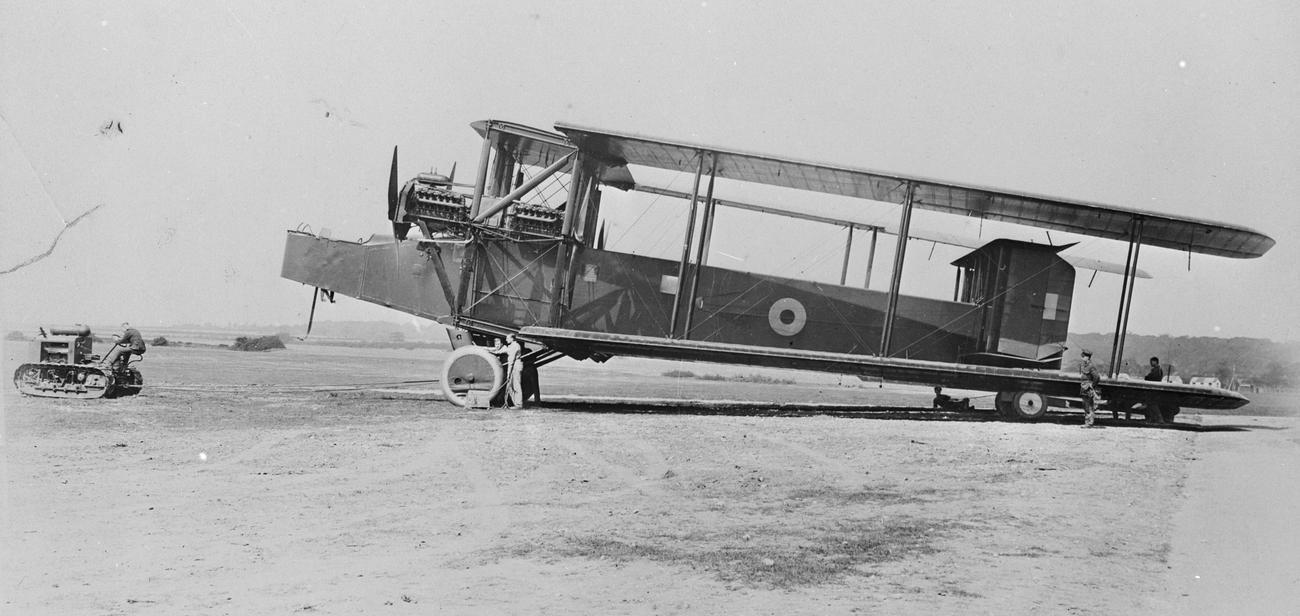
A Royal Air Force Handley Page Type O bomber, with its wings folded back

Machine guns, at least on the Khyber front, were old .303 Maxims. The British gained a command and control advantage with their use of motor transport and wireless communications, while armoured cars and RAF detachments increased their firepower and reach, the latter being demonstrated to the Afghans by a bombing raid on Kabul itself. They could also direct the fire of the 60-pounders. The RAF squadrons involved were No. 31 Squadron and No. 114 Squadron.

The main problem for the British was discontent among their soldiers. The troops in India were no longer as uncritical as they had been when considering what they were being asked to do. Like other units of the British Army, many of the troops considered the war over and looked forward to being demobilised. The Indian Army had been heavily committed to the First World War and had suffered a large number of casualties. (Note: The Indian Army sent over a million men overseas, and suffered approximately 115,000 casualties, see First World War casualties.) Many of its units still had not returned from overseas, and those that had had begun the process of demobilisation. As such, many regiments had lost almost all of their most experienced men. Likewise, the British Army in India had been gutted. Prior to 1914 there had been 61 British regiments (Note: The term regiments in this case is used to describe infantry battalions, or cavalry regiments.) serving in India. However, of these, all but ten (two cavalry and eight infantry) had been withdrawn in order to fight in Europe or the Middle East. In their place, units of the Territorial Force (TF), part-time soldiers usually only intended for home defence but who had volunteered for overseas service, had been sent in order to release regular units for the fighting in France. (Note: The order of battle shows, however, that of the 13 British infantry battalions nine were regular, although they had many men who had only volunteered for the First World War. One of the TF battalions had previously been engaged in operations in Waziristan in 1917.) After four years of mundane garrison duty, away from their families and disaffected, most of these men were really only interested in demobilisation and returning to Britain to get on with their lives. They were in no way prepared for a hard-fought campaign on the Indian frontier.

=== Preparations ===
Amanullah Khan raised three armies planned for his invasion of British India through a three-pronged attack. The raised force in Nangarhar led by Saleh Muhammad Khan commanded mostly Mohmand and Afridi tribesmen. His intention was to attack through the Khyber Pass and seize Peshawar. This would also coincide with a planned uprising in Peshawar sponsored by Mahmud Tarzi and other Indian revolutionaries.

The second army was led by Nadir Khan, who began raising an army in Khost. His objective was to invade Waziristan and advance as far as Kurram, which were former territories of Afghanistan that were ceded during the creation of the Durand Line. Nadir Khan faced initial difficulties toward raising an army due to an uprising in Gardez, and lack of support toward the war across the border. Nadir Khan's suppression of a tribal uprising a decade before had left many in doubt of joining the war directly, holding sentiments to refuse both an Afghan, or British army to cross through the territory of the frontier tribes.

The third army was led by 'Abd al-Quddus Khan, who was beginning to raise an army in Kandahar. His objective was to advance into Balochistan and seize control of Chaman, Gulistan, Pishin, and establish complete control over the Khojak Pass. However, 'Abd al-Quddus's late arrival saw a revolt by religious leaders which he had to suppress with the aid of Ali Ahmad Khan. This was followed by a complete massacre of the Afghan Qizilbash in Kandahar. When 'Abd al-Quddus was finally capable of marching into Balochistan, the armistice was already signed and the war had come to an end.

=== Intelligence Failure ===
Despite British Indian intelligence collection indicating an imminent attack from the Afghan army, British Indian leadership was caught by complete surprise by the Afghan attack, the so-called "bolt from the blue." After two decades of relative peace in Afghanistan, British Indian leadership came to expect that the Afghans would never attack the British, and so the British left intelligence collection in the region to be run in an unorganized, ad hoc manner. Nevertheless, British intelligence collected information that indicated imminent conflict. British Indian leadership played down the intelligence and lacked a competent and dedicated intelligence apparatus to challenge their assumptions. This intelligence failure proved significant in motivating the British Indian government to create the Peshawar Intelligence Bureau to overhaul its intelligence collection in Afghanistan.

== War ==
=== Afghan invasion – 1st Bagh ===
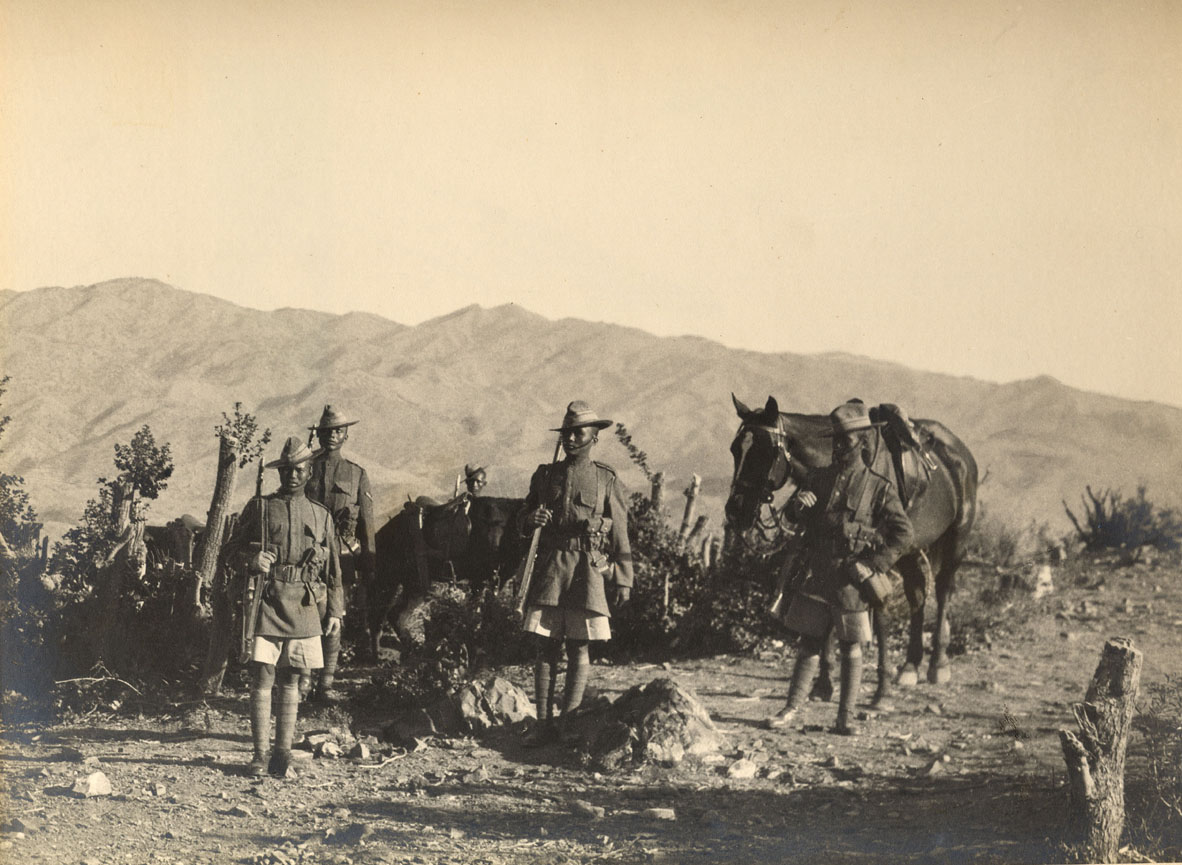
2nd/5th Royal Gurkha Rifles, North-West Frontier 1923

The conflict began on 3 May 1919 when Afghan troops crossed the frontier at the western end of the Khyber Pass and captured the town of Bagh. Bagh was strategically important to the British and Indians as it provided water to Landi Kotal, which was at the time garrisoned by just two companies of troops from the British Indian Army. Although initially considered a minor border infraction, this attack was actually part of the wider invasion plan. For whatever reason the attack had been launched ahead of schedule, however, for Amanullah had intended initially for it to coincide with an uprising that was being planned in Peshawar for 8 May. This served to alert the British Chief Commissioner of the North West Frontier, Sir George Roos-Keppel, who had become aware of the plan and as a result he was able to successfully convince the Viceroy, Lord Chelmsford, of the need to respond to the occupation of Bagh before it led to further unrest in Peshawar.

In response to this the British Indian government declared war upon Afghanistan on 6 May and ordered a general mobilisation of the British and Indian forces. It was decided next that the two companies of Sikhs and Gurkhas that had been sent to Landi Kotal needed to be reinforced, however, the mobilisation process had only just begun and at that stage there was only one battalion available for this, so on 7 May the 2nd Battalion, Somerset Light Infantry were brought up clandestinely through the Khyber Pass aboard a convoy of 37 lorries.

Meanwhile, a cordon was thrown around Peshawar and demands were made for the population to hand over the uprising's ringleaders. Amid threats that the city's water supply would be cut, the inhabitants complied and by dawn on 8 May the situation in the city was under control and the threat of an uprising abated.

=== 2nd Bagh and British counterattack ===
By this stage more reinforcements were available and the garrison at Landi Kotal grew to brigade-size, with the arrival of the rest of the 1st Infantry Brigade under Brigadier G.D. Crocker. On 9 May the British and Indian troops launched an attack on the Afghans that had seized Bagh the previous week. The attack, however, failed when the brigade commander decided to split his forces and detach almost half his force to protect his flank and as a result was unable to achieve the necessary concentration of force to capture all of his objectives. Coinciding with this, three BE2c aircraft from the Royal Air Force carried out a bombing raid on Dacca in Afghanistan, attacking a group of hostile tribesmen. (Note: Loyn 2009, p. 169 identifies these aircraft as two Sopwith Camels.)

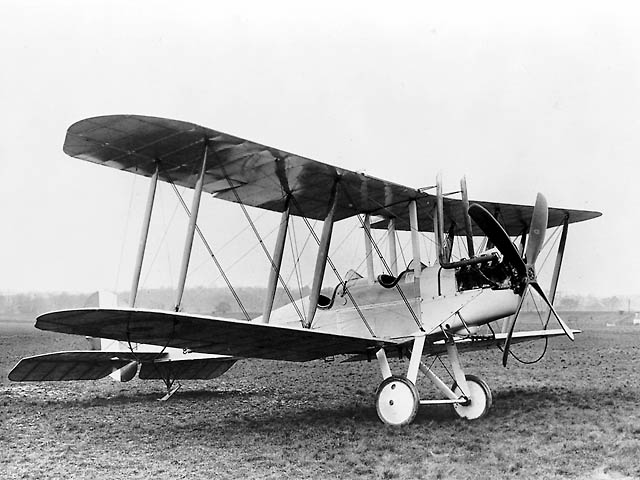
A Royal Air Force BE2C

Following this the 2nd and 3rd Infantry Brigades of the 1st Infantry Division were dispatched from Nowshera and Abbottabad, concentrating at Jamrud and Kacha Garhi. At the same time, the 6th Brigade from the 2nd Infantry Division moved up to Peshawar from Rawalpindi to help quell the unrest there. Two days later, on 11 May, a second attack was made on Bagh by the 1st and 2nd Infantry Brigades, under Major General Fowler, and this time it proved successful. Supported with 22 machine guns and 18 artillery pieces, the attack was preceded by a thirty-minute preparation bombardment before being carried by the 2nd Battalion, North Staffordshire Regiment and two battalions from the 11th Gurkhas, who charged into the Afghan positions with bayonets fixed and drove them into the Lower Khyber, where they were subjected to further indirect fire from mountain guns that had been set up in ambush.

As the Afghans were forced back over the border, the RAF followed them across and carried out a number of bombing runs. The rout was total and tribesman that might have otherwise have been expected to counterattack in support of the Afghans decided against doing so, instead turning their efforts to looting the battlefield and gathering the arms and ammunition that the retreating Afghans had left behind. Casualties during the battle, later known as the Second Battle of Bagh, amounted to 100 Afghans killed and 300 wounded, while the British and Indian forces lost eight killed and 31 wounded.

Although Amanullah continued to profess that he had no untoward intentions, Roos-Keppel decided that it was prudent to continue the advance and ordered the army to pursue the Afghans across the border. On 13 May British and Indian troops seized control of the western Khyber without opposition and occupied Dacca, however, the British camp was poorly sited for defence and as a consequence they came under an intense long-range artillery barrage from Afghan artillery before Amanullah launched an infantry assault on them. This assault was defeated and the British launched a counter-attack the following day, however, they were unable to consolidate their position, and as a result it was not until 17 May that the area was secured and the Afghans withdrew.

=== 'Stonehenge Ridge' ===
Meanwhile, the previous day, British and Indian forces had launched an attack on 'Stonehenge Ridge', where an Afghan force of about 3,000 men had established themselves with a number of artillery pieces and machine guns. Under cover of a preliminary bombardment to soften up the Afghan defences, men from the 11th Sikh Regiment had launched the initial assault, however, they were forced to stop their attack when they ran out of ammunition at 08.00 hours, and although a resupply was effected at 10.30 hours, it was not until 14.00 hours that the attack was resumed. By this time the troops were exposed to the heat of the day; nevertheless, after another barrage was called down, the Sikhs assaulted the Afghan line despite the heat and the attack was carried to the top of the ridge. Upon reaching the escarpment they found that the Afghans had fled the battlefield, leaving most of their equipment, artillery and a number of standards. During the assault the British and Indian forces lost 22 killed and 157 wounded, while Afghan losses were estimated at 200 killed and 400 wounded.

At this time, however, trouble struck in the British rear along their line of communications through the Khyber where the Khyber Rifles began to become disaffected by the situation and began to desert en masse. As a result, it was decided to disarm and disband the regiment in an effort to stop the spread of similar sentiment to other regiments. Following this Lord Chelmsford decided that the situation could be resolved by continuing the advance further into Afghanistan and gave the order for the brigade in Dacca to march towards Jalalabad, but this order could not be carried out as fighting broke out further to the south and in the eastern Khyber.

=== Kurram and Spin Baldek ===
As part of the attack on the Khyber, secondary attacks had been planned on Quetta and Kurram, in the north in Chitral state and in the south in Baluchistan and the Zhob Valley. On 23 May the British posts around the Kurram Valley had to be abandoned. The following day Handley Page bombers attacked Kabul; (Note: Loyn 2009, p. 169 states that there was only one aircraft involved in this attack, although Wilkinson-Latham 1998, p. 24 describes multiple aircraft.) however, it did little to stem the tide, and the supply situation in Landi Kotal grew worse.

On 27 May the British commander in Quetta decided to attack the Afghan fortress at Spin Baldak, capturing it (the last time the British Army used an escalade) and, in the process, seized the initiative in the south; however, the situation in the centre of the war zone, around Kurram, remained desperate for the British. The Afghan forces in this area were under the command of General Nadir Khan (Note: Loyn 2009, p. 169 uses the name "Nadir Shah".) and he possessed a force of some 14 battalions. Against this, the British at Thal, under Brigadier General Alexander Eustace, possessed only four battalions. To make matters worse, the only troops protecting the upper Tochi Valley were the disaffected North Waziristan Militia. Concerned that they would rise up against him if left to their own devices, Eustace gave the order to abandon the militia outposts, but in doing so, precipitated the desertion of many of the militiamen. This disaffection spread and the South Waziristan Militia in Wana turned on their officers and any men who had remained loyal and attacked them. The survivors, under Major Russell, the commandant, were forced to fight their way out to a column of the North Zhob Militia which had been sent out to relieve them.

=== Thal ===
Seeing that the situation was deteriorating for the British and seeing an opportunity, Nadir Khan decided to attack Thal. As the Frontier Constabulary had abandoned their posts, on the night of 28/29 May the Afghans were able to occupy a tower 500 yards (460 m) from the fort and from there they were able to set fire to a number of food stores. This made the situation in the fort dire, as the supply situation had already been low. Other factors also stacked up against the British. Eustace's force was outnumbered and outgunned. He possessed no regular British infantry and his four battalions were inexperienced Indian units, consisting mainly of young recruits. After repelling an infantry assault on 29 May, the following day the garrison was subjected to a heavy bombardment from Afghan guns. As a result of this, the British decided to bring the 16th Infantry Division, consisting of the 45th and 46th Infantry Brigades, up to Peshawar from Lahore, for the purpose of advancing on Jalalabad and have it move up to Kurram. While part of the division was detached to defend Kohat, the 45th Infantry Brigade under Brigadier General Reginald Dyer—who had been at the centre of the Amritsar massacre—set out to relieve Eustace's force at Thal. Dyer's force consisted of only one British battalion, the 1st/25th London Regiment, as well as Dogras, Punjabis and Gurkhas. Short of rations and possessing no transport, they were forced to march through intense heat to relieve Thal.

Despite the conditions, however, the British and Indian troops under Dyer's command rose to the occasion and covered the last 18 miles (29 km) in under 12 hours and on 1 June they ran into a blocking force of tribesman that barred both the northern and southern approaches to Thal. Dyer attacked both ends with his artillery, while sending his infantry against the southern approach. Unable to withstand the attack, the tribesmen retreated and as a result the way through to Eustace's garrison was cleared. During the siege, the British suffered 94 casualties, of which eight were killed, four died of wounds and 82 were wounded.

=== Importance of British airpower ===
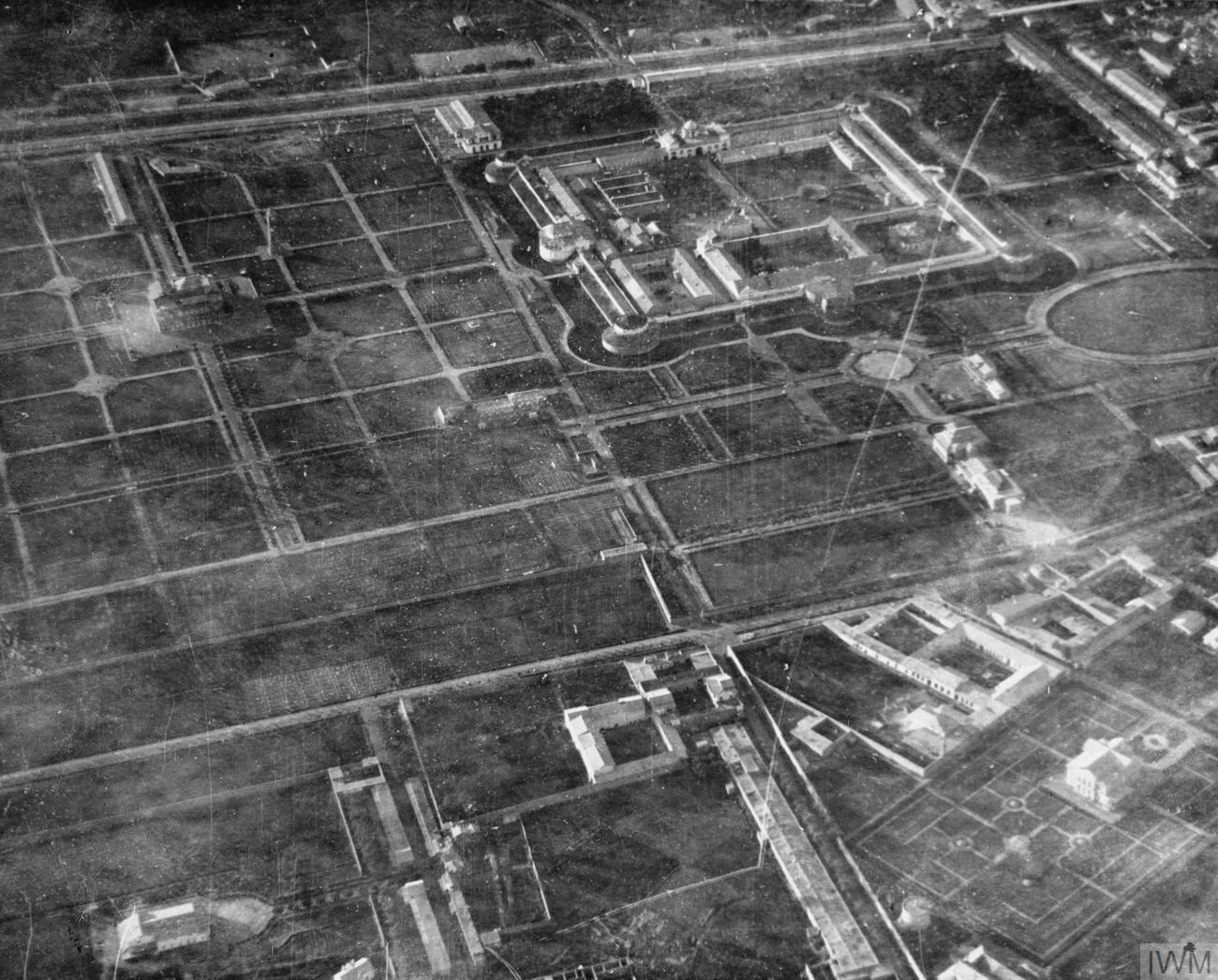
Aerial photograph of the Amir's palace during the bombing raid on Kabul, Afghanistan, on 24 May 1919

Although limited in numbers and quality, (Note: Loyn 2009, pp. 169–170 describes British air assets as being "war torn" and lacking power to fly over the mountains, instead having to fly through the Khyber Pass or using gusts of wind to clear obstacles.) airpower proved to be one of the greatest assets that the British possessed during this conflict. Not only did it allow them to extend their reach beyond the border and bomb Kabul, but it also enabled them to harass the retreating enemy and to break up tribesmen as they attempted to form larger groups prior to launching an attack. The ability of the British to project airpower, even small scale raids, had considerable psychological effects. For example, the single-plane raid on the palace which took place on 24 May 1919, although producing little actual damage, nevertheless greatly affected the morale of Afghan citizens and contributed to bringing Amanullah to request an armistice.

Indeed, as a result of the war and the lessons that were learned about the potential of airpower in the region, following the war, the Chief of the Air Staff, Sir Hugh Trenchard, proposed controlling the frontier by air power alone. This plan had proven highly successful in Mesopotamia, Aden and the Transjordan, however, due to the uniqueness of the North-West Frontier and also due to inter-service politics the plan was not accepted until later. In 1937, it was eventually decided that should another war break out with Afghanistan, or in the event of a major tribal uprising, the RAF would take the offensive, while the ground forces would act defensively. During the course of the conflict, British aircraft losses included at least one plane crashed and two shot down.

King Amanullah objected to the British about the air raids on Kabul, citing British condemnation of the German Zeppelin attacks on London. In his letter to the British government he said, "It is a matter of great regret that the throwing of bombs by Zeppelins on London was denounced as a most savage act and the bombardment of places of worship and sacred spots was considered a most abominable operation, while now we see with our own eyes that such operations were a habit which is prevalent amongst all civilized people of the West."

=== Ceasefire ===
On 29 May Amanullah requested for an armistice which, despite some protests, his Afghan commanders reluctantly agreed to. This was sent to the British Indian government on 31 May.

On 2 June, at dawn Dyer's brigade launched an attack on the Afghan regulars that were positioned away to the west of Thal. As this attack went in Nadir Khan sent out an envoy to deliver a message to the brigade commander. The message told Dyer that Amir Amanullah had ordered Nadir Khan to cease hostilities and Nadir Khan asked Dyer to acknowledge that he would honour the armistice. Unaware that this request had been made, and uncertain as to whether the message and request for a cease fire was a ruse on Nadir Khan's part, Dyer decided that he would not take any chances and sent the reply: "My guns will give an immediate reply, but your letter will be forwarded to the Divisional Commander".

After this Dyer continued his attack and as Nadir Khan's force withdrew from the area, Dyer followed them up with cavalry and armoured cars from the 37th Lancers, while the RAF, using machine guns and iron bombs, attacked and dispersed about 400 tribesmen that were in the area and which posed a threat of counterattack.

On 3 June, the Afghan camp at Yusef Khel was seized by two platoons from the 1st/25th London and two troops from the 37th Lancers supported by a section of guns from the 89th Battery. Following this Dyer received a telegram ordering to break off his pursuit as an armistice came into effect that day.

== Outcome and negotiation ==
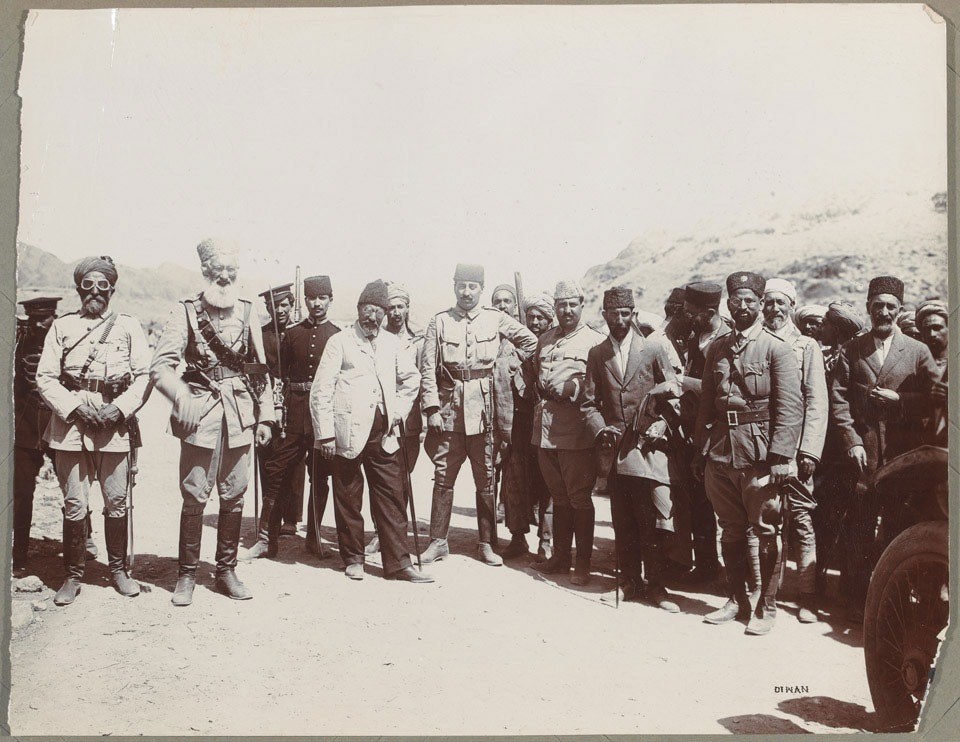
Afghan peace delegates in 1919

Although the war did not proceed as the Afghans had wished, by the end of the war the Afghans had diplomatically secured their independence. Ludwig states that the British did not win the war as both sides had controlled enemy territory, and no decisive battles had occurred to establish that anybody was decisively defeated. In repulsing the invasion, the British were either considered tactically victorious, with the Afghans suffering a military defeat, or having ended the war in a military stalemate. However, other sources state the Afghans won a political and diplomatic victory by asserting their main goal, independence, and the right to conduct their own foreign affairs.

After the aerial bombings of Kabul and the prospect of Jalalabad and Kandahar being occupied by the British, the Afghans requested an armistice in May 1919. The war had lasted exactly one month, though sporadic conflict continued until the Armistice was signed in June after Afghans were pushed back from the Indian territory. The Afghan government's propaganda also attempted to portray it as having brought Britain to the negotiating table through their victories in order to justify the decision to cease fire. Jonathan L. Lee notes that the Afghan army "had been soundly defeated on two fronts" despite the propaganda from the Afghan government to portray the war as a larger success, with Spin Boldak having occupied by the British. Nonetheless, Nadir Khan's campaign had instilled a significant uprising across the Baluchistan, which lingered until the summer of 1919. Lee characterizes the Afghan army as "barely fit for purpose" as it was defeated " not just by the superior technology and discipline of the British army, but by lightly armed and untrained tribal levies."

Although an armistice had been agreed upon, British forces were regularly harassed by raiding tribes, and the British hoped that the beginning of peace negotiations would see the resistance dissipate. 'Abd al-Quddus had further instigated tribal raids unto the British supply lines. The British were intent on a quick peace deal due to fears of unrest and the rise of Communism. Even then there were disagreements between officials on what approach to consider, the British officials who wanted to restore the closed frontier policy and enforce strict control over Afghanistan's foreign affairs included Curzon and Denys Bray, while the belief that the Amir would adopt a more conciliatory tone after his defeat was held by officials such as Viceroy Chelmsford and Henry Dobbs. The Afghan delegation first met with the British on 26 July, headed by Ali Ahmad Khan. Grant emphasized the needless war, and relayed that the tribes harassing British forces during the armistice made negotiations impossible to continue. Ali Ahmad responded, believing the British responsible for the war, and attempting to portray the British as the ones who wished for peace, while relating the threat of the Soviet Union. In further meetings, Grant wished for Afghanistan to remain in the British fold, which Ali Ahmad adamantly rejected and held on independence as a core demand. This was likely supported by the fact that the Afghans wished to transfer the caliphate to Afghanistan. Grant was given permission to give an ultimatum to the Afghans to accept British demands, although not to breach the armistice.

The Afghans initially declined the ultimatum on 31 July, before agreeing to them on 4 August with modifications to the treaty. The Afghans wished to eliminate any wording that blamed them for the start of the conflict, which Grant accepted. Grant was ready to make important concessions, and believed it was time to do so to the Afghans had it been demanded, but was worried about risking his own authority. On 5 August, the British government affirmed that if the British did not retain control of Afghanistan's foreign affairs, the subsidy given to them would be ended. On 6 August, the final rendition of the treaty was given to the Afghans, which dictated that peace would be established, guns could not be imported through British India, the ending of subsidy payments by the British to the Afghans, the acceptance of the British of an Afghan mission to restore relations, and the affirmation of the Durand line. Although, the cabinet had indirectly recognised Afghanistan's independence with the phrase 'Independent Afghan Government' as the title in the agreement. The mentions of Afghanistan as an 'independent' or 'free' nation were omitted in the actual clauses. A personal letter by Grant to Amir assured that the contents of the agreement did not interfere in Afghanistan's internal or foreign affairs.

Thus, the treaty of Rawalpindi was concluded on 8 August 1919. As a result of the peace treaty that was negotiated, the British ceased payment of the Afghan subsidy, and thus ended their claim to direct Afghan foreign policy, which had been the quid pro quo of the Emir accepting the subsidy. While the Afghan government had "effectively capitulated", Amanullah received little but a letter personally addressed to him that indirectly recognised Afghanistan's independence, with Afghan government propaganda trying to conceal it by claiming the war was a complete victory. The government propaganda maintained that it had won the war because "Britain had tacitly recognized Afghanistan's independence," although the treaty did not "explicitly recognise Afghan independence" and it took until 1922 for independence by treaty to be formally recognized. The British also made some political gains, most notably the reaffirmation of the Durand Line – which had long been a contentious issue between the two nations – as a border separating Afghanistan from the North-West Frontier, and the undertaking that the Afghans made to stop interference on the British side of the line. Grant also attempted to justify the concessions to the Afghans, believing it was impossible to control Afghanistan's foreign affairs unless by having to fully subjugate the country. Lee states that the treaty blamed "Afghan aggression" for the war, mooting all previous treaties. The treaty was defined more as a personal arrangement with the Amir than with the Afghan state.

The British believed in the negotiations that by letting Afghanistan become independent, it would still be reliant on British military and economic aid, and thus accepted the treaty and the recognition of Afghanistan as an independent state. Despite this, British and Afghan diplomats often snubbed each other as a result of the war, which the British did not forget. In one occasion, as the Afghans attempted to open diplomatic ties to Italy, the British informed the Italians that they had to recognize the British influence in the country. Afghan diplomats in Kabul in retaliation attempted to humiliate British diplomats there who were negotiating a treaty, which resulted in Afghan delegations to London being refused. British diplomatic mail and letters were rejected, and the British government refused to refer to Amanullah Khan as "Your Majesty" demanding that they wanted to see "some evidence of goodwill" on his part before granting such recognition and letters to George V were intentionally left unanswered.

The British had traditionally wanted Afghanistan as a buffer state between India and the Russian Empire. In 1919, the Russian Civil War was raging and any threat from Russia to India at the time was potential rather than real. Moreover, the British were by far the largest supporters of the White movement in the Russian Civil War with the British contributing more arms to the Whites than all other nations combined. It was assumed in London that if the Whites won the Civil War, a new era in Anglo-Russian relations might possibly open as the victorious Whites might be grateful for British support, rendering the need for a buffer state in Central Asia irrelevant. The British also stopped arms sales from India to Afghanistan. But, as British influence declined, the Afghans were able to gain control of their own foreign affairs and in the aftermath emerged as a fully independent state.

The circumstances behind the war were complicated as was the final settlement. In going to war in 1919 against British India, Amir Amanullah's war aims were complicated. Even up against a depleted British Indian Army, a tactical victory was unlikely; however, the war served the dual purpose of deflecting domestic criticism and also offering the opportunity for strategic political gains. Lee observes that government was "so successful" in hiding the true terms of the treaty that, Amanullah Khan was hailed as a hero across Muslim world, with some even calling for him to become the new Caliph. Amanullah Khan's intentions for Jihad however, failed. Lee elaborates that Amanullah Khan was "no general" and had no active role in the war.

Casualties during the conflict amounted to approximately 1,000 Afghans killed in action, with hundreds more dying from wounds. The British and Indian forces on the other hand suffered 236 killed in action and 615 wounded. Additionally there were 566 deaths from cholera and 344 deaths from other causes; for a total of 1,751 dead or wounded.

Lee states that through unprovoked aggression towards the British, Amanullah antagonized Afghanistan's key ally in the region, prompting British officials to consider Afghanistan a hostile neighbour and his rule something to subvert. Lee argues that if he had negotiated with them following his declaration of independence, rather than waging war, they would likely have conceded some form of conditional independence, as they had previously conveyed the same to his father. Although the fighting concluded in August 1919, its effects continued to be felt in the region for some time afterwards. The nationalism and disruption that it had sparked stirred up more unrest in the years to come, particularly in Waziristan, which saw an uprising that was long encouraged by Nadir Khan. The tribesmen, always ready to exploit governmental weakness, whether real or perceived, banded together in the common cause of disorder and unrest. They had become well-armed as a result of the conflict, from which they benefitted greatly from the weapons and ammunition that the Afghans had left behind and from an influx of manpower in large numbers of deserters from the militia that had joined their ranks. With these additions they launched a campaign of resistance against British authority on the North-West Frontier that was to last until the end of the Raj.

=== Decorated Afghan soldiers ===
Soldiers decorated by the authority of Ghazi Amanullah Khan:

- Ghazi Mir Zaman Khan, a National Hero of Afghanistan who was decorated with 4 medals, being the Lōy Khan (Grand Khan), Wafa, (Loyalty), Sedāqat (Honesty), and Khedmat (Service)
- Nisar Muhammad Yousafzai, a War Hero decorated with the Order of Gallantry of the Emirate of Afghanistan for wartime bravery

=== Battle honours, British Indian army ===
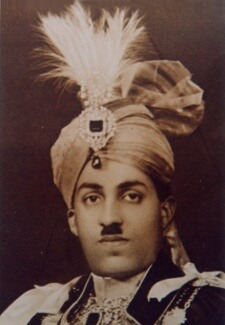
The Nawab of Bahawalpur, Sadeq Mohammad Khan V, fought for the British during the Third Anglo-Afghan War

British and Indian infantry units that participated in the conflict received the battle honour "Afghanistan 1919". No other battle honours for individual engagements were issued. Additionally, unlike the first two Anglo-Afghan wars where individual campaign ribbons were issued for separate engagements, no campaign medal was struck for this conflict. Instead, participation in this conflict was recognised by a clasp to the India General Service Medal (1908–1935).

The award of the battle honour was made in four separate Army and Governor General's orders. The earliest, Army Order 97/24, granted the honour to 14 British units. Governor General's Order 193/26 made awards to Indian Army Corps. Governor General's Order 1409/26 made awards to Indian States Forces and finally a further Governor General's Order in 1927 made awards to a further three Gurkha regiments.

The Army Order was unusual in that a mistake was made in awarding the Afghanistan 1919 battle honour to The Hampshire Regiment and the 21st Lancers. This was subsequently rectified and the award to these two units was withdrawn.

Pursuant to Army Order 97/24:

- 1st King's Dragoon Guards
- 1/4th Battalion, Queen's (Royal West Surrey Regiment)
- 2nd Battalion, King's (Liverpool Regiment)
- 2nd Battalion, Prince Albert's (Somerset Light Infantry)
- 1st Battalion, Alexandra, Princess of Wales's Own (Yorkshire Regiment)
- 1st Battalion, Duke of Wellington's (West Riding Regiment)
- 2/4th Battalion, Border Regiment
- 1st Battalion and 2/6th (Cyclist) Battalion, Royal Sussex Regiment
- 1st Battalion, Prince of Wales's Volunteers (South Lancashire Regiment)
- 1/4th Battalion, Queen's Own (Royal West Kent Regiment)
- 2nd Battalion, Prince of Wales's (North Staffordshire Regiment)
- 1st Battalion, Durham Light Infantry
- 1/25th (County of London) Cyclist Battalion, London Regiment
- 1/1st Kent Cyclist Battalion

Pursuant to Governor General's Order 193/26:

- 1st Duke of York's Own Skinner's Horse
- 2nd Lancers (Gardner's Horse)
- 6th Duke of Connaught's Own Lancers (Watson's Horse)
- 7th Light Cavalry
- 8th King George's Own Light Cavalry
- 11th Prince Albert Victor's Own Cavalry (Frontier Force)
- 12th Cavalry (Frontier Force)
- 13th Duke of Connaught's Own Lancers
- 15th Lancers
- 16th Light Cavalry
- 17th Queen Victoria's Own Poona Horse
- 103rd (Peshawar) Pack Battery (Frontier Force) (Howitzer)
- 107th (Bengal) Pack Battery (Howitzer)
- 108th (Lahore) Pack Battery
- 115th (Jhelum) Pack Battery
- Queen Victoria's Own Madras Sappers and Miners
- King George's Own Bengal Sappers and Miners
- Royal Bombay Sappers and Miners
- Burma Sappers and Miners
- 1st Madras Pioneers
- 2nd Bombay Pioneers
- 3rd Sikh Pioneers
- 1st Punjab Regiment
- 2nd Punjab Regiment
- 4th Bombay Grenadiers
- 5th Maratha Light Infantry
- 6th Rajputana Rifles
- 7th Rajput Regiment
- 8th Punjab Regiment
- 9th Jat Regiment
- 10th Baluch Regiment
- 11th Sikh Regiment
- 12th Frontier Force Regiment
- 13th Frontier Force Rifles
- 14th Punjab Regiment
- 16th Punjab Regiment
- 17th Dogra Regiment
- 18th Royal Garhwal Rifles
- 19th Hyderabad Regiment
- 1st King George V's Own Gurkha Rifles
- 2nd King Edward VII's Own Gurkha Rifles (The Sirmoor Rifles)
- 4th Prince of Wales's Own Gurkha Rifles
- 7th Gurkha Rifles
- 8th Gurkha Rifles
- 9th Gurkha Rifles
- 10th Gurkha Rifles

Pursuant to Governor General's Order 1409/26:

- Patiala (Rajindra) Lancers
- Alwar Lancers
- Bhopal (Victoria) Lancers
- No 1 Kashmir Mountain Battery
- No 2 Kashmir Mountain Battery
- Faridkot Sappers
- Sirmoor Sappers
- Tehri Garhwal Sappers
- Malerkotla Sappers
- Jind Infantry
- Nabha Infantry
- 1st Patiala Infantry
- 1st Kashmir Infantry
- 3rd Gwalior Infantry
- Kapurthala Infantry (Jagatjit Regiment)
- Bharatpur Transport Corps
- Gwalior Transport Corps
- Holkar's Transport Corps (Indore)

Pursuant to Governor General's Order 1927:

- 3rd Queen Alexandra's Own Gurkha Rifles
- 5th Royal Gurkha Rifles (Frontier Force)
- 6th Gurkha Rifles

Many of these units did not exist at the time of the war but were formed as part of the reorganisation of the Indian Army in 1922; however, the decision was made to award the battle honour to the successor units of those involved in the war. The honour was not awarded to regiments that had been disbanded, e.g. 11th Gurkha Rifles, and not all units that took part in the war were awarded the battle honour, e.g. 1/5th Battalion, Hampshire Regiment.

== See also ==
- First Anglo-Afghan War
- Second Anglo-Afghan War
- Invasions of Afghanistan
- Waziristan campaign (1919–1920)
- Waziristan campaign (1921–1924)
- Waziristan campaign (1936–1939)
- Pink's War
- Battle of Bagh (1919)
- Military history of Afghanistan
- European influence in Afghanistan
- Military history of the United Kingdom
- Military history of the North-West Frontier
- Afghanistan–India relations
- Afghanistan–Pakistan relations
- Afghanistan–Nepal relations

== Notes ==
Footnotes

Citations
