= 1960 =

1960 in various calendars
- Gregorian calendar: 1960; MCMLX
- Ab urbe condita: 2713
- Armenian calendar: 1409; ԹՎ ՌՆԹ
- Assyrian calendar: 6710
- Baháʼí calendar: 116–117
- Balinese saka calendar: 1881–1882
- Bengali calendar: 1366–1367
- Berber calendar: 2910
- British Regnal year: 8 Eliz. 2 – 9 Eliz. 2
- Buddhist calendar: 2504
- Burmese calendar: 1322
- Byzantine calendar: 7468–7469
- Chinese calendar: 己亥年 (Earth Pig); 4657 or 4450 — to — 庚子年 (Metal Rat); 4658 or 4451
- Coptic calendar: 1676–1677
- Discordian calendar: 3126
- Ethiopian calendar: 1952–1953
- Hebrew calendar: 5720–5721
- Hindu calendars
- Vikram Samvat: 2016–2017
- Shaka Samvat: 1881–1882
- Kali Yuga: 5060–5061
- Holocene calendar: 11960
- Igbo calendar: 960–961
- Iranian calendar: 1338–1339
- Islamic calendar: 1379–1380
- Japanese calendar: Shōwa 35 (昭和３５年)
- Javanese calendar: 1891–1892
- Juche calendar: 49
- Julian calendar: Gregorian minus 13 days
- Korean calendar: 4293
- Minguo calendar: ROC 49 民國49年
- Nanakshahi calendar: 492
- Thai solar calendar: 2503
- Tibetan calendar: ས་མོ་ཕག་ལོ་ (female Earth-Boar); 2086 or 1705 or 933 — to — ལྕགས་ཕོ་བྱི་བ་ལོ་ (male Iron-Rat); 2087 or 1706 or 934

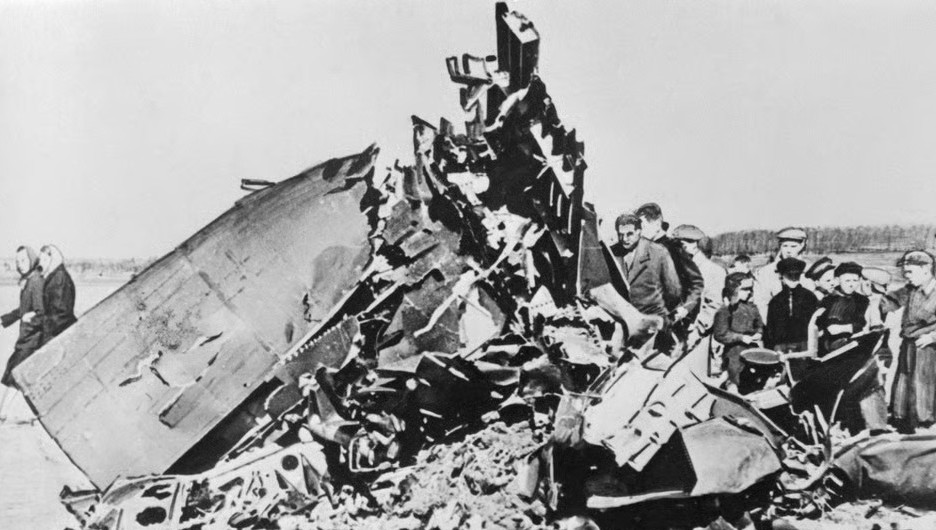
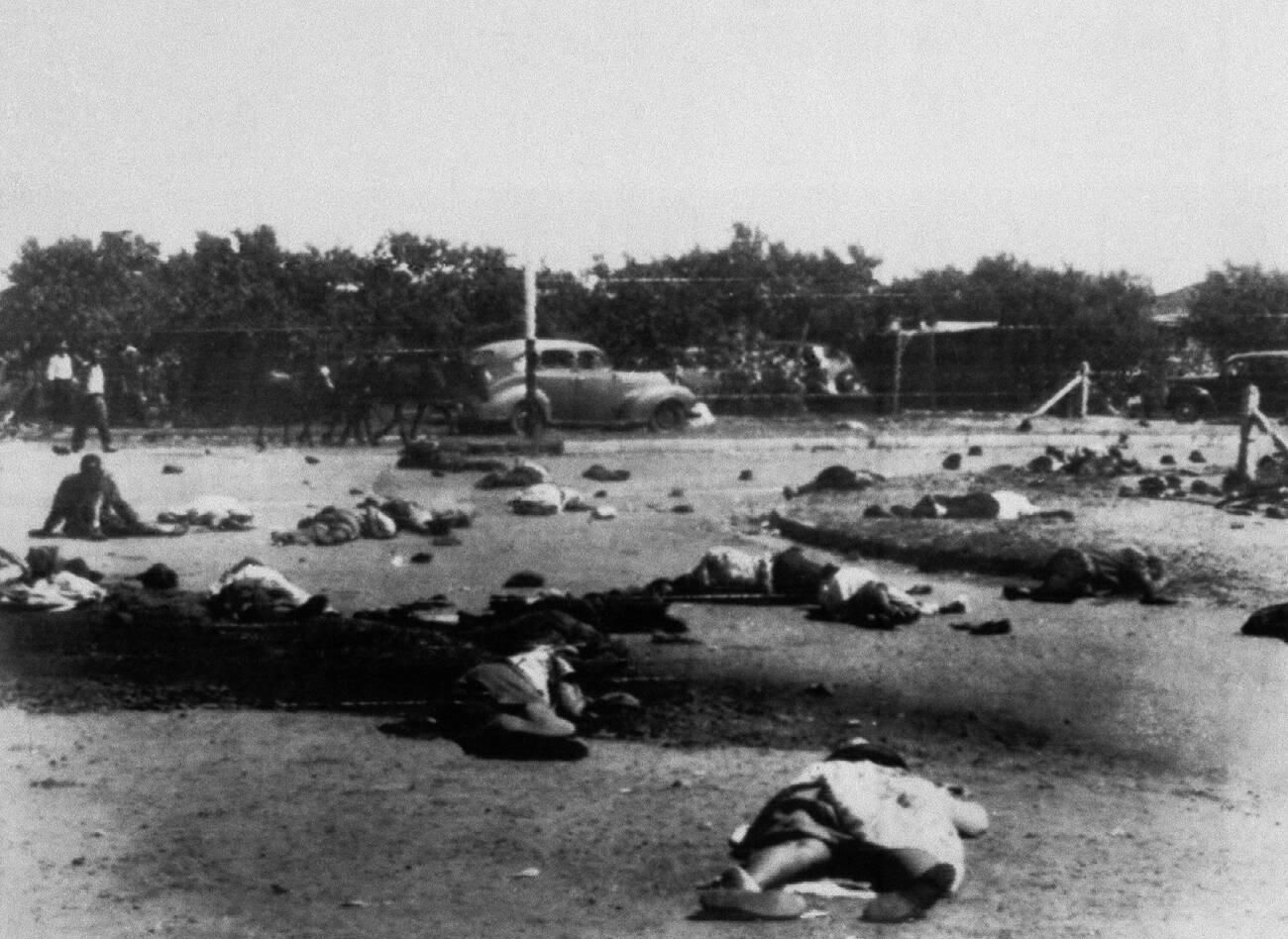
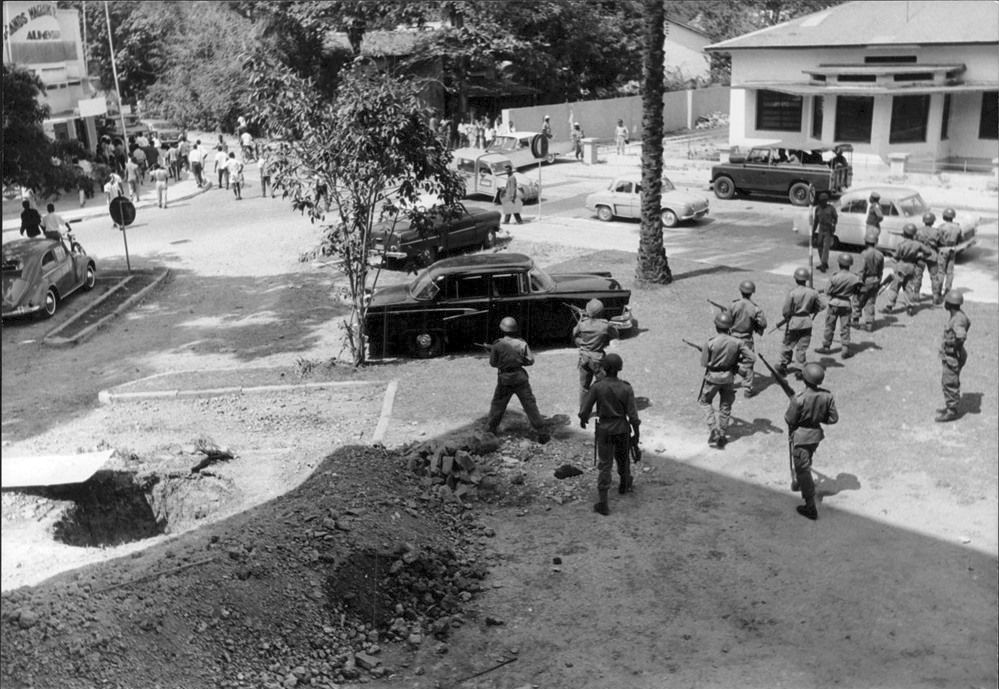
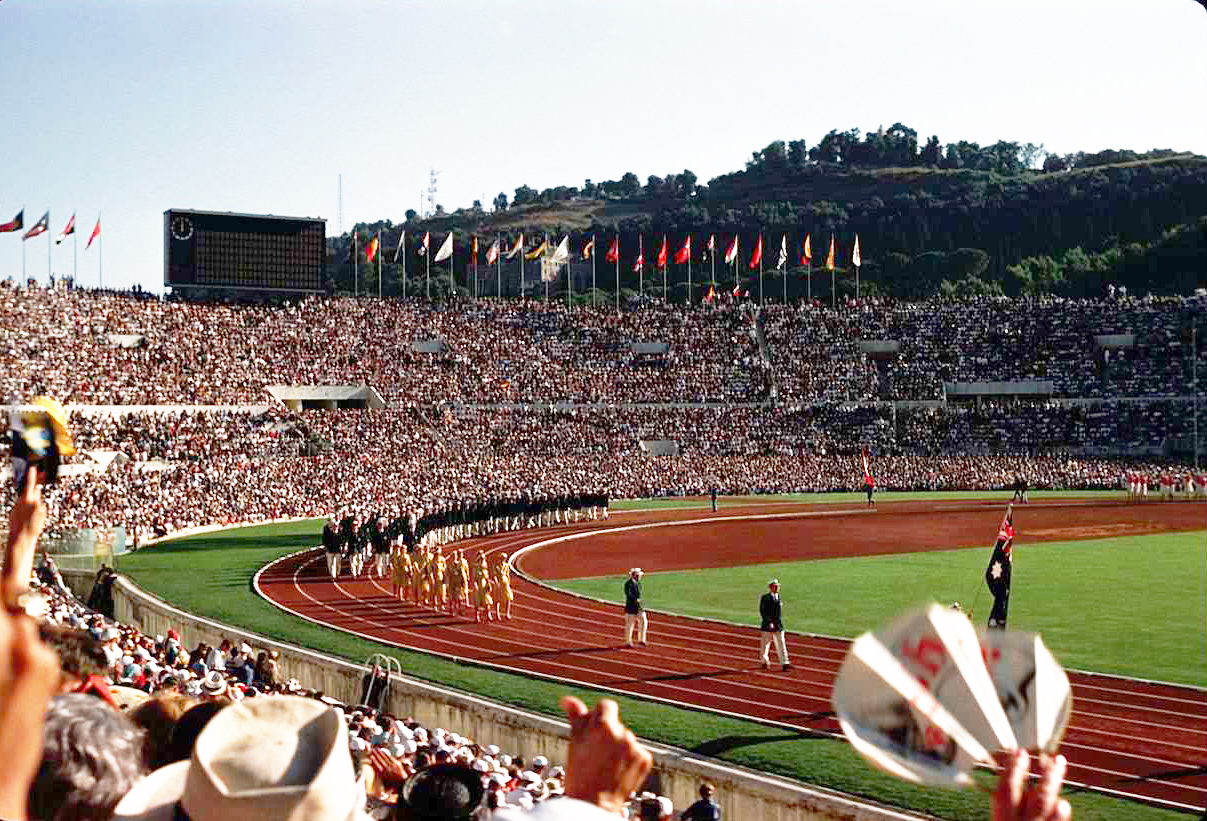
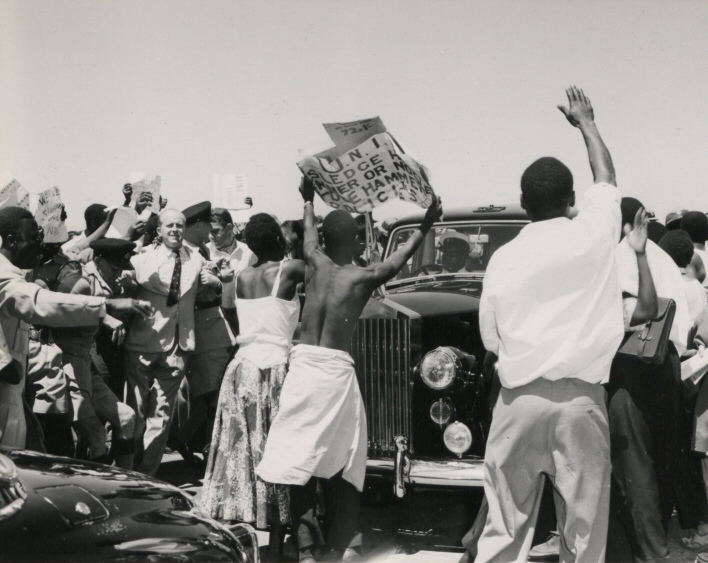
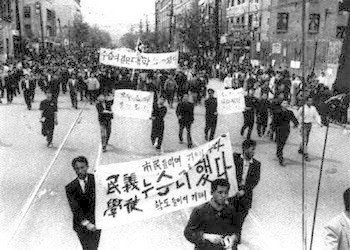
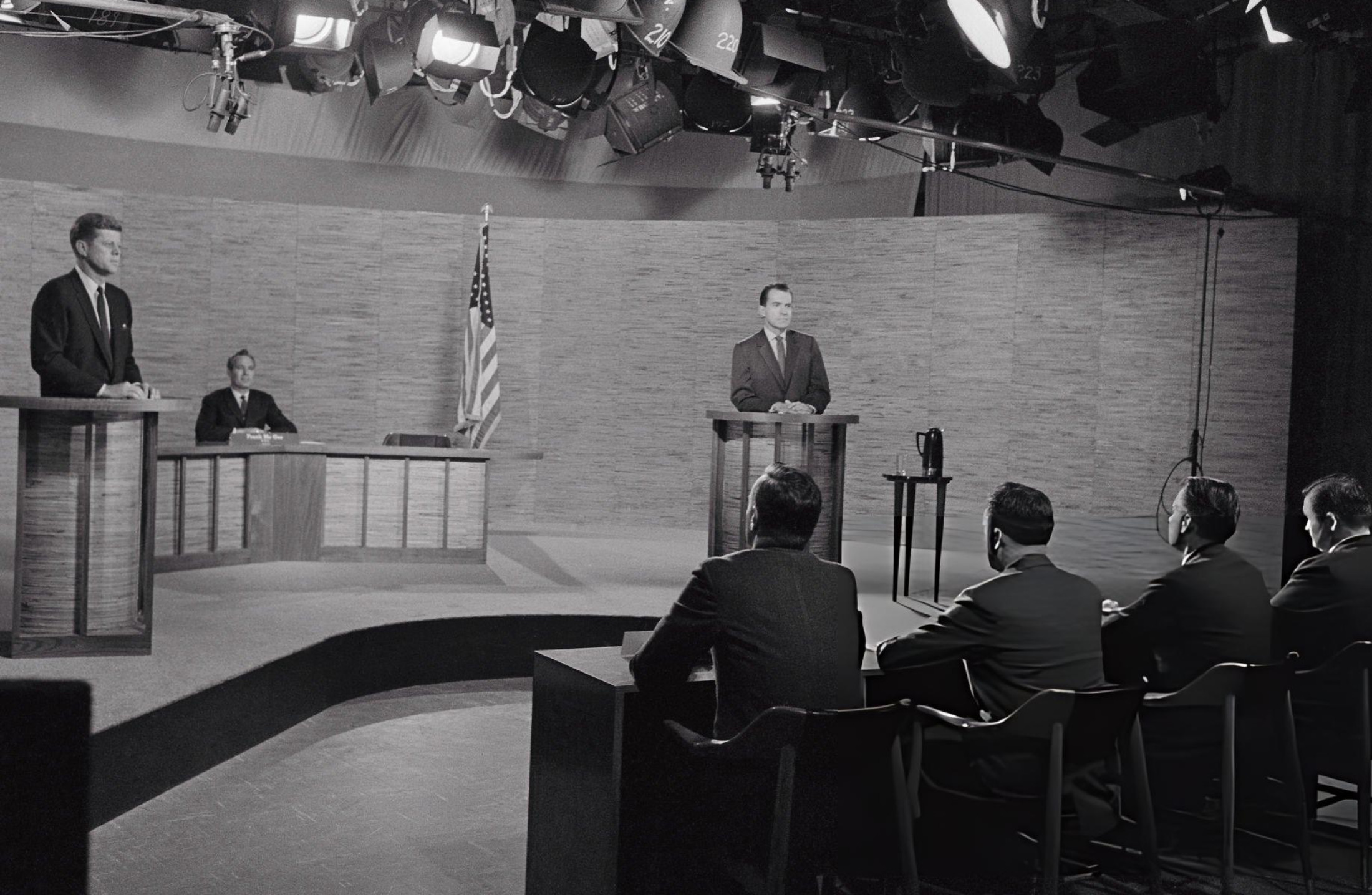
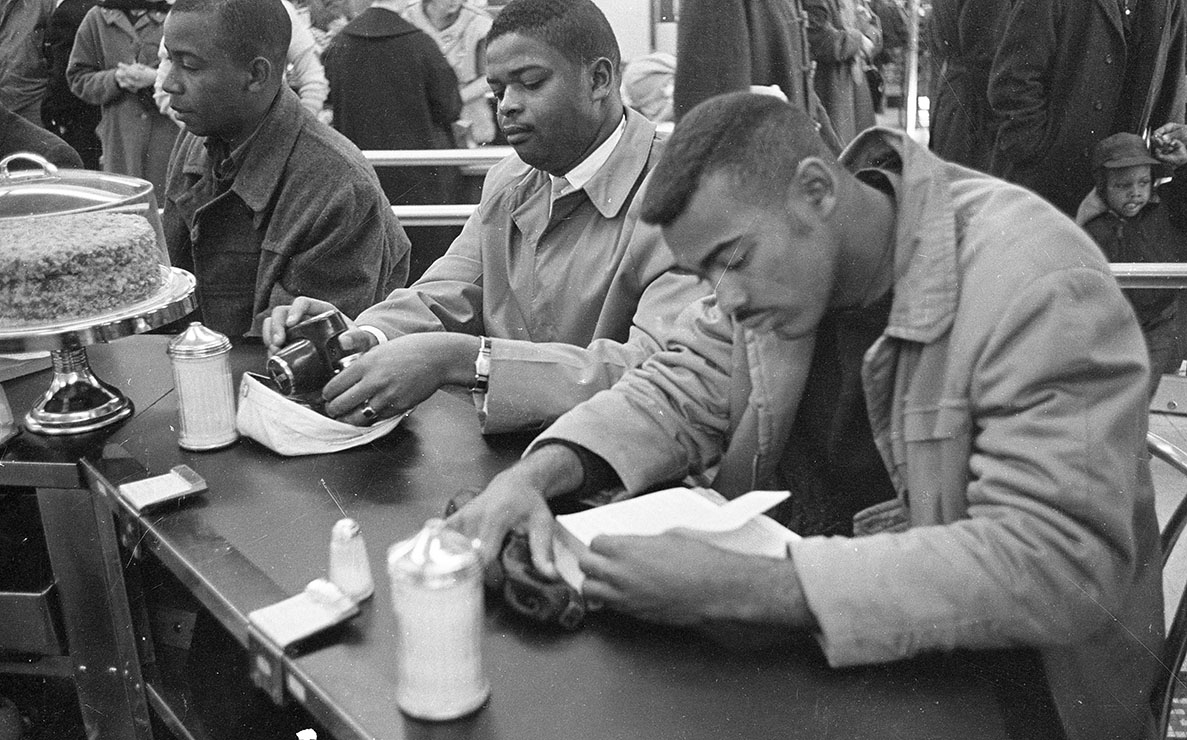
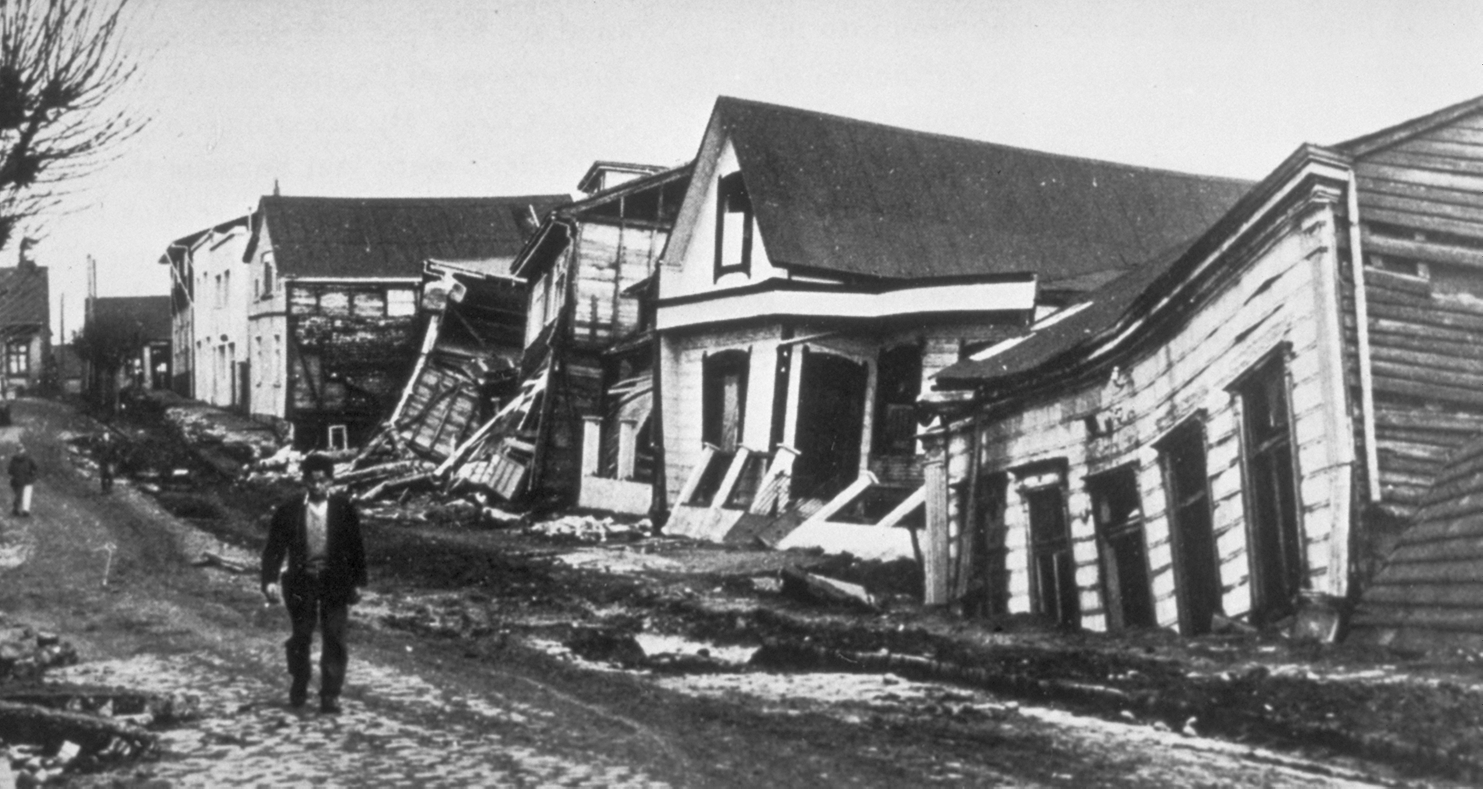
From top to bottom, left to right: the 1960 U-2 incident escalates Cold War tensions between the United States and the Soviet Union; the Sharpeville massacre shocks South Africa and draws global condemnation of apartheid; the Congo Crisis follows the independence of the Republic of the Congo from Belgium; the 1960 Summer Olympics are held in Rome; the Year of Africa sees 17 nations gain independence; the April Revolution in South Korea forces Syngman Rhee to resign; the 1960 United States presidential election results in the victory of John F. Kennedy over Richard Nixon; the Greensboro sit-ins begin in Greensboro, North Carolina; and the 1960 Valdivia earthquake devastates southern Chile with a 9.4-9.6 magnitude, becoming the strongest earthquake in history.

1960 (MCMLX) was a leap year starting on Friday of the Gregorian calendar, the 1960th year of the Common Era (CE) and Anno Domini (AD) designations, the 960th year of the 2nd millennium, the 60th year of the 20th century, and the 1st year of the 1960s decade.

It is also known as the "Year of Africa" because of major events—particularly the independence of seventeen African nations—that focused global attention on the continent and intensified feelings of Pan-Africanism. During the year, 17 colonies became independent, including 14 colonies from the French colonial empire, 2 from the British Empire, and 1 from Belgium.

== Events ==
=== January ===
- January 1 – Cameroon becomes independent from France.
- January 9 – Construction of the Aswan Dam begins in Egypt.
- January 10 – British Prime Minister Harold Macmillan makes the "Wind of Change" speech for the first time, to little publicity, in Accra, Gold Coast (modern-day Ghana).
- January 19 – A revised version of the Treaty of Mutual Cooperation and Security between the United States and Japan ("U.S.-Japan Security Treaty" or "Anpo (jōyaku)"), which allows U.S. troops to be based on Japanese soil, is signed in Washington, D.C. by Prime Minister Nobusuke Kishi and President Dwight D. Eisenhower. The new treaty is opposed by the massive Anpo protests in Japan.
- January 21
  - Coalbrook mining disaster: A coal mine collapses at Holly Country, South Africa, killing 435 miners.
  - Avianca Flight 671 crashes and burns upon landing at Montego Bay, Jamaica killing 37, the worst air disaster in Jamaica's history and the first for Avianca.
- January 22
  - Charles de Gaulle, President of France, dismisses Jacques Massu as commander-in-chief of French troops in Algeria.
  - Jacques Piccard and Don Walsh descend into the Mariana Trench in the bathyscaphe Trieste, reaching a depth of 10,911 meters (35,797 feet), and become the first human beings to reach the lowest spot on Earth.
- January 24 – A major insurrection occurs in Algiers against French colonial policy.

=== February ===
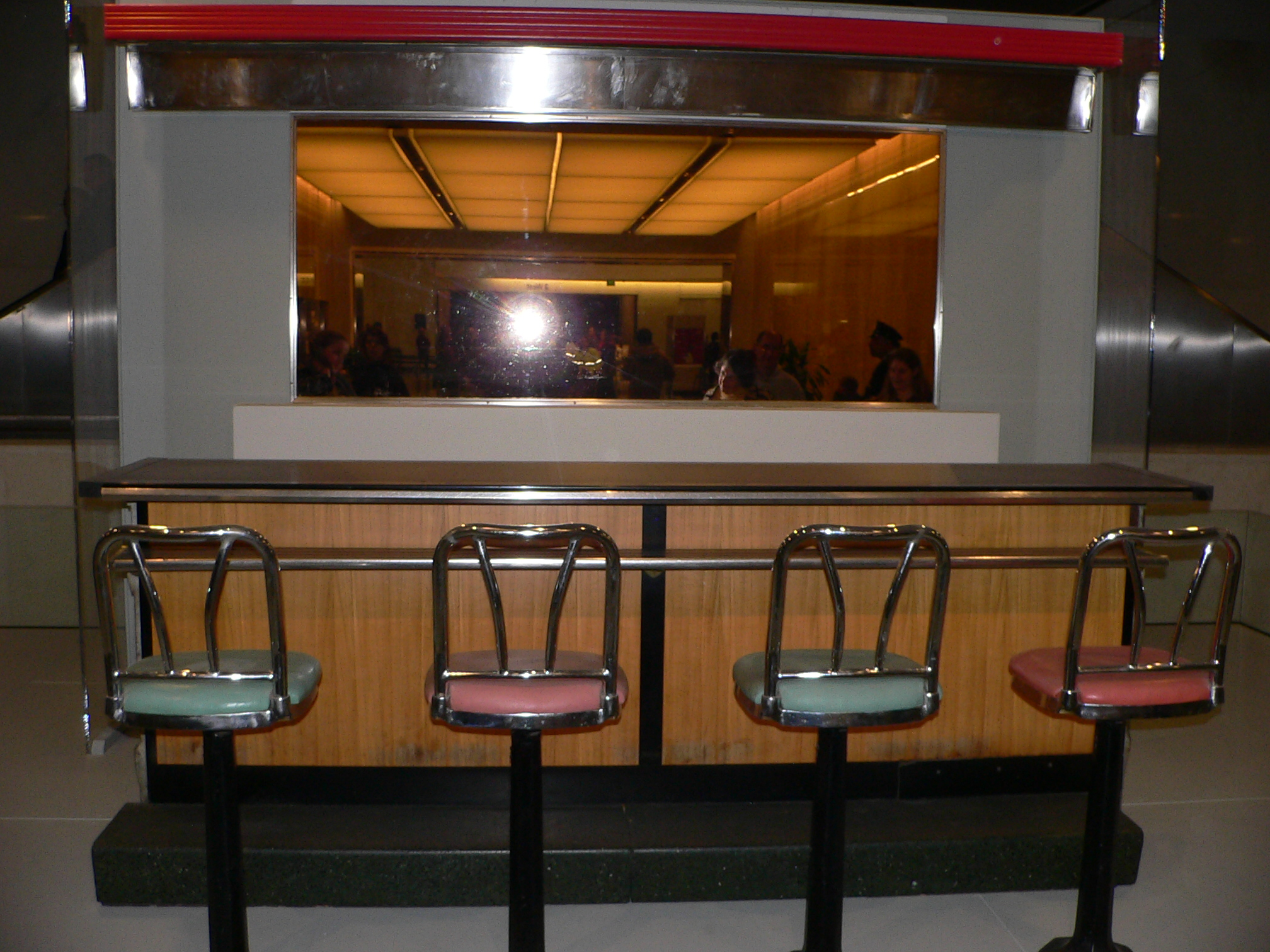
February 1: A section of lunch counter from the Greensboro, North Carolina Woolworth's where the Greensboro sit-ins began is now preserved in the Smithsonian Institution National Museum of American History

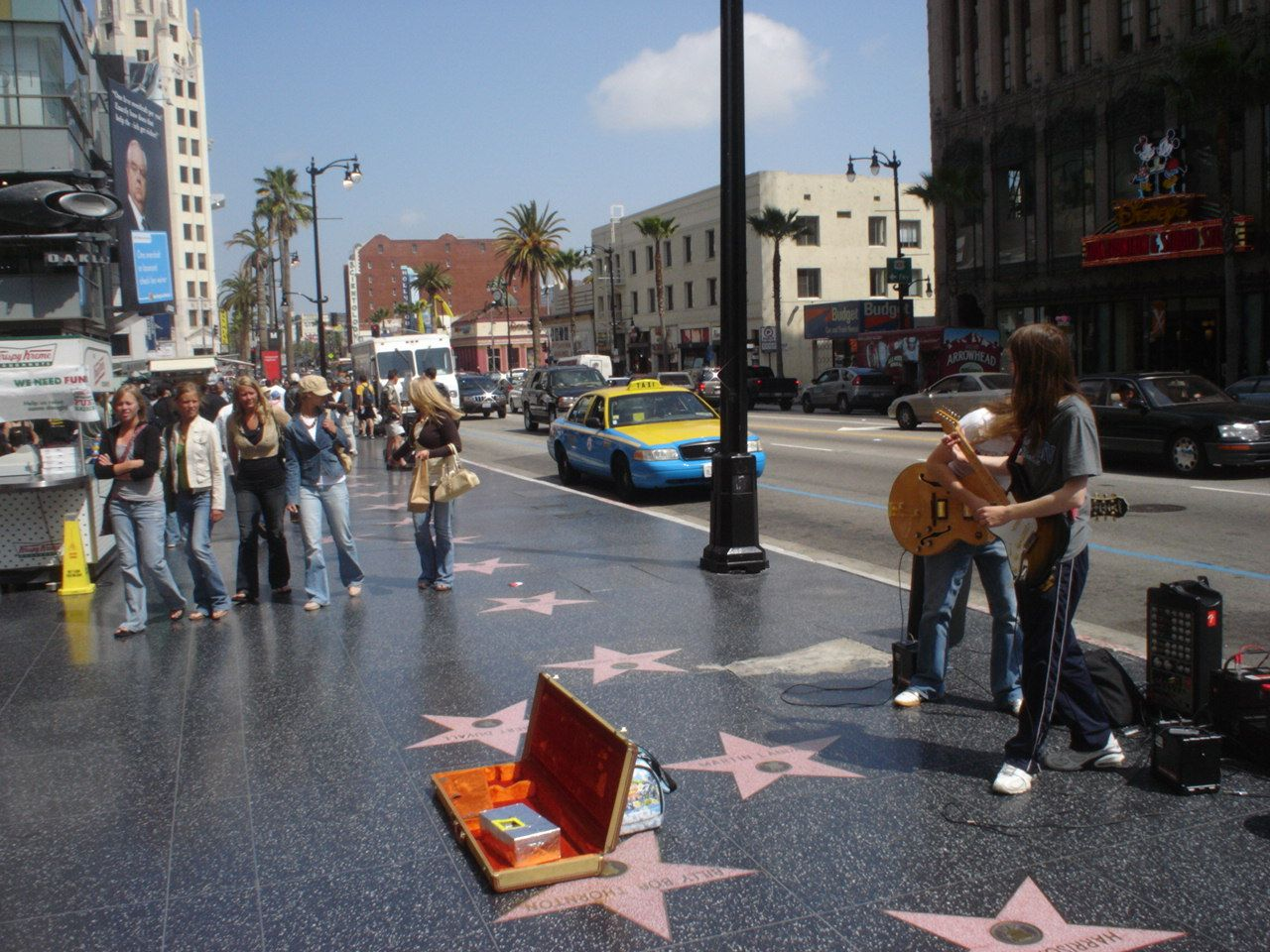
February 8: Hollywood Walk of Fame established

- February 1 – Greensboro sit-ins: In Greensboro, North Carolina, four black students from North Carolina Agricultural and Technical State University begin a sit-in at a segregated Woolworth's lunch counter. Although they are refused service, they are allowed to stay at the counter. The event triggers many similar non-violent protests throughout the Southern United States, and six months later the original four protesters are served lunch at the same counter.
- February 3 – Prime Minister of the United Kingdom Harold Macmillan makes the Wind of Change speech to the South African Parliament in Cape Town (although he had first made the speech, to little publicity, in Accra, Gold Coast – modern-day Ghana – on January 10).
- February 5 – The first CERN particle accelerator becomes operational in Geneva, Switzerland.
- February 8 – Hollywood Walk of Fame is established.
- February 10 – A conference about the proposed independence of the Belgian Congo begins in Brussels, Belgium.
- February 11 – China–India relations: Twelve Indian soldiers die in clashes with Red Chinese troops along their small common border.
- February 13 – Gerboise Bleue: France tests its first atomic bomb, in the Sahara Desert of Algeria.
- February 18 – The 1960 Winter Olympics begin at the Squaw Valley Ski Resort in Placer County, California.
- February 26 – Alitalia Flight 618: A Douglas DC 7 en route to New York crashes into a cemetery at Shannon, Ireland, shortly after takeoff, killing 34 of the 52 persons on board.
- February 29 – The 5.7 M_{w} Agadir earthquake shakes coastal Morocco with a maximum perceived intensity of X (Extreme), destroying Agadir and leaving 12,000 dead and another 12,000 injured.

=== March ===
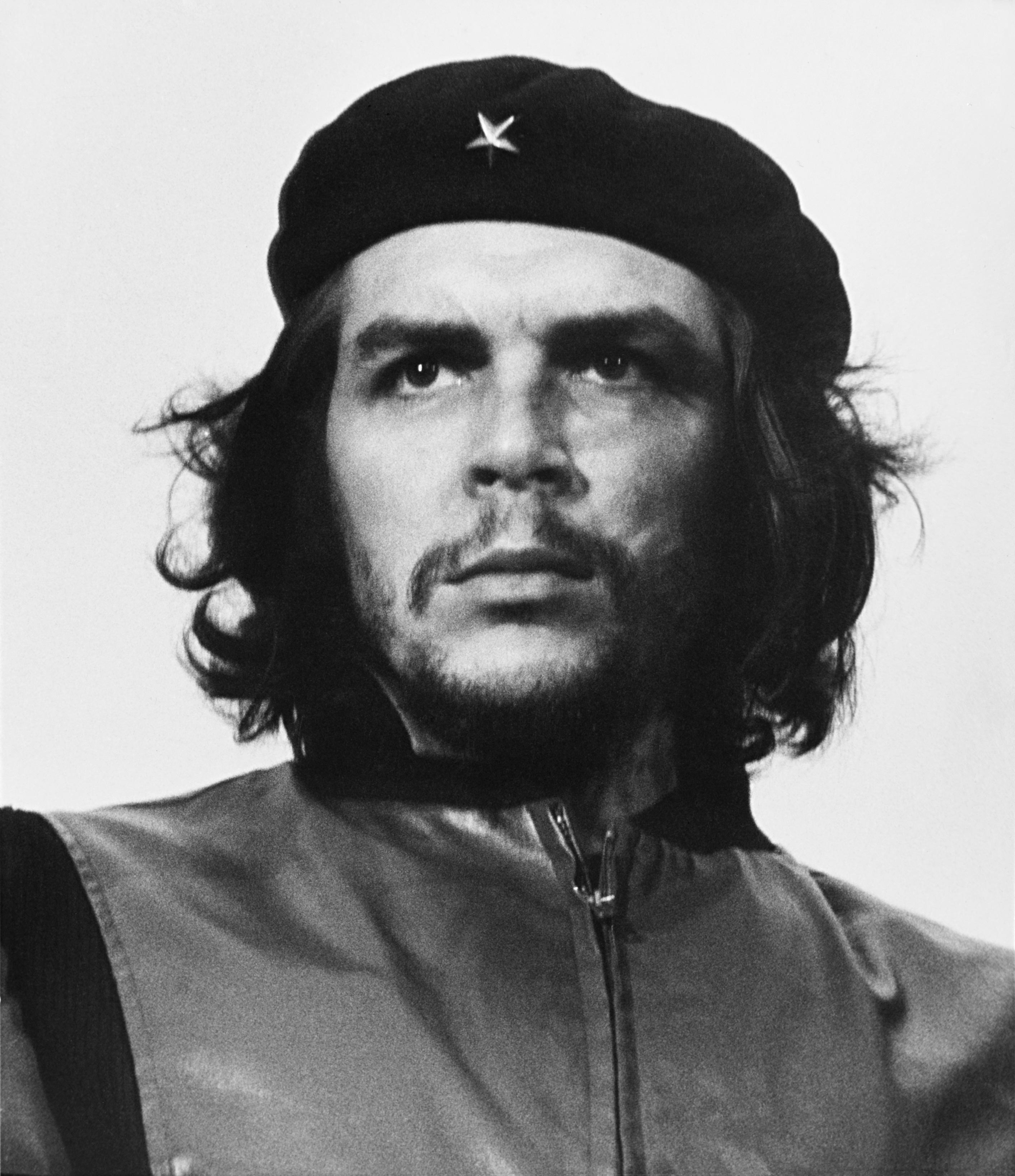
March 5: The iconic picture of Che Guevara

- March 5 – Alberto Korda takes his iconic photograph of Che Guevara, Guerrillero Heroico, in Havana.
- March 6
  - Vietnam War: The United States announces that 3,500 American soldiers will be sent to Vietnam.
  - The Canton of Geneva in Switzerland gives women the right to vote.
- March 17
  - Northwest Orient Airlines Flight 710 breaks up in flight and crashes near Tell City, Indiana, killing all 63 on board.
  - U.S. President Dwight D. Eisenhower approves a covert Central Intelligence Agency plan to train a paramilitary force against Cuba, which will result in the 1961 Bay of Pigs Invasion.
- March 21 – The Sharpeville massacre in South Africa results in more than 69 black protesters shot dead by police, 300 injured.
- March 22 – Arthur Leonard Schawlow and Charles Hard Townes receive the first patent for a laser, in the United States.
- March 23 – Soviet Premier Nikita Khrushchev meets French President Charles de Gaulle in Paris.
- March 29 – "Tom Pillibi" sung by 18-year-old Jacqueline Boyer (music by André Popp, lyrics by Pierre Cour) wins the Eurovision Song Contest 1960 (staged in London) for France.

=== April ===
April 1: TIROS-I prototype on display at the Smithsonian National Air and Space Museum

- April 1
  - Abdul Rahman of Negeri Sembilan, 1st Yang di-Pertuan Agong of Malaya (modern-day Malaysia), dies in office. He is replaced by Hisamuddin Alam Shah ibni Almarhum Sultan Alaeddin Sulaiman Shah, Sultan of Selangor.
  - The United States launches the first weather satellite, TIROS-1.
  - The 1960 United States census begins. There are 179,323,175 U.S. residents on this day. All people from Latin America are listed as white, including blacks from the Dominican Republic, European whites from Argentina and Mexicans who resemble Native Americans.
- April 4 – At the 32nd Academy Awards Ceremony, Ben-Hur wins a record 11 Oscars, including Best Picture.
- April 9 – White gunman David Pratt shoots South African Prime Minister Hendrik Verwoerd in Johannesburg, wounding him seriously.
- April 19 – April Revolution: South Korean students hold a nationwide pro-democracy protest against President Syngman Rhee, eventually leading him to resign from office.
- April 21 – In Brazil, the country's capital (Federal District) is relocated from the city of Rio de Janeiro to the new city, Brasília, in the highlands. The former Federal District, in which the city of Rio de Janeiro was situated, becomes the State of Guanabara.
- April 27 – Togo gains independence from France, with the French-administered United Nations Trust Territory being terminated.

=== May ===
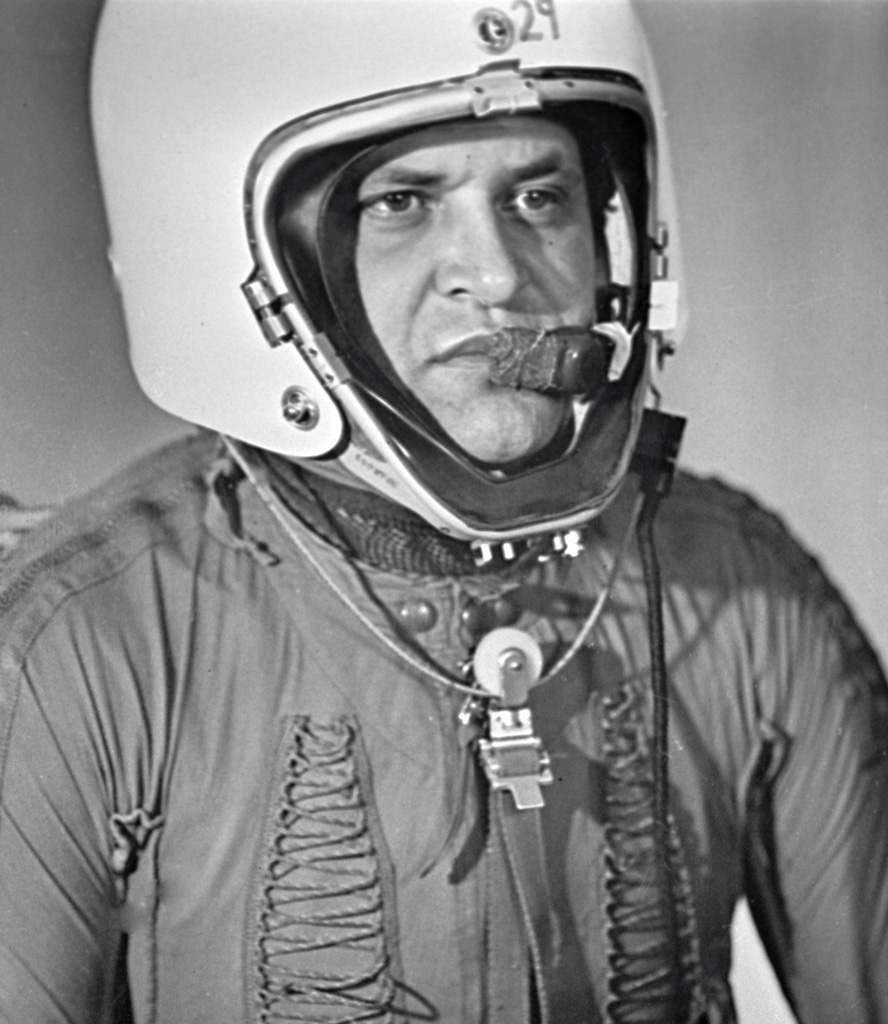
May 1: USSR shoots down U-2 spy plane and captures USAF spy pilot Gary Powers

- May 1 – The U-2 incident: Several Soviet surface-to-air missiles shoot down an American Lockheed U-2 spy plane over Russia. Its pilot, Francis Gary Powers of the Central Intelligence Agency, is captured.
- May 3 – The European Free Trade Association (EFTA) is established.
- May 4 – West German refugee minister Theodor Oberländer is dismissed because of his Nazi past.
- May 6 – United States President Dwight D. Eisenhower signs the Civil Rights Act of 1960 into law, primarily to protect against restrictions on the right to vote.
- May 9 – The United States Food and Drug Administration announces that it will approve birth control as an additional indication for Searle's Enovid, making it the world's first approved oral contraceptive pill.
- May 10 – The U.S. nuclear-powered submarine USS Triton, under the command of Captain Edward L. Beach Jr., completes the first underwater circumnavigation of the Earth (codenamed Operation Sandblast).
- May 11 – In Buenos Aires, four Mossad agents abduct fugitive Nazi German war criminal Adolf Eichmann in order that he can be taken to Israel and put on trial. This is announced on May 23 (the day after Eichmann's arrival in Israel) by Prime Minister of Israel David Ben-Gurion.
- May 13 – A joint Swiss and Austrian expedition makes the first ascent of the Asian mountain Dhaulagiri, the world's 7th highest.
- May 14 – The Kenya African National Union (KANU) is founded in Kenya, when 3 political parties join forces.
- May 15 – The satellite Sputnik 4 is launched into orbit by the Soviet Union.
- May 16
  - Soviet Premier Nikita Khrushchev demands an apology from President Dwight D. Eisenhower for U-2 reconnaissance plane flights over the Soviet Union, thus aborting their summit meeting scheduled for Paris this year.
  - Theodore Maiman operates the first laser.
- May 18 – Real Madrid beat Eintracht Frankfurt 7–3 at Hampden Park, Glasgow, and win the 1959–60 European Cup in Association football, their 5th successive victory in the competition.
- May 22 – The 9.5 M_{w} Valdivia earthquake affects Chile with a maximum Mercalli intensity of XII (Extreme). This megathrust earthquake ruptures from Arauco to Chiloé Archipelago, causing the most powerful earthquake on record and a destructive basin-wide tsunami.
- May 27 – In Turkey, a bloodless military coup d'état removes President Celâl Bayar, and installs General Cemal Gürsel as the head of state.
- May 30 – Cemal Gürsel forms the new government of Turkey (its 24th government, composed mostly of so-called "technocrats").

=== June ===
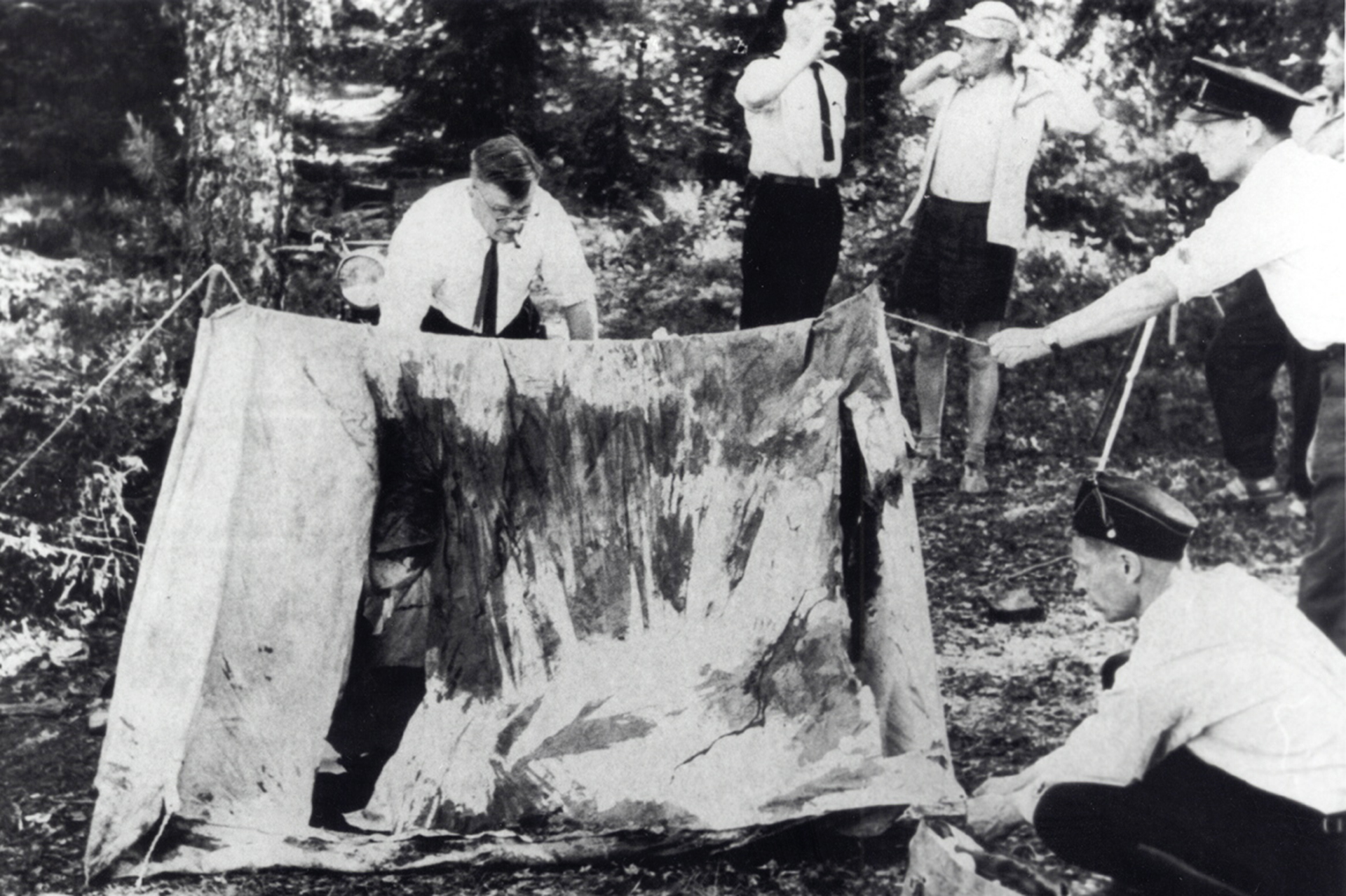
June 5: Investigating the campers' tent after the Lake Bodom murders in Finland

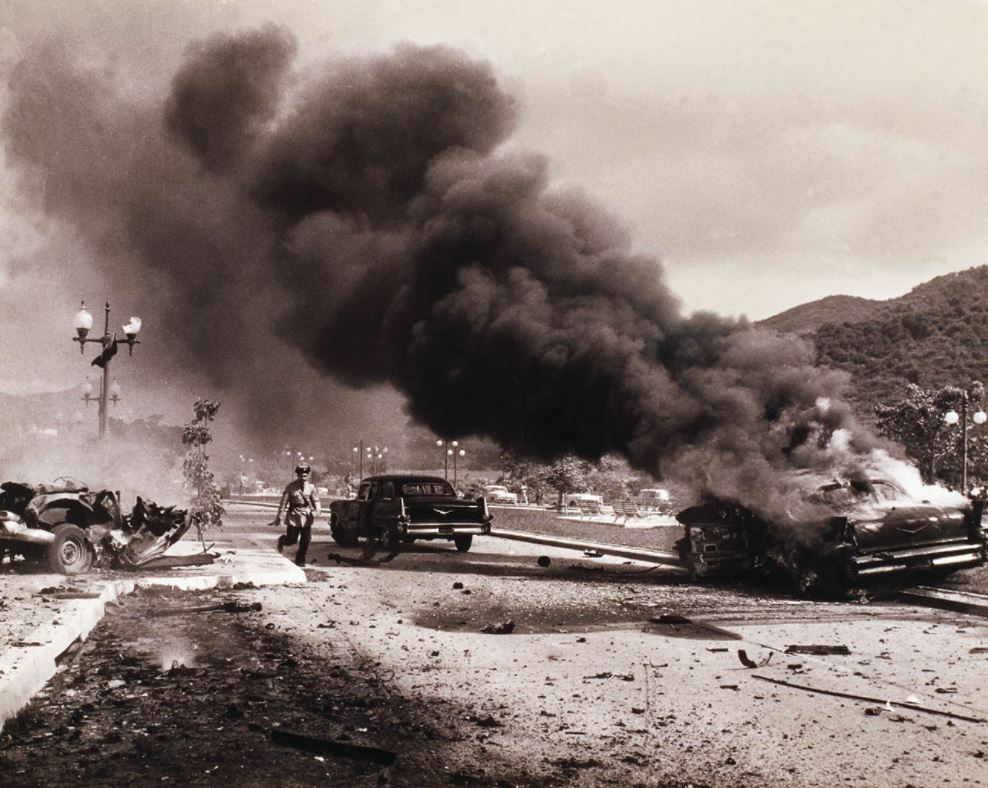
June 24: Explosion in Caracas during the attempted assassination of Venezuelan President Rómulo Betancourt

- June 1 – New Zealand's first television station begins broadcasting, in the city of Auckland.
- June 5
  - The Lake Bodom murders occur in Finland: three teenagers are brutally murdered in a tent; no-one is ever convicted of the crime.
  - The First Vatican Council, adjourned in 1870, is officially closed.
- June 9 – 1960 Pacific typhoon season: Typhoon Mary kills 1,600 people in China.
- June 10 – The "Hagerty Incident": As part of the ongoing Anpo protests in Japan against the U.S.-Japan Security Treaty, a car carrying Dwight D. Eisenhower's press secretary James Hagerty and U.S. Ambassador to Japan Douglas MacArthur II is mobbed by protesters outside of Tokyo's Haneda Airport, requiring the occupants to be rescued by a U.S. Marine helicopter.
- June 15
  - The "June 15 Incident": As part of the massive Anpo protests against the U.S.-Japan Security Treaty in Japan, radical student activists from the Zengakuren student federation attempt to storm the National Diet compound, precipitating a battle with police in which female Tokyo University student Michiko Kanba is killed.
  - The BC Ferries company, later to become the second-largest ferry operator in the world, commences service between Tsawwassen and Swartz Bay, British Columbia, Canada.
- June 19 – The new U.S.–Japan Security Treaty is automatically ratified 30 days after passing the Lower House of the Diet.
- June 20
  - The short-lived Mali Federation, consisting of the Sudanese Republic (modern-day Republic of Mali) and Senegal, gains independence from France.
  - Floyd Patterson becomes the first person to regain the world heavyweight boxing championship, with a knock-out of Ingemar Johansson in New York City.
- June 22 – 1960 Quebec general election: the ruling Union nationale, led by Antonio Barrette, is defeated by the Quebec Liberal Party, led by Jean Lesage, beginning the 'Quiet Revolution' in the historically conservative Canadian province.
- June 23 – Japanese prime minister Nobusuke Kishi announces his resignation.
- June 24
  - Joseph Kasa-Vubu is elected as the first President of the independent Democratic Republic of the Congo.
  - Attempted assassination of Rómulo Betancourt, the Venezuelan President, by a car bomb planted at the Paseo Los Próceres in Caracas, allegedly at the orders of Dominican dictator Rafael Trujillo.
- June 26
  - The State of Somaliland (the former British Somaliland protectorate) receives its independence from the United Kingdom. Five days later, it unites as scheduled with the Trust Territory of Somalia (the former Italian Somaliland), to form the Somali Republic.
  - The Malagasy Republic (Madagascar) becomes independent from France.
- June 28 – King Bhumibol Adulyadej of Thailand arrives in Washington, D.C. for a 4-day royal visit to the U.S.
- June 30
  - The Belgian Congo receives its independence from Belgium, as the Republic of the Congo (Léopoldville). A civil war follows shortly.
  - Public demonstrations by democratic and left forces against Italian government support of the post-fascist Italian Social Movement are heavily suppressed by police.

=== July ===
- July 1
  - Ghana becomes a republic, and Kwame Nkrumah becomes its first President.
  - Cold War: A Soviet Air Force MiG-19 fighter plane flying north of Murmansk, Russia, over the Barents Sea, shoots down a six-man RB-47 Stratojet reconnaissance plane of the U.S. Air Force. Four of the U.S. Air Force officers are killed, and the two survivors are held prisoner in the Soviet Union.
  - The Trust Territory of Somaliland (the former Italian Somaliland) gains its independence from Italy. Concurrently, it unites as scheduled with the five-day-old State of Somaliland (the former British Somaliland) to form the Somali Republic.
- July 3 – The French Grand Prix is won by Australian Jack Brabham driving a Cooper T53.
- July 4 – Following the admission of the State of Hawaii as the 50th state in August 1959, the new (and continuing) 50-star flag of the United States is first officially flown over Philadelphia.
- July 10 – The Soviet Union national football team defeats the Yugoslavia national football team 2–1 in Paris to win the first UEFA European Championship.
- July 11 – Congo Crisis: Moise Tshombe declares the Congolese province of Katanga independent. He requests and receives help from Belgium.
- July 12 – Chin Peng is exiled from Malaya to Thailand, and the Malayan state of emergency is lifted.
- July 14 – The United Nations Security Council decides to send troops to Katanga to oversee the withdrawal of Belgian troops.
- July 20 – Ceylon elects Mrs. Sirimavo Bandaranaike as its Prime Minister, the world's first elected female head of government (she takes office the following day).
- July 21 – English navigator Francis Chichester wins the first Single-Handed Trans-Atlantic Race, arriving in New York aboard Gypsy Moth III having made a record solo Atlantic crossing in 40 days.
- July 25 – The Woolworth Company's lunch counter in Greensboro, North Carolina, the location of a sit-in that has sparked demonstrations by Negroes across the Southern United States, serves a meal to its first black customer.
- July 25–28 – In Chicago, the 1960 Republican National Convention nominates Vice President Richard Nixon as its candidate for President of the United States, and Henry Cabot Lodge Jr. for vice-president.

=== August ===
- August 1 – Dahomey (modern-day Benin) becomes independent from France.
- August 3 – Niger becomes independent from France.
- August 5 – Upper Volta (modern-day Burkina Faso) becomes independent from France.
- August 6 – In the Republic of the Congo (Léopoldville) (later the Democratic Republic of the Congo), Albert Kalonji declares the independence of the Autonomous State of South Kasai.
- August 7
  - The Ivory Coast becomes independent from France.
  - The world's first standard gauge passenger preserved railway, the Bluebell Railway, opens to the public in southern England.
- August 9 – The government of Laos is overthrown in a coup.
- August 11 – Chad becomes independent from France.
- August 13 – Ubangi-Shari becomes independent from France, as the Central African Republic. It later becomes the Central African Empire.
- August 15 – Middle Congo becomes independent from France, as the Republic of Congo (Congo-Brazzaville).
- August 16
  - The Mediterranean island of Cyprus receives its independence from the United Kingdom.
  - United States Air Force pilot Joseph Kittinger parachutes from a balloon over New Mexico at an altitude of about 102,800 feet (31,300 meters) as part of Project Excelsior. Kittinger sets world records for: high-altitude jump; free-fall by falling 16.0 miles (25.7 kilometers) before opening his parachute; first space dive, and fastest speed attained by a human being without mechanical or chemical assistance, about 982 k.p.h (614 m.p.h.). Kittinger survives more or less uninjured. (He becomes the first man to make a solo crossing of the Atlantic Ocean in a gas balloon, and is the first man fully to witness the spherical curvature of the Earth. Felix Baumgartner breaks his space diving record in 2012.)
- August 17
  - Gabon becomes independent from France.
  - The trial of American U-2 pilot Gary Powers begins in Moscow.
- August 19 – In the Soviet Union:
  - Cold War: American U-2 pilot Gary Powers is sentenced in Moscow to 10 years in prison for espionage.
  - Sputnik program: The satellite Sputnik 5 is launched, with the dogs Belka and Strelka (the Russian for "Squirrel" and "Little Arrow"), 40 mice, two rats and a variety of plants. This satellite returns to Earth the next day and all animals are recovered safely.
- August 20 – Senegal breaks away from the Mali Federation, declaring its independence.
- August 25 – The 1960 Summer Olympic Games begin in Rome.
- August 29 – Hurricane Donna kills 50 people in Florida and New England, United States.

=== September ===
- September 1
  - Sultan Hisamuddin Alam Shah, Sultan of Selangor and 2nd Yang di-Pertuan Agong of Malaya, dies in office. He is replaced by Tuanku Syed Putra, Raja of Perlis.
  - Disgruntled railroad workers effectively halt operations of the Pennsylvania Railroad in the United States, marking the first shutdown in the company's history (the event lasts two days).
- September 2 – The first elections of the Parliament of the Central Tibetan Administration (in exile in India) are held. The Tibetan community observes this date as Democracy Day.
- September 5
  - 1960 Summer Olympic Games: Cassius Clay (later Muhammad Ali) of the United States wins the gold medal in light-heavyweight boxing. He makes his professional debut on October 29.
  - Congolese President Joseph Kasa-Vubu dismisses Patrice Lumumba's entire government, and also places Lumumba under house arrest.
  - Poet Léopold Sédar Senghor is the first elected President of Senegal.
- September 6 – Martin and Mitchell defection: William Hamilton Martin and Bernon F. Mitchell, two American cryptologists, announce their defection to the Soviet Union at a press conference in Moscow.
- September 8 – In Huntsville, Alabama, U.S. President Dwight D. Eisenhower formally dedicates the Marshall Space Flight Center (which had been activated by NASA on July 1).
- September 10 – 1960 Summer Olympic Games: Abebe Bikila of Ethiopia wins the gold medal in the marathon, running barefoot in a world time, and becoming the first person from Sub-Saharan Africa to win Olympic gold.
- September 14
  - Colonel Joseph Mobutu takes power in Republic of the Congo via a military coup.
  - OPEC, the Organization of Petroleum Exporting Countries is founded as an intergovernmental producers' cartel by Iran, Iraq, Kuwait, Saudi Arabia and Venezuela.
- September 18 – The first international Summer Paralympics open in Rome under the title "9th International Stoke Mandeville Games", the first quadrennial paralympic event outside of England.
- September 21 – Mexican President Adolfo López Mateos nationalizes the country's electricity supply system.
- September 22 – Mali, the sole remaining member of the "Mali Federation" (following the withdrawal of Senegal one month earlier), declares its full independence as the Republic of Mali.
- September 26 – 1960 United States presidential debates: The two leading candidates in the 1960 United States presidential election, John F. Kennedy and Richard Nixon, participate in the first live televised presidential debate.
- September 29 – At the United Nations General Assembly, Soviet leader Nikita Khrushchev angrily interrupts British Prime Minister Harold Macmillan, banging the desk and shouting in Russian. Macmillan drily says "I should like that to be translated, if I may".
- September 30 – Hanna-Barbera's animated sitcom The Flintstones premieres on ABC television in the United States.

=== October ===
- October 1 – Nigeria becomes independent from the United Kingdom, and Nnamdi Azikiwe becomes its first native-born Governor General.
- October 3 – Jânio Quadros is elected President of Brazil, for a five-year term.
- October 7 – Nigeria becomes the 99th member of the United Nations.
- October 12 – Cold War: Shoe-banging incident – Soviet Premier Nikita Khrushchev pounds his shoe on a desk at a meeting of the United Nations General Assembly, his way of protesting the discussion of the Soviet Union's policies toward Eastern Europe. In summarily adjourning the meeting, Assembly President Frederick Boland (Ireland) slams his gavel, Thor's gavel, down so hard that it breaks.
- October 14
  - Presidential candidate John F. Kennedy first suggests the idea for the Peace Corps of the United States.
  - The Premier of New South Wales officially opens Warragamba Dam, one of the world's largest domestic water supply dams.
- October 24 – Nedelin catastrophe: A large rocket explodes on the launch pad at the Baikonur Cosmodrome, killing at least 92 people of the Soviet space program.
- c. October 31 – Very Severe Cyclonic Storm Ten makes landfall in East Pakistan, followed by a storm surge, just three weeks after a previous storm devastated the country.

=== November ===
- November 8 – 1960 United States presidential election: In a close race, Democratic U. S. Senator John F. Kennedy is elected over Republican U. S. Vice President Richard Nixon, to become (at 43) the second youngest man to serve as President of the United States, and the youngest man elected to this position.
- November 14
  - Belgium threatens to leave the United Nations over criticism of its policy concerning the Republic of the Congo.
  - Stéblová train disaster: A head-on collision between two trains in Pardubice, Czechoslovakia, kills 118 people.
- November 22 – The United Nations supports the government of Joseph Kasavubu and Joseph Mobutu in the Republic of the Congo.
- November 26 – 1960 New Zealand general election: The National Party defeats the governing Labour Party after only three years in office. National leader Keith Holyoake becomes Prime Minister of New Zealand for a second time.
- November 28 – Mauritania becomes independent of France.

=== December ===
- December – The African and Malagasy Organisation for Economic Cooperation (OAMCE – Organisation Africain et Malagache de Coopération Économique) is established.
- December 1
  - Patrice Lumumba, deposed premier of the Republic of the Congo, is arrested by the troops of Colonel Joseph Mobutu.
  - A Soviet satellite containing live animals (dogs Pcholka and Mushka) and plants is launched into orbit. Due to a malfunction, it burns up during re-entry.
  - Striking coal miners at the Miike Coal Mine in Japan return to work, ending the unprecedented 312-day-long Miike Struggle.
- December 2 – U.S. President Dwight D. Eisenhower authorizes the use of $1.0 million for the relief and resettlement of Cuban refugees, who have been arriving in Florida at the rate of about 1,000 per week.
- December 4 – The admission of Mauritania to the United Nations is vetoed by the Soviet Union.
- December 7 – The United Nations Security Council is called into session by the Soviet Union, in order to consider Soviet demands for the Security Council to seek the immediate release of former Congolese Premier Patrice Lumumba.
- December 8 – For the first time, Mary Martin's Peter Pan is presented as a stand-alone 2-hour special on NBC television in the United States, instead of as part of an anthology series. This version, rather than being presented live, is shown on videotape, enabling NBC to repeat it as often as they wish without having to restage it. Although nearly all of the adult actors repeat their original Broadway roles, all of the original children have, ironically, outgrown their roles and are replaced by new actors.
- December 9 – French President Charles de Gaulle's visit to Algeria is bloodied by European and Muslim rioters in Algeria's largest cities. These riots cause 127 deaths.
- December 13
  - 1960 Ethiopian coup attempt: While Emperor Haile Selassie of Ethiopia visits Brazil, his Kebur Zabagna (Imperial Bodyguard) leads a military coup against his rule, proclaiming that the emperor's son, Crown Prince Asfaw Wossen Taffari, is the new emperor.
  - The countries of El Salvador, Guatemala, Honduras, and Nicaragua announce the formation of the Central American Common Market.
  - The U.S. Navy's Commander Leroy Heath (pilot) and Lieutenant Larry Monroe (bombardier/navigator) establish a world flight-altitude record of 91,450 feet (27,870 m), with payload, in an A-5 Vigilante bomber carrying 2,200 lb (1,000 kg), and better the previous world record by over four miles (6.4 km).
- December 14 – Antoine Gizenga proclaims in the Democratic Republic of the Congo that he has taken over as the country's premier.
- December 15
  - King Mahendra of Nepal deposes the democratic government in his country and takes direct control himself.
  - King Baudouin of Belgium marries Doña Fabiola de Mora y Aragón.
- December 16
  - U.S. Secretary of State Christian Herter announces that the United States will commit five nuclear submarines and eighty Polaris missiles to the defense of the NATO countries by the end of 1963.
  - New York mid-air collision: A United Air Lines DC-8 collides in mid-air with a TWA Lockheed Constellation over Staten Island in New York City. All 128 passengers and crewmembers on the two airliners, and six people on the ground, are killed.
- December 17 – Troops loyal to Emperor Haile Selassie in Ethiopia overcome the coup that began on December 13, returning the reins to the Emperor upon his return from a trip to Brazil. The Emperor absolves his own son of any guilt.
- December 19 – Fire sweeps through the USS Constellation, to become the U.S. Navy's largest aircraft carrier, while she is under construction at the Brooklyn Navy Yard; killing 50 workers and injuring 150.

=== World population ===
- World population: 3,021,475,000
  - Africa: 277,398,000
  - Asia: 1,701,336,000
  - Europe: 604,401,000
  - Latin America: 218,300,000
  - North America: 204,152,000
  - Oceania: 15,888,000

== Births ==
=== January ===
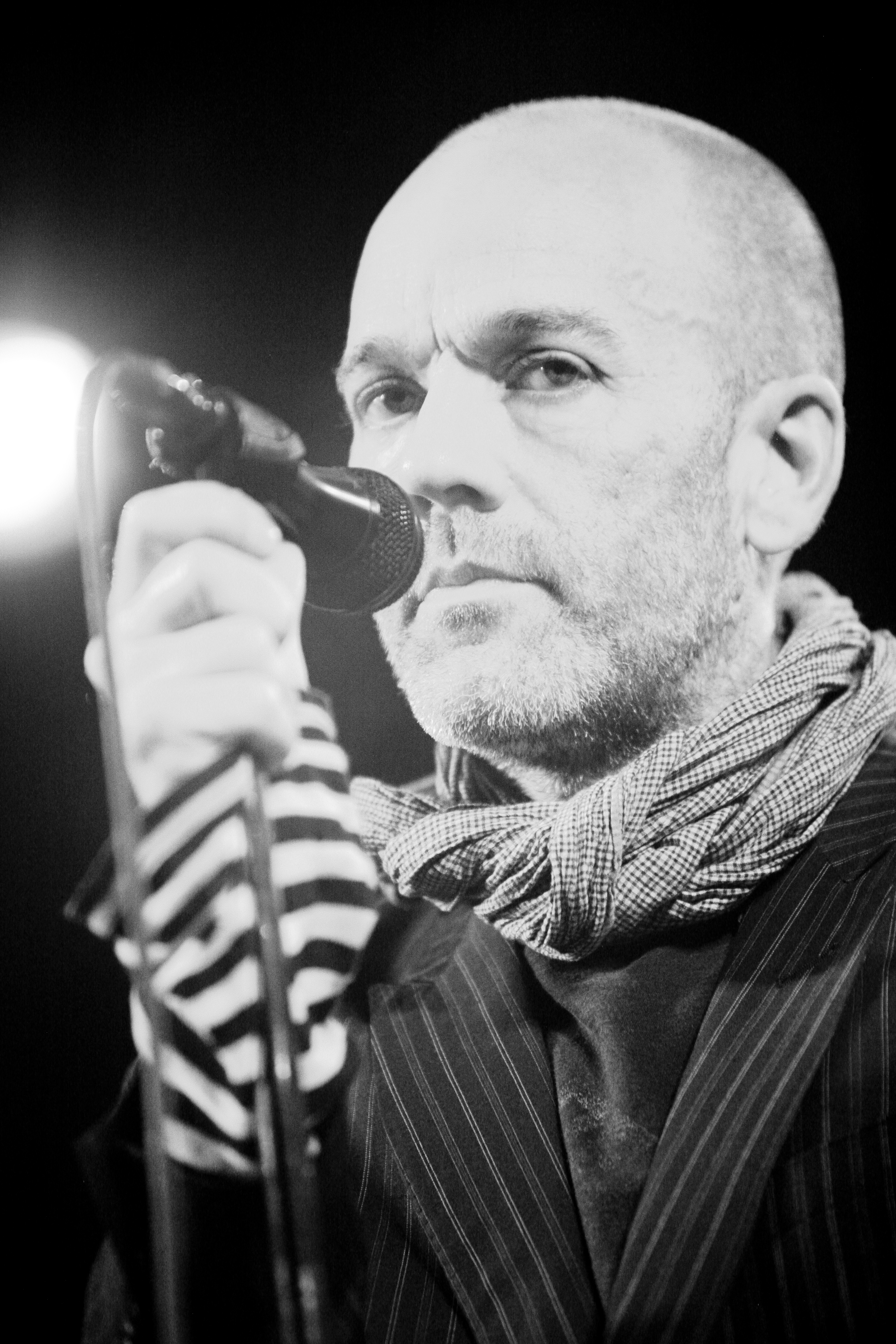
Michael Stipe

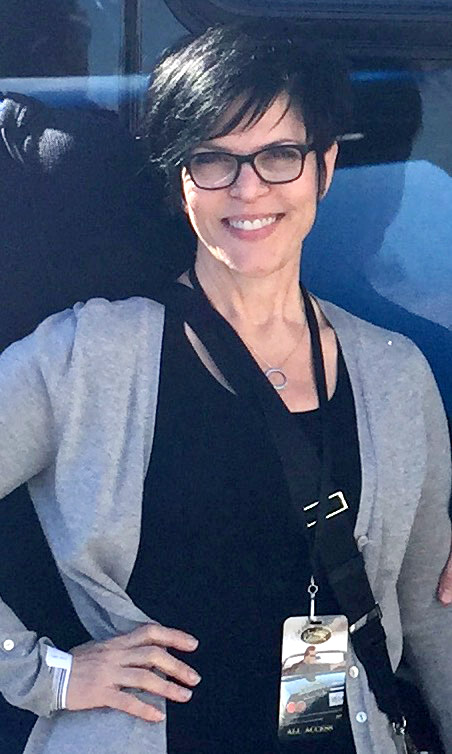
April Winchell

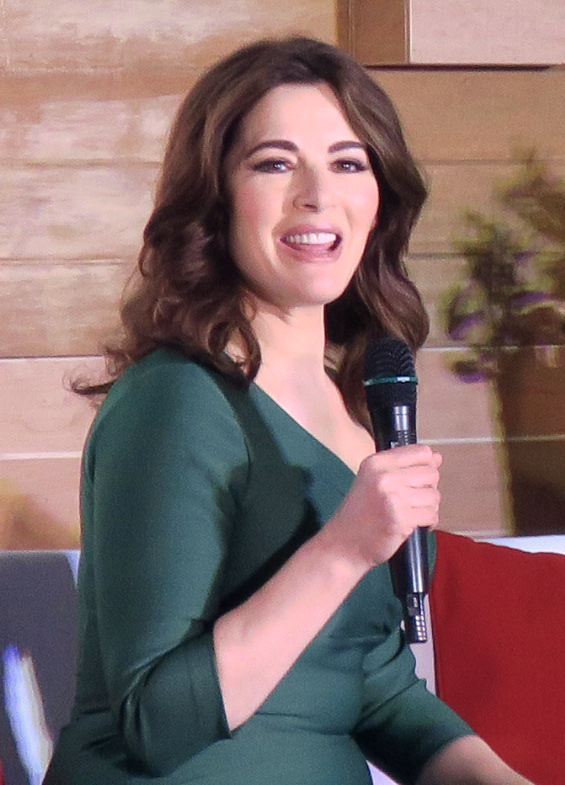
Nigella Lawson

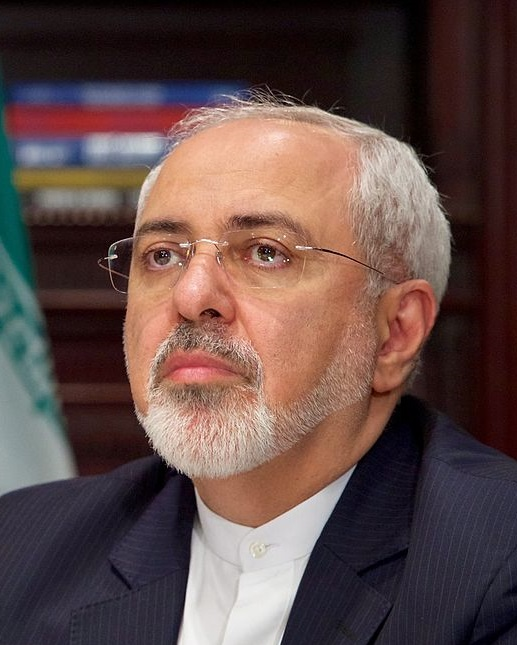
Mohammad Javad Zarif

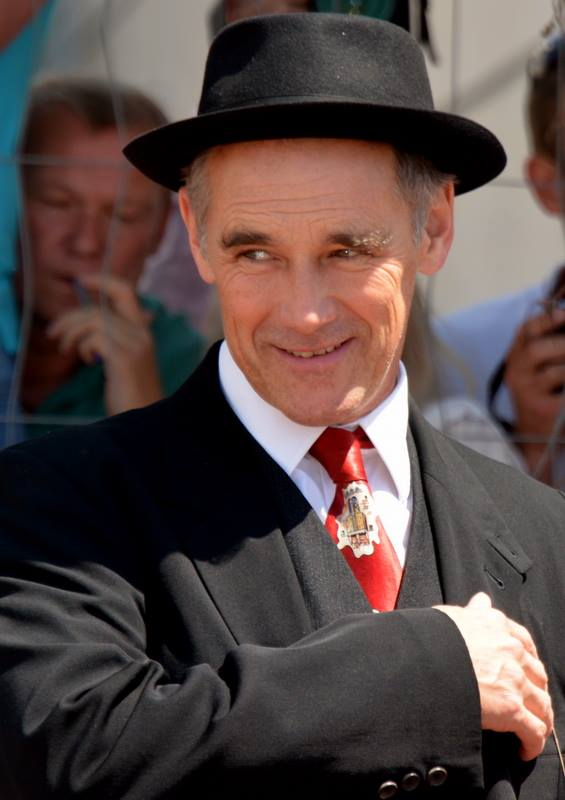
Mark Rylance

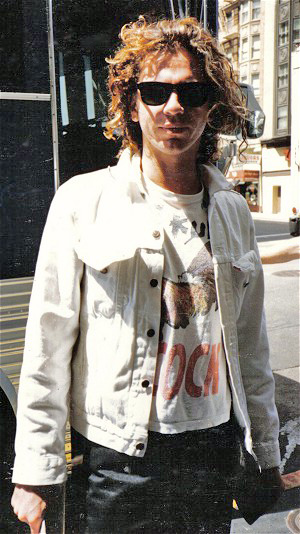
Michael Hutchence

- January 2 – Naoki Urasawa, Japanese manga author and artist
- January 4
  - Michael Stipe, American rock singer (R.E.M.)
  - April Winchell, American writer and voice actress
- January 6
  - Natalia Bestemianova, Soviet ice dancer, 1988 Olympic Champion
  - Kari Jalonen, Finnish ice hockey player
  - Nigella Lawson, English journalist, broadcaster, television personality, gourmet and food writer
- January 7 – Mohammad Javad Zarif, Iranian politician, diplomat
- January 10 – Brian Cowen, Taoiseach of Ireland
- January 12
  - Oliver Platt, Canadian actor
  - Dominique Wilkins, French-born American basketball player
- January 16
  - Wan Mohammad Khair-il Anuar, Malaysian politician, architect and entrepreneur (d. 2016)
  - Richard Elliot, Scottish-born American saxophonist
- January 18 – Mark Rylance, English actor, theatre director and playwright
- January 20
  - Sabar Koti, Indian singer (d. 2018)
  - Will Wright, American computer game designer
- January 21 – Mamoru Nagano, Japanese designer
- January 22 – Michael Hutchence, Australian rock musician (INXS) (d. 1997)
- January 23 – Patrick de Gayardon, French skydiver and skysurfing pioneer (d. 1998)
- January 27 – Samia Suluhu, President of Tanzania
- January 29
  - Gia Carangi, American model (d. 1986)
  - Sean Kerly, British field hockey player
  - Greg Louganis, American diver
  - Tigran Sargsyan, Prime Minister of Armenia
- January 31 – Grant Morrison, Scottish comic book writer and playwright

=== February ===
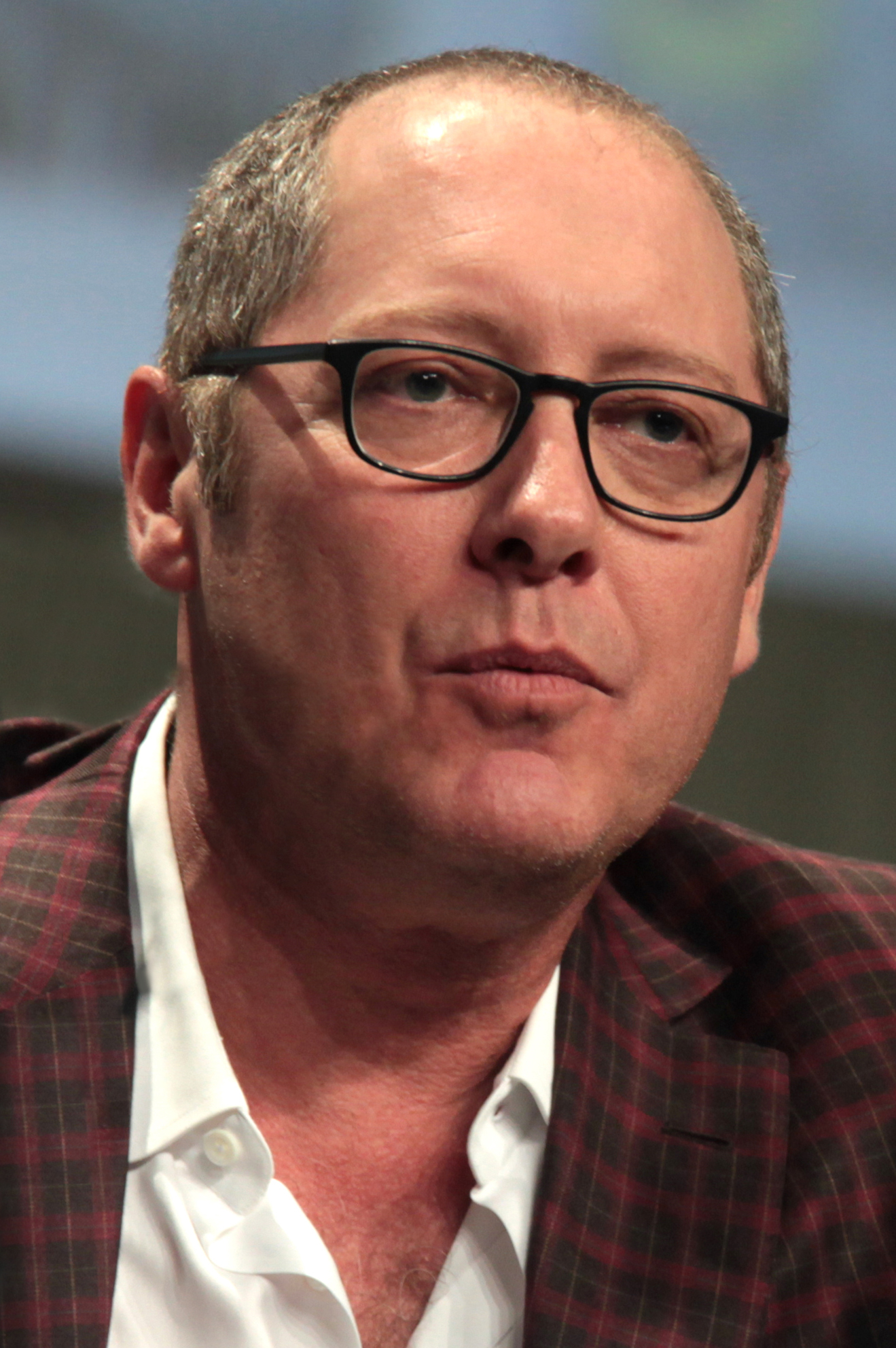
James Spader

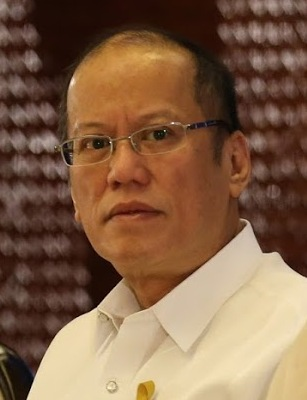
Benigno Aquino III

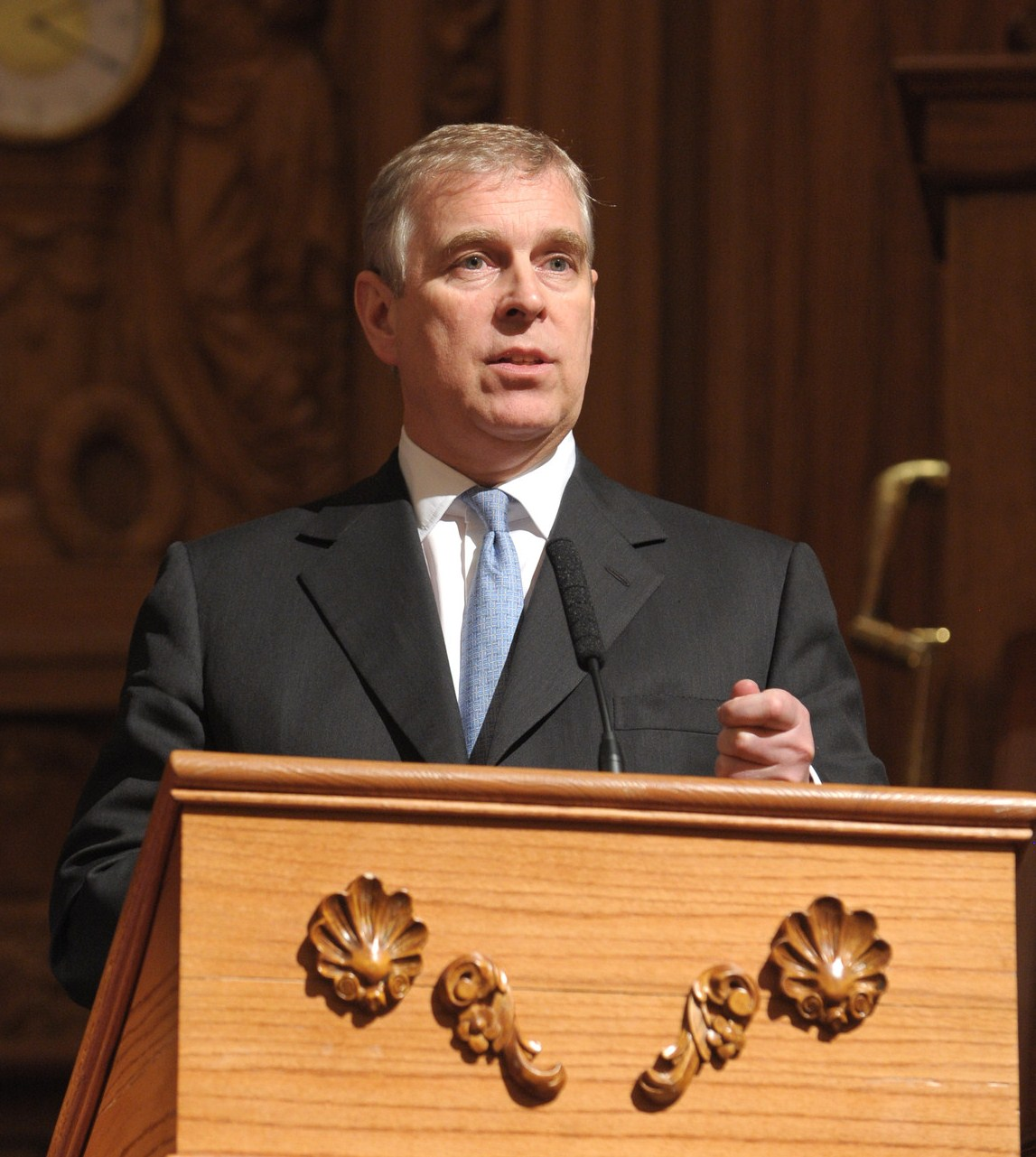
Andrew Mountbatten-Windsor

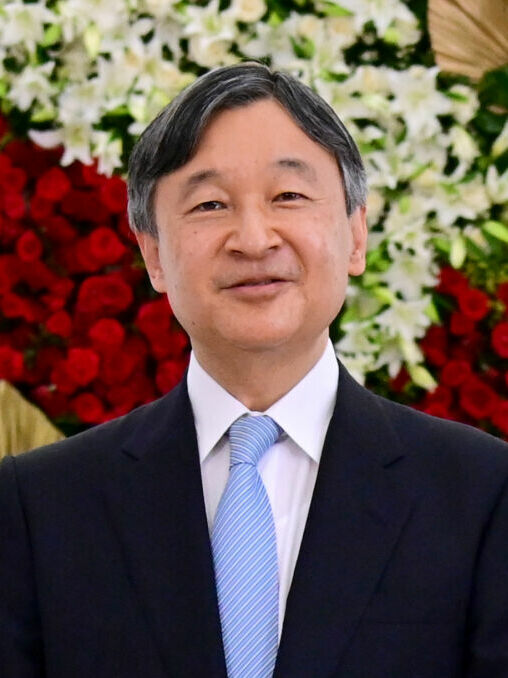
Naruhito, Emperor of Japan

- February 2 – Jari Porttila, Finnish sports journalist
- February 3
  - Marty Jannetty, American professional wrestler
  - Joachim Löw, German football manager
  - Kerry Von Erich, American professional wrestler (d. 1993)
- February 4 – Jonathan Larson, American composer and playwright (d. 1996)
- February 7
  - Yasunori Matsumoto, Japanese voice actor
  - James Spader, American actor and producer
- February 8
  - Benigno Aquino III, 15th President of the Philippines (d. 2021)
  - Alfred Gusenbauer, Chancellor of Austria
- February 9 – Frederik Ndoci, Albanian singer-songwriter, poet, writer, actor and international recording artist
- February 13 – Pierluigi Collina, Italian football (soccer) referee
- February 14
  - Olivia Cheng, Hong Kong actress
  - Meg Tilly, American-Canadian actress and novelist
- February 16 – Tineke Huizinga, Dutch politician
- February 18
  - Gazebo, Italian musician
  - Tony Anselmo, American animator and voice actor
- February 19 – Andrew Mountbatten-Windsor, British former prince and second son of Queen Elizabeth II and the Duke of Edinburgh
- February 20
  - Kee Marcello, Swedish rock guitarist (Easy Action, Europe)
  - Cándido Muatetema Rivas, 4th Prime Minister of Equatorial Guinea (d. 2014)
  - Fayez al-Sarraj, President of Libya
- February 21
  - Laurent Petitguillaume, French radio and television host
  - Ricky Tosso, Peruvian actor (d. 2016)
- February 23 – Naruhito, Emperor of Japan
- February 24 – Wendy Sharpe, Australian artist
- February 27
  - Andrés Gómez, Ecuadorian tennis player
  - Paul Humphreys, English musician (OMD)
- February 28
  - Tōru Ōkawa, Japanese voice actor
  - Dorothy Stratten, Canadian model and actress (d. 1980)
- February 29 – Richard Ramirez, American serial killer (d. 2013)

=== March ===
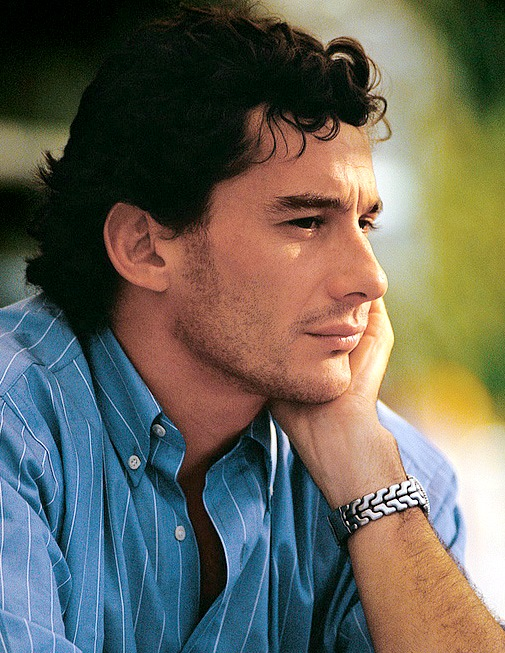
Ayrton Senna

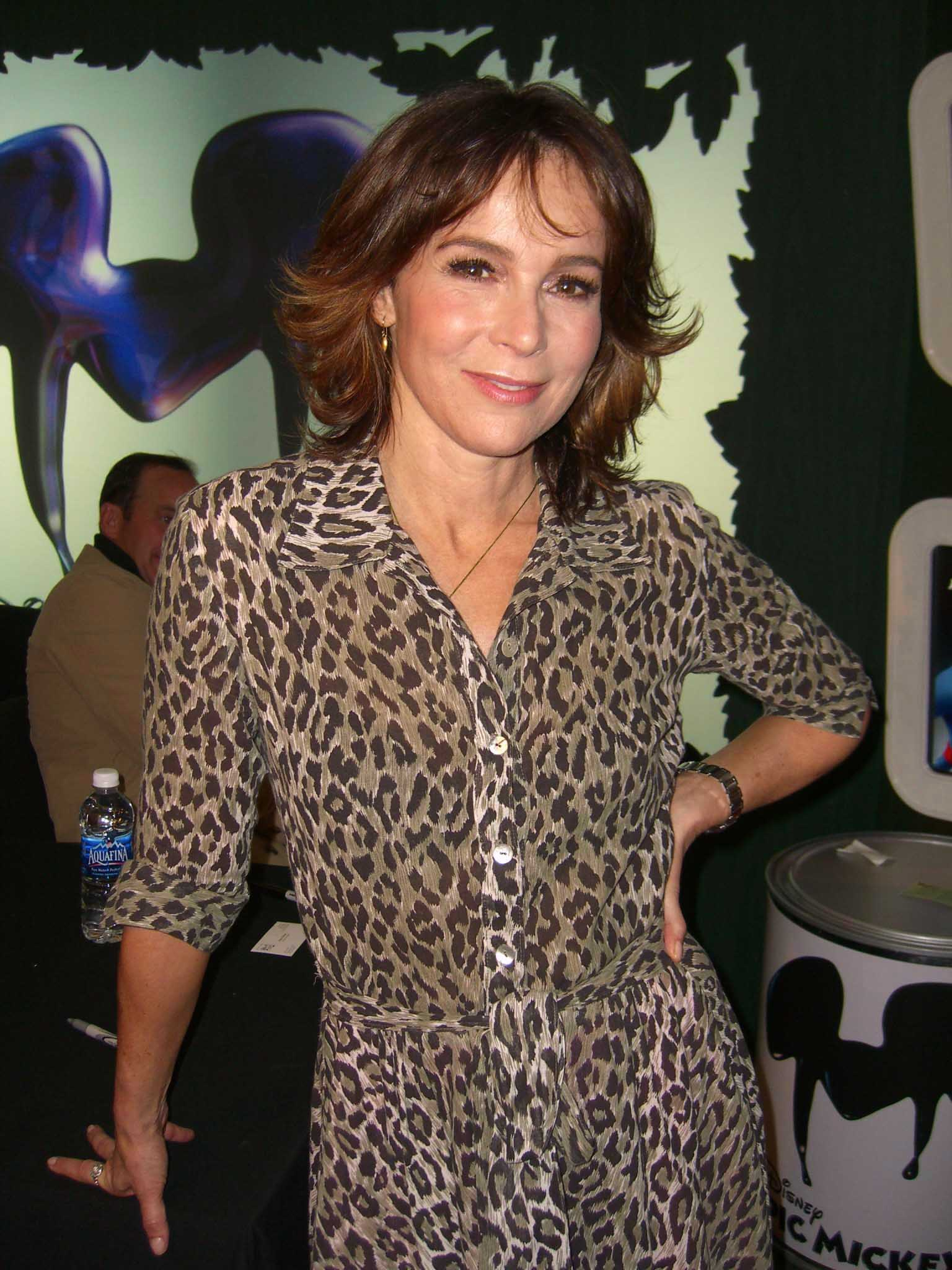
Jennifer Grey

- March 2 – Hector Calma, Filipino basketball player
- March 4
  - Mikko Kuustonen, Finnish singer-songwriter
  - John Mugabi, Ugandan boxer and World Junior Middleweight champion
- March 7 – Ivan Lendl, Czech tennis player
- March 8
  - Finn Carter, American actress
  - Jeffrey Eugenides, American author
- March 10
  - Anne MacKenzie, Scottish broadcaster
  - Anthony Fisher, Australian prelate of the Catholic Church and a friar of the Order of Preachers
- March 11 – Sharon Jordan, American actress
- March 12 – Minoru Niihara, Japanese singer (Loudness)
- March 13
  - Joe Ranft, American screenwriter, animator, storyboard artist and voice actor (d. 2005)
  - Adam Clayton, English-born Irish musician (U2)
- March 15 – Rosa Beltrán, Mexican writer, lecturer and academic
- March 17 – Arye Gross, American actor
- March 20 – Norbert Pohlmann, German computer scientist
- March 21
  - Ayrton Senna, Brazilian triple Formula One world champion (d. 1994)
  - Robert Sweet, American rock drummer (Stryper)
- March 23
  - Nicol Stephen, Scottish politician
  - Yoko Tawada, Japanese writer
- March 24
  - Jan Berglin, Swedish cartoonist
  - Kelly Le Brock, American-English model and actress
  - Nena, German singer
- March 25
  - Brenda Strong, American actress
  - Haywood Nelson, American actor
- March 26 – Jennifer Grey, American actress
- March 27
  - Hans Pflügler, German footballer
  - Renato Russo, Brazilian singer (Legião Urbana) (d. 1996)
- March 29 – Hiromi Tsuru, Japanese voice actress (d. 2017)

=== April ===
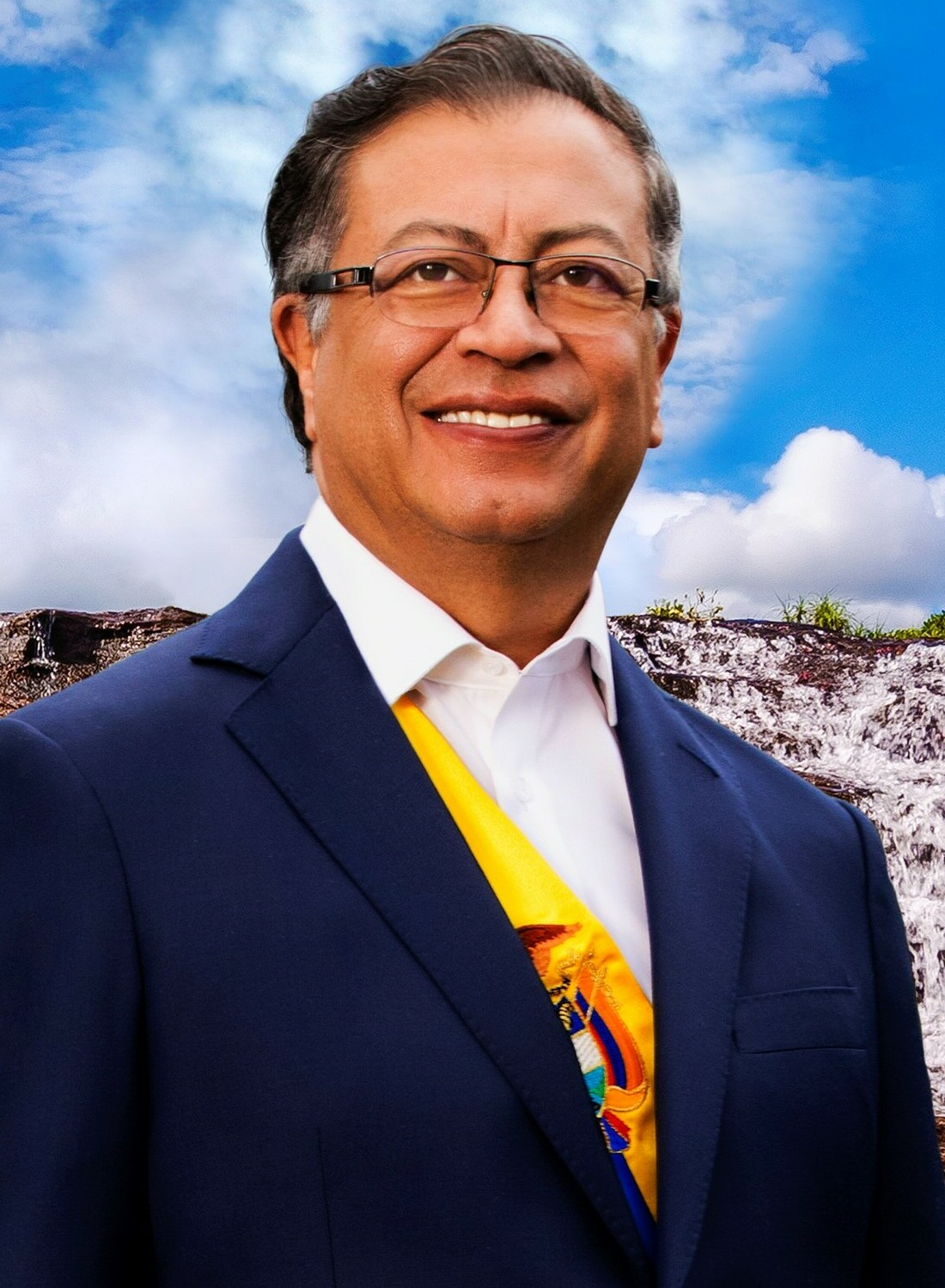
Gustavo Petro

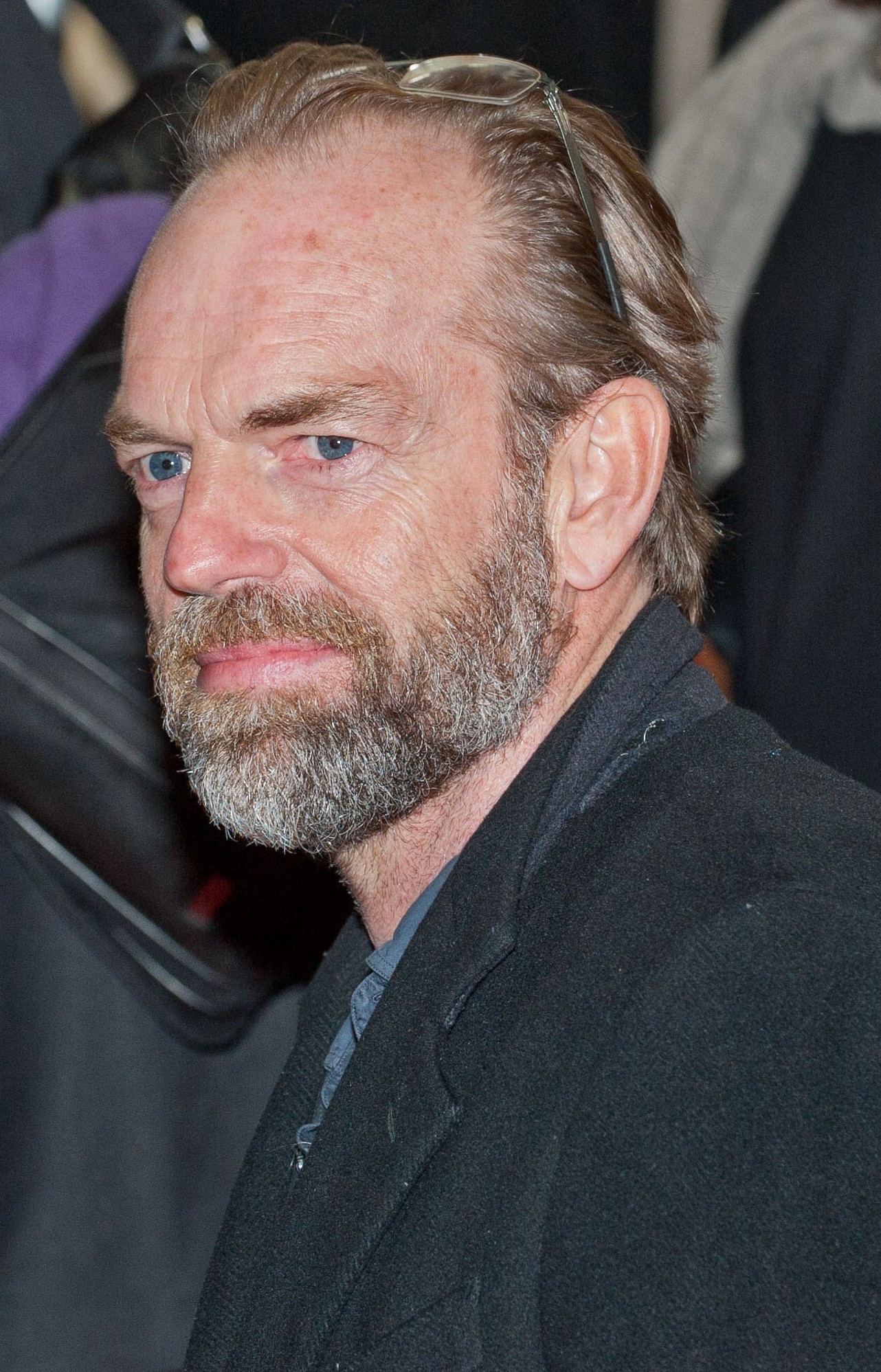
Hugo Weaving

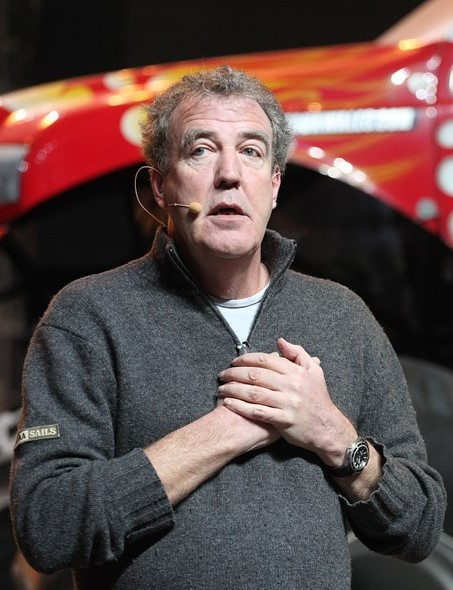
Jeremy Clarkson

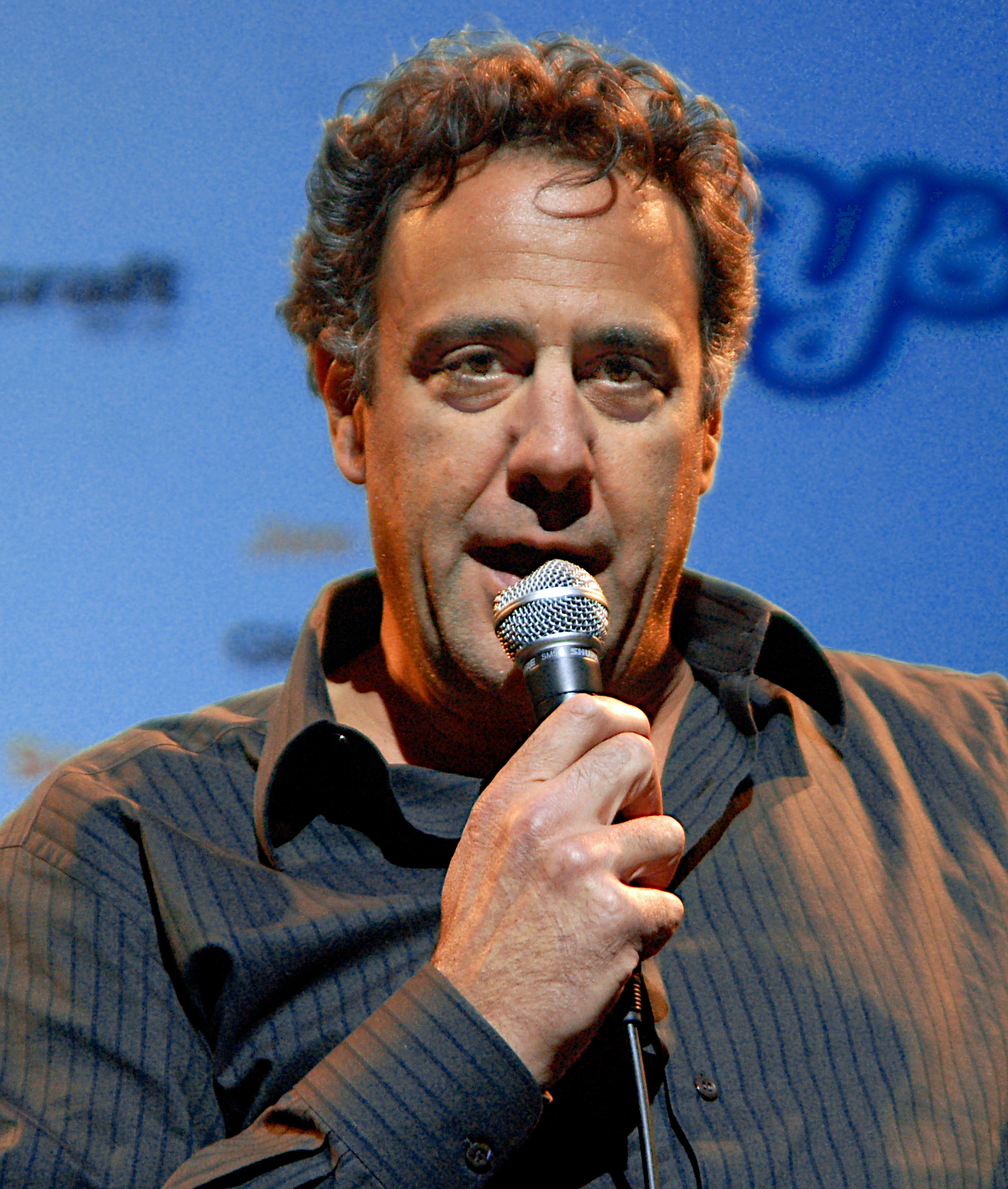
Brad Garrett

Susanne Bier

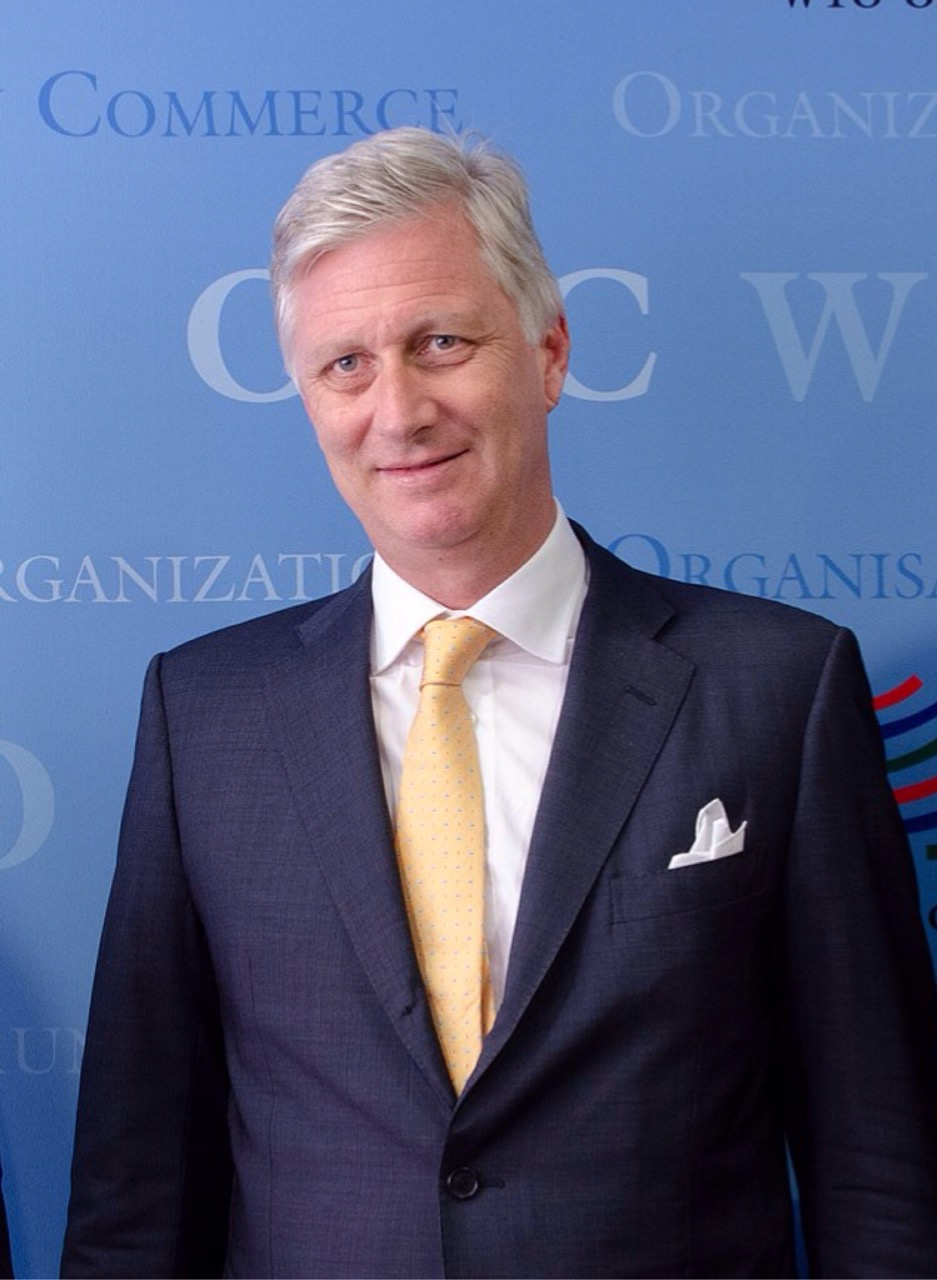
Philippe of Belgium

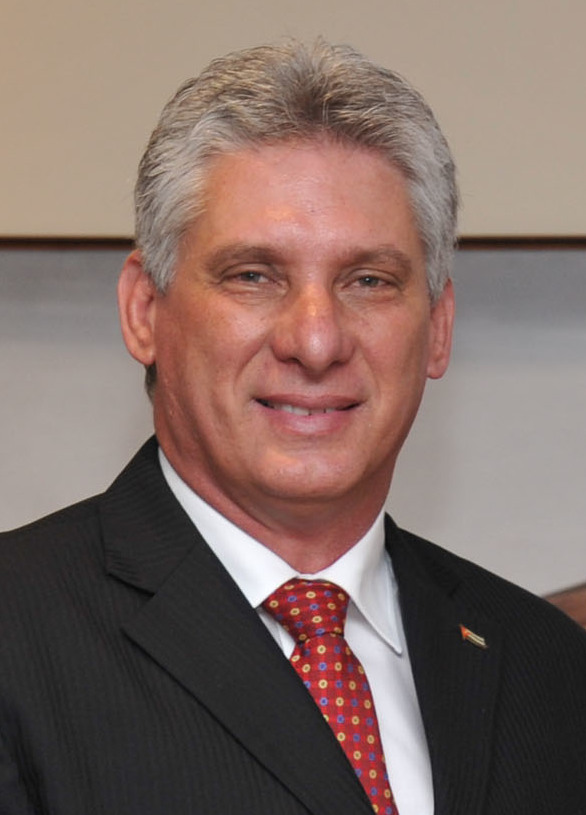
Miguel Díaz-Canel

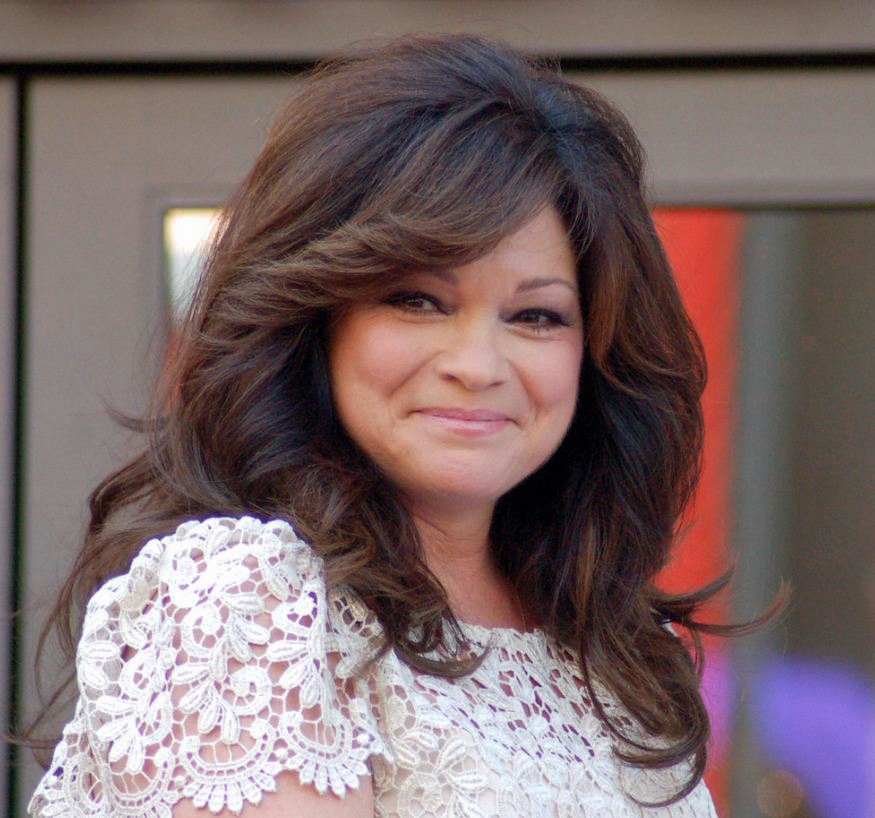
Valerie Bertinelli

- April 1 – Michael Praed, British actor
- April 2 – Linford Christie, British athlete
- April 4 – Hugo Weaving, Nigerian-born Australian actor
- April 8 – John Schneider, American actor
- April 9 – Isabel Coixet, Spanish film director
- April 10
  - Fabio Golfetti, Brazilian musician and record producer (Violeta de Outono, Gong)
  - Héctor Rivoira, Argentine football manager and player (d. 2019)
- April 11 – Jeremy Clarkson, English journalist, television show host and comedian
- April 12 – David Thirdkill, American basketball player
- April 13
  - Dinesh Kaushik, Indian politician
  - Rudi Völler, German footballer and manager
- April 14
  - Brad Garrett, American actor, comedian and voice actor
  - Osamu Sato, Japanese digital artist, video game developer, photographer, and composer
- April 15
  - Susanne Bier, Danish film director
  - King Philippe of Belgium
- April 16
  - Rafael Benítez, Spanish football manager
  - Pierre Littbarski, German footballer and coach
  - Sok Siphana, Cambodian lawyer
- April 18
  - Neo Rauch, German painter
  - J. Christopher Stevens, American diplomat, U.S. Ambassador to Libya (d. 2012)
- April 19 – Gustavo Petro, President of Colombia, 2022–2026
- April 20 – Miguel Díaz-Canel, Cuban politician, First Secretary of the Communist Party of Cuba and 17th President of Cuba
- April 23
  - Valerie Bertinelli, American actress and presenter
  - Steve Clark, English guitarist (Def Leppard) (d. 1991)
  - Craig Sheffer, American actor
- April 28
  - Elena Kagan, Associate Justice of the Supreme Court of the United States
  - Ian Rankin, Scottish crime novelist
- April 29 – Steve Blum, American voice actor

=== May ===
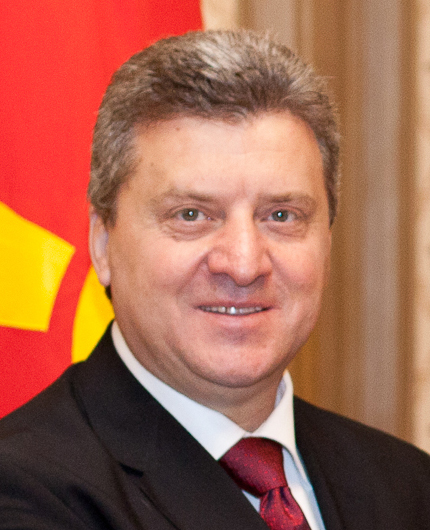
Gjorge Ivanov

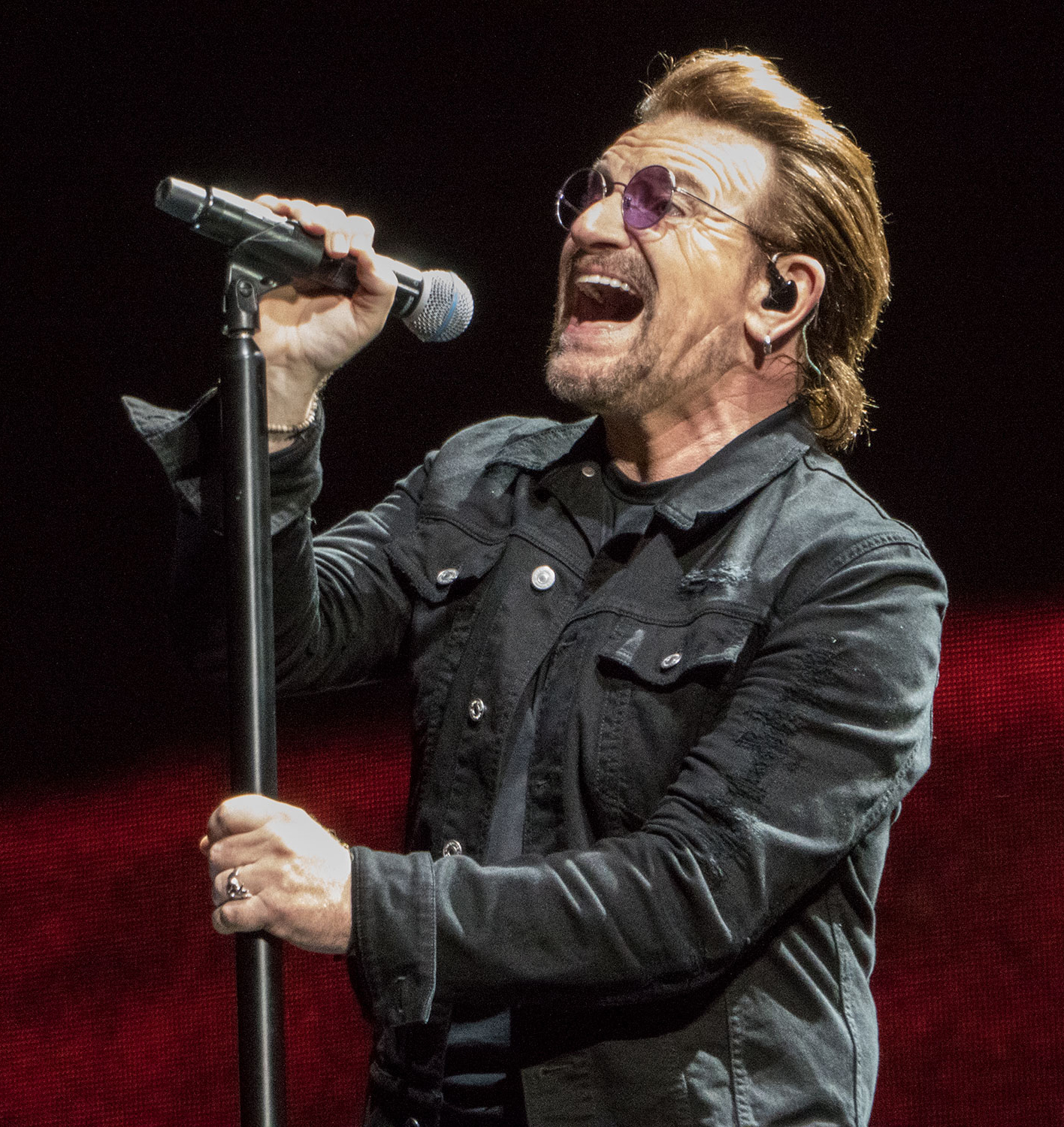
Bono

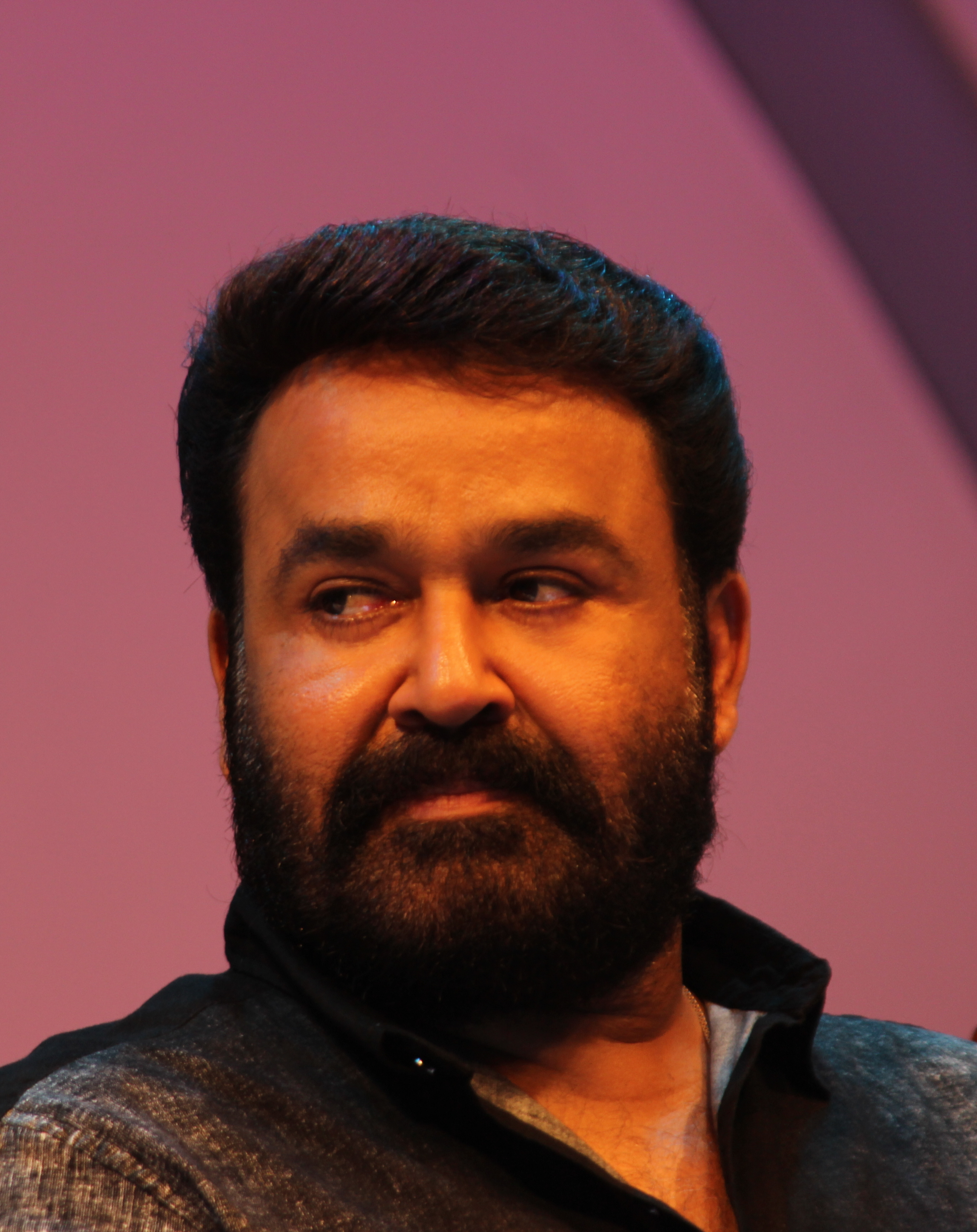
Mohanlal

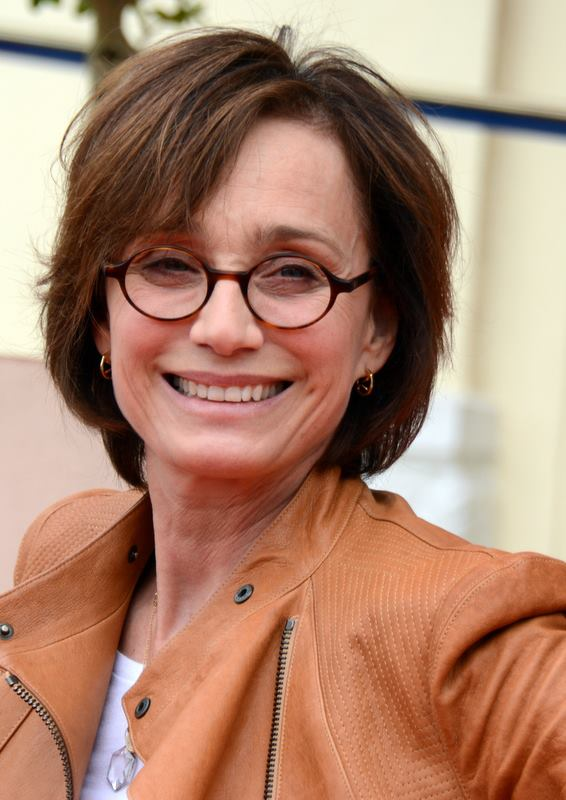
Kristin Scott Thomas

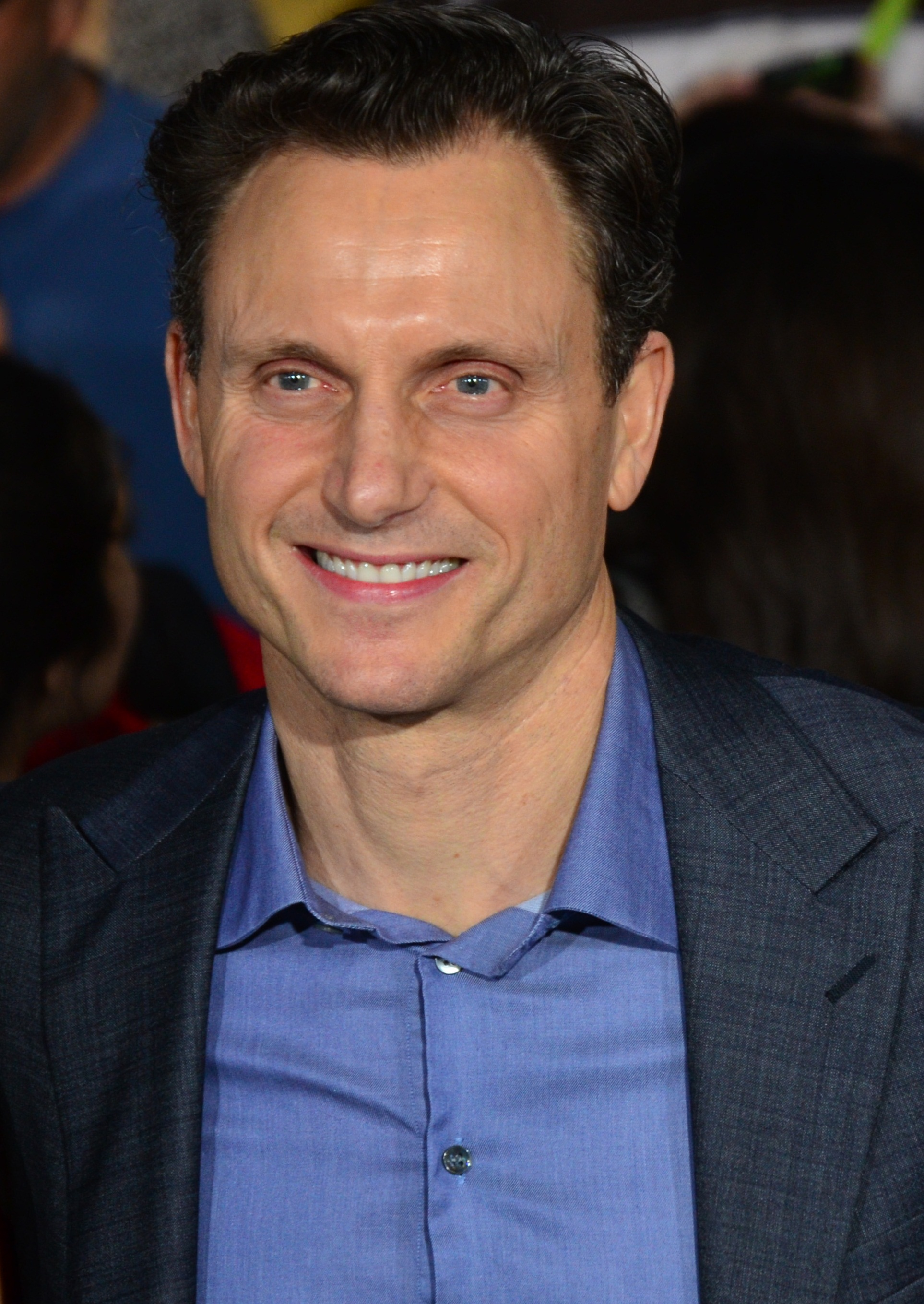
Tony Goldwyn

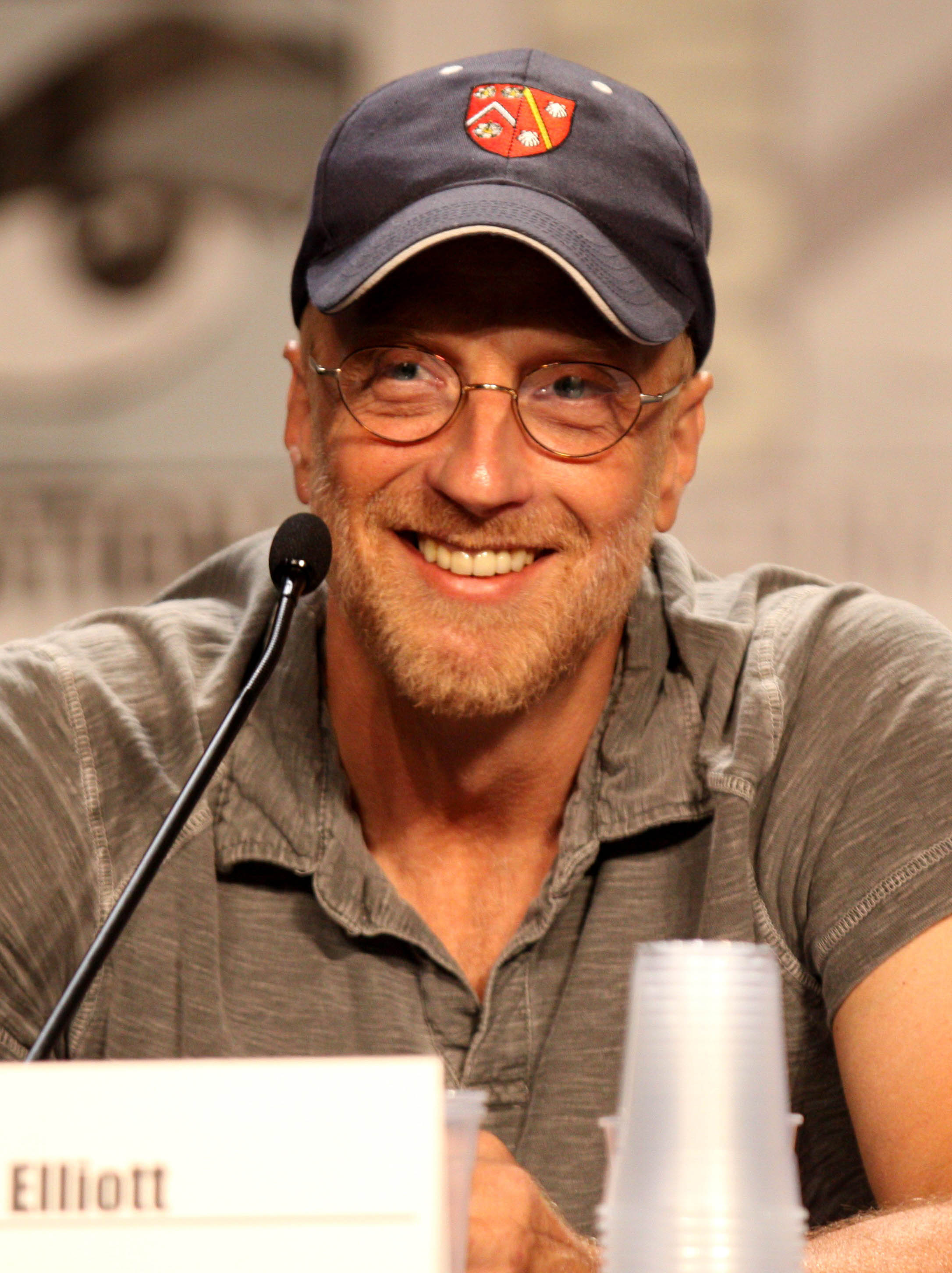
Chris Elliott

- May 2
  - Stephen Daldry, English film director
  - Gjorge Ivanov, President of Macedonia
- May 4 – Werner Faymann, Chancellor of Austria
- May 8
  - Franco Baresi, Italian footballer (d. 2026)
  - Sergey Belyayev, Kazakhstani shooter (d. 2020)
- May 10
  - Bono, Irish rock singer (U2)
  - Merlene Ottey, Jamaican-Slovenian track and field sprinter
- May 16
  - Landon Deireragea, Nauruan politician
  - Lovebug Starski, American rapper and disc jockey (d. 2018)
- May 18
  - Jari Kurri, Finnish hockey player
  - Yannick Noah, French tennis player
- May 19 – Yazz, British pop singer
- May 20
  - John Billingsley, American actor
  - Tony Goldwyn, American actor, voice actor and film director
- May 21
  - Jeffrey Dahmer, American serial killer (d. 1994)
  - Mark Ridgway, Australian cricketer
  - Vladimir Salnikov, Russian swimmer
- May 21 – Mohanlal, Indian actor
- May 22
  - Amir Ishemgulov, Russian biologist and politician (d. 2020)
  - Hideaki Anno, Japanese director
- May 23 – Linden Ashby, American actor
- May 24
  - Greg Conescu, Australian rugby league player
  - Guy Fletcher, British keyboardist (Dire Straits)
  - Doug Jones, American actor
  - Kristin Scott Thomas, English actress
- May 25 – Amy Klobuchar, American politician
- May 27
  - Alexander Bashlachev, Soviet poet and rock musician (d. 1988)
  - D. Kupendra Reddy, Indian politician
- May 29 – Thomas Baumer, Swiss economist, interculturalist and personality assessor
- May 31 – Chris Elliott, American actor and comedian

=== June ===
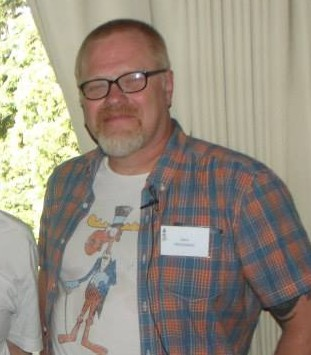
Gary Trousdale

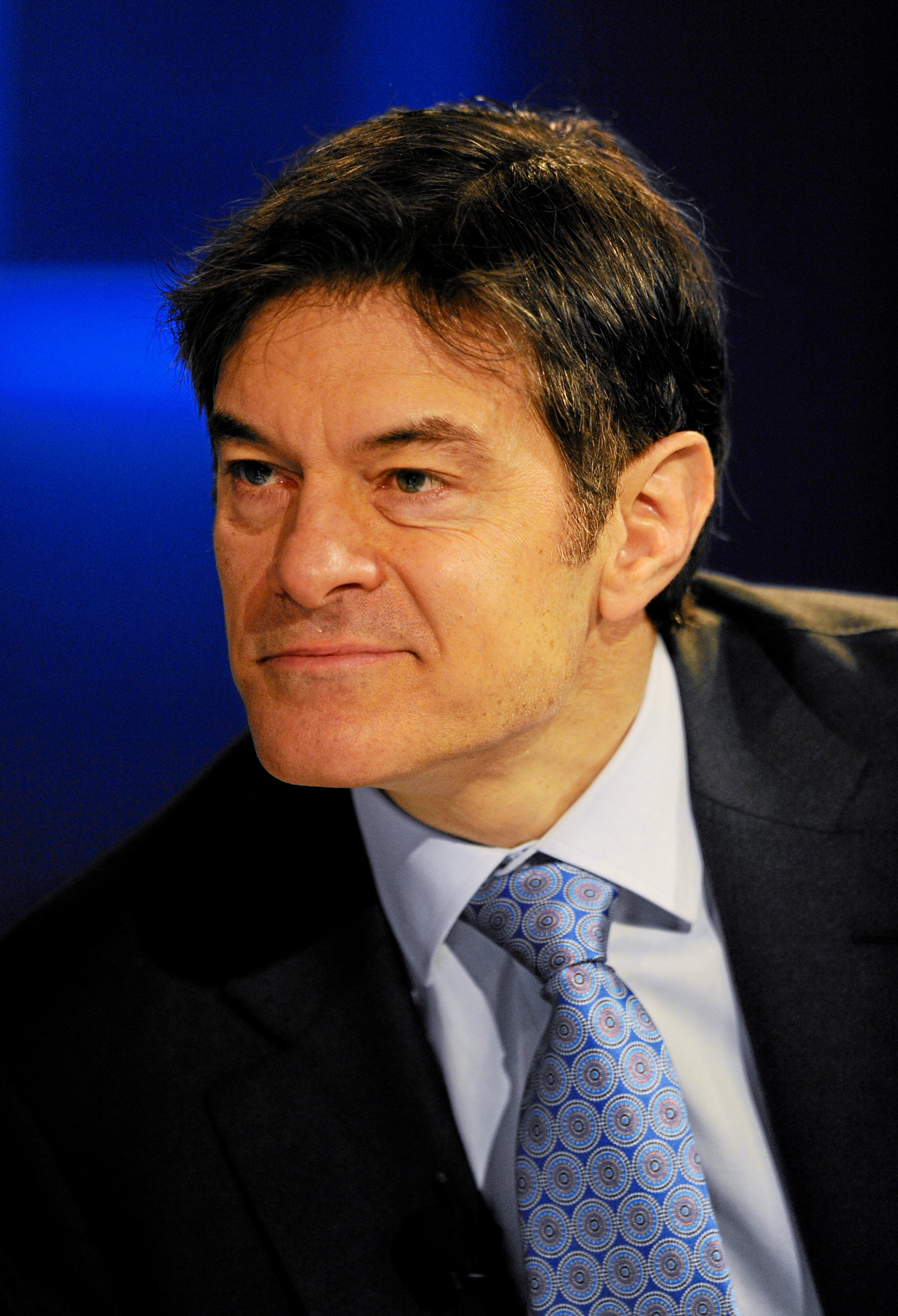
Dr. Mehmet Oz

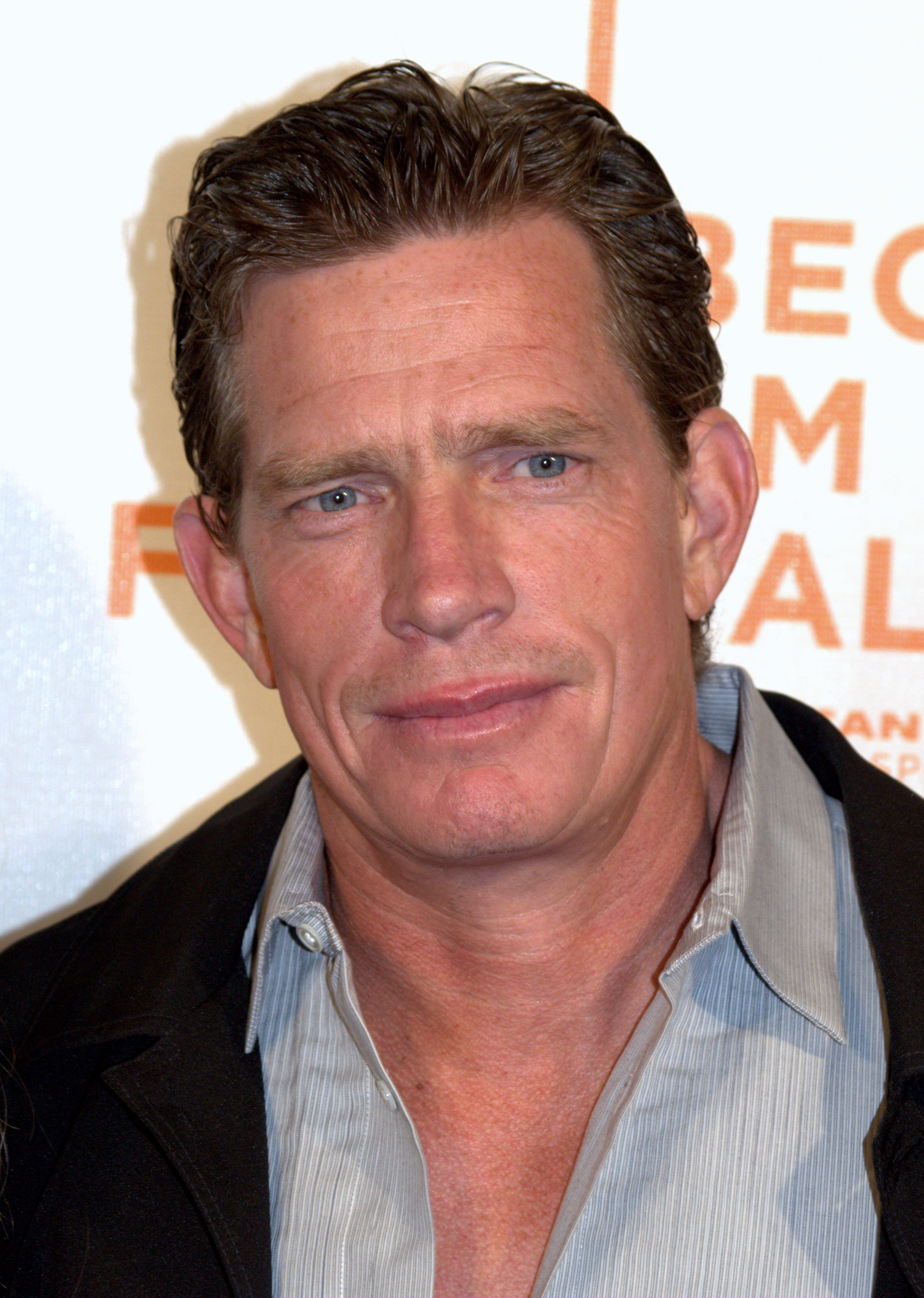
Thomas Haden Church

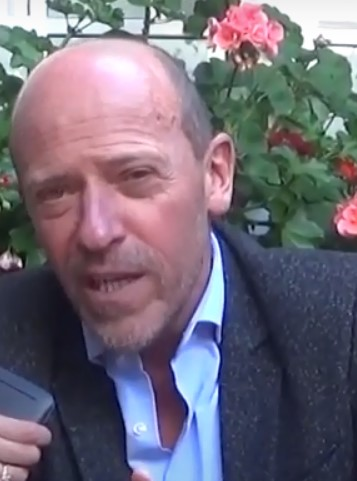
Diego Trujillo

- June 2
  - P. Balasubramaniam, Malaysian police officer (d. 2013)
  - Tony Hadley, British pop musician, lead singer of Spandau Ballet
  - Kyle Petty, American NASCAR driver and sports commentator
  - Maria Lourdes Sereno, Filipina jurist, 24th Chief Justice of the Supreme Court of the Philippines
- June 3 – Catherine Davani, first female Papua New Guinean judge (d. 2016)
- June 4 - Paul Taylor, American keyboardist (Winger)
- June 5 – Seiichi Endo, Japanese criminal (d. 2018)
- June 6
  - Steve Vai, American guitarist
  - Raudin Anwar, Indonesian diplomat
- June 7 − Hirohiko Araki, Japanese manga writer
- June 8
  - Gary Trousdale, American animator and film director
  - Mick Hucknall, English rock singer-songwriter (Simply Red)
- June 11 – Mehmet Oz, Turkish-American cardiothoracic surgeon and television personality
- June 12 – Corynne Charby, French model, actress and singer
- June 15 – Michèle Laroque, French actress
- June 17
  - Thomas Haden Church, American actor and film director
  - Adrián Campos, Spanish Formula One driver (d. 2021)
- June 18 – Coco Fusco, Cuban-American artist, writer and curator
- June 20
  - Gamini Amarasekera, Sri Lankan puisne justice of the Supreme Court
  - Anatoly Donika, Russian ice hockey player
- June 21 – Karl Erjavec, Slovenian lawyer and politician
- June 22 – Erin Brockovich, American environmental activist
- June 23 – Per Morberg, Swedish actor, chef and news presenter
- June 26 – Mauro Carlesse, Brazilian politician, Governor of Tocantins
- June 27 – Michael Mayer, American theatre director, film director, television director and playwright
- June 28 – John Elway, American football player
- June 29 – Ivans Ribakovs, Latvian politician
- June 30
  - Anna Šišková, Slovak actress
  - Tony Bellotto, Brazilian guitarist and writer
  - Diego Trujillo, Colombian actor
  - Vincent Klyn, New Zealand-born actor and surfer
  - Murray Cook, musician

=== July ===
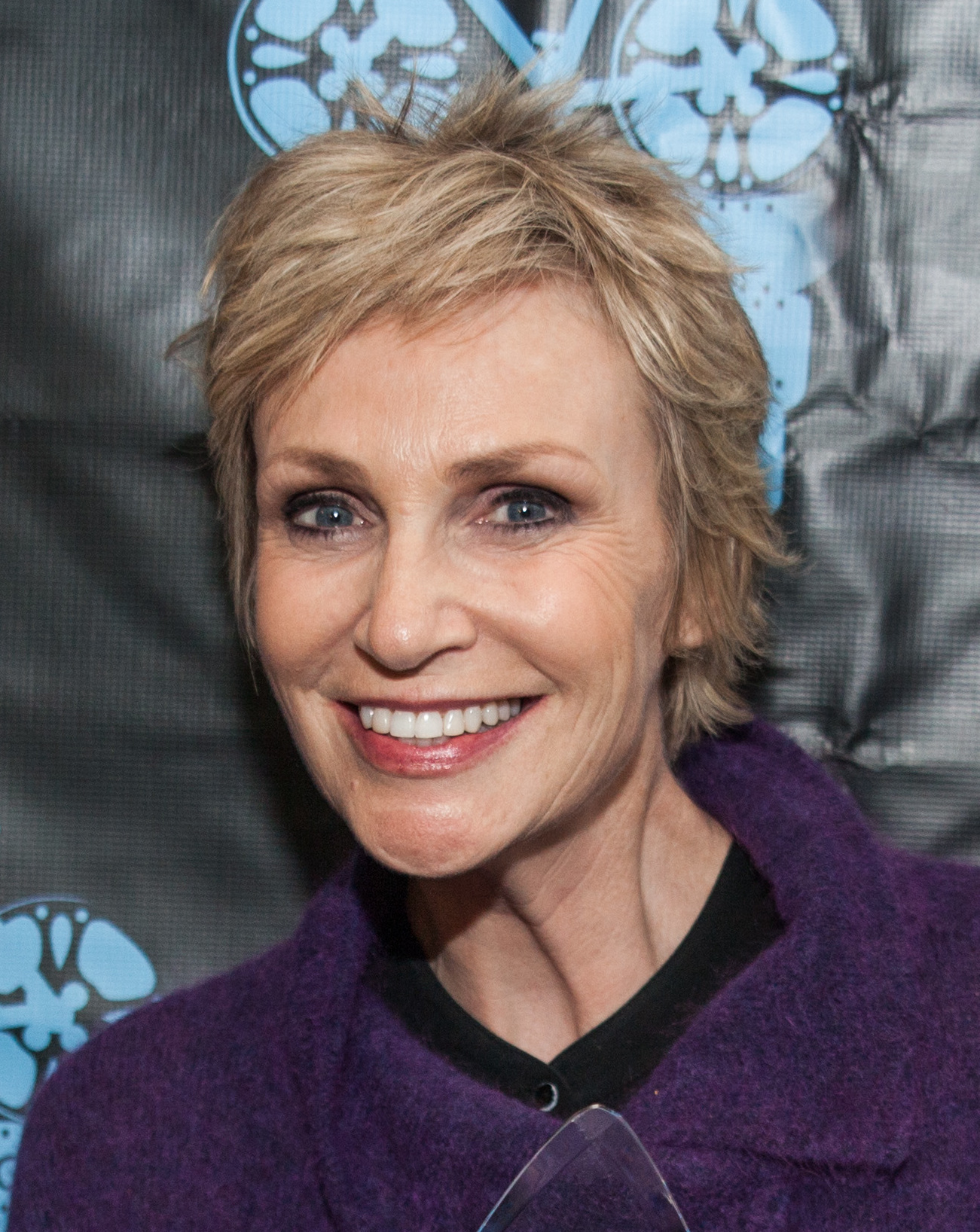
Jane Lynch

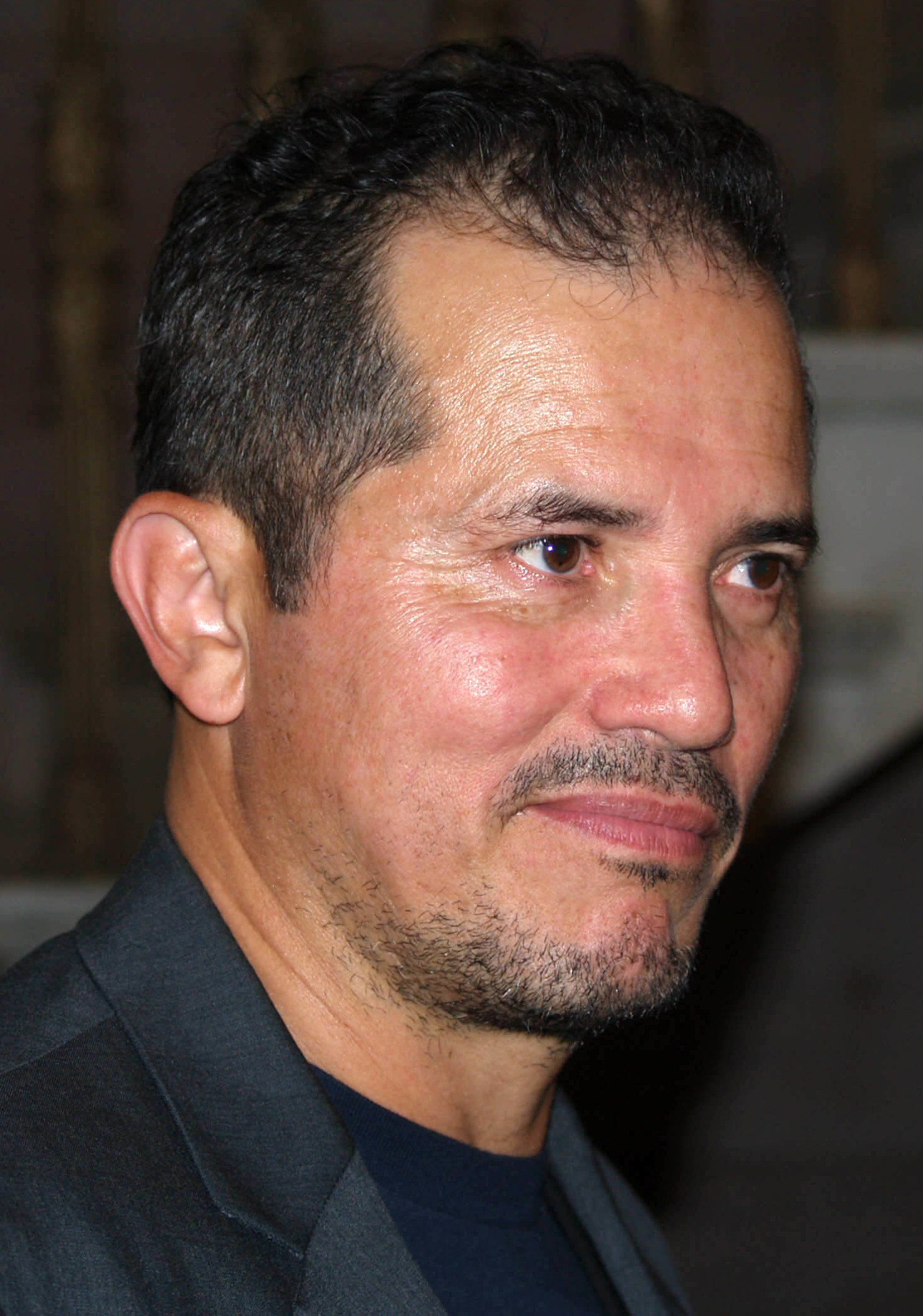
John Leguizamo

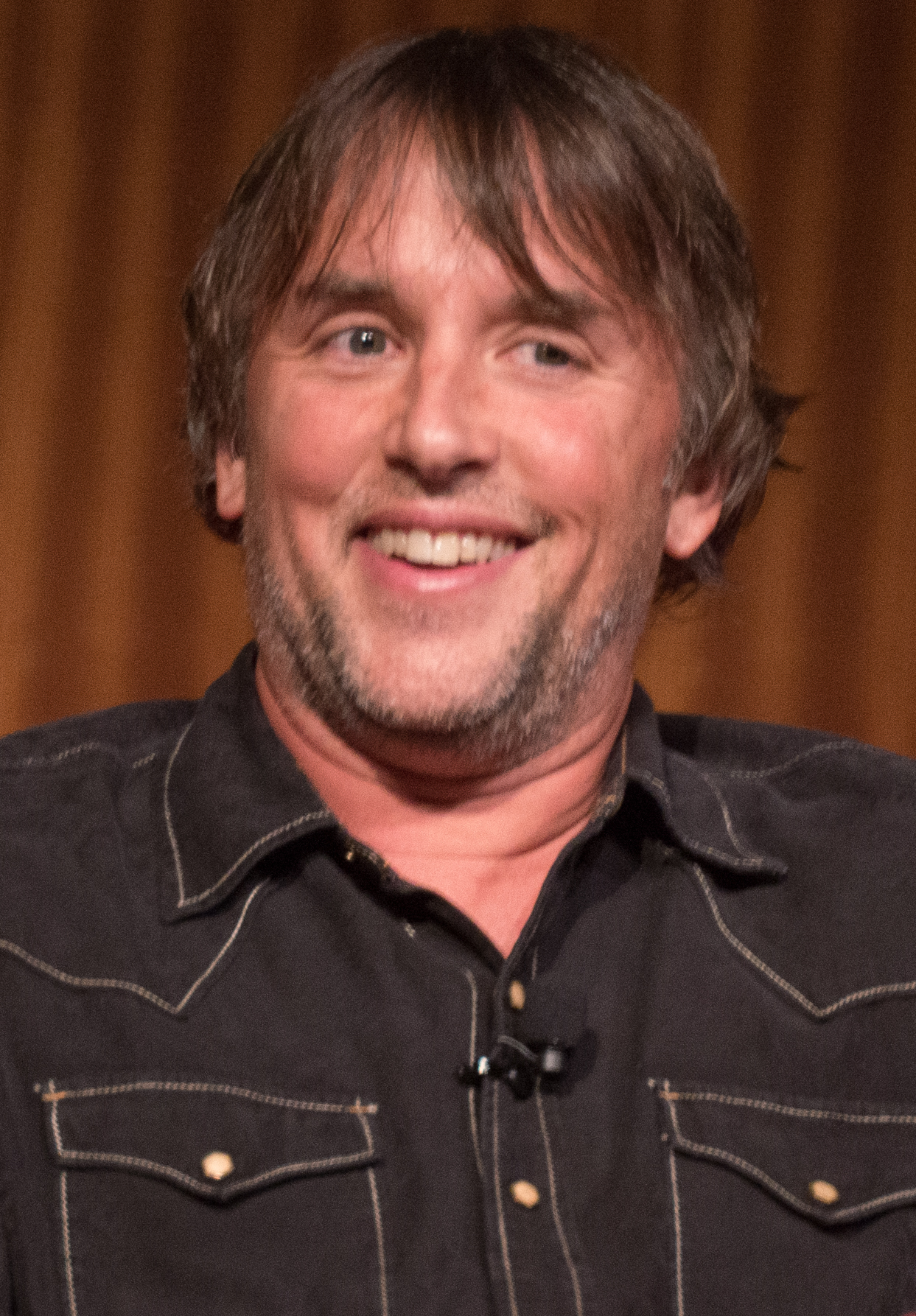
Richard Linklater

- July 1
  - Kōji Ishii, Japanese voice actor
  - Mikael Håfström, Swedish film director and screenwriter
  - Evelyn "Champagne" King, American disco singer
- July 3
  - Vince Clarke, British musician and composer (Depeche Mode, Erasure)
  - Perrine Pelen, French alpine skier
  - Håkan Loob, Swedish ice hockey player
- July 4 – Roland Ratzenberger, Austrian Formula One driver (d. 1994)
- July 5 – Hugo Rubio, Chilean football player
- July 6
  - Lyudmyla Denisova, Ukrainian politician
  - Ferenc Juhász, Minister of Defence for Hungary
  - Md. Abdul Karim (Gaibandha politician) (born 1960), Bangladeshi politician
- July 7 – Kevin A. Ford, American astronaut
- July 8
  - Thilo Martinho, German composer and singer-songwriter
  - Eleanor Scott, British archaeologist and politician
  - Mal Meninga, Australian rugby league player and coach
- July 9
  - Wanda Vázquez Garced, Puerto Rican politician, Governor
  - Michael Feichtenbeiner, German football coach
- July 10
  - Jeff Bergman, American voice actor, comedian and impressionist
  - Ariel Castro, Puerto Rican-American convicted kidnapper and rapist, previously bus driver (d. 2013)
- July 11 – Jafar Panahi, Iranian filmmaker
- July 13
  - Ian Hislop, British journalist and broadcaster
  - Frane Perišin, Croatian actor
- July 14
  - Kyle Gass, American music singer-songwriter-guitarist/actor
  - Jane Lynch, American actress, comedian and author
  - Angélique Kidjo, Beninese singer-songwriter and activist
- July 16
  - Jacqueline Gold, British businesswoman (d. 2023)
  - PJ Powers, South African musician
- July 17
  - Robin Shou, Hong Kong martial artist and actor
  - Mark Burnett, British television and film producer
  - Jan Wouters, Dutch football player and manager
- July 18 - Anne-Marie Johnson, American actress
- July 19 – Atom Egoyan, Armenian-Canadian film maker
- July 21
  - Ezequiel Viñao, Argentine-born composer
  - Fritz Walter, German footballer
- July 22 − John Leguizamo, Colombian-American actor, comedian and producer
- July 27
  - Murdu Fernando, 48th Chief Justice of Sri Lanka
  - Uddhav Thackeray, Indian politician
- July 28 − Harald Lesch, German physicist, astronomer, natural philosopher, author, television presenter, professor of physics
- July 29 – Wendy Law, British crossword compiler and librarian (d. 2026)
- July 30 – Richard Linklater, American director
- July 31 – Dale Hunter, Canadian ice hockey player and coach

=== August ===
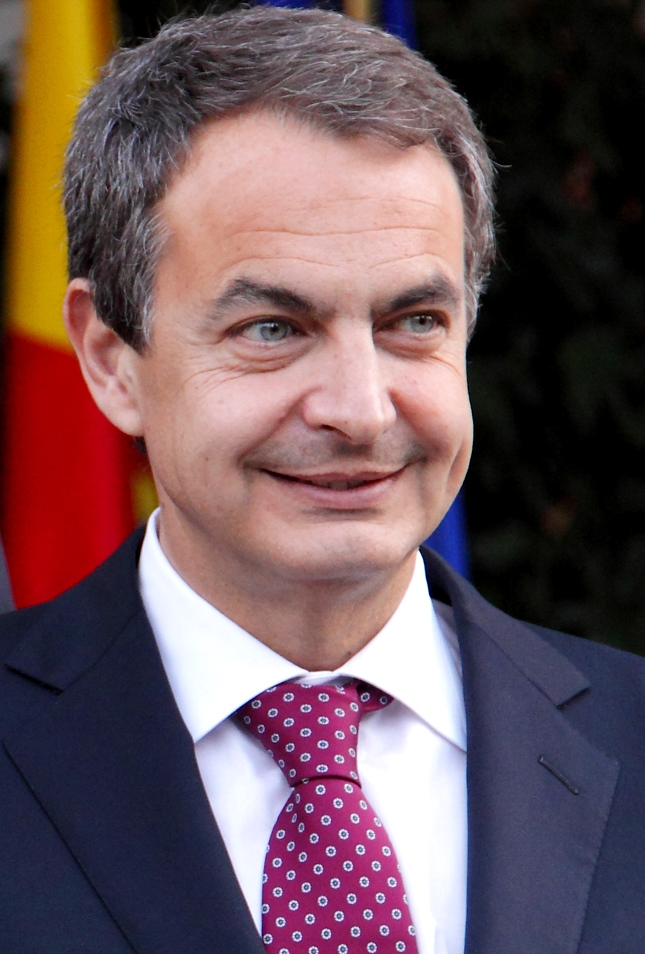
José Luis Rodríguez Zapatero

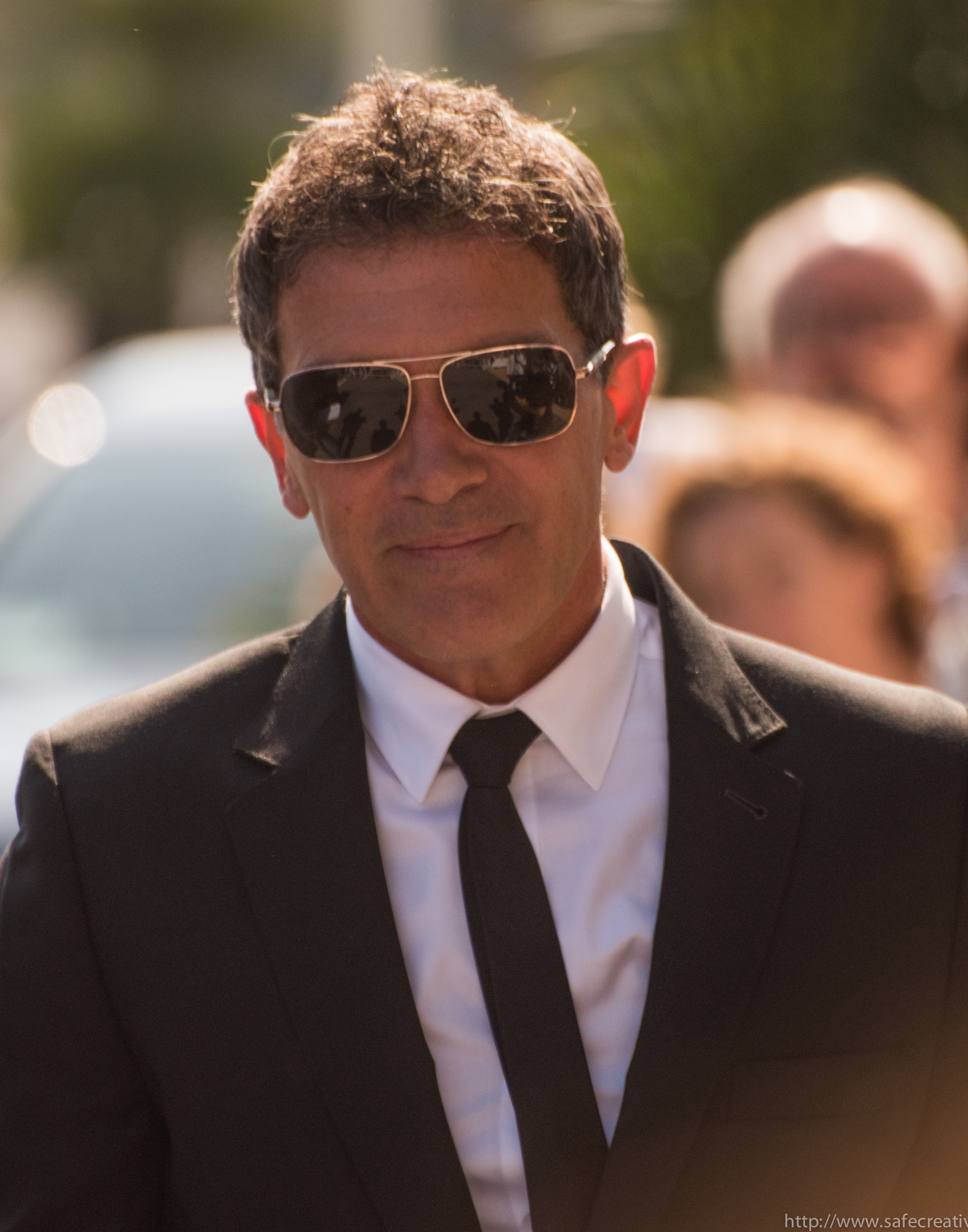
Antonio Banderas

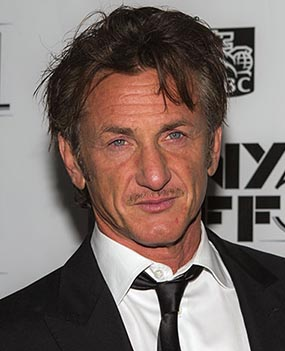
Sean Penn

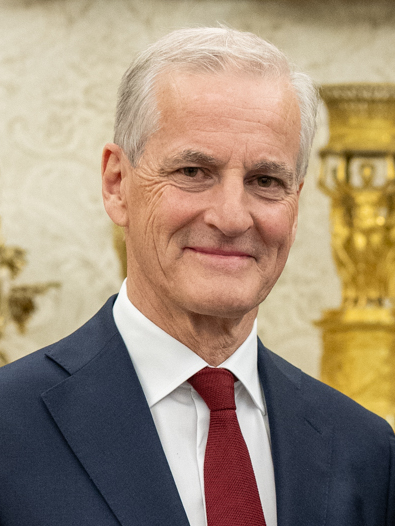
Jonas Gahr Støre

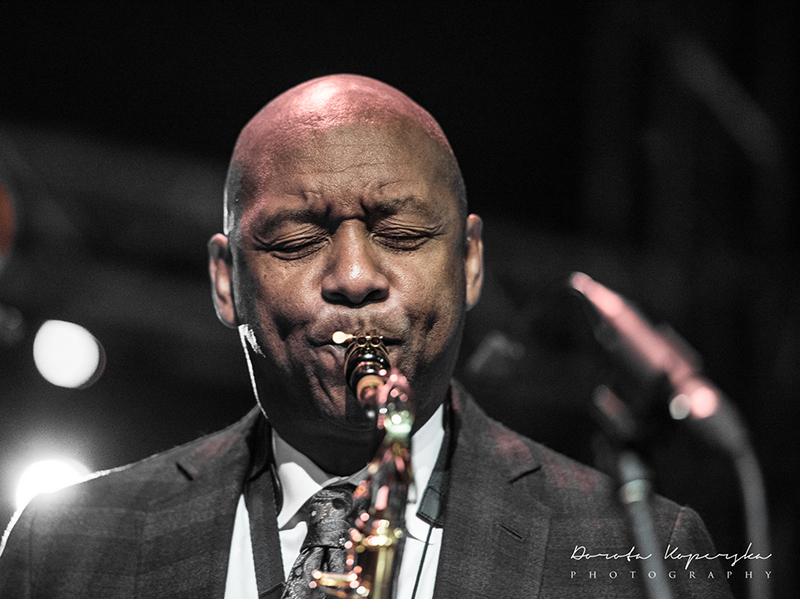
Branford Marsalis

- August 1 − Chuck D, American rapper (Public Enemy)
- August 4
  - Dean Malenko, American professional wrestler
  - José Luis Rodríguez Zapatero, Prime Minister of Spain
- August 7
  - Rosana Pastor, Spanish actress
  - David Duchovny, American actor
- August 10 − Antonio Banderas, Spanish actor and film director
- August 12 – Laurent Fignon, French road bicycle racer (d. 2010)
- August 13
  - Koji Kondo, Japanese composer
  - Phil Taylor, English darts player
  - Lorna Simpson, American photographer and multimedia artist
- August 14 – Sarah Brightman, English soprano singer and actress
- August 16
  - Franz Welser-Möst, Austrian conductor
  - Timothy Hutton, American actor
- August 17 – Sean Penn, American actor and film director
- August 20 – Elizabeth Alda, American actress
- August 22 – Regina Taylor, American actress
- August 23 – Chris Potter, Canadian actor and musician
- August 24 – Cal Ripken Jr., American baseball player
- August 25 – Jonas Gahr Støre, Norwegian politician, Prime Minister of Norway (2021–present)
- August 26
  - Branford Marsalis, American musician
  - Ola Ray, American actress and model
- August 28 – Leroy Chiao, American engineer, retired NASA astronaut
- August 29 – Viire Valdma, Estonian actress

=== September ===
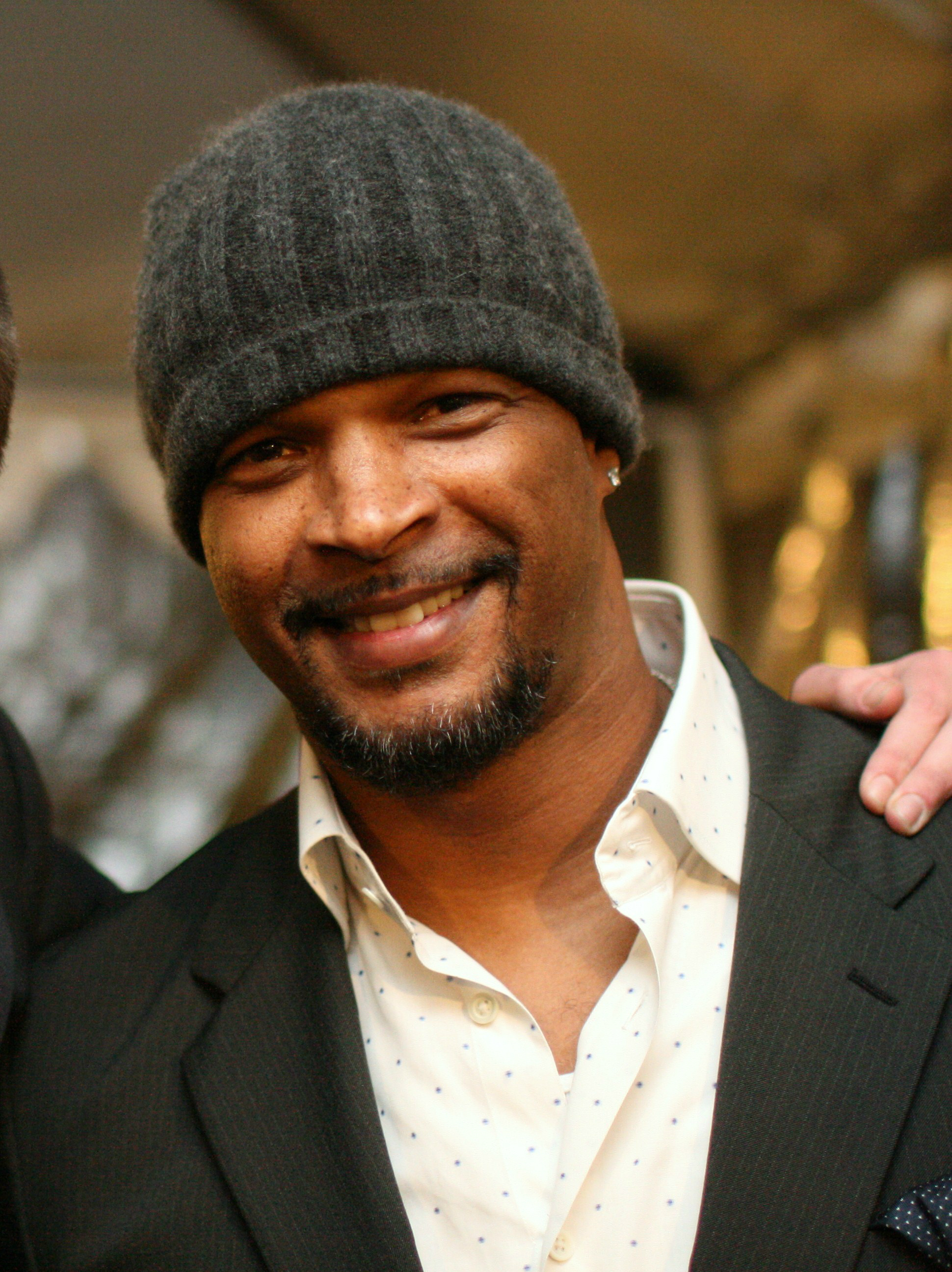
Damon Wayans

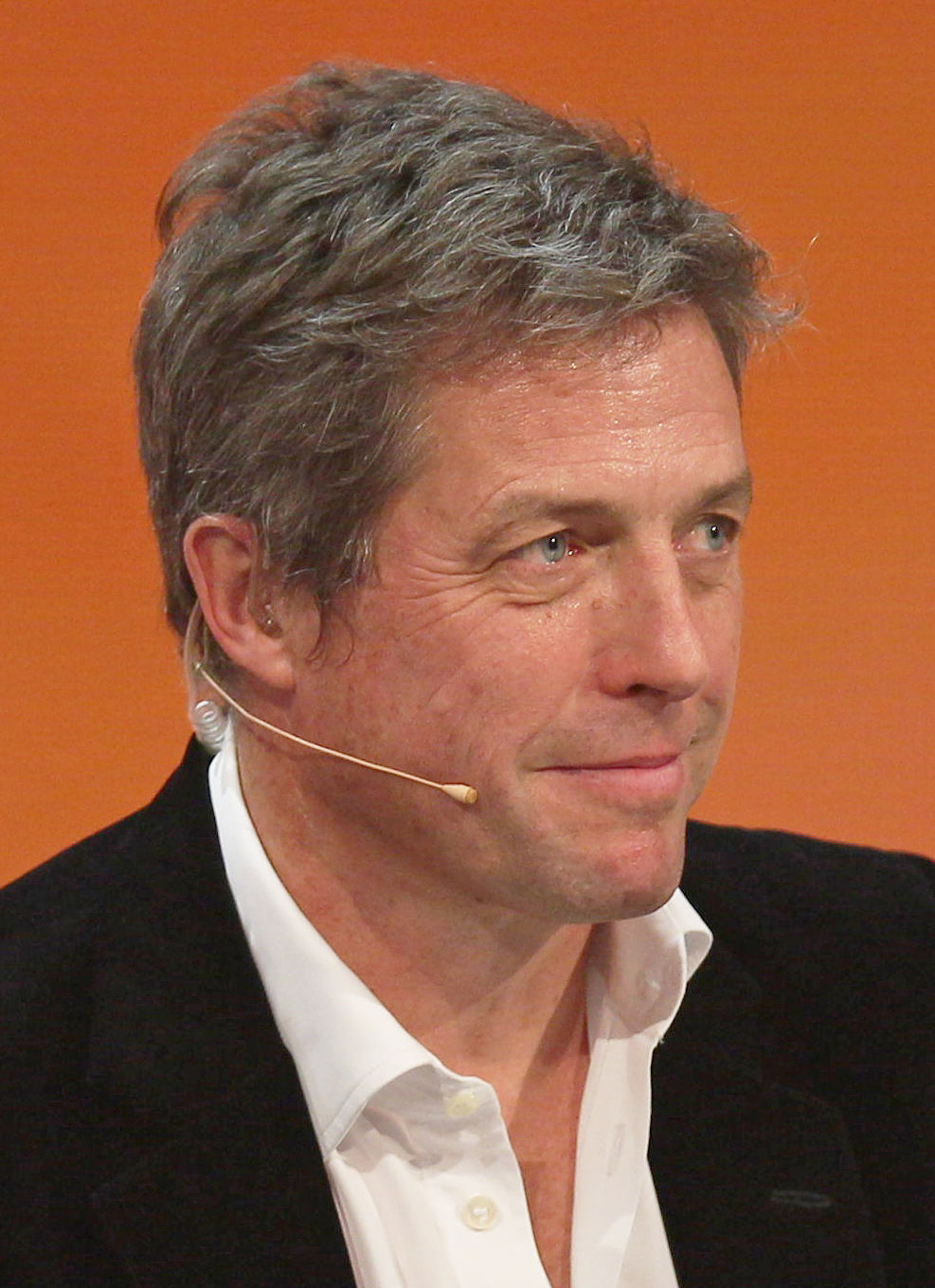
Hugh Grant

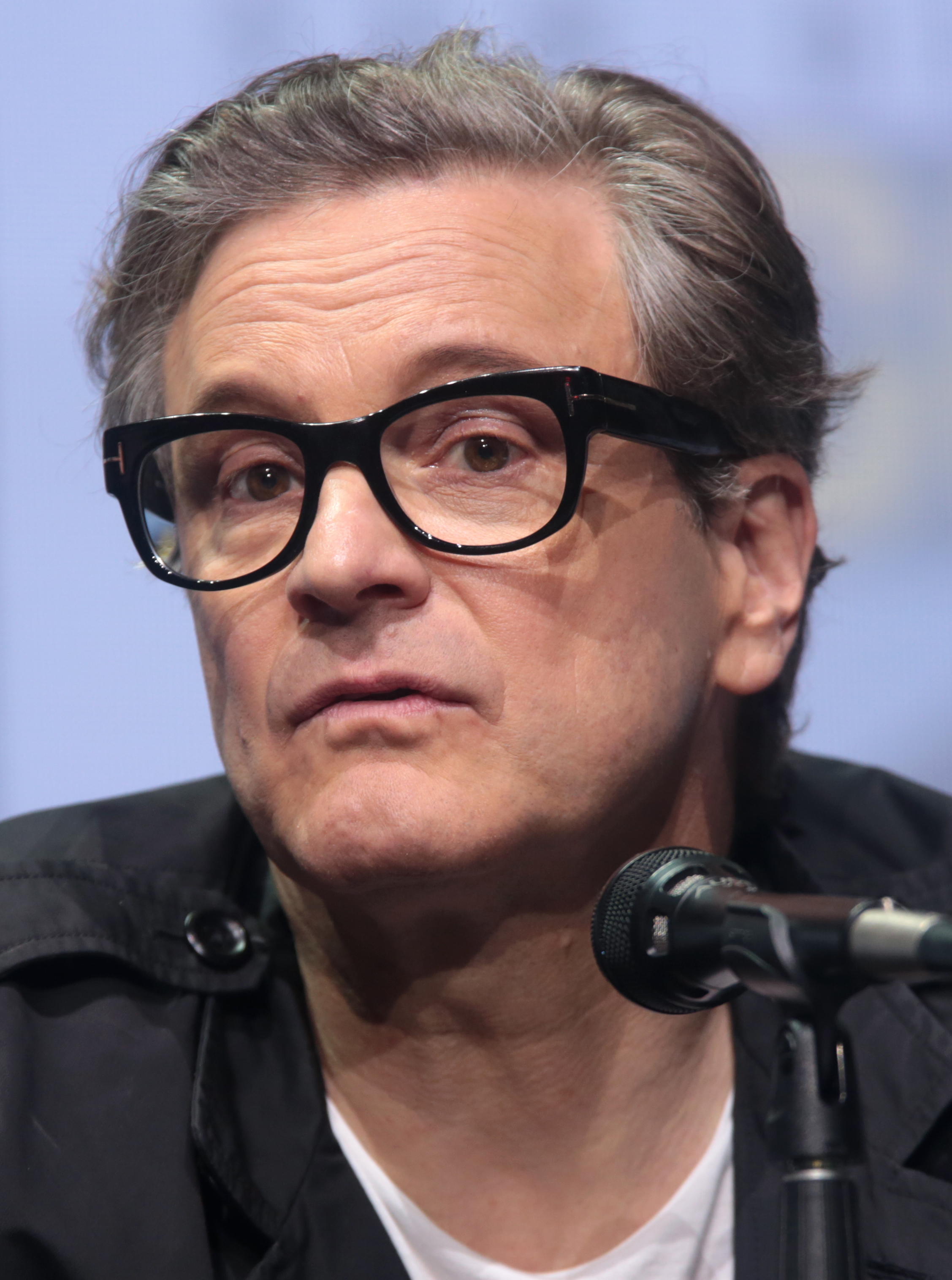
Colin Firth

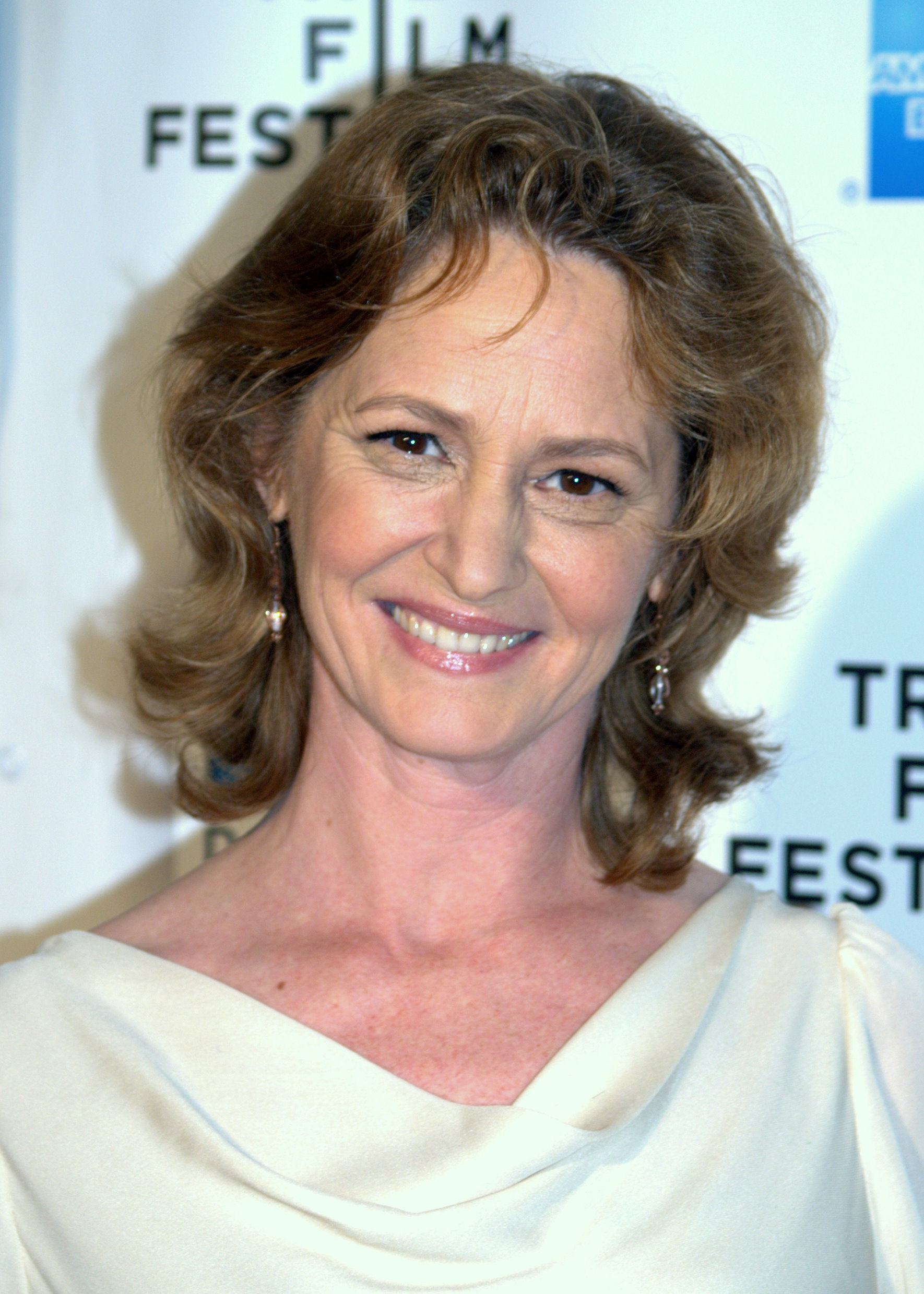
Melissa Leo

- September 4 – Damon Wayans, African-American actor and comedian
- September 5
  - Karita Mattila, Finnish soprano
  - Dayo Wong, Hong Kong actor and stand-up comedian
- September 7 – Phillip Rhee, American actor, producer and writer
- September 9
  - Hugh Grant, English actor
  - Johnson Righeira, Italian singer-songwriter, musician, record producer and actor
- September 10 – Colin Firth, English actor
- September 12
  - Robert John Burke, American actor
  - Barham Salih, Iraqi Kurdish politician, 8th President of Iraq
- September 13 – Kevin Carter, South African photojournalist (d. 1994)
- September 14
  - Melissa Leo, American actress
  - Callum Keith Rennie, Canadian actor
- September 18 – Elena Valenciano, Spanish politician
- September 17
  - Alan Krueger, American economist (d. 2019)
  - Damon Hill, British 1996 Formula 1 world champion
  - Kevin Clash, American actor and puppeteer
- September 19 – Yolanda Saldívar, American murderer of tejano singer Selena
- September 21 – David James Elliott, Canadian-American actor
- September 22 – Scott Baio, American actor
- September 25 – Eduardo Yáñez, Mexican film and television actor
- September 28 - Socrates Villegas, Filipino archbishop

=== October ===
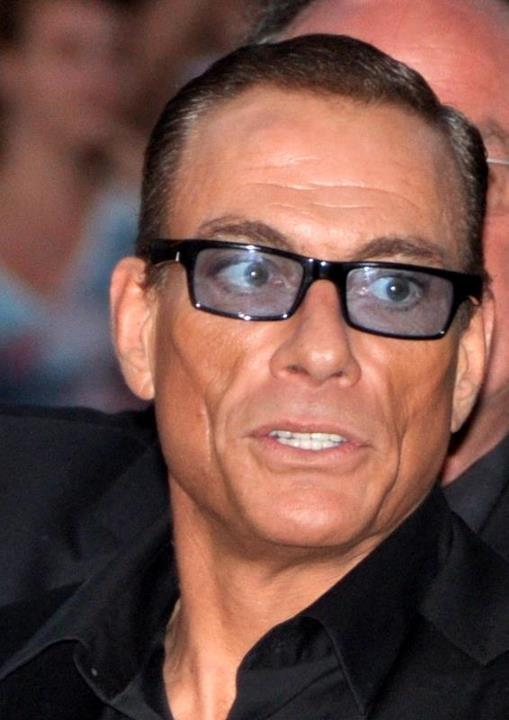
Jean-Claude Van Damme

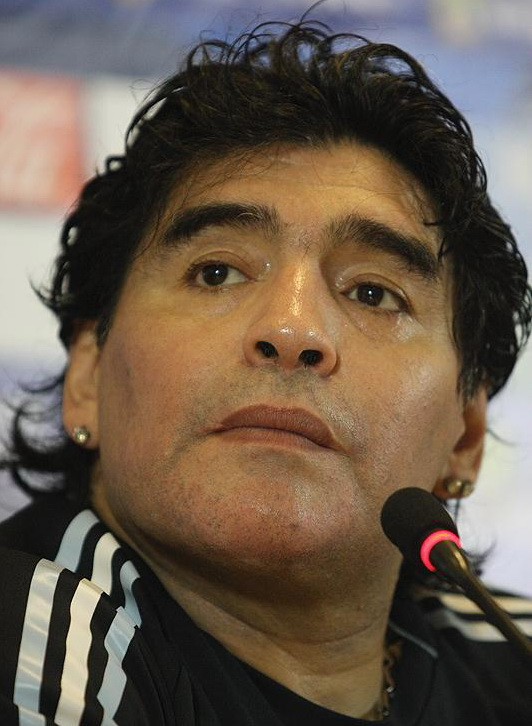
Diego Maradona

- October 1 – Gilles Dyan, French art dealer
- October 4 – Ana Botín, Spanish banker
- October 5 – Careca, Brazilian footballer
- October 8 – Rano Karno, Indonesian actor and politician
- October 9 – Scott Moore (Nebraska politician), American politician and railroad executive
- October 10 – Eric Martin, American singer (Mr. Big)
- October 17 – Bernie Nolan, Irish actress and singer (The Nolans) (d. 2013)
- October 18
  - Jean-Claude Van Damme, Belgian actor and martial artist
  - Erin Moran, American actress (d. 2017)
- October 24
  - BD Wong, American actor
  - Jaime Garzón, Colombian journalist and comedian (d. 1999)
- October 30 – Diego Maradona, Argentine footballer (d. 2020)
- October 31
  - Luis Fortuño, Puerto Rican politician, Governor of Puerto Rico (2009–2013)
  - Reza Pahlavi, Crown Prince of Iran

=== November ===
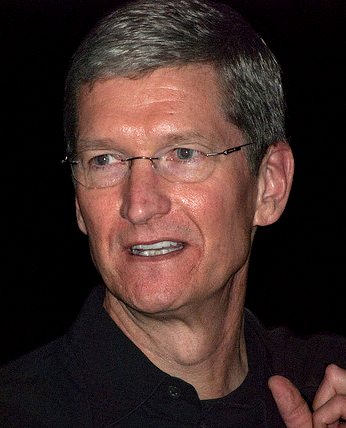
Tim Cook

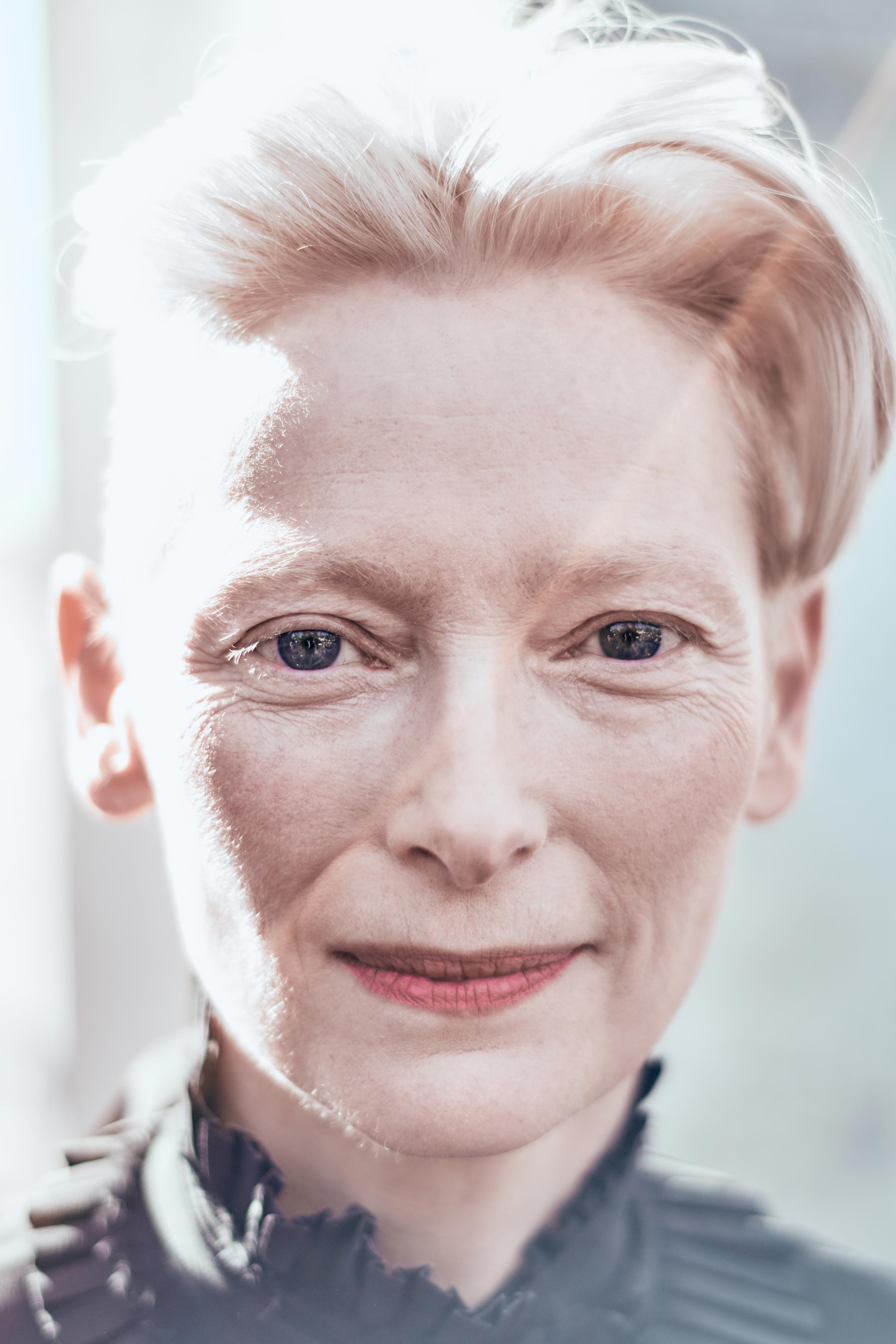
Tilda Swinton

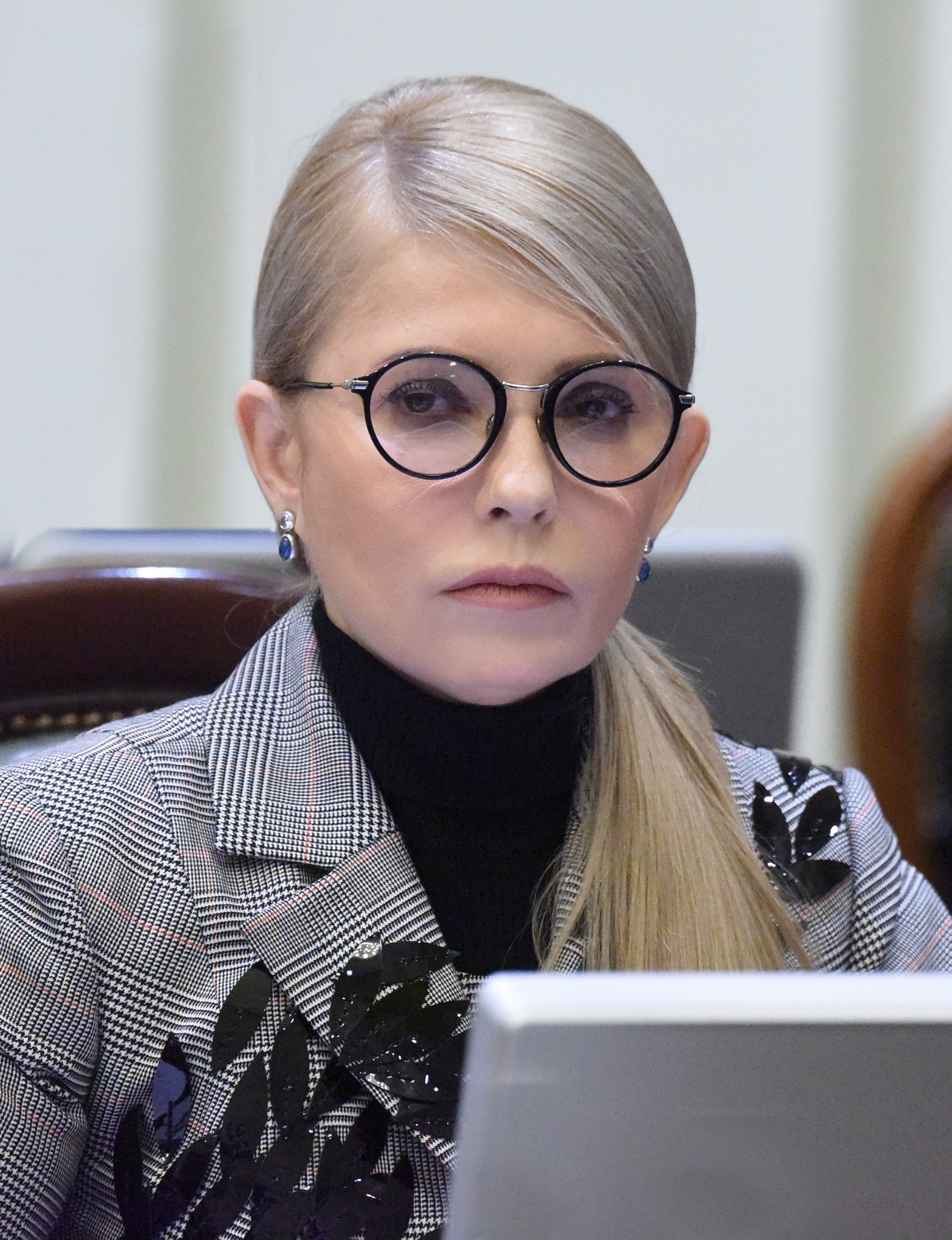
Yulia Tymoshenko

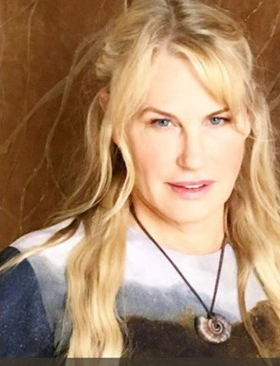
Daryl Hannah

- November 1 – Tim Cook, American businessman and current CEO of Apple, Inc
- November 3 – Karch Kiraly, American volleyball player
- November 4 – Siniša Glavašević, Croatian reporter (d. 1991)
- November 5 – Tilda Swinton, British actress
- November 7 – Tommy Thayer, American guitarist (Kiss)
- November 8
  - Megan Cavanaugh, American actress
  - Michael Nyqvist, Swedish actor (d. 2017)
- November 9
  - Andreas Brehme, German football player and manager (d. 2024)
  - Joëlle Ursull, Guadeloupean singer
- November 10 – Neil Gaiman, English author
- November 11 –
  - Stanley Tucci, American actor and film director
  - Christy Essien-Igbokwe, Nigerian actress and musician (d. 2011)
- November 12 – Maurane, Belgian singer and actress (d. 2018)
- November 15 – Susanne Lothar, German actress (d. 2012)
- November 17
  - Jonathan Ross, English television presenter
  - RuPaul, American drag queen and entertainer
- November 18
  - Elizabeth Perkins, American actress
  - Kim Wilde, English pop singer, DJ and television presenter.
- November 19
  - Miss Elizabeth, American professional wrestling valet (d. 2003)
  - Hiroshi Naka, Japanese voice actor
- November 20 – Marc Labrèche, Canadian actor and television host
- November 23 – Jayananda Warnaweera, Sri Lankan cricketer and sports administrator (d. 2025)
- November 24
  - Tommy Lane, American professional wrestler
  - Amanda Wyss, American actress
- November 25
  - Robert Dunlop, Northern Irish motorcycle racer (d. 2008)
  - Amy Grant, American Christian and pop musician
  - John F. Kennedy Jr., American lawyer, journalist and son of 35th President John F. Kennedy (d. 1999)
- November 27
  - Eike Immel, German football player and manager
  - Tim Pawlenty, American politician
  - Yulia Tymoshenko, Prime Minister of Ukraine in 2005 and 2007–2010
- November 29 – Cathy Moriarty, American actress
- November 30
  - Rich Fields, American television personality
  - Gary Lineker, English footballer and sports presenter
  - Michael O'Connor, Australian rugby league and rugby union player

=== December ===
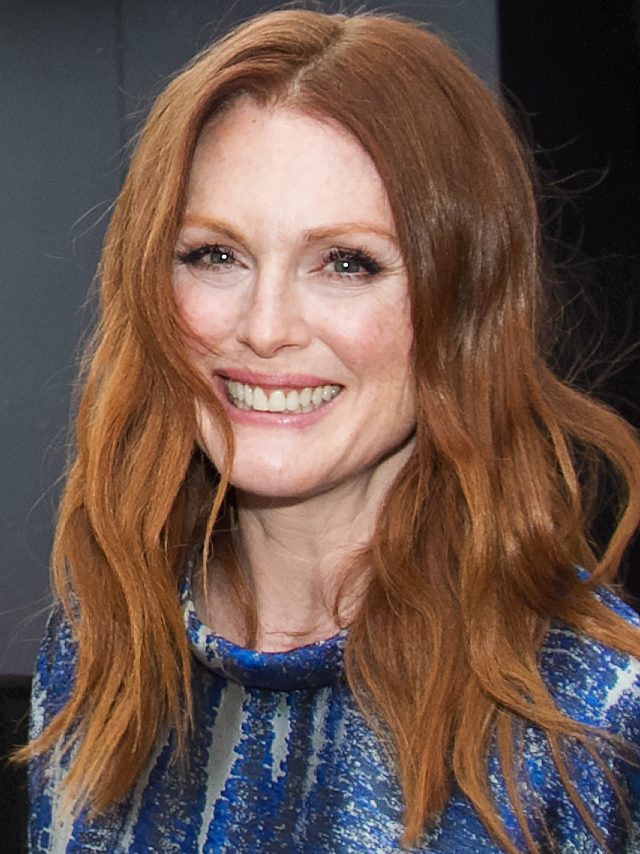
Julianne Moore

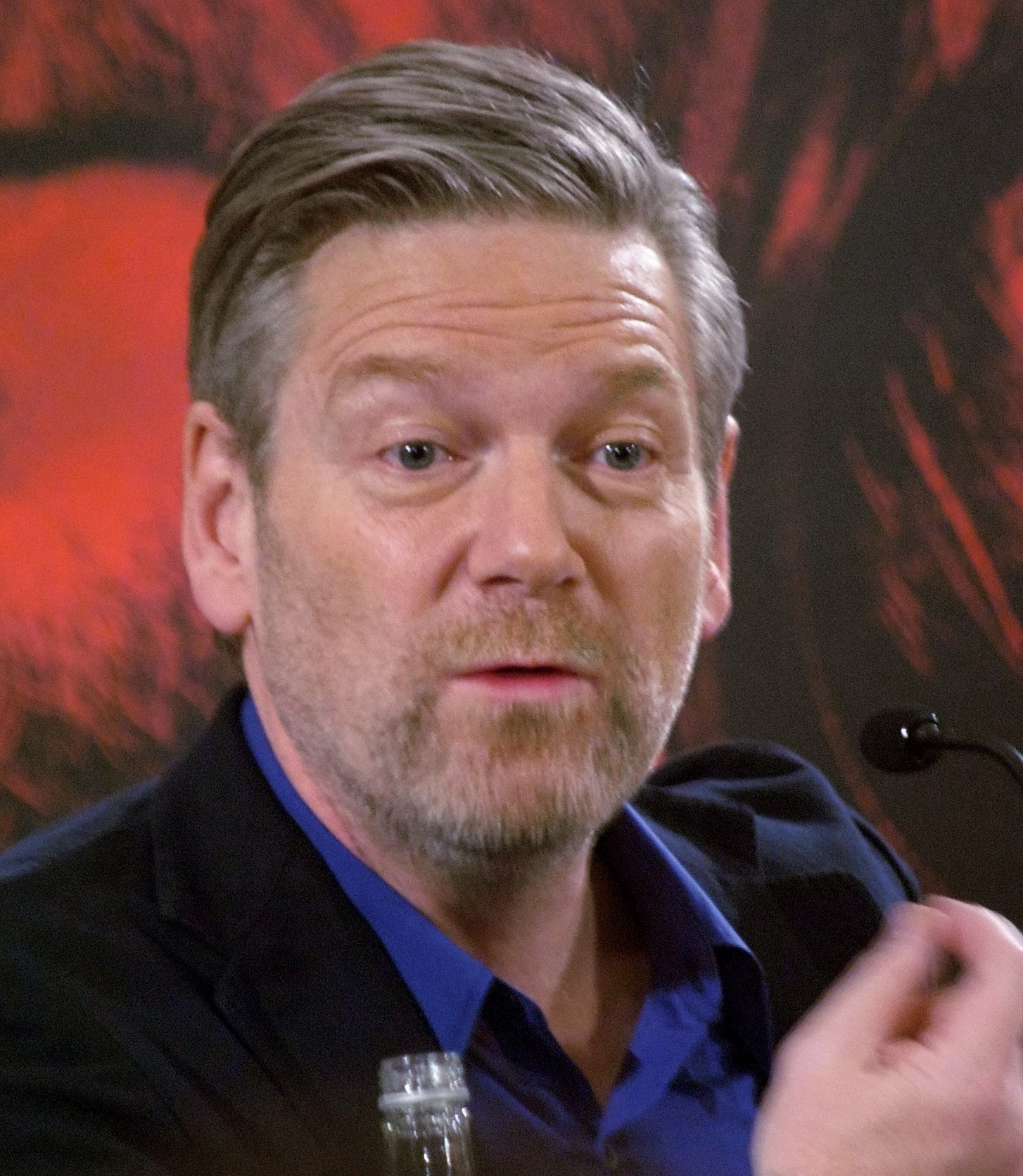
Kenneth Branagh

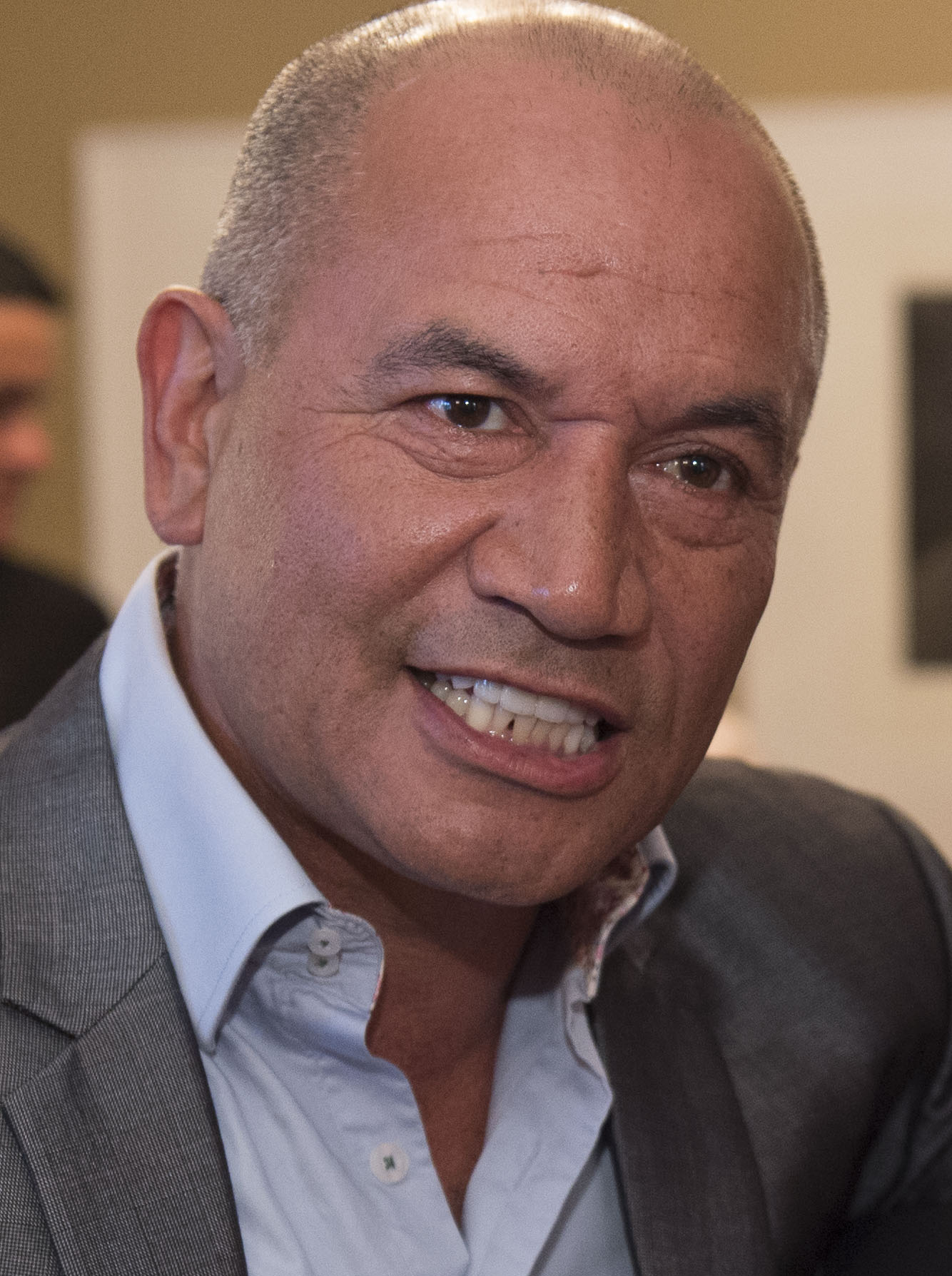
Temuera Morrison

- December 1
  - Carol Alt, American model and actress
  - Lanny Cordola, American rock guitarist (Giuffria, House of Lords)
- December 2
  - Deb Haaland, American politician, Governor-elect of New Mexico, 54th Secretary of the Interior
  - Rick Savage, English rock bassist (Def Leppard)
  - Silk Smitha, Indian actress (d.1996)
- December 3
  - Daryl Hannah, American actress and environmental activist
  - Julianne Moore, American actress and children's author
- December 4
  - Glynis Nunn, Australian athlete
  - Fred Ramsdell, American immunologist
- December 8 – Lim Guan Eng, Malaysian politician, Chief Minister of Penang
- December 10 – Sir Kenneth Branagh, Northern Irish actor and director
- December 12 – Volker Beck, German politician
- December 14 – Ebrahim Raisi, Iranian politician, 8th President of Iran (d. 2024)
- December 17 – Tarako, Japanese voice actress
- December 18 – Kazuhide Uekusa, Japanese economist
- December 19 – Michelangelo Signorile, American journalist, author and talk radio host
- December 20 – Kim Ki-duk, South Korean director and screenwriter (d. 2020)
- December 22 – Jean-Michel Basquiat, American musician and graffiti painter (d. 1988)
- December 26 – Temuera Morrison, New Zealand actor
- December 27 – Maryam d'Abo, British actress
- December 28 – Ray Bourque, Canadian ice hockey player
- December 29 – Dave Pelzer, American author

== Deaths ==
=== January ===
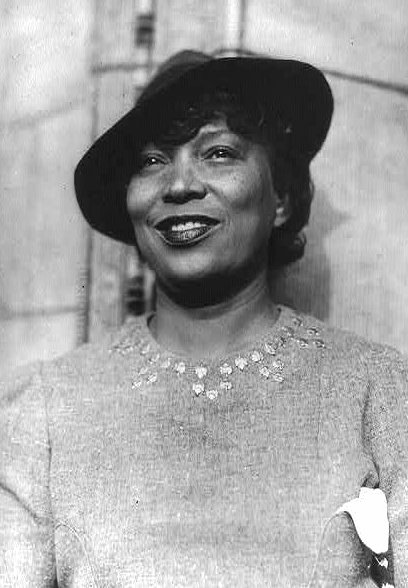
Zora Neale Hurston

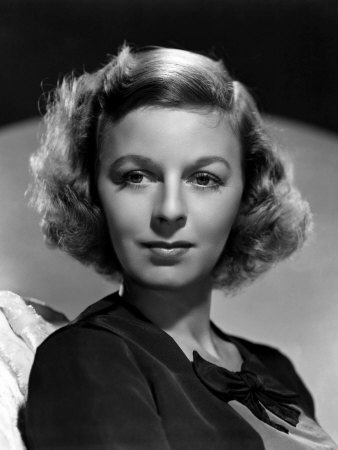
Margaret Sullavan

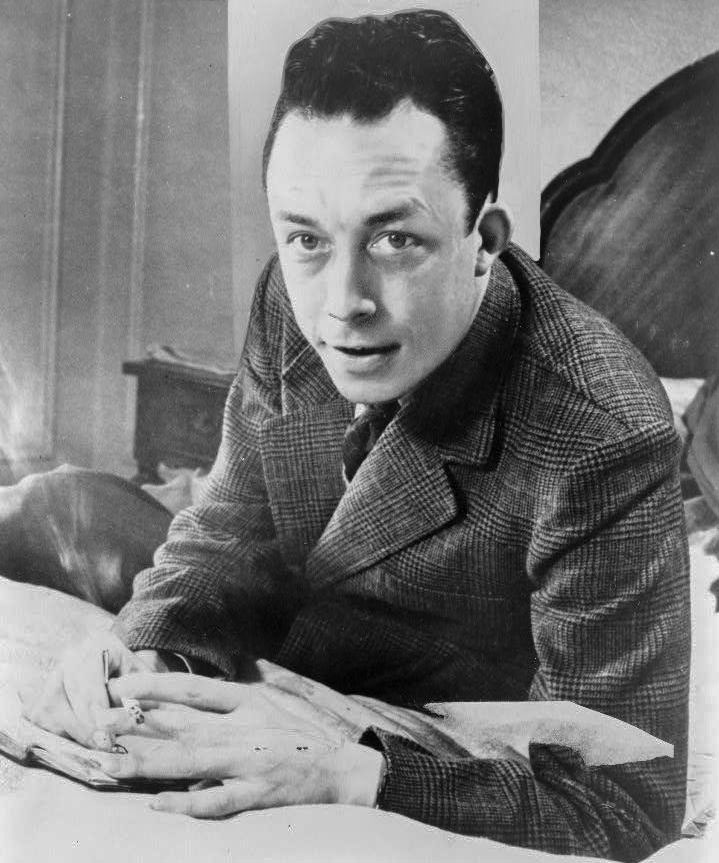
Albert Camus

Prince Ferdinand Pius, Duke of Calabria

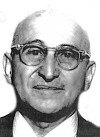
Beno Gutenberg

- January 1
  - Gianni Franciolini, Italian director and screenwriter (b. 1910)
  - Margaret Sullavan, American actress (b. 1909; accidental overdose)
- January 2 – Fausto Coppi, Italian cyclist (b. 1919)
- January 3 – Victor Sjöström, Swedish actor (b. 1879)
- January 4
  - Albert Camus, French writer, Nobel Prize winner, automobile accident (b. 1913)
  - Dudley Nichols, American screenwriter (b. 1895)
- January 5 – Donald Knight, English cricketer (b. 1894)
- January 7 – Dorothea Chambers, English tennis champion (b. 1878)
- January 9 – Elsie J. Oxenham, English children's novelist (b. 1880)
- January 11 – Isabel Emslie Hutton, Scottish nurse in Serbia during World War I and psychiatrist (b. 1887)
- January 12 – Nevil Shute, English-born novelist (b. 1899)
- January 19 – Dadasaheb Torne, Indian filmmaker (b. 1890)
- January 24 – Edwin Fischer, Swiss pianist and conductor (b. 1886)
- January 25
  - Diana Barrymore, American stage and film actress (b. 1921)
  - Rutland Boughton, English composer (b. 1878)
  - Beno Gutenberg, German-American seismologist (b. 1889)
- January 27 – Osvaldo Aranha, Brazilian politician (b. 1894)
- January 28 – Zora Neale Hurston, American folklorist, anthropologist and author (b. 1891)

=== February ===
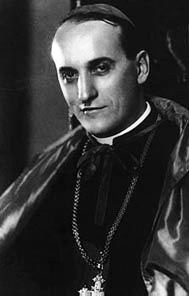
Blessed Aloysius Stepinac

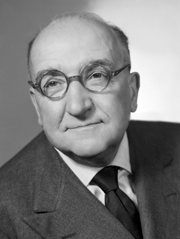
Adone Zoli

- February 2 – Swami Bharati Krishna Tirtha, Hindu teacher (b. 1884)
- February 3 – Fred Buscaglione, Italian singer and actor (b. 1921)
- February 6 – Jesse Belvin, American urban singer (b. 1932)
- February 7 – Igor Kurchatov, Soviet physicist (b. 1903)
- February 8
  - J. L. Austin, British philosopher (b. 1911)
  - Sir Giles Gilbert Scott, British architect (b. 1880)
- February 9
  - Adolph Coors III, American brewer and kidnap victim (b. 1916)
  - Ernst von Dohnányi, Hungarian conductor (b. 1877)
- February 10 – Aloysius Stepinac, Yugoslav Roman Catholic prelate (b. 1898)
- February 14 – Masatomi Kimura, Japanese admiral (b. 1891)
- February 20
  - Leonard Woolley, English archaeologist (b. 1880)
  - Adone Zoli, Italian politician, 35th Prime Minister of Italy (b. 1887)
- February 29
  - Jacques Becker, French director (b. 1906)
  - Edwina Mountbatten, Countess Mountbatten of Burma (b. 1901), last Vicereine of India
  - Melvin Purvis, American lawman and FBI agent (b. 1903)

=== March ===
- March 2 – Stanisław Taczak, Polish general (b. 1874)
- March 4 – Leonard Warren, American opera singer (b. 1911)
- March 9 – Jack Beattie, Irish politician (b. 1886)
- March 11
  - Roy Chapman Andrews, American explorer, adventurer and naturalist (b. 1884)
  - Takuma Kajiwara, Japanese-born American photographer (b.1876)
- March 13
  - Louis Wagner, French Grand Prix racer, aviator (b. 1882)
  - Yosef Zvi HaLevy, Israeli rabbi and judge (b. 1874)
- March 14 – Oliver Kirk, American Olympic boxer (b. 1884)
- March 22 – José Antonio Aguirre, Spanish politician (b. 1904)
- March 23 – Franklin P. Adams, American journalist (b. 1881)
- March 26 – Ian Keith, American actor (b. 1899)
- March 27
  - Mario Talavera, Mexican songwriter (b. 1885)
  - Gregorio Marañón, Spanish physician, scientist, historian and philosopher. (b. 1887)

=== April ===
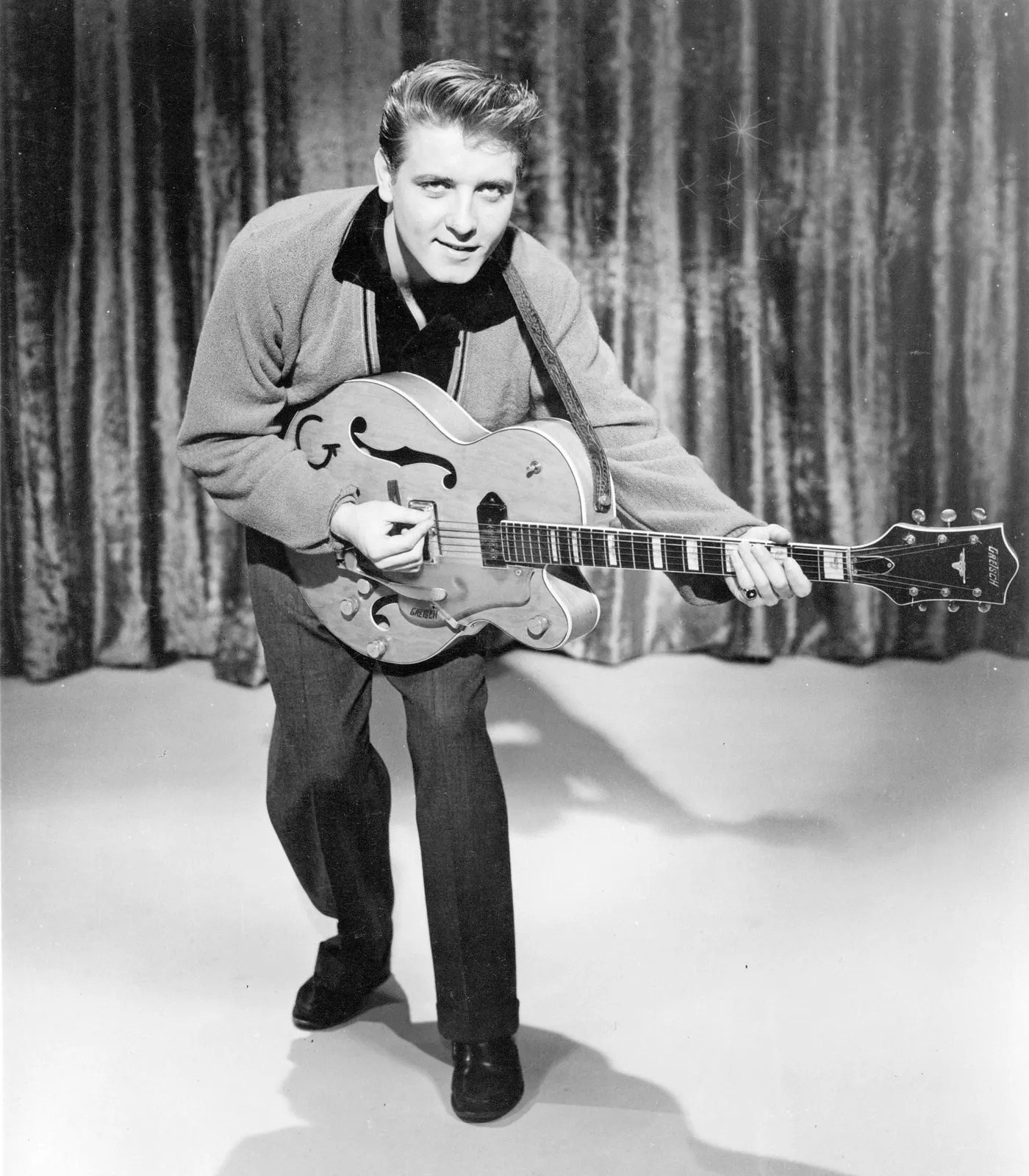
Eddie Cochran

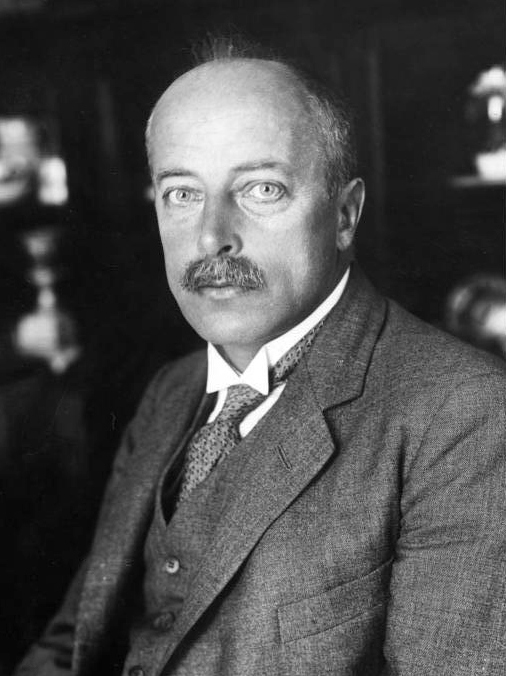
Max von Laue

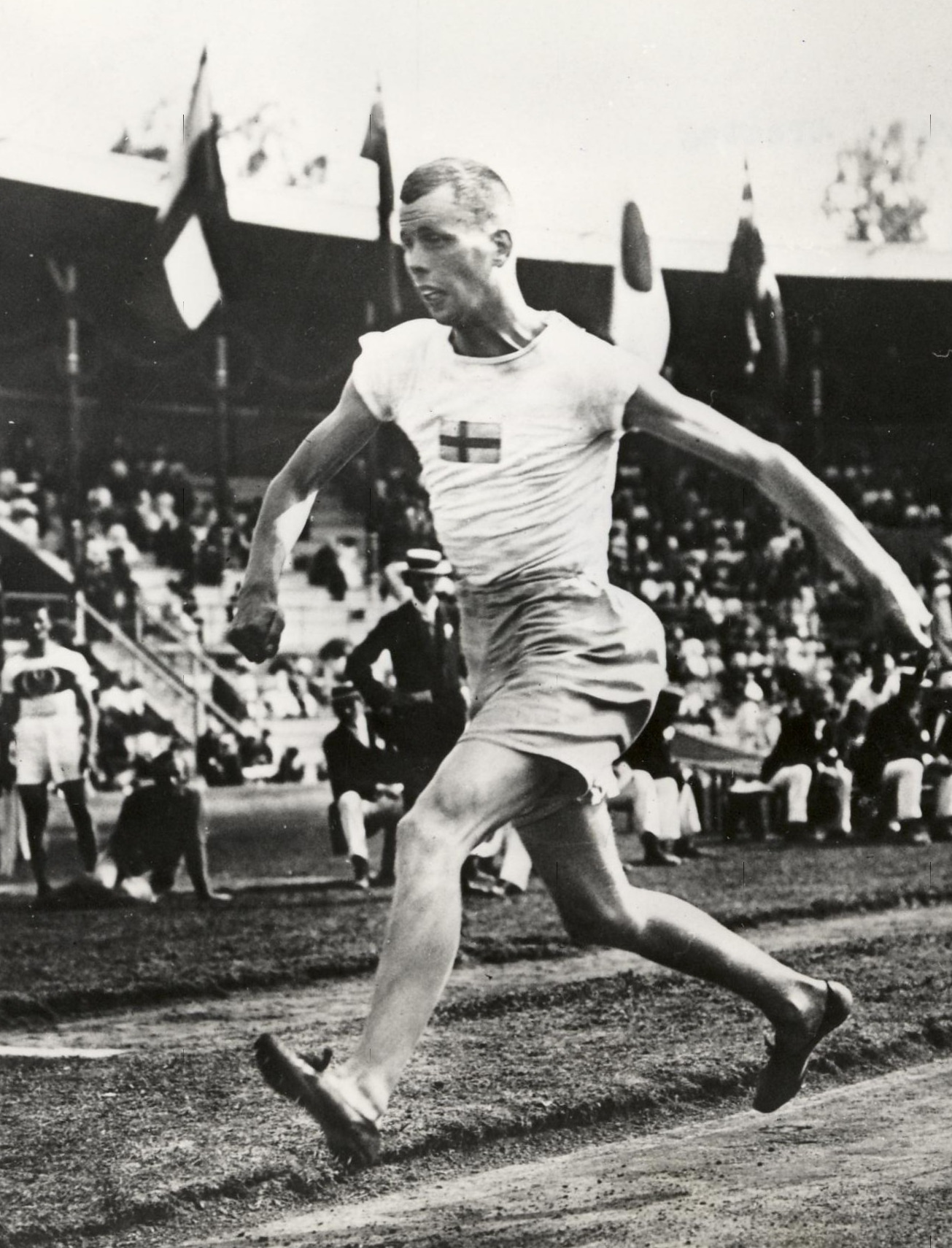
Gustaf Lindblom

- April 1
  - Abdul Rahman of Negeri Sembilan, King of Malaysia (b. 1895)
  - Madeleine Rolland, French translator and peace activist (b. 1872)
- April 3 – Norodom Suramarit, King of Cambodia (b. 1896)
- April 5
  - Cuthbert Burnup, English sportsman (b. 1875)
  - Peter Llewelyn Davies, namesake for Peter Pan (b. 1897)
  - Alma Kruger, American actress (b. 1868)
- April 10 – Arthur Benjamin, Australian composer (b. 1893)
- April 17 – Eddie Cochran, American rock singer (b. 1938)
- April 24
  - Max von Laue, German physicist, Nobel Prize laureate (b. 1879)
  - George Relph, English actor (b. 1888)
- April 25
  - Amānullāh Khān, Emir and King of Afghanistan (b. 1892)
  - Turan Emeksiz, Turkish student killed during the demonstrations (b. 1940)
- April 26 – Gustaf Lindblom, Swedish Olympic athlete (b. 1891)
- April 28 – Carlos Ibáñez del Campo, Chilean army officer and political figure, 20th President of Chile (b. 1877)

=== May ===
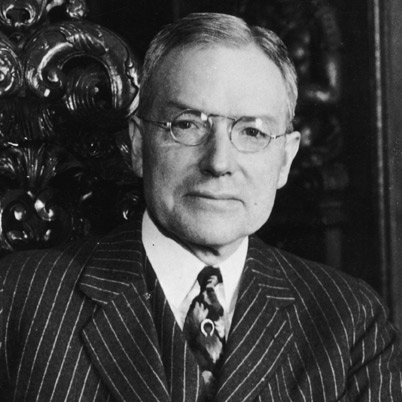
John D. Rockefeller Jr.

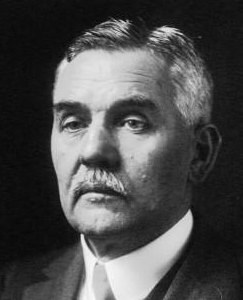
Georges Claude

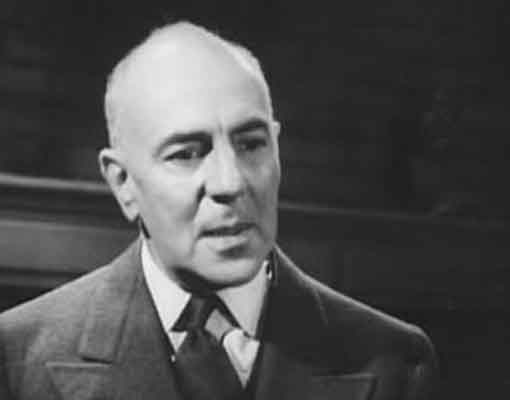
George Zucco

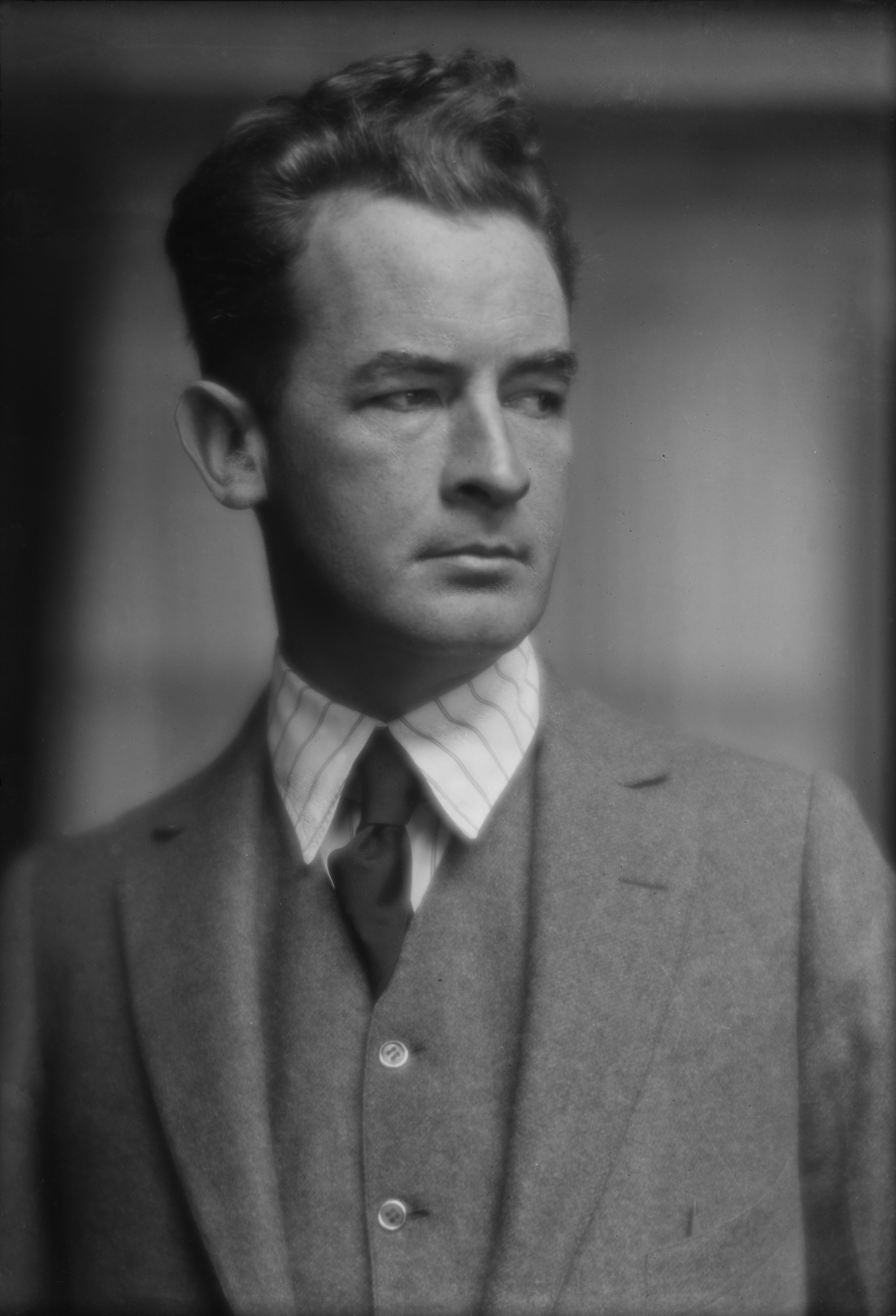
James Montgomery Flagg

- May 1 – Sergei Safronov, Soviet fighter pilot (b. 1930)
- May 2 – Caryl Chessman, American criminal (executed) (b. 1921)
- May 3 – Masa Niemi, Finnish actor (b. 1914)
- May 8
  - Sir Hersch Lauterpacht, British international lawyer (b. 1897)
  - J. H. C. Whitehead, British mathematician (b. 1904)
- May 11 – John D. Rockefeller Jr., American philanthropist (b. 1874)
- May 12 – Prince Aly Khan, Pakistani United Nations ambassador (b. 1911)
- May 14 – Lucrezia Bori, Spanish opera singer (b. 1887)
- May 22 – İbrahim Çallı, Turkish painter (b. 1882)
- May 23
  - Georges Claude, French inventor (b. 1870)
  - The Great Gama, Punjabi wrestler (b. 1878)
- May 24 – Avraham Arnon, Israeli educator and a recipient of the Israel Prize (b. 1887)
- May 25 – Rafael Gómez Ortega, Spanish bullfighter (b. 1882)
- May 27
  - Edward Brophy, American character actor (b. 1895)
  - James Montgomery Flagg, American artist, comics artist and illustrator (b. 1877)
  - George Zucco, English-born character actor (b. 1886)
- May 30 – Boris Pasternak, Russian writer, Nobel Prize laureate (declined) (b. 1890)
- May 31 – Walther Funk, German Nazi politician (b. 1890)

=== June ===
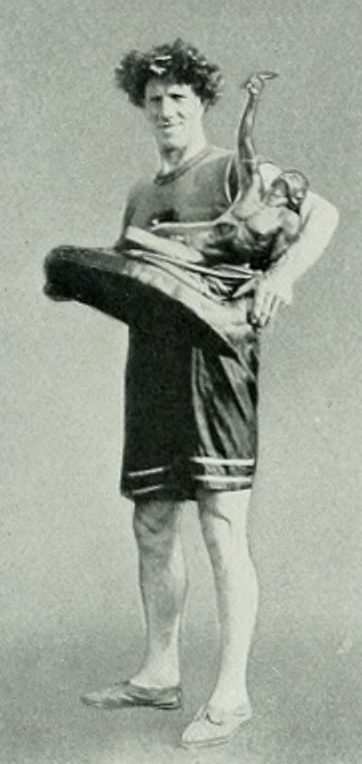
Ken McArthur

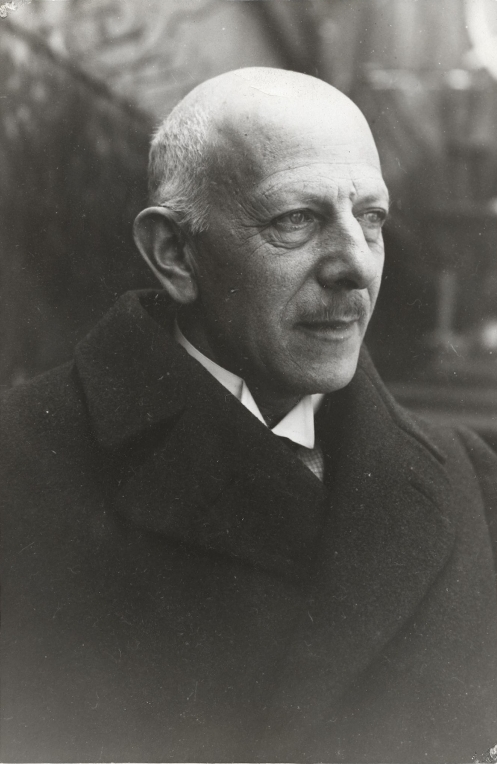
Otto Ender

- June 3 – Ana Pauker, Romanian politician (b. 1893)
- June 4
  - Amy Ellerman, American contralto and voice teacher (b. 1887)
  - Józef Haller, Polish general (b. 1873)
  - Lucien Littlefield, American actor (b. 1895)
- June 13 – Ken McArthur, South African athlete (b. 1881)
- June 14
  - Natalia Martirosyan, Armenian engineer (b. 1889)
  - Ana Pauker, Romanian communist politician (b. 1893)
- June 17 – Arthur Rosson, English film director (b. 1886)
- June 18 – Shalva Aleksi-Meskhishvili, Georgian politician (b. 1884)
- June 19 – Chris Bristow, English race car driver (b. 1937)
- June 20 – William E. Fairbairn, English soldier, police officer and hand-to-hand combat expert (b. 1885)
- June 25
  - Walter Baade, German astronomer (b. 1893)
  - Otto Ender, Austrian political figure, 8th Chancellor of Austria (b. 1875)
- June 27 – Lottie Dod, English tennis player; Wimbledon women's champion, 1887–88, 1891–93 (b. 1871)
- June 28
  - Móric Esterházy, Hungarian aristocrat and politician, 18th Prime Minister of Hungary (b. 1881)
  - Jaume Vicens i Vives, Spanish historian (b. 1910)

=== July ===
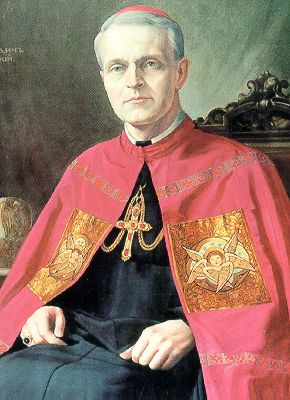
Pavel Peter Gojdič

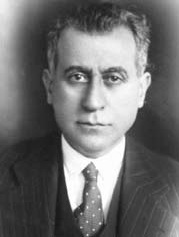
Hasan Saka

- July 2 – Margherita Bagni, Italian actress (b. 1902)
- July 6
  - Aneurin Bevan, Welsh politician (b. 1897)
  - Hans Wilsdorf, German-Swiss watchmaker, founder of Rolex (b. 1881)
- July 7 – Francis Browne, Irish Jesuit priest, famous for his last photos of the RMS Titanic (b. 1880)
- July 12
  - Buddy Adler, American film producer (b. 1909)
  - Francis Xavier Gsell, Australian Roman Catholic bishop and missionary (b. 1872)
- July 14 – Maurice de Broglie, French physicist (b. 1875)
- July 15
  - Anton Giulio Bragaglia, Italian cinematographer (b. 1890)
  - Set Persson, Swedish politician (b. 1897)
  - Lawrence Tibbett, American opera singer and actor (b. 1896)
- July 16
  - Albert Kesselring, German field marshal (b. 1885)
  - John P. Marquand, American novelist (b. 1893)
  - Manuel Gamio, Mexican anthropologist and archaeologist (b. 1883)
- July 17
  - Pavel Peter Gojdič, Czechoslovak Roman Catholic monk and blessed (b. 1888)
  - Maud Menten, Canadian biochemist (b. 1879)
- July 22 – Yan Xishan, Chinese warlord and politician (b. 1883)
- July 24 – Hans Albers, German actor and singer (b. 1891)
- July 26 – Cedric Gibbons, Irish-American art director (b. 1893)
- July 27 – Georgi Kyoseivanov, 27th Prime Minister of Bulgaria (b. 1884)
- July 28 – Enrique Amorim, Uruguayan novelist (b. 1900)
- July 29 – Hasan Saka, 7th Prime Minister of Turkey (b. 1885)

=== August ===
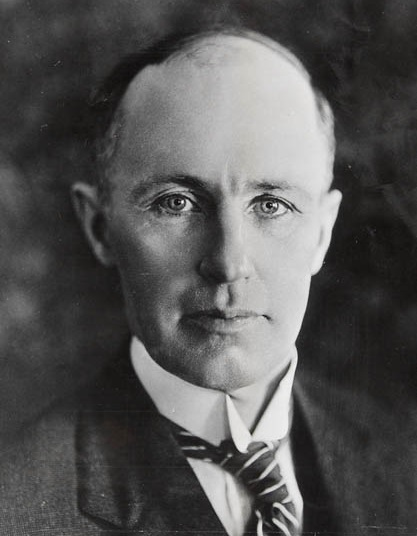
Arthur Meighen

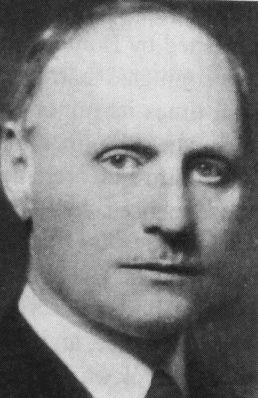
Carlo Emilio Bonferroni

- August 2 – Francesca French, British Protestant missionary (b. 1871)
- August 5 – Arthur Meighen, 9th Prime Minister of Canada (b. 1874)
- August 7
  - Walden L. Ainsworth, American admiral (b. 1886)
  - Luis Ángel Firpo, Argentine boxer (b. 1894)
- August 10
  - Frank Lloyd, British-born American film director (b. 1886)
  - Oswald Veblen, American mathematician, geometer and topologist (b. 1880)
- August 14 – Fred Clarke, American baseball player (Pittsburgh Pirates) and a member of the MLB Hall of Fame (b. 1872)
- August 17 – Charles W. Ryder, American general (b. 1892)
- August 18 – Carlo Emilio Bonferroni, Italian mathematician (b. 1892)
- August 22
  - Eduard Pütsep, Estonian wrestler (b. 1898)
  - Johannes Sikkar, Estonian politician (b. 1897)
- August 23
  - Jersey Flegg, English-Australian rugby league player and chairman (b. 1878)
  - Oscar Hammerstein II, American librettist (b. 1895)
- August 27 – Stanley Clifford Weyman, American impostor (b. 1890)
- August 28 – Sir Charles Forbes, British admiral (b. 1880)
- August 29
  - Hazza' al-Majali, Prime Minister of Jordan, assassinated (b. 1917)
  - Vicki Baum, Austrian novelist (b. 1888)
  - David Diop, French West African poet (b. 1927)

=== September ===
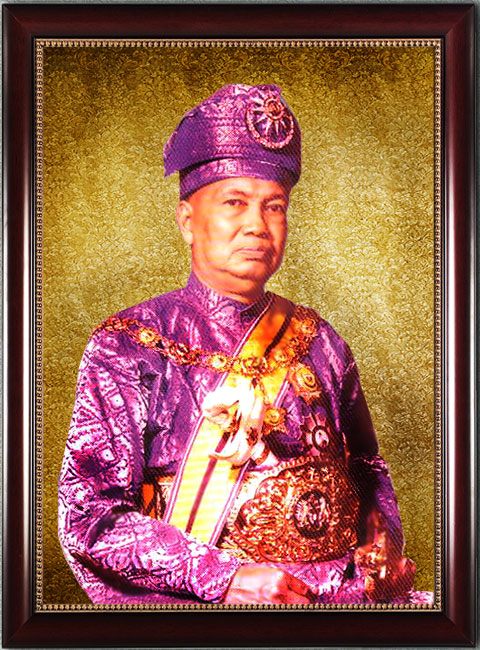
King Hisamuddin Alam Shah ibni Almarhum Sultan Alaeddin Sulaiman Shah

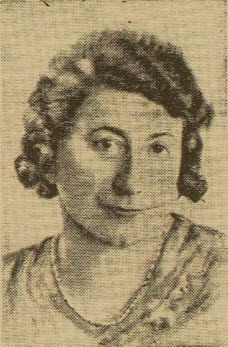
Lucie Randoin

- September 1 – Hisamuddin of Selangor, King of Malaysia (b. 1898)
- September 4 – Alfred E. Green, American film director (b. 1889)
- September 8
  - Feroze Gandhi, Indian politician (b. 1912)
  - Oscar Pettiford, American jazz string player (b. 1922)
- September 9 – Jussi Björling, Swedish tenor (b. 1911)
- September 11 – Edwin Justus Mayer, American screenwriter (b. 1896)
- September 13
  - Lucie Randoin, French biologist, nutritionist, expert in dietary significance of vitamins (b. 1888)
  - Leó Weiner, Hungarian composer (b. 1885)
- September 20
  - Ida Rubinstein, Russian ballet dancer (b. 1883)
  - Ernest William Goodpasture, American pathologist and physician (b. 1886)
- September 22 – Melanie Klein, Austrian-British psychoanalyst (b. 1882)
- September 23 – Kathlyn Williams, American stage and silent film actress (b. 1879)
- September 24 – Mátyás Seiber, Hungarian composer (b. 1905)
- September 25 – Emily Post, American etiquette expert (b. 1873)
- September 27 – Sylvia Pankhurst, English suffragette (b. 1882)
- September 29 – Vladimir Dimitrov, Bulgarian artist (b. 1882)
- September 30 – St John Philby, Ceylonese-born British Arabist (b. 1885)

=== October ===
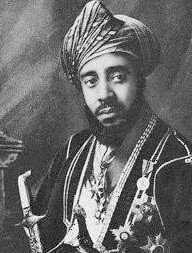
Sultan Khalifa bin Harub of Zanzibar

- October 5 – Alfred L. Kroeber, American anthropologist (b. 1876)
- October 11 – Richard Cromwell, American film actor (b. 1910)
- October 12 – Inejiro Asanuma, Japanese politician (assassinated) (b. 1898)
- October 14 – Abram Ioffe, Soviet physicist (b. 1903)
- October 15
  - Henny Porten, German actress and producer (b. 1890)
  - Clara Kimball Young, American actress (b. 1890)
- October 21
  - Katharine Stewart-Murray, Duchess of Atholl, Scottish aristocrat and politician (b. 1874)
  - Ma Hongbin, Chinese warlord (b. 1884)
- October 24
  - Mitrofan Nedelin, Soviet Chief Marshal of the Artillery, chief of the Strategic Missile Force, Hero of the Soviet Union (b. 1902)
  - Yevgeny Ostashev, Soviet head of the 1st control polygon NIIP-5 (Baikonur), Lenin prize winner (b. 1924)
- October 25 – Harry Ferguson, Irish engineer and inventor (b. 1884)
- October 31 – H. L. Davis, American fiction writer and poet (b. 1894)

=== November ===
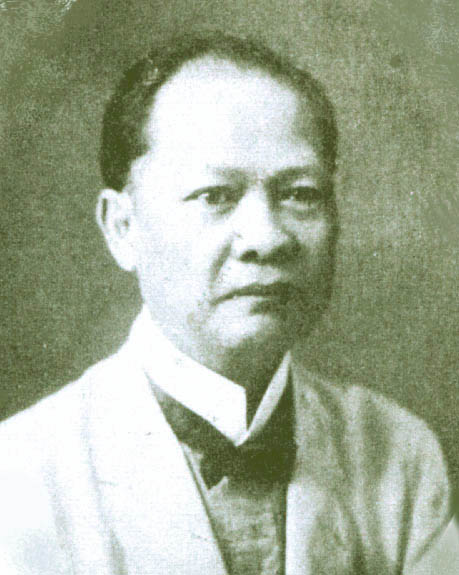
Julio Nakpil

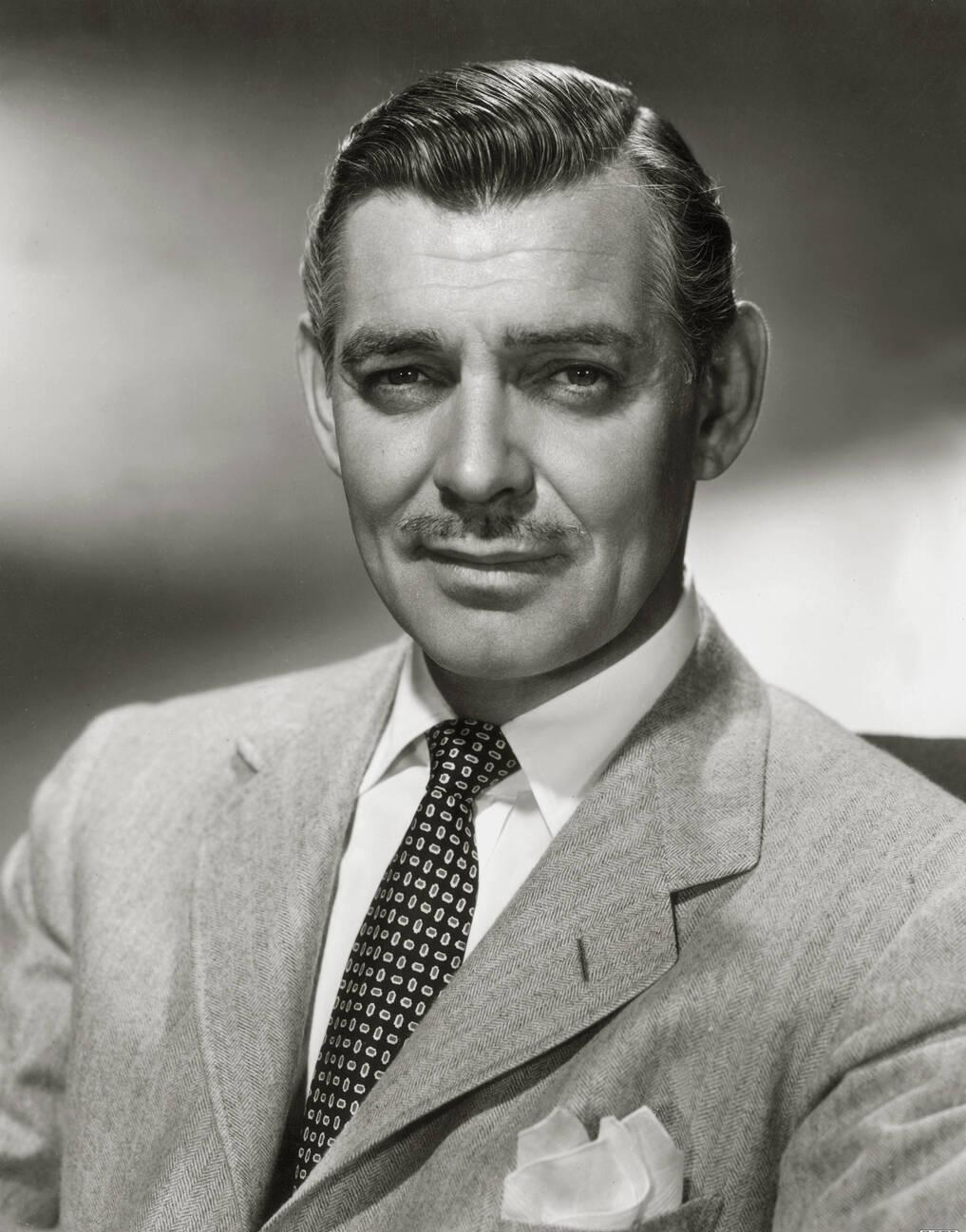
Clark Gable

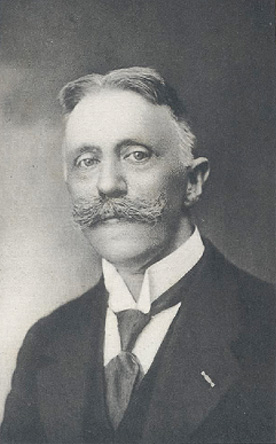
Dirk Jan de Geer

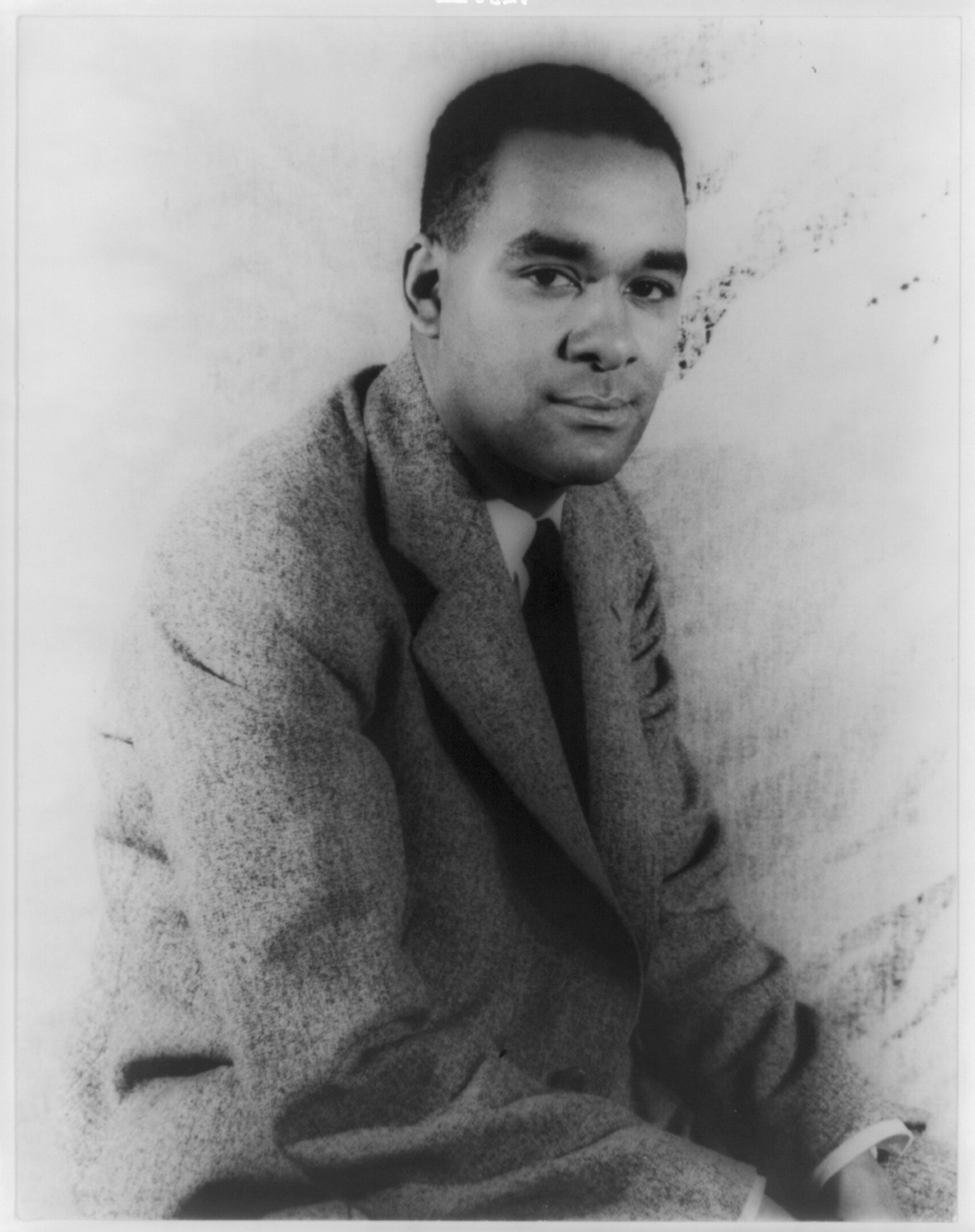
Richard Wright

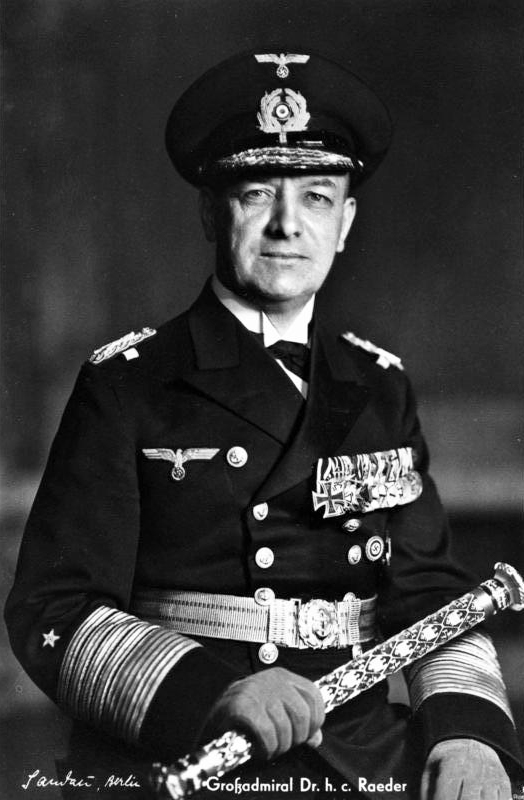
Erich Raeder

- November 2
  - Dimitri Mitropoulos, Greek conductor, pianist and composer (b. 1896)
  - Julio Nakpil, Filipino composer and general (b. 1867)
  - Otoya Yamaguchi, Japanese ultranationalist assassin (suicide) (b. 1943)
- November 3
  - Bobby Wallace, American baseball player (St. Louis Browns) and a member of the MLB Hall of Fame (b. 1873)
  - Sir Harold Spencer Jones, English astronomer (b. 1890)
- November 5
  - Ward Bond, American actor (b. 1903)
  - August Gailit, Estonian writer (b. 1891)
  - Johnny Horton, American country singer (b. 1925)
  - Mack Sennett, Canadian film producer and director (b. 1880)
- November 6
  - Sir John Bonython, Australian businessman and politician (b. 1875)
  - Erich Raeder, German admiral (b. 1876)
- November 7 – A. P. Carter, American singer-songwriter (b. 1891)
- November 11 – Monte Attell, American boxer (b. 1885)
- November 12 – Lord Buckley, American monologist (b. 1906)
- November 16
  - Paul Faure, French Socialist politician (b. 1878)
  - Clark Gable, American actor (b. 1901)
- November 19 – Phyllis Haver, American actress (b. 1899)
- November 23 – Allen Hobbs, 32nd Governor of American Samoa (b. 1889)
- November 24 – Grand Duchess Olga Alexandrovna of Russia, sister of Tsar Nicholas II (b. 1882)
- November 25 – Mirabal sisters: Patria (b. 1924), Minerva (b. 1926) and Maria Teresa Mirabal (b. 1935), three Dominican revolutionaries (and Rufino de la Cruz, their driver) (assassinated)
- November 26 – Helen Hellwig, American tennis player (b. 1874)
- November 28
  - Richard Wright, American novelist (b. 1908)
  - Dirk Jan de Geer, Dutch nobleman, lawyer and politician, 26th Prime Minister of the Netherlands (b. 1870)
- November 29 – Sir Andrew Russell, New Zealand Army general (b. 1868)

=== December ===
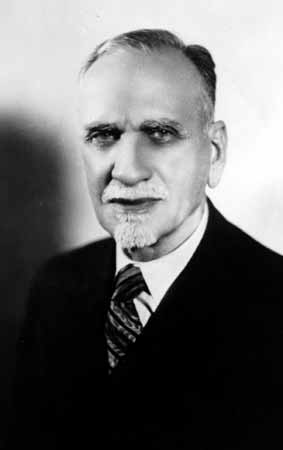
Hashim al-Atassi

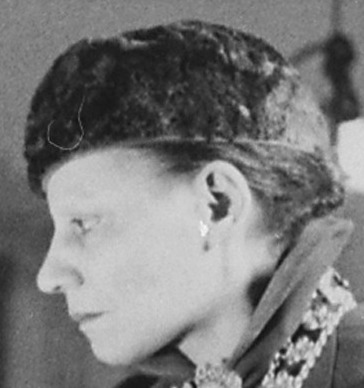
Nancy Elizabeth Prophet

- December 5 – Hashim al-Atassi, Syrian statesman, 2nd Prime Minister of Syria and 4th President of Syria (b. 1875)
- December 7
  - Virginia Balestrieri, Italian actress (b. 1888)
  - Ioannis Demestichas, Greek admiral (b. 1882)
- December 12 – Christopher Hornsrud, 11th Prime Minister of Norway (b. 1859)
- December 13
  - John Charles Thomas, American opera singer (b. 1891)
  - Nancy Elizabeth Prophet, African-American artist known for her sculpture (b. 1890)
- December 14 – Gregory Ratoff, Russian actor and director
- December 22 – Sir Ninian Comper, British architect (b. 1864)
- December 25 – Alberto Maria de Agostini, Italian missionary (b. 1883)
- December 26
  - Giuseppe Mario Bellanca, Italian-American aircraft designer and company founder (b. 1886)
  - Watsuji Tetsuro, Japanese philosopher (b. 1889)

=== Date unknown ===
- Signe Bergman, Swedish suffragist (b. 1869)

== Nobel Prizes ==

- Physics – Donald Arthur Glaser
- Chemistry – Willard Libby
- Physiology or Medicine – Sir Frank Macfarlane Burnet, Peter Medawar
- Literature – Saint-John Perse
- Peace – Albert Lutuli
