= June 6 =

Events on calendar date 6 June

June 6 this year in various calendars
- Saturday, 6 June 2026
Akan	Nkyimemene
Armenian	21 Margach 1475
Aztec	Teotleco 7, 5 Cuāuhtli
Babylonian	19 Ayaru, 2337 SE
Balinese pawukon	Luang, Pepet, Kajeng, Jaya, Wage, Urukung, Saniscara of Julungwangi, Kala, Erangan, Duka
Bengali	23 Joishtho, BS 1433
Chinese	Yin Metal Pig・Girl Mansion; Fire Horse Year, Month 4, Day 21 (Mangzhong, 15 days until Xiazhi)
Common Era	6 June 2026 CE
Coptic	29 Pashons, AM 1742
Egyptian	21 Phaophi, 2775 NE
Ethiopian	29 Genbot, 2018 Amätä Məhrät
French Republican	Décade II, Octidi de Prairial de l'Année 234 de la République
Gregorian	6 June, AD 2026
Hebrew	21 Sivan, AM 5786
Hindu	Dhaniṣṭhā・Indra; Solar: 23 Jyeṣṭha, 1948 SE; Lunisolar: Ṣaṣṭhī, Kṛishna pakṣa of Adhika Jyeṣṭha, 2083 VE; Rāudra・5127 KY・1,872,732
Icelandic	Laugardagur, 15 Skerpla 2026
Islamic	20 Dhu al-Hijjah, AH 1447 (using tabular method)
ISO week date	2026-W23-6
Japanese	21 Uzuki, Reiwa 8 (Bōshu, 15 days until Geshi)
Julian	24 May, AD 2026 (AM 7534)
Julian day	2461198
Korean	21 Baemdal, 4359 DE
Maya	13.0.13.11.15; 8 Zotz, 5 Men
Roman	ante diem IX Kalendas Iunias, MMDCCLXXIX AUC
Solar Hijri	16 Khordad, SH 1405
Tibetan	21 sa ga, me pho rta 2153 or 1772 or 1000

<<	June					>>
Su	Mo	Tu	We	Th	Fr	Sa
	1	2	3	4	5	6
7	8	9	10	11	12	13
14	15	16	17	18	19	20
21	22	23	24	25	26	27
28	29	30
2026

June 6 in recent years
2026 (Saturday)
2025 (Friday)
2024 (Thursday)
2023 (Tuesday)
2022 (Monday)
2021 (Sunday)
2020 (Saturday)
2019 (Thursday)
2018 (Wednesday)
2017 (Tuesday)

June 6 is the 157th day of the year (158th in leap years) in the Gregorian calendar; 208 days remain until the end of the year.

== Events ==
=== Pre-1600 ===
- 913 – Constantine VII, the eight-year-old illegitimate son of Leo VI the Wise, becomes nominal ruler of the Byzantine Empire under the regency of a seven-man council headed by Patriarch Nicholas Mystikos, appointed by Constantine's uncle Alexander on his deathbed.
- 1505 – The M8.2–8.8 Lo Mustang earthquake affects Tibet and Nepal, causing severe damage in Kathmandu and parts of the Indo-Gangetic plain.
- 1513 – War of the League of Cambrai: In the Battle of Novara, Swiss troops defeat the French under Louis II de la Trémoille, forcing them to abandon Milan; Duke Massimiliano Sforza is restored.
- 1523 – Swedish regent Gustav Vasa is elected King of Sweden and, marking a symbolic end to the Kalmar Union, 6 June is designated the country's national day.

=== 1601–1900 ===
- 1654 – Swedish Queen Christina abdicates her throne in favour of her cousin Charles Gustav and converts to Catholicism.
- 1674 – Shivaji is crowned as the first Chhatrapati of the Maratha Empire at Raigad Fort.
- 1762 – Seven Years' War: British forces begin the Siege of Havana and temporarily capture the city.
- 1813 – War of 1812: In the Battle of Stoney Creek, considered a critical turning point in the war, a British force of 700 under John Vincent defeats an American force twice its size under William Winder and John Chandler.
- 1822 – Alexis St Martin is accidentally shot in the stomach, leading to William Beaumont's studies on digestion.
- 1832 – The June Rebellion in Paris is put down by the National Guard.
- 1844 – The Young Men's Christian Association (YMCA) is founded in London.
- 1859 – Queensland is established as a separate colony from New South Wales. The date is still celebrated as Queensland Day.
- 1862 – American Civil War: The First Battle of Memphis, a naval engagement fought on the Mississippi River, results in the capture of Memphis, Tennessee by Union forces from the Confederates.
- 1882 – The Shewan forces of Menelik II of Ethiopia defeat the Gojjame army in the Battle of Embabo. The Shewans capture Negus Tekle Haymanot of Gojjam, and their victory leads to a Shewan hegemony over the territories south of the Abay River.
- 1889 – The Great Seattle Fire destroys all of downtown Seattle.
- 1892 – The Chicago "L" elevated rail system begins operation.
- 1894 – Governor Davis H. Waite orders the Colorado state militia to protect and support the miners engaged in the Cripple Creek miners' strike.

=== 1901–present ===
- 1912 – The eruption of Novarupta in Alaska begins. It is the largest volcanic eruption of the 20th century.
- 1917 – Paraguayan President Benigno Ferreira introduces the country's first labor law, establishing the workweek and weekend.
- 1918 – World War I: U.S. Marine Corps suffers its worst single day's casualties during the Battle of Belleau Wood while attempting to recapture the wood at Château-Thierry (the losses are exceeded at the Battle of Tarawa in November 1943).
- 1925 – The original Chrysler Corporation is founded by Walter Chrysler from the remains of the Maxwell Motor Company.
- 1933 – The first drive-in theater opens in Camden, New Jersey.
- 1934 – New Deal: U.S. President Franklin D. Roosevelt signs the Securities Exchange Act of 1934 into law, establishing the U.S. Securities and Exchange Commission.
- 1942 – World War II: The United States Navy's victory over the Imperial Japanese Navy at the Battle of Midway is a major turning point in the Pacific Theater. All four Japanese fleet carriers taking part—Akagi, Kaga, Sōryū and Hiryū—are sunk, as is the heavy cruiser Mikuma. The American carrier Yorktown and the destroyer Hammann are also sunk.
- 1944 – World War II: Commencement of Operation Overlord: The Allied invasion of Normandy begins with the execution of Operation Neptune—commonly referred to as D-Day—the largest seaborne invasion in history. Nearly 160,000 Allied troops cross the English Channel with about 5,000 landing and assault craft, 289 escort vessels, and 277 minesweepers participating. By the end of the day, the Allies have landed on five invasion beaches and are pushing inland.
- 1944 – World War II: Capture of the Caen canal and Orne river bridges by British paratroopers, also known as Operation Coup de Main (incorrectly referred to as Operation Deadstick.)
- 1966 – March Against Fear: African-American civil rights activist James Meredith is wounded in an ambush by white sniper James Aubrey Norvell. Meredith and Norvell are photographed by Jack R. Thornell, whose photo will receive the 1967 Pulitzer Prize in Photography, the last one to be awarded in the category.
- 1971 – Soyuz 11 is launched. The mission ends in disaster when all three cosmonauts, Georgy Dobrovolsky, Vladislav Volkov, and Viktor Patsayev are suffocated by uncontrolled decompression of the capsule during re-entry on 29 June.
- 1971 – Hughes Airwest Flight 706 collides with a McDonnell Douglas F-4 Phantom II of the United States Marine Corps over the San Gabriel Mountains, killing 50.
- 1975 – British referendum results in continued membership of the European Economic Community, with 67% of votes in favour.
- 1976 – Chief Minister of Sabah Faud Stephens, Peter Joinud Mojuntin, and several other politicians are killed in a plane crash near Kota Kinabalu International Airport in Malaysia.
- 1982 – 1982 Lebanon War: The war begins as forces under Israeli Defense Minister Ariel Sharon invade southern Lebanon during Operation Peace for the Galilee, eventually reaching as far north as the capital Beirut.
- 1985 – The grave of "Wolfgang Gerhard" is opened in Embu, Brazil; the exhumed remains are later proven to be those of Josef Mengele, Auschwitz's "Angel of Death"; Mengele is thought to have drowned while swimming in February 1979.
- 1992 – Copa Airlines Flight 201 breaks apart in mid-air and crashes into the Darién Gap in Panama, killing all 47 aboard.
- 1993 – Punsalmaagiin Ochirbat wins the first presidential election in Mongolia.
- 1994 – China Northwest Airlines Flight 2303 crashes near Xi'an Xianyang International Airport, killing all 160 people on board.
- 2002 – Eastern Mediterranean event. A near-Earth asteroid estimated at ten meters in diameter explodes over the Mediterranean Sea between Greece and Libya. The explosion is estimated to have a force of 26 kilotons, slightly more powerful than the Nagasaki atomic bomb.
- 2017 – Syrian civil war: The Battle of Raqqa begins with an offensive by the Syrian Democratic Forces (SDF) to capture the city from the Islamic State of Iraq and the Levant (ISIL).
- 2023 – Russo-Ukrainian war: The Kakhovka Dam is destroyed.
- 2024 – The launch of SpaceX Starship integrated flight test 4 (IFT-4)

== Births ==
=== Pre-1600 ===
- 1436 – Regiomontanus (Johannes Müller von Königsberg), German mathematician, astronomer, and bishop (died 1476)
- 1519 – Andrea Cesalpino, Italian philosopher, physician, and botanist (died 1603)
- 1599 – Diego Velázquez (date of baptism), Spanish painter and educator (died 1660)

=== 1601–1900 ===
- 1606 – Pierre Corneille, French playwright and producer (died 1684)
- 1622 – Claude-Jean Allouez, French-American missionary and explorer (died 1689)
- 1714 – Joseph I of Portugal, King of Portugal from 31 July 1750 until his death (died 1777)
- 1755 – Nathan Hale, American soldier (died 1776)
- 1756 – John Trumbull, American soldier and painter (died 1843)
- 1799 – Alexander Pushkin, Russian author and poet (died 1837)
- 1810 – Friedrich Wilhelm Schneidewin, German philologist and scholar (died 1856)
- 1825 – Friedrich Bayer, German pharmacist, founded Bayer (died 1880)
- 1841 – Eliza Orzeszkowa, Polish author and publisher (died 1910)
- 1843 – Henriette Wulfsberg, Norwegian school owner and writer (died 1906)
- 1850 – Karl Ferdinand Braun, German-American physicist and academic, Nobel Prize laureate in 1909 for physics (died 1918)
- 1851 – Angelo Moriondo, Italian inventor of the espresso machine (died 1914)
- 1857 – Aleksandr Lyapunov, Russian mathematician and physicist (died 1918)
- 1862 – Henry Newbolt, English historian, author, and poet (died 1938)
- 1867 – David T. Abercrombie, American entrepreneur and co-founder of lifestyle brand Abercrombie & Fitch (died 1931)
- 1868 – Robert Falcon Scott, English sailor and explorer (died 1912)
- 1872 – Alix of Hesse, German princess and Russian empress (died 1918)
- 1872 – Arthur Henry Adams, Australian journalist and author (died 1936)
- 1875 – Thomas Mann, German author and critic, Nobel Prize laureate (died 1955)
- 1890 – Ted Lewis, American singer, clarinet player, and bandleader (died 1971)
- 1891 – Masti Venkatesha Iyengar, Indian author and academic (died 1986)
- 1891 – Erich Marcks, German general in WWII who planned Operation Barbarossa (died 1944)
- 1896 – Henry Allingham, English World War I soldier and supercentenarian (died 2009)
- 1896 – Italo Balbo, Italian air marshal and fascist politician who played a key role in developing Mussolini's air force (died 1940)
- 1897 – Joel Rinne, Finnish actor (died 1981)
- 1898 – Jacobus Johannes Fouché, South African politician, 2nd State President of South Africa (died 1980)
- 1898 – Ninette de Valois, English ballerina, choreographer, and director (died 2001)
- 1900 – Manfred Sakel, Ukrainian-American psychiatrist and physician (died 1957)

=== 1901–present ===
- 1901 – Jan Struther, English author, poet and hymnwriter who created the character Mrs Miniver (died 1953)
- 1901 – Sukarno, Indonesian engineer and politician, 1st President of Indonesia (died 1970)
- 1902 – Jimmie Lunceford, American saxophonist and bandleader (died 1947)
- 1903 – Aram Khachaturian, Armenian composer and conductor (died 1978)
- 1906 – Max August Zorn, German mathematician and academic who is noted for Zorn's lemma (died 1993)
- 1907 – Bill Dickey, American baseball player and manager who played in eight World Series, winning seven (died 1993)
- 1909 – Isaiah Berlin, Latvian-English historian and philosopher (died 1997)
- 1915 – Vincent Persichetti, American pianist and composer (died 1987)
- 1916 – Hamani Diori, Nigerien academic and politician, 1st President of Niger (died 1989)
- 1917 – Kirk Kerkorian, American businessman, founded the Tracinda Corporation (died 2015)
- 1918 – Kenneth Connor, English comedy actor (died 1993)
- 1918 – Edwin G. Krebs, American biochemist and academic, Nobel Prize laureate (died 2009)
- 1919 – Peter Carington, 6th Baron Carrington, English army officer and politician, 6th Secretary General of NATO (died 2018)
- 1920 – Virginia Oliver (died 2026), American lobster fisherwoman
- 1923 – V. C. Andrews, American author, illustrator, and painter (died 1986)
- 1923 – Jean Pouliot, Canadian broadcaster (died 2004)
- 1925 – Maxine Kumin, American poet and author (died 2014)
- 1925 – Frank Chee Willeto, American soldier and politician, 4th Vice President of the Navajo Nation and a noted code talker during World War II (died 2013)
- 1926 – Klaus Tennstedt, German conductor (died 1998)
- 1929 – James Barnor, Ghanaian photographer
- 1929 – Sunil Dutt, Indian actor, director, producer, and politician (died 2005)
- 1930 – Frank Tyson, English-Australian cricketer, coach and journalist (died 2015)
- 1931 – Richard Hickock, American convicted murderer (died 1965)
- 1932 – David Scott, American colonel, engineer, and astronaut who was the commander of Apollo 15
- 1933 – Heinrich Rohrer, Swiss physicist and academic, Nobel Prize laureate (died 2013)
- 1934 – Albert II, King of the Belgians from 9 August 1993 to 21 July 2013 (abdicated)
- 1934 – Taichi Yamada, Japanese screenwriter and novelist (died 2023)
- 1935 – Jon Henricks, Australian swimmer; winner of two Olympic gold medals in 1956 (died 2026)
- 1935 – Grant Green, American jazz guitarist and composer (died 1979)
- 1936 – D. Ramanaidu, Indian actor, director, and producer, founded Suresh Productions (died 2015)
- 1936 – Levi Stubbs, American soul singer; lead vocalist of the Four Tops (died 2008)
- 1939 – Louis Andriessen, Dutch pianist and composer (died 2021)
- 1939 – Gary U.S. Bonds, American singer-songwriter
- 1939 – Marian Wright Edelman, American child rights activist
- 1939 – Eddie Giacomin, Canadian Hockey goaltender
- 1940 – Willie John McBride, Northern Irish rugby player who toured with the British Lions five times
- 1941 – Alexander Cockburn, Scottish-born American journalist (died 2012)
- 1943 – Richard Smalley, American chemist and academic, Nobel Prize laureate in 1996 for chemistry (died 2005)
- 1944 – Monty Alexander, Jamaican jazz pianist
- 1944 – Phillip Allen Sharp, American molecular biologist; 1993 Nobel Prize laureate (Physiology or Medicine)
- 1944 – Tommie Smith, American sprinter and football player; winner of 1968 Olympic 200m gold medal in a world record time
- 1946 – Tony Levin, American bass player and songwriter
- 1947 – David Blunkett, British Labour politician; Home Secretary 2001–2004
- 1947 – Robert Englund, American actor; best known for Nightmare on Elm Street
- 1947 – Ada Kok, Dutch butterfly stroke swimmer; winner of three Olympic medals including gold in 1968
- 1947 – Keith Daniel Williams, American convicted rapist and triple murderer (died 1996)
- 1948 – Arlene Harris, American entrepreneur, inventor, investor and policy advocate
- 1949 – Holly Near, American folk singer and songwriter
- 1951 – Khuraman Gasimova, Azerbaijani opera singer
- 1951 – Dwight Twilley, American pop/rock singer and songwriter (died 2023)
- 1952 – Harvey Fierstein, American actor and playwright; winner of four Tony Awards
- 1954 – Władysław Żmuda, Polish footballer and manager; 91 caps for Poland and voted Best Young Player at the 1974 FIFA World Cup
- 1955 – Sam Simon, American director, producer and screenwriter; co-developer of The Simpsons (died 2015)
- 1955 – Sandra Bernhard, American stand-up comic and actress
- 1955 – Lee Smolin, American theoretical physicist
- 1956 – Björn Borg, Swedish tennis player; winner of eleven Grand Slam singles titles including five consecutive Wimbledons
- 1959 – Colin Quinn, American comedian and actor
- 1960 – Steve Vai, American musician
- 1960 – Raudin Anwar, Indonesian diplomat
- 1962 – Hirokazu Kore-eda, Japanese director
- 1963 – Jason Isaacs, English actor
- 1966 – Sophie Jamal, Canadian endocrinologist involved in scientific misconduct
- 1966 – Tony Yeboah, Ghanaian footballer
- 1967 – Paul Giamatti, American actor and producer
- 1972 – Natalie Morales, American television journalist and NBC News anchor
- 1973 – Jackie Arklöv, Swedish mercenary and convicted murderer
- 1974 – Uncle Kracker, American musician
- 1974 – Sonya Walger, British-American actress
- 1977 – David Connolly, Irish footballer
- 1978 – Mirko Šarić, Argentine footballer (died 2000)
- 1979 – Roberto De Zerbi, Italian football manager
- 1980 – Pete Hegseth, American author, political commentator and 29th United States Secretary of Defense
- 1983 – Michael Krohn-Dehli, Danish footballer
- 1985 – Sebastian Larsson, Swedish footballer
- 1985 – Drew McIntyre, Scottish professional wrestler
- 1985 – Becky Sauerbrunn, American footballer; twice a winner of the FIFA Women's World Cup, also an Olympic gold medallist
- 1986 – Gin Wigmore, New Zealand singer and songwriter
- 1988 – Anthony Pilkington, Irish footballer
- 1989 – Jeanna Giese, American rabies survivor
- 1990 – Gavin Hoyte, English born footballer who represented Trinidad and Tobago
- 1990 – Anthony Rendon, American baseball player
- 1990 – Pape Souaré, Senegalese footballer
- 1992 – DeAndre Hopkins, American football player
- 1993 – Vic Mensa, American rapper and singer
- 1994 – Yvon Mvogo, Swiss footballer
- 1995 – Julian Green, American soccer player
- 1996 – Jack Hetherington, Australian rugby league player
- 1998 – Kenny Pickett, American football player
- 2000 – Haechan, South Korean singer
- 2001 – Rayan Aït-Nouri, French-Algerian footballer

== Deaths ==
=== Pre-1600 ===
- 184 – Qiao Xuan, Chinese official (born c. 110)
- 863 – Abu Musa Utamish, vizier to the Abbasid Caliphate
- 913 – Alexander III, Byzantine emperor (born 870)
- 1097 – Agnes of Aquitaine, Queen of Aragon and Navarre
- 1134 – Norbert of Xanten, German bishop and saint (born 1060)
- 1217 – Henry I, King of Castile and Toledo (born 1204)
- 1251 – William III of Dampierre, Count of Flanders
- 1252 – Robert Passelewe, Bishop of Chichester
- 1480 – Vecchietta, Italian painter, sculptor, and architect (born 1412)
- 1548 – João de Castro, Portuguese soldier and politician, Governor of Portuguese India (born 1500)
- 1583 – Nakagawa Kiyohide, Japanese daimyo (born 1556)

=== 1601–1900 ===
- 1661 – Martino Martini, Italian Jesuit missionary (born 1614)
- 1799 – Patrick Henry, American lawyer and politician, 1st Governor of Virginia (born 1736)
- 1813 – Antonio Cachia, Maltese architect, engineer and archaeologist (born 1739)
- 1832 – Jeremy Bentham, English jurist and philosopher (born 1748)
- 1861 – Camillo Benso, Count of Cavour, Italian politician, 1st Prime Minister of Italy (born 1810)
- 1865 – William Quantrill, American Confederate guerrilla band leader (born 1837)
- 1878 – Robert Stirling, Scottish minister and engineer, invented the stirling engine (born 1790)
- 1881 – Henri Vieuxtemps, Belgian violinist and composer (born 1820)
- 1891 – John A. Macdonald, Scottish-Canadian lawyer and politician, 1st Prime Minister of Canada (born 1815)

=== 1901–present ===
- 1916 – Yuan Shikai, Chinese general and politician, 2nd President of the Republic of China (born 1859)
- 1922 – Lillian Russell, American actress and singer (born 1860)
- 1935 – Julian Byng, 1st Viscount Byng of Vimy, English field marshal and politician, 12th Governor General of Canada (born 1862)
- 1939 – Constantin Noe, Megleno-Romanian editor and professor (born 1883)
- 1941 – Louis Chevrolet, American race car driver and businessman, founded Chevrolet and Frontenac Motor Corporation (born 1878)
- 1946 – Gerhart Hauptmann, German novelist, poet, and playwright, Nobel Prize laureate (born 1862)
- 1947 – James Agate, English author and critic (born 1877)
- 1948 – Louis Lumière, French film director, producer, and screenwriter (born 1864)
- 1955 – Max Meldrum, Scottish-Australian painter and educator (born 1875)
- 1961 – Carl Gustav Jung, Swiss psychiatrist and psychotherapist (born 1875)
- 1962 – Yves Klein, French painter (born 1928)
- 1962 – Tom Phillis, Australian motorcycle racer (born 1934)
- 1963 – William Baziotes, American painter and academic (born 1912)
- 1968 – Robert F. Kennedy, American soldier, lawyer, and politician, 64th United States Attorney General (assassinated) (born 1925)
- 1976 – J. Paul Getty, American businessman, founded the Getty Oil Company (born 1892)
- 1979 – Jack Haley, American actor (born 1897)
- 1982 – Kenneth Rexroth, American poet and academic (born 1905)
- 1983 – Hans Leip, German author, poet, and playwright who wrote the lyrics of Lili Marleen (born 1893)
- 1991 – Stan Getz, American saxophonist and jazz innovator (born 1927)
- 1994 – Mark McManus, Scottish actor (born 1935)
- 1994 – Barry Sullivan, American film actor (born 1912)
- 1996 – George Davis Snell, American geneticist and immunologist; awarded the Nobel Prize in Physiology or Medicine in 1980 for his studies of histocompatibility (born 1903)
- 2005 – Anne Bancroft, American film actress; winner of the 1963 Academy Award for Best Actress for The Miracle Worker (born 1931)
- 2006 – Billy Preston, American singer-songwriter, pianist, and actor (born 1946)
- 2009 – Jean Dausset, French-Spanish immunologist and academic; awarded the 1980 Nobel Prize in Physiology or Medicine for his studies of the genetic basis of immunological reaction (born 1916)
- 2012 – Vladimir Krutov, Russian ice hockey player; together with Igor Larionov and Sergei Makarov, formed the famed KLM Line. (born 1960)
- 2013 – Jerome Karle, American crystallographer and academic; awarded the 1985 Nobel Prize in Chemistry for research into the molecular structure of chemical compounds (born 1918)
- 2013 – Esther Williams, American swimmer and actress (born 1921)
- 2014 – Lorna Wing, English psychiatrist and physician; pioneered studies of autism (born 1928)
- 2015 – Vincent Bugliosi, American lawyer and author; prosecuting attorney in the Tate–LaBianca murders case (born 1934)
- 2015 – Ludvík Vaculík, Czech journalist and author; noted for The Two Thousand Words which inspired the Prague Spring (born 1926)
- 2016 – Viktor Korchnoi, Russian chess grandmaster; arguably the best player never to become World Chess Champion (born 1931)
- 2016 – Peter Shaffer, English playwright and screenwriter; works included Equus and Amadeus (born 1926)

== Holidays and observances ==
- Christian feast day:
  - Bessarion of Egypt
  - Claudius of Besançon
  - Iarlaithe mac Loga
  - Ini Kopuria (Anglican Church of Melanesia, Church of England, Episcopal Church)
  - Blessed Innocent Guz
  - Marcellin Champagnat
  - Blessed Maria Laura Mainetti
  - Rafael Guízar y Valencia
  - Norbert
  - June 6 (Eastern Orthodox liturgics)
- D-Day Invasion Anniversary
- Engineer's Day in Taiwan
- Korean Children's Union Foundation Day in North Korea
- Memorial Day in South Korea
- National Day of Sweden, marking the end of the Kalmar Union and the coronation of King Gustav Vasa
- National Huntington's Disease Awareness Day in the United States
- Queensland Day
- UN Russian Language Day
