= 2001–2002 India–Pakistan standoff =

Period of military and political tension between India and Pakistan

2001–2002 India–Pakistan standoff Indian Codename: Operation Parakram
- Part of the Indo-Pakistani wars and conflicts
Date	13 December 2001 – 10 June 2002 (5 months and 4 weeks)
Location	Indo-Pakistani border

Belligerents
India	Pakistan

Commanders and leaders
Atal Bihari Vajpayee; L. K. Advani; S. Padmanabhan	Pervez Musharraf

Strength
500,000–800,000 soldiers	300,000–400,000 soldiers

Casualties and losses
798 killed 1,874 casualties altogether (per Indian government) 900 casualties (per Arun Prakash); 1,295 civilian casualties between 2001–2005 in mine-related incidents (per an Indian NGO survey)	Unknown
- 155,000 Indians and 44,000 Pakistanis displaced (per The News International)

The 2001–2002 India–Pakistan standoff was a military standoff between India and Pakistan that resulted in the massing of troops on both sides of the border and along the Line of Control (LoC) in the region of Kashmir. This was the second major military standoff between India and Pakistan following the successful detonation of nuclear devices by both countries in 1998, after the Kargil War of 1999.

The military buildup was initiated by India responding to a terrorist attack on the Indian Parliament in New Delhi on 13 December 2001 (during which twelve people, including the five terrorists who attacked the building, were killed) and the Jammu and Kashmir Legislative Assembly on 1 October 2001 in which 38 people were killed. India claimed that the attacks were carried out by two Pakistan-based terror groups fighting in Indian-administered Kashmir—Lashkar-e-Taiba and Jaish-e-Mohammed, both of whom India has said are backed by Pakistan's ISI–a charge that Pakistan has denied. Farooq Abdullah, the then chief minister of Jammu and Kashmir state urged India to launch a war against militant training camps across the border in Pakistan.

In Western media, coverage of the standoff focused on the possibility of a nuclear war between the two countries and the implications of the potential conflict on the American-led "Global War on Terrorism" in nearby Afghanistan. Tensions de-escalated following international diplomatic mediation which resulted in the October 2002 withdrawal of Indian and Pakistani troops from the international border.

The Indian codename for the military mobilization was Operation Parakram, which has been characterized by Sanjay Ahirwal of NDTV as a manifestation of India's "resolve to have an eyeball to eyeball confrontation" with Pakistan, and also an operation which led to attainment of some of its military and political objectives.

Towards the end of the protracted military standoff, in a surreptitious operation, India's Jat Regiment occupied a strategically important mountain peak on the Pakistani side of the LoC near Dras, Point 5070, and subsequently rechristened it Balwan. This had implications for the Pakistani army, which was accustomed to occupying the peak during summer, as the peak gave India a vantage view of Gultari valley which sustained Pakistani posts in Dras. In consequence, the Pakistani army dispensed its entire chain of command, including the Pakistani Brigade Commander and GOC of the Northern Areas over the loss of this peak, while their Indian counterpart Lt. Gen. Deepak Summanwar was felicitated with an Uttam Yudh Seva Medal as a recognition of India's complete domination of the boundary area near Dras.

== Prelude ==
On the morning of 13 December 2001, a cell of five armed men attacked the Parliament of India by breaching the security cordon at Gate 12. The five men killed seven people before being shot dead by the Indian Security Forces.

World leaders and leaders in nearby countries strongly condemned the attack on the parliament, including Pakistan. On 14 December, the ruling Indian National Democratic Alliance blamed Pakistan-based Lashkar-e-Taiba (LeT) and Jaish-e-Mohammed (JeM) for the attack. Indian Home Minister L.K. Advani claimed, "we have received some clues about yesterday's incident, which shows that a neighboring country, and some terrorist organizations active there are behind it", in an indirect reference to Pakistan and Pakistan-based militant groups. The same day, in a démarche to Pakistan's High Commissioner to India, Ashraf Jehangir Qazi, India demanded that Pakistan stop the activities of LeT and JeM, apprehend the organisation's leaders and their access to all financial assets. Following the Indian Government's statements, Pakistan put its military into full combat readiness the same day.

The spokesman for the Pakistani military's public media wing (ISPR), Major-General Rashid Qureshi, said that the attack on the Indian parliament was a result of India's efforts to start a conflict with Pakistan, claiming that "Those [Indians] who can kill thousands of defenseless people in Kashmir can resort to such tactics to gain international sympathy. We demand the international community probe this attack independently to know the truth." while another senior official maintained that India's failure to solve internal problems have caused them to blame Pakistan for everything without cause, stating "Why have the Indians rejected the U.S. government’s offer to send an FBI team to investigate the attack on the parliament?"

On 20 December, amid calls from the United States, Russia, and United Nations to exercise restraint, India mobilised and deployed its troops to Kashmir and Indian Punjab in what was India's largest military mobilisation since the 1971 conflict. The Indian codename for the mobilisation was Operation Parakram.

== January offensive ==
=== Planning ===
The troop deployment to India's western border was expected to take three to four weeks, accordingly, the military action involving a limited offensive against the terrorists' training camps in Pak administered Kashmir was planned by the Indian Cabinet Committee on Security for the second week of January 2002. It would start with an airstrike by the Indian Air Force's Tiger Squadron to attack zones with a large concentration of camps. Special forces of the Indian Army would then launch a limited ground offensive to further neutralize the terrorist camps and help to occupy the dominant positions on the LoC. 14 January 2002, was decided as the tentative D-day.

According to the Indian strategy, a limited strike in the Pakistan administered Kashmir was preferred as it would convey the Indian resolve to Pakistan and yet keep the international retribution levels that are manageable. Indian actions would then be comparable to the ongoing US offensive in Afghanistan against Osama bin Laden's Al-Qaeda terrorists.

The CCS had weighed in the possibility of Pakistan launching an all-out offensive as a response to the Indian strikes. The intelligence assessment suggested that the Pakistani Army was not well prepared. This further minimized the chances of Pakistan launching a full-scale war. The Indian plans were strengthened by a strong economy with low inflation, high petroleum, and forex reserves. Finance minister Yashwant Sinha announced that the Indian economy was prepared for war, in spite of being the final option. The limited strike served as a tactical option. The troop build-up signaled "India's seriousness" to the international community. If Pakistan's strategy did not change then India would have no other option.

=== Military confrontations ===
In late December, both countries moved ballistic missiles closer to each other's border, and mortar and artillery fire was reported in Kashmir. By January 2002, India had mobilized around 500,000 troops and three armored divisions on Pakistan's border, concentrated along the Line of Control in Kashmir. Pakistan responded similarly, deploying around 300,000 troops to that region. The tensions were partially defused after Musharraf's speech on 12 January promising action on terror emanating from Pakistan.

Artillery duels were commonplace during the protracted military confrontations. In one such instance, well over 40 Pakistani soldiers perished on Point 5353 near Dras when Indian troops from nearby Point 5165, Point 5240 and Point 5100 commenced artillery fire on the Pakistani post, rendering the Pakistanis unable to reinforce their troops.

=== Diplomacy ===
India initiated its diplomatic offensive by recalling Indian high commissioner and the civilian flights from Pakistan were banned.

Pakistan picked up the war signals and began mobilization of its military and initiated diplomatic talks with US president George W. Bush. American Secretary of State Colin Powell engaged with India and Pakistan to reduce tensions. In the first week of January, British prime minister Tony Blair visited India with a message that he was pressurizing Pakistani president Musharraf. The US declared LeT and JeM as foreign terrorist groups.

=== Musharraf's speech ===
On 8 January 2002, Indian Home Minister L. K. Advani visited the US, where he was informed about the contents of the upcoming landmark speech by Musharraf. On 12 January 2002, President Pervez Musharraf gave a speech intended to reduce tensions with India. He for the first time condemned the attack on Parliament as a terrorist attack and compared it with the 11 September attacks. He declared in his speech that terrorism was unjustified in the name of Kashmir and Pakistan would combat extremism on its own soil. Pakistan would resolve Kashmir with dialogue and no organization will be allowed to carry out terrorism under the pretext of Kashmir. As demanded by India, he also announced plans for the regulation of madrasas and banning the known terrorist groups that were operating out of Pakistan. He announced a formal ban on five jihadi organizations, that included Jaish-e-Mohammed and Lashkar-e-Taiba engaged in militancy in Kashmir.

=== Indian decision ===
The Indian prime minister Atal B. Vajpayee though skeptic of the seriousness of Musharraf's pledges, decided not to carry out the military attack planned for 14 January.

== Kaluchak massacre ==
Tensions escalated significantly in May 2002. On 14 May, three suicidal terrorists attacked an army camp at Kaluchak near Jammu and killed 34 people and injured fifty more before getting killed, most of the victims were the wives and children of Indian soldiers serving in Kashmir. The terrorist incident again revived the chance of a full-blown war.

On 15 May, PM Vajpayee was quoted in the Indian Parliament saying "Hamein pratikar karna hoga (We will have to counter it)." American Deputy Secretary of State, Richard Armitage, quoted the incident as a trigger for further deterioration of the situation.

The Indian Cabinet had little belief that diplomatic pressure could stop Pakistan's support for the militants in Kashmir. India accused Pakistan that it was failing to keep its promise on ending the cross-border terrorism. Musharraf's follow-up to his speech on 12 January was observed by India as weak and disingenuous. Pakistan did not extradite the terrorist leaders demanded by India, and Lashkar was allowed to continue its operations in Pakistan as a charity with a new name. During the spring, jihadi militants started crossing the Line of Control again.

== June Offensive ==
=== Planning ===
On 18 May, Vajpayee reviewed preparedness with Defence Minister Fernandes, the Director-General Military Operations and the military intelligence chief. The CCS met and favored taking military action against terrorists in Pakistan. A similar limited military action to the one planned in January was not considered viable, as Pakistan had strengthened its forces on the LoC. Any action confined to Pakistan-administered Kashmir would yield only marginal military gains. The Indian military favored an offensive along the Indo-Pak border that would stretch Pakistani troops thin and provide India access to Pakistan-administered Kashmir.

The Indian armed forces accordingly prepared the plan to target the war-waging capabilities of Pakistan and destroy the terrorist camps. The battle canvas planned for June was larger than the one planned in January. The Indian Air Force along with the 1 Strike Corps of India would initiate an attack in Shakargarh bulge to engage Pakistan's Army Reserve North (ARN) that was spread from Muzaffarabad to Lahore. This would engage Pakistan's key strike corp while Indian strike formations from Eastern Command would carry out the offensive at the Line of Control and capture the strategic positions used by the terrorists for infiltrations. The period considered was between 23 May and 10 June.

=== Military confrontations ===
During the end of May 2002, the Indian and Pakistani armed forces continued to be fully mobilized. The tenor of statements published in the Indian press and intelligence information collected, pointed to an imminent invasion by India. An SOS sent to Israel by the Indian Defence Ministry for defense supplies during the month of June confirmed the intelligence.

On 18 May, India expelled the Pakistani High Commissioner. That same day, thousands of villagers had to flee Pakistani artillery fire in Jammu. On 21 May, clashes killed six Pakistani soldiers and 1 Indian soldier, as well as civilians from both sides. On 22 May, Indian Prime Minister Vajpayee announced to his troops to prepare for a "decisive battle".

Between 25 and 28 May, Pakistan conducted 3 missile tests. India reviewed its nuclear capability to strike back. On 7 June the Indian Air Force lost an unmanned aerial vehicle near Lahore, which Pakistan claimed to have shot down.

=== Threat of nuclear war ===
As both India and Pakistan are armed with nuclear weapons, the possibility a conventional war could escalate into a nuclear one was raised several times during the standoff. Various statements on this subject were made by Indian and Pakistani officials during the conflict, mainly concerning a no first use policy. Indian External Affairs Minister Jaswant Singh said on 5 June that India would not use nuclear weapons first, while Musharraf said on 5 June he would not renounce Pakistan's right to use nuclear weapons first. There was also concern that a 6 June 2002 asteroid explosion over Earth, known as the Eastern Mediterranean Event, could have caused a nuclear conflict had it exploded over India or Pakistan.

=== Diplomacy ===
Vajpayee contacted the leaders of the global community including Bush, Blair, Russian president Vladimir Putin and French president Jacques Chirac and informed them Musharraf could not deliver on his 12 January speech and the patience of the country was running out. In the diplomacy that followed, Bush, Putin, Blair and Japanese prime minister Junichiro Koizumi requested Vajpayee to avoid taking the extreme step. The global community informed India that it would negotiate with Musharraf to clarify his position on stopping the cross-border infiltration.

Attempts to defuse the situation continued. The Russian president Vladimir Putin tried to mediate a solution, but in vain.

Restraint was urged by the global community as there were fears that Pakistan would proceed to use its nuclear weapons in the face to counter its conventional asymmetry as compared to the Indian armed forces. In April, in an interview to German magazine Der Spiegel Musharraf had already hinted that he was willing to use nukes against India. Pakistan's nuclear threats led to US Secretary of State Powell contacting Musharraf at five occasions in the last week of May and reading the riot act.

On 5 June 2002, American Deputy Secretary of State Richard Armitage visited Pakistan. He asked Musharraf if he would "permanently" end cross-border infiltration and help to dismantle the infrastructure used for terrorism. On 6 June 2002, Musharraf 's commitment was conveyed to Powell, and to India after his arrival. On 10 June 2002, Powell announced Musharraf's promise to the global community, after which India called off its strike plans.

A full-frontal invasion would have translated into war. Political logic implied it was better to give another chance to Musharraf. The military build-up on the border by India in January and June had forced both the international community and Pakistan into action.

== July–August strikes ==
On 29 July 2002 for the first time after the end of the Kargil war, India used air power to attack positions held by the Pakistani forces at Loonda Post on the Indian side of the Line of Control in the Machil sector. Eight IAF Mirage 2000 H aircraft dropped precision-guided bombs weighing 1,000-pounds to destroy four bunkers that were occupied by Pakistan. The forward trenches prepared by Indian troops in earlier years were also occupied by the Pakistani forces and 155-millimetre Bofors howitzers were used to hit them. According to Indian military intelligence officials, at least 28 Pakistani soldiers were killed in the fighting. The air assault was conducted in daylight and to demonstrate India's willingness to escalate the conflict in response to provocations.

Towards the end of the protracted military standoff, in a surreptitious operation, India's Jat Regiment occupied a strategically important mountain peak on the Pakistani side of the LoC near Dras, Point 5070, and subsequently rechristened it Balwan. This had implications for the Pakistani army, which was accustomed to occupying the peak during summer, as the peak gave India a vantage view of the Gultari valley, which sustained Pakistani posts in Dras. In consequence, the Pakistani army dispensed its entire chain of command, including the Pakistani Brigade Commander and GOC of the Northern Areas, over the loss of this peak, while their Indian counterpart Lt. Gen. Deepak Summanwar was felicitated with an Uttam Yudh Seva Medal as a recognition of India's domination of the boundary area near Dras.

Pakistani army troops stationed near the post in the Kupwara sector's Kel area of the LoC had been shelling the Indian positions across the LoC. India suspected a troop build-up situation near the border post that was similar to Kargil. Indian army planned retaliation by sending troops to attack the Pakistani posts. The initial ground attack to retake the post failed, with the Indian army suffering 11 casualties. Later on, after deliberations with the then Army Chief, General Sundararajan Padmanabhan, the plan was modified and instead of only a ground assault, the decision was made to first attack Pakistani positions using the IAF jets followed by a ground assault by the Indian Special Forces. At 1:30 pm on 2 August, IAF's LGB capable Mirage 2000 H fighter aircraft loaded with laser-guided weapons bombed the Pakistani bunkers located in the Kel. The attack destroyed the bunkers with an unknown number of casualties.

== Easing of tension ==
While tensions remained high throughout the next few months, both governments began easing the situation in Kashmir. By October 2002, India had begun to demobilise their troops along her border and later Pakistan did the same, and in November 2003 a cease-fire between the two nations was signed.

== Casualties ==
The Indian casualties were up to 1,874, including 798 fatal. Pakistani casualties were not divulged.

== Cost of standoff ==
The Indian cost for the buildup was $3 billion to $4 billion while Pakistan's was $1.4 billion. The standoff led to a total of 155,000 Indians and 45,000 Pakistanis displaced, per Pakistani media estimates.

One of the reasons for the failure of Operation Parakram is described to be the slow mobilisation of 500,000 troops. It took nearly three weeks for India to completely move 500,000 troops, 3 armoured divisions, and other supporting units to the border. The delay allowed Pakistan to move its own 300,000 troops along with the supporting units to the border. Lacking strategic surprise, Indian military decided to withdraw its troops.

On 5 November 2011, former Indian naval chief, Admiral Sushil Kumar, claimed that operation Parakram lacked clear objectives. He described the operation as a "punishing mistake" for India. Moreover, he said that Operation Parakram, may in fact have encouraged both Pakistan and China to increase cross-border violations. Had India tried a similar operation against China, it would have been a fatal blunder for India.

== See also ==
- Indo-Pakistani wars and conflicts
- 2002 Eastern Mediterranean event
- India-Pakistan relations
- Kaluchak Incident
