= H. S. Panag =

Indian army general

Lieutenant General H S Panag PVSM, AVSM, ADC
- Born: 4 December 1948 (age 77); Mahadian, East Punjab, India
- Relatives: Gul Panag (Daughter) Sherbir Panag (Son)
- Military career
- Allegiance: India
- Branch: Indian Army
- Service years: 1969–2008
- Rank: Lieutenant General
- Unit: 1 MECH INF
- Commands: Central Army; Northern Army; XXI Corps; 31 Armoured Division; 192 Mountain Brigade; 43 Armoured Brigade; 1 Mech Inf
- Awards: Param Vishisht Seva Medal; Ati Vishisht Seva Medal

Harcharanjit Singh Panag, PVSM, AVSM is a retired lieutenant general of the Indian Army. He is presently a defence analyst and commentator on strategic affairs. A proponent of use of robotics by Indian armed forces he is very active on social media.

== Personal life and family ==
Panag was born on 4 December 1948 in a Jatt Sikh family at Mahadian village, Fatehgarh Sahib district, in the Indian state of Punjab. His father, Colonel Shamsher Singh was a distinguished personality known for taking social initiatives in the field of development, education, ex-servicemen issues, gender equality and child rights. He was elected unopposed as the Sarpanch of his village for 20 years. Panag has two children, a daughter and a son. His daughter, Gul Panag, is a Bollywood actress and social activist. His son, Sherbir Panag is the founder of the Law Offices of Panag & Babu, a boutique financial crime specialist law firm. Sherbir is a top ranked lawyer for white collar crime in the Asia Pacific and is a senior fellow at the Wharton School's Zicklin Centre for business ethics. He has a sister, Ms. Gurdeepak Kaur, a social activist who joined AAP. His brother, also an army man, Major General Charanjit Singh Panag (retired) has various publications to his credit.

== Military career ==
Panag was commissioned into the 4th Battalion of the Sikh Regiment on 21 December 1969. He subsequently served in the 5th Battalion of the 5th Gorkha Rifles (FF) and the 9th Battalion of the Mechanised Infantry Regiment, finally going on to command the 1st Battalion of the Mechanised Infantry. He is an alumnus of the National Defence Academy, Khadakwasla, Indian Military Academy, Dehradun, Defence Services Staff College, Wellington, Army War College, Mhow and the National Defence College, New Delhi. He has authored several publications concerning Indian defence forces and national security.

Panag is experienced in both counter-insurgency and high-altitude operations. He also saw action in various wars and military operations. During his career he has served in various positions:

- Instructor in the Indian Military Officers Training Academy.
- Commanded an Infantry brigade.
- Commanded the 31 Armoured Division.
- Commanded XXI Corps, the strike formation of Southern Command.
- GOC-in-C of the army's Northern Command, Udhampur.
- GOC-in-C of the army's Central Command, Lucknow.

Panag also held the post of Additional Director General (Perspective Planning) at the Army HQ. He retired as a lieutenant general on 31 December 2008. He was appointed an Administrative Member of the Armed Forces Tribunal, Chandigarh Bench in June 2009 after retiring from the army. An upright officer he initiated as many as 120 Courts of Inquiry on corruption charges, soon after he took charge of Northern Command in 2007, after which he was transferred to Central Command in early 2008.

Panag made the 1st arrest of PoW even before the start of Bangladesh War when he arrested Flt. Lt Pervaiz Mehdi Qureshi who later became ACM of PAF.

As Brigade Commander Panag, in April 2000, oversaw a military operation on the Chorbat la sector to capture Point 5310 across LoC as well as another operation to capture 3 more features across the Yaldor sector.

Panag along with Lt. Gen. Rustom K. Nanavatty devised a military operation codenamed 'Operation Kabaddi' in mid-2001 to capture 25–30 Pakistan army posts from Batalik in Ladakh to Chamb-Jaurian in Jammu sector on the LoC. The plan was to execute the operation in October 2001, but could not be carried out due to changed geopolitical scenarios after September 11 Attacks.

== Politics ==
Panag became a member of the Aam Aadmi Party (AAP) in January 2014 after retiring from the Armed Forces Tribunal. He campaigned for his actress daughter, Gul Panag in the 2014 Lok Sabha election in Chandigarh which she lost to another actress Kiran Kher.

== Honours and awards ==
Panag won the following awards during his career:

- Param Vishisht Seva Medal
- Ati Vishisht Seva Medal

=== Military awards ===

Param Vishisht Seva Medal	Ati Vishist Seva Medal		Poorvi Star
Special Service Medal	Sangram Medal	Operation Vijay Medal	Operation Parakram Medal
Sainya Seva Medal	High Altitude Service Medal	Videsh Seva Medal	50th Anniversary of Independence Medal
25th Anniversary of Independence Medal	30 Years Long Service Medal	20 Years Long Service Medal	9 Years Long Service Medal

Military offices
Preceded by Lt Gen O P Nandrajog	General Officer-Commanding-in-Chief Central Command; 2008–2008	Succeeded by Lt Gen J K Mohanty
Preceded by Lt Gen Deepak Kapoor	General Officer-Commanding-in-Chief Northern Command; 2006–2008	Succeeded by Lt Gen P C Bhardwaj
