= Point 5240 =

Mountain peak on the Line of Control in Kashmir

- Point 5245

Highest point
- Elevation: 5,240 m (17,190 ft)

Geography
- Location: Line of Control, Ladakh, Kashmir
- Parent range: Himalayas

Point 5240 (also called Point 5245) is a mountain peak situated on the Line of Control, the de facto border dividing the Indian- and Pakistani-administered portions of Ladakh in the Dras sector of Kargil district. It lies southeast of Point 5353, at the end of the ridgeline, on the LoC, coming from Point 5105, one kilometre east of a feature known as Rocky Knob, about 800 metres away from the base of Point 5140.

Following the end of the Kargil War, the Indian and Pakistani local military commanders agreed to a plan to vacate Point 5240, along with two other mountains nearby — namely, Point 5353 and Point 5165 — all on the LoC. However, in late October 1999, units of 8 Mountain Division of the Indian Army captured Point 5240. They subsequently captured Point 5165 as well apparently to forestall their capture by Pakistanis. Thus, Point 5240 continues to be under Indian control.

Point 5240 provides "good" observation of the Pakistani supply route for Point 5353, according to the Indian defence ministry.
