= Point 5353 =

Mountain peak situated on the Line of Control in Kashmir

- Location within Gilgit Baltistan Location within Ladakh

Highest point
- Elevation: 5,353 m (17,562 ft)
- Coordinates: 34.52567°N 75.69866°E

Geography
- Location: Line of Control, Kashmir
- Countries: Pakistan and India
- States: Gilgit-Baltistan and Ladakh
- Regions: Skardu District and Kargil district
- Parent range: Himalayas

Point 5353 (also called Point 17561, and Marpo La Peak) is a mountain peak on the Line of Control dividing the Indian- and Pakistani-administered portions of Kashmir in the vicinity of Dras in the Kargil district. It is the highest peak along the Marpo La ridge and dominates the entire area on both the sides of the Line of Control.

The peak became a subject of controversy after the Kargil War. Soon after the war had ended The Hindu correspondent Praveen Swami and an Indian opposition party leader, Ram Kumar Anand claimed that the peak was inside the Indian side of the Line of Control (LoC) and it was captured by the Pakistan Army during the Kargil War. They also claimed that the Indian troops had unsuccessfully tried to recapture Point 5353 on 18 May 1999. The report also added that Indian troops captured Point 5310 on the Pakistani side of LoC in retaliation in April 2000.

The Pakistani military has held possession of Point 5353 from the time of the war, whereas the Indian Army has held the peaks in its surrounding on either side with a view to counteract any Pakistani activity on 5353.

== Geography ==
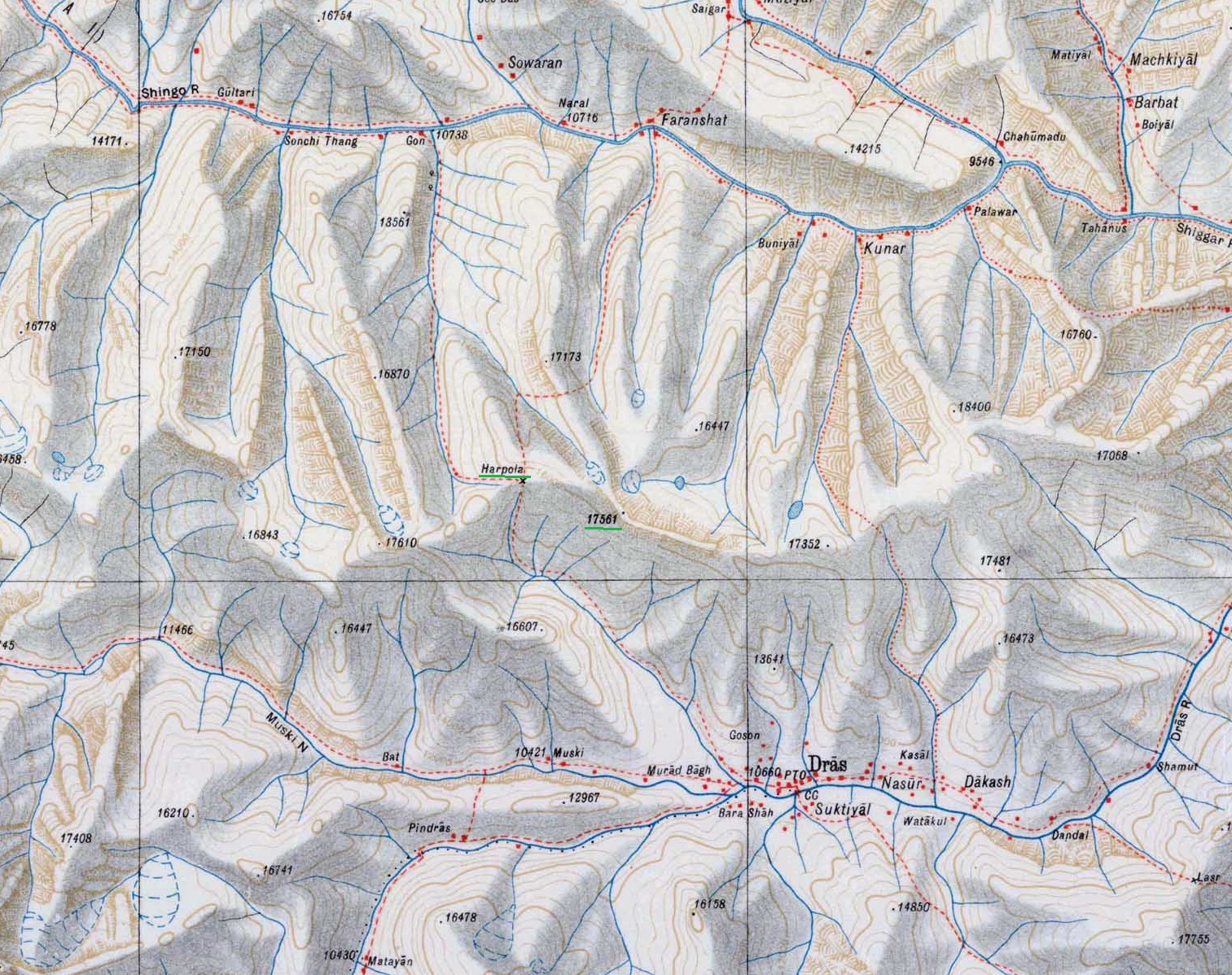
The Marpo La pass and the Gultari and Drass valleys (Survey of India, 1923); Point 17561 is to the right of Marpo La

The Marpo La pass is one of very few passes in the high Himalayas of Ladakh that allows north–south communication. (Note: Rammohun, Countering Insurgencies in India (2011, p. 190): "The Himalayan range extending beyond the Kaobal Gali is steep and virtually impassable except for two passes across which these are old trails, one at Marpo La and the other at Chor Bat La.") The 1949 Cease-Fire Line between India and Pakistan as well as the 1972 Line of Control pass through the Marpo La pass. The ridge adjoining the pass to the east, which is also referred to as the 'Marpo La ridge', runs in a northwest-southeast axis and contains a number of tall peaks. The Point 5353, so named because of its height in metres, is the tallest peak on the Marpo La ridge. Its older name is Point 17561, representing its height in feet.

The Line of Control in this area is flanked by the Shingo River valley of Pakistani-administered Kashmir in the north and the Dras River valley of Indian-administered Kashmir in the south. Both these valleys represent major lines of east–west communication in the respective regions of Kashmir. The Shingo and Dras rivers join together further east near Kakshar. To the south of the Line of Control is India's Kargil district and to the north is Pakistan's Skardu district. A dominating feature in the area is Point 5608, which lies about 15 km to the east of Point 5353 in the Kaksar sector. It overlooks the Shingo Valley in Pakistan. Indian troops took control of this feature in the wake of Operation Parakram.

According to the Indian Army sources, the Point 5353 itself is on the Line of Control. However, after the end of the Kargil War, a controversy erupted in India as to which side of the Line of Control the peak lay.

Point 5070, 3 km west of Point 5353 is the closest peak to the Marpo La pass. The second tallest peak on the Marpo La ridge, Point 5240, is 1.2 km southeast of the Point 5353. Both points 5070 and 5240 are currently held by India, and are situated on the LoC. (Note: Gen. Ashok K. Mehta states that point 5240 is on the Line of Control.)

The Sando nullah (stream) starts just below the Marpo La pass and flows southeast, joining the Drass River. A track running alongside the Sando Nullah is the key communication link between the town of Dras and the Marpo La pass.

== Strategic significance, and the surrounding area ==
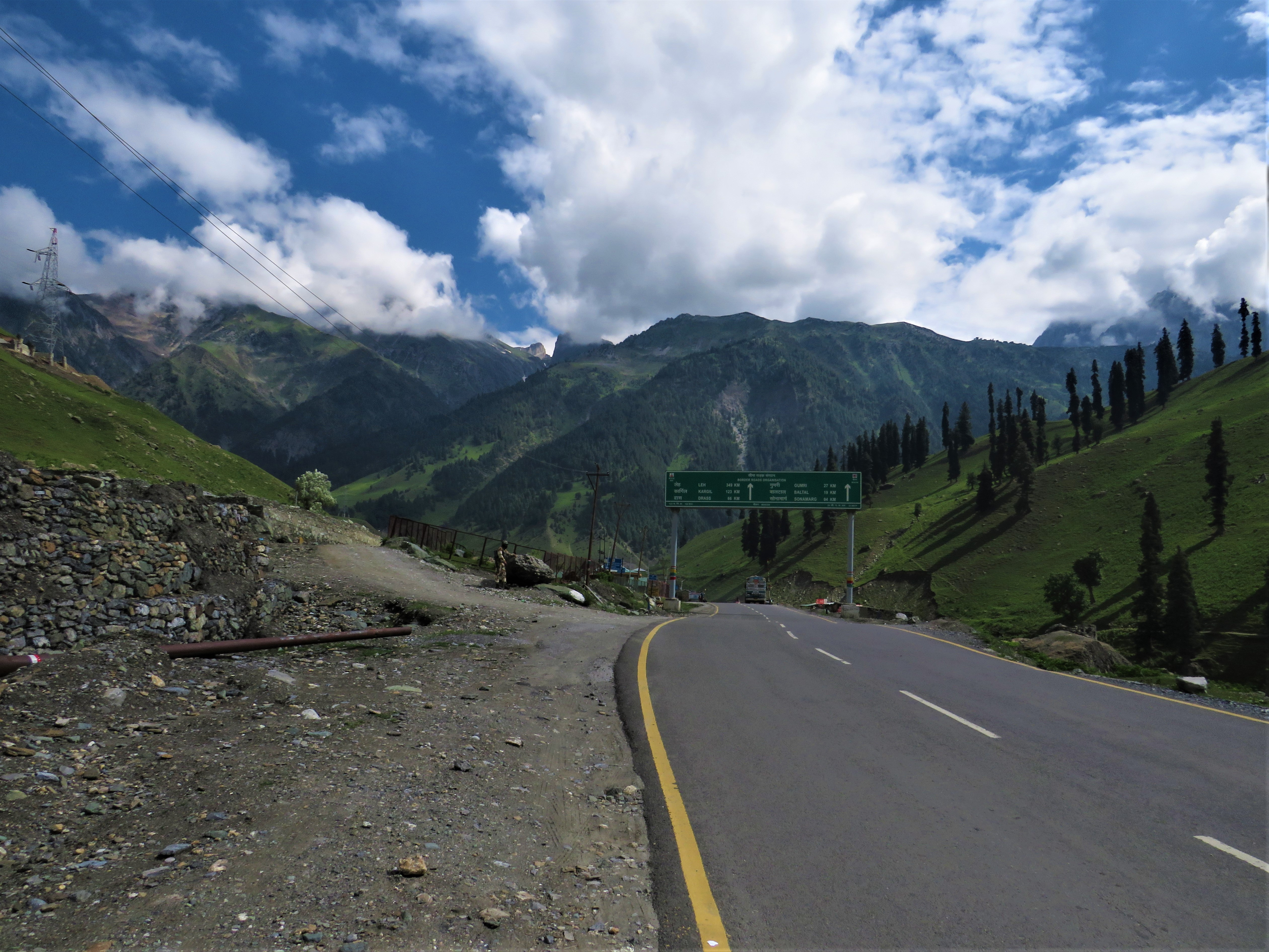
Srinagar Leh National Highway No 1

The Marpo La ridge originates from the Pakistani side of the Line of Control and consists of a succession of mountain peaks that overlook the Mashkoh and Dras valleys in the Indian-administered Kashmir. It dominates the entire Dras sector. Point 5353 is a prominent peak on this ridge, overlooking the strategic National Highway 1 of India linking Srinagar to Leh. It is at an aeral distance of 12 km from Dras, which lies on the National Highway 1.

In 1999, Pakistani forces occupied the high peaks that the Indian army had vacated with the onset of the winter in the region and directed artillery fire at the highway, which led to Indian retaliation and the small-scale conflict known as the Kargil War. The Indian Army fought to regain control of peaks it had lost to the intruders on its side of the LoC. These included Tiger Hill and Tololing peaks and ridgelines, which posed a more direct threat to the highway. Point 5353 was not cleared during the war. Its status, along with that of the nearby peaks—Points 5165 and 5240—was settled during the negotiations after the end of hostilities. The two sides had then agreed to leave Point 5353 as well Points 5165 and 5240, the heights which surround it on either side on the Marpola ridge, unoccupied, based on the consensus that had been reached during the negotiations. However, the consensus did not survive the immediate post-Kargil period. The Indians reoccupied Point 5240, besides Point 5165, in August 1999, while the Pakistanis, in turn, took control of Point 5353.

For Pakistan, the strategic significance and their purpose for holding onto this feature lie in the fact that it provides them a view of the strategically important Marpo La pass, which India dominates. According to one assessment, without Point 5353, they had been finding it difficult to do so. Even before the Kargil war, the Pakistani military planners had been becoming increasingly concerned about their vulnerabilities in this region, having lost posts on the LoC at Marpo La to India before in the pre-Kargil period. To the south of the feature on the Pakistani side, however, lies a strongly glaciated tract, rendering the terrain inhospitable to the Pakistani army, which as a result has been pushed 5–6 km at the back, along the Shingo river, for building defences. This, as a result, has greatly degraded the tactical usefulness of this feature.

India, in turns, controls Point 5070, a strategically important peak along the Marpo La pass. It lies on the Pakistani side of the LoC, about 10 km west of Point 5353. The rest of the area in this region is glaciated, including what is called the Pariyon Ka Talab (literally meaning, "the pond of fairies"). Whereas the Indian supplies are moved along a path hugging the Sando nullah, Pakistani supplies are moved through the Palawar-Bunyal road, which runs along the Shingo river. Their supplies are first off-loaded in nearby villages such as Gultari and Farnshat, then sent to frontline positions including Point 5353.

The Indian deployment on the 18,400 feet (5608 metres) mountain feature in the Kaksar sector along the LoC assumes significance in this context, for this feature overlooks the Shingo river valley in Pakistan. Sitting at this height, the Indian troops can subject the Palawar-Bunyal road to artillery fire at their convenience. Indian troops are also deployed on the adjacent Point 5240, which is another important feature that allows observation of the area. Both Points 5070 and 5240 also overlook the Pakistani supply route for Point 5353.

Point 5353, in turn, dominates the eastern shoulder of the Marpo La pass and the Sando nullah approach to the pass. Since it is the tallest peak in the immediate area, it is said to be a "dominating feature". For the Pakistani army, the access to this peak has not led to a significant increase in their capacity to observe the Indian highway. Several of its posts, on its side of the LoC, such as Point 5108, Twin Bumps and Taimur offer it a comparatively better view of the highway. According to a senior Indian army artillery officer who had served in the area, India enjoys the advantage in this region, for it can subject greater stretches of Palawar-Bunyal Road under artillery fire. According to him, a number of Indian posts offer the Indian army an "unrivalled visibility" of the road.

The Indian Army says that the Pakistani occupation of Point 5353 does not pose a great threat to the National Highway or to its supply lines, and that the peak is not comparable in strategic importance to Tololing and Tiger Hill. Former Lt. Col. Kuldip Singh Ludra states, Point 5353 "dominates, by observation and fire, the complete area on both side of the Line of Control."

In 2000, Praveen Swami claimed in his reports that from Point 5353, the Pakistani army could direct artillery fire up to a 20 km stretch of the Indian highway. In the wake of artillery duels during Operation Parakram, however, he noted that the Pakistani soldiers at Point 5353 were unable to do so, whereas the Indians were able to blow up the Pakistani positions on Point 5353 using Bofors howitzers from the surrounding heights of Point 5165, Point 5240 and Point 5100. Indian army officers state, citing what they call an "intervisibility exercise on a detailed contour map" that the Pakistani soldiers from a point 12 km away could observe only about 0.5 to 1 km of the road.

== Line of Control ==
The 1972 Line of Control is part of the Simla Agreement between India and Pakistan, whereby the two countries agreed to respect the line without prejudice to their respective positions in the Kashmir dispute. The line divided the Indian and Pakistani administered portions of Kashmir. It was delineated by six army officers each of India and Pakistan and signed on 11 December 1972. Its territorial precision is remarkable, according to scholar Brian Cloughley. Along with the agreement, a series of maps indicating the boundary were also prepared and exchanged by the two sides.

The LoC upon coming into effect superseded the erstwhile ceasefire line (CFL) of 1949. The CFL had come into effect in the wake of the Indo-Pakistani War of 1947–1948. It, too, was delineated on maps during the Karachi Agreement of 27 July 1949. The LoC corresponds virtually to the 1949 CFL, save for minor deviations. It runs from the India–Pakistan border in the south to Point NJ9842, covering a length of 740 kilometre. In this region, both the 1949 CFL and the 1972 LoC pass through high peaks, starting from Point 17561 (5353m), thence through Point 17352 (5289m) and finally through Point 18400 (5608m).

Praveen Swami, based on Army's one-inch maps, had estimated that the summit and southern side of Point 5353 were "unmistakenly on the Indian side of the LoC". In his later works, however, Swami noted that the LoC passed through the summit of Point 5353. A couple of other Indian newspapers have stated that Point 5353 was in Indian territory. While several other newspapers and commentators state that the point lies on the LoC. In 2002, The Telegraph reported that in the map that was shown to them, the Point 5353 was on the LoC.

== The pre-Kargil period ==
In his book, MASHKOH: Kargil as I saw it, Brigadier Umesh Singh Bawa, who was the commanding officer of his unit 17 Jat at that time, writes that in June 1998, when his unit was sent to Uplona, Baramulla for a mountain warfare course, he knew "something was brewing" over the LoC in the wake of the nuclear explosions that the two countries had carried out earlier in the same year. At that time, the Pakistani army had been shelling the Indian highway to specifically target the Indian vehicles that were being used to transport supplies for the forthcoming winter. In retribution for the shelling, the Indian senior commanders had ordered Bawa's 17 Jat, besides 14 JAK RIF, which was till then held in reserves, for carrying out offensive operations across the LoC. Bawa's unit was then moved to Sonamarg in early-September 1998, and was allowed the time for the requisite acclimatization and preparation. Bawa narrates that his unit was allotted the task of capturing Point 5353, "across the LoC, close to Marpo La", with a view to silence the artillery observation post that had been supervising the shelling on the Indian highway and elsewhere in Dras.

Bawa's objective was in the area of responsibility of 16 Grenadiers, which was the holding battalion, based in Dras, and had two companies deployed on the LoC in the area. Its commanding officer, Colonel Pushpinder Oberoi, Bawa learned through liaison, was not keen on the prospect of carrying out offensive operations across the LoC, as he thought that would entail changing the status quo, which would have created tensions in the region. But Bawa states, "I had a task in hand and had to complete what come may".

Bawa proceeded about his task collecting information and drawing up his plan. He wanted the 16 grenadiers to send patrols to guide his unit as they were new to the area, but as it turned out the 16 grenadiers themselves had no idea about the terrain, for they had not sent patrols across the LoC hitherto themselves. Bawa realized during the planning that the task at hand was going to be daunting, and fraught with peril. The feature had extremely steep slopes on the front face, due to which an assault from the front could not be mounted. The rear slopes were found to be more gradual, but attacking from the rear, Bawa said, entailed crossing the LoC at night and the risk of getting detected by dawn as the area lacked any cover. Bawa was still contemplating about his course of action, when, in late September 1998, the Indian PM Atal Bihari Vajpayee initiated a peace process with the Prime Minister of Pakistan, Nawaz Sharif, in the form of back channel efforts. Thereafter, the operations were put on hold and ultimately countermanded by the army.

== Point 5353 during the Kargil war ==
Some correspondents state that during the Kargil War itself there was never any doubt about the orientation of Point 5353 or the Army's intent to recapture it. For instance, PTI reported in August 1999, "Meanwhile, fighting is still going on for recapturing the point 5353 in Mushkoh valley, situated on the Line of Control (LOC), which Islamabad claims to be part of Pakistan."

== Controversy after the Kargil War ==
Soon after the Kargil War was over, some Indian media reported that Point 5353, a strategically important peak in the Dras sector, was still under Pakistan's control. After this, the Indian Army said that the media reports were an "inspired" campaign to malign their image. They said that the peak was never in Indian possession.

=== Praveen Swami's reports in The Hindu Business Line, and subsequent controversy ===
In August 2000, a noted Indian journalist, Praveen Swami, authored reports in The Hindu Business Line on this subject, wherein he claimed, citing copies of "army's own one-inch maps", that the Point 5353 was "inside the Indian side of the Line of Control" and the Pakistani troops "held the mountain through the Kargil war and continue to do so today." According to Swami, "Artillery observers on peak 5,353 metres can direct accurate artillery fire on to up to 20 km of the National Highway 1A, and cripple Indian defensive positions from Mushkoh to Bhimbet." Swami narrated that, during the war, the Indian commander Amar Aul of the 56 Mountain Brigade was given the objective of securing point 5353, but he occupied two peaks on the Pakistani side of the Line of Control, point 4875 and point 4251 before the ceasefire came into force. Aul's tactics, according to Swami, were "designed to secure a subsequent territorial exchange." In the negotiations carried out between the Brigadier Aul and a Pakistani interlocutor called Colonel Saqlian in mid-August 1999, both sides committed themselves to leave the points 5353, 5240, 4251 and 4875 unoccupied. In October 1999, according to the report, Brigadier Aul decided to take control of the point 5240 as well as point 5353. 16 Grenadiers successfully took control of 5240. However, 1–3 Gurkha Rifles, tasked with taking control of 5353, did not proceed with the attack for reasons "still not clear". The report further claimed that the Pakistani troops, upon detecting Indian activity at 5240, retaliated at point 5353 and by November 1999, established themselves at the peak. Subsequently, they put up concrete bunkers on the peak and constructed a road linking the base of the peak to Benazir Post. Swami believed that the Indian Army then attempted to force a territorial swap by taking positions on the Pakistani side of the Line of Control in the Batalik sector, which lies to the east of Kargil. He noted that, in one such operation on 14 April 2000, the troops of the 14 Sikh Regiment occupied the until then unheld Point 5310, which was situated one kilometre inside the Pakistani side of the LoC. Swami concluded by noting that "the end of the conflict is...not quite yet in sight."

Brigadier Surinder Singh, and a few others, who had all been removed from the command, had also accused the army, among other instances of command dereliction, of losing Point 5353 to Pakistan. This prompted the then Indian Director General of Military Operations (DGMO) Nirmal Chander Vij to issue a press release, with detailed maps and notes, in which he asserted that the LoC passes through Point 5353 as per the Simla Agreement. "This point", he stated, "was never under our control either before or after Operation Vijay in Kargil."

However, Praveen Swami stood by his report, stating that The Hindu had in its possession copies of the "army's own one-inch maps" as well as orders issued to the commanders to capture Point 5353 on 18 May 1999. Swami then said that the "Army's denial" had answered "none" of the questions he had raised, starting from the "army's own one-inch maps", which he claimed showed the summit and southern side of Point 5353 to be "unmistakenly on the Indian side of the LoC", and ending with the army's actions across the LoC in the Batalik sector. He further said that it was "unclear" why, if Point 5353 was not on its side or assumed to straddle the LoC, had the army occupied two peaks on the Pakistani side of the LoC with a view to barter them for Points 5353 and 5240.

Swami, however, noted that the 16 Grenadiers' records "interestingly" showed Point 5353 as "a minor objective," and so did the entries in the service records of its CO Colonel Oberoi. He went on to note that "this assessment was vindicated during the artillery clashes in 2001–2002, when the Pakistani observation posts on Point 5353 were unable to bring accurate fire to bear on either the highway or nearby Indian positions. The Indian troops were able to tie down the Pakistani position with accurate fire, rendering it near-impossible for its superior altitude to be used to good effect."

Writing in The Tribune in 2004, Ashok K. Mehta, an independent security analyst based in New Delhi, India, however pointed out that the peaks, which the local commanders of the two armies had agreed to leave unoccupied, were Points 5165, 5353 and 5240, which, he wrote, were all on the LoC. It is in this context, he noted that "None of these was ever with the Indian Army. Nor were these at the time in Pakistani possession." He said that Point 5240 was captured by the Indian troops in late October 1999. Thereafter, they took Point 5165 as well in order to forestall their capture by Pakistanis. According to Ashok Mehta, "Taking Points 5240 and 5165 was not difficult, keeping them was tough. The mystery was over not taking Point 5353. It appears the unit asked to do so said it was impossible to get there. But Pakistan had breached the local commanders' agreement and turned Point 5353 into a rope-maintained permanent post."

Four years later, Swami himself took a contradictory position. Writing in the Frontline, he described the LoC to be passing through the summit of Point 5353. He wrote, "Consider, for example, the case of Point 5353, named for its height in metres above sea level, from the summit of which the LoC takes a gentle southeastern turn. In the wake of the Kargil War, a series of local tactical errors allowed Pakistan to occupy the southern face of Point 5353, allowing enemy forces a clear view of Sando Top, an important post."

=== Army rebuttals ===
In this context, General Ved Prakash Malik, who was the Indian Army Chief of Staff during the Kargil war, stated: "The LoC in this area was drawn in 1972 by joining several heights (points) with straight lines. The line went over Point-5353. Sometime after 1972 – well before Kargil war – the Pakistan army had occupied it. During the war, 8 Mountain division made no attempt to capture it." Similarly, Lieutenant General Amar Aul, who was named by Swami in his reports, said: "No army was occupying these posts before the war. Pakistan had occupied it before the war and it was not in our area…", while adding that no attempt was made to capture Point-5353.

In his book Kargil: Turning the Tide, Lieutenant general Mohinder Puri, who was the General Officer Commanding (GOC) of the 8 Mountain Division during the Kargil War, gives his account of the matter:

A lot of controversy was generated on the status of Pt 5353 after the war. This feature lies on the Pakistan side and to capture it, the attacking troops have to approach from the north entailing crossing the LC. Since the LC was not to be crossed and the feature being on Pakistan side, we had no plans to secure it. The enemy occupied Pt 5353 as an observation post. In turn, we were in occupation of a feature on the LC. The Pakistani CO established radio contact with CO 16 GREN and requested vacation from this feature. We asked him to reciprocate and vacate Pt 5353 to which he agreed. However, he reoccupied Pt 5353 on 2 August and in retaliation besides occupying the feature vacated by us, 16 GREN was directed to occupy Pt 5245 which was southeast of Pt 5353. With this event the war ended in the Mushkoh–Drass sector.

The Times of India quoted Indian Army officers saying that the Line of Control in the area follows an "imaginary line" connecting high points such as Points 5070, 5353, 5245 and 5608. It was said that the Indian forces control the highest one, Point 5608, whereas the Pakistanis control Point 5353, because that is what the terrain allows. They believed that the tactical advantage to Pakistan from controlling the point 5353 is minimal.

=== Ram Kumar Anand's allegations ===
At a press conference on 30 August 2000, an opposition party leader, Ram Kumar Anand, alleged that Point 5353, along with five other peaks that belonged to India, was still in the occupation of Pakistan, contrary to what the Indian Parliament had been told. He claimed that Point 5353 was 300 to 500 metres inside the Indian territory. He supplied reporters with several documents to challenge the Indian Army's claim that Point 5353 was never in Indian possession. He claimed that India stationed army personnel on Point 5353 in 1992–93, who then cut off the supply routes of the Pakistani positions along the Line of Control for almost two months. He said that the Indian Army then said, the Point 5353 is "within our LoC and that we have every right to patrol the area," while claiming that this peak offered a 40 km view of the Pakistani side of the LoC. He also claimed that an Indian Army platoon, led by Major Navneet Mehta had tried to recapture the peak on 18 May 1999 but the attempt had failed. He demanded that "a fact-finding team of five Parliamentarians should be constituted to go to the LoC to verify the facts." Pakistan, the very next day, on 31 August, denied the allegations. BBC News quoted Pakistan's Foreign Ministry's spokesman as saying that "Pakistan respected the Line of Control (LoC) with India" and its troops had not violated the ceasefire line. The BBC news report noted that Anand's claim "followed a report in an Indian newspaper that a strategic peak, Point 5353, was under Pakistani occupation."

The Indian government, on its part, dismissed Anand's allegations as "motivated" and "harmful to the security interests of the country. Indian defence ministry on 1 September 2000 issued a press release that stated: "It is clarified that Point 5353 is on the line of control and not inside the territory under India's control" and "the controversy being raked up on this issue is based on distorted facts as borne out from maps of delineation between India and Pakistan in 1972." It further stated that "the ground situation is well-known to the government and India's posture along the LoC is militarily sound with an edge over the other side".

Ashok Mehta said that in the encounter with RK Anand, the Indian Army was "forced to reveal certain information, which in national interest should have remained under wraps", adding that "Pakistan was prompt to report that it had not violated the Line of Control in Kargil."

General Malik, in his book Kargil: From Surprise to Victory, discusses the matter in the context of Anand's allegations:

In August 2000, an opposition party leader held a press conference and, without ascertaining facts from the Army, claimed that Pakistan was continuing to occupy six peaks on our side of the LoC in Kargil. The Army was once again brought into this political crossfire. It was alleged that the Army had not disclosed the true facts. There were several critical reports in the media the next day. Despite denials by Army Headquarters, and even by the Pakistani military spokesman, the controversy continued. A rather vicious report was published in the Statesman, New Delhi, in the first week of September 1999. When factual details were conveyed to the then editor-in-chief, C.R. Irani (who passed away on 23 July 2005), a journalist known for his courage and convictions, he promptly wrote an editorial entitled 'Sorry Chief! We Apologize for the Publication Yesterday'. In this column, he not only apologized but also condemned political leaders tending to denigrate the Army by making unverified statements.

=== Other commentaries ===
- General Malik, in an interview to Rediff.com on 27 July 2001, when asked about to "clarify the controversy about Point 5353, which has reportedly been taken over by Pakistan?", said: "That is not true. The 1972 letter clearly shows, both on the map and in writing, that the LoC passes through 5353. Some of the Point's features are occupied by them and some by us. But the fact is that if you want to attack Point 5353, you would have to come via the Pakistani side. It is not with us. We had never occupied it. Point 5353 had been vacated by them for a while when the talks were going on. Then they reoccupied it, that's all. I don't know how this controversy started. But I saw the hand-sketched map in which somebody had put 5353 right next to Tiger Hill. That is wrong!"
- In June 2004, in the wake of the Subramaniam Committee report, Retired Brigadier Surinder Singh, who commanded the 121 Infantry Brigade and was sacked for alleged poor performance, claimed that the Point 5353, which was "adjacent to Tiger Hill", was 300 meters inside Indian territory. While rejecting the reports of the Subramaniam Committee, he told reporters that this committee was instituted to "cover up government`s failure and save the army`s top brass," while demanding the then Indian defence minister Pranab Mukherjee`s intervention for checking into the "authenticity" of the Pakistani troops' occupancy at Point 5353.

=== Operation Parakram ===
The Point 5353 controversy erupted once again during "Operation Parakram" (India's Code name for its military mobilization along the India–Pakistan border) which began on 13 December 2001, in response to the terrorist attack on the Indian Parliament. By this time the area north and east of Zojila Pass, including Leh, came under the newly raised XIV Corps.

In August 2002, The Hindu correspondent Praveen Swami reported that Pakistani troops had occupied Point 5070 in the early summer of 2002, and in July, "after eight weeks of steady skirmishes, India reoccupied Point 5070 in the Dras sector." He further said: "Point 5070, named for its altitude in metres, dominates the strategically vital Mushkoh nullah in the Dras sub-sector."

The Telegraph of 27 August 2002, reported that "In a map shown to The Telegraph today at the army headquarters, Point 5353 is depicted on the Line of Control, at an aerial distance of about 12 km from Dras", and a battalion of the Pakistan Army's Baloch Regiment was in possession of the peak, which it said was flanked on either side (east and west) by a battalion each of Northern Light Infantry and Punjab Regiment, supported by the Pakistani brigade headquarters at Gultari. It further stated that Point 5353 is on the Marpo La ridgeline that runs on or parallel to the Line of Control. Other spurs of the peak run south into the Dras sector. To its immediate south is Tiger Hill and the Mushkoh Valley. In 1999, Pakistani intruders occupying the heights in this sector were directing artillery fire on Dras and National Highway 1A and were alleged to have planned to secure routes for infiltration into the Valley." The newspaper quoted army officers as saying that, "There are heights from which we have a view of the PoK side and there are heights from where they have a view of our side. Besides, air observation posts (artillery observers on aircraft) can also mount a watch to direct fire. The view from Point 5353 does not seriously threaten our supply lines." It also quoted the then Indian Defence Minister, George Fernandes, as saying in 1999 that "5353 is the point over which the Line of Control goes. The fact is our troops never occupied it. The normal practice has been that where the line goes over a peak, nobody occupies it." Nonetheless, it noted that "even if Fernandes is taken at his word, the continued occupation of Point 5353 by the Baluch battalion means that Pakistan has departed from "normal practice"."

Ashok Mehta, in his article in The Tribune, said, "Parakram had opened a window of opportunity in the Kargil sector for the new 14 Corps to complete the Army's unfinished agenda for the Kargil war: seize Point 5353. While throughout April and May 2002, Point 5353 was pulverised with metal from Bofors guns, sometimes 10,000 rounds a day, Concourse missiles, cargo ammunition and air defence guns in direct fire, by May-end, Point 5070, a pivotal feature about 10 km west of Point 5353, was quietly seized in a brilliant stealth operation. The post was named Balwan after the Jat regiment that took it. Balwan had turned the flank of Pakistani defences in the Dras sector. The Indian Army now had a grand view and domination of the Gultari valley through which Pakistani posts are maintained in Dras."

The surprise loss of Point 5070 drew furious reaction from Pakistan Army, who used to occupy this peak during summer. The Pakistani troops launched several counter-attacks but failed to retake Point 5070, as the Indians, despite suffering heavy casualties, continued to hold onto this feature. Consequently, an enraged General Pervez Musharraf removed entire Pakistani chain of command, including the Pakistani Brigade Commander and GOC of the Northern Areas for losing this peak. Subsequently, a new Commander of the Northern Areas was appointed.

On 10 June 2002, an Indian Army patrol managed to make their way to Point 5353, where they found several wounded Pakistani soldiers crying for help. Afterwards, the date of the attack on Point 5353 was fixed for 17 June. The then Indian Army's northern area commander, Lieutenant general R.K. Nanavaty went to New Delhi with the final plan and for the green signal. Richard Armitage, then American Deputy Secretary of State had arrived in Delhi a few days earlier, where he had revealed General Musharraf's pledge, in his words: "To end cross-border terrorism permanently, visibly, irreversibly and to the satisfaction of India." Hence, George Fernandes, then India's defence minister denied permission to General Nanavaty to attack Point 5353 and thus the attack was called off.

Praveen Swami wrote on 10 March 2004:

When Operation Parakram began a little over three years ago, both the Indian Army and the Pakistan Army began trading ferocious artillery fire up and down the LoC. In the high mountains, sudden winds and unpredictable atmospheric conditions ensure that shells rarely land where gunners intend them to. But, with a direct line of observation available to them, the Pakistani forces on Point 5353 should have been able to pass on corrections that would have enabled their artillery to obliterate Sando Top. If, that is, the Pakistani troops on Point 5353 had been given the chance. Indian soldiers on three posts, namely Point 5165, Point 5240 and Point 5100, guided their superior 155-millimetre Bofors howitzers with devastating accuracy. Pakistani troops on Point 5353 were first hit with smoke-filled mortar shells, to flush them out of their bunkers, and then with air-burst artillery, which showered down shards of metal at great speed. Well over 40 Pakistanis are believed to have died on Point 5353. Pakistan could not reinforce the troops since the Indian soldiers on Point 5165 and Point 5240 were in a position to hit their supply lines.

== See also ==
- List of mountains in Pakistan
- Shangruti

== Bibliography ==
- Ludra, Kuldip Singh (2000), The Kargil Strike: (A Study of the Failure of Indian Strategic Thought), T.K.S. Ludra, ISBN 978-81-901218-9-7
- Ludra, Kuldip Singh (2004), The Pen Supports the Sword, Kargil--A Report, Institute for Strategic Studies Research and Analysis, ISBN 978-81-901361-8-1
- Malik, V. P. (2006). Kargil from Surprise to Victory. HarperCollins Publishers India. ISBN 978-81-7223-635-9.
- Rammohun, E. M. (2011), Countering Insurgencies in India: An Insider's View, Vij Books India Pvt Ltd, ISBN 978-93-81411-66-7
- Singh, Amarinder (2001), A Ridge Too Far: War in the Kargil Heights 1999, Motibagh Palace, ISBN 978-81-931074-1-6
- Bammi, Y. M. (2002). Kargil 1999, impregnable conquered. Gorkha Publishers. ISBN 978-81-7525-352-0.
- Ganguly, Sumit (2004). The Kashmir Question: Retrospect and Prospect. Routledge. ISBN 978-1-63633-740-1.
- Bawa, Umesh Singh (2020). MASHKOH: Kargil as I saw it. Notion Press. ISBN 978-81-7525-352-0.
- Lavoy, Peter R. (2009). Asymmetric Warfare in South Asia The Causes and Consequences of the Kargil Conflict. Cambridge University Press. ISBN 978-1-139-48282-0.
