= Yaldor Sub Sector =

- village
- Location in Ladakh Yaldor Sub Sector (India)
- Coordinates: 34.6755°N 76.4768°E
- Country: India
- Union territory: Ladakh
- District: Leh
- Tehsil: Khalsi
- Time zone: UTC+5:30 (IST)

Yaldor Sub Sector was the scene of some of the major infiltration by Pakistani Northern Light Infantry battalions and some of the major battles of Kargil War were fought here. The sub-sector includes Yaldor, a hamlet of the Dah village in the Indus river basin in the Leh district of Ladakh in India. The village, in the upper reaches of the mountains near the Line of Control that divided the Indian-administered Jammu and Kashmir and Kashmir, abuts the Yaldor nullah. The area was a focal point during the Kargil War because of its strategic location between Kargil, Leh and Baltistan. Only a few shepherds live in Yaldor village, spending their summers here and their winters in Garkhun (Garkon), taking their livestock with them. One of the shepherds from Garkhun, Tashi Namgyal, was looking for a missing yak and was the first to report infiltrators from Pakistan on 3 May 1999 to the Indian Army. This was confirmed by sighting of some radio antennas sticking out of rocks opposite Indian Army defenses near Banju and Kukarthang in Yaldor Sub-Sector, and Indian Army ascertained that at least 350 Pakistan Army men had infiltrated. The village has an army patrol base, which was set up in 1997 even before the Kargil infiltration of 1999. As of 2019, the village is out of bounds for tourists. "Batalik-Khalse Road" (BK Road), 78 km long road to this touristy Aryan Valley which includes Yaldor Sub Sector, has been upgraded.

== Terrain and weather ==
The Yaldor nullah is an integral part of the area's terrain. It is made up of two streams: Yaldor West, or Gragrio, and Yaldor East, or Junk Lungpa. They merge at their namesake village before joining the Indus River at Dah. Due to mountainous terrain the roads in the area of the village are serpentine. Known during the Kargil war for its difficult terrain, Yaldor was the focal point to launch attack on the 4,821-m Kukerthang and the 5,103-m Tharu despite many nullahs and non-tactical terrain. The terrain is so difficult that Indian Army and Pakistan Army, under mutual understanding left their posts in this area of LoC unattended during the harsh winter. Located in the eastern part of the Batalik–Chorbat La sector with some of the most rugged terrain after Siachen Glacier, average mountain heights here range from 15,000 to 19,000 ft (4,600 to 5,800 m). Temperatures in winter range from minus 10–15 degrees Celsius during the day to minus 35–40 degree at night. Even in summer, overnight temperatures generally hover around minus 5–10 degrees.

== Wildlife ==
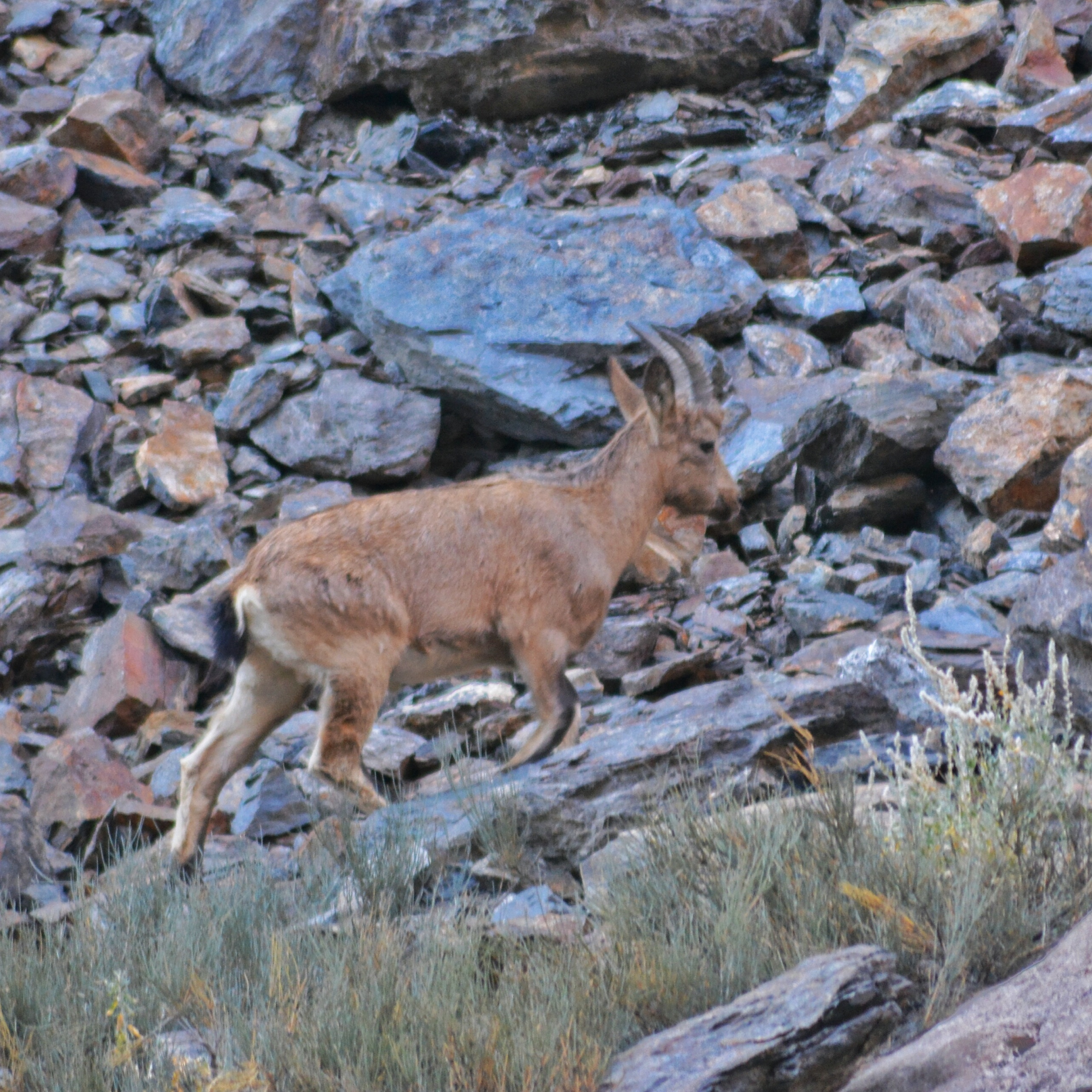

Though the area is known for bitter cold weather, a lot of birds and mammals can be seen in and around Yaldor. These include Pallas Dippers, Blue whistling thrush, Brown Dipper and Greenish Leaf Warblers. Also can be seen are Common Swift, Eurasian Crag Martin, Large-billed Crow, and Mountain Chiffchaff. Among other bird species in the area include Grey Wagtail, Hume's leaf warbler, Red-mantled Rosefinch and Red-fronted Serin. Occasionally Himalayan Ibex can also be seen in the area.

== Kargil war 1999 ==
Yaldor Sub Sector was infiltrated by battalions of the Pakistani Northern Light Infantry, and some of the major battles of Kargil War were fought here including battles to retake Jubar, Point 4812, Point 5203, Munthodalo, and Khalubar. During the war a helipad was built in the area for safe transport of troops and material.

Between 3–5 May 1999 two Indian army patrols in Yaldor area encountered a group of armed men, from Pakistan-administered Kashmir. The Indian Army's first contact in the Banju area with infiltrators from Pakistan, who aimed to seize mountain peaks inside India to escalate Kashmir conflict. This encounter culminated in the Kargil War. The scene of some of the major battles of Kargil War, in May 1999 the 12 JKLI went through the Junk Lungpa (Lungpa means stream in Ladakhi) at night to drive a wedge between enemy's defenses on Point 5203 and Khalubar Ridge, and captured Point 5390. During Operation Vijay the 70 Infantry Brigade was responsible for recovery of maximum quantity of arms and ammunition and killing over 300 enemy personnel in this sector. It also captured 6 PoWs alive, providing much needed proof of Pakistani involvement. The Ladakh Buddhist Association (LBA) which played a key role in providing porters for the Indian Army during the conflict also sent LBA youth volunteers to Yaldor on June 23, 1999 to act as porters. Brigadier Devinder Singh, the commander of an infantry brigade, who was given the responsibility for conducting operations in Batalik-Yaldor sector during Operation Vijay, was conferred VSM for his actions. Captain Amol Kalia VrC (posthumous) of 12 Jammu and Kashmir Light Infantry, was martyred on June 8, 1999, along with 13 other soldiers, while trying to recapture Point 5203, a 5,200-metre (17,000 ft) high feature in the Kargil-Yaldor Sector. Captain BM Cariappa of 5 PARA, that took part in the battle to recapture Point 5203 was awarded Vir Chakra for his gallantry in several battles in sector. By July 8, 1999 almost the entire Yaldor sector was liberated. The Ladakh Scouts, one of the first units to be deployed in the region for Operation Vijay, were awarded Unit citation for bravery during the battles in the Batalik-Yaldor-Chorbatla sector, especially for capture of Point 5203. They were also awarded the Chief of Army Staff Banner for gallantry, which was received by Captain Naresh Bishnoi of 71 Armoured Regiment on deputation with Ladakh Scouts. The attack on Point 5203 was led by Capt Naresh Bishnoi, the company commander of L Company, Karokaram Wing Ladakh Scouts on the night of 21/22 June 1999. This company under this captain (nicknamed Nabi by the Pakistanis) thereafter in a series of relentless operations re-captured Dog Hill, Stangba, Pandma Go and then Point 5229 between 5 July and 10 July 1999 from the Pakistanis. The company captured Nk Inayat Ali of 5 NLI alive, and a huge cache of arms and ammunition left behind by the fleeing Pakistanis. Capt Naresh Bishnoi was awarded the Sena Medal for Gallantry for these operations Major M. Sarvanan of 1 Bihar battalion lost his life on May 29, 1999 while trying to capture Point 4268, he was awarded VrC (posthumous) for his actions, his body was recovered by Indian troops only on July 7, 1999. Major Sonam Wangchuk of Ladakh Scouts was awarded the Mahavir Chakra for actions in same area on June 2, 1999.

The 17 Garhwal Rifles, was deployed in the Batalik-Yaldor sector operated under the 70 Infantry Brigade, a formation of the 3 Infantry Division. By early May 1999, Pakistan had infiltrated upto 4 to 8 kilometers across Line of Control occupying fortified positions in high-altitude terrain. In the Batalik-Yaldor sector, intrusions were first detected during early May. As enemy was in elevated and concealed positions, both Indian Army artillery and air support couldn't dislodge them. It forced Indian Army to devise a plan to carve out a corridor through Junk Lungpa, aiming to split the enemy intrusion zone and regain operational control. The mission was entrusted to 12 JAK LI, 10 Para (Special Forces), and a company of Ladakh Scouts. By 3 June 1999, the mission was completed, opening a critical corridor to the LoC. However, Pakistani troops still held commanding positions. Capture of Point 5203 on 8 June 1999, allowed India to focus on the dominant enemy held positions on the western flank of Jubar Ridge, namely Bump II, Bump III, Kala Pathar, and Mound. The responsibility fell on 17 Garhwal Rifles, under the leadership of Captain Jintu Gogoi. Each feature was to be attacked by a dedicated company, and reconnaissance confirmed enemy presence between Bump II and Bump III, where Para SF had earlier conducted limited operations. A firm base was established at a location called Flat Area in China Nala. From here, final assault on the evening of 29 June 1999, under fading light led by Captain Gogoi began with nearly steep climb of nearly one kilometer in high-altitude conditions. As they reached the ridge, they were detected and soon encircled by enemy. In the intense firefight that followed, many soldiers of 17 Garhwal Rifles were killed. Despite the heavy losses, the battalion continued the attacks in the days that followed and successful;y captured all the assigned objectives. It paved the way for further advances, including the seizure of a key feature in the Muntho Dhalo complex, culminating in the eventual capture of Point 5285, a major tactical victory.

== Post Kargil war 1999 ==
H. S. Panag after taking over as Brigade Commander in January 2000 oversaw a military operation in the Yaldor Sub Sector that destroyed 35 Pakistani bunkers and killed several Pakistani soldiers across the LoC, giving India complete control over Batalik sector. Another operation in May 2000 allowed Indian Army led by 3 Punjab and 1 Bihar to take control of 12 km (7.5 mi) of the Karubar Bowl on the Pakistani side. This also gave the Indian Army an option to threaten the Pakistani posts opposite Turtuk sector. He also ensured that Pakistan could not set up a post on Dolmi Barak, a 6,100-metre (20,000 ft) high peak on the eastern side of Karubar Bowl.

== See also ==
- Point 5310
