= Shangruti =

Shangruti شنگروتی
- Location within Gilgit Baltistan

Highest point
- Elevation: 17,531 ft (5,343 m)
- Coordinates: 34.7434530°N 76.3975707°E

Geography
- Location: Skardu District, Gilgit-Baltistan, Pakistan
- Parent range: Ladakh Range

Shangruti (Urdu: شنگروتی) is a mountain peak located on the Pakistani side of the Line of Control in Kharmang District, Gilgit-Baltistan, Pakistan. It has a height of 17,531 feet (5,343 m).

The east–west-running watershed ridge next to Shangruti, referred to as the Shangruti ridge, serves as the de facto border between Pakistan-administered Baltistan and Indian-administered Ladakh.

== Maps ==
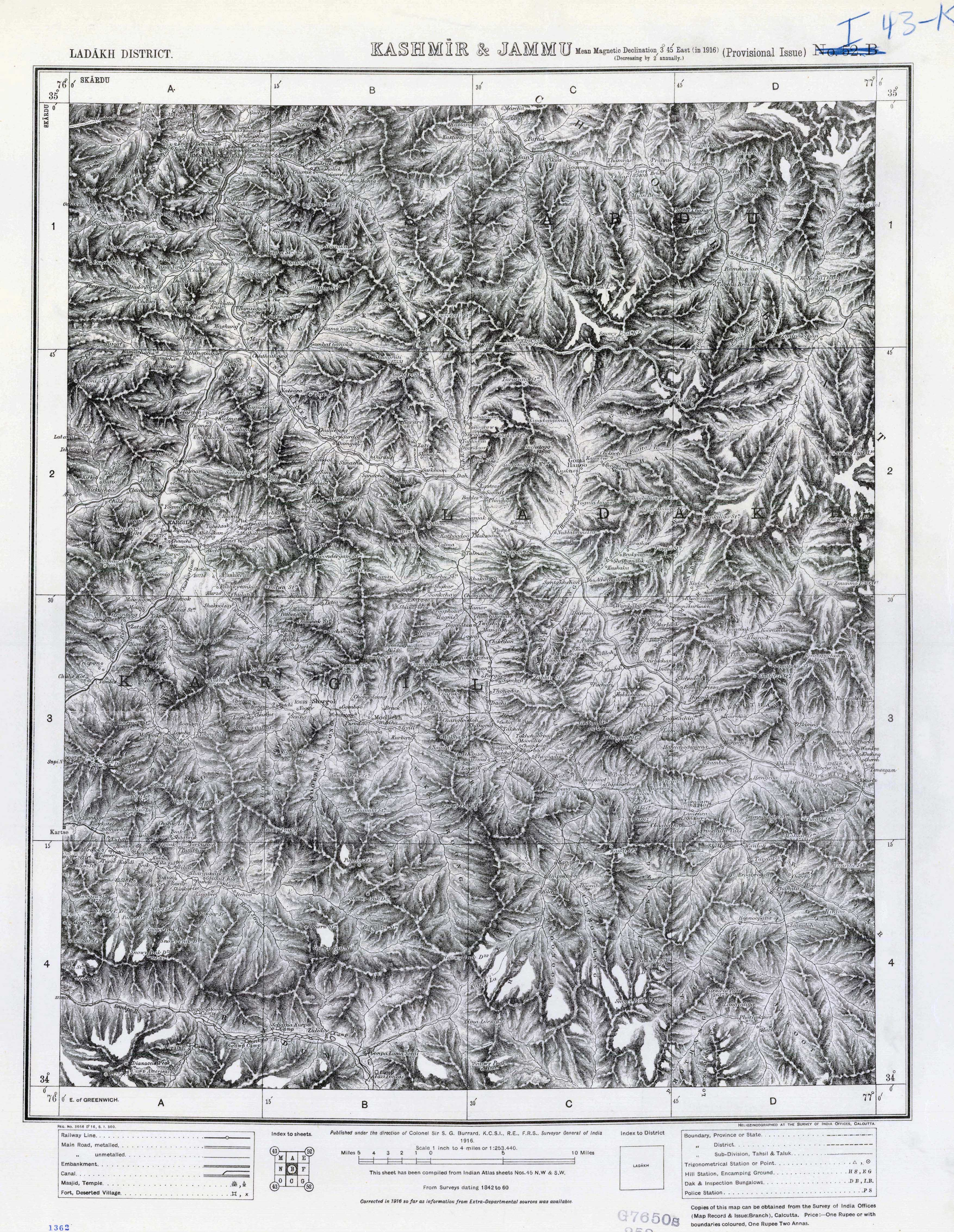
SoI map, 1916

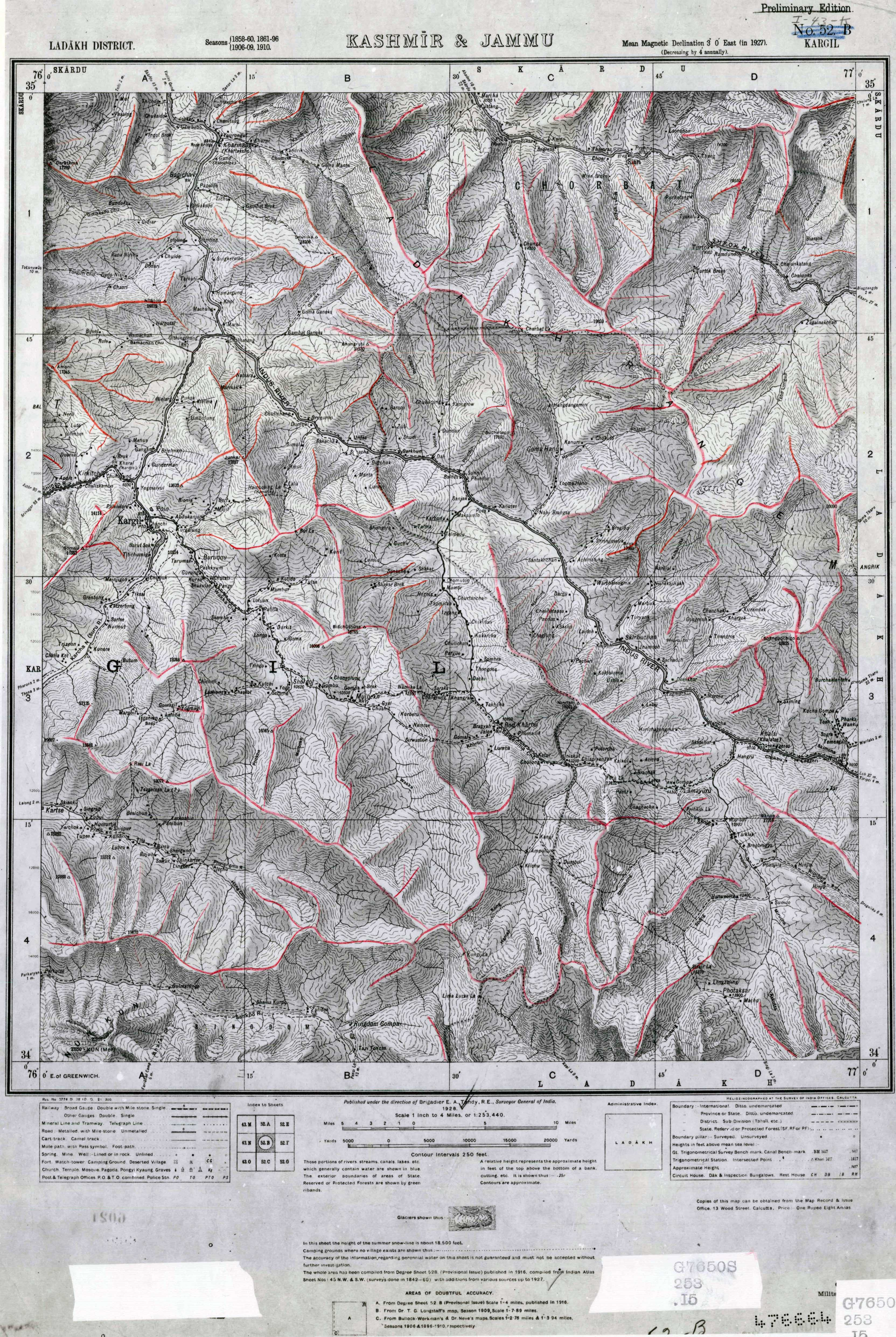
SoI map, 1928

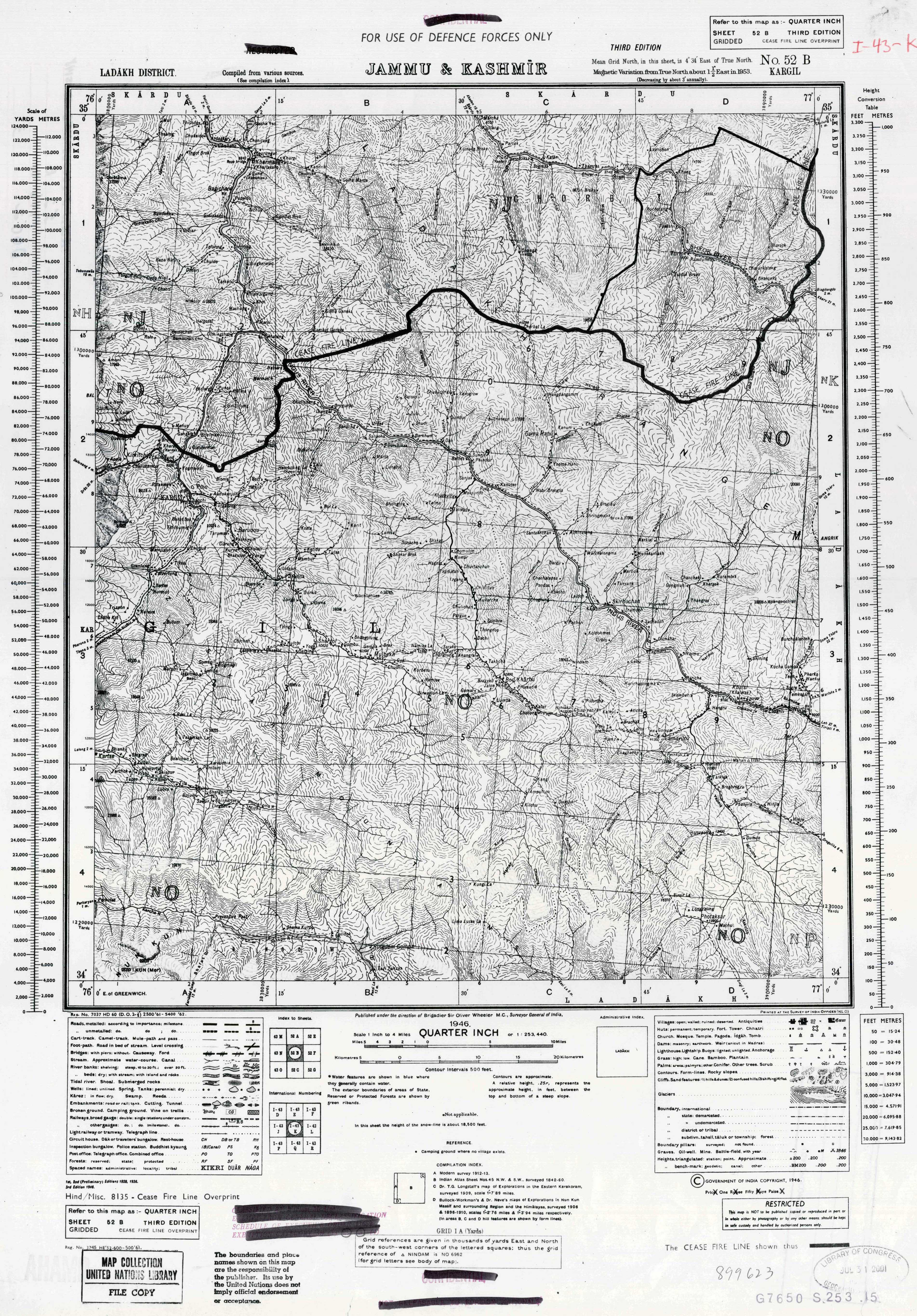
SoI map, 1946, showing the 1948 LoC

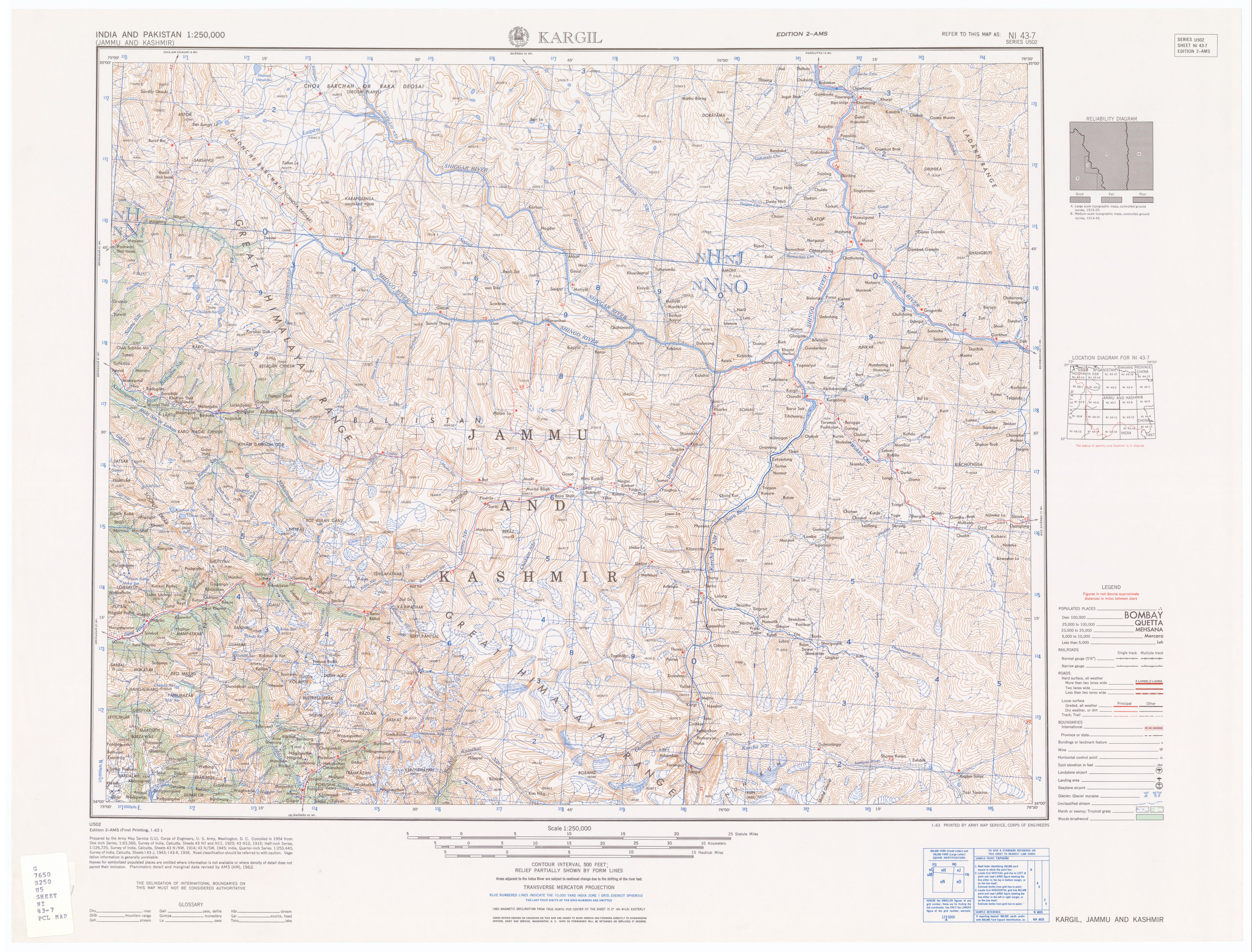
AMS map, 1955

== See also ==
- Ganokh
- Aryan Valley
- Yaldor Sub Sector
- List of mountains in Pakistan
