= Kaluchak massacre =

2002 attack in Jammu and Kashmir

Coordinates: 32.660°N 74.880°E

- Location: Kaluchak, Jammu and Kashmir, India
- Date: 14 May 2002 (IST, UTC+05:30)
- Target: Tourist bus, Army camp
- Attack type: Shooting
- Deaths: 31 (+ 3 terrorists)
- Injuries: 47
- Perpetrator: Lashkar-e-Taiba

The Kaluchak massacre was a terrorist attack on 14 May 2002 near the town of Kaluchak in the Indian state Jammu and Kashmir. Three militants attacked a Himachal Road Transport Corporation bus from the Indian state of Himachal Pradesh from Manali to Jammu and killed 7 people. After that they entered the family quarter of the Army and fired indiscriminately at the inmates, killing 23 persons, including 10 children, eight women and five Army men. The age of the children killed ranged from four to 10 years. Thirty-four people were injured in the attack.

== The massacre ==
The terrorists reportedly crossed the Line of Control from Pakistan and boarded the bus at Vijaypur. When the bus neared Kaluchak, they shot the driver and the conductor and opened fire on the passengers. On hearing the shots in the bus, the Indian army soldiers fired in their direction. The terrorists, who were dressed in Indian army fatigues, returned fire and attempted to escape to the Army's family quarters, located on the main road. They also threw grenades on some vehicles parked in the vicinity. Upon entering the family quarters, they again fired on Army family members present in the premises. The terrorists were eventually cordoned off and killed by 10 a.m. The death toll amounted to 31 killed, including 3 Army personnel, 18 Army family members and 10 civilians. There were 47 wounded including 12 Army personnel, 20 Army family members and 15 civilians. The dead included ten children.

The three terrorists killed in this incident were Pakistani nationals: Abu Suhail of (Faisalabad, Pakistan; Abu Murshed (Mohammed Munir) of Salamatpura in Gujranwala, Pakistan; and Abu Javed (Amzad Salam Bin Mohammed Gisha) of Guda Giriya, Gujranwala, Pakistan. The government sources stated that biscuits and chocolates found on the persons of the gunmen revealed that they were purchased from Zafarwal, Pakistan.

== Reaction in India ==
Indian Prime minister Atal Bihari Vajpayee termed the massacre "a most inhuman and brutal carnage". Hundreds of army personnel and their family members held candlelight prayers on Friday night in memory of those killed in one of the worst ever terrorist strikes in Jammu and Kashmir, in May 2002. Jaswant Singh, then-Minister for External Affairs, writes in his book A Call To Honour – In Service of Emergent India that the Kaluchak incident was the last straw that almost led to war between India and Pakistan (see 2001-2002 India-Pakistan standoff), and was the closest that Pakistan and India came to war.

Indian Union Minister of State for External Affairs Omar Abdullah blamed Pakistan for this massacre and argued for escalating the response against Pakistan, citing the "sheer barbarity" of the attack. Chief Minister of Jammu and Kashmir Farooq Abdullah also blamed Pakistani intruders, calling them "animals."

Members of Parliament of India unanimously blamed Pakistan for this attack. On 18 May 2002, India expelled Pakistan's Ambassador Ashraf Jehangir Qazi. Cabinet Committee on Security (CCS) decided to place the paramilitary forces and Coast Guard under the command of the Army and Navy. Reportedly American officials told NYT that India is taking the steps needed to go to war.

== International reactions ==
The President of the United States George W. Bush condemned the massacre as a "terrible and outrageous act" and said that he was "appalled at the incident".

The Presidency of the European Union "strongly condemned the brutal terrorist attack in Kaluchak (Jammu and Kashmir), which resulted in the death of numerous innocent civilians" and expressed sympathy to the Government of India for its problems in controlling terrorism in Kashmir.

Pakistan arrested Lashkar-e-Taiba chief Hafiz Muhammad Saeed, lending credence to the group's connection to the attack.

In 2003, the Australian government declared Lashkar-e-Taiba to be a terrorist organisation based in Muridke near Lahore, Pakistan, partially in reaction to the massacre.
