= Deepak Summanwar =

Former Indian Army officer

Lieutenant General Deepak Summanwar UYSM, AVSM, VSM, MinD, CC
- Born: 14 March 1947 (age 79); Mumbai, INDIA
- Education: The Doon School
- Military career
- Allegiance: India
- Branch: Indian Army
- Service years: 40
- Rank: Lieutenant General
- Unit: Rajputana Rifles
- Conflicts: Kargil War, Indo-Pakistani War of 1971
- Awards: Uttam Yudh Seva Medal

Lt. Gen. Deepak Harishchandra Summanwar UYSM is a retired Indian Army officer who fought the Kargil War in 1999 and was awarded the Uttam Yudh Seva Medal.

He commanded an Infantry Brigade in Rajasthan and a Mountain Brigade on the Line of Control in J&K from where his brigade took part in operations at Kargil in 1999. He has commanded a division in Kargil during Operation Parakram. He has received awards for gallantry and distinguished service, Mention in Despatch in Indo Pak War 1971, Chief of the Army Staff Commendation Card for Operation Pawan in Sri Lanka, Vishisht Seva Medal for Command of Brigade in Kargil Operation and Uttam Yudh Seva Medal for Operation Parakram in Kargil. General Summanwar has held a number of instructional and staff appointments to include an instructional tenure at the National Defence Academy, Brigade Major in a Counter Insurgency area, Colonel General Staff in HQ Indian Peace Keeping Force in Sri Lanka, Director, Military Operations Directorate at Army Headquarters and Additional Director General at the Perspective Planning Directorate.
