= 2002 Eastern Mediterranean event =

Atmospheric explosion above the Mediterranean Sea, caused by small asteroid

2002 Eastern Mediterranean event

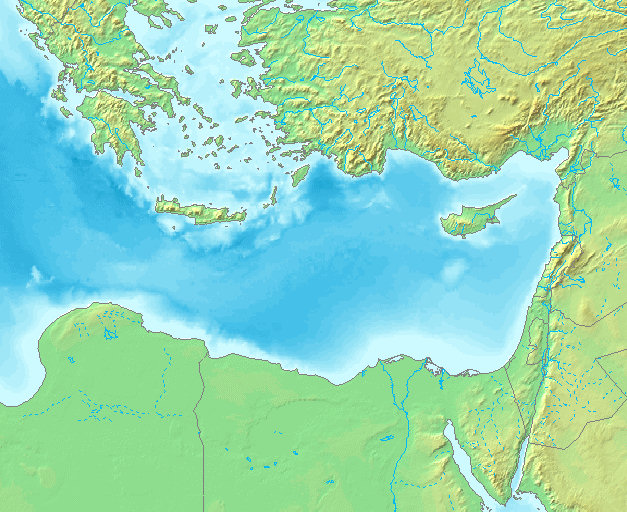
The Mediterranean sea

The 2002 Eastern Mediterranean Event was a high-energy upper atmosphere explosion over the Mediterranean Sea, around 34°N 21°E (between Libya and Crete) on June 6, 2002. This explosion, similar in power to a small atomic bomb, has been related to a small asteroid undetected while approaching Earth. The object disintegrated as a meteor air burst over the sea, and no meteorite fragments were recovered.

The event occurred during the 2001–2002 India–Pakistan standoff, and there were concerns by General Simon Worden of the U.S. Air Force that if the upper atmosphere explosion had occurred closer to Pakistan or India, it could have sparked a nuclear war between the two countries.

== See also ==
- Impact event
- Near-Earth object
- Potentially hazardous asteroid
- Vela incident
