= Raudin Anwar =

Indonesian diplomat (born 1960)

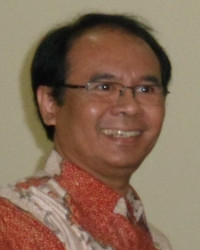

Ambassador of Indonesia to Libya
- In office 24 December 2013 – November 2017
- President: Susilo Bambang Yudhoyono; Joko Widodo
- Preceded by: Sanusi
- Succeeded by: vacant

Personal details
- Born: June 6, 1960 (age 66) Cirebon, West Java, Indonesia
- Education: Gadjah Mada University (S.H.); University of Melbourne (LL.M.)

Raudin Anwar (born 6 June 1960) is an Indonesian retired diplomat specializing in international law. He spent most of his career in the foreign ministry's international treaties directorate general, including assignments abroad in Washington, Port Moresby, London, and Canberra. His last assignment was as ambassador to Libya from 2013 to 2017.

== Early life and education ==
Born on 6 June 1960 in Cirebon, Raudin graduated from the Gadjah Mada University with a bachelor's degree in law in 1986. During his career in the foreign ministry, Raudin received master of laws from the University of Melbourne in 1992.

== Diplomatic career ==
Raudin joined the foreign ministry upon graduating from the Gadjah Mada University and started his service within the foreign department's research agency in 1986. Upon receiving his master's degree, by 1993 he received his maiden overseas assignment to the consular section of the embassy of Indonesia in Washington, D.C. with the rank of third secretary. He was later promoted to the diplomatic rank of second secretary, and served until 1996.

Raudin returned to the foreign ministry with his appointment as the chief of international trade traties from 1997 to 1999. Raudin then served at the consular section of the embassy in Port Moresby from 1999 to 2001 and the political affairs section of the embassy in London from 1999 to 2001, all with the rank of first secretary. From 2003 to 2006, Raudin became the deputy director (chief of subdirectorate) for economic, trade, investment, finance, and environment treaties. He was sent to the embassy in Canberra as minister counsellor for information, social, and cultural affairs in 2006 before returning to Indonesia four years later to serve as the secretary of the directorate general of international treaties and law on 3 September 2010.

On 4 September 2013, Raudin was nominated by President Susilo Bambang Yudhoyono as ambassador to Libya. During his assessment by the House of Representative's first commission on 17 September, Raudin was criticized by commission member Nurul Anwar on his lack of understanding on the present situation in Libya and described his answers to the commission's inquiries as "unsatisfactory". Nurul later delivered his concerns as a recommendation to the central government. Despite the concerns, he was sworn in as ambassador on 24 December 2013.

During his tenure, Raudin oversaw the evacuation of Indonesians from Libya following the commencement of the Libyan civil war in May 2014, with him personally accompanying the third wave of evacuation. Due to the deteriorating security condition in Libya, on 3 August 2014 the government decided to move out Raudin and the embassy's staff, as well as their families from Tripoli to Djerba in Tunisia. However, the embassy remained open with a routinely rotated staff.

Following the improvement of security conditions in Libya in late 2017, Raudin paid a visit to the Misrata Free Trade Zone in October 2017, exploring its potentials to cooperate with Indonesia's Batam Free Trade Zone. Raudin announced his departure to the Chairman of the Presidential Council of Libya Fayez al-Sarraj, foreign minister Mohamed Taha Siala, and the Speaker of the Libyan House of Representatives Aguila Saleh Issa. In a meeting with the latter on 20 November 2017, he stated his plans to send Indonesian nurses to Libyan hospitals on the condition of improved security in Libya, clear employment contracts, defined work hours, salary, and accommodation. Upon his departure from Libya, the post he left remained vacant, and as of 2025 the embassy is headed by a chargé d'affaires ad interim.

After the end of his ambassadorial term in Libya, Raudin served as a senior diplomat within the foreign ministry. In 2018, he led a high-level delegation from Indonesia for an economic diplomacy roadshow to Karachi. The delegates met with the Karachi Chamber of Commerce and Industry and Korangi Association of Trade and Industry to discuss trade and investment opportunities between Pakistan and Indonesia.
