= Point 5310 =

Mountain peak in Ladakh

Coordinates: 34°48′06″N 76°28′52″E

Point 5310 is a mountain peak in the Chorbat La area in the vicinity of Kargil. It is located at a distance of about one kilometre on the Pakistani side of the LoC. The peak located on the Pakistani side of LoC was captured in an operation by troops of the Indian Army on April 8, 2000. Two Indian soldiers including a JCO Subedar Bharnam Singh were killed by an avalanche during the operation. The operation was carried out by the 14th battalion of the Sikh Regiment.

The peak is of strategic importance because it enables the Indian Army to tactically control 12 square kilometres of Pakistani territory in Karubar bowl. Domination of this area also threatened the Pakistani posts opposite Turtok Sector from the rear. Some analysts see it as an Indian retaliation for the capture of Point 5353 on the LoC by Pakistani troops.
