= Dassault Mirage III =

French supersonic fighter/interceptor aircraft

Mirage III
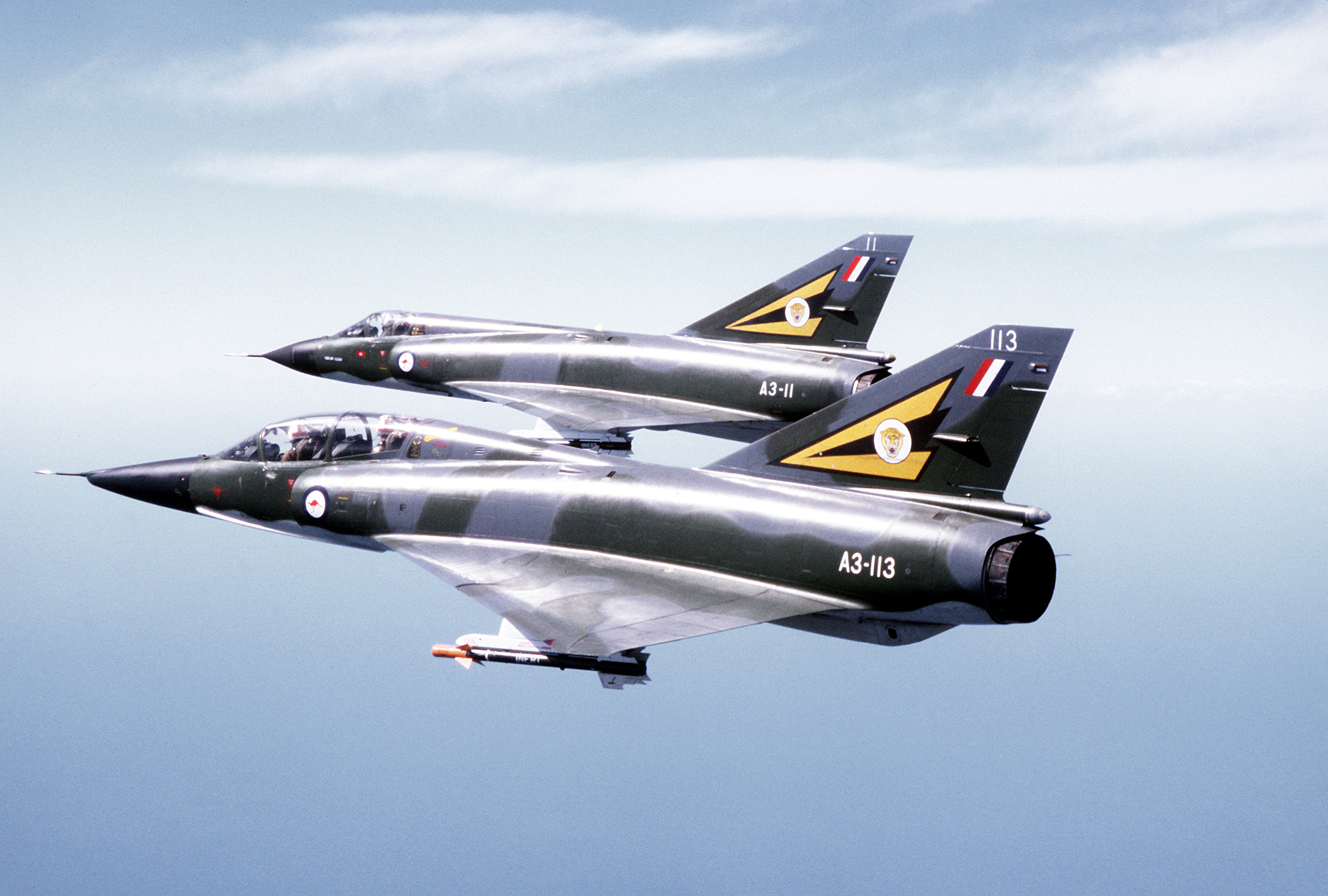
- Two Mirage III of the Royal Australian Air Force (a Mirage IIID twin-seater in front of a Mirage III O single-seater)

General information
- Type: Interceptor aircraft
- National origin: France
- Manufacturer: Dassault Aviation
- Status: In service with the Pakistan Air Force
- Primary users: French Air Force (historical) Royal Australian Air Force (historical); Pakistan Air Force; Israeli Air Force (historical)
- Number built: 1,422

History
- Introduction date: 1961
- First flight: 17 November 1956
- Variants: Dassault Mirage IIIV; Dassault Mirage 5 Atlas Cheetah

The Dassault Mirage III (French pronunciation: [miʁaʒ]) is a family of single/dual-seat, single-engine, fighter aircraft developed and manufactured by French aircraft company Dassault Aviation. It was the first Western European combat aircraft to exceed Mach 2 in horizontal flight, which it achieved on 24 October 1958.

In 1952, the French government issued its specification, calling for a lightweight, all-weather interceptor. Amongst the respondents were Dassault with their design, initially known as the Mirage I. Following favourable flight testing held over the course of 1954, in which speeds of up to Mach 1.6 were attained, it was decided that a larger follow-on aircraft would be required to bear the necessary equipment and payloads. An enlarged Mirage II proposal was considered, as well as MD 610 Cavalier (3 versions), but was discarded in favour of a further-developed design, powered by the newly developed Snecma Atar afterburning turbojet engine, designated as the Mirage III. In October 1960, the first major production model, designated as the Mirage IIIC, performed its maiden flight. Initial operational deliveries of this model commenced in July 1961; a total of 95 Mirage IIICs were obtained by the French Air Force (Armée de l'Air, AdA). The Mirage IIIC was rapidly followed by numerous other variants.

The Mirage III was produced in large numbers for both the French Air Force and a wide number of export customers. Prominent overseas operators of the fighter included Argentina, Australia, South Africa, Pakistan and Israel, as well as a number of non-aligned nations. Often considered to be a second-generation fighter aircraft, the Mirage III experienced a lengthy service life with several of these operators; for some time, the type remained a fairly maneuverable aircraft and an effective opponent when engaged in close-range dogfighting. During its service with the French Air Force, the Mirage III was normally armed with assorted air-to-ground ordnance or R.550 Magic air-to-air missiles. Its design proved to be relatively versatile, allowing the fighter model to be readily adapted to serve in a variety of roles, including trainer, reconnaissance and ground-attack versions, along with several more extensive derivatives of the aircraft, including the Dassault Mirage 5, Dassault Mirage IIIV and Atlas Cheetah. Some operators have undertaken extensive modification and upgrade programmes, such as Project ROSE of the Pakistan Air Force.

The Mirage III has been used in active combat roles in multiple conflicts by a number of operators. The Israeli Air Force was perhaps the most prolific operator of the fighter outside of France itself; Israel deployed their Mirage IIIs in both the Six-Day War, where it was used as both an air superiority and strike aircraft, and the Yom Kippur War, during which it was used exclusively in air-to-air combat in conjunction with the IAI Nesher, an Israeli-built derivative of the Mirage 5. Ace of aces Giora Epstein achieved all of his kills flying either the Mirage III or the Nesher. During the South African Border War, the Mirage III formed the bulk of the South African Air Force's fleet, comprising a cluster of Mirage IIICZ interceptors, Mirage IIIEZ fighter-bombers and Mirage IIIRZ reconnaissance fighters; following the introduction of the newer Mirage F1, the type was dedicated to secondary roles in the conflict, such as daytime interception, base security, reconnaissance and training. The Argentine Air Force used the Mirage IIIEA during the Falklands War, but their lack of an aerial refueling capability limited the aircraft's usefulness in the conflict. Even using drop tanks, the Mirages only had an endurance of five minutes within the combat area around the British fleet.

== Development ==
=== Origins ===
The Mirage III family has its origins within a series of studies conducted by the French Defence Ministry which had commenced in 1952. At the time, several nations had taken an interest in the prospects of a light fighter, which had been motivated by combat experiences acquired during the Korean War, specifically the Soviet-built Mikoyan-Gurevich MiG-15 jet-propelled fighter aircraft which had drawn considerable attention internationally. Western nations were keen to explore the performance of a relatively uncomplicated and heavily armed jet-powered swept wing fighter, inspired by the rapid advances in aircraft capabilities that had been made by the Soviet Union. France was one of the quickest governments of several nations, including the United Kingdom (resulting in the Folland Gnat), the United States (leading to the Douglas A-4 Skyhawk), and Italy (which became the Fiat G.91), to embark on encouraging the development of such an aircraft.

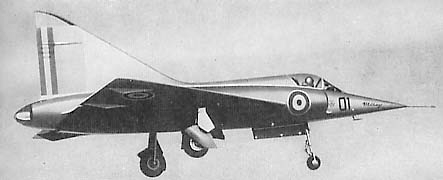
The tailless 1955 Mystère Delta delta-wing prototype with the very large vertical stabilizer and no horizontal stabilizer and no flaps

In 1952, the French government issued its specification, calling for a lightweight, all-weather interceptor, capable of climbing to 18,000 meters (59,100 ft) in 6 minutes along with the ability to reach Mach 1.3 in level flight. Three separate French manufacturers decided to respond to the specification, these being Dassault Aviation, Sud-Est, and Sud-Ouest, offering the MD.550 Mystère Delta, SE.212 Durandal and SO.9000 Trident, respectively. Dassault's submission, which became known as the MD.550 Mystère Delta, was a diminutive and sleek-appearing aircraft that was principally powered by a pair of 9.61 kN (2,160 lbf) Armstrong Siddeley MD30R Viper afterburning turbojet engines (built under licence by Dassault); atypically, the design also featured provisions for the installation of a secondary propulsion system in the form of a SEPR-built 66 liquid-fuel rocket engine, capable of providing boost thrust of 4.7 kN (1,100 lbf).

The basic layout of the MD.550 Mystère Delta featured a tailless delta configuration, possessing a 5 per cent thickness (ratio of airfoil thickness to length) and 60° sweep, complete with a large vertical stabilizer and rudder. However, the tailless delta configuration imposed a number of limitations, including the lack of a horizontal stabilizer, which meant that conventional flaps could not be used; this resulted in a relatively long takeoff run and a high landing speed.> The delta wing itself limits maneuverability and suffers from buffeting at low altitude due to the large wing area and resulting low wing loading. However, the delta is a simple design, easy to construct and relatively robust while providing generous amounts of internal volume in the wing for fuel and being capable of achieving high speeds when flown in a straight line.

"If it were not for the clumsy way in which you tackle things in Britain, you could have made the Mirage yourself."

— Marcel Dassault, founder of Dassault Aviation

British aviation author Derek Wood observed that there was "a striking resemblance" between the MD.550 Delta and the British Fairey Delta 2, an experimental aircraft that first flew on 6 October 1954, and which set a new world speed record on 1 March 1956. During the latter stages of testing of the Fairy Delta 2 in October and November 1956, the FD2 performed 47 low level supersonic test flights from Cazaux Air Base, Bordeaux, in France. Dassault engineers observed these trials and obtained additional data on the performance and flight characteristics of delta wing aircraft. The Delta 2 confirmed Dassault's theories, and provided additional supporting evidence for the viability of the Mirage III development.

=== Flight testing ===
On 25 June 1955, the first prototype of the MD.550 Mystère Delta, without afterburning engines or rocket motor and with an unusually large vertical stabilizer, conducted its maiden flight. In this configuration, it was able to attain a maximum speed of Mach 1.15. Following initial flights, it received a redesign that involved the vertical stabilizer being reduced in size along with the installation of afterburners and a rocket motor; it was at this point that the aircraft was renamed as the Mirage I. In late 1954, the prototype attained a recorded speed of Mach 1.3 in level flight without rocket assistance, as well as reaching Mach 1.6 when using the rocket motor. According to aviation author John F. Brindley, testing of the Mirage I and prototypes of the rival Trident and Durandal designs had demonstrated the limitations of the light fighter concept, namely limitations on both endurance and equipment/payload capacity. The small size of the Mirage I restricted its armament to a single air-to-air missile, and it was decided during flight trials that the aircraft was too small for the carriage of a useful armament. Following the completion of flying trials, the Mirage I prototype was eventually scrapped.

Dassault was keen to produce a successor to the Mirage I prototype; at one point, the firm was considering the production of an enlarged version, known as the Mirage II, which would have been furnished with a pair of Turbomeca Gabizo turbojet engines. However, the Mirage II ultimately remained unbuilt as it was bypassed for an even more ambitious design, being 30 per cent heavier than the original Mirage I, powered by the newly developed Snecma Atar afterburning turbojet engine, capable of generating up to 43.2 kN (9,700 lbf) of thrust. The Atar was an axial-flow turbojet design, having been derived from the German Second World War-era BMW 003 engine. The new Atar-equipped fighter design received the name Mirage III. There was also an even larger heavy fighter design drafted, referred to as the Mirage IV. A decisive factor had been interest from the French military, who had made its favour for the Mirage III proposal known to the company.

The Mirage III incorporated various new design principles, such as the transonic area rule concept, where changes to an aircraft's cross-section were made as gradual as possible, resulting in the famous "wasp waist" configuration of many supersonic fighters. Similar to its Mirage I predecessor, the Mirage III had provision for a booster rocket engine. On 17 November 1956, the prototype Mirage III perform its first flight. During its 10th flight, it was recorded as having attained a speed of Mach 1.52 at one point. During the course of the flight test programme, the prototype was fitted with a pair of manually operated intake half-cone shock diffusers, known as souris ("mice"), which could be moved forward as the Mach number increased. This achieved a reduction in inlet pressure losses by ensuring the fuselage oblique shock remained outside the intake lip. Reportedly, their addition enabled an increased speed of Mach 1.65 to be reached, while use of the supplemental SEPR 66 rocket (as fitted to the Mirage I) had allowed for a speed of Mach 1.8 to be reached in September 1957.

The success of the Mirage III prototype resulted in an order for 10 pre-production Mirage IIIA fighters. Although the type had initially conceived of as an interceptor, the batch had been ordered with the intention of using them to develop the type for additional roles as well. The Mirage IIIA were almost 2 meters longer than the Mirage III prototype, had an enlarged wing of 17.3 per cent greater area, a chord reduced to 4.5 per cent, and an Atar 09B turbojet capable of generating afterburning thrust of up to 58.9 kN (13,200 lbf). The SEPR 841 rocket engine was also retained. The Mirage IIIA was also fitted with a Thomson-CSF-built Cyrano Ibis air intercept radar, operational-standard avionics, and a drag chute to shorten its landing roll.

In May 1958, the first Mirage IIIA conducted its first flight. On 24 October of that year, this aircraft achieved a top speed of Mach 2.2 during one of its test flights, thus becoming the first Western European aircraft to exceed Mach 2 in level flight. In December 1959, the tenth and final Mirage IIIA was rolled out; the last six pre-production aircraft were largely representative of the subsequent initial production standard. The test regime involved a wide variety of tasks, including the evaluation of the newer SEPR 841 rocket motor, various underwing drop tanks, and other major systems. One Mirage IIIA was powered by a Rolls-Royce Avon 67 engine capable of generating 71.1 kN (16,000 lbf) of thrust, to serve as a test model for Australian evaluation, which was given the Mirage IIIO designation. This variant flew in February 1961, but the Avon powerplant was ultimately not adopted on production aircraft.

=== Mirage IIIC and Mirage IIIB ===
The first major production model, the Mirage IIIC, first flew in October 1960. The IIIC was largely similar to the earlier IIIA, being less than a half meter longer and featuring a full operational fit. The Mirage IIIC was a single-seat interceptor, with an Atar 09B turbojet engine, featuring an eyelid type variable exhaust. The Mirage IIIC was armed with twin 30 mm DEFA cannon fitted in the belly with the gun ports under the air intakes. Early production Mirage IIICs had three stores pylons, one under the fuselage and one under each wing; another outboard pylon was soon added to each wing, for a total of five, excluding a sleek supersonic tank which also had bomb-carrying capacity. The outboard pylon was intended to carry an AIM-9B Sidewinder air-to-air missile, later replaced by the Matra R.550 Magic and was also armed with the radar guided Matra R.530 Missile on the center line pylon.

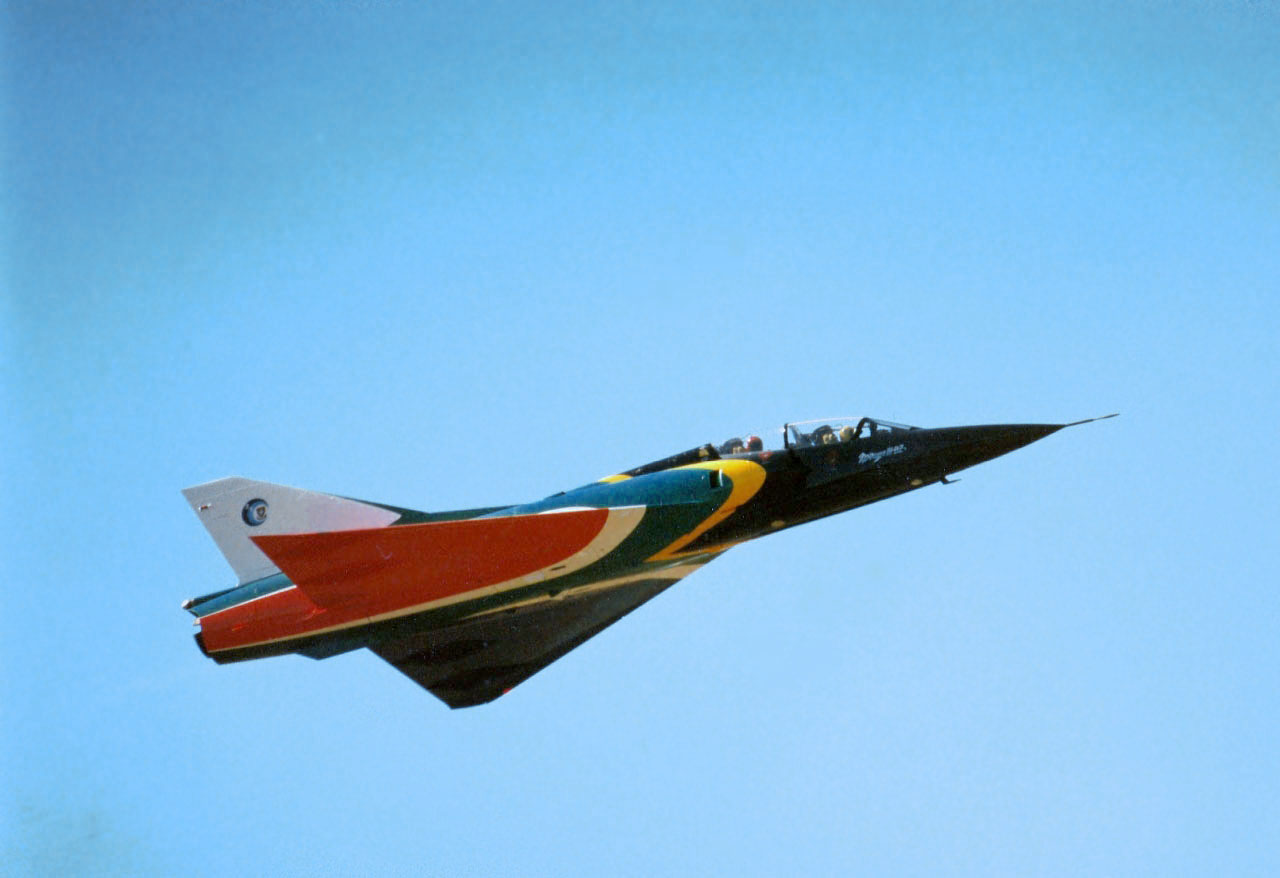
South African Air Force Mirage IIIBZ

A total of 95 Mirage IIICs were obtained by the French Air Force (Armée de l'Air, AdA), with initial operational deliveries in July 1961. The Mirage IIIC remained in service with the AdA until 1988.

The Armée de l'Air also placed an order for a two-seat Mirage IIIB operational trainer. Performing its first flight on 21 October 1959, it was developed in parallel with the Mirage IIIC. The fuselage was stretched about a meter (3 ft 3.5 in), while both cannons were removed to accommodate the second seat. The IIIB lacked radar and provision for the SEPR rocket was also deleted, although it could carry external stores if desired. The AdA ordered 63 Mirage IIIBs (including the prototype), including five Mirage IIIB-1 trials aircraft, ten Mirage IIIB-2(RV) inflight refueling trainers with dummy nose probes, used for training Mirage IVA bomber pilots, and 20 Mirage IIIBEs, with the engine and some other features of the multi-role Mirage IIIE. One Mirage IIIB was fitted with a fly-by-wire flight control system in the mid-1970s and redesignated Mirage IIIB-SV (Stabilité Variable), it was used as a testbed for the system in the later Mirage 2000.

=== Mirage IIIE ===
While the initial Mirage IIIC model was heading towards quantity production, Dassault turned its attention towards the development of a multirole/strike variant of the aircraft. Efforts in this direction would eventually materialized in the form of the single-seat Mirage IIIE; a two-seat trainer variant of the aircraft was also developed, designated as the Mirage IIID. On 5 April 1961, the first of a batch of three prototypes performed its first flight.

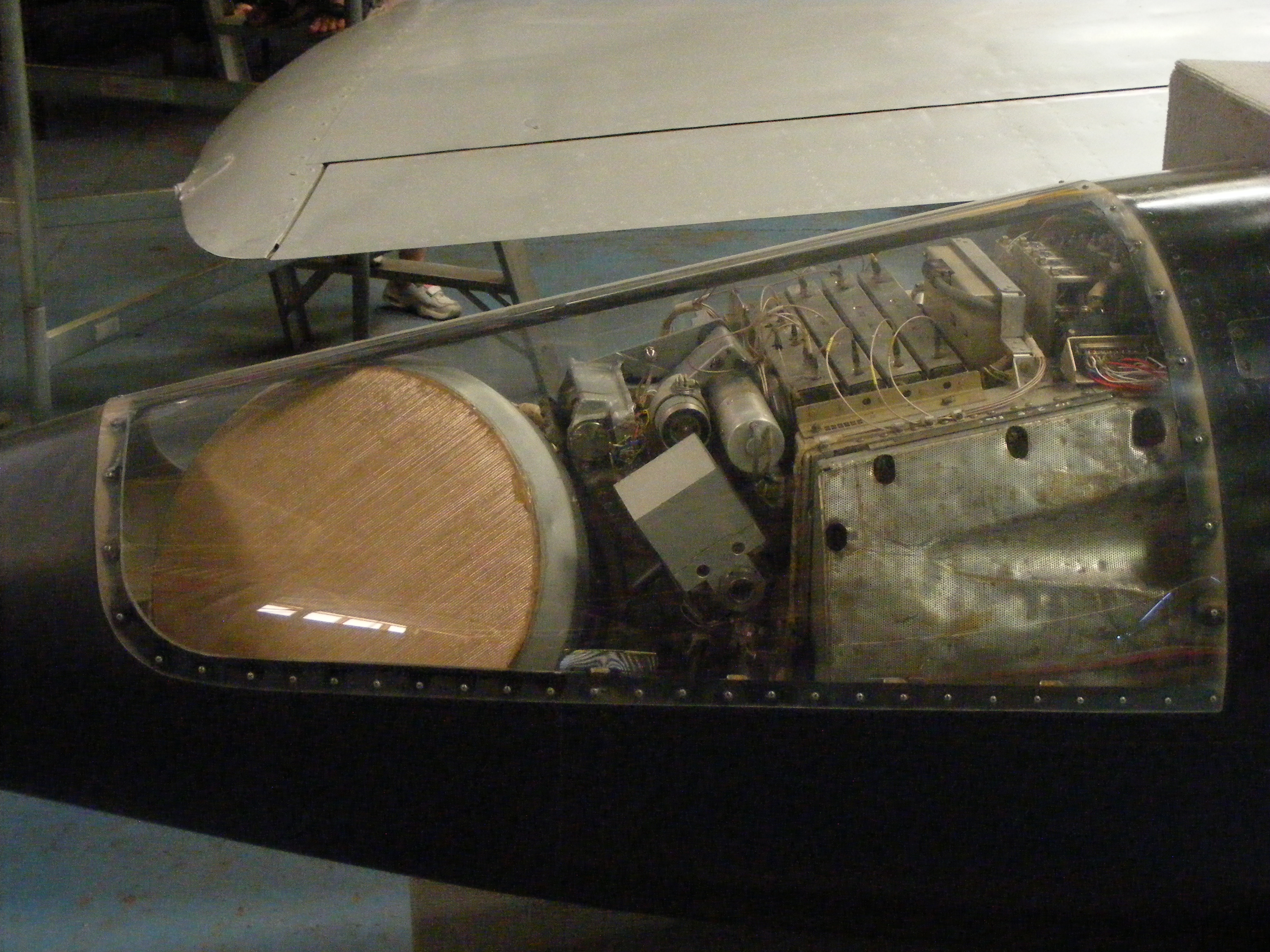
Cutaway view of the Cyrano radar system

The Mirage IIIE considerably differed from the earlier Mirage IIIC interceptor. In terms of its airframe, the aircraft possessed a 300 mm (12 in) forward fuselage extension, which had been made to increase the size of the avionics bay, located directly behind the cockpit. The stretch had also enabled its fuel capacity to be expanded, which had been deemed necessary after several pilots had criticized the Mirage IIIC for having been quite limited in terms of its range.

Many Mirage IIIEs were fitted with a British-built Marconi continuous-wave Doppler navigation radar radome on the bottom of the fuselage, underneath the cockpit; in contrast, none of the Mirage IIICs were provided with this apparatus. A similar inconsistent variation was the presence or absence of a high frequency (HF) antenna fitted as a forward extension to the vertical tailplane; on some Mirages, the leading edge of the tailplane was a straight line, while on those with the HF antenna the leading edge had a sloping extension forward. The extension appears to have been generally standard on production Mirage IIIAs and Mirage IIICs, but only appeared in some of the Mirage IIIE's export versions. The Mirage IIIE featured Thomson-CSF Cyrano II dual mode air / ground radar; a radar warning receiver (RWR) system with the antennas mounted in the vertical tailplane; and an Atar 09C engine, the latter being equipped with a petal-style variable exhaust.

On 14 January 1964, the first production Mirage IIIE was delivered to the AdA, over time, 192 aircraft were eventually delivered to that service. By 1971, this variant had become the most widely exported version of the aircraft.

=== Mirage IIIR ===
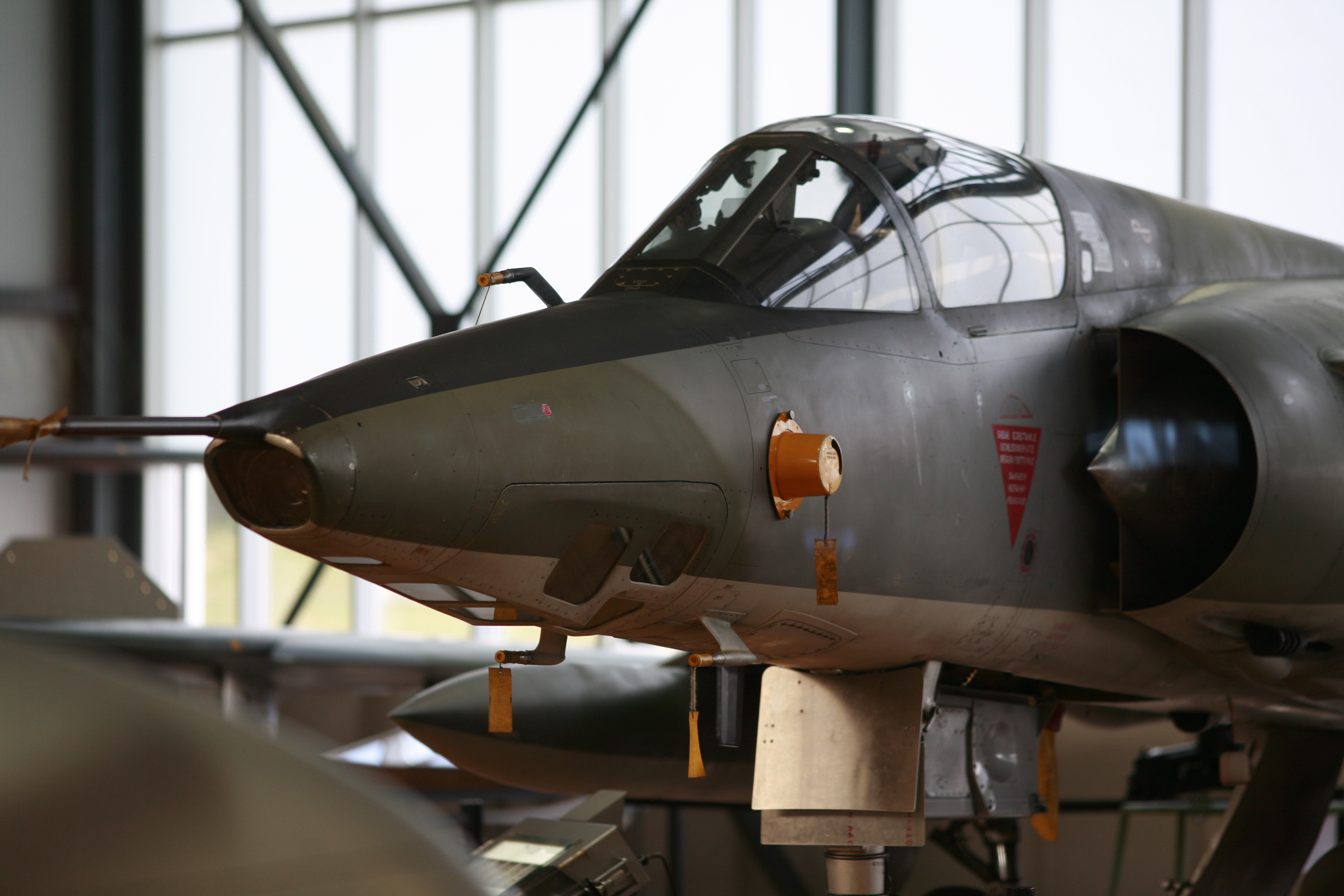
Nose of a Mirage IIIRS: Thinner than the fighter version, this nose has several glass apertures for medium-format cameras.

A number of dedicated reconnaissance variants of the Mirage III were developed and produced, grouped under the general designation of Mirage IIIR. These aircraft possessed a Mirage IIIE airframe but were furnished with avionics from the Mirage IIIC variant, along with a purpose-developed camera nose, which internally accommodated up to five OMERA cameras. On this variant, the radar system was removed due to a lack of available space in the nose, however, the aircraft retained the twin DEFA cannons and all compatibility with its external stores. An improved variant, designated as the Mirage IIIRD, was also developed later on; it was essentially a Mirage IIIR outfitted with an extra panoramic camera at the most forward nose position, along with the adoption of the Doppler radar and other avionics from the Mirage IIIE, and provision for carrying an infrared linescan or a Side looking airborne radar in an under-fuselage pod.

In response to interest expressed by the AdA in a reconnaissance model of the Mirage design, Dassault proceeded with the development of a pair of prototypes. On 31 October 1961, the first of these prototypes conducted its maiden flight; on 1 February 1963, it was followed by the first production-standard aircraft of the model. The AdA opted to obtain a total of 50 production Mirage IIIRs; the service later ordered a further 20 Mirage IIIRDs as well. Several export customers, most notably Switzerland, also chose to procure reconnaissance Mirages. The Mirage IIIR preceded the Mirage IIIE in operational introduction.

== Exports and license production ==
=== Exports ===
The largest export customers for Mirage IIICs built in France were Israel, their principal variant being the Mirage IIICJ, and South Africa, the bulk of their fleet being the Mirage IIICZ. Some export customers obtained the Mirage IIIB, with designations only changed to provide a country code, such as: Mirage IIIDA for Argentina, Mirage IIIDBR for Brazil, Mirage IIIBJ for Israel, Mirage IIIBL for Lebanon, Mirage IIIDP for Pakistan, Mirage IIIBZ and Mirage IIIDZ and Mirage IIID2Z for South Africa, Mirage IIIDE for Spain and Mirage IIIDV for Venezuela.

After Israeli success with the Mirage IIIC, scoring kills against Syrian Mikoyan-Gurevich MiG-17s and MiG-21 aircraft and then achieving a formidable victory against Egypt, Jordan, and Syria in the Six-Day War of June 1967, the Mirage III's earned a combat-proven service history. This and low cost made it a popular export success. According to Brindley, a key element of the Mirage III's export success was the extensive support given to Dassault by the French government; he has claimed that the state would often commence negotiations without involving or informing Dassault at all until a later stage.

A good number of Mirage IIIEs were built for export as well, being purchased in small numbers by Argentina as the Mirage IIIEA, Brazil as the Mirage IIIEBR, Lebanon as the Mirage IIIEL, Pakistan as the Mirage IIIEP, South Africa as the Mirage IIIEZ, Spain as the Mirage IIIEE, and Venezuela as the Mirage IIIEV, with a list of subvariant designations, with minor variations in equipment fit. Dassault believed the customer was always right, and was happy to accommodate changes in equipment fit as customer needs and budget required.

Some customers obtained the two-seat Mirage IIIBE under the general designation Mirage IIID, though the trainers were generally similar to the Mirage IIIBE except for minor changes in equipment fit. In some cases they were identical, since two surplus AdA Mirage IIIBEs were sold to Brazil under the designation Mirage IIIBBR, and three were similarly sold to Egypt under the designation Mirage 5SDD. New-build exports of this type included aircraft sold to Abu Dhabi, Argentina, Brazil, Chile, Colombia, Egypt, Gabon, Libya, Pakistan, Peru, Spain, Venezuela, and Zaire.

During the 1960s, the Soviet Union was alleged to have been engaged in attempts at conducting industrial espionage that targeted Dassault and specifically the Mirage III. In one widely reported incident, a pilot of the Lebanese Air Force was approached by Soviet agents, who offered him a bribe to fly one of the nation's 14 Mirage IIIs directly to Soviet territory; Lebanese counter-intelligence was notified of the attempt by the pilot. Diplomatically, France was protective of the fighter, often forbidding nations from re-exporting their Mirage IIIs to third parties without their consent under the threat of a prospective embargo.

Export versions of the Mirage IIIR were built for Pakistan as the Mirage IIIRP and Mirage IIIRP2, and South Africa as the Mirage IIIRZ and Mirage IIIR2Z with an Atar 9K-50 jet engine. Export versions of the IIIR recce aircraft were purchased by Abu Dhabi, Belgium, Colombia, Egypt, Libya, Pakistan, and South Africa. Some export Mirage IIIRDs were fitted with British Vinten cameras, not OMERA cameras. Most of the Belgian aircraft were built locally.

==== Israel ====
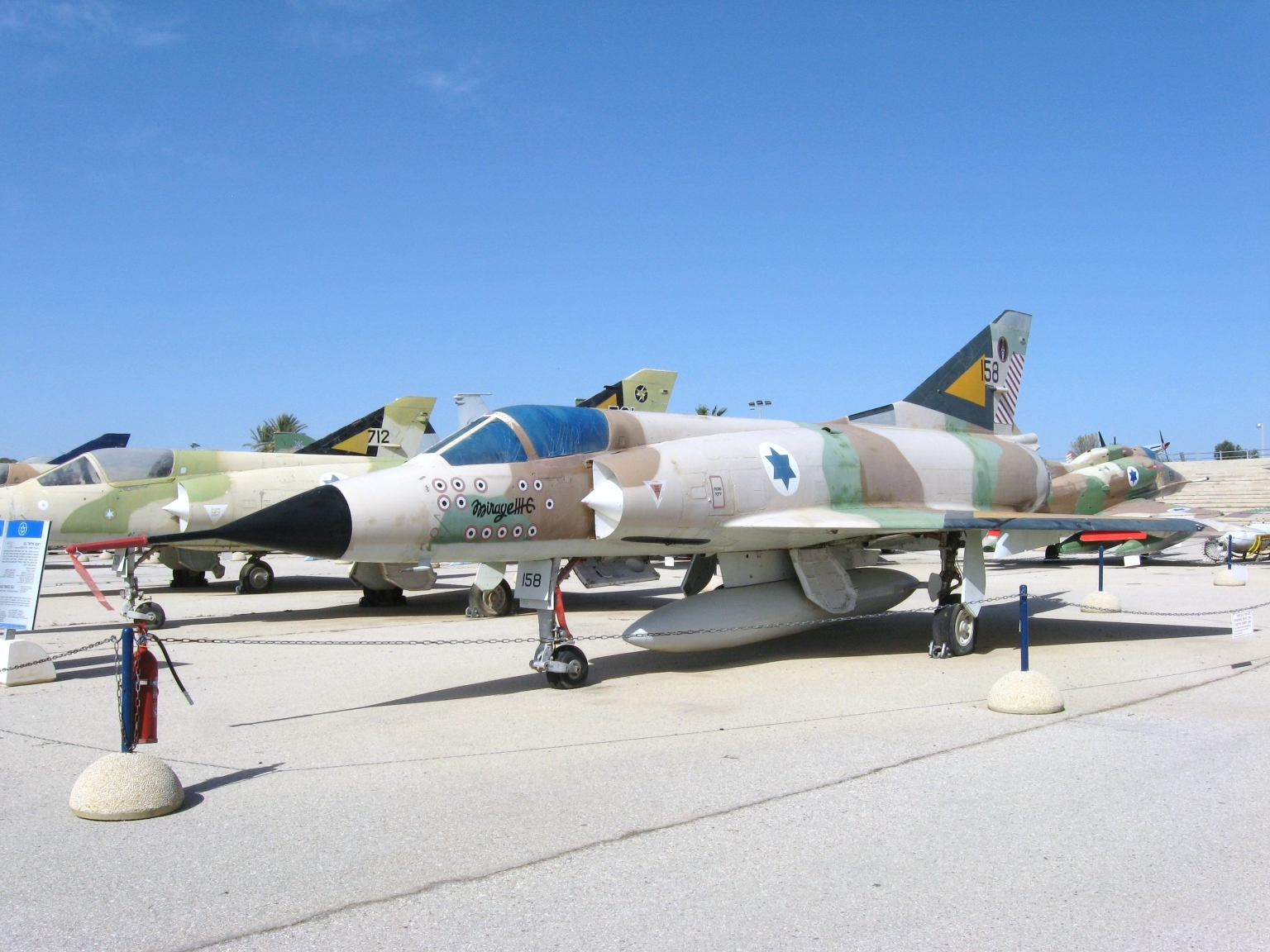
Mirage IIICJ at the Israeli Air Force Museum (13 victory markings)

The Israeli Air Force (IAF) purchased three variants of the Mirage III:

- 70 Mirage IIICJ single-seat fighters, received between April 1962 and July 1964.
- Two Mirage IIIRJ single-seat photo-reconnaissance aircraft, received in March 1964.
- Four Mirage IIIBJ two-seat combat trainers, three received in 1966 and one in 1968.

Initial Israeli operations were conducted in a close cooperative relationship with both Dassault and France itself, the former sharing large amounts of operational data and experience with the other parties. However, Israel was forced into updating its own Mirages when France imposed an arms embargo on the region after the 1967 Six-Day War. For many years, official military relations did not exist between France and Israel, however, spare components remained available. The result of these troubles was the development of Israel Aircraft Industries' Nesher fighter, which was based on the Mirage 5. Nevertheless, Mirage IIIB upgrades up to and including a full Kfir-type conversion have also been made available to third parties by IAI.

==== South Africa ====
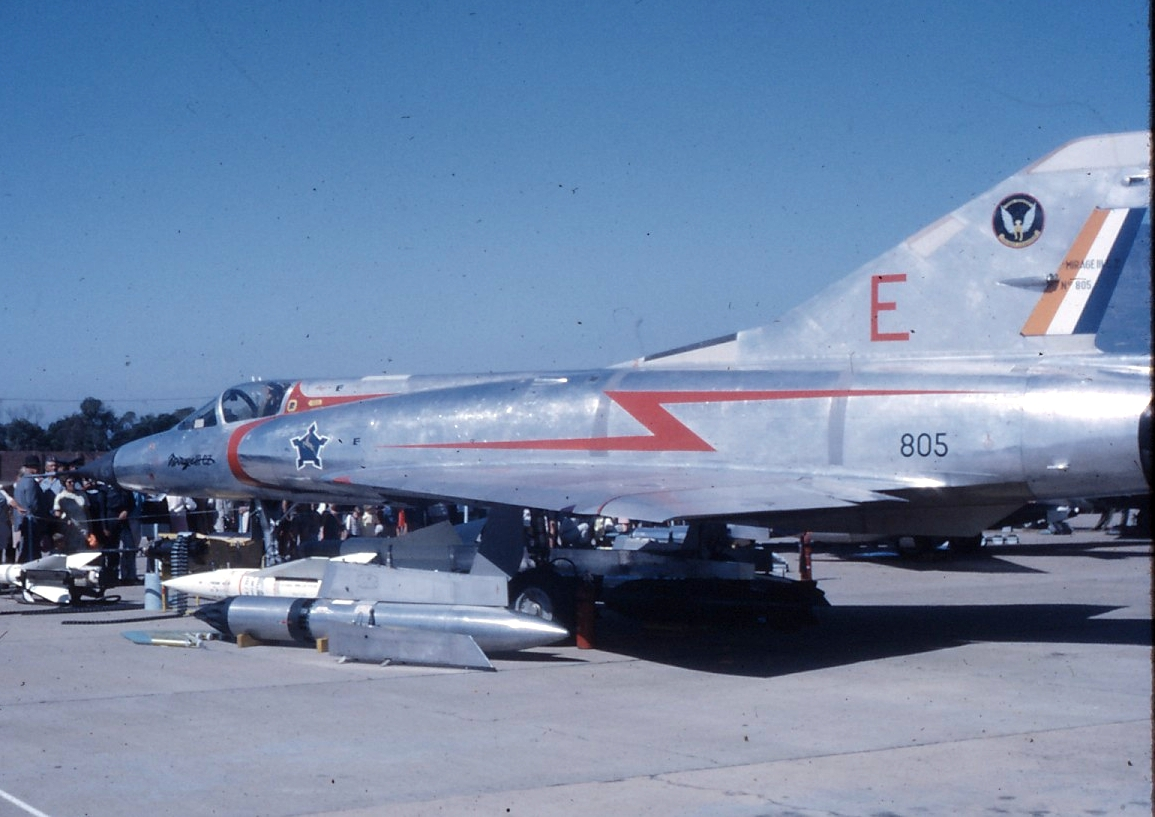
A South African Mirage IIICZ in 1970

South Africa was amongst the earliest export customers for the Mirage III, having initially ordered a batch of 15 Mirage IIIC for low-level ground attack operations, for which they were armed with the Nord Aviation AS-20, along with three Mirage IIIBZ two-seater trainers. Further aircraft were ordered, including a batch of 16 Mirage IIIEs, three Mirage IIID two-seaters and four Mirage IIIR photo-reconnaissance aircraft. During the early 1970s, South Africa reportedly held negotiations with Dassault with the aim of securing a licence to produce either the Mirage III, the Mirage 5 and the Mirage F1.

However, much like Israel, South Africa was similarly isolated by a French arms embargo after the passage of United Nations Security Council Resolution 418 in November 1977. The South African Air Force launched an ambitious rebuild programme for its Mirage III fleet, soliciting Israeli technical assistance to convert existing airframes into the Atlas Cheetah. Fixed foreplanes distinguish the Cheetah from its Mirage predecessor, and an extended nose, probably inspired by the IAI Kfir, houses a modified electronics suite, including radar. Built in single-seat, two-seat interceptor, and two-seat combat trainer versions, the Atlas Cheetah entered service in 1987 during the South African Border War. Armament consists of Denel Kukri or Darter heat-seeking air-to-air missiles, the targeting of which was aided by a pilot's helmet mounted sight.

==== Pakistan ====
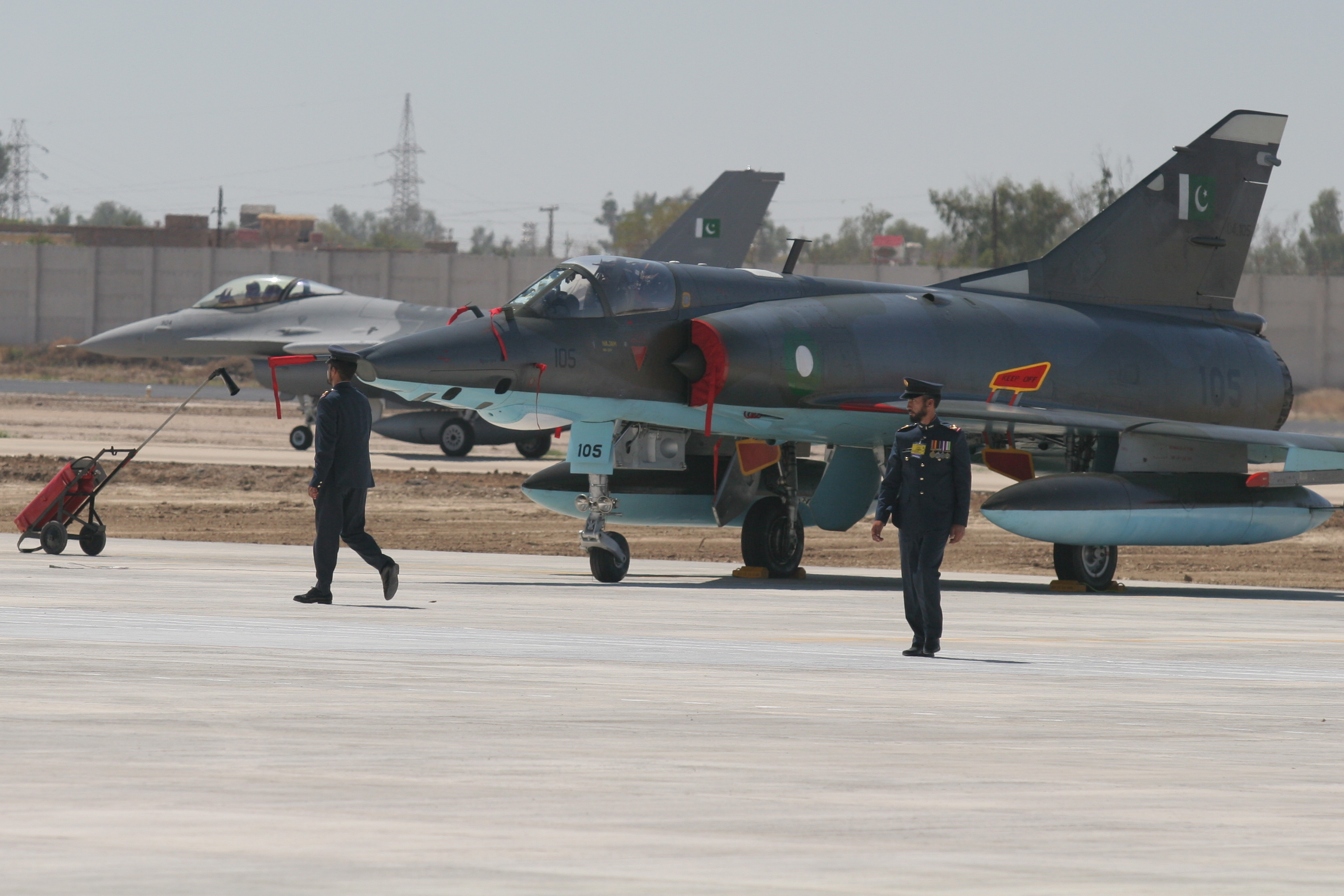
A Pakistani Mirage-IIIE reconnaissance variant with a Pakistani F-16C in the background in 2011

In 1967, Pakistan opted to purchase an initial batch of 18 Mirage IIIEPs, 3 Mirage IIIDPs and 3 Mirage IIIRPs from France. Over the course of time, the Pakistan Air Force (PAF) inducted large numbers of new and secondhand Mirages IIIs and Mirage 5s spanning multiple variants. In 1977 and 1978, an additional 10 new Mirage IIIRP2s were delivered.

Perhaps the most notable PAF unit equipped with the type has been No. 5 Squadron, which was fully operational by the Indo-Pakistani War of 1971. During the conflict, while flying out from bases in Sargodha and Mianwali, the Mirage III was used to conduct ground attacks against Indian military units and targets of interest. The PAF denied that any Mirage was lost. It was also confirmed by France that no fighter jet was missing from the total of 23 (a single aircraft had already been lost before the war).

In 1991, because French production of the Mirage III and most spare parts had ceased, Pakistan acquired 50 Australian-built Mirages, which had been retired by the Royal Australian Air Force in 1988: 42 examples of the Mirage IIIO and eight twin-seat IIID. A further five incomplete aircraft were also obtained from the RAAF for cannibalized spare parts. Eight of the ex-RAAF Mirages entered service with the PAF immediately, while another 33 were upgraded under a PAF project known as ROSE I ("Retrofit of Strike Element"), with new equipment including: head-up display (HUD), HOTAS controls, multi-function display (MFD), radar altimeter, nav/attack system (manufactured by SAGEM), inertial navigation and GPS systems, radar warning receiver (RWR), an electronic countermeasures (ECM) suite, decoy flares and chaff dispenser. In 1999, multi-mode FIAR Grifo M3 radar was installed in the PAF Mirages.

Ten Lebanese Air Force aircraft were purchased in 2000 and in 2003 15 Mirage IIIEEs and 5 Mirage IIIDEs were obtained from the Spanish Air Force for cannibalized spare parts.

From 2011, the PAF Mirage fleet was modified to carry Hatf-VIII (Ra'ad) cruise missiles and to accommodate aerial refueling probes of South African origin (presumably similar to those installed on the Atlas Cheetah). Subsequently, these aircraft have been modified to accept additional equipment and munitions, such as Chinese PL-12 air-to-air missiles.

In 2019, the PAF was reported to be in negotiation with Egypt for purchase of 30 Mirages.

=== License production ===
Variants of the Mirage IIIE were built under license in both Australia (as the IIIO) by GAF, and Switzerland (as the IIIS) by F+W Emmen.

==== Australia ====
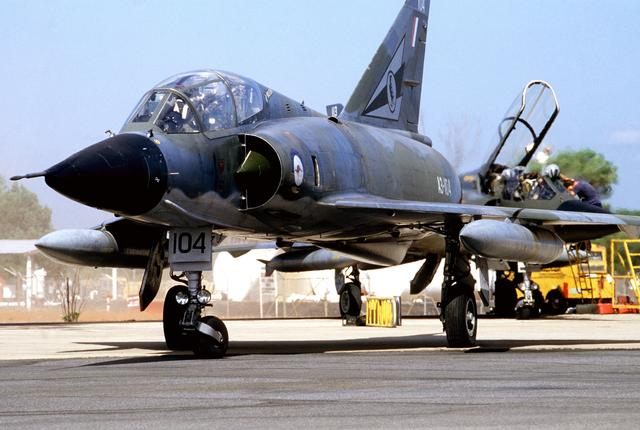
An Australian Mirage IIID in 1988

Australia first showed an official interest in replacing its CAC Sabre with the Mirage III in 1960, and initially considered a variant powered by a licence-built variant of the Rolls-Royce Avon turbojet (used by the CAC Sabre). While an experimental Avon-powered Mirage III was built as a prototype and flown in trials, it did not result in use of the Avon by a production variant.

The Australian government decided that the Royal Australian Air Force (RAAF) would receive a variant based on the Mirage IIIE and powered by the SNECMA Atar engine, built under license by Government Aircraft Factories (GAF) at Fishermans Bend, Melbourne. Known as the Mirage IIIO or GAF Mirage, the Australian variant differed from the Mirage IIIE mainly in its avionics. The other major Australian aircraft manufacturer at the time, the Commonwealth Aircraft Corporation (CAC), also based in Melbourne, was also involved in the project, producing the Atar engine under licence.

Initially, Dassault provided a pair of pattern aircraft, the first of these flying in March 1963, which were transported to Australia and used to aid technicians at GAF in establishing their own assembly line for the type. GAF produced three variants: the Mirage IIIO(F), which was an interceptor, the Mirage IIIO(A), a surface attack aircraft and the twin seat Mirage IIIO(D), a lead-in fighter trainer. GAF completed 48 Mirage IIIO(F), 50 Mirage IIIO(A) and 16 Mirage IIIO(D) aircraft.

Between 1967 and 1979, all the surviving Mirage IIIO(F) aircraft were converted to the Mirage IIIO(A) standard, which reconfigured them from the interceptor role to perform ground attack and aerial reconnaissance missions instead. In 1988, the Mirage III was finally withdrawn from RAAF service; 50 of the surviving fighters were exported to Pakistan in 1990. Several examples are preserved in museums around Australia; at least one of these is reportedly under restoration to a taxiable condition.

==== Switzerland ====
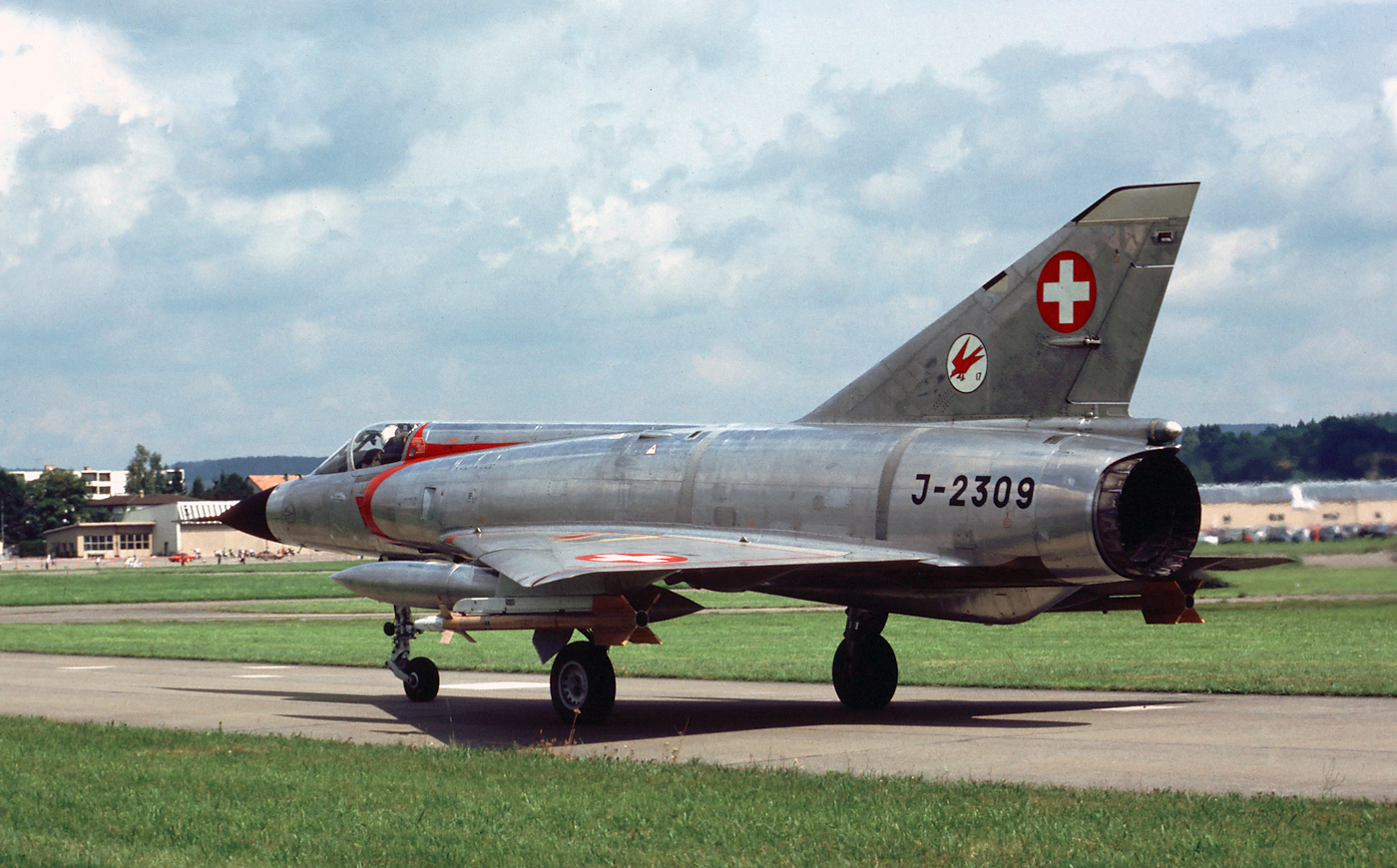
A Mirage IIIS in 1984

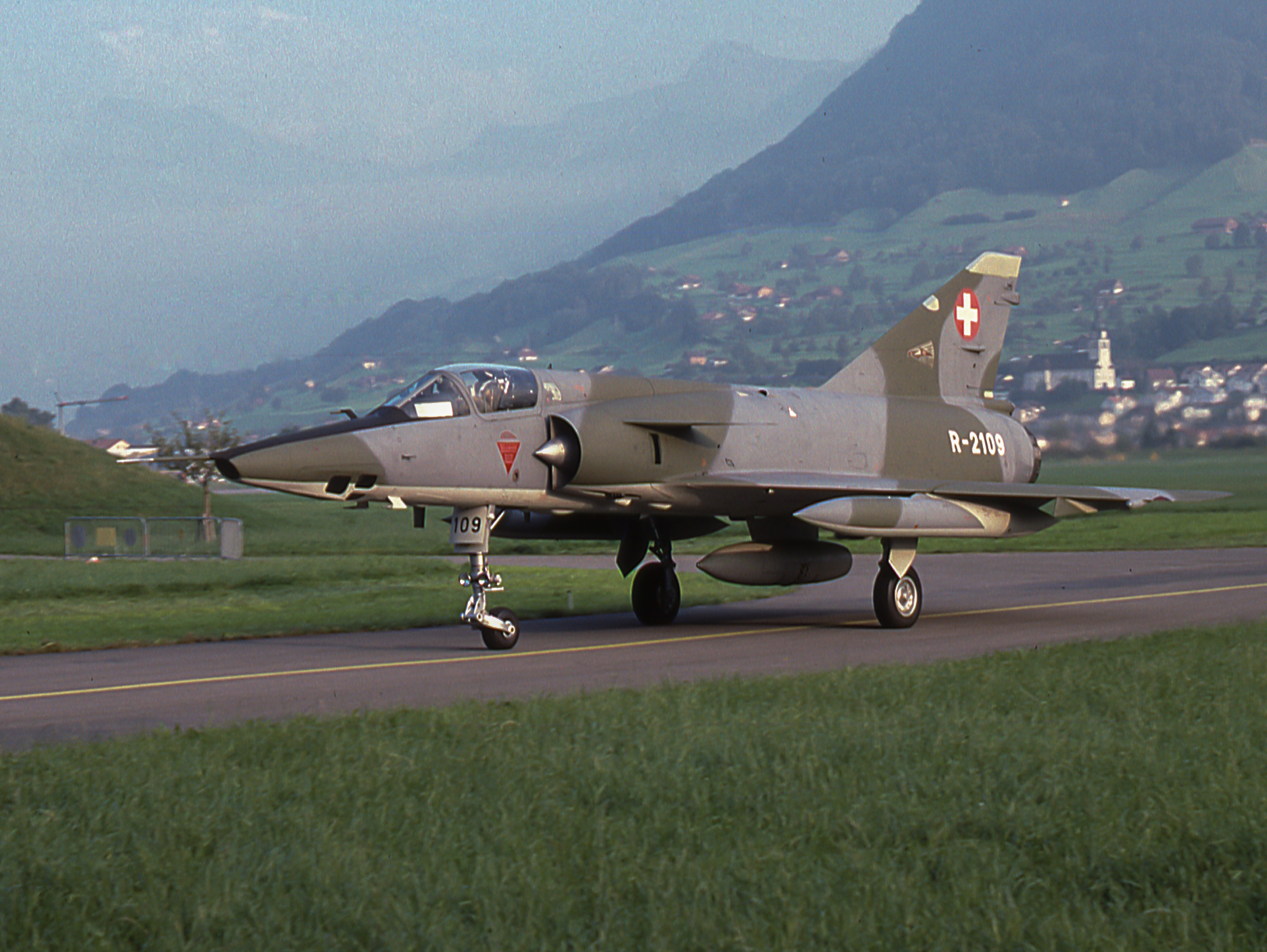
A Mirage IIIRS in 1998

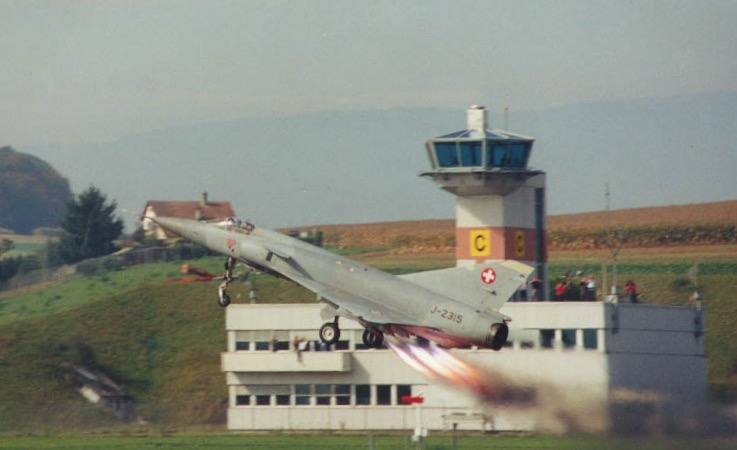
Swiss Air Force Mirage IIIS JATO (jet-assisted take-off)

In 1961, Switzerland purchased a single Mirage IIIC from France for use as a development aircraft to support the nation's intentions to domestically produce 100 Mirage III fighters for the Swiss Air Force. Accordingly, Mirages were manufactured in Switzerland by F+W Emmen (today RUAG, the federal government aircraft factory in Emmen) under the Mirage IIIS designation. The Mirage IIIS was intended to perform the attack, interception, and reconnaissance missions in a single model. However, the venture suffered considerable cost overruns, mainly due to Swiss-mandated customisations and features, this was compounded by a lack of financial oversight, controversy over the manufacturing cost ultimately cumulated in the so-called "Mirage affair" and the resignation of several officials. It became clear that a single model was not capable of the performance desires; thus only 36 Mirage IIIS interceptors and 18 Mirage IIIRS reconnaissance aircraft were eventually produced by F+W Emmen.

The Mirage IIIS was with considerably strengthened wings, airframe, and undercarriage as the Swiss Air Force had required robustness comparable to that of carrier-based planes. The reinforced airframes enabled aircraft to be moved by lifting them with a crane (hence the airframes also being fitted with four lifting points, retractable nosecones and lengthened nosewheel legs), as the aircraft caverns in the mountains that Swiss Air Force uses as bunkers offer very little space to maneuver parked aircraft. Another benefit of the strengthened frames was the enabling of JATO-assisted takeoffs, giving the type a short takeoff and landing (STOL) capability.

Other major differences were present on the Swiss-built interceptors. It was furnished with new American-sourced avionics along with a different cockpit design, including a Hughes Aircraft Company-built TARAN-18 radar system and could armed with the AIM-4 Falcon air-to-air missile (Swiss designation of the SAAB Licence built Robot 27 (Rb27), which is similar to the Hughes AIM-26 "Falcon"). In addition, the Mirage IIIS had the wiring to carry a Swiss-built or French-built nuclear bomb. In the event, the programme to produce a Swiss nuclear bomb was stopped in the pre-production stage and Switzerland chose not to purchase such weapons from France either. The Mirage IIIRS could also carry a centerline pod for conducting photo reconnaissance missions, as well as an integral fuel tank underneath the aft belly; this tank could carry a smaller fuel load, but also allowed for a rear-facing film camera to also be added. When fitted with the reconnaissance pod, supersonic performance was severely diminished. The Mirage IIIS could be optionally fitted with a SEPR (Société d'Etudes pour la Propulsion par Réaction) 844 rocket engine.

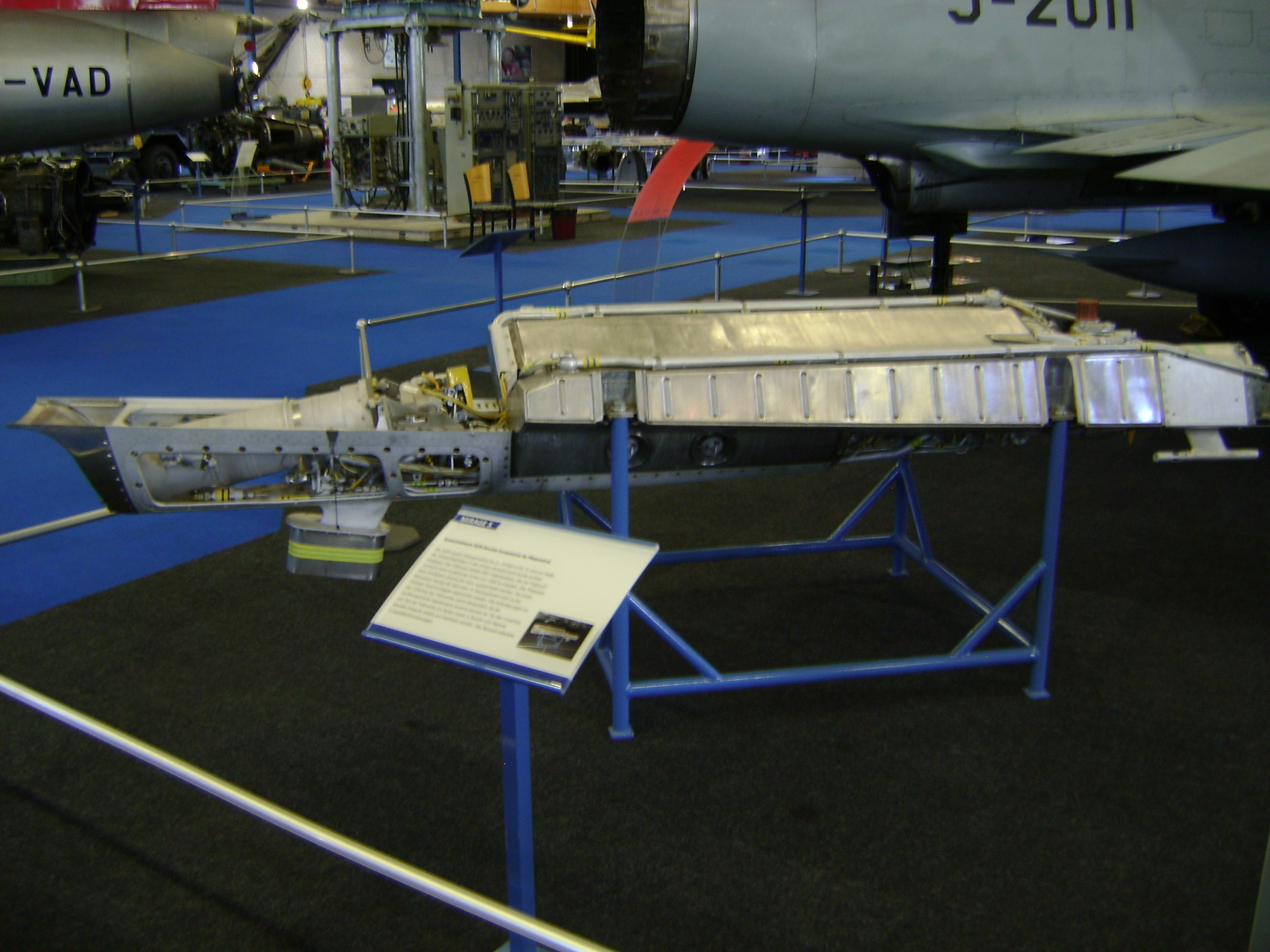
SEPR at the Flieger-Flab-Museum

In 1967, the Mirage IIIS entered operational service with the Swiss Air Force; the Mirage IIIRS followed two years later. During their service life, Swiss Mirages received several upgrades, including the installation of a Martin-Baker Mk 6 ejection seat, a radar warning receiver, and a TRACOR AN/ALE-40 chaff/flare dispenser positioned at the back under the rear of the fuselage. Starting in 1988, canards and strakes designed by FFA and F+W in cooperation with Dassault, and produced in Switzerland, were fitted to the type. In 1999, Switzerland phased out the last of its Mirage IIIS fleet; the remaining Mirage IIIRS, BS and DS variants were taken out of service in 2003.

== Operational history ==
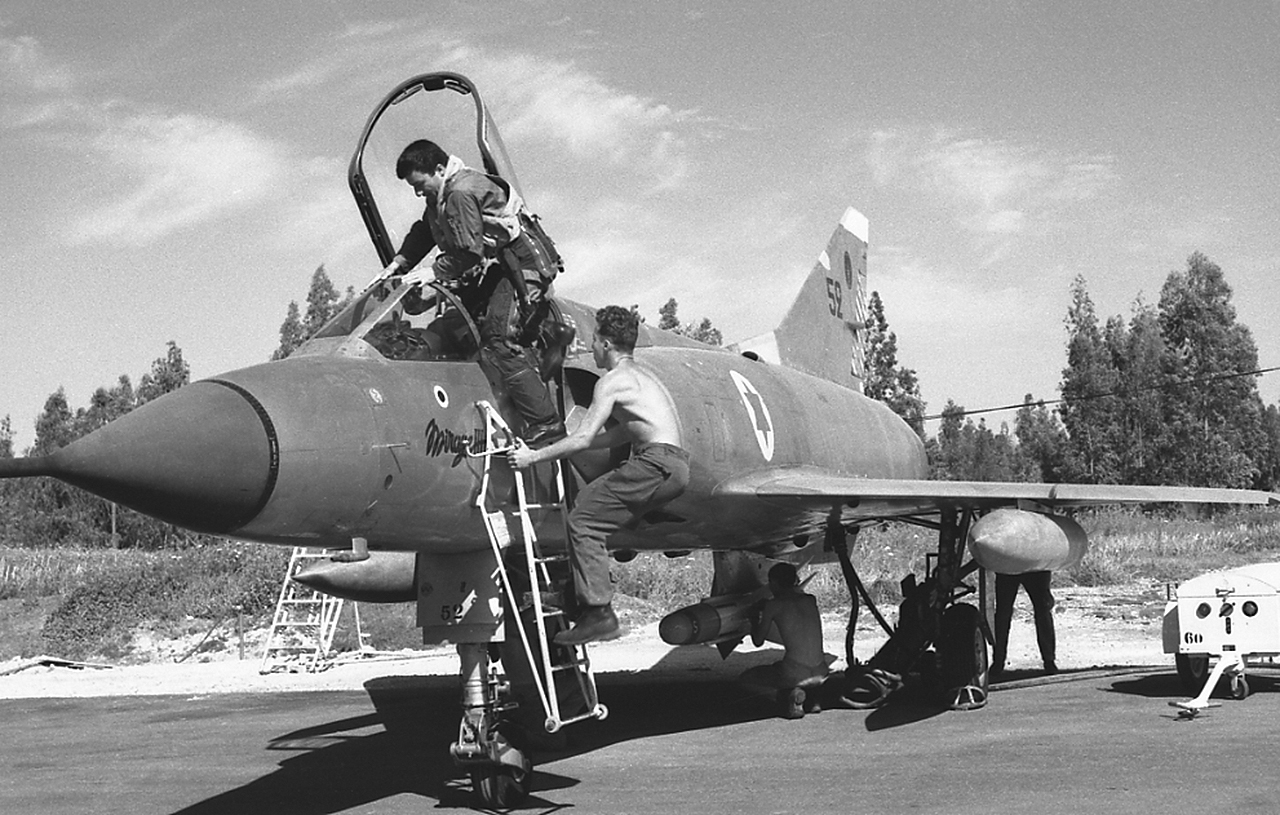
A Mirage IIICJ armed with a Matra R530 in 1967

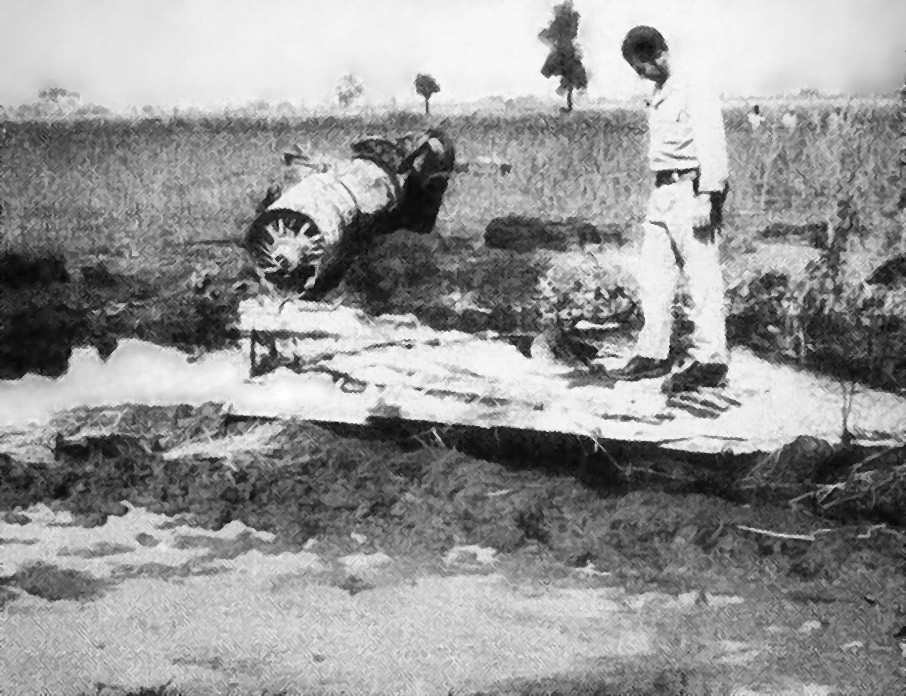
Wreckage of downed Israeli Mirage in the Yom Kippur War 1973

=== Israel ===
On 29 November 1966, the pilot of an Israeli Air Force Dassault Mirage III shot down two Egyptian MiG-19s which were trying to intercept an Israeli reconnaissance Piper J-3 Cub in Israeli airspace. The first MiG was destroyed with a R.530 radar guided missile fired from less than a mile away, marking the first aerial kill for the French-made missile. The second MiG-19 was dispatched with cannon fire.

==== Six-Day War ====
During the Six-Day War, fought between 5 and 10 June 1967, Israel deployed a small detachment of 12 Mirages (comprising 4 permanently in the air and 8 at a high state of readiness on the ground) to defend the skies of Israel against attacks by hostile bombers, virtually all other Mirages were equipped with bombs and deployed on bombing raids against Arab air bases. Reportedly, the Mirage's performance as a bomber was modest at best, perhaps due to its limited payload capacity. During the first day of combat, a total of 6 MiG fighters were claimed to have been shot down by Mirage pilots. During the following days, Israeli Mirages typically performed as fighters; out of a claimed total of 58 Arab aircraft shot down in air combat during the conflict, 48 were accounted for by Mirage pilots.

==== Yom Kippur War ====
During the 1973 Yom Kippur War, the Mirage fleet was solely engaged in air-to-air operations. ACIG.org claims that at least 26 Mirages and Neshers were lost in air-to-air combat during the war. Contrary to these claims, formal Israeli sources claim that only five Israeli Air Force aircraft were shot down in air-to-air dogfights. In comparison, 106 Syrian and Egyptian aircraft were claimed shot down by Israeli Mirage IIICJ planes, and another 140 aircraft were claimed by the Nesher derivative. Israeli Air Force pilot Giora Epstein, "ace of aces" of modern, supersonic fighter jets, achieved all of his victories flying either the Mirage IIICJ or the IAI Nesher (an Israeli derivative of the Mirage 5, which were in turn developed from the Mirage III).

=== South Africa ===
The South African Air Force inducted its first Mirage IIICZ interceptors between December 1962 and March 1964, taking delivery of 16. South Africa continued acquiring Mirage IIIs, with three BZ trainers between 1962 and 1964, and four IIIRZs (Reconnaissance variants) between 1966 and 1967. The interceptors formed No.2 Squadron "Cheetahs" in 1962.

==== Border War ====
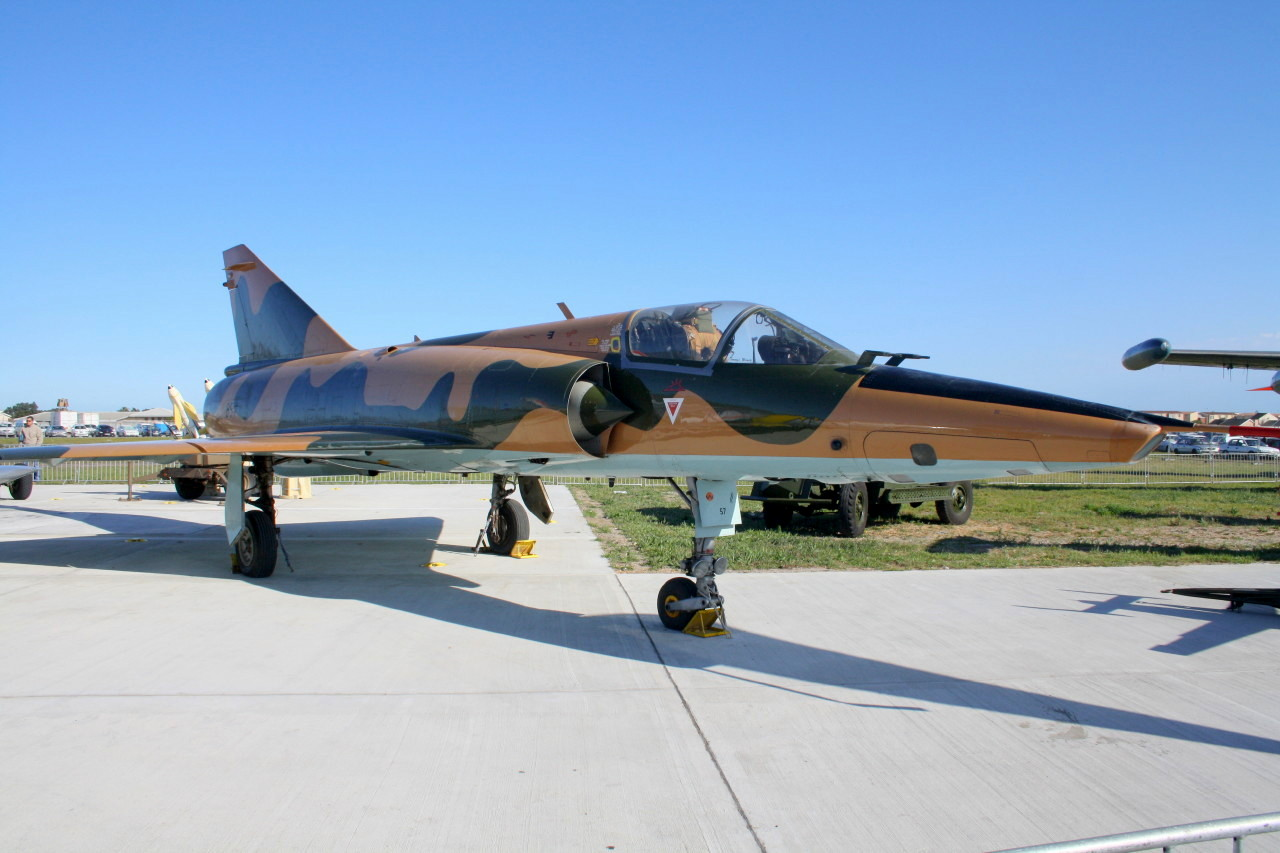
Mirage IIIR2Z at the SAAF Museum

During the South African Border War, the South African Air Force operated a force of 16 Mirage IIICZ interceptors, 17 Mirage IIIEZ multirole fighter-bombers, and 4 Mirage IIIRZ reconnaissance fighters, which were typically flown from bases in South-West Africa. Despite being recognised as an exceptional dogfighter, the Mirage III was often criticised for lacking the range to make it effective over long distances, such as during strike operations against People's Liberation Army of Namibia (PLAN) insurgents based in neighbouring Angola. South African pilots also found the high-nosed, delta-winged Mirage III relatively difficult to land on the rudimentary airstrips near the operational area.

Over time, the Mirage IIIs were eventually assigned to 2 Squadron, SAAF, and restricted to the secondary roles of daytime interception, training exercises, and photographic reconnaissance missions following the adoption of the newer Mirage F1. The mediocre performance of the fighter's Cyrano II radar effectively precluded the type from conducting nighttime operations, as well as during challenging weather conditions. By the late 1980s, the Mirage IIICZ was considered so obsolete that it was utilised only for base security. Nevertheless, the Mirage IIIRZ continued to be deployed for photo reconnaissance missions over Angolan targets, as the SAAF had only one other aircraft equipped for this role, the even more antiquated English Electric Canberra.

During reconnaissance missions, SAAF Mirage IIIRZs would often fly at extremely low altitudes, sometimes as low as fifty feet (15 metres); briefly prior to reaching their intended targets, the aircraft would enter a rapid climb from which photographs would be taken before turning away. During the Battle of Cuito Cuanavale, Mirage IIIRZ pilots carried out mock sorties over enemy positions in Xangongo and Humbe in an attempt to provoke a response from Cuban or Angolan MiG-21s and MiG-23s, which would then be engaged by accompanying SAAF Mirage F1AZs.

=== Pakistan ===
==== Indo-Pakistani War of 1971 ====
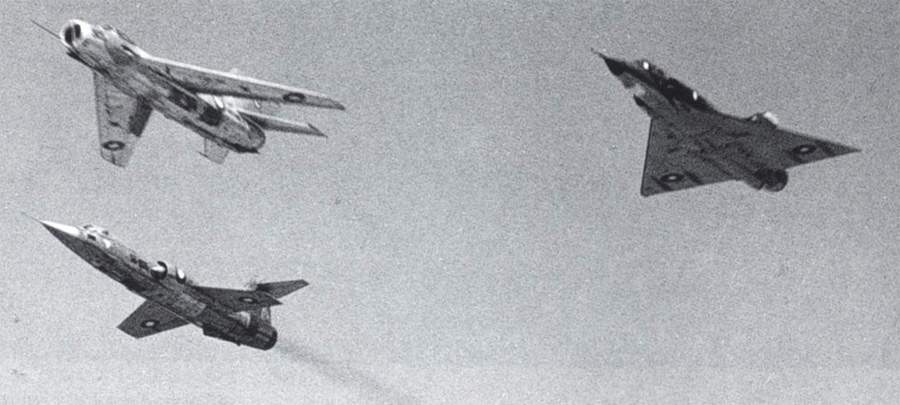
PAF's Dassault Mirage-III, Shenyang F-6 and Lockheed F-104 flying in a 3-ship formation

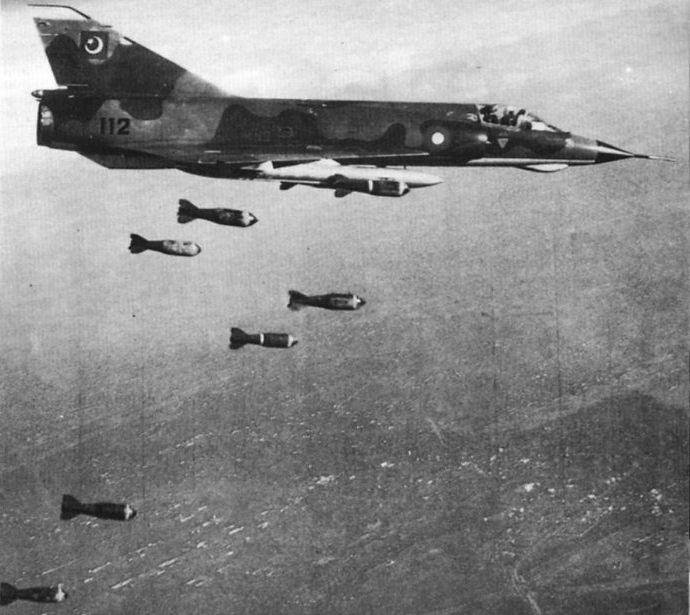
Dassault Mirage-IIIEP of the PAF dropping M117 dumb bombs over Thal ranges during ISAC-1974

During the 1971 War, PAF Mirages were used in preemptive strikes and also claimed the first aerial victories against Indian Airforce Canberra bombers and reconnaissance aircraft in the Western Front, along with Su-7 and Hawker Hunter. During the war, the Mirages were frequently employed for Airfield Interdiction, strike, as well as CAP missions; whereas the tasks of Close Air Support and Battlefield Air Interdiction were taken up by F-86 Sabres and Shenyang F-6P aircraft.

==== Afghanistan and the War on Terror ====
The Mirage III was a major frontline combat type for the PAF in the 1970s and 1980s, and consequently took up early combat air patrols near the Afghan border following the Soviet Invasion of Afghanistan. During these Missions, two MiG-21s of the DRAAF were claimed by Mirage IIIs of No. 5 Squadron but these kills were never confirmed (16 April 1986 and 10 May 1986). They were also allegedly deployed against the Northern Alliance, and during the war on terror, Pakistani Mirage-III & Mirage-V jets were deployed in the Khyber Pakhtunkhwa province after the spillover of militants from Afghanistan in 2001. They performed Close Air Support missions throughout the conflict.

==== Operation Swift Retort ====
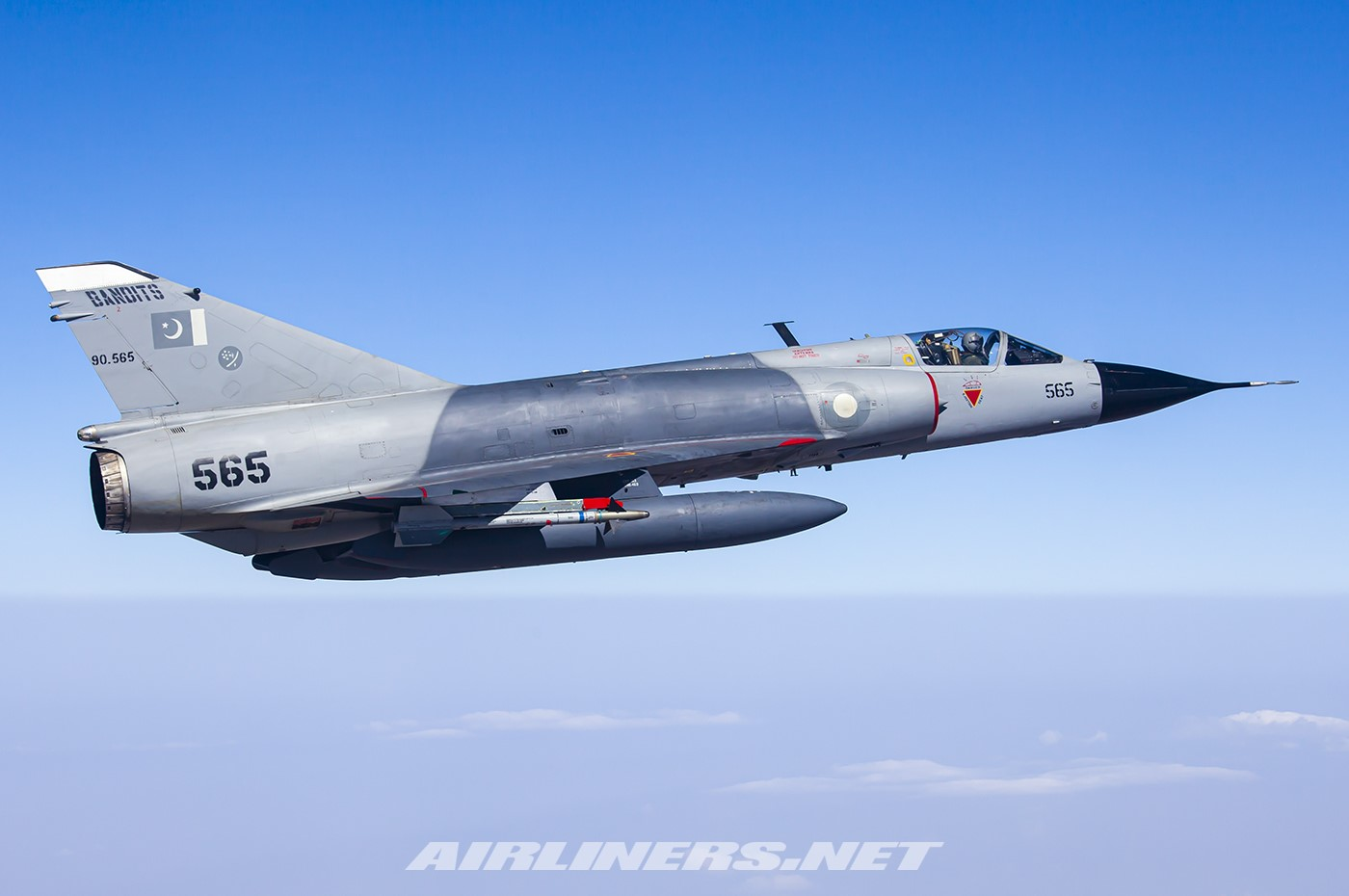
Mirage IIIEA of No. 7 Squadron PAF in 2013

In February 2019, the Indian Air Force bombed an alleged terrorist training camp in Balakot after violating Pakistan's airspace. In response, then Prime Minister Imran Khan ordered the Pakistan Air Force to perform retaliatory airstrikes on Indian military installations at Indian Administered Kashmir. The retaliatory airstrikes were codenamed "Operation Swift Retort" and for this purpose, Two Dassault Mirage 5PAs armed with H-4 SOW glide bombs and two dual seat Mirage IIIDAs from the No. 15 Squadron were deployed for the mission. In the early hours of 27 February, the Mirages carried out the airstrikes while JF-17s and F-16s from other squadrons provided escort and CAP. The Mirage 5PAs dropped their payloads while the Weapon Systems Officers in the Mirage IIIDAs guided the bombs to their respective targets via data link.

=== Argentina ===
==== Falklands War ====
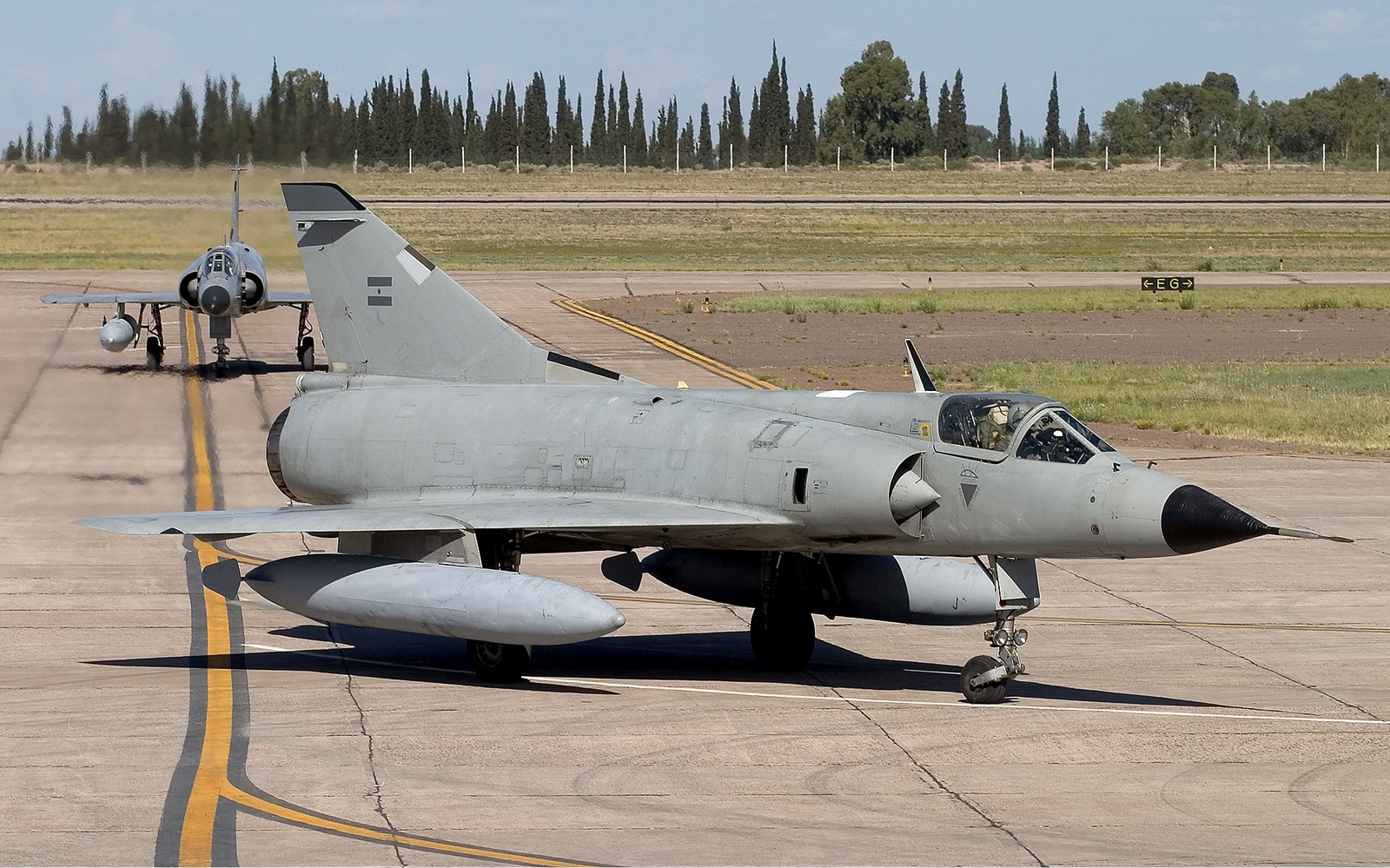
Argentina Air Force Dassault Mirage-IIIEA

The Argentine Air Force deployed their Mirage IIIEA fleet during the 1982 Falklands War. Their ability to function as long-range strike aircraft was dramatically hindered by the type's lack of any aerial refueling capability; even when furnished with a pair of 2,000-litre (528 US gallons, 440 imp gallons) drop tanks to carry extra fuel, the Mirages (and Israeli-built Daggers) would be forced to fly up to the absolute limit of their range in order to even reach the British fleet from the mainland. Normally, the fighters would be sent to engage patrolling British Harrier jets and to provide air cover to a Douglas A-4 Skyhawk strike force; however, they would have no more than five minutes at most over the combat area before having to embark upon the return flight back to their airfields.

Usually, Argentine Mirages were flown with an armament consisting of one Matra R530 or a pair of Magic 1 AAMs. They only entered direct combat once, resulting in one of the Mirages being shot down by an AIM-9L Sidewinder fired by a Harrier, and another destroyed by friendly fire after attempting to land on the runway at Port Stanley when nearly out of fuel. The fighters were frequently deployed to conduct diversion flights, flying at a very high altitude to force a response from the patrolling British Harriers to improve the chances of survival and success of the attack force. Additionally, a number of Mirages were also kept on a high state of alert against possible Avro Vulcan raids upon targets within the Argentine mainland, as well as to serve as a deterrence against aggressive flights by neighbouring Chile conducted upon Argentina's western border.

== Variants ==
M.D.550 Mystère-Delta
Single-seat delta-wing interceptor-fighter prototype, fitted with a delta vertical tail surface, equipped with a retractable tricycle landing gear, powered by two 7.35 kN (1,650 lbf) thrust M.D.30 (Armstrong Siddeley Viper) turbojet engines; one built.
Mirage I
Revised first prototype, fitted with a swept vertical tail surface, powered by two reheated M.D.30R turbojet engines, 9.61 kN (2,160 lbf), also fitted with a 15 kN (3,400 lbf) thrust SEPR 66 rocket booster.
Mirage II
Single-seat delta-wing interceptor-fighter prototype, larger version of the Mirage I, powered by two Turbomeca Gabizo turbojet engines; one abandoned incomplete.
Mirage III-001
Prototype, initially powered by a 44.12 kN (9,920 lbf) thrust Atar 101G1 turbojet engine, later refitted with 43.15 kN (9,700 lbf) Atar 101G-2 and also fitted with a SEPR 66 auxiliary rocket motor; one built.
Mirage IIIA
Pre-production aircraft, with a lengthened, area ruled fuselage and powered by a 42.8 kN (9,600 lbf) dry and 58.84 kN (13,230 lbf) with reheat Atar 9B turbojet engine, also with provision for 13.34 kN (3,000 lbf) SEPR 84 auxiliary rocket motor. Fitted with Dassault Super Aida or Thomson-CSF Cyrano I bis radar. Ten built for the French Air Force.

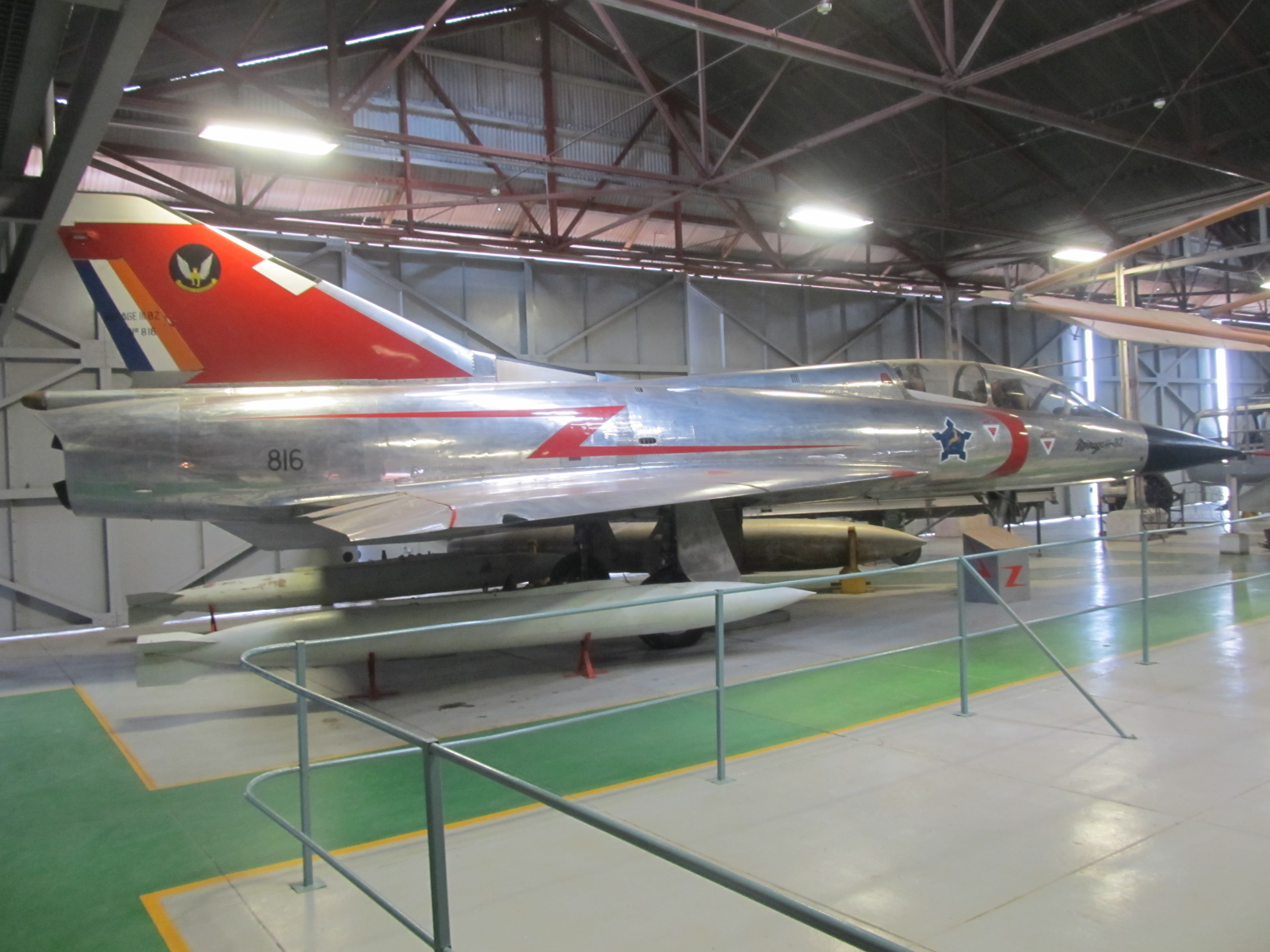
A South African Air Force Mirage IIIBZ on display at the South African Air Force Museum on AFB Swartkop

Mirage IIIB
Two-seat tandem trainer aircraft fitted with one piece canopy. Lacks radar, cannon armament and provision for booster rocket. Prototype (based on the IIIA) first flown on 20 October 1959. Followed by 26 production IIIBs based on IIIC for French Air Force and one for Centre d'essais en vol (CEV) test centre.

- Mirage IIIB-1 : Trials aircraft. Five built.
- Mirage IIIB-2(RV) : Inflight refuelling training aircraft for Mirage IV force, fitted with dummy refuelling probe in nose. Ten built.
- Mirage IIIBE : Two-seat training aircraft based on Mirage IIIE for the French Air Force, similar to the Mirage IIID. 20 built.
- Mirage IIIBJ : Mirage IIIB for Israeli Air Force. Five built. Three later sold to Argentina and delivered between December 1982 and February 1983.
- Mirage IIIBL : Mirage IIIBE for Lebanon Air Force; two built.
- Mirage IIIBS : Mirage IIIB for the Swiss Air Force; four built.
- Mirage IIIBZ : Mirage IIIB for the South African Air Force; three built.

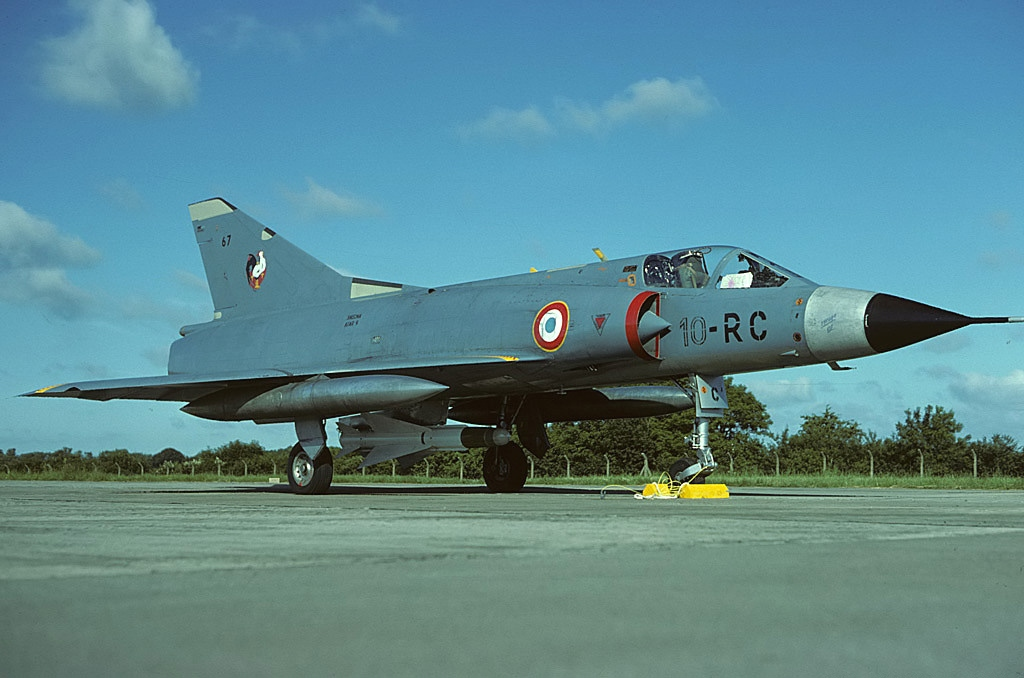
A French Air Force Mirage IIIC in 1980

Mirage IIIC
Single-seat all-weather interceptor-fighter aircraft, with longer fuselage than the IIIA (14.73 m (48 ft 4 in)) and equipped with a Cyrano I bis radar. The Mirage IIIC was armed with two 30 mm (1.181 in) cannons, as well as a single Matra R.511, Nord AA.20 or Matra R530 air-to-air missile under the fuselage and two AIM-9 Sidewinder missiles under the wings. It was powered by an Atar 9B-3 turbojet engine, which could be supplemented by fitting an auxiliary rocket motor in the rear fuselage if the cannons were removed. 95 were built for the French Air Force.

- Mirage IIICJ : Mirage IIIC for the Israeli Air Force, fitted with simpler electronics and with provision for the booster rocket removed. 72 delivered between 1962 and 1964. 19 later sold to Argentina and delivered between December 1982 and February 1983.
- Mirage IIICS : Mirage IIIC supplied to Swiss Air Force in 1962 for evaluation and test purposes. One built.
- Mirage IIICZ : Mirage IIIC for the South African Air Force. 16 supplied between December 1962 and March 1964.
- Mirage IIIC-2 : Conversion of French Mirage IIIE with Atar 09K-6 engine. One aircraft converted, later re-converted to Mirage IIIE.

Mirage IIID
Two-seat trainer version of the Mirage IIIE, powered by 41.97 kN (9,440 lbf) dry and 58.84 kN (13,230 lbf) with reheat Atar 09-C engine. Fitted with distinctive strakes under the nose. Almost identical aircraft designated Mirage IIIBE, IIID and 5Dx depending on customer.

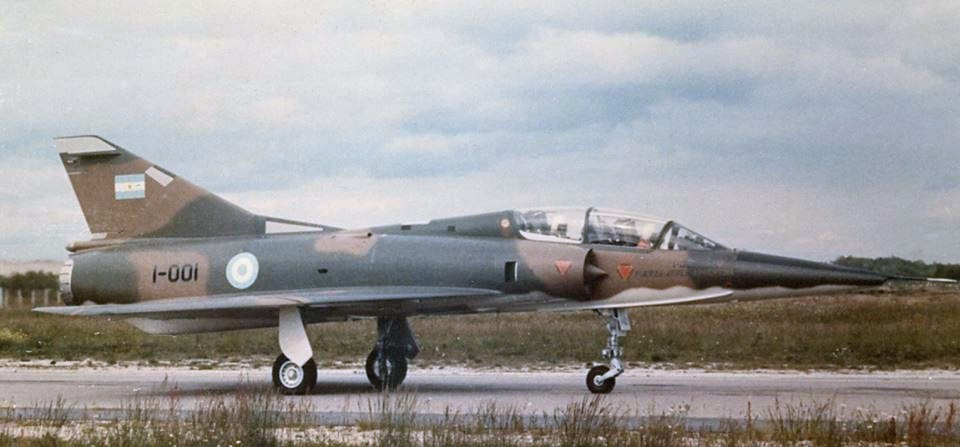
The first Argentine Mirage, a IIIDA

- Mirage IIID : Two-seat training aircraft for the RAAF. Built under licence in Australia; 16 built.
- Mirage IIIDA : Two-seat trainer for the Argentine Air Force. Two supplied 1973 and a further two in 1982.
- Mirage IIIDBR : Two-seat trainer for the Brazilian Air Force, designated F-103D. Four newly built aircraft delivered from 1972. Two ex-French Air Force Mirage IIIBEs delivered 1984 to make up for losses in accidents.
- Mirage IIIDBR-2 : Refurbished and updated aircraft for the Brazilian Air Force, with more modern avionics and canard foreplanes. Two ex-French aircraft sold to Brazil in 1988, with remaining two DBRs upgraded to same standard.
- Mirage IIIDE : Two-seat trainer for Spanish Air Force. Seven built with local designation CE.11.
- Mirage IIIDP : Two-seat trainer for the Pakistan Air Force. Five built.
- Mirage IIIDS : Two-seat trainer for the Swiss Air Force. Two delivered in 1983.
- Mirage IIIDZ : Two-seat trainer for the South African Air Force; three delivered in 1969.
- Mirage IIID2Z : Two-seat trainer for the South African Air Force; eleven delivered in 1973 and 1974, with an additional example delivered in knocked-down form in 1979 and assembled in South Africa.

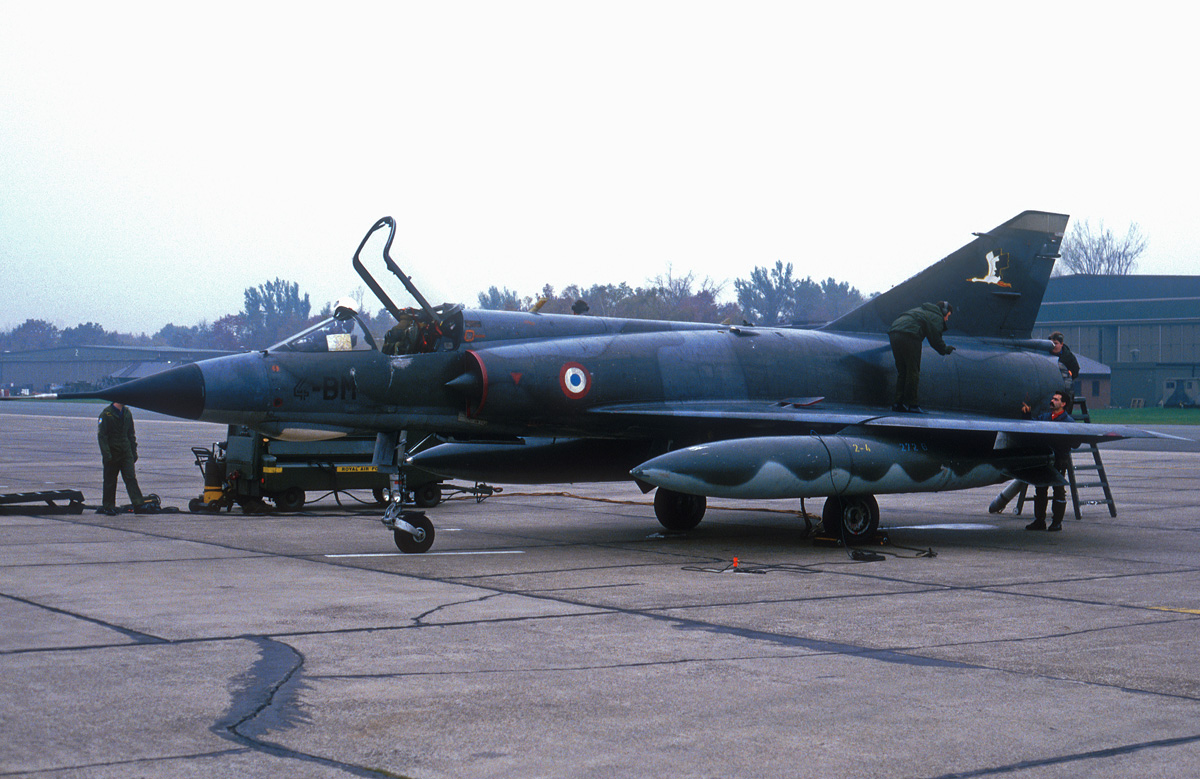
A French Air Force Mirage IIIE in 1987

Brazilian Mirage IIIEBR in 1995

Mirage IIIE
Single-seat tactical strike and fighter-bomber aircraft, with 300 mm (12 in) fuselage plug to accommodate an additional avionics bay behind the cockpit. Fitted with Cyrano II radar with additional air-to-ground modes compared to Mirage IIIC, improved navigation equipment, including TACAN and a Doppler radar in undernose bulge. Powered by an Atar 09C-3 turbojet engine. 183 built for the French Air Force.

- Mirage IIIEA : Mirage IIIE for the Argentine Air Force. 17 built.
- Mirage IIIEBR : Mirage IIIE for the Brazilian Air Force; 16 built, locally designated F-103E.
- Mirage IIIEBR-2 : Refurbished and updated aircraft for the Brazilian Air Force, with canard foreplanes. Four ex-French aircraft sold to Brazil in 1988, with surviving Mirage IIIEBRs upgraded to same standard.
- Mirage IIIEE : Mirage IIIE for the Spanish Air Force, locally designated C.11. 24 delivered from 1970.
- Mirage IIIEL : Mirage IIIE for the Lebanese Air Force, omitting doppler radar, including HF antenna. 10 delivered from 1967 to 1969.
- Mirage IIIEP : Mirage IIIE for the Pakistan Air Force. 18 delivered 1967–1969.
- Mirage IIIEV : Mirage IIIE for the Venezuelan Air Force, omitting doppler radar. Seven built. Survivors upgraded to Mirage 50EV standard.
- Mirage IIIEZ : Mirage IIIE for the South African Air Force; 17 delivered 1965–1972.

Mirage IIIO
Single-seat all-weather fighter-bomber aircraft for the Royal Australian Air Force. Single prototype powered by 53.68 kN (12,070 lbf) dry thrust and 71.17 kN (16,000 lbf) Rolls-Royce Avon Mk.67 turbojet engine, but order placed for aircraft based on Mirage IIIE, powered by Atar engine in March 1961. 100 aircraft built, of which 98 were built under licence in Australia. The first 49 were Mirage IIIO(F) interceptors which were followed by 51 Mirage IIIO(A) fighter-bombers, with survivors brought up to a common standard later.

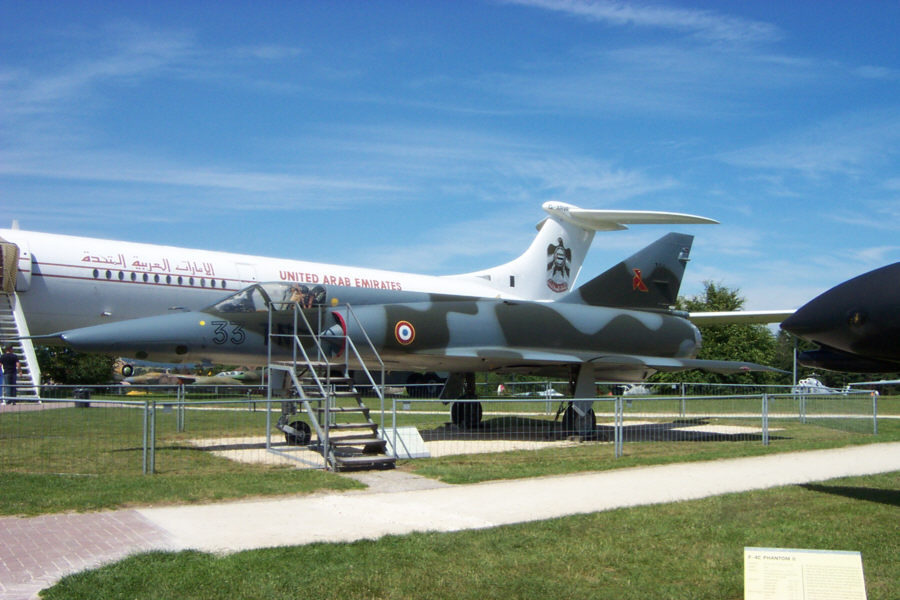
French Mirage IIIR

Mirage IIIR
Single-seat all-weather reconnaissance aircraft, with radar replaced by camera nose carrying up to five cameras. Aircraft based on IIIE airframe but with simpler avionics similar to that fitted to the IIIC and retaining cannon armament of fighters. Two prototypes and 50 production aircraft built for the French Air Force.

- Mirage IIIRD : Single-seat all-weather reconnaissance aircraft for the French Air Force, equipped with improved avionics, including undernose doppler radar as in the Mirage IIIE. Provision to carry infrared linescan, Doppler navigation radar or side looking airborne radar (SLAR) in interchangeable pod. 20 built.
- Mirage IIIRJ : Single-seat all-weather reconnaissance aircraft of the Israeli Air Force. Two Mirage IIICJs converted into reconnaissance aircraft.
- Mirage IIIRP : Export version of the Mirage IIIR for the Pakistan Air Force; 3 built
- Mirage IIIRP2 : Export version of the Mirage IIIR for the Pakistan Air Force, with provision to carry the infrared linescan pod; 10 built.
- Mirage IIIRS : Export version of the Mirage IIIR for the Swiss Air Force; 18 built
- Mirage IIIRZ : Export version of the Mirage IIIR for the South African Air Force; four built.
- Mirage IIIR2Z : Export version of the Mirage IIIR for the South African Air Force, fitted with an Atar 9K-50 turbojet engine; four built.

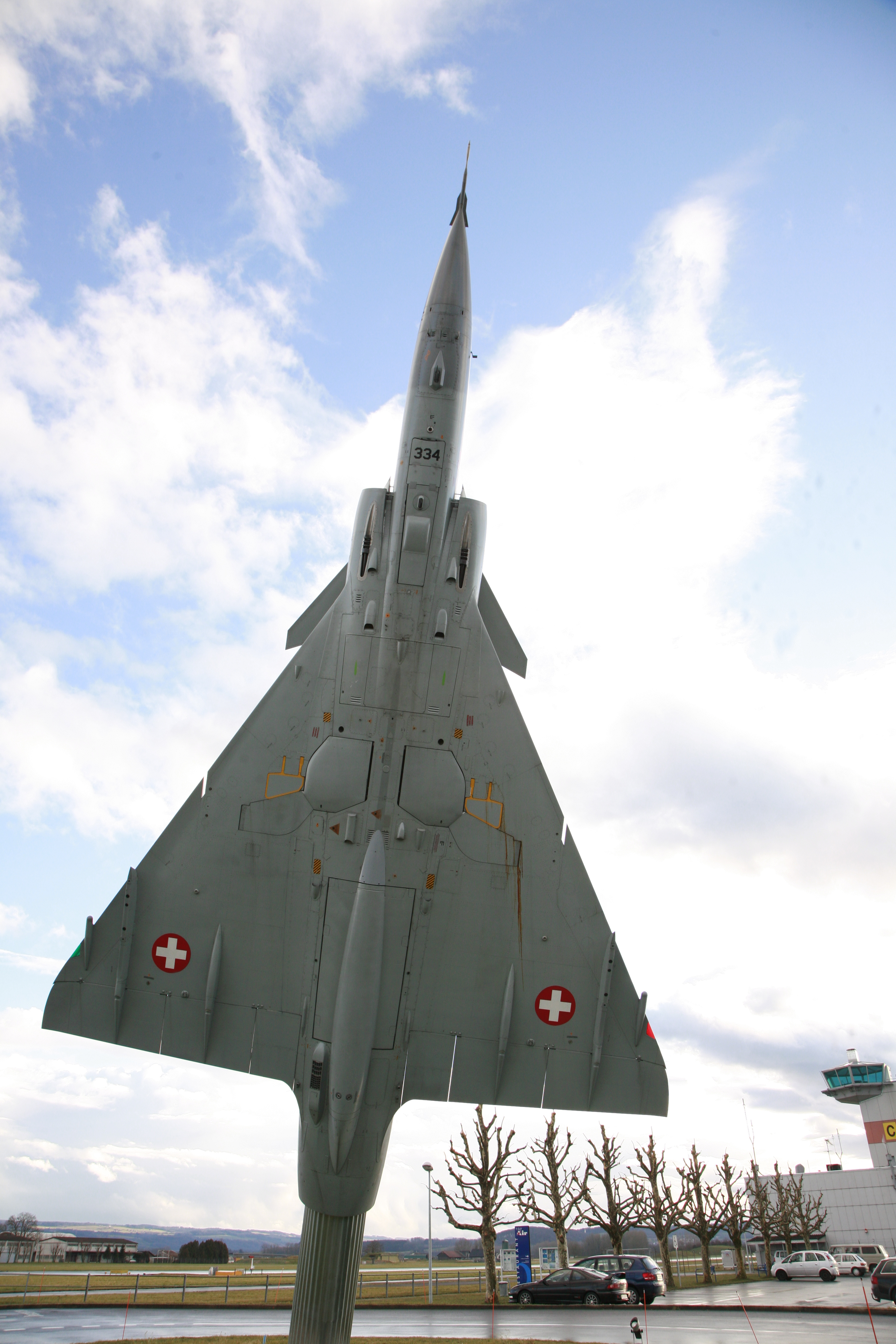
The belly of a Mirage IIIS

Mirage IIIS
Single-seat all-weather interceptor fighter aircraft for the Swiss Air Force, based on the IIIE, but fitted with a Hughes TARAN 18 radar and fire-control system and armed with AIM-4 Falcon and Sidewinder air-to-air missiles. Built under licence in Switzerland; 36 built.
Mirage IIIT
One aircraft converted into an engine testbed, initially fitted with a subsonic 46.7–61.8 kN (10,500–13,890 lbf) Pratt & Whitney/SNECMA TF104, but retrofitted with a supersonic 51.96–74.53 kN (11,680–16,755 lbf) Pratt & Whitney/SNECMA TF106 turbofan engine.
Mirage IIIEX
Proposed version, first flight April 8, 1988, fitted with updated avionics, powered by an Atar 9K-50 turbojet engine. Unlike the Mirage IIING, it featured the full forward fuselage of the Mirage F1, including the radome, cockpit, and all the way back to the intakes, and the canards by comparison were located further aft on the intakes. It did not use the unique leading edge root extensions of the earlier Mirage IIING, but instead featured strakes under the canopy area.

A total of 1,403 Mirage III/5/50 aircraft of all types were built by Dassault. There were a few unbuilt variants:

- A Mirage IIIK that was powered by a Rolls-Royce Spey turbofan was offered to the British Royal Air Force.
- The Mirage IIIM was a carrier-based variant, with catapult spool and arresting hook, for operation with the French Aéronavale.
- The Mirage IIIW was a lightweight fighter version, proposed for a US competition, with Dassault partnered with Boeing. The aircraft would have been produced by Boeing, but it lost to the Northrop F-5.

=== Derivatives ===
==== Mirage 5/Mirage 50 ====
The next major variant, the Mirage 5, grew out of a request to Dassault from the Israeli Air Force. The first Mirage 5 flew on 19 May 1967. It looked much like the Mirage III, except it had a long slender nose that extended the aircraft's length by about half a meter. The Mirage 5 itself led directly to the Israeli Nesher, either through a Mossad (Israeli intelligence) intelligence operation or through covert cooperation with AdA, depending upon which story is accepted. (See details in the Nesher article). In either case, the design gave rise to the Kfir, which can be considered a direct descendant of the Mirage III.

==== Milan ====
In 1968, Dassault, in cooperation with the Swiss, began work on a Mirage update known as the Milan ("Kite"). The main feature of the Milan was a pair of pop-out foreplanes in the nose, which were referred to as "moustaches". The moustaches were intended to provide better take-off performance and low-speed control for the attack role. The three initial prototypes were converted from existing Mirage fighters; one of these prototypes was nicknamed "Asterix", after the internationally popular French cartoon character, a tough little Gallic warrior with a huge moustache.

A fully equipped prototype rebuilt from a Mirage IIIR flew in May 1970, and was powered by the uprated 70.6 kN (15,900 lbf) afterburning thrust SNECMA Atar 09K-50 engine, following the evaluation of an earlier model of this new series on the one-off Mirage IIIC2. The Milan also had updated avionics, including a laser designator and rangefinder in the nose. A second fully equipped prototype was produced for Swiss evaluation as the Milan S. The canards did provide significant handling benefits, but they had drawbacks. They blocked the pilot's forward view to an extent, and set up turbulence in the engine intakes. The Milan concept was abandoned in 1972, while work continued on achieving the same goals with canards.

==== Mirage IIING ====
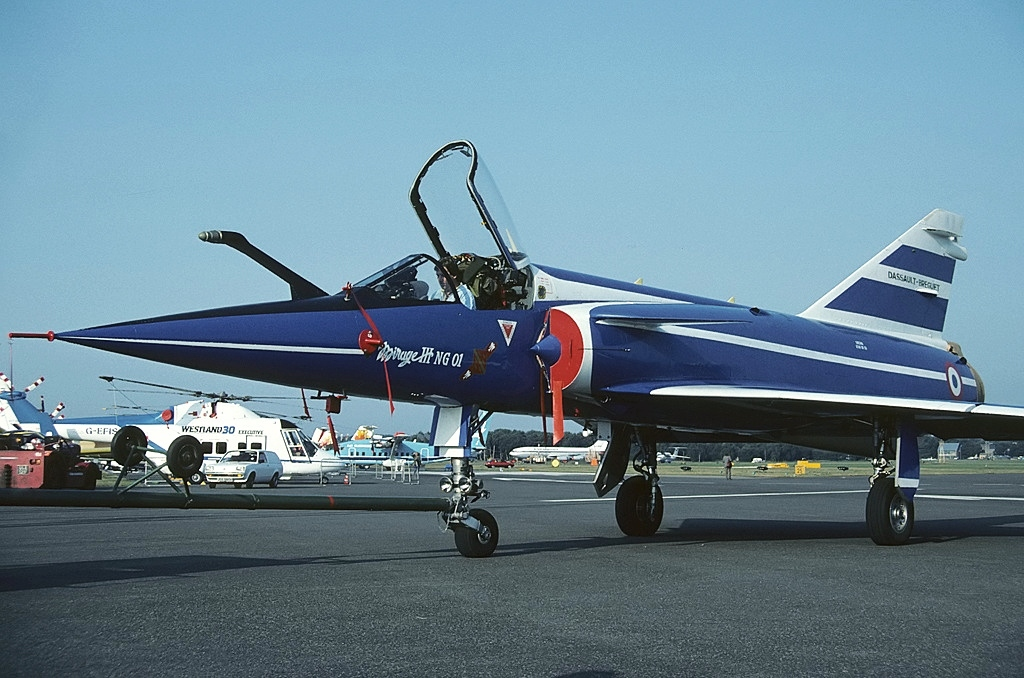
Mirage IIING

Following the development of the Mirage 50, Dassault had experimented with yet another derivative of the original Mirage series, named the Mirage IIING (Nouvelle Génération, new generation). Like the Milan and Mirage 50, the IIING was powered by the Atar 9K-50 engine. The prototype, a conversion of a Mirage IIIR, flew on 21 December 1982.

The Mirage IIING had a modified delta wing with leading-edge root extensions, plus a pair of fixed canards fitted above and behind the air intakes. The aircraft's avionics were completely modernized, making use of the parallel development effort underway for the next-generation Mirage 2000 fighter. Chiefly amongst these changes, the Mirage IIING used a fly-by-wire system to allow control over the aircraft's relaxed stability. The aircraft had an improved nav/attack system with inertial navigation and a head-up display. A variety of radars could be fitted, including the Cyrano IV and Agave and these could be supplemented by a laser rangefinder. The uprated engine and aerodynamics improved take-off and sustained turn performance.

Ultimately, the type never went into production, but to an extent the Mirage IIING was a demonstrator for various technologies that could be and were featured in upgrades to existing Mirage IIIs and Mirage 5s. After 1989, enhancements derived from the Mirage IIING were incorporated into Brazilian Mirage IIIEs, as well as into four ex-Armée de l'Air Mirage IIIEs that were transferred to Brazil in 1988. In 1989, Dassault offered a similar upgrade refit of ex-AdA Mirage IIIEs under the designation Mirage IIIEX, featuring canards, a fixed in-flight refueling probe, a longer nose, new avionics, and other refinements.

==== Balzac / Mirage IIIV ====
One of the offshoots of the Mirage III/5/50 fighter family tree was the Mirage IIIV vertical take-off and landing (VTOL) fighter. ("IIIV" is read "three-vee," not "three-five"). This aircraft featured eight small vertical lift jets straddling the main engine. The Mirage IIIV was built in response to a mid-1960s NATO specification for a VTOL strike fighter. It used eight RB.162-31 lift engines(generating 5,400 lb thrust each), long-stroke landing gears, and additional covers to reduce impact of the lift engine exhausts. The main engine was a SNECMA TF-104 turbojet.

==== Mirage III ROSE ====
Project ROSE (Retrofit Of Strike Element) was an upgrade programme launched by the Pakistan Air Force to upgrade old Dassault Mirage III and Mirage 5 aircraft with modern avionics. In the early 1990s, the PAF procured 50 ex-Australian Mirage III fighters, 33 of which were selected after an inspection to undergo upgrades. In the first phases of Project ROSE, the ex-Australian Mirage III fighters were fitted with new defensive systems and cockpits, which included new HUDs, MFDs, RWRs, HOTAS controls, radar altimeters and navigation/attack systems. They were also fitted with the FIAR Grifo M3 multi-mode radar and designated ROSE I. Around 34 Mirage 5 attack fighters also underwent upgrades designated ROSE II and ROSE III before Project ROSE was completed.

== Operators ==
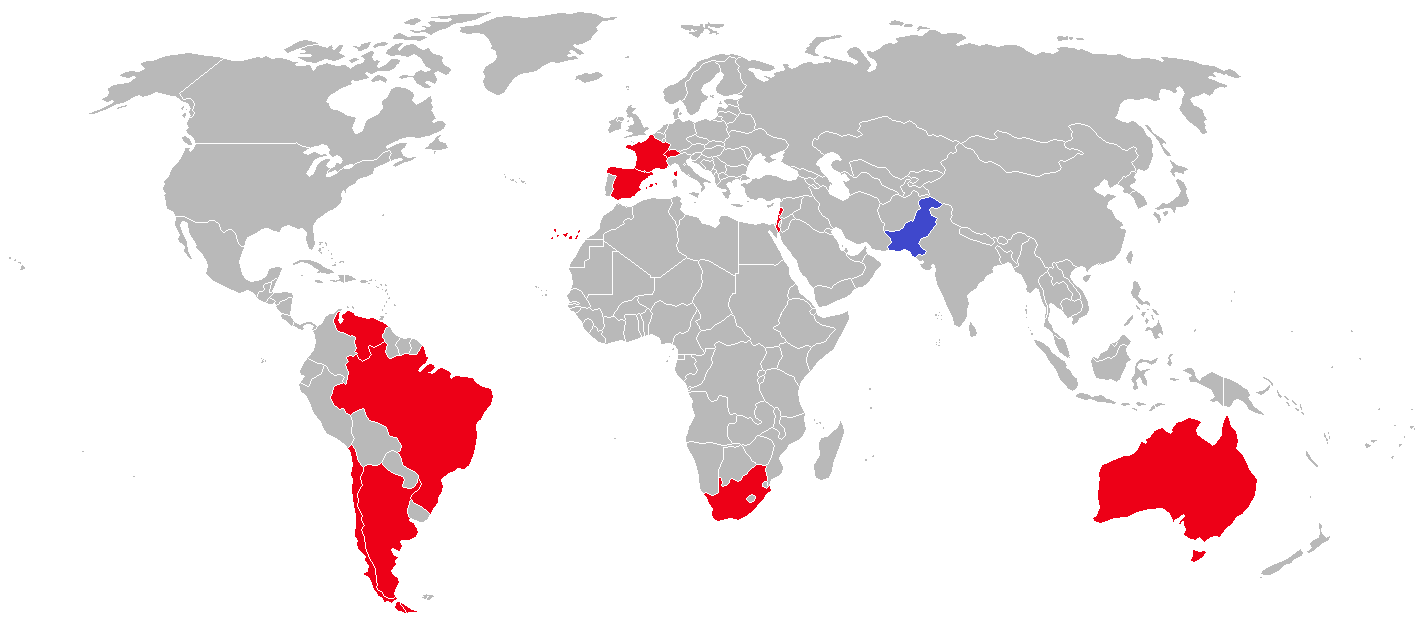
Mirage III operators; Current Former

=== Military operators ===
==== Current ====
- Pakistan: 49
  - Combat Commanders' School, PAF Base Mushaf, Mirage IIIO ROSE I
  - 5 Squadron, PAF Base Mushaf, Mirage IIIEP, IIIDP, IIIRP - (1968–2010)
  - 7 Squadron, PAF Base Masroor, Mirage IIIO ROSE I, IIIDP
  - 20 Squadron, PAF Base Mushaf, Mirage IIIRP - (1977–1988)
  - 22 Squadron, PAF Base Masroor, Mirage IIIEL, IIIBL, IIID
  - around 48 aircraft are retired (out of service)

==== Former ====
- France: 348
- Australia: 116
- Israel: 76
- Switzerland: 60
- South Africa: 58
- Argentina: 43
- Brazil: 32
- Spain: 31
- Lebanon: 12
- Venezuela: 7

== Aircraft on display ==
=== Argentina ===
Mirage IIICJ

- C-704 (restored as C-437) – Argentine Air Force – Preserved on a roundabout in Tres Arroyos, Buenos Aires province
- C-706 – Argentine Air Force – Preserved on a roundabout in Villa Lugano, Buenos Aires
- C-711 – Argentine Air Force – Plaza VI Brigada Aérea, Tandil, Buenos Aires province
- C-712 – Argentine Air Force – Museo Nacional de Aeronáutica de Argentina, Morón, Buenos Aires province
- C-714 (Restored as I-019) – Argentine Air Force – Preserved on a square in Villa Carlos Paz, Córdoba province
- C-715 – Argentine Air Force – Liceo Militar Aeronáutico, Funes, Santa Fe province
- C-716 – Argentine Air Force – El Plumerillo Military Air Base, Mendoza province
- C-718 – Argentine Air Force – Museo Interfuerzas de Estancia San Romana, San Luis province
- C-721 – Argentine Air Force – Museo Nacional de Aeronáutica de Argentina, Buenos Aires province

Mirage IIIDA

- I-002 – Argentine Air Force – Museo Nacional de Aeronáutica de Argentina, Buenos Aires province

Mirage IIIEA

- I-004 – Argentine Air Force – Preserved as a monument in Dolores, Buenos Aires province
- I-008 – Argentine Air Force – Preserved as a monument in Villa Ramallo, Buenos Aires province
- I-011 – Argentine Air Force – Museo Nacional de Aeronáutica de Argentina, Buenos Aires province
- Unknown ID (Restored as I-014) – Argentine Air Force – Preserved at the waterfront in Bariloche, Río Negro province

=== Australia ===
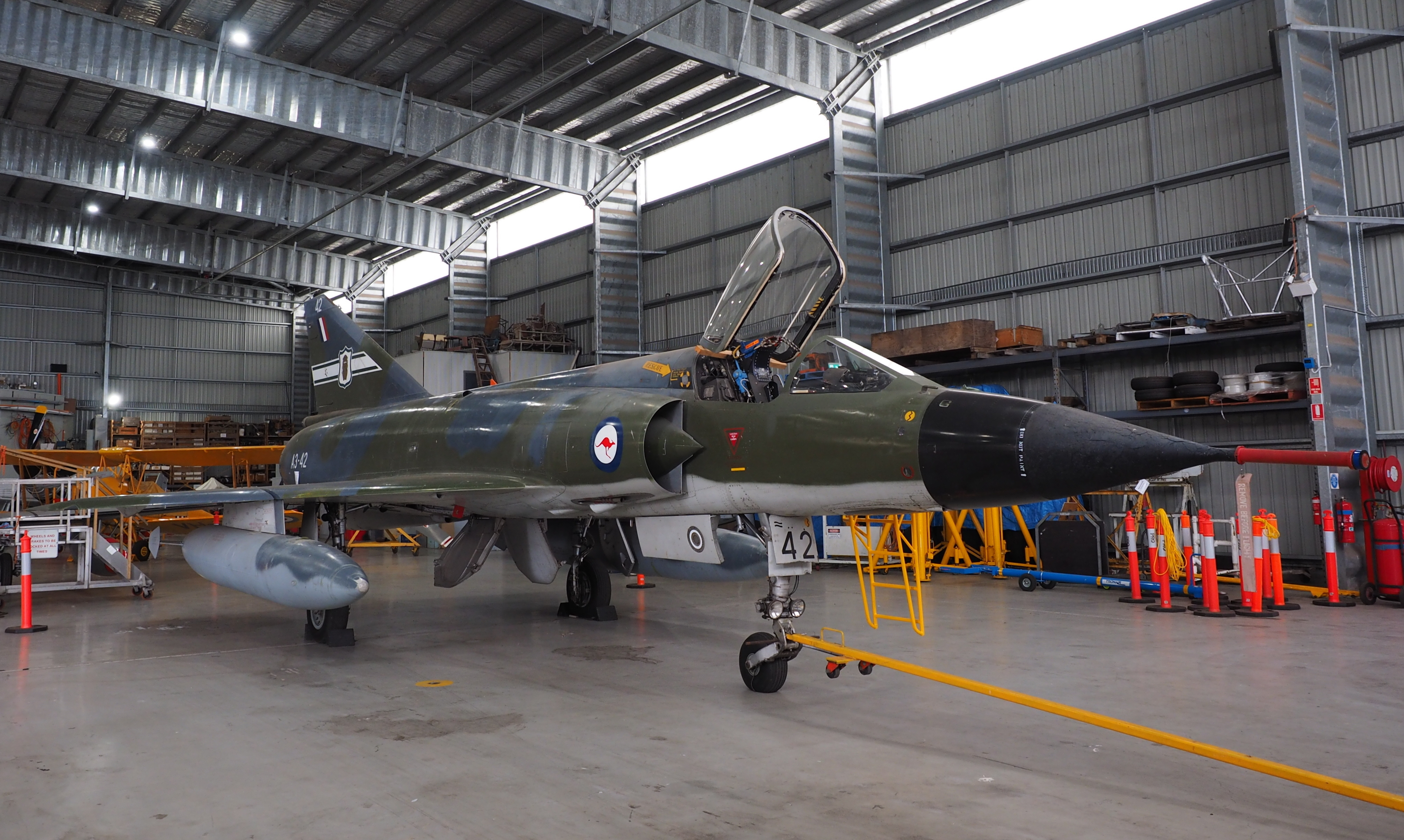
A3-42 on display at the Historical Aircraft Restoration Society in 2020

Information from:

Mirage IIIO(F)

- A3-3 – Royal Australian Air Force – Fighter World, RAAF Base Williamtown, New South Wales
- A3-8 – Royal Australian Air Force – nose section at Classic Jets Fighter Museum, Parafield Airport, South Australia
- A3-16 – Royal Australian Air Force – Queensland Air Museum, Caloundra Airport
- A3-36 – Royal Australian Air Force – Australian Aviation Heritage Centre, Darwin, Northern Territory
- A3-41 – Royal Australian Air Force – gate guard at RAAF Base Wagga, New South Wales
- A3-42 – Royal Australian Air Force – Historical Aircraft Restoration Society, Illawarra Regional Airport, New South Wales, to be restored to flying condition with Mach 1 capability.
- A3-44 – Royal Australian Air Force – Australian Aviation Museum, Bankstown Airport, New South Wales
- A3-45 – Royal Australian Air Force – Australian National Aviation Museum, Moorabbin Airport, Victoria

Mirage IIIO(A)

- A3-51 – Royal Australian Air Force – RAAF Museum, Point Cook, Victoria
- A3-55 – Royal Australian Air Force – Aviation Heritage Centre, RAAF Base Amberley, Queensland
- A3-72 – Royal Australian Air Force – RAAF Museum, Point Cook, Victoria
- A3-90 – Royal Australian Air Force – Fighter World, RAAF Base Williamtown, New South Wales (tail fin only)
- A3-92 – Royal Australian Air Force – RAAF Museum, Point Cook, Victoria
- A3-97 – Royal Australian Air Force – cockpit at Fighter World, RAAF Base Williamtown, New South Wales

Mirage IIID

- A3-102 – Royal Australian Air Force – Fighter World, RAAF Base Williamtown, New South Wales
- A3-115 – Royal Australian Air Force – Formerly gate guard at RAAF Base Edinburgh, South Australia, now an exhibit at the South Australian Aviation Museum, Port Adelaide, South Australia.
- A3-116 – Royal Australian Air Force – tail section at No 331 Squadron, Australian Air Force Cadets, Coffs Harbour, New South Wales

=== Brazil ===
Mirage IIIEBR

- FAB4901 – Brazilian Air Force – Vila dos Sargentos, Anápolis.
- FAB4913 – Brazilian Air Force – Museu Aeroespacial (Musal), Rio de Janeiro.
- FAB4925 – Brazilian Air Force – Academia da Força Aérea, Pirassununga.
- FAB4926 – Brazilian Air Force – Terceira Força Aérea (III FAE), Brasília.
- FAB4927 – Brazilian Air Force – Parque de Material Aeronáutico de São Paulo (PAMA-SP), São Paulo
- FAB4931 – Brazilian Air Force – Orungan Square, Salvador.

=== France ===
Mirage IIIA

- A-02 – ISAE-SUPAERO, Toulouse

Mirage IIIC

- The 4th production Mirage IIIC – Musee de l'Aéronautique, Savigny-lès-Beaune
- #27 – Aeroscopia Museum, Blagnac
- Unmarked – Ailes Anciennes, Blagnac

Mirage IIIE

- #491 – Ailes Anciennes, Blagnac

Mirage IIIEX

- #467 - European Fighter Aircraft Museum (Montélimar)

=== Israel ===
Mirage IIIC

- #158 – Israeli Air Force – Israeli Air Force Museum, Hatzerim.
- #159 – Argentinian Air Force – Israeli Air Force Museum, Hatzerim.

=== Spain ===
Mirage IIIEE

- #111-04 - Museu de les Ciències Príncipe Felipe, Valencia

=== United Kingdom ===
Mirage IIIE

- #538 - Yorkshire Air Museum, Elvington

== Specifications (Mirage IIIE) ==
Four-view drawing of Mirage IIIC

Data from Encyclopedia of World Military Aircraft

General characteristics

- Crew: 1
- Length: 15.03 m (49 ft 4 in)
- Wingspan: 8.22 m (27 ft 0 in)
- Height: 4.5 m (14 ft 9 in)
- Wing area: 34.85 m^{2} (375.1 sq ft)
- Empty weight: 7,050 kg (15,543 lb)
- Gross weight: 9,600 kg (21,164 lb)
- Max takeoff weight: 13,700 kg (30,203 lb)
- Powerplant: 1 × SNECMA Atar 09C afterburning turbojet engine, 41.97 kN (9,440 lbf) thrust dry, 60.8 kN (13,700 lbf) with afterburner
- Powerplant: 1 × SEPR 841 liquid-fuelled rocket engine, 14.7 kN (3,300 lbf) thrust

Performance

- Maximum speed: 2,350 km/h (1,460 mph, 1,270 kn) at 12,000 m (39,000 ft)
- Maximum speed: Mach 2.2
- Combat range: 1,200 km (750 mi, 650 nmi)
- Ferry range: 3,335 km (2,072 mi, 1,801 nmi)
- Service ceiling: 17,000 m (56,000 ft)
- Rate of climb: 83 m/s (16,400 ft/min)
- Wing loading: 275 kg/m^{2} (56.4 lb/sq ft)

Armament

- Guns: 2 × 30 mm (1.181 in) DEFA 552 cannon with 125 rounds per gun
- Rockets: 2 × Matra JL-100 drop tank/rocket pack, each with 19× 68 mm (2.7 in) SNEB rockets and 250 L (66 US gal; 55 imp gal) of fuel
- Missiles: 2 × AIM-9B Sidewinder Air to Air missiles (AAM) or
  - 2 × Matra R.550 Magic AAMs plus 1× Matra R.530 AAM
- Bombs: 4,000 kg (8,800 lb) of payload on five external hardpoints, including a variety of bombs, reconnaissance pods or Drop tanks; French Air Force IIIEs through to 1991 were equipped to carry the AN-52 nuclear bomb.

Avionics

- Thomson-CSF Cyrano II radar
- Marconi continuous-wave Doppler navigation radar

== See also ==
Related development

- Atlas Cheetah
- Dassault Mirage IV
- Dassault Mirage 5
- Dassault Mirage IIIV
- Dassault Mirage 2000
- IAI Kfir

Aircraft of comparable role, configuration, and era

- Convair F-102 Delta Dagger – (United States)
- Lockheed F-104 Starfighter – (United States)
- Mikoyan-Gurevich MiG-21 – (Soviet Union) / Chengdu J-7 – (China)
- Saab 35 Draken – (Sweden)

Related lists

- List of fighter aircraft
- List of military aircraft of France

Record setting pilots

- Jacqueline Auriol
