= Inter Squadron Armament Competition =

Military sports event in Pakistan

Inter Squadron Armament Competition انٹر سکواڈرن ہتھیاری مقابلہ
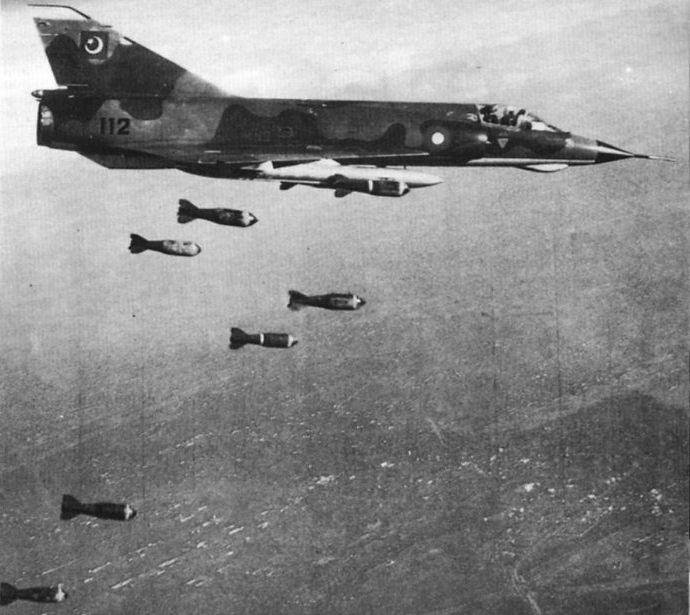
- Mirage-IIIEP drops M117 dumb bombs over Thal firing ranges during ISAC-1974.
- Nickname: ISAC
- Genre: Military sport Live fire exercise
- Frequency: Random
- Venue: Sonmiani Flight Test Range; Jamrud Firing Ranges (formerly); Thal desert
- Country: Pakistan
- Inaugurated: 1949
- Most recent: 2019
- Previous event: 2015
- Next event: Unknown
- Organiser: Pakistan Air Force
- Website: www.paf.gov.pk

The Inter-Squadron Armament Competition (ISAC) is a military sports event hosted by the Pakistan Air Force (PAF). It is an event designed to assess and celebrate the skill and operational readiness of its squadrons. This competition evaluates the training of aircrews and ground teams, focusing on their ability to perform under warlike conditions.

== History ==
Following the independence of Pakistan and establishment of the Royal Pakistan Air Force, the RPAF had two primary combat squadrons, namely the 5 Squadron "Falcons" and 9 Squadron "Griffins". There was a sense of rivalry between these two pioneering units. Airmen and officers would face each other during military exercises trying to gain the advantage over the other.

Eventually, this rivalry led to the first ever inter-squadron drill in May 1949 being organized under the leadership of RPAF's then British commander AVM Allan Perry-Keene. 9 Squadron later won the competition and bagged the Perry-Keene trophy for themselves.

=== Evolution into ISAC ===
By the early 1960s, significant changes were introduced to the operational structure and traditions under Air Marshal Asghar Khan's major modernization program. As part of this revamping project he introduced the concept of a large-scale gunnery competition involving all of the PAF's combat aircraft squadrons.

== Competition ==
Whenever ISAC takes place (normally every four years), a team composed of the four best pilots along with maintenance staff from every PAF combat aircraft squadron is selected to compete against other squadrons in live weapons firing involving strafing runs, precision bombing and dropping dumb bombs via CCIP.

=== Awards ===
Name	Introduced	Awarded to	Notes
Sher Afgan Trophy	1949	Top-performing pilot of the competition	Formerly known as Perry-Keene Trophy.
Armament Competition Trophy	Unknown	Squadron with highest score in the competition	
Maintenance Trophy	Unknown	Squadron with the most well maintained equipment.	
Best Armament Trophy	2019		Shared by 2 & 8 Squadrons in ISAC-2019.

== Known events ==
Inter Squadron Armament Competition
Year	Venue	Champion	Notes
1949	Unknown	9 Squadron	First competition between RPAF's sole two fighter squadrons.
1952	Unknown	5 Squadron	
1960	Unknown	16 Squadron	
1966	Mauripur	19 Squadron	
1974	Thal desert	Unknown	
1997	Unknown	9 Squadron	
2007	Sonmiani	9 Squadron	
2015	Karachi	11 Squadron	
2019	Sonmiani	11 Squadron	

== See also ==
- International Military Sports Council
- International Army Games
- Tank biathlon
