= Naval flag signalling =

Flag signalling, such as semaphore or flaghoist, used by various navies

Naval flag signalling covers various forms of flag signalling, such as semaphore or flaghoist, used by various navies; distinguished from maritime flag signalling by merchant or other non-naval vessels or flags used for identification.

== History ==
Naval flag signalling undoubtedly developed in antiquity in order to coordinate naval action of multiple vessels. In the Peloponnesian War (431–401 BC) squadrons of Athenian galleys were described by Thucydides as engaging in coordinated maneuvers which would have required some kind of communication; there is no record of how such communication was done but flags would have been the most likely method.

Flags have long been used to identify a ship's owner or nationality, or the commander of a squadron. But the use of flags for signalling messages long remained primitive, as indicated by the 1530 instruction that when the Admiral

doth shote of a pece of Ordnance, and set up his Banner of Council on Starrborde bottocke of his Shippe, everie shipps capten shall with spede go aborde the Admyrall to know his will.

Several wars with the Dutch in the 17th century prompted the English to issue instructions for the conduct of particular fleets, such as (in 1673) the Duke of York's "Instructions for the better Ordering of His Majesties Fleet in Sayling". Signals were primitive and rather ad hoc ("As soon as the Admiral shall loose his fore-top and fire a gun..."), and generally a one-way communication system, as only flagships carried a complete set of flags. In 1790 Admiral Lord Howe issued a new signal book for a numerary system using numeral flags to signal a number; the number, not the mast from which the flags flew, indicated the message. Other admirals tried various systems; it was not until 1799 that the Admiralty issued a standardized signal code system for the entire Royal Navy. This was limited to only the signals listed in the Signal-Book. In 1800 Captain Sir Home Popham devised a means of extending this: signals made with a special "Telegraph" flag refererred to a separate dictionary of numbered words and phrases. A similar system was devised by Captain Marryat in 1817 "for the use of vessels employed in the merchant service".

Marryat's Code of Signals and various competitors have been supplanted by the International Code of Signals (ICS) for general maritime use. Most navies now use the flags of the ICS for 26 letters A through Z, sometimes augmenting them with additional flags for other national characters. But they retain additional flags for naval usage (such as related to maneuvering or status), and use their own codes. For example, in the ICS the single flag Mike means the vessel is stopped; in the U.S. Navy it means the duty medical officer is on board.

Flaghoist was the only way ships could signal prior to the advent of radio and blinking light. Even now it is often the preferred method of signalling messages of local significance. A radio message that "[ship's call sign] is fueling, everyone stand clear" is incomplete without information as to where the ship is; it is also distracting for many remote parties that are not affected, and congests the radio channel. Flying the Bravo flag is complete information: "danger, stand clear of here". It also communicates to all local parties, including personnel in the vicinity, or in passing small boats that do not have radios. Similarly, a radio message to the effect "this is the admiral, follow me" could lead to disaster if anyone mistook which ship the admiral is on.

== Flag examples ==
=== Numerals ===
Source	Numeral									
Source	0	1	2	3	4	5	6	7	8	9
NATO										
ICS										
Russian										

=== Substitutes ===
These flags indicate a repeat of the first, second, etc., flag in that hoist.

First substitute	Second substitute	Third substitute	Fourth substitute
=== Naval maneuvering signals ===
Code/answer (ANS)	Preparatory (PREP)	Question (INT)	Negation (NEGAT)	Designation (DESIG)
Course pennant (CORPEN)	Turn (TURN)	Screen (SCREEN)	Speed (SPEED)	Station (STATION)
Port (PORT)	Starboard (STBD)	Formation (FORM)	Division (DIV)	Squadron (SQUAD)
Group (FLOT)	Subdivision (SUBDIV)	Emergency (EMERG)

=== Sample flag meanings ===
Despite NATO sharing the same alphabetic flags as the International Code of Signals, the meanings are not shared between the codes. Furthermore, the NATO code uses a number of special flags which alter the meaning of the hoist. All below signals have been taken from a 2003 unclassified NATO codebook.

Sample NATO messages
Flag hoist	Code	Meaning	Flag hoist	Code	Meaning	Flag hoist	Code	Meaning
	A	Divers or friendly explosive ordnance disposal personnel down. (A numeral group following indicates the radius in hundreds of yards inside which personnel are operating.)		F	FLIGHT OPERATIONS (Flag hoist only): At dip: I am ready to operate fixed-wing aircraft when wind conditions are suitable.; Dipped after being close up: My flight operations have been delayed temporarily (about 10 minutes).; Close up: I am operating fixed-wing aircraft.; Hauled down: I have completed operating fixed-wing aircraft.		K	Personnel are working aloft and/or over the side.
	CODE K	I wish to communicate with you. (ICS meaning indicated by using the Code pennant)		L	Radiation Hazard Warning: Do not approach within ____ yards of this unit or unit. (Indicated without obtaining positive clearance to do so.): 1. 200; 2. 500; 3. 3,000		Q	All boats belonging to this ship or boat(s) addressed return to this ship immediately.
	EMERG C	You are on collision course with me. Keep clear. ("Emergency" indicates the signal is to be acted upon as soon as understood.)		TURN; STARBOARD; 15	Turn together by 150 degrees to starboard		INT; E SPEED	What is the enemy's speed? ("Interrogative" denotes a question.)
	AD26—3	Dispose of refuse when clear of harbor. (Flag 3 is used as a complement to the meaning of the other flags and is thus separated from them by a tackline.)		MW 106	Mines in area are dangerous to divers. No diving is to take place. (The "MW" prefix indicates this signal concerns mine warfare; similar prefixes are used where otherwise appropriate, e.g. "AA" indicates signals concerning aircraft and anti-aircraft operations.)		NEGAT; SU33	All torpedoes (or ____ number) have not been recovered. Ships to whom they belong may be indicated. (Here, a substitute flag is used in the number group. Furthermore, the "negative" pennant changes the meaning to the negative.)

== See also ==
- Bravo Zulu
- Bunting tosser
- England expects that every man will do his duty (a famous flag signal).
- Maritime flag signalling
- Semaphore
- Signal lamp
- International Code of Signals
- Russian Navy Code of Signals
- Japanese Navy Signal Flags

== Sources ==
- The Bluejackets' Manual (various ed.), U. S. Naval Institute
- Chapman, Charles, Piloting, Seamanship, and Small Boat Handling (various ed.)
- Marryat, Captain Frederick (1847), A Code of Signals for the Use of Vessels Employed in the Merchant Service, by Captain Marryat, R.N. (10th ed.)
- Thucydides, The Peloponnesian War (various ed.)
- Wilson, Timothy (1986), Flags at Sea, Her Majesty's Stationery Office
- MTP 1(D), Volume II - Multinational Maritime Tactical Signal and Maneuvering Book (PDF), NATO, March 2003
