= Russian Navy Code of Signals =

Collection of flaghoist signals used by the Russian Navy

The Russian Navy Code of Signals is a collection of flaghoist signals, which is used together with semaphore alphabet for the transmission of information between the ships of the Russian Navy and also with the shore. Its use resembles that of the signals of other navies but it is only used within the Russian fleet. For communication with foreign or civilian vessels the International Code of Signals is used.

The Russian Navy Code of Signals originates from a similar code of signals used by the Imperial Russian Navy. It was used by the Soviet Navy and with mostly insignificant changes remains in use by the Naval fleet of the Russian Federation.

The complete set of flags consists of 59 flags: 32 flags correspond to the letters of Russian alphabet, 10 flags correspond to numbers, 4 flags are substitutes and 13 have special values.

The flag used by the Soviet Navy for the third substitute was based on the jack of the Imperial Russian Navy. Now that the Russian Federation is again using the old imperial jack, a new flag design is used for the third substitute.

== Letters ==
Flag name	Transliteration	Meaning	Description	International use
А, Аз	Az	Negative Answer	red swallowtail with white rectangle vertically centered at the hoist	
Б, Буки	Buki	“Hoist anchor”, “full speed”	white pennant with red disk	ICS Number 1
В, Веди	Vedi	“Your course leads to danger”	red pennant with blue white-fimbriated triangle set to the hoist	
Г, Глаголь	Glagolʹ	“Enemy in sight”	blue pennant	
Д, Добро	Dobro	Positive answer	yellow flag.	ICS "Quebec"
Е, Есть	Estʹ	“To act independently or according to instruction”	blue pennant with yellow triangle set to the hoist.	ICS first substitute
Ж, Живете	Živete	“half speed”	white flag with red lozenge	ICS "Foxtrot"
З, Земля	Zemlâ	“motion astern”	checkered blue and white flag. Identical to the	ICS "November"
И, Иже	Iže	“Anxiety”, “the alert”	yellow over red horizontal bicolor pennant	ICS Number 7
Й, Иже краткое	Iže Kratkoe	“found mine”	white swallowtail flag with black disc	
K, Како	Kako	“I am going out of order”, “I am not under control”	blue over red horizontal bicolor flag	ICS "Echo"
Л, Люди	Lûdi	“I turn to the left”	white flag with red cross throughout	England
M, Мыслете	Myslete	“slow speed”	checkered red and white flag	
Н, Наш	Naš	I "conduct fire”, I " load ammunition”	red swallowtail	ICS "Bravo"
O, Он	On	“To follow me”, “I request permission…”	yellow pennant with vertical red stripe	ICS Number 0
П, Покой	Pokoj	“To turn to the right”	yellow and blue vertical bicolor	ICS "Kilo"
Р, Рцы	Rcy		horizontal triband of blue, white and blue	ICS "Juliet"
С, Слово	Slovo	“All stop (engines)”	blue flag with white saltire	ICS "Mike"
T, Твердо	Tverdo	“To have a motion… of units”	yellow and black quartered flag	ICS "Lima"
У, Ухо	Uho	I "suffer calamity”	red pennant with two white vertical stripes	ICS answering pennant
Ф, Ферт	Fert	“Cancellation”	yellow flag with black disc	ICS "India"
Х, Хер	Her	“The end of the exercise”	white flag with red couped cross	Red Cross
Ц, Цепочка	Cepočka	“To return to its connection”	red, yellow and blue horizontal triband	
Ч, Червь	Červʹ	“Person(s) overboard”	blue flag with small yellow lozenge	
Ш, Шапка	Šapka	“full speed”	white flag with five blue rectangles, spaced evenly and set per saltire	
Щ, Ща	Ŝa		white pennant with red Scandinavian cross throughout	ICS Number 8
Ъ, Твердый знак	Tvôrdyj Znak		black over white triangular flag, divided horizontally in two equal parts.	ICS Number 6
Ы, Еры	Ery		black flag with white ascending diagonal stripe	
Ь, Мягкий знак	Mâkhkij Znak		blue and white pennant, divided vertically	ICS second substitute
Э, Э оборотное	È Oborotnoe		flag with five horizontal stripes, of blue, white, red, white and blue.	ICS "Charlie"
Ю, Юла	Ûla		white flag with red saltire	ICS "Victor"
Я, Яко	Âko	“dead slow”	red flag with yellow cross	ICS "Romeo"

== Digits ==
Flag name	Transliteration	Meaning	Description	International use
1 единица	edinica	Decimal Digit 1	White beside blue vertical swallowtail bicolor.	ICS "Alpha"
2 двойка	dvojka	Decimal Digit 2	Blue triangular pennant with white disk	ICS Number 2
3 тройка	trojka	Decimal Digit 3	Pennant divided vertically into red/white/blue.	ICS Number 3
4 четверка	četverka	Decimal Digit 4	Red pennant with white Scandinavian cross.	ICS Number 4
5 пятёрка	pâtërka	Decimal Digit 5	Pennant divided vertically into yellow beside blue.	ICS Number 5
6 шестёрка	šestërka	Decimal Digit 6	Red over yellow divided per bend dexter (from top-left to bottom-right)	ICS "Oscar"
7 семёрка	semërka	Decimal Digit 7	Red/white/blue vertical triband	ICS "Tango"
8 восьмёрка	vosʹmërka	Decimal Digit 8	Red/White counterchanged quarters per cross	ICS "Uniform"
9 девятка	devâtka	Decimal Digit 9	White with blue cross	ICS "X-ray"
0 ноль	nolʹ	Decimal Digit 0	Four colors divided per saltire consisting of yellow/blue/red/black	ICS "Zulu"

== Substitutes and special flags ==
Flag name	Transliteration	Meaning	Description	International use
1-ый дополнительный	1-yj dopolnitelʹnyj	1st substitute	red rectangle with the white border against the dark-blue background	ICS "Whiskey"
2-ой дополнительный	2-оj dopolnitelʹnyj	2nd substitute	red slanting strips against a yellow background	ICS "Yankee"
3-ий дополнительный	3-ij dopolnitelʹnyj	3rd substitute (Soviet era)	Russian navy jack with white border	
3-ий дополнительный	3-ij dopolnitelʹnyj	3rd substitute (modern)	white over black flag divided per bend dexter (from top-hoist to bottom-fly)	
4-ый дополнительный	4-yj dopolnitelʹnyj	4th substitute	Pennant quartered white, black, red and yellow.	ICS Number 9
Гюйс	Gûjs	Soviet Navy Jack	red flag with white hammer and sickle surrounded by white outline of a star	
Газ	Gaz	poison gases	black flag with the white-bordered red triangle	
Дым	Dym	smoke screen	white pennant with the black horizontal stripe	ICS 3rd Substitute
Телеграфный	Telegrafnyj	telegraphic code	yellow and blue vertical strips	ICS "Golf"
Шлюпочный	Šlûpočnyj	lower boats	dark-blue flag with the white rectangle in the center	ICS "Papa"
Воздушный	Vozdušnyj	airplanes	white flag with the blue rectangle in the center	ICS "Sierra"
Норд	Nord	North	white flag with red inverted triangle	
Зюйд	Zûjd	South	white flag with black triangle	
Ост	Ost	East	white flag with black lozenge	
Вест	Vest	West	Red/white quarters divided per saltire	
Вопросительный	Voprostelʹnyj	interrogative flag	yellow, blue and yellow horizontal stripes	ICS "Delta"
Ответный	Otvestnyj	reciprocal flag. Raised to half mast when a signal is noticed. Raised the rest of the way up when the signal is deciphered.	red pennant with white disk	
Исполнительный	Ispolnitelʹnyj	executive	vertical bicolor white and red	ICS "Hotel"
