= Andrew Knight =

Andrew Knight is the name of:

- Andrew Knight (journalist) (born 1939), English journalist, editor, and director of News Corporation
- Andrew Knight (politician) (1813–1904), politician in colonial Victoria, Australia
- Andrew Knight (writer) (born 1953), Australian TV writer and producer
