= Edward Nucella Emmett =

Australian politician (1817–1874)

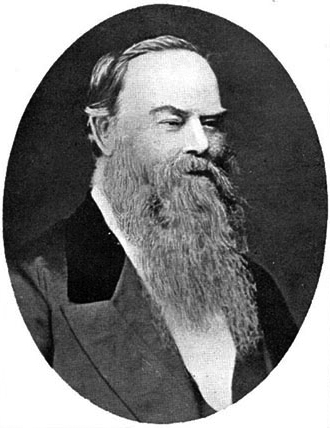
- Born: 18 February 1817; Winchester, London, England
- Died: 18 March 1874 (aged 57); Manly, New South Wales, Australia
- Resting place: Rookwood Cemetery; 33.874121°S 151.058361°E
- Occupations: entrepreneur: auctioneer, banker, gold digger, broker, legal manager, mining agent
- Spouse: Sarah Spottiswood Blackham
- Partner: Sarah Ann Dolby (common law)
- Children: with Sarah Ann Dolby: Sarah Ann Dolby Emmett (1843–1881), Mary Dolby Emmett (1847–1913), Edward Nucella Dolby Emmett (1851–1911), with Sarah Spottiswoode Blackham: Edward Blackham Emmett (1850–1850), Richard Spottiswood William Emmett (1851–1851), Sarah Spottiswood Grace Emmett (1855–1861), Lilly Bannerman Blanche Emmett (1865–1866), Bertha Maud Beatrice Emmett (1868–1939)
- Parent(s): Henry James Emmett and Mary Elizabeth Thompson Emmett (nee Townsend)

Mayor of Sandhurst

Mayor of Raywood

Member of Victorian Legislative Council
- In office from 29 August 1853 but may never have taken up seat

Edward Nucella Emmett (18 February 1817 – 18 March 1874) was an English-born Australian entrepreneur and politician, and briefly a member of the Victorian Legislative Council.

== Career ==
Emmett worked as an auctioneer in Adelaide, South Australia. He lived in Bendigo from 1852 to 1870, working firstly as a gold digger and then as an auctioneer. He was said to have discovered the Hustler's Reef near Bendigo. With Hugh Smith, he established the Bendigo Bank (subsequently purchased by the then Bank of Victoria). He later started a brewery and a number of mining companies. To secure Bendigo's future, Emmett worked to establish a reliable water supply, and was the main promoter of the Bendigo Waterworks Company (now part of Coliban Water), established in 1858.

Given the financial problems of the Victorian colonial government, and the lack of local government funds, he worked to privately fund the new water supply. The Sandhurst (Bendigo) council controlled a 22-acre water reserve site along the Bendigo Creek at Golden Square. With funding from wealthy investors in Melbourne he formed the company which was incorporated by parliament. Joseph Brady was the first engineer for the project, which made use of water from the Coliban River.

He went to Sydney after 1870, where he was a broker, legal manager and mining agent.

=== Government ===
Emmett was nominated as a Member of the Victorian Legislative Council from 29 August 1853 to September 1853, but resigned in early September, after being rejected by a gold diggers' meeting and may never have taken his seat. He was first chairman of the Sandhurst (Bendigo) municipal council and, subsequently, of the municipality of Raywood, of which he was also the first chairman.

After the sale of the bank, he acted in a number of official roles, including town valuator, and conducted first government land sales. He was a member of first local court (1855), and mining registrar at Raywood (1863).

== Family ==
Emmett was the son of Henry James Emmett and Mary Elizabeth Thompson Emmett (née Townsend) who immigrated to Van Diemen's Land from England with their young family in 1819, fifteen years after the establishment of Hobart Town (1804).

He had two families in South Australia, abandoning his common law wife, Sarah Ann Dolby, and their three children before the end of 1856. He had married Sarah Spottiswood Blackham in 1849 and moved with her to Bendigo (then called Sandhurst).

After his death, his widow and their only surviving daughter, Bertha, returned to Bendigo, where in 1876 it became known that they were in straitened circumstance with a number of gifts made to them. Later in that year she married Archibald Forsyth.

Victorian Legislative Council
New seat	Nominated member 29 August 1853 – 6 September 1853	Succeeded by Andrew Knight
