= International Code of Signals =

Maritime communication method

How to say "Communicate with me!" in nine languages.

The International Code of Signals (INTERCO) is an international system of signals and codes for use by vessels to communicate important messages regarding safety of navigation and related matters. Signals can be sent by flaghoist, signal lamp ("blinker"), flag semaphore, radiotelegraphy, and radiotelephony. The International Code is the most recent evolution of a wide variety of maritime flag signalling systems.

== History ==
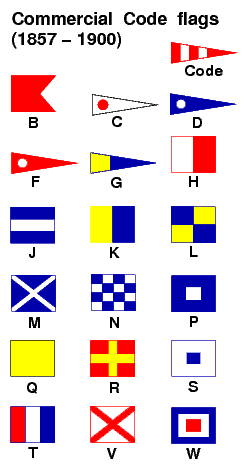
Commercial code flags until 1900

The International Code of Signals was preceded by a variety of naval signals and private signals, most notably Marryat's Code, the most widely used code flags prior to 1857. What is now the International Code of Signals was drafted in 1855 by the British Board of Trade and published in 1857 as the Commercial Code. It came in two parts: the first containing universal and international signals, and the second British signals only. Eighteen separate signal flags (see chart) were used to make over 70,000 possible messages. Vowels were omitted from the set to avoid spelling out any word that might be objectionable in any language, and some little-used letters were also omitted. It was revised by the Board of Trade in 1887, and was modified at the International Conference of 1889 in Washington, D.C. The new international code of signals officially came into worldwide operation on 1 January 1901. At first it was used concurrently with the old system until 1 January 1902, and then used exclusively after 1 January 1903. In this new edition, the number of flags was increased from 18 flags plus a code pennant to 26 flags and a code pennant. The eight new flags represented the vowels A E I O U and the letters X Y Z.

A slightly different version was published in Brown's Signalling, 18th Edition, February, 1916, pages 9–28. Charlie, Delta, Echo, Foxtrot and Golf were pennants corresponding to more modern numeral pennants 1, 2, 3, 4 and 5. Otherwise the letters appear to correspond to the more modern formats.

The code was severely tested during World War I, and it was found that, "when coding signals, word by word, the occasions upon which signaling failed were more numerous than those when the result was successful." A 1920 meeting of the five Principal Allied and Associated Powers met in Paris and proposed forming the Universal Electrical Communications Union on October 8, 1920, in Washington, D.C. The group suggested revisions to the International Code of Signals, and adopted a phonetic spelling alphabet, but the creation of the organization was not agreed upon.

The 1927 International Radiotelegraph Conference in Washington considered proposals for a new revision of the Code, including preparation in seven languages: English, French, Italian, German, Japanese, Spanish, and Norwegian. This new edition was completed in 1930 and was adopted by the International Radiotelegraph Conference held in Madrid in 1932. The Madrid Conference also set up a standing committee for continual revision of the code. The new version introduced vocabulary for aviation and a complete medical section with the assistance and by the advice of the Office International d'Hygiène Publique. A certain number of signals were also inserted for communications between vessels and shipowners, agents, repair yards, and other maritime stakeholders. The new international code of signals was officially brought into force worldwide on 1 January 1934. Thirteen new flags were introduced, whereby the triangular pennants used for letters, C, D, E, F, and G were replaced with new square flags, and became the numerals 1, 2, 3, 4, and 5. The numerals 6, 7, 8, 9, and 0 were introduced by five new flags, and there were three new substitute flags added.

After World War II, the 1947 International Radio Conference of the International Telecommunication Union suggested in that the International Code of Signals should fall within the competence of the Inter-Governmental Maritime Consultative Organization (IMCO), which became the IMO. In January 1959, the First Assembly of IMCO decided that the organization should assume all the functions then being performed by the Standing Committee of the International Code of Signals.

The Second Assembly of IMCO 1961 endorsed plans for a comprehensive review of the International Code of Signals to meet the needs of mariners. The revisions were prepared in the previous seven languages plus Russian and Greek.

The code was revised in 1964 taking into account recommendations from the 1960 Conference on Safety of Life at Sea (SOLAS) and the 1959 Administrative Radio Conference. Changes included a shift in focus from general communications to safety of navigation, abandonment of the "vocabulary" method of spelling out messages word by word, adaptation to all forms of communication, and elimination of the separate radiotelegraph and geographical sections. It was adopted in 1965. The 1969 English-language version of the code (United States edition, revised 2020) is available online through the National Geospatial-Intelligence Agency (NGA, formerly the National Imagery and Mapping Agency) and can be found here.

The International Code of Signals is currently maintained by the International Maritime Organization (IMO), which published an edition in 2005.

== Standards ==
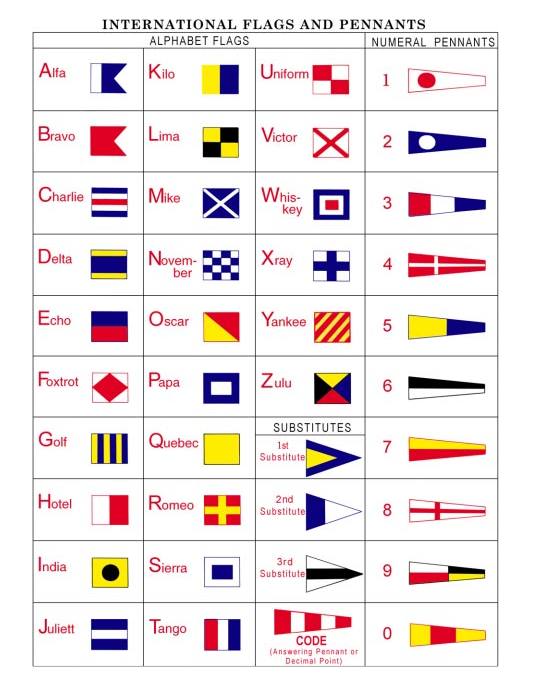
Standard chart of "International Flags and Pennants" of the International Code of Signals (also known as "Pub. 102")

"The purpose of the International Code of Signals is to provide ways and means of communication in situations related essentially to safety of navigation and persons, especially when language difficulties arise." It has done this by first establishing a standardized alphabet (the letters A to Z and the ten digits), along with a spoken form of each letter (to avoid confusing similar-sounding letters, such as b, p, and v), and associating this alphabet with standardized flags. (See chart to the right.)

Combinations of these alphanumeric characters are assigned as codes for various standardized messages. For instance, the master of a ship may wish to communicate with another ship, where their own radio may not be working or the other ship's call sign is not known or the other ship may not be maintaining a radio watch. One simply raises the Kilo flag (see diagram at the top), or sends the Morse Code equivalent (dash-dot-dash) by flashing light; this has the assigned message of "I wish to communicate with you."

One practical benefit of using the ICS is that all of the standardized messages come in nine languages (English, French, Italian, German, Japanese, Spanish, Norwegian, and, since 1969, Russian and Greek). This solves the problems which may potentially arise when the sender and the receiver(s) of a message are fluent only in differing languages; each language has a book with equivalent messages keyed to the same code. This is also useful in radiotelephony, or even when ships are within hailing distance, if there is no common language. A crew member on a burning ship could yell, "Yuliet alfa vore", to a ship which has come to offer aid, in order to communicate exactly what the distressed ship needs—in this case, "material [foaming agent] for use in foam fire extinguishers". (See de:Flaggenalphabet for the German version of single-letter signals.)

The code also covers procedural aspects (how to initiate a call, the format of a message, how to format date and time, etc.), how naval ships (which usually use their own codes) indicate that they are using the ICS (by flying the code pennant), use in radiotelephony (use of the spoken word "Interco"), and various other matters (such as how an aircraft directs a vessel to another vessel in distress and how to order unidentified submarines to surface).

== Signals ==
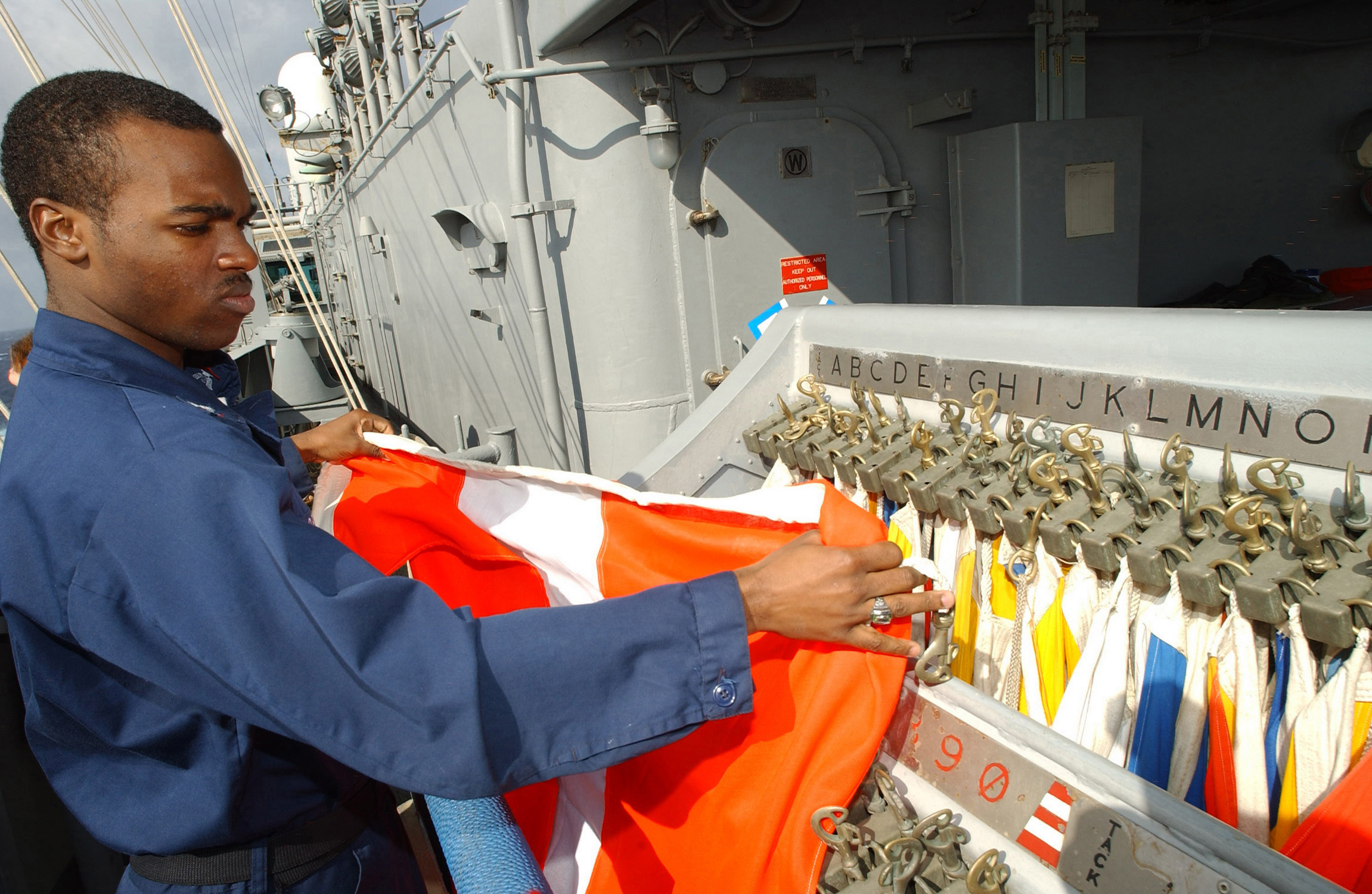
A sailor on board a US Navy ship preparing a signal hoist

Prior to 1969, the code was much more extensive, covering a wider range of messages and including a list of five-letter codes for every prominent maritime location in the world. Since 1969, it has been reduced to focus on navigation and safety, including a medical section. Signals can be sorted into three groups:

- Single-letter signals which are very urgent, important, or common.
- Two-letter signals for other messages, sometimes followed with a numerical "complement" which supplements or modifies the message.
- Three-letter signals beginning with "M"; these are the Medical Signal Codes.

In some cases, additional characters are added to indicate quantities, bearing, course, distance, date, time, latitude, or longitude. There is also provision for spelling words and for indicating use of other codes. Several of the most common single-letter signals are shown at the right. Two-letter signals cover a broad gamut of situations.

Repeated characters can be a problem in flaghoist. To avoid having to carry multiple sets of signal flags, the Code uses three "substitute" (or "repeater") flags. These repeat the flag at the indicated position. For instance, to signal MAA ("I request urgent medical advice") the Mike, Alfa, and 2nd substitute flags would be flown, the substitute indicating a repeat of the second character.

== Medical Signal Code ==
A hoist of three flags
| Flag hoist | Code | Meaning |
|---|---|---|
| | MAA | I request urgent medical advice. |
The pennant at the bottom indicates a repeat of the second letter.

The Medical Signal Code (incorporated in the International Code of Signals since 1930) is a means of providing assistance when medical personnel are not present. Plain language is generally preferred in such cases (presumably via radiotelephone), but the various codes provide a succinct method of communicating to a doctor the nature of the problem where there are language or communication difficulties, and in return the recommended treatment. Even where there are no language problems, the Medical Signal Code is useful in providing a standard method of case description and treatment. There is also a standard list of medicaments (medicines), keyed to a standard ships medicine chest carried by all merchant ships. The Medical signals all begin with the letter "M" (Mike) followed by two more letters, and sometimes with additional numerals or letters.

== Single-flag signals ==
| Letter, spelling word, pronunciation | Flag | Meaning | |
| Letter, spelling word, pronunciation | Flag | As single flag | With numeric complements |
|---|---|---|---|
| A Alfa [ˈal.fa] | | "I have a diver down; keep well clear at slow speed." | Azimuth or bearing |
| B Bravo [ˈbrɑː.voʊ] | | "I am taking in or discharging or carrying dangerous goods." (Originally used by the Royal Navy specifically for military explosives.) | |
| C Charlie [ˈtʃɑː.li] | | "Affirmative." (Note: N and C together (No and Yes) is used as a distress signal.) (Note: Also signallable on a ship's whistle using Morse code. See International Code of Signals.) | Course in degrees magnetic (Three digits denote degrees. Utilizes leading zeroes for values below 100.) |
| D Delta [ˈdɛl.tə] | | "Keep clear of me; I am maneuvering with difficulty." | Date (The first 2 digits denote the day; the next 2 digits denote the month; and 2 other digits to denote the last two digits of the year if necessary. Utilizes leading zeroes for single-digit values.) |
| E Echo [ˈɛk.oʊ] | | "I am altering my course to starboard." | |
| F Foxtrot [ˈfɔks.trɔt] | | "I am disabled; communicate with me." | |
| G Golf [gɔlf] | | "I require a pilot." By fishing vessels near fishing grounds: "I am hauling nets." | Longitude (The first 2 or 3 digits denote degrees; the last 2 denote minutes.) |
| H Hotel [hoʊˈtɛl] | | "I have a pilot on board." | |
| I India [ˈɪn.dɪə] | | "I am altering my course to port." | |
| J Juliet [ˈdʒuː.ljɛt] | | "I am on fire and have dangerous cargo on board: keep well clear of me." or "I am leaking dangerous cargo." | |
| K Kilo [ˈki.loʊ] | | "I wish to communicate with you." | "I wish to communicate with you by...": 1) Morse signaling by hand-flags or arms; 2) Loud hailer (megaphone); 3) Morse signaling lamp; 4) Sound signals. |
| L Lima [ˈli.mə] | | "You should stop your vessel instantly." | Latitude (The first 2 digits denote degrees; the last 2 denote minutes.) |
| M Mike [maɪk] | | "My vessel is stopped and making no way through the water." | |
| N November [noʊˈvɛm.bə] | | "Negative." | |
| O Oscar [ˈɔs.kə] | | "Man overboard." (often attached to the man overboard pole on boats). With a sinister hoist, the semaphore flag. | |
| P Papa [ˈpa.pə] | | The Blue Peter. In harbour: All persons should report on board as the vessel is about to proceed to sea. At sea: It may be used by fishing vessels to mean: "My nets have come fast upon an obstruction." | |
| Q Quebec [kəˈbɛk] | | "My vessel is 'healthy' and I request free pratique." | |
| R Romeo [ˈroʊ.mjoʊ] | | No ICS meaning as single flag. Prior to 1969: "The way is off my ship; you may feel your way past me." | Distance (range) in nautical miles. |
| S Sierra [siˈɛrə] | | "I am operating astern propulsion." | Speed (velocity) in knots |
| T Tango [ˈtaŋ.goʊ] | | "Keep clear of me; I am engaged in pair trawling." | Local time. (The first 2 digits denote hours; the last 2 denote minutes.) |
| U Uniform [ˈjuː.nɪ.fɔːm] | | "You are running into danger." | |
| V Victor [ˈvɪk.tə] | | "I require assistance." | Speed in kilometres per hour. |
| W Whiskey [ˈwɪs.ki] | | "I require medical assistance." | |
| X Xray [ˈɛks.reɪ] | | "Stop carrying out your intentions and watch for my signals." | |
| Y Yankee [ˈjaŋ.ki] | | "I am dragging my anchor." | |
| Z Zulu [ˈzuː.luː] | | "I require a tug." By fishing vessels near fishing grounds: "I am shooting nets." (Note: The Z flag was also famously hoisted by Adm. Heihachiro Togo at the 1905 Battle of Tsushima as the Japanese fleet prepared to engage the Russian fleet. In Japanese coding at the time, the flag meant, "The Empire's fate depends on the result of this battle, let every man do his utmost duty.") | (UTC). The first 2 digits denote hours; the last 2 denote minutes. |
Numerals
| 0 Nadazero [ˌna.daˈzɪə.roʊ] | | This and following used as numbers to complement other signals. | |
| 1 Unaone [ˌuː.nəˈwʌn] | | | |
| 2 Bissotwo [ˌbɪs.oʊˈtuː] | | | |
| 3 (Note: The "th" is pronounced simply "t" for clarity.); Terrathree [ˌtɛr.əˈtri] | | | |
| 4 Kartefour [ˌkɑː.təˈfɔː.wə] | | | |
| 5 (Note: The "v" is pronounced "f" for clarity.); Pantafive [ˌpan.təˈfaɪf] | | | |
| 6 Soxisix [ˌsɔk.siˈsɪks] | | | |
| 7 Setteseven [ˌsɛ.təˈsɛv.ən] | | | |
| 8 Oktoeight [ˌɔk.toʊˈeɪt] | | | |
| 9 (Note: Final schwa ("niner"), originally used to differentiate "nine" from "five" in previous English-only version.); Novenine [ˌnoʊ.veˈnaɪ.nə] | | | |
Various
| 1st Substitute | | Used to repeat the first flag of a hoist later within the same hoist. This and the other two substitutes allows any four letter or number combination to be sent using only one set of flags. | |
| 2nd Substitute | | Used to repeat the second flag of a hoist later within the same hoist. | |
| 3rd Substitute | | Used to repeat the third flag of a hoist later within the same hoist. | |
| Code/Answer; Pennant | | At the dip (about half-way up the halyard): Ready to receive message Close up: Message has been received and understood (the flag is then hauled back at the dip to receive the next hoist); Hauled down: Signals end of message. With numerals: Decimal point By a warship: When flown over a hoist, indicates the message is to be read according to the ICS. | |

== Examples of multiple-flag signals ==
Sample International Code of Signals messages
| Flag | Code | Meaning | Note |
|---|---|---|---|
| | AC | I am abandoning my vessel. | |
| | AD | I am abandoning my vessel which has suffered a nuclear accident and is a possible source of radiation danger. | |
| | AN | I need a doctor. | |
| | AN 1 | I need a doctor; I have severe burns. | |
| | AN 2 | I need a doctor; I have radiation casualties. | |
| | EL | Repeat the distress position. | |
| | EL 1 | What is the position of vessel in distress? | |
| | GM | I cannot save my vessel. | |
| | GN | You should take off persons. | |
| | GN 1 | I wish some persons taken off. Skeleton crew will remain on board. | |
| | GN 2 | I will take off the people. | |
| | GN 3 | Can you take off people? | |
| | IT | I am on fire. | |
| | JA | I require firefighting appliances. | |
| | JA 4 | I require material for foam fire extinguishers. | |
| | MAA | I request urgent medical advice. | |
| | MAB | I request you to make rendezvous in position indicated. | |
| | MAC | I request you to arrange hospital admission. | |
| | MAD | I am . . . (indicate number) hours from the nearest port. | Number after. |
| | MS 1 | My vessel is a dangerous source of radiation; you may approach from my starboard side. | |
| | VG | The coverage of low clouds is... (number of octants or eighths of sky covered). | Look up and add number. |
| | US 4 | Nothing can be done until weather moderates. | |
| | NC | I am in distress and require immediate assistance (Distress signal). | |
| | RY | Keep clear at slow speed. | |
| | AE | I must abandon my vessel. | |
| | DX | I am sinking. | |

== See also ==
- Flaghoist signalling
- List of international common standards
- International maritime signal flags
- Maritime flag signalling
- NATO phonetic alphabet
- Naval flag signalling
- Russian Navy Code of Signals
- Spelling alphabet

== Sources ==
- The International Code of Signals for the Use of All Nations, Board of Trade [Great Britain], 1872
- The International Code of Signals for the Use of All Nations, U.S. Navy Hydrographic Office, 1890
- The 1931 International Code of Signals, American Edition (Reprinted 1937) Vol. I (H.O. 87), U.S. Navy Hydrographic Office, 1931
- International Code of Signals for Visual, Sound, and Radio Communications, United States Edition, 1969 (Revised 2003) (PDF), 1969
- International Code of Signals, 2005 ed. (IMO IA994E), IMO – International Maritime Organization, 2005, ISBN 978-92-801-4198-6
- Mead, H. P. (1934), "The History of the International Code", U.S. Naval Institute Proceedings, 60 (378): 1083–8
