= Z flag =

International maritime signal flag

The Z flag is a diagonally quartered square consisting of four isosceles triangles with their apexes meeting in the center of the square – a yellow triangle on the top, blue at the fly (right), red on the bottom, black at the hoist (left). It is the only flag in the international maritime flag set to use four colors. In heraldry, it would be described as Per saltire or, sable, gules and azure

The Z flag is one of the international maritime signal flags.

== International maritime signal flag ==
In the system of international maritime signal flags, part of the International Code of Signals, the Z flag stands for the letter Z ("Zulu" in the NATO Alphabet) when used in letter-by-letter alphabetic communication. When used alone, it means "I require a tug" or, when used by fishing vessels near fishing grounds, "I am shooting nets".

The Z flag when combined with four number flags (The leading two denoting hours, the trailing two denoting minutes) indicates Z Time (also called Zulu Time), a military and maritime term for Coordinated Universal Time (UTC)+0 (also known as Greenwich Mean Time (GMT)) expressed on a 24 hour clock. Thus this would mean 0800Z ("zero eight hundred zulu") equivalent to 08:00 UTC:
Or, more likely, the same information would be conveyed using repeat flags:

Under yacht racing rules, display of the Z flag indicates that a particular false start rule, the 20% Penalty Rule 30.2, is in effect: a boat on the course side (OCS) – that is, over the starting line – during the minute before the start will receive a 20% scoring penalty.

== In Japan ==
=== Military uses ===
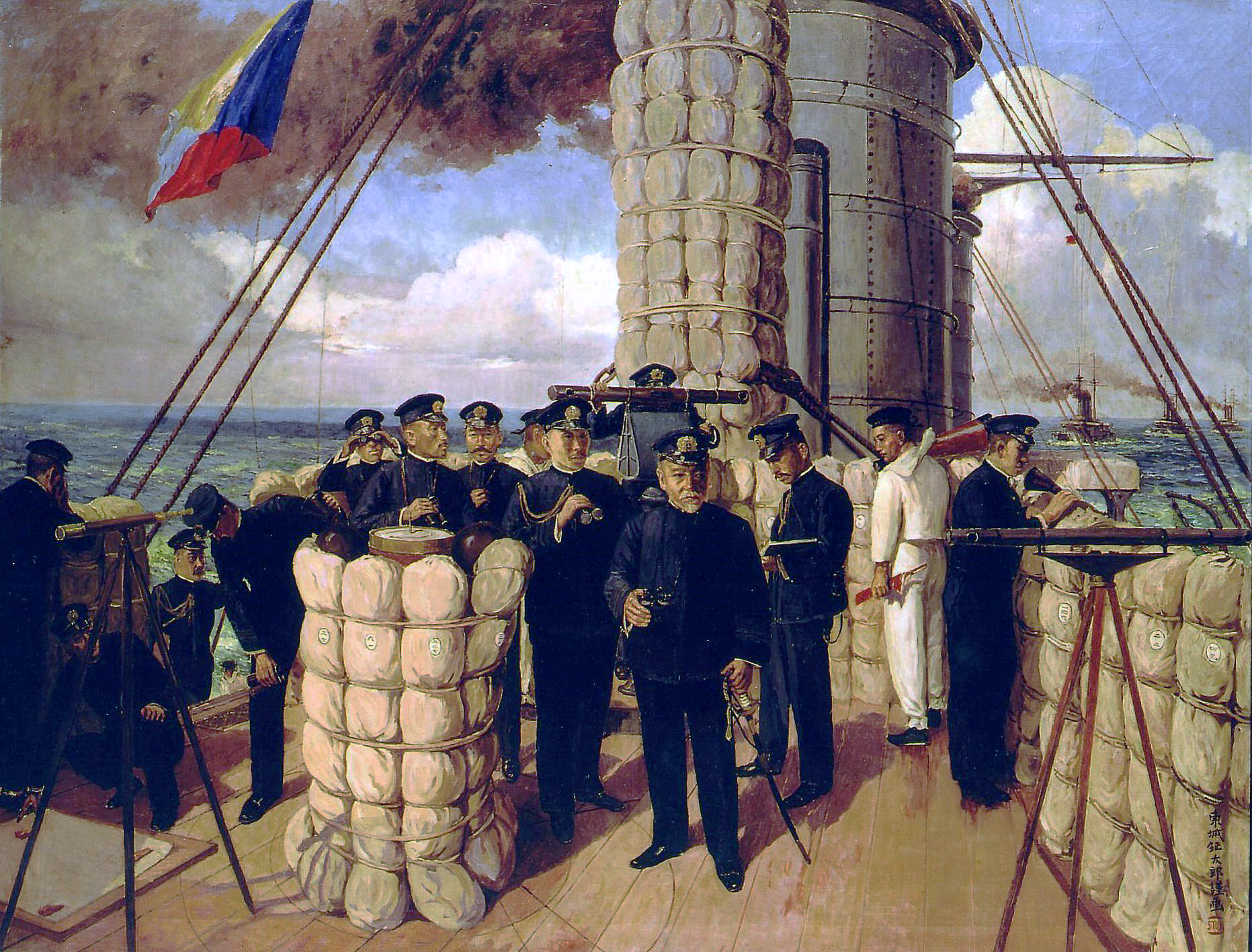
Z flag being raised at Tsushima

The Z flag has special meaning in Japan (as well as in naval history generally) due to its connection with and symbolizing of the Japanese victory at the Battle of Tsushima.

At the Battle of Tsushima on May 27, 1905, Admiral Tōgō raised a Z flag on his flagship Mikasa. By prearrangement, this flag flown alone meant, "The fate of the Empire rests on the outcome of this battle. Let each man do his utmost." (皇國ノ興廢此ノ一戰ニ在リ、各員一層奮勵努力セヨ). The Battle of Tsushima was one of the most important naval battles of history and this signal is, along with Nelson's signal "England expects that every man will do his duty" at the Battle of Trafalgar, one of the two most famous naval flag signals; the battle is of especial importance in Japanese national mythology.

According to Mitsuo Fuchida, the Z flag was raised on Vice-Admiral Nagumo's flagship Akagi before the aircraft were flown off for the 1941 Attack on Pearl Harbor (called Operation Z in its planning stages), explicitly referencing Tōgō's historic victory.

The carrier turned to port and headed into the northerly wind. The battle flag was now added to the 'Z' flag flying at the masthead... On the flight deck a green lamp was waved in a circle to signal 'Take off!'

— Mitsuo Fuchida, I Led the Air Attack on Pearl Harbor

But John Toland, in his Pulitzer Prize-winning work The Rising Sun, maintains, though, that the Z flag was raised only briefly:

Admiral Kusaka ordered the Z flag raised above the Akagi. This was an exact copy of the one Tōgō had used at Tsushima, but in the intervening years it had become an ordinary tactical signal... several staff officers, including Genda, protested when they saw it go up. It would cause confusion. Reluctantly Kusaka revoked the command and ordered another flag raised that vaguely resembled Tōgō's signal.

— John Toland, The Rising Sun

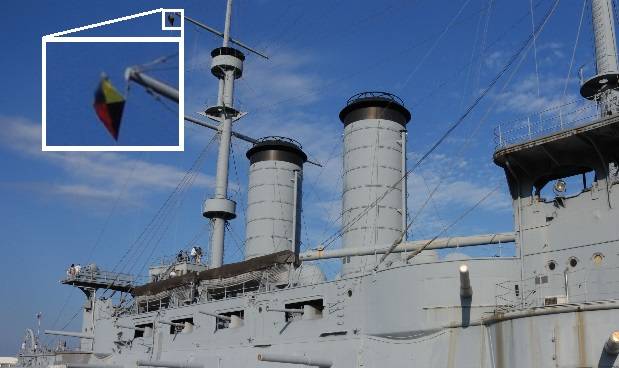
The Z flag (upper left) is still flown daily from the signal yardarm of Mikasa, now a museum ship

According to Toland, the Z flag was also raised on Akagi at the Battle of Midway and from the doomed flagship Zuikaku of Ozawa's sacrificial Northern Force at the Battle off Cape Engaño.

According to Lieutenant Commander (later Admiral) Sadeo Chigusa, executive officer of the escorting Japanese destroyer Akigumo, the D and G flags were raised aboard Akagi before the Pearl Harbor attack, as these flags together had in 1941 the same meaning as the Z flag in 1905.

According to Samuel Eliot Morison, the Z flag flown at Pearl Harbor was the actual one used at Tsushima. However, the Tōgō Shrine in Tokyo claims that its Z flag is Togo's original, having been stored in England from 1911 to 2005.

From 1905 to 1945, the Z flag was used as an unofficial naval ensign. This practice was revived in 2011.

=== Other uses ===
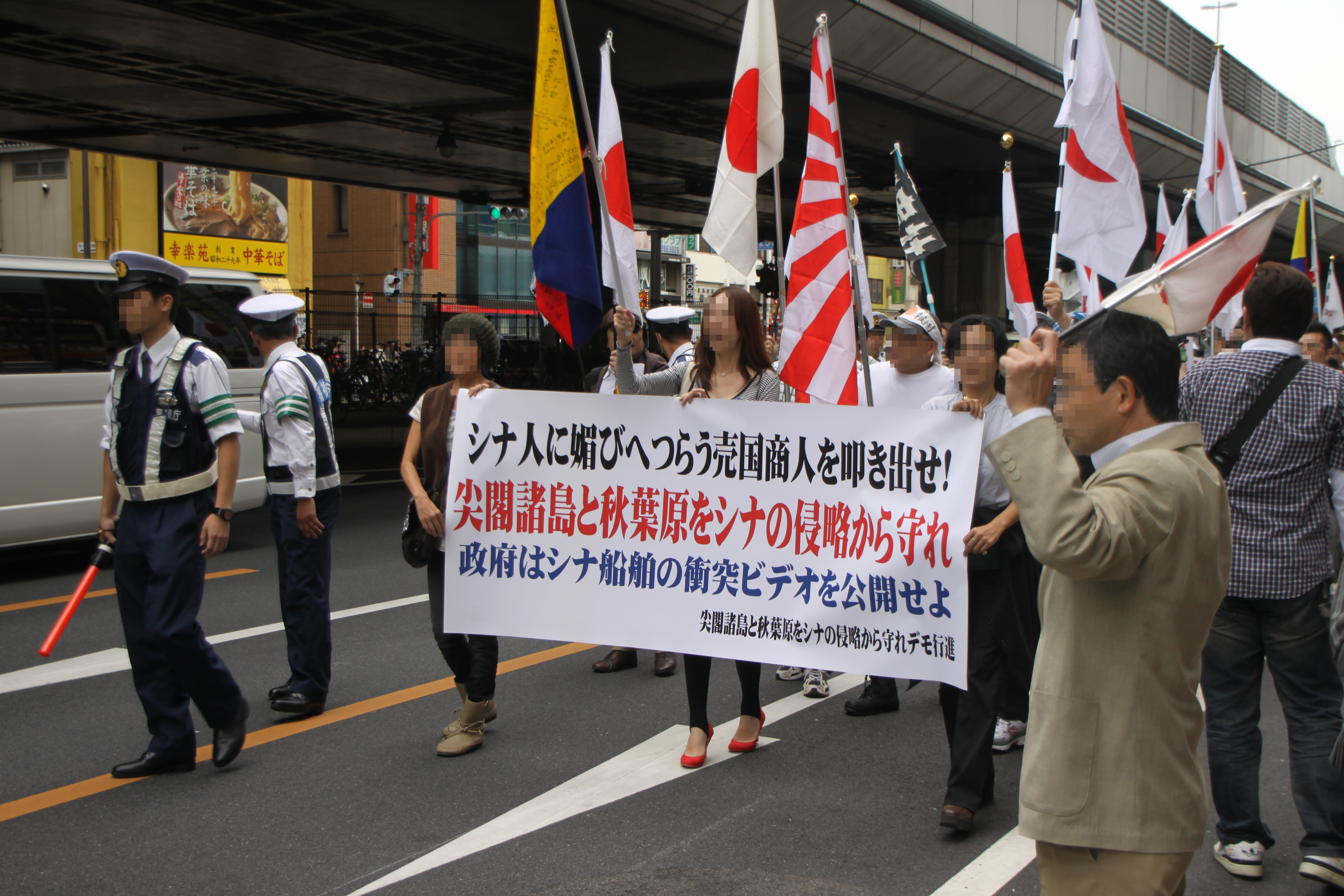
Members of Shuken Kaifuku wo Mezasu Kai bearing the Z flag and the Rising Sun flag

During Project Z, the development of the Nissan Z-car which broke open the American market for Japanese automobile exports, project leader Yutaka Katayama used the Z flag as an inspirational symbol. During the strong yen crisis, the Nagasaki yards of Oshima Shipbuilding flew the Z flag to inspire the workers. The logo of the Japanese multinational corporation Zuken is partly based on the Z flag.

The Z flag is sometimes waved by fans at Japanese sporting events as an exhortation to victory for their favored team. It is also used as a symbol by some fringe right-wing groups in Japan.

== In Greece ==
In the 1912 Battle of Elli against the Ottoman Navy, the Greek commander, Pavlos Kountouriotis, raised the Z flag as a signal for the independent movement of his flagship, the cruiser Georgios Averof. Leaving the older and slower Hydra-class ironclads behind, the much faster Georgios Averof manoeuvred independently and on its own "crossed the T" of the Ottoman fleet, forcing it to retreat into the Dardanelles. The emblem of the Kortenaer-class frigate Kountouriotis features the Z flag in commemoration of this.

== See also ==
- Operation Z (1944)
