= John Pasco =

English admiral (1774–1853)

Rear-Admiral John Pasco
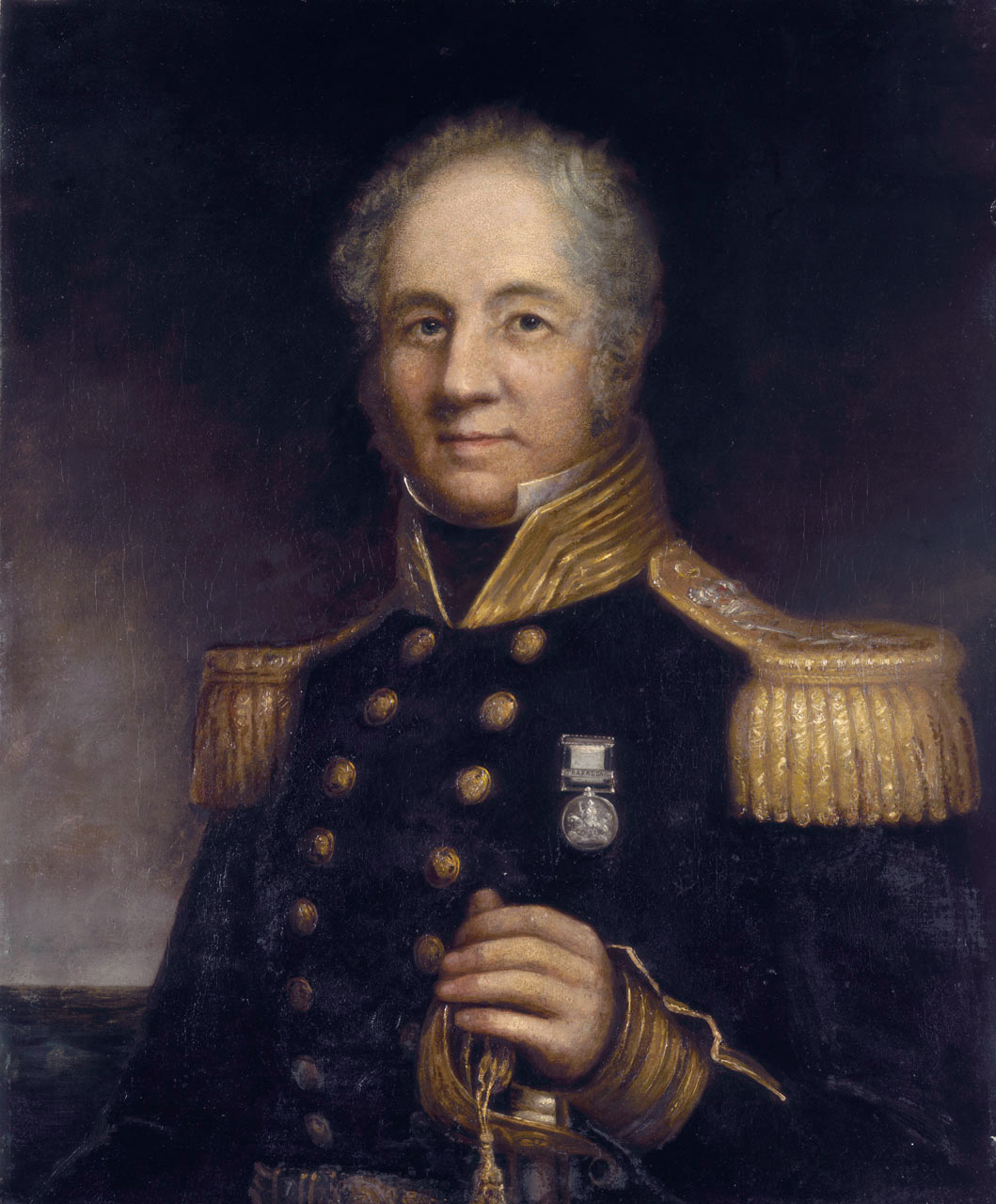
- Rear Admiral John Pasco, ca. 1850
- Born: 20 December 1774; England
- Died: 16 November 1853 (aged 78); East Stonehouse, England
- Relatives: son Crawford Pasco (1818–1898)
- Military career
- Branch: Royal Navy
- Service years: 1784-1853
- Rank: Rear-Admiral
- Conflicts: Battle of Trafalgar

Rear-Admiral John Pasco (1774–1853) served in the Royal Navy between 1784 and 1853, eventually rising to the rank of rear admiral. He acted as signal officer on board HMS Victory at the Battle of Trafalgar and notably advised on the wording of Nelson's famous signal "England expects that every man will do his duty".

== Early life ==
Pasco was born on 20 December 1774 (some accounts say 29 December) and entered the Royal Navy on 4 June 1784 as captain's servant, on HMS Druid. In 1786 he moved to HMS Pegasus, under the command of the then Prince William Henry (later William IV), spending about 12 months on duty in the West Indies and along the coast of North America. He served on various ships after 1787 and by 1790 he had risen to the rank of midshipman under Captain John Manley on HMS Syren. He continued serving on various ships as midshipman and master's mate until 1795, mainly in the English Channel and West Indies.

On 15 July 1795 he was promoted to the rank of lieutenant and assigned to HMS Majestic. In 1796 he joined HMS Beaulieu under Lancelot Skynner (who, three years later, captained HMS Lutine on her last voyage). During his service aboard Beaulieu he assisted in the capture of St Lucia and on 27 December 1799 he became first lieutenant aboard HMS Immortalite. In 1801, while still on Immortalite, he volunteered to command a boat to cut out the French corvette Chevrette from Camaret Bay on the north coast of Brittany; however, bad weather frustrated the plan.

On 7 April 1803 he was assigned to Nelson's flagship HMS Victory. While serving on Victory he assisted in the capture of the French 32-gun frigate Embuscade, was involved in the blockade of Toulon and pursued the French squadrons in the West Indies.

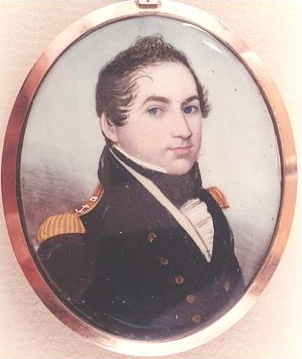
A portrait of Pasco painted around 1805

== Trafalgar ==
On the day of the Battle of Trafalgar Nelson appointed Pasco as signal officer. In this role he was to hoist the famous signal "England expects that every man will do his duty".

Nelson's famous signal, relayed using Popham's "Telegraphic Signals of Marine Vocabulary"

Nelson asked Pasco to send the message "England confides that every man will do his duty". Pasco suggested "expects" be substituted for "confides", since the former was in the signal book, whereas confides would have to be spelt out letter-by-letter. Nelson quickly agreed to the change, Pasco recorded:

His Lordship came to me on the poop, and after ordering certain signals to be made, about a quarter to noon, he said, 'Mr Pasco, I wish to say to the fleet, ENGLAND CONFIDES THAT EVERY MAN WILL DO HIS DUTY' and he added 'You must be quick, for I have one more to make which is for close action'. I replied, 'If your Lordship will permit me to substitute the confides for expects the signal will soon be completed, because the word expects is in the vocabulary, and confides must be spelt', His Lordship replied, in haste, and with seeming satisfaction, 'That will do, Pasco, make it directly'.

Nelson then ordered "Engage the enemy more closely" to be sent. Pasco ran it up and it remained flying until shot away in the battle. Pasco was severely wounded in the right side and arm with grapeshot early in the engagement and was carried below decks.

It was Nelson's personal practice to assign the officer first on his list for promotion to the role of signal officer, and the second on his list to the position of First Lieutenant. John Quilliam, the Sixth Lieutenant, was appointed to the position of First Lieutenant vacated by Pasco's promotion to signal officer during the battle. It is likely that Pasco would have been advanced, but Nelson's death meant standard Navy traditions were followed rather than his personal preferences - Quilliam was promoted to Captain while Pasco and the other lieutenants were only made up to Commander.

At Nelson's state funeral in January 1806 Pasco was given the honour of accompanying the coffin to St Paul's Cathedral with some of the other officers, and one warrant officer (Thomas Atkinson), from the Victory.

== Later life and service ==
With no ship to command and nursing an injury, Pasco returned to land. He had married Rebecca Penfold on 1 September 1805, and would eventually have nine children with her, six sons (two of whom died as children) and three daughters. He remained without a ship on half-pay until 1808. For his injury he received a pension of £250 and a grant from the Lloyd's Patriotic Fund.

In May 1808 he managed to obtain the command of HMS Mediator for three months. In November 1809 he took command of HMS Hindostan and sailed her to New South Wales, with his wife and two of his children accompanying him on the voyage. During the voyage he showed an eagerness in pursuing and engaging any unknown ships, perhaps in an attempt to provide for his growing family from the spoils.

On his return he was appointed to HMS Tartarus where on 3 April 1811 he was appointed captain. Stationed in Halifax, he captured several French and American vessels including in August 1811, an American slave schooner named Severn, which became the highly successful British privateer Liverpool Packet.

In June 1815 he assumed command of HMS Rota in Lisbon. Then on 20 August 1815, he transferred to HMS Lee, stationed in the English Channel. During this last appointment he took several smuggling vessels. He remained captain of Lee until she was paid off in September 1818.

Thereafter, Pasco remained without a ship for almost 30 years. Still, on 19 February 1842 he was selected as a recipient of the Captain's Good Service Pension. In 1843 he was married again, to Eliza, the widow of the Royal Marine, Captain Weaver.

In 1846 he was placed in command of HMS Victory at Portsmouth. He was promoted to Rear-Admiral of the Blue on 22 September 1847, Rear-Admiral of the White on 9 October 1849, and Rear-Admiral of the Red sometime in 1852. He died in East Stonehouse on 16 November 1853.

== See also ==
- O'Byrne, William Richard (1849). "Pasco, John" . A Naval Biographical Dictionary . John Murray – via Wikisource.
