= Charles Bradshaw =

Australian politician

Charles Bradshaw (1805 – 18??) was a merchant and politician in colonial Victoria (Australia), a member of the Victorian Legislative Council.

Bradshaw was a merchant in Melbourne from 1843. He was an Auditor for Society of St George in 1845, manager of the Union Bank of Australia 1850-1852 and commissioner Savings Banks in 1859.

Bradshaw was a nominated member of the Victorian Legislative Council from 1 August 1854 replacing Andrew Knight. Bradshaw remained a member until the original unicameral Council was abolished in March 1856.

In December 1860, Bradshaw sailed for England.

Victorian Legislative Council
Preceded by Andrew Knight	Nominated member 1 August 1854 – March 1856	Succeeded by Original Council abolished
