= Crawford Pasco =

Crawford Atchison Denman Pasco
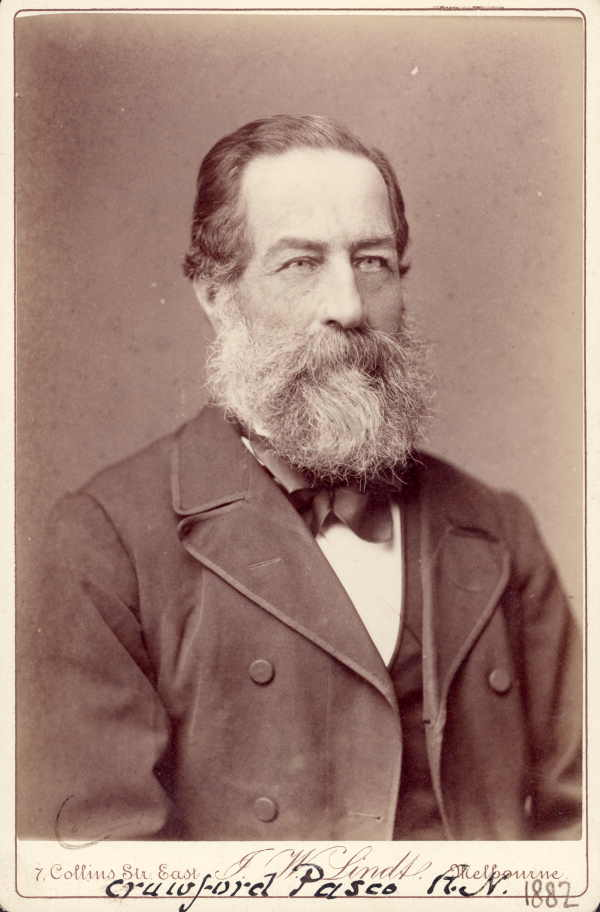
- Born: 17 January 1818; Plymouth Dock, Devon, England
- Died: 18 February 1898 (aged 80); Melbourne, Australia
- Resting place: St Kilda Cemetery, Australia; 37.861099°S 145.001795°E
- Occupation(s): Naval officer, police magistrate
- Employer(s): Royal Navy, Colonial Government of Victoria
- Spouse(s): Mary Elizabeth Emmett (1820–1863); Francis Emily Barker (1837–1907)
- Children: with Mary Elizabeth: Crawford Perry Bate Pasco (1854–1857) (twins) Pasco (1855–1855); Mary Isabel Penfold Pasco (1855–1893); Grace Pasco (1857–1857) () Pasco (1859–1859); Montague Gordon Charles Pasco (1860–1952); Frederick Claude Coote Pasco (1863–1955) with Francis Emily: Emily Frances Pasco (1868–1939); Alice Josephine Pasco (1869–1920); William Henry Pasco (1871–1961)
- Parent(s): Rear Admiral John Pasco; Rebecca Penfold
- Relatives: son-in-law of Henry James Emmett

Crawford Atchison Denman Pasco (17 January 1818 – 28 February 1898) was a Royal Navy officer and Australian police magistrate during the 19th century.

== Career ==
There were two periods to his career, first as in the Royal Navy:

- He joined aged 12 years, in 1830 and served on:
- HMS Nimrod including the 1832 blockade of the Scheldt during the Portuguese Civil War, and the 1833 Siege of Porto on HMS Tagus
- HMS Blonde and HMS Satellite 1834–37 stationed chiefly off Peru and Chile
- HMS Britomart 1838 under Lieutenant Owen Stanley and sailed to Port Essington to prepare a settlement
- HMS Beagle 1839 under John Clements Wickham, then under John Lort Stokes, engaged in surveying parts of Australia's northern and western coasts, discovering in particular the Adelaide River, the future port of Darwin and the Victoria River
- Colonial cutter Vansittart 1842 for survey work in Bass Strait
- 1843 returned to England and appointed to HMS Vestal sailed via America to the Far East, South Africa, Van Diemen's Land and thence to Canton and Singapore with two million dollars, reparation from the Opium War. He sailed for Penang, subdued a rebellious rajah in Borneo, and then visited the Philippines
- the paddle-steamer HMS Vulture surveying the Canton River and then the Palawan Island area, with renewed contact with Borneo rebels
- 1851 returned to England on leave because of illness
- retired from the navy he settled in Victoria

He wrote in 1846 to the editor of the Hong Kong Register suggesting that P&O might extend its mail steamer services from Singapore to Australia. The letter was republished in the Sydney Morning Herald. and other Australian papers.

In 1852 P&O gave him free passage on the inaugural voyage to Australia of the SS Chusan.

And later in Victoria, Australia:

- 1852 appointed a territorial magistrate, superintendent of water police and resident magistrate at Williamstown After repeated clashes with officers of the hulks, following a board of inquiry, in 1857 he was transferred to Swan Hill
- later he was magistrate at Maryborough, Port Albert and Alexandra
- with many other magistrates he was dismissed on 24 January 1878.

== Retirement ==
Pasco retired in Melbourne and became a founder member of the Victorian branch of the Royal Geographical Society of Australasia in 1884, he was chairman of the first Antarctic Exploration Committee.

In 1885, he published Early exploration of Australia. In 1897 he published A Roving Commission, a vivid account of his naval life.

== Family ==
Crawford Pasco (1818–1898) was the youngest son of Rear Admiral John Pasco and his wife Rebecca, née Penfold.

He was married twice, first to Mary Elizabeth Emmett, daughter of Henry James Emmett and Mary Thompson née Townsend. After the death of his first wife he married Francis Emily Barker, daughter of Dr. Thomas Barker and Francis Alicia née Lauder of Melbourne.

There were nine and three offspring respectively from his marriages.
