= Bravo Zulu =

Naval flag signal meaning "well done"

The flag hoist "Bravo Zulu"

Bravo Zulu (BZ), the combination of the Bravo and Zulu nautical signal flags, is a naval signal, typically conveyed by flaghoist or voice radio, meaning "well done" with regard to actions, operations or performance. In addition to its use in the Royal Navy, it has also been used as vernacular slang within the U.S. Navy, NATO, and other Allied naval forces. It can be combined with the "negative" signal, spoken or written as NEGAT, to say "NEGAT Bravo Zulu" to convey "not well done" for a given action.

"BZ" is widely used as shorthand vernacular amongst members of the sea services (i.e., navies, marines, and those coast guards that are military services as opposed to civilian agencies). In the Royal Navy, when the sovereign wishes to reward the crew of a British warship with the order to "splice the mainbrace", i.e., providing the crew with an additional rum ration, it is ordinarily followed simply with the signal or statement "Bravo Zulu."

== History ==
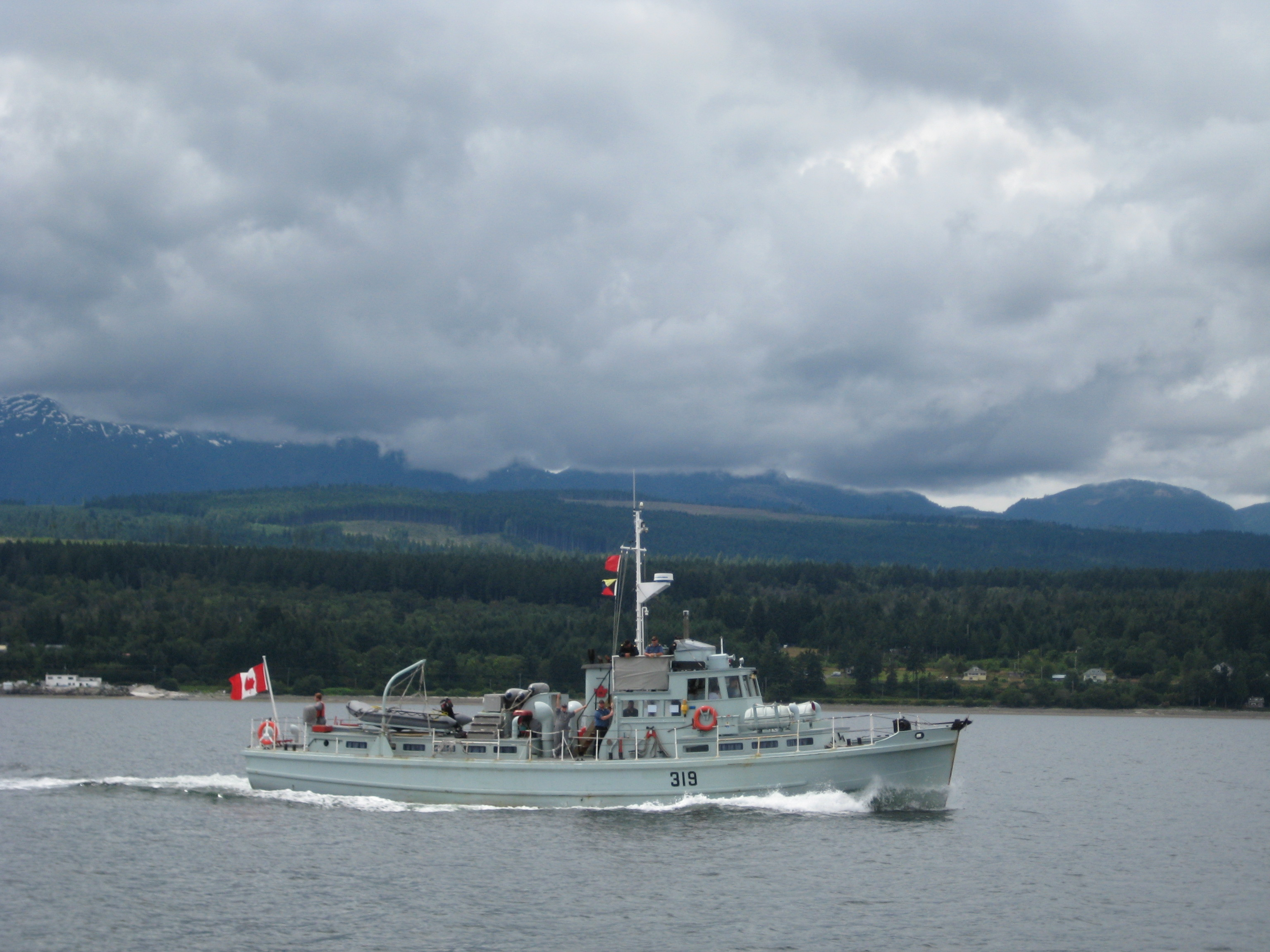
A Royal Canadian Navy ship flying "Bravo Zulu" signal.

According to the U.S. Navy "Navy Data" reference website: "The term BRAVO ZULU originates from the Allied Tactical Publication 1 (ATP 1), an Allied military maritime tactical signals publication, which in the aggregate is For Official Use Only (FOUO), now known in the U.S. Department of Defense as Controlled Unclassified Information (CUI), and can also be found in Multinational Maritime Tactical Publication 2 (MTP 2). Signals are sent as letters and/or numbers, which have meanings by themselves sometimes or in certain combinations. A single table in ATP 1 is called governing groups, that is, the entire signal that follows the governing group is to be interpreted according to the governor. The letter 'B' indicates table B lookup, and the second letter ('A' through 'Z') gives a more specific message. For example, 'BA' might mean "You have permission to ..." (do whatever the rest of the flashing light, hoisted flags, or radio transmission says). 'BZ' happens to be the last item of the governing groups table B and it means "well done".

'Bravo Zulu' is also defined by the Allied Naval Signal Book (ACP 175 series), an international naval signal code adopted after the North Atlantic Treaty Organization (NATO) was created during 1949. Until then, each navy in NATO had used its own separate signal code and operational manuals. World War II experience had shown that it was difficult or impossible for ships of different navies to operate together unless they could communicate readily, and the implementation of ACP 175 was designed to remedy this.

== Personal congratulations ==
In addition to flaghoist and military voice radio, use of the term BRAVO ZULU has also been extended in contemporary times to include written correspondence, message traffic and email traffic.

In the Royal Navy, Royal Marines, Royal Australian Navy, Royal Canadian Navy, Royal New Zealand Navy, Marine nationale (French Navy), U.S. Navy, U.S. Marine Corps, U.S. Coast Guard, National Oceanographic and Atmospheric Administration Commissioned Officer Corps, and U.S. Public Health Service Commissioned Officer Corps, commissioned officers in either senior command or senior supervisory positions (e.g., captains and flag officers in the U.S. Navy, U.S. Coast Guard (and to a lesser extent, NOAA and USPHS), and colonels and general officers in the U.S. Marine Corps) use "BZs" to congratulate or otherwise compliment colleagues, contemporaries, or juniors, the latter to include their subordinate crews or commands, for outstanding performance.

It also utilized for praising those individuals and organizations outside of their command for outstanding performance, typically routing those compliments via the superiors of those individuals and organizations.

== See also ==
- International maritime signal flags
