= Henry James Emmett =

- Born: 1 November 1782; Westminster, London, England
- Died: 28 December 1848 (aged 66); New Town, Tasmania, Australia
- Resting place: St John's, New Town, Tasmania; 42.854701°S 147.297280°E
- Occupation(s): Public administration, farmer, teacher
- Employer(s): War Office, Colonial administration of Van Diemen's Land
- Spouse: Mary Thompson nee Townsend (1779–1856)
- Children: Henry James Emmett (1809–1881), Phillip George Emmett (1810–1871), John Kenworthy Emmett (1812–1812), Thomas Spencer Emmett (1812–1813), George Grindal Emmett (1813–1850), Hamilton Cornwall Emmett (1815–1894), Edward Nucella Emmett (1817–1874), Skelton Buckley Emmett (1818–1898), Mary Elizabeth Emmett (1820–1863), Grace West Emmett (1822–1900), William Abbott Emmett (1823–1915)
- Parent(s): Henry Emmett of London and Grace West, nee Taylor
- Relatives: Father-in-law of Crawford Pasco

Henry James Emmett (1782–1848) was an English born public servant. He was in the War Office in England for seven years before emigrating to Van Diemen's Land in 1819 where he filled a number of roles in government. He and his family travelled on the Regalia a private merchant ship, arriving on 30 November 1819.

== Career ==
Before emigrating he worked at the War Office in England for seven years. On arrival, he received 1600 acres, with a larger lot at Ross and two smaller parcels of land near Hobart. From 1821 to 1824 he was clerk to the bench of magistrates and later inspector of distilleries and breweries, then chief clerk in the colonial secretary's office and editor of the Hobart Town Gazette.

Following the construction of 'Beauly Lodge' at New Town, he misappropriated fees collected by his office, a board of inquiry ordered repayment but exonerated him from deliberate dishonesty. His financial situation further deteriorated despite career advancement, in 1833 he was appointed clerk of the peace and registrar of the Court of Requests, he misappropriated further funds from wine and spirit licences and was dismissed from office.

After this he set up as a general agent, amanuensis, and debt collector and appealed unsuccessfully to the Colonial Office. In 1843 he commenced as schoolmaster at the Back River school near New Norfolk.

== Family ==
He was the eldest son of Henry Emmett of London and Grace West, née Taylor. He emigrated with his wife, Mary Thompson, née Townsend, and their six children arriving on Sullivan's Cove, Hobart, Van Diemen's Land, on 30 November 1819. He had worked under Viscount Palmerston at the War Office who provided a settler's letter of recommendation.

There were eleven children, two of whom died in England, with three born in Australia; among his children were: Henry James Emmett (1809–1881), Edward Nucella Emmett (1817–1874) and Skelton Buckley Emmett (1818–1898) (father of Evelyn Temple Emmett, [1871–1970]).

His wife survived him by eight years.
