= Andrew Knight (politician) =

Australian politician

Andrew Halley Knight (18 December 1813 – 6 July 1904) was a politician in colonial Victoria (Australia), a member of the Victorian Legislative Council.

Knight was born in Edinburgh, Scotland, and arrived in the Port Phillip District in 1838. He farmed sheep in Kalkallo, Victoria and later became a merchant in Melbourne.

Knight was a nominated member of the Victorian Legislative Council from 6 September 1853 replacing Edward Emmett. Knight remained a member until resigning on 8 March 1854; he was replaced by Charles Bradshaw.

In 1863 Knight and his wife, Elizabeth Hawkins Knight (1827 – December 1886, née Grylls), travelled from Liverpool on the SS Great Britain, arriving in Melbourne on 17 December. Elizabeth Knight had been born in Devon.

Andrew Knight died in Croydon, England on 6 July 1904.

Victorian Legislative Council
Preceded by Edward Emmett	Nominated member 6 September 1853 – 8 March 1854	Succeeded by Charles Bradshaw
