= Flag signals =

Communication using flags

Flag signals can mean any of various methods of using flags or pennants to send signals. Flags may have individual significance as signals, or two or more flags may be manipulated so that their relative positions convey symbols. Flag signals allowed communication at a distance before the invention of radio and are still used especially in connection with ships.

== Flaghoist signalling ==
Hurricane warning

Flaghoist signalling is one or more flags (or pennants) simultaneously flying from a fixed halyard, and generally any method of signaling by such means. Each of the flags has a distinct shape and color combination. Each flag or combination of flags has a preassigned meaning or "code". The International Code of Signals defines a standard set of flags and associated alphabet suitable for international use, as well as a set of standard codes. Flaghoist is also used in boat racing, to warn of impending severe weather, and other specialized applications.

Maritime flag signalling has a long history, especially prior to the advent of radio, and remains the preferred means of signaling in many situations. In naval flag signalling, additional flags and an expanded list of signals are used for identification and commands, as well as the mercantile uses. Many navies have their own proprietary or secret codes, and use additional flags. A designator flag is used to indicate if a flaghoist signal is meant to be interpreted as an ICS signal or as a naval signal. The U.S. Navy uses a set of 68 flags, including flags for each letter of the alphabet and each numeral to convey messages of tactical or administrative nature.

== Semaphore ==
Flag semaphore signalling uses two flags, held in specific positions to signify letters. This method requires simple equipment but can be obscured by bad weather. A permanently installed chain of semaphore stations is a semaphore line and before the invention of the electric telegraph, was the fastest means of communication over moderately long distances.

== Wig-wag flags ==
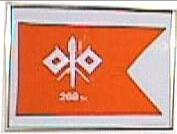
A typical US Signal Corps guidon features wig-wag flags

In the 1850s, U.S. Army Major Albert J. Myer, a surgeon by training, developed a system using left or right movements of a flag (or torch or lantern at night). Myer's system used a single flag, waved back and forth in a binary code conceptually similar to the Morse code of dots and dashes. This is sometimes called the wig-wag method of signaling, or "wig-wagging". More mobile than previous means of optical telegraphy, as it only required one flag, this code was used extensively by Signal Corps troops on both sides in the American Civil War. (Its first use in battle was by Confederate Lieutenant Edward Porter Alexander at the First Battle of Bull Run in 1861.) In this code, alphabet letters were equated with three positions of a single flag, disk, or light. The flags measured two, four, or six feet (60, 120 or 180 cm) square and were generally either red or black banners with white square centers or white banners with red square centers. The disks were 12 to 18 inches (30 to 46 cm) in diameter and were made of metal or wood frames with canvas surfaces. Somewhat easier to handle than the flags, they provided a different method for daylight communications. The lights were kerosene lanterns attached to a staff. A second "foot torch" was placed on the ground before the signalman as a fixed point of reference, making it easier for the recipient to follow the lantern's movements.

Myer's code was ternary (three symbols). However, only two of these symbols were used for letters, making it largely binary. The third symbol only appeared in control characters. Each character consisted of a combination of three basic motions (elements). The neutral position was the flagman holding his device vertically and motionless above his head. The first motion was initiated by bringing the device downward on the signalman's right side and then quickly returning it to its upright position. The second motion brought the device down on the left side and then returned it to the starting position. The third motion lowered the device in front of the signalman, then restored it to its vertical position. Like Morse code, but unlike Myer's original code, this binary code did not have a fixed length for each character. For instance, i was coded as "2", but d was coded as "222". Myer's 1866 manual also includes a 3-element fixed length code using four elements, and the 1872 manual has a 3-element fixed length code using three elements. There is little sign that these codes were widely used. The 1872 manual includes a variable length code using four elements which Myer says was used by the Army, but is superseded.

== See also ==
- England expects that every man will do his duty (a famous flag signal)
- International maritime signal flags
- Lifeguard § Flags
- Naval flag signalling
- Racing flags, for motorsport
- Racing Rules of Sailing
- Signaller
- Substitute flag

== General and cited references ==
- Alexander, Edward (April 1907). Military Memoirs of a Confederate. New York: Charles Scribner's Sons.
- Chambers, John Whiteclay II (1999). The Oxford Companion to American Military History. Oxford: Oxford University Press. ISBN 0195071980.
- Myer, Albert J. (1851). A New Sign Language for Deaf Mutes. Buffalo: Steam Press of Jewett, Thomas & Co.
- Myer, Albert J. (1866). A Manual of Signals. New York: D. Van Nostrand. hdl:2027/nyp.33433009343363.
- Myer, Albert J. (1872). A Manual of Signals. New York: D. Van Nostrand.
- Raines, Rebecca (1996). Getting the Message Through (PDF). Washington D.C.: U.S. Government Printing Office. ISBN 0160872812. Archived from the original (PDF) on August 16, 2012.
- Wolters, Timothy S. (2013). Information at Sea. Johns Hopkins University Press. ISBN 978-1421410265.
- International Code of Signals for Visual, Sound, and Radio Communications, United States Edition, 1969 (Revised 2003) (PDF). 1969.
- International Code of Signals, 2005 ed. (IMO IA994E). IMO – International Maritime Organization. 2005. ISBN 978-92-801-4198-6.
