= England expects that every man will do his duty =

Inspirational phrase sent before the Battle of Trafalgar

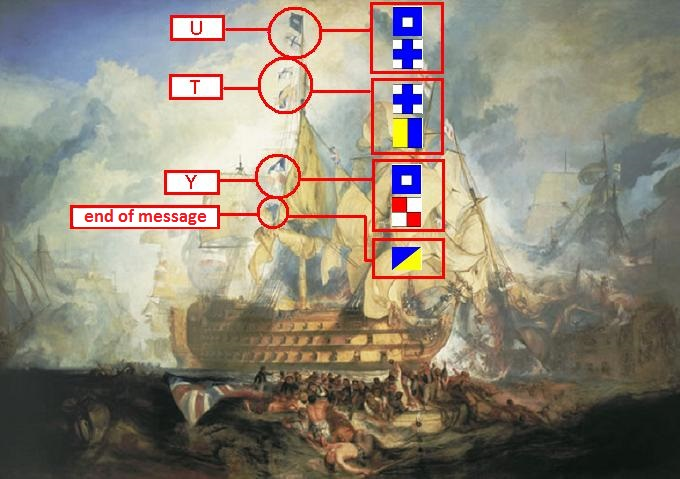
The Battle of Trafalgar by J. M. W. Turner shows the last three letters of the signal flying from the Victory.

"England expects that every man will do his duty" was a signal sent by Vice-Admiral of the White Horatio Nelson, 1st Viscount Nelson, from his flagship HMS Victory as the Battle of Trafalgar was about to commence on 21 October 1805.

During the battle, as Nelson's fleet closed in on the allied fleet, he ordered Lieutenant John Pasco to signal the British fleet as soon as possible. After Pasco suggested some changes, and Nelson agreeing to them, the signal was sent at around 11:45 a.m. on 21 October 1805 and relayed using a numeric flag code known as the Telegraphic signals; or Marine vocabulary.

Although there was much confusion surrounding the precise wording of the signal in the aftermath of the battle, the significance of the victory and Nelson's death during the battle led to the phrase becoming a standard representation of a militant English spirit of courage and virtue in the face of conflict. It has been regularly quoted, paraphrased and referenced up to the modern day.

== Background ==
During the Napoleonic Wars, Napoleon planned to invade Great Britain. To do so, he ordered both the French and Spanish navies to take control of the English Channel to ensure a safe passage for the Grande Armée. Commanded by Admiral Pierre-Charles Villeneuve, the allied navy went down to Cape Trafalgar, where they encountered a British Fleet commanded by Horatio Nelson.

On 21 October 1805, the Battle of Trafalgar began, with Nelson's fleet of 27 ships pitted against the combined Spanish and French fleet of 33. To secure victory, Nelson sailed his fleet toward the flank of the Allied fleet to break it into pieces. The naval battle resulted in 18 Allied ships being lost, while the British lost none. The French lost 14,000 troops, with at least 7,000 prisoners of war, including French Admiral Pierre-Charles Villeneuve. There were 1,500 British casualties, including Admiral Horatio Nelson, who was killed. As a result, the British were victorious, ensuring their control of the sea and ending the possibility of a French invasion of Britain.

== Signals during the battle ==
As the British fleet closed with the opposing combined fleets of France and Spain, Nelson signalled all the necessary battle instructions to his ships. Aware of the momentousness of events to come, Nelson felt that something extra was required. He instructed his signal officer, Lieutenant John Pasco, to signal to the fleet, as quickly as possible, the message "England confides [i.e. is confident] that every man will do his duty." Pasco suggested to Nelson that expects be substituted for confides, since the former word was in the signal book, whereas confides would have to be spelt out letter-by-letter. Nelson agreed to the change (even though it produced a less trusting impression):

His Lordship came to me on the poop, and after ordering certain signals to be made, about a quarter to noon, he said, 'Mr. Pasco, I wish to say to the fleet, ENGLAND CONFIDES THAT EVERY MAN WILL DO HIS DUTY' and he added 'You must be quick, for I have one more to make which is for close action.' I replied, 'If your Lordship will permit me to substitute the confides for expects the signal will soon be completed, because the word expects is in the vocabulary, and confides must be spelt,' His Lordship replied, in haste, and with seeming satisfaction, 'That will do, Pasco, make it directly.'

— John Pasco

Thus, at around 11:45 a.m. on 21 October 1805, the signal was sent. The exact time the signal was sent is not known (one account puts it as early as 10:30), as the message was repeated throughout the fleet, but Pasco puts it at "about a quarter to noon" and logs from other ships of the line also put it close to this time.

Nelson's signal, relayed using Popham's "Telegraphic Signals of Marine Vocabulary"

The signal was relayed using the numeric flag code known as the "Telegraphic Signals of Marine Vocabulary", devised in 1800 by Rear Admiral Sir Home Popham, and based on the signal books created earlier by Admiral Lord Howe. This code assigned the digits 0 to 9 to ten signal flags, which were used in combination. Code numbers 1–25 represented letters of the alphabet (omitting J and with V=20 before U=21); higher numbers were assigned meanings by a code book.

The code numbers are believed to have been hoisted on the mizzenmast, one after another, with the "telegraphic flag" (a red-over-white diagonally-split flag) also being flown to show that the signals employed Popham's code. As well as digit flags, the code used "repeat" flags so that only one set of digits was needed; thus the word do, coded as "220", used a "2" flag, a "first repeat" flag here serving as a second 2, and a "0" flag. The word duty was not in the codebook (and was not replaced as confides had been), so had to be spelt out, and the whole message required twelve "lifts". It is believed that it would have taken about four minutes, with the end of the message indicated by an "end of code" flag (blue over yellow diagonally split). A team of four to six men, led by Lt. Pasco, would have prepared and hoisted the flags onboard Nelson's flagship HMS Victory. The message shows one of the shortcomings of Popham's code—even the two-letter "do" required three flags hoisted for the signal. It is reported that a great cheer went up as the signal was hoisted and repeated throughout the fleet.

According to the historian John Knox Laughton:

It is said that, as he saw the flags going up, Collingwood remarked half-peevishly to his flag-lieutenant, "I wish Nelson would make no more signals; we all understand what we have to do." When, however, the signal was reported, he was delighted, and ordered it to be announced to the ship's company, by whom it was received with the greatest enthusiasm.

The message "engage the enemy more closely" was Nelson's final signal to the fleet, sent at 12:15 p.m., before a single British cannon had been fired at the enemy. This message was signalled using the telegraphic flag and flags 1 and 6. Nelson ordered this signal hauled up and kept aloft. It remained up until shot away during the battle.

== After the battle ==
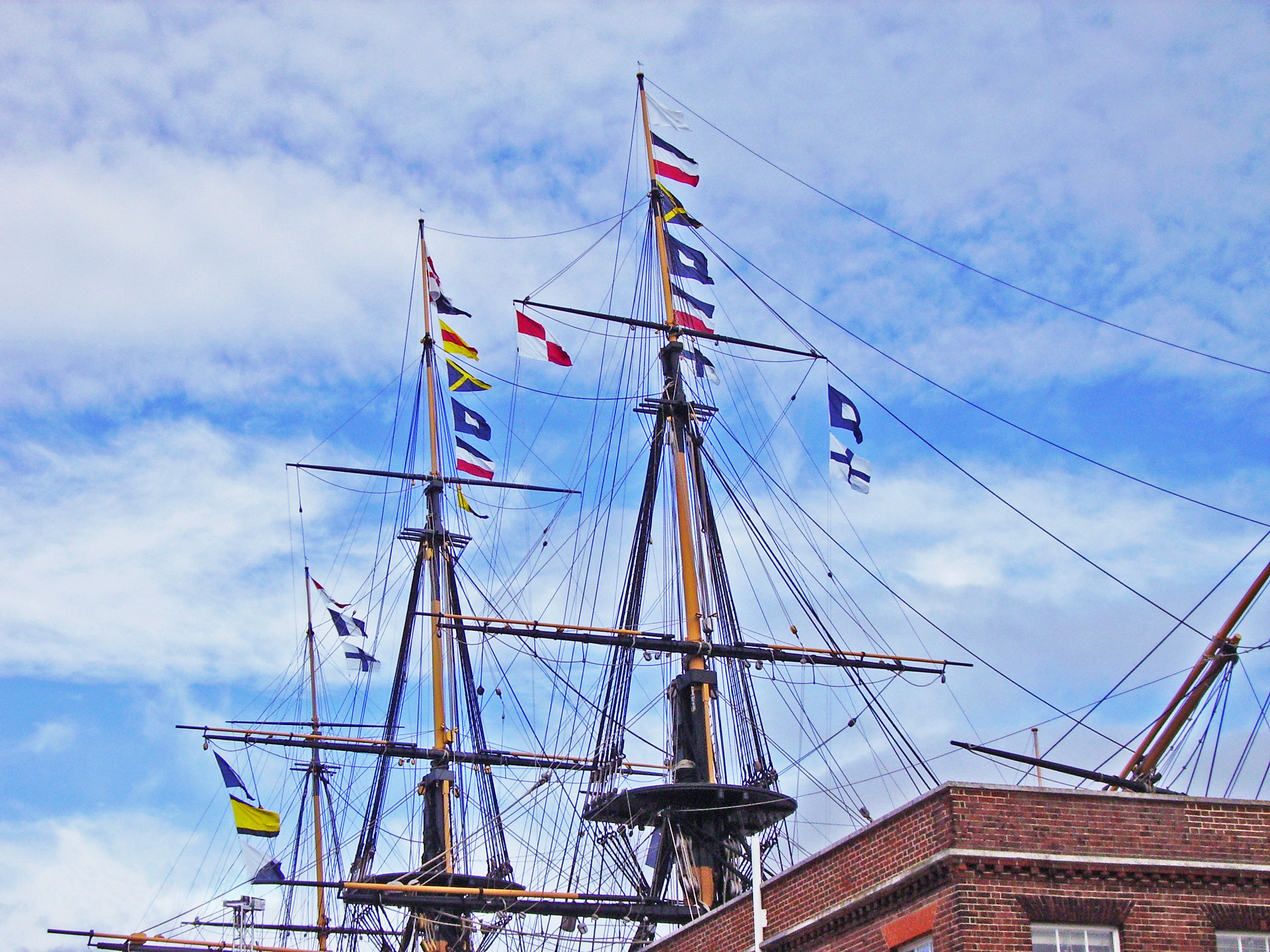
Nelson's signal, "England expects that every man will do his duty", flying from Victory on the bicentenary of the Battle of Trafalgar in 2005

Almost immediately, the signal began to be misquoted. A number of ships in the fleet recorded the signal as "England expects every man to do his duty" (omitting that and replacing will with to). This version became so prevalent that it is recorded on Nelson's tomb in St Paul's Cathedral. The word that is also omitted on the version around the base of Nelson's Column. However, the Victory's log and the accounts of signal officer John Pasco and Henry Blackwood (captain of the frigate Euryalus), both present at the preparation of the signal, agree on the form given here. On 26 December 1805, The Times newspaper in London reported the signal as; "England expects every officer and man to do his duty this day". In 1811, the tenor John Braham composed a song, "The Death of Nelson", including the words of the signal. The song became popular almost immediately and was performed throughout the British Empire during the 19th century. To make the words fit the metre, they were altered to "England expects that every man this day will do his duty". This version of the wording is also persistent.

Between 1885 and 1908 it was believed that the signal had been sent using the 1799 code book, as in 1885 it was pointed out that this had not been replaced until 1808. In 1908 it was discovered that the Admiralty had, in fact, changed the signal code in November 1803, after the 1799 version had been captured by the French, and new code books had been issued to Nelson's fleet at Cadiz in September 1805. As a result, books published between these two dates show the signal using the wrong flags.

The signal is still hoisted on the Victory at her dry dock in Portsmouth on Trafalgar Day (21 October) every year, although the signal flags are displayed all at once, running from fore to aft, rather than hoisted sequentially from the mizzenmast.

=== Similar signals ===
The signal has been imitated in other navies of the world. Napoleon ordered the French equivalent, "La France compte que chacun fera son devoir", to be displayed on French vessels. At the opening of the Battle of Plattsburgh in September 1814, Commodore Thomas MacDonough of the United States Navy flew the signal "Impressed seamen call on every man to do his duty", referring to the fact that impressment of sailors had been a U.S. casus belli of the War of 1812. During the 1865 Battle of Riachuelo, a turning point of the Paraguayan War, Brazilian Admiral Manuel Barroso, Baron of Amazonas, rallied his fleet by signalling the Portuguese equivalent, "O Brasil espera que cada um cumpra o seu dever".

A similar signal was used by the Imperial Japanese Navy during the Russo-Japanese War. At the Battle of Tsushima on 27 May 1905, Admiral Tōgō Heihachirō – who had studied naval tactics in Britain from 1871 to 1878, and was known as the "Nelson of the East"– signalled to his fleet: "The fate of the Empire depends upon today's battle: let every man do his utmost".

== Connection with Mission Command ==
The implied reliance on shared intent, individual duty, and initiative has made "England Expects" an early symbol of what would evolve into Mission Command, a decentralized style of Command and Control applied with considerable success since the nineteenth century. Nelson trusted the experience, skill, and initiative of his individual captains and sailors, as a way of managing the uncertainty inherent in war.

== Later uses ==
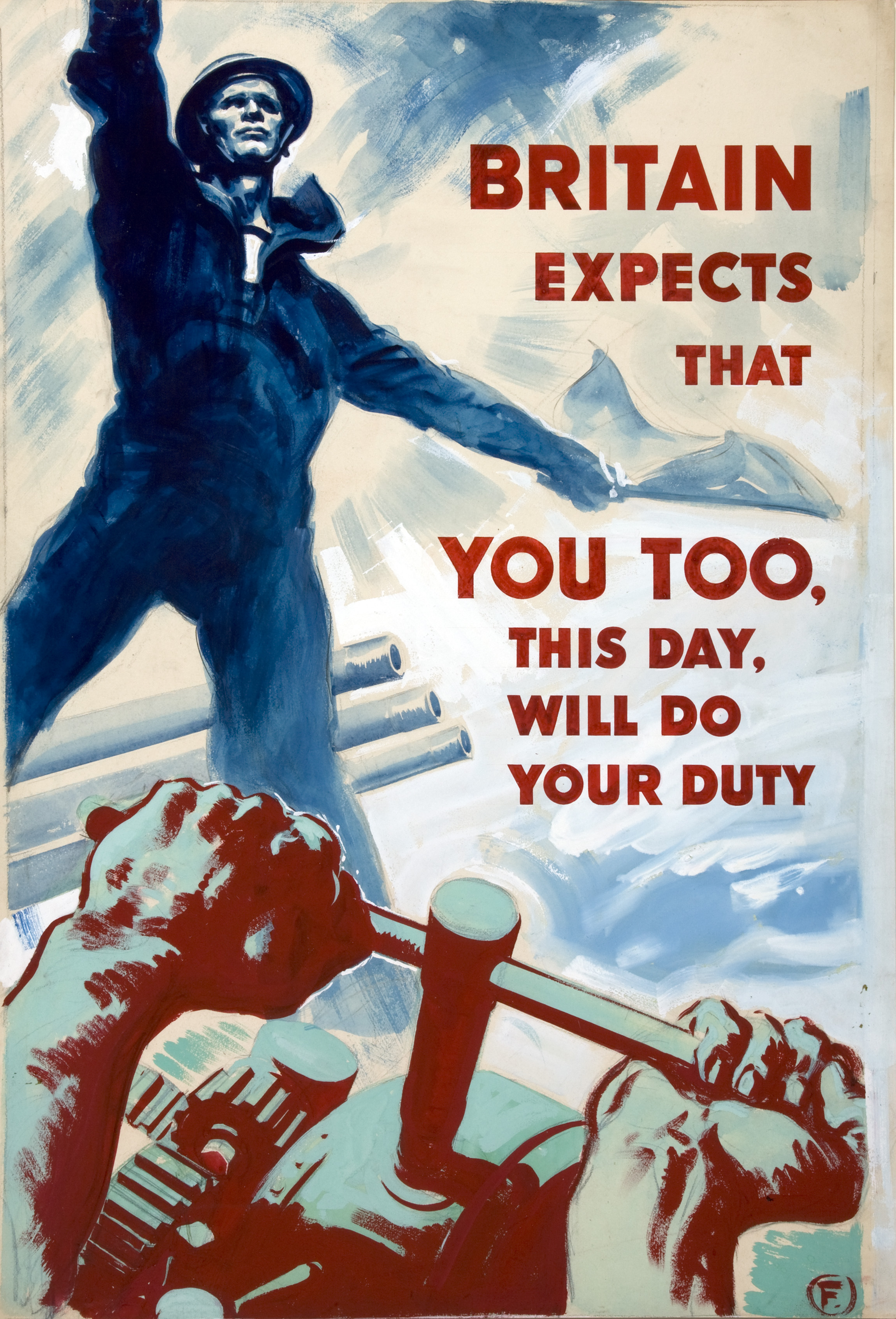
A World War II poster intended to increase industrial production on the home front

Charles Dickens quotes it in Chapter 43 of Martin Chuzzlewit:

... as the poet informs us, England expects Every man to do his duty, England is the most sanguine country on the face of the earth, and will find itself continually disappointed.

In Lewis Carroll's The Hunting of the Snark, the Bellman says:

For England Expects – I forbear to proceed. Tis a maxim tremendous, but trite.

The phrase was adapted by James Joyce in his novel Ulysses, as "Ireland expects that every man this day will do his duty".

In Ogden Nash's collection of poems I'm a Stranger Here Myself (1938) there is a short poem "England Expects".

During the Second World War, an Admiralty propaganda poster intended to increase industrial production on the home front, carried the slogan; "Britain expects that you too, this day, will do your duty". Nelson's flag signal was hoisted by the Royal Navy monitor HMS Erebus at the start of the bombardment for the Normandy landings on 6 June 1944.

The phrase was referenced by Margaret Thatcher during her crucial speech to the cabinet which finally persuaded them to rally behind her over the divisive issue of the poll tax.

Today "England expects..." is often adapted for use in the media, especially in relation to the expectations for the victory of English sporting teams. Such is the sentence's connotation with sport that a book on the history of the England national football team by James Corbett was entitled England Expects. A BBC Scotland television drama was also titled England Expects.

== See also ==
- Z flag in Japan
- "A Drop of Nelson's Blood", another tradition originating in the same battle
