= International inspection pennant =

International flag used by fisheries inspection vessels

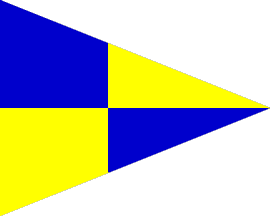
International inspection pennant

The international inspection pennant is an international flag for fisheries inspection vessels currently used by the fisheries inspection branches of the European Union, France, New Zealand and Norway. It is also used by various FIRMS member organisations such as the NEAFC, NAFO and ICSEAF.

== History ==
The international inspection pennant was ratified by the North Sea Fisheries Convention of 1882.

== See also ==
- International maritime signal flags
- Yellow flag (contagion)
