= Channel hopping =

Channel hopping can refer to:

- Channel surfing, switching between television channels
- Frequency-hopping spread spectrum, in telecommunications, sending radio signals using different carrier frequencies
- Booze cruise, a brief trip across the English Channel from Britain in order to buy cigarettes or alcohol
