= Dressing overall =

Decorating a ship with (signal) flags

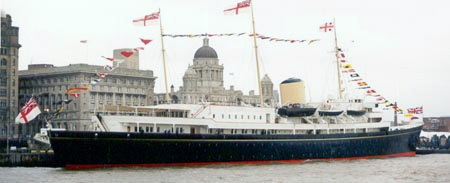
HMY Britannia (with rear admiral aboard) dressed overall on the River Mersey, Liverpool

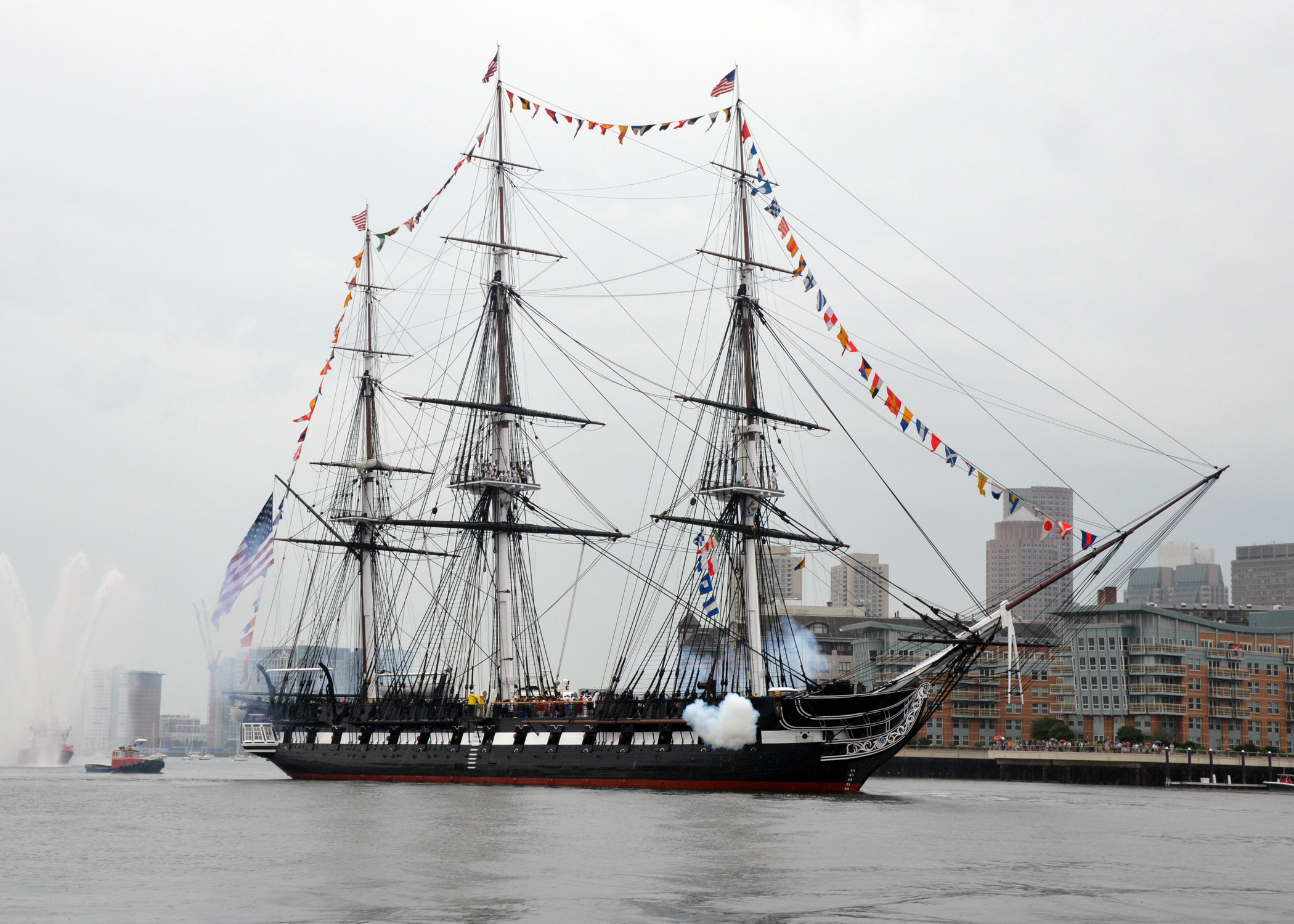
USS Constitution, dressed overall, fires a seventeen-gun salute in Boston Harbor, 4 July 2014.

Dressing overall consists of stringing international maritime signal flags on a ship from stemhead to masthead, from masthead to masthead (if the vessel has more than one mast) and then down to the taffrail. It is a sign of celebration, and is done for celebratory occasions, anniversaries and events, whether national, local or personal.

The order in which the signal flags are placed on the "dressing lines" varies from country to country: in some places a specific order is laid down, in others there is no such provision; either way, the intention is to produce a random succession of flags (i.e. not conveying any words or other messages), with the numerical and other pennants spaced equally and regularly along the line. Custom and regulations require that national or other flags not be mixed in with the signal flags when dressing a ship overall.

When a ship is properly dressed overall in harbor, ensigns (in addition to the one flown in the usual position at the stern) should fly at each masthead, unless displaced by another flag, e.g., that of a flag officer. A ship underway does not array herself with signal flags, but the masthead ensign(s) would still signify that she is dressed while underway.
