= Pratique =

License given to ship at port to avoid quarantine

Q flag

Pratique (/ˈprætɪk/) is the license given to a ship to enter a port, that indicates to local authorities (on assurance from the captain) that it is free from contagious disease. The clearance granted is commonly referred to as free pratique. A ship can signal a request for pratique by flying a solid yellow square-shaped flag. This yellow flag is the Q flag in the set of international maritime signal flags.

In the event that free pratique is not granted, a vessel will be held in quarantine, according to the customs and health regulations prevailing at the port of entry, typically until a customs or biosecurity officer makes a satisfactory inspection.

Since flying the Q flag involves a request for boarding by Port State Control, it has also become an invitation to Customs to inspect a vessel for dutiable goods or contraband, as in the Rich Harvest case, where a yacht carrying a large quantity of alcohol flew the Q flag in order to seek exemption from having to pay duty during a temporary visit to port. The same vessel was also flying the Q flag when the yacht was boarded in Cape Verde and found to be carrying more than one ton of cocaine. However, although the captain had thereby invited the authorities to make an inspection (being, according to his claim, ignorant of the fact that the boat was carrying contraband), he and the crew were nevertheless arrested for trafficking.

A question over who granted pratique arose with the COVID-19 incident involving the Ruby Princess cruise ship.

== See also ==
- Quarantine
