= North Sea Fisheries Convention =

1882 international treaty

International Convention for regulating the police of the North Sea fisheries outside territorial waters
- Signed: May 6, 1882
- Location: The Hague
- Effective: May 15, 1884
- Condition: Exchange of ratifications
- Expiration: September 26, 1976
- Parties: Belgium; Denmark; France; Germany; Netherlands; United Kingdom
- Depositary: Netherlands government

The North Sea Fisheries Convention, officially known as the International Convention for regulating the police of the North Sea fisheries outside territorial waters, was a treaty that was signed on May 6, 1882. The inaugural conference was intended to provide a set of regulations for North Sea fisheries. The High Contracting Parties, which included Great Britain, Germany, Denmark, Netherlands, Belgium and France, entered the convention for a period of five years.

The convention, which operated only outside the three-mile limit from land, was defined as follows:

- The fishermen of each country shall enjoy the exclusive right of fishery within the distance of 3 (nautical) miles (5.56 km) from low-water mark along the whole extent of the coasts of their respective countries, as well as of the dependent islands and banks.
- As regards bays, the distance of 3 miles (5.56 km) shall be measured from a straight line drawn across the bay, in the part nearest the entrance, at the first point, where the width does not exceed 10 miles (18.5 km).
- The present article shall not in any way prejudice the freedom of navigation and anchorage in territorial waters accorded to fishing boats, provided they conform to the special police regulations enacted by the powers to whom the shore belongs.

A supplementary convention was signed at The Hague on November 16, 1887, among the same High Contracting Parties, relating to liquor traffic in the North Sea. It applies to the area set out in article 4 of the Convention of IV, May 6, 1882, and forbids the sale of spirituous liquors within it to persons on board fishing vessels. A reciprocal right of visit and search is granted under this convention to the cruisers entrusted with carrying out of its provisions.

== See also ==
- Fisheries Convention
- International inspection pennant
