= Gas turbine engine thrust =

Physical description of a gas turbine type jet engine thrust

The familiar study of jet aircraft treats jet thrust with a "black box" description which only looks at what goes into the jet engine, air and fuel, and what comes out, exhaust gas and an unbalanced force. This force, called thrust, is the sum of the momentum difference between entry and exit and any unbalanced pressure force between entry and exit, as explained in "Thrust calculation".

As an example, an early turbojet, the Bristol Olympus Mk. 101, had a momentum thrust of 9300 lb. and a pressure thrust of 1800 lb. giving a total of 11,100 lb. Looking inside the "black box" shows that the thrust results from all the unbalanced momentum and pressure forces created within the engine itself. These forces, some forwards and some rearwards, are across all the internal parts, both stationary and rotating, such as ducts, compressors, etc., which are in the primary gas flow which flows through the engine from front to rear. The algebraic sum of all these forces is delivered to the airframe for propulsion. "Flight" gives examples of these internal forces for two early jet engines, the Rolls-Royce Avon Ra.14 and the de Havilland Goblin.

== Transferring thrust to the aircraft ==
The engine thrust acts along the engine centreline. The aircraft "holds" the engine on the outer casing of the engine at some distance from the engine centreline (at the engine mounts). This arrangement causes the engine casing to bend (known as backbone bending) and the round rotor casings to distort (ovalization). Distortion of the engine structure has to be controlled with suitable mount locations to maintain acceptable rotor and seal clearances and prevent rubbing. A well-publicized example of excessive structural deformation occurred with the original Pratt & Whitney JT9D engine installation in the Boeing 747 aircraft. The engine mounting arrangement had to be revised with the addition of an extra thrust frame to reduce the casing deflections to an acceptable amount.

== Rotor thrust ==
The rotor thrust on a thrust bearing is not related to the engine thrust. It may even change direction at some RPM. The bearing load is determined by bearing life considerations. Although the aerodynamic loads on the compressor and turbine blades contribute to the rotor thrust they are small compared to cavity loads inside the rotor which result from the secondary air system pressures and sealing diameters on discs, etc. To keep the load within the bearing specification seal diameters are chosen accordingly as, many years ago, on the backface of the impeller in the de Havilland Ghost engine. Sometimes an extra disc known as a balance piston has to be added inside the rotor. An early turbojet example with a balance piston was the Rolls-Royce Avon.

== Thrust calculation ==
The net thrust (F_{N}) of an engine is given by:

$$F_N =( \dot{m}_{air} + \dot{m}_{fuel}) v_e - \dot{m}_{air} v$$

where:
ṁ_{air}	= the mass rate of air flow through the engine
ṁ_{fuel}	= the mass rate of propellant flow entering the engine
v_{e}	= the effective exhaust velocity of the jet (the speed of the exhaust plume relative to the aircraft)
v	= the velocity of the air intake = the true airspeed of the aircraft
(ṁ_{air} + ṁ_{fuel})v_{e}	= the nozzle gross thrust (F_{G})
ṁ_{air} v	= the ram drag of the intake air

Most types of jet engine have an air intake, which provides the bulk of the fluid exiting the exhaust. Conventional rocket engines, however, do not have an intake, so ṁ_{air} is zero. Therefore, rocket engines do not have ram drag and the gross thrust of the rocket engine nozzle is the net thrust of the engine. Consequently, the thrust characteristics of a rocket motor are different from that of an air breathing jet engine, and thrust is independent of velocity.

If the velocity of the jet from a jet engine is equal to sonic velocity, the jet engine's nozzle is said to be choked. If the nozzle is choked, the pressure at the nozzle exit plane is greater than atmospheric pressure, and extra terms must be added to the above equation to account for the pressure thrust. However, v_{e} is the effective exhaust velocity. If a turbojet engine has a purely convergent exhaust nozzle and the actual exhaust velocity reaches the speed of sound in air at the exhaust temperature and pressure, the exhaust gas cannot be further accelerated by the nozzle. In such a case, the exhaust gas retains a pressure which is higher than that of the ambient air. This is the source of 'pressure thrust'.

The rate of flow of fuel entering the engine is often very small compared with the rate of flow of air. When the contribution of fuel to the nozzle gross thrust can be ignored, the net thrust is:

$$F_N = \dot{m}_{air} (v_e - v)$$

The velocity of the jet (v_{e}) must exceed the true airspeed of the aircraft (v) if there is to be a net forward thrust on the aircraft. The velocity (v_{e}) can be calculated thermodynamically based on adiabatic expansion.

== Thrust augmentation ==
Thrust augmentation has taken many forms, most commonly to supplement inadequate take-off thrust. Some early jet aircraft needed rocket assistance to take off from high altitude airfields or when the day temperature was high. A more recent aircraft, the Tupolev Tu-22 supersonic bomber, was fitted with four SPRD-63 boosters for take-off. Possibly the most extreme requirement needing rocket assistance, and which was short-lived, was zero-length launching. Almost as extreme, but very common, is catapult assistance from aircraft carriers. Rocket assistance has also been used during flight. The SEPR 841 booster engine was used on the Dassault Mirage for high altitude interception.

Early aft-fan arrangements which added bypass airflow to a turbojet were known as thrust augmentors. The aft-fan fitted to the General Electric CJ805-3 turbojet augmented the take-off thrust from 11,650lb to 16,100lb.

Water, or other coolant, injection into the compressor or combustion chamber and fuel injection into the jetpipe (afterburning/reheat) became standard ways to increase thrust, known as 'wet' thrust to differentiate with the no-augmentation 'dry' thrust.

Coolant injection (pre-compressor cooling) has been used, together with afterburning, to increase thrust at supersonic speeds. The 'Skyburner' McDonnell Douglas F-4 Phantom II set a world speed record using water injection in front of the engine.

At high Mach numbers afterburners supply progressively more of the engine thrust as the thrust from the turbomachine drops off towards zero at which speed the engine pressure ratio (epr) has fallen to 1.0 and all the engine thrust comes from the afterburner. The afterburner also has to make up for the pressure loss across the turbomachine which is a drag item at higher speeds where the epr will be less than 1.0.

Thrust augmentation of existing afterburning engine installations for special short-duration tasks has been the subject of studies for launching small payloads into low earth orbits using aircraft such as McDonnell Douglas F-4 Phantom II, McDonnell Douglas F-15 Eagle, Dassault Rafale and Mikoyan MiG-31, and also for carrying experimental packages to high altitudes using a Lockheed SR-71. In the first case an increase in the existing maximum speed capability is required for orbital launches. In the second case an increase in thrust within the existing speed capability is required. Compressor inlet cooling is used in the first case. A compressor map shows that the airflow reduces with increasing compressor inlet temperature although the compressor is still running at maximum RPM (but reduced aerodynamic speed). Compressor inlet cooling increases the aerodynamic speed and flow and thrust. In the second case a small increase in the maximum mechanical speed and turbine temperature were allowed, together with nitrous oxide injection into the afterburner and simultaneous increase in afterburner fuel flow.
