= SEPR 84 =

Type of liquid-propellant rocket engine

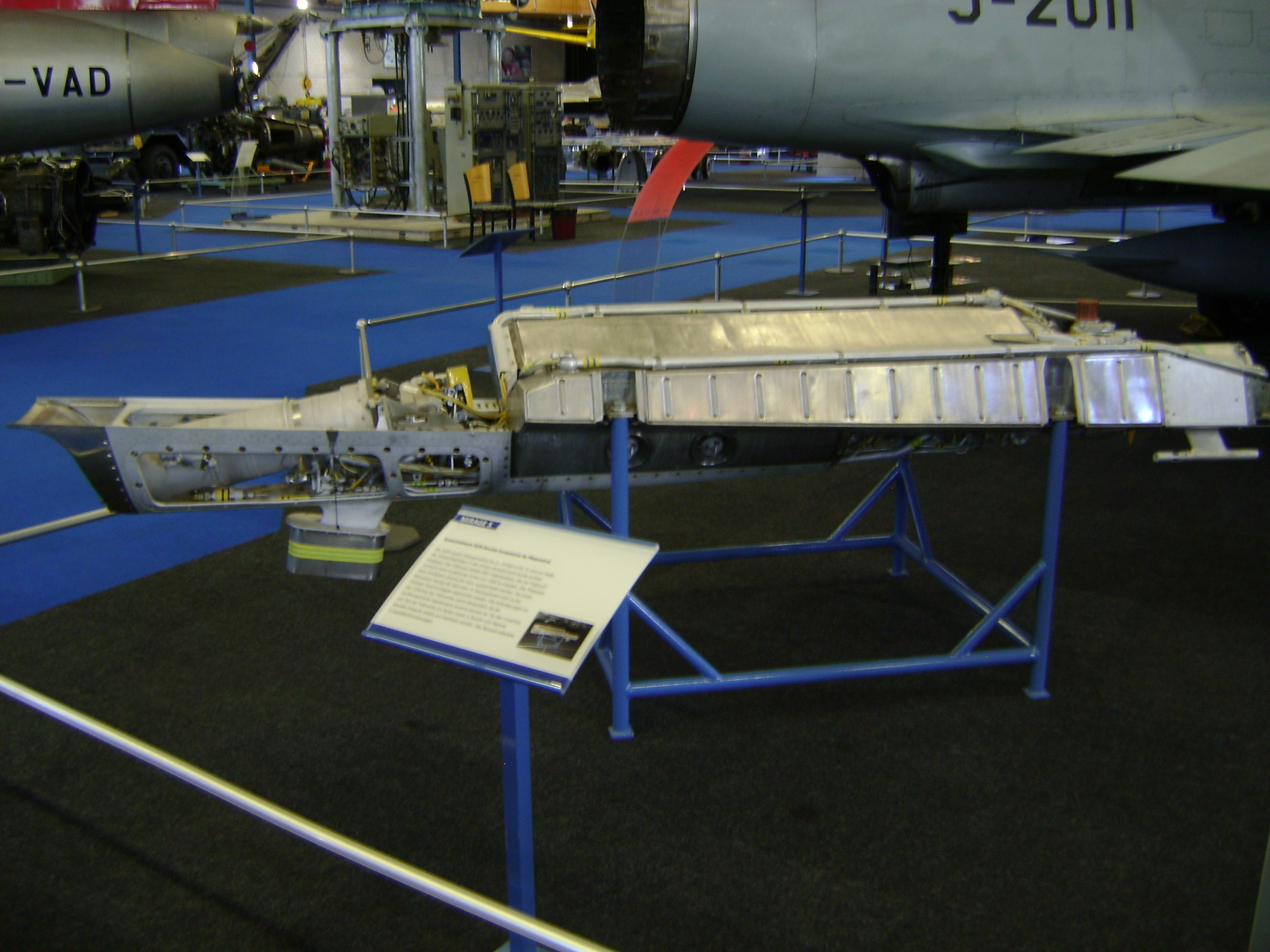
- A SEPR 841 rocket pack at the Flieger-Flab-Museum
- Type: Liquid-fuelled rocket engine
- National origin: France
- Manufacturer: Société d'Etudes pour la Propulsion par Réaction (SEPR)

The SEPR 84 is a family of liquid-propellant rocket engines used as boosters for the Dassault Mirage III mixed-power high-altitude interceptor aircraft of the 1960s. The engine was one of several similar developed by SEPR (Société d'Etudes pour la Propulsion par Réaction).

== SEPR 841 ==
SEPR's auxiliary rocket engines were based on the hypergolic fuel chemistry of nitric acid oxidiser and TX2 (tri-ethylamine xylidine) fuel.

Unusually, the turbopump for the engine was mechanically driven from outside. A mechanical drive shaft from the accessory drive of the main turbojet provided the 93 brake horsepower (69 kW) needed at 5,070 rpm, provided that the engine was running at full speed. As the propellants are hypergolic, the engine can be ignited repeatedly simply by engaging the clutch drive to the pump.

Bulk production of the engines was carried out by Hispano-Suiza.

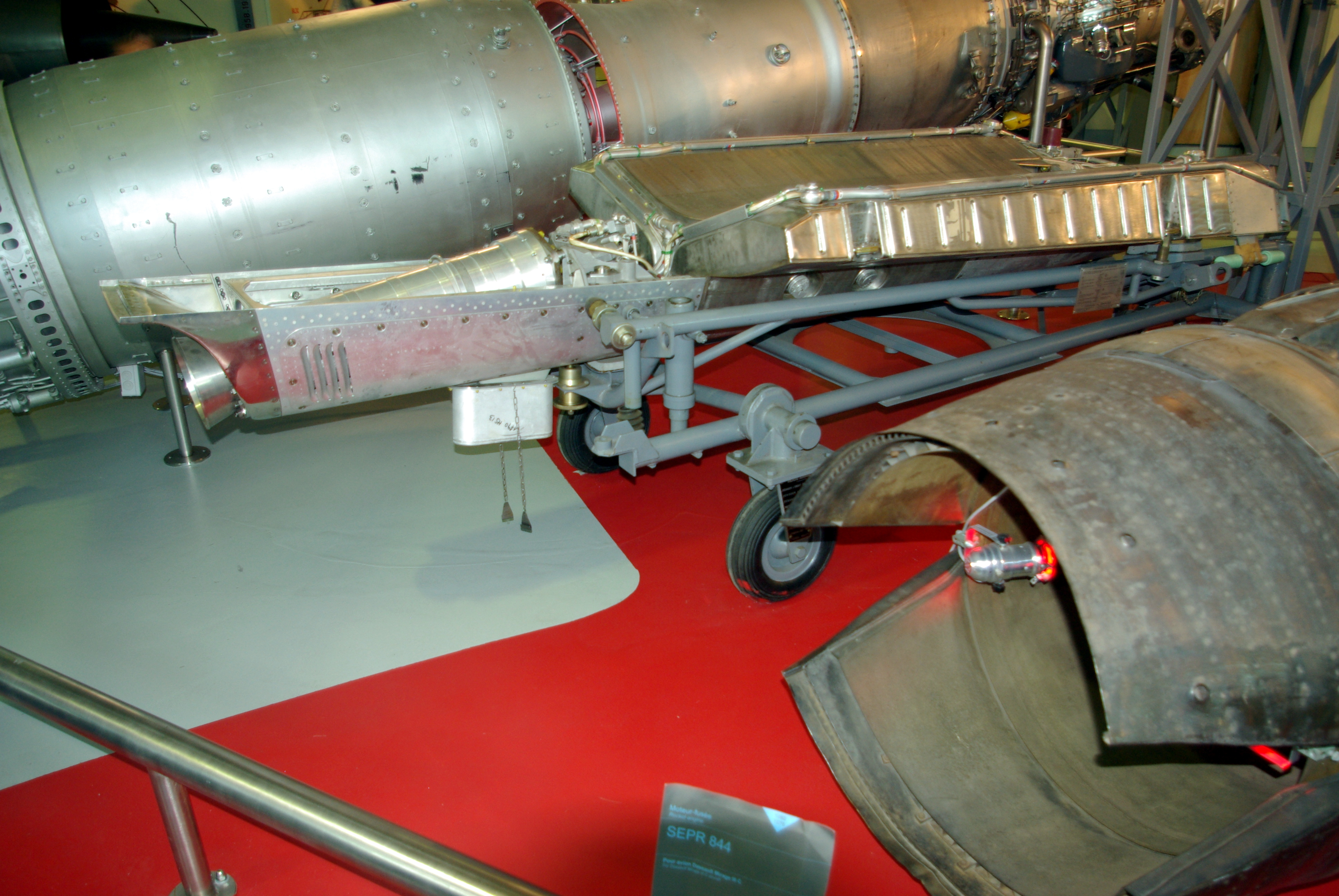
A SEPR 844 at the Musée Safran

== SEPR 844 ==
For simplicity of fuel supply, the TX2 fuel of the SEPR 841 was replaced with standard Jet TR-0 / JP-4 / JP-5 (kerosene) in the SEPR 844.

== Mirage ==
The Mirage and its distinctive delta wing planform began with the prototype MD 550 Mystère-Delta. This bore little relation, other than its name, to the Dassault Mystère; France's swept-wing fighter of the period. The delta aircraft was smaller, around two thirds of the Mystère's weight and was powered by two small Viper turbojets and a SEPR 66 liquid-fuelled rocket. All three of these engines barely exceeded the thrust of the Mystère's ATAR 101D, although they also only weighed about half of the ATAR.

=== Mirage IIIC ===
The Mirage III adopted the more developed and afterburning ATAR 9. (Note: At 12,000 lbf (53 kN) thrust, this was around twice that of the Mystère's ATAR 101D) As the delta wing considerably increased the supersonic capacity of the aircraft, rocket power was retained. This was the first European aircraft to exceed Mach 2 in level flight. (Note: In May 1958, the British Lightning would not achieve this until November)

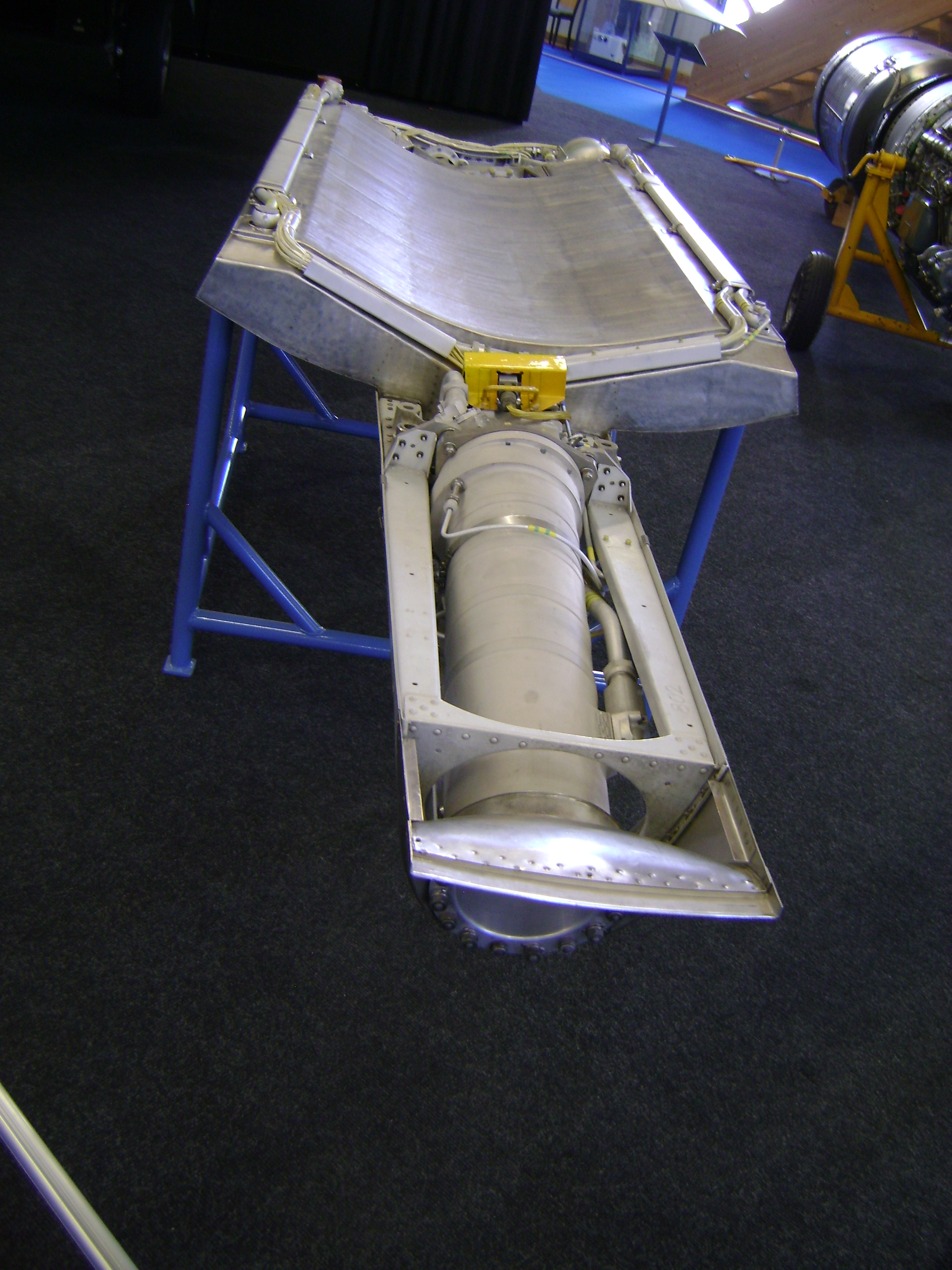

It was recognised that most mission profiles did not require the rocket and could not afford its fuel consumption. The original goal of intercepting high-flying bombers also seemed to be receding in favour of missiles, for both offence and defence. The Mirage's rocket was thus mounted as a removable pod which could be replaced with a 90 imperial gallons (410 L) jet fuel tank for additional range. Only the high altitude interception would still use it.

To retain balance as rocket fuel was consumed, the rocket pack was in two parts. The 310 litres (69 imp gal) nitric acid oxidiser tank was mounted directly ahead of the rocket engine. A smaller 150 litres (32 imp gal) TX2 fuel tank was mounted just behind the cockpit, replacing the cannon pack. When in the rocket-powered interceptor role, the aircraft would only be armed with missiles.

The fuel tank and rocket pack could be swapped in around 20 minutes by removing six bolts. Fuelling the rocket oxidiser was potentially somewhat hazardous and so it was carried out away from other aircraft, by groundcrew in protective clothing and with a fire crew standing by in order to flush away any spillage. Acid refuelling was carried out above a steel drip tray, with the acid flow and tank vent return through closed pipework with a sightglass to observe full tanks.

Performance in training sorties achieved Mach 1.4 without the rocket and 1.8 with. Altitudes of 65,000 feet (20,000 m) could be reached in a zoom climb, or 75,000 feet (23,000 m) on rocket thrust. A typical training sortie duration of 45 minutes would be reduced to under 30, with high Mach and rocket use.

== Specifications (SEPR 841) ==
Data from Aircraft engines of the World 1964/65.

=== General characteristics ===
- Type: liquid-fuelled rocket engine
- Length: 3,270 mm (128.7 in)
  - Width: 1,100 mm (43.3 in)
  - Height: 650 mm (25.6 in)
- Diameter:
- Dry weight: 205 kg (452 lb) including chassis and propellant tanks
- Fuel: TX2 (50% tri-ethylamine-50% xylidine a.k.a. Tonka)
- Oxidiser: nitric acid
  - Propellant consumption: 0.00197 kg/s (0.00435 lb/s) at a fuel-oxidiser ratio 1:3.5 by weight

=== Components ===
- Pumps: centrifugal pumps driven by PTO from main engine

=== Performance ===
- Thrust:
  - 15 kN (3,375 lbf) full throttle at sea level
  - 16 kN (3,700 lbf) full throttle at 16,000 m (52,500 ft)
  - 1 kN (165 lbf) half throttle at sea level
- Burn time:

== See also ==
- Saunders-Roe SR.53
