= Fisheries Convention =

International agreement on fishing rights in Western Europe

Convention on conduct of fishing operations in the North Atlantic
- Parties (coastline involved) Parties (coastline not involved) Signatory (landlocked, no coastline) Former party
- Signed: 9 March 1964; 62 years ago
- Location: London, United Kingdom
- Effective: 15 March 1966; 60 years ago
- Condition: 8 ratifications
- Signatories: 12
- Parties: 12
- Depositary: Government of the United Kingdom of Great Britain and Northern Ireland
- Languages: English and French

The Fisheries Convention or the London Fisheries Convention is an international agreement signed in London in relation to fishing rights across the coastal waters of Western Europe, in particular the fishing rights in the North Sea, in the Skagerrak, in the Kattegat and on the European Atlantic coast. It gives right of full access to the fishing grounds between 6 and 12 nautical miles of the national coastline to the fishing industry of those contracting parties that had already been fishing there in the period 1953–1962.

This agreement is largely superseded to the Common Fisheries Policy (the CFP), as all parties are members of the European Union.

== Background and negotiations ==
Between Belgium, Denmark, France, Germany, Netherlands, United Kingdom the "International Convention for regulating the police of the North Sea fisheries outside territorial waters" (the North Sea Fisheries Convention) of 1888 applied which allowed fishing in each other's waters up to 3 miles from the coast line. The United Kingdom denounced this convention in 1963 in order to allow setting up an exclusive fishery zone. After denunciation it invited the parties to that convention and several others to negotiate on several issues related to fisheries, which resulted in the Fisheries Convention.

Negotiations took place between the parties of the European Economic Communities, the European Free Trade Association, the Commission of the EEC, as well as Iceland, Ireland and Norway.

== Parties ==
The convention has 12 parties, while 1 signatory (Luxembourg) signed but did not ratify.

Poland is a non-signatory which acceded to the convention after its entry into force.

Party	Ratification/ Accession	Entry into force	Partly superseded by EU policy	Denunciation/ Withdrawal	Territorial scope
Belgium	10 February 1966	15 March 1966	21 September 1970; 25 January 1983		all coasts
Kingdom of Denmark	9 October 1964	15 March 1966	1 January 1973; 25 January 1983		coasts in the North Sea, in the Skagerrak and in the Kattegat, up to the entrances to the Danish Straits
France	5 July 1965	15 March 1966	21 September 1970; 25 January 1983		The North Sea, the English Channel and the European Atlantic coasts
Germany (originally as West Germany, including Land Berlin)	19 January 1970	19 January 1970	21 September 1970; 25 January 1983		The North sea coast
Ireland	20 September 1965	15 March 1966	1 January 1973; 25 January 1983		all coasts
Italy	25 March 1966	25 March 1966	21 September 1970; 25 January 1983		
Luxembourg	not ratified		21 September 1970; 25 January 1983		
Netherlands (territory in Europe)	20 July 1971	20 July 1971	21 September 1970; 25 January 1983		The North Sea coast
Poland	7 June 1966	7 June 1966	21 September 1970; 1 January 1973; 25 January 1983; 1 January 1986; 1 January 1995; 1 May 2004		
Portugal	15 September 1965	15 March 1966	21 September 1970; 1 January 1973; 25 January 1983; 1 January 1986		coasts north of the 36th parallel and the coasts of Madeira
Spain	10 February 1966	15 March 1966	21 September 1970; 1 January 1973; 25 January 1983; 1 January 1986		coasts north of the 36th parallel
Sweden	16 February 1966	15 March 1966	25 January 1983; 1 January 1995		west coast, north of a line drawn from The Kullen (sv) to Gilbjerg Head (sv)
United Kingdom	11 September 1964	15 March 1966	1 January 1973; 25 January 1983	3 July 2017 effective 31 December 2020,	All coasts, including those of the Isle of Man and of the Channel Islands (Jersey and Guernsey [including Alderney and Sark])

=== Denunciation and withdrawal ===
The convention can be denounced after the passage of 20 years from its entry into force, subject to a two-year notice period.

On 2 July 2017 the United Kingdom Government announced that it would withdraw from the Fisheries Convention. Formal notice of the "denunciation" was given the next day, 3 July 2017. The denunciation took effect at the end of the transition phase on 31 December 2020 at 11 pm GMT.

== See also ==
- Brexit
- Common Fisheries Policy
- North Sea Fisheries Convention
