= Astern propulsion =

Use of a ship's propelling mechanism to develop thrust in a retrograde direction

The Sierra signal flag used to convey, "I am operating astern propulsion."

Astern propulsion (as applied to a ship) is a maneuver in which a ship's propelling mechanism is used to develop thrust in a retrograde direction. Astern propulsion does not necessarily imply the ship is moving astern (in reverse); astern propulsion is used to slow a ship by applying a force in the direction of the bow of the ship, instead of the stern. The equivalent concept for an airplane is thrust reversal.

In a sailing ship astern propulsion can be achieved by the appropriate manipulation of the sails. In square-rigged ships 'backing the sails', that is, aligning the sails so that the wind impinged on the bow surface, could provide sufficient retrograde thrust to slow or reverse the ship. This maneuver had to be carried out with care as the rigging of masts and yards was principally designed to accept and transmit thrust in the forward direction.

In a ship with a gas turbine engine and a variable-pitch propeller, astern thrust is simply a matter of changing the propeller pitch to a negative value. Most other propeller-driven ships will reverse the direction the prop spins. For a paddle wheel ship, reversing the direction of the paddle will provide astern propulsion. Redirecting the thrust of a water jet driven craft, changing the cyclic pitch of a Voith-Schneider propulsor, or rotating an azimuth thruster 180 degrees has the same effect. As the efficiency of traditional rudders is greatly reduced when not located in the propeller wash, only propulsion systems with steerable thrust provide adequate maneuverability during astern operation.

A marine vessel is required to signal that she is operating astern propulsion by either blowing three short, easily audible blasts or by flying the Sierra signal flag (white border with one central blue square).

Some aircraft are also able to develop astern propulsion. Airships such as the R-100 could reverse the direction of rotation of some engines, so reversing the direction of thrust of the attached propeller. This facility was used to slow down or stop the airship when mooring.

Some propeller-driven aircraft using controllable pitch propellers can change the blade pitch sufficiently to provide astern propulsion. This facility is sometimes used to control aircraft speed in steep descents, or to taxi backwards when on the ground. Most jet airliners and some transport aircraft use astern propulsion (more commonly termed 'reverse thrust') to slow down after landing, reducing the load on the wheel brakes and shortening the landing rollout. Helicopters can develop thrust in any direction, including astern.

Most mechanically driven land vehicles can develop astern propulsion, although in this case the ability is more usually termed 'reverse'. In land vehicles reverse propulsion is usually achieved through various transmission arrangements.
