= Booze cruise =

British slang for travelling abroad to buy cheap alcohol or tobacco

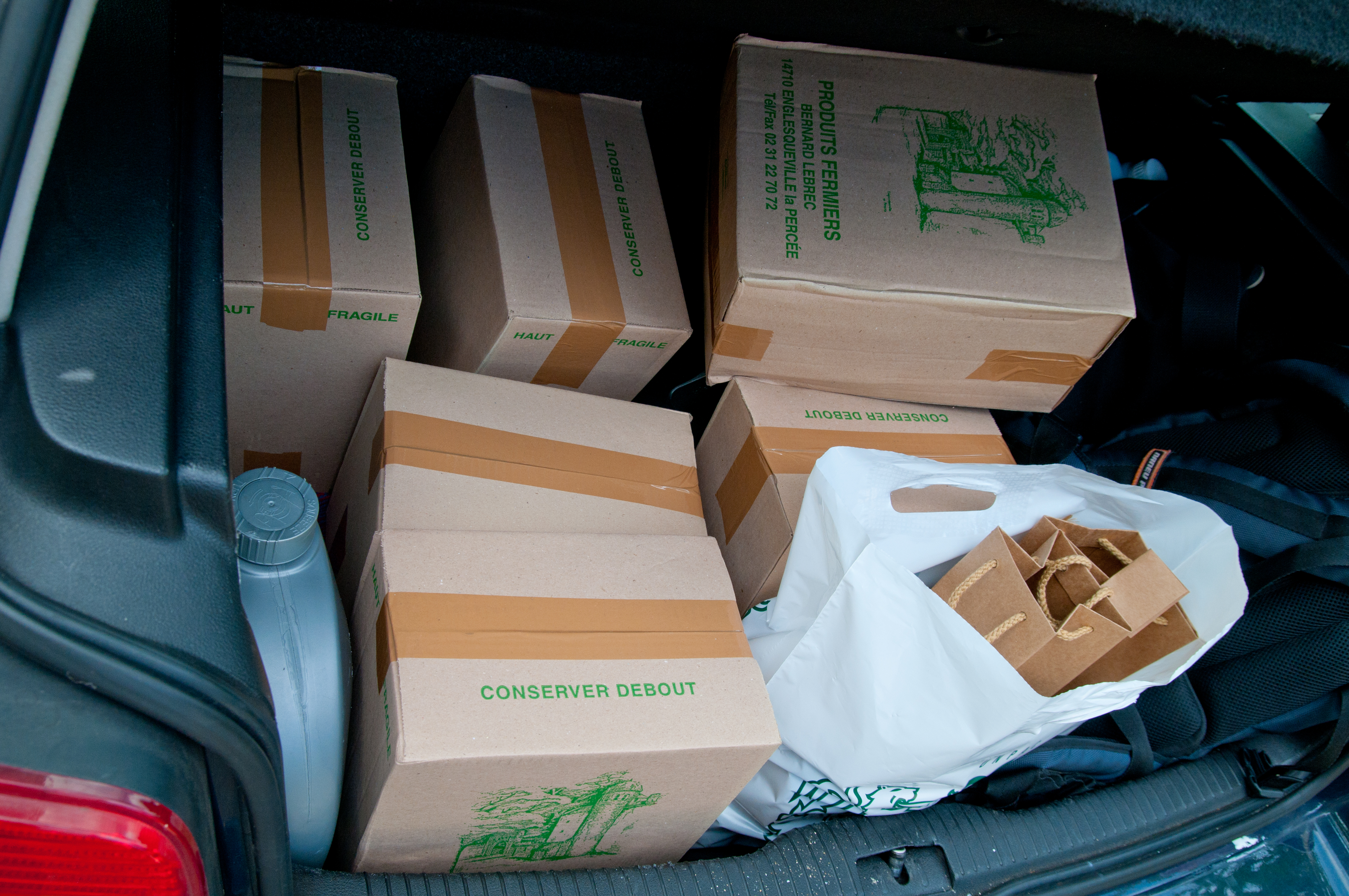
The boot of a car filled with bottles of cider and brandy purchased from Englesqueville-la-Percée in Normandy

In British slang, a booze cruise is a brief trip from Britain to France or Belgium with the intent of taking advantage of lower prices, and buying personal supplies of (especially) alcohol or tobacco in bulk quantities. This process is legally permitted, not to be confused with smuggling.

== Background ==
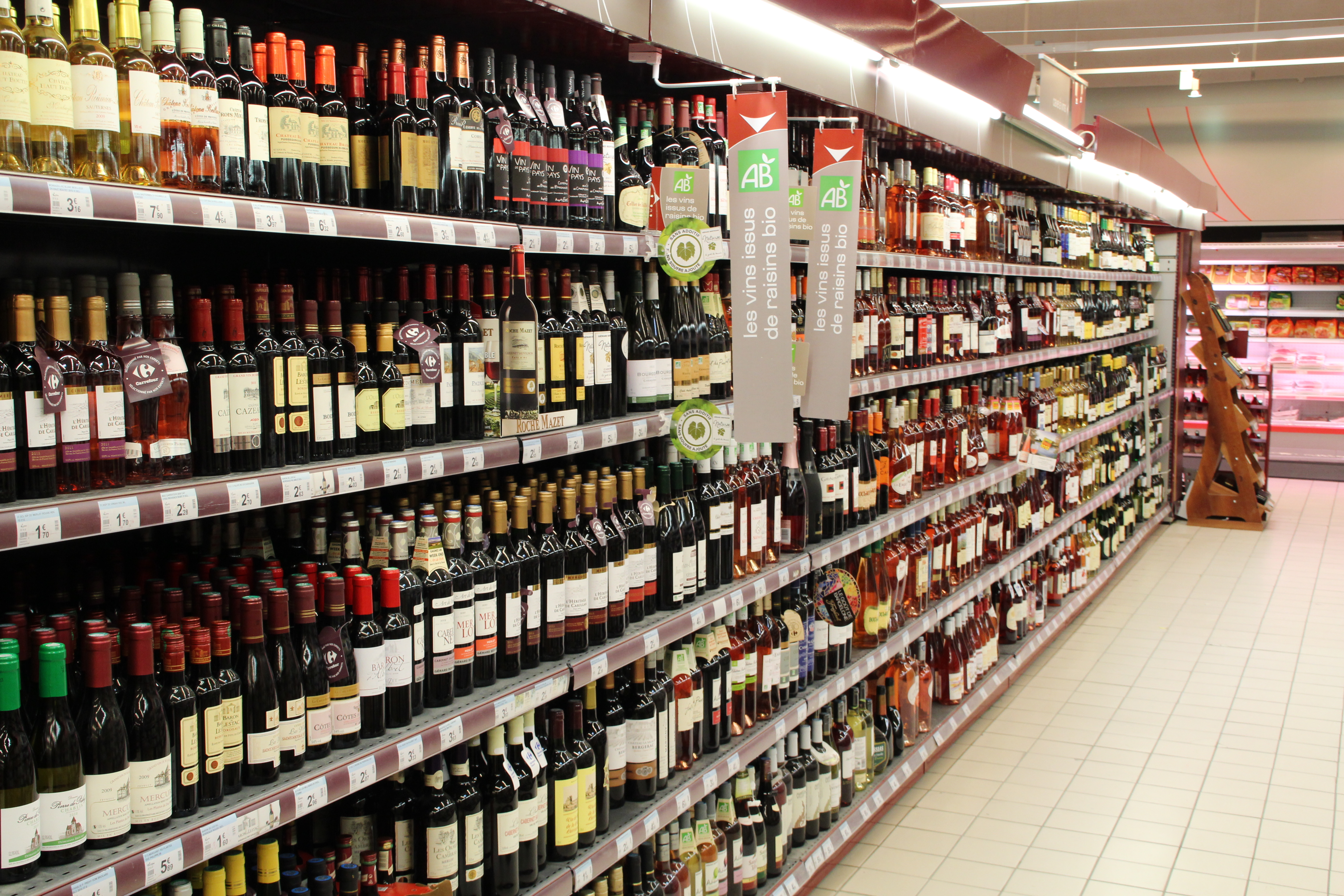
The wine aisle of a French hypermarché

Generally, alcohol and tobacco taxes are lower in France than in Britain. Economically, it makes sense for people to buy their supplies of wine, beer, spirits, and tobacco in bulk in France instead of Britain. There is keen competition between ferry operators and the Channel Tunnel Eurotunnel Shuttle. The day fares to Calais are normally around £60 per vehicle but are sometimes discounted to as little as £10 at off-peak times. Since beer often costs little more than half the English shop price, at worst, the savings defray the cost of a day out.

Serving this market has become big business around the major ferry ports of Calais, Boulogne, and Dunkirk in France, and Ostend in Belgium. Even longer routes from Cherbourg, Normandy and Brittany generate business, boosted by ferries from Ireland where alcohol duties are even higher. The exit route from the Calais ferry port passes several large warehouse retailers (English-owned) that serve the market, and some large British supermarket chains have alcohol-only branches selling bottles identical to those in Britain, but at deep discounts. The French have opened an enormous shopping precinct adjacent to the Channel Tunnel (Cité Europe) that attracts large numbers of British shoppers.

Following large increases in tobacco duty in France, it is now very common for smokers to make a detour to the small town of Adinkerke just over the border in Belgium, where tobacco duty is lower. Many people intending to purchase mainly tobacco products opt for the revitalised service from Dover to Dunkirk, as Dunkirk is much closer to the Belgian border than Calais, and the ferries on this route are slightly more 'smoker-friendly'. Some buying both tobacco and alcohol make a triangular journey (Dover – Dunkirk – Calais – Dover or vice versa).

It is important to differentiate between booze cruisers (who purchase and transport goods legally) and professional smugglers, who often have criminal motives. Genuine booze cruisers are often people 'on a budget', who simply opt to purchase their own personal supplies from 'Shop A' (in France or Belgium) at lower prices than offered at 'Shop B' (in Britain). Booze cruisers normally travel as a family or group of friends, and often take the opportunity to generally have a 'day out' in France and indulge in recreational 'channel shopping' for French produce and unfamiliar foods, clothing and other goods while they are there. In addition to alcohol and tobacco, many other items, including mundane household items such as washing powder and cooking oil are much cheaper in France than the UK.

The cost of getting to France fluctuates due to season and fuel surcharges, but fares for foot passengers remain low. Calais in particular is very well-served by public transport, with the ferry companies also providing a shuttle bus from the ferry terminal to the town centre and (by request) the bus interchange at the SNCF railway station.

French tobacco duties have also risen, reducing further the economic advantage of a "booze cruise". Unless one is close to the Channel ports, it's unlikely to be financially beneficial. The motivation is changing, therefore, from purely economic to leisure and variety of choice.

Originally alcohol purchases on board the ferry had the additional attraction of being duty-free, adding a secondary meaning to booze cruise. Following Brexit, it is possible that duty-free shopping may be reintroduced on cross-Channel ferries, increasing the popularity of booze cruises once again, though limits on personal imports are also likely to be reintroduced.

== Economic impacts ==
The current situation benefits individuals living near to the English south coast who retain an economic advantage by shopping in France. It benefits the entrepreneurs who have businesses around the French ports dependent upon bulk purchases and also other local businesses that benefit from passing trade. The Calais area suffers high unemployment (around 20%) and benefits from the service jobs created by the influx of English day-trippers. The ferry and tunnel operators also benefit from the extra traffic, in a situation that might otherwise be over-supplied.

On the downside, UK taxes (especially on tobacco) seem to have risen beyond the point of diminishing returns, so the British Exchequer loses substantial revenue that might otherwise have been collected to the economies of France and Belgium. Shops (particularly in the English South-East) also report that their trade suffers because taxes make their prices uncompetitive with both legal and illegal imports.

== Legal status ==
=== French law limiting the transport of tobacco ===
A 2006 French law effectively outlawed tobacco tourism which uses France either as a destination or as a route. Under pressure from the tobacco sellers interest group, les bureaux de tabac, and despite the resistance of the French government, the French Parliament enacted a law that makes it illegal to transport more than 200 cigarettes whilst in French territory: fines and confiscation are sanctions if a person is found to be in possession of more than 200 cigarettes whilst travelling through/in France. The law is designed to prevent French citizens buying tobacco in Belgium and Luxembourg.

Following recent tax increases in France it has become more attractive for French citizens to buy tobacco in Belgium and Luxembourg. The law also applies to citizens of other European countries travelling through France with more than 200 cigarettes in their possession. There is a suggestion that the law is incompatible with European Commission directives which demand freedom of movement and goods, for personal use, across the borders of European Union countries excluding specifically named "new member states".

=== UK Customs ===
EU Directive 92/12 Article 8 states: "As regards products acquired by private individuals for their own use and transported by them... excise duty shall be charged in the member state in which they are acquired".

In answer to a legal challenge; a European Court of Justice ruling on 23 November 2006 overturned their own Advocate-General's advice and reconfirmed that: "only products acquired and transported personally by private individuals are exempt from excise duty in the member state of importation". This ruling effectively thwarted the hoped-for option of ordering goods (particularly tobacco), via Internet, from low duty states in the European Union and having them posted to a United Kingdom address, causing discussion in the British media about how a supposed 'Free Trade Area' seems to work for the benefit of some but not others.

The current position is: people may personally bring into Britain with them unlimited amounts of alcohol and/or tobacco from another EU member state, provided that they have been legally purchased (with the relevant local rate of duty paid) in the member state of origin, and are for either personal consumption, or as a genuine gift to another. Importing goods for resale at a profit, or even 'not for profit' proxy purchases on behalf of non-travelling third parties is not permitted.

Although fully aware of this, HM Revenue and Customs (HMRC), faced with widespread abuse by smugglers, impose guidelines - limits based on what they are prepared to believe are reasonable amounts for personal consumption (nominally six months' supply). Most travellers are unaffected, but there are instances of infrequent trippers forward-buying large supplies of (for example) their favourite brand of cigarette, and falling foul of the 'limits' intended to deal with professional smugglers.

HMRC have the legal right to stop and search any vehicle. As their main duty is to detect smuggled goods and other illegal imports, they can use their own common sense regarding unconcealed (i.e. openly carried) goods above their limits, if they are happy that the goods are genuinely for personal consumption. Generally, suspicion will only be aroused if the goods start to look less like a personal purchase, and more like a commercial operation. For example: importing more different brands of tobacco products than there are adult travellers in the vehicle arouses particular suspicion, as most smokers tend to remain loyal to one particular brand. However, there have been reported cases of more extreme treatment (especially where people have unnecessarily concealed extra goods in vehicle cavities, spare wheel wells etc.), with family cars and contents being confiscated on the spot and the travellers left stranded at Dover in the dead of night. This has led to legal challenges to the powers of HMRC, citing the heavy-handedness and inconsistency of some actions, and their dubious legality under European law.

A variation on the standard booze cruise was an ill-fated offshore off-licence which operated briefly off Hartlepool in 2004.

After Brexit in 2020, legal status may have changed.

== See also ==
- Rip-off Britain
- Border trade
- Parallel import
