= International maritime signal flags =

Flags used for naval communication

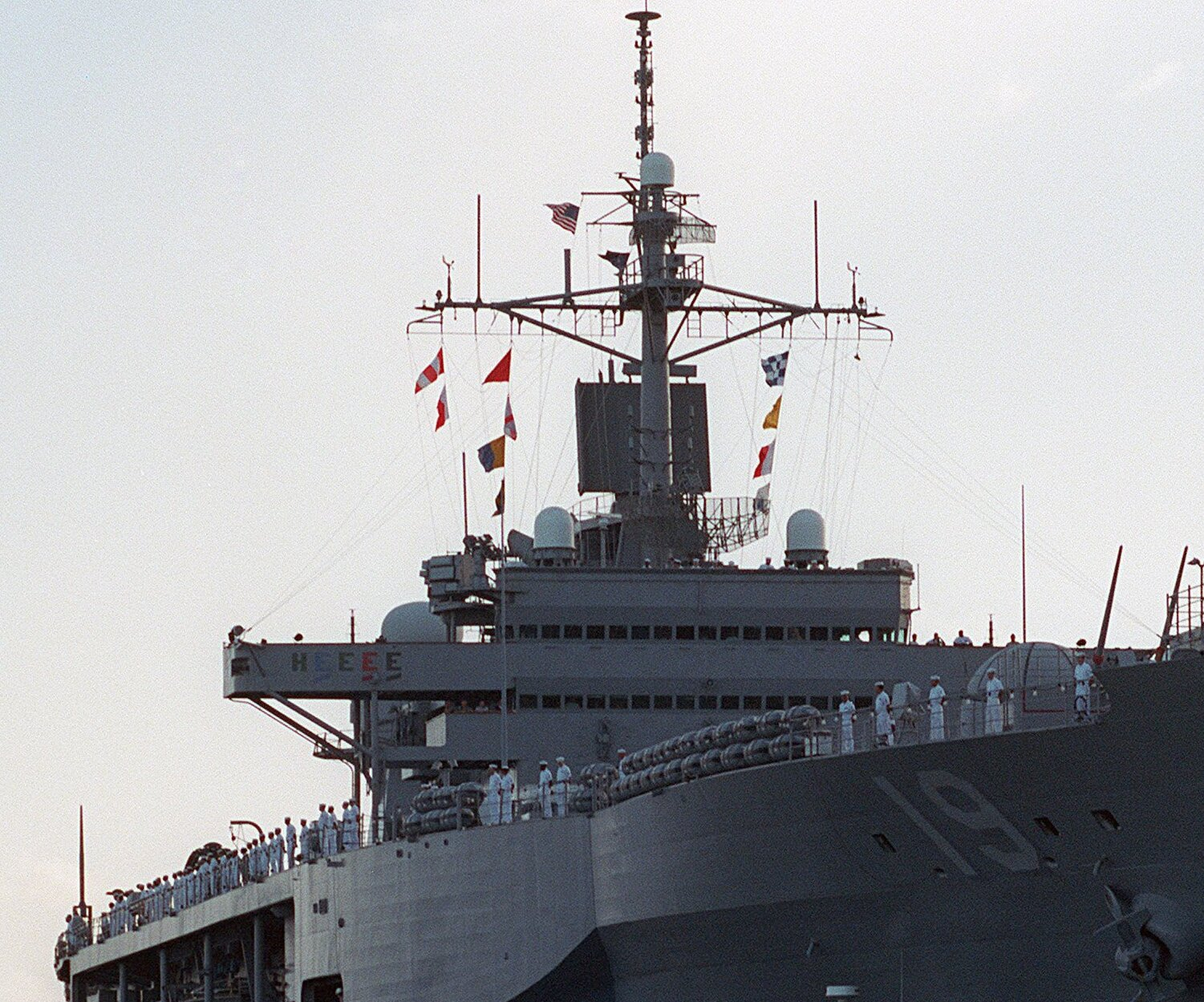
USS Blue Ridge (LCC-19) displaying signal flags indicating a pilot aboard, a coded message, and her callsign, "NQHS"

International maritime signal flags are standarized flags used to communicate with ships. The principal system of flags and associated codes is the International Code of Signals. Various navies have flag systems with additional flags and codes, and other flags are used in special uses, or have historical significance.

== Usage ==
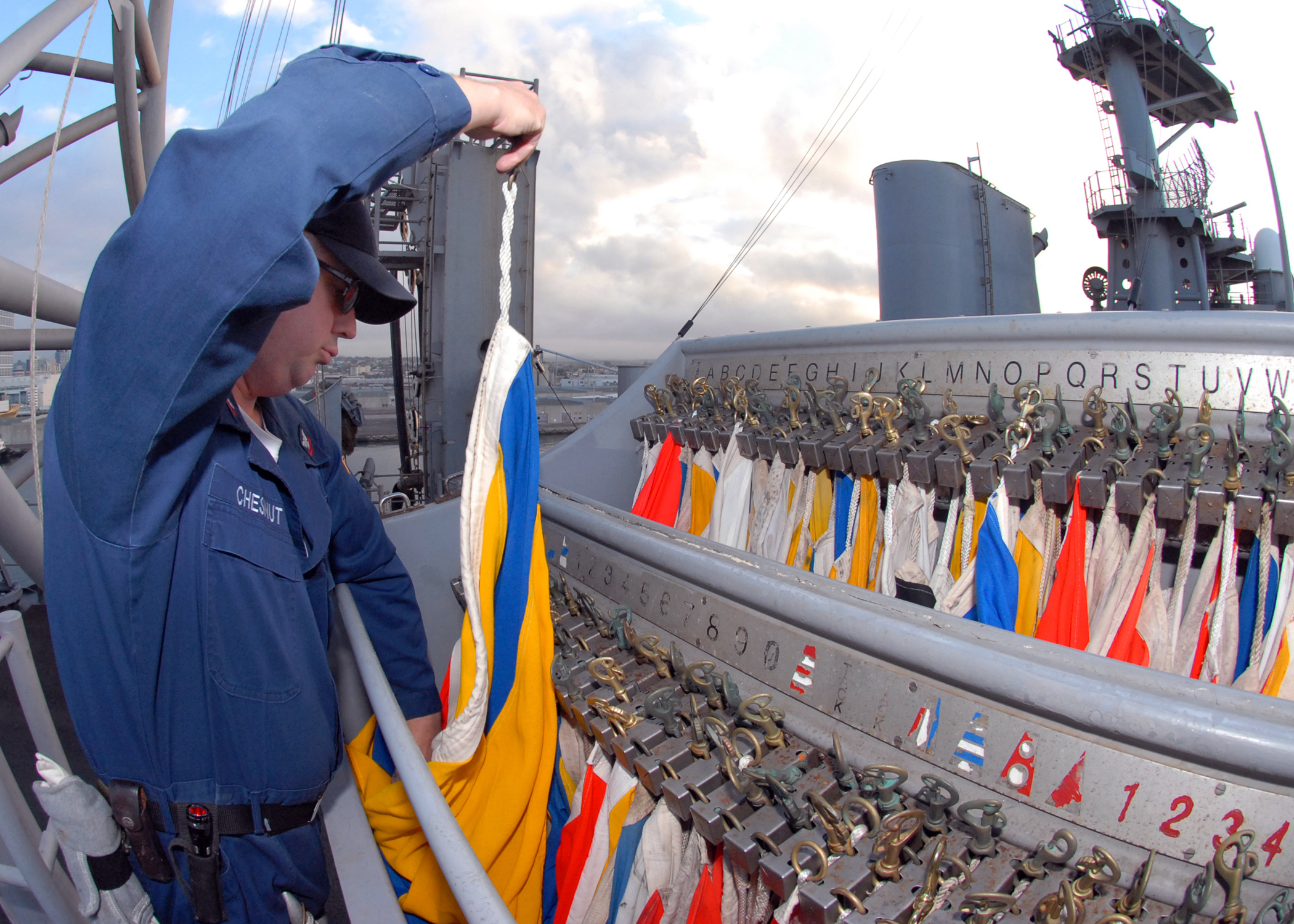
Sailor prepares signal flags for operations at sea

There are various methods by which the flags can be used as signals:

- A series of flags can spell out a message, each flag representing a letter.
- Individual flags have specific and standard meanings; for example, diving support vessels raise the "A" (Alfa) flag indicating their inability to move from their current location because they have a diver underwater and to warn other vessels to keep clear to avoid endangering the diver(s) with their propellers.
- One or more flags can form a code word whose meaning differs from the standard code, such as when used by various navies or private organizations. An example is the Popham numeric code used at the Battle of Trafalgar.
  - U.S. Navy and Coast Guard vessels typically fly their maritime call sign or other identifying flags from their port signal halyards, and starboard signal halyards for outgoing messages.
  - NATO uses the same flags and protocols, with a few unique to warships, alone or in short sets to communicate various unclassified messages. The NATO usage generally differs from the international meanings, and therefore warships will fly the Code/answer flag above a signal to indicate it should be read using the international meaning, as seen in the image of USS Blue Ridge above.
- In yacht and dinghy racing, flags have other meanings; for example, the P (Papa) flag is used as the "preparatory" flag to indicate an imminent start, and the S (Sierra) flag means "shortened course" (for more details see Race signals).

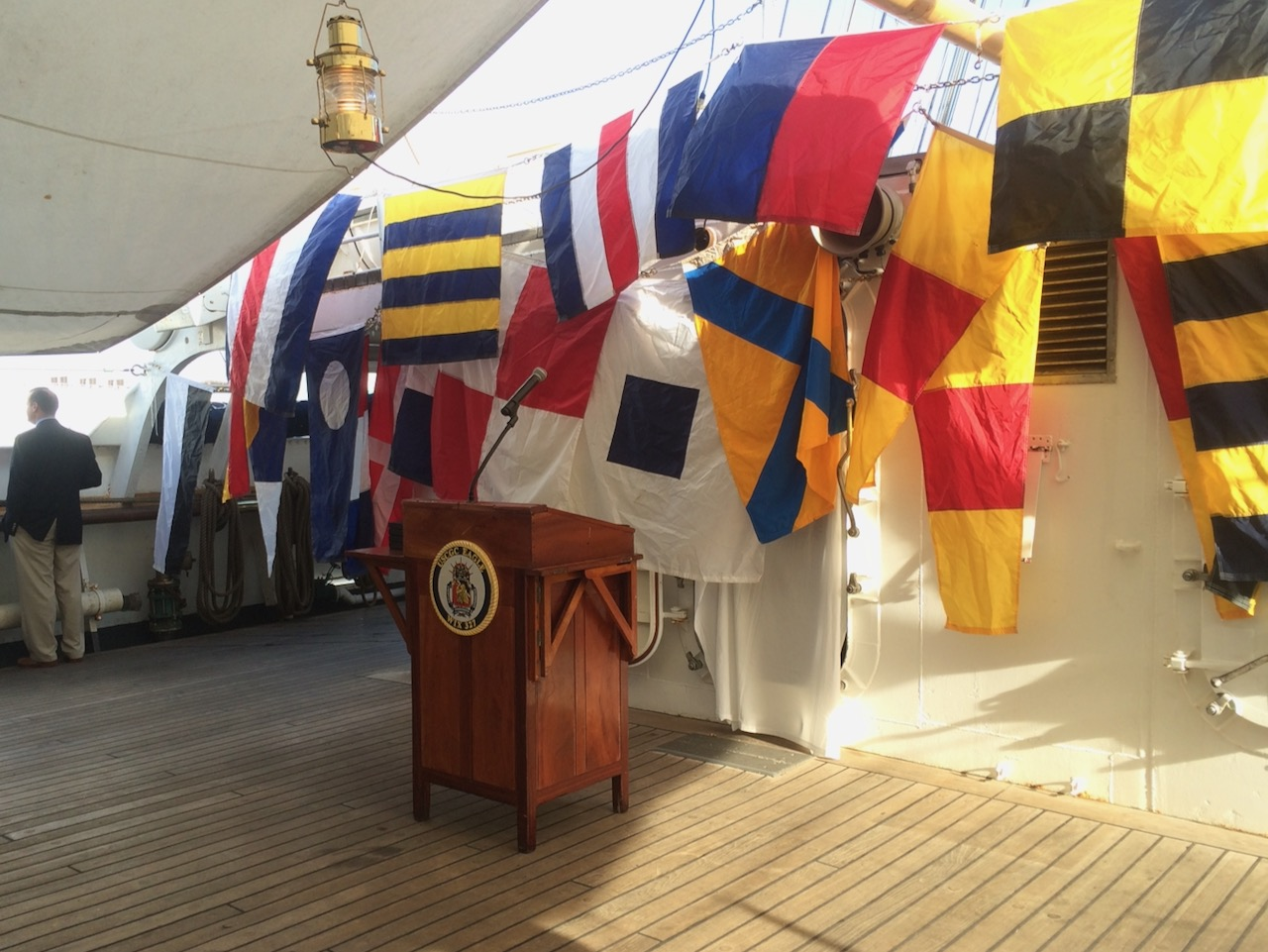
Example of signal flags used as decoration aboard USCGC Eagle

During the Allied occupations of Axis countries after World War II, use and display of those nations' national flags was banned. In order to comply with the international legal requirement that a ship identify its registry by displaying the appropriate national ensign, swallow-tailed versions of the C, D, and E signal flags were designated as, respectively, provisional German, Okinawan, and Japanese civil ensigns. Being swallowtails, they are commonly referred to as the "C-pennant" (German: C-Doppelstander), "D-pennant", and "E-pennant".

Additionally, signal flags can be used as decoration for special occasions or strung in a line from the bow, mast(s), and to the stern, when dressing ship in no particular order or meaning. This use can also be seen in homes attempting to convey a nautical style.

== Letter flags (with ICS meaning) ==
Letter flags and ICS meanings
Letter / radio name	Flag	Blazon	ICS meaning as single flag	Meaning when used with numeric complements
A Alfa		Swallowtailed, per pale argent and azure	"I have a diver down; keep well clear at slow speed."	Azimuth or bearing
B Bravo		Swallowtailed, gules	"I am taking in or discharging or carrying dangerous goods." (Originally used by the Royal Navy specifically for military explosives.)	
C Charlie		Azure, a fess gules fimbriated argent	"Affirmative." (Note: November and Charlie together ("NC" / "no" and "yes") is used as a distress signal.) (Note: Also signallable on a ship's whistle using Morse code. See International Code of Signals.)	Magnetic bearing
D Delta		Or, a Spanish fess azure	"Keep clear of me; I am maneuvering with difficulty."	Date
E Echo		Per fess azure and gules	"I am altering my course to starboard."	
F Foxtrot		Argent, a lozenge throughout gules	"I am disabled; communicate with me." (Note: Historically, in a CAM ship during World War II, Foxtrot was used to warn about launching the interceptor aircraft from the deck catapult.)	
G Golf		Paly of six or and azure	"I require a pilot." By fishing vessels near fishing grounds: "I am hauling nets."	Longitude (The first 2 or 3 digits denote degrees; the last 2 denote minutes.)
H Hotel		Per pale argent and gules	"I have a pilot on board."	
I India		Or, a pellet	"I am altering my course to port."	
J Juliett		Azure, a fess argent	"I am on fire and have dangerous cargo on board: keep well clear of me." or "I am leaking dangerous cargo."	
K Kilo		Per pale or and azure	"I wish to communicate with you."	"I wish to communicate with you by...": 1) Semaphore signaling by hand-flags or arms; 2) Loud hailer (megaphone); 3) Morse signaling lamp; 4) Sound signals.
L Lima		Quarterly or and sable	"Stop immediately."	Latitude (the first 2 digits denote degrees; the last 2 denote minutes.)
M Mike		Azure, a saltire argent	"My vessel is stopped and making no way through the water."	
N November		Chequy of sixteen azure and argent	"Negative."	
O Oscar		Per bend gules and or	"Man overboard." (often attached to the man overboard pole on boats). With a sinister hoist, the semaphore flag.	
P Papa		Azure, an inescutcheon argent	The Blue Peter. In harbour: All persons should report on board as the vessel is about to proceed to sea. At sea: It may be used by fishing vessels to mean: "My nets have come fast upon an obstruction."	
Q Quebec		Or	"My vessel is 'healthy' and I request free pratique."	
R Romeo		Gules, a cross or	No ICS meaning as single flag. Prior to 1969: "The way is off my ship; you may feel your way past me."	Distance (range) in nautical miles.
S Sierra		Argent, an inescutcheon azure	"I am operating astern propulsion."	Speed (velocity) in knots
T Tango		Tierced in pale gules, argent and azure	"Keep clear of me." Fishing boats: "Keep clear of me; I am engaged in pair trawling."	Local time. (The first 2 digits denote hours; the last 2 denote minutes.)
U Uniform		Quarterly gules and argent	"You are running into danger." (Note: In Japan, the "U" (Uniform) flag is now also used to indicate a tsunami warning, although the ICS recommends the flag combination "ND" (November + Delta) for such a warning.)	
V Victor		Argent, a saltire gules	"I require assistance."	Velocity in kilometres per hour.
W Whiskey		Azure, an inescutcheon gules fimbriated argent	"I require medical assistance."	
X Xray		Argent, a cross azure	"Stop carrying out your intentions and watch for my signals."	
Y Yankee		Bendy sinister of ten or and gules	"I am dragging my anchor."	
Z Zulu		Per saltire or, sable, gules and azure	"I require a tug." By fishing vessels near fishing grounds: "I am shooting nets." (Note: The Z (Zulu) flag was also famously hoisted by Admiral Heihachiro Togo at the 1905 Battle of Tsushima as the Japanese fleet prepared to engage the Russian fleet. In Japanese coding at the time, the flag meant, "The fate of the Empire rests on the outcome of this battle. Let each man do his utmost." (皇國ノ興廢此ノ一戰ニ在リ、各員一層奮勵努力セヨ))	Time (UTC). (The first 2 digits denote hours; the last 2 denote minutes.)

== Number flags ==
NATO number flags
Number	NATO flag	ICS flag	Blazons
0 Zero			NATO: Argent, five crosses hummetty azure in saltire ICS: Or, a pale gules
1 One			NATO: Gules, a fess or ICS: Argent, a torteau
2 Two			NATO: Or, a fess gules ICS: Azure, a plate
3 Three			NATO: Azure, a fess gules ICS: Tierced in pale gules, argent and azure
4 Four			NATO: Gules, a saltire argent ICS: Gules, a cross of Saint Philip argent
5 Five			NATO: Or, a saltire azure ICS: Per pale or and azure
6 Six			NATO: Bendy sinister of seven argent and azure ICS: Per fess sable and argent
7 Seven			NATO: Gules, a pale argent ICS: Per fess or and gules
8 Eight			NATO: Or, a pale azure ICS: Argent, a cross of Saint Philip gules
9 Nine			NATO: Azure, a pale argent ICS: Quarterly argent, sable, gules and or
. / ½ Point/One Half (also code/answer)			ICS: Paleways of five pieces, gules and argent (when used as an answering pennant, flown above a reply)

== Substitute ==
Substitute or repeater flags allow messages with duplicate characters to be signaled without the need for multiple sets of flags.

The four NATO substitute flags are as follows:

	First substitute	Second substitute	Third substitute	Fourth substitute
Blazon	Triangular, or, a bordure azure which does not touch the dexter end	Triangular, per pale azure and argent	Triangular, argent, a fess sable	Triangular, gules, a square or in the fess position touching the dexter end

The International Code of Signals includes only the first three of these substitute flags. To illustrate their use, here are some messages and the way they would be encoded:

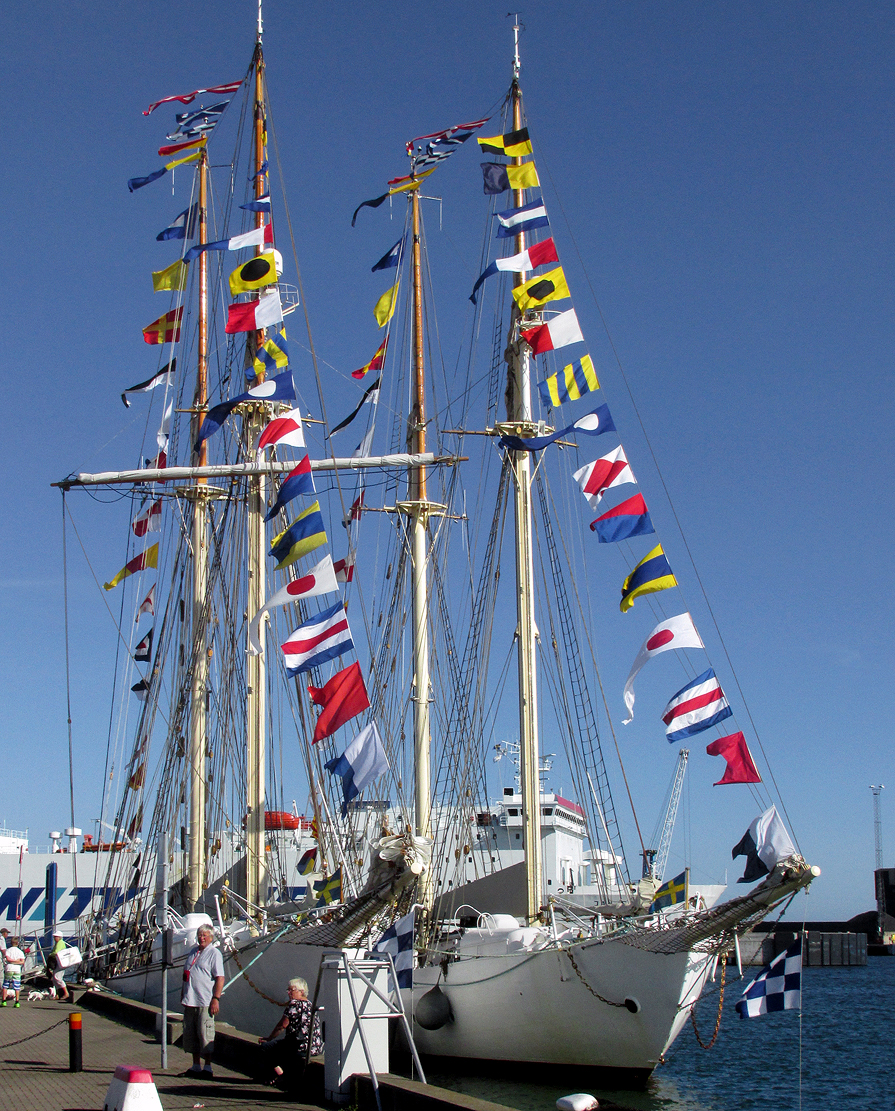
Two sail boats dressed overall with signal flags.

"N"
"O"
"NO"
"NON"
"NOO"
"NOON"
"NONO"
"NONON"
"NONNN"

== See also ==
- Bravo Zulu
- Character encoding
- Day shapes
- Diver down flag
- Dressing overall
- "England expects that every man will do his duty"
- "The fate of the Empire rests on the outcome of this battle"
- Flag of Germany after World War II (C-Pennant)
- Flag semaphore
- Heliograph
- International Code of Signals
- International inspection pennant
- List of international common standards
- NATO phonetic alphabet
- Signal lamp
- Yellow Jack
