= Offshore off-licence =

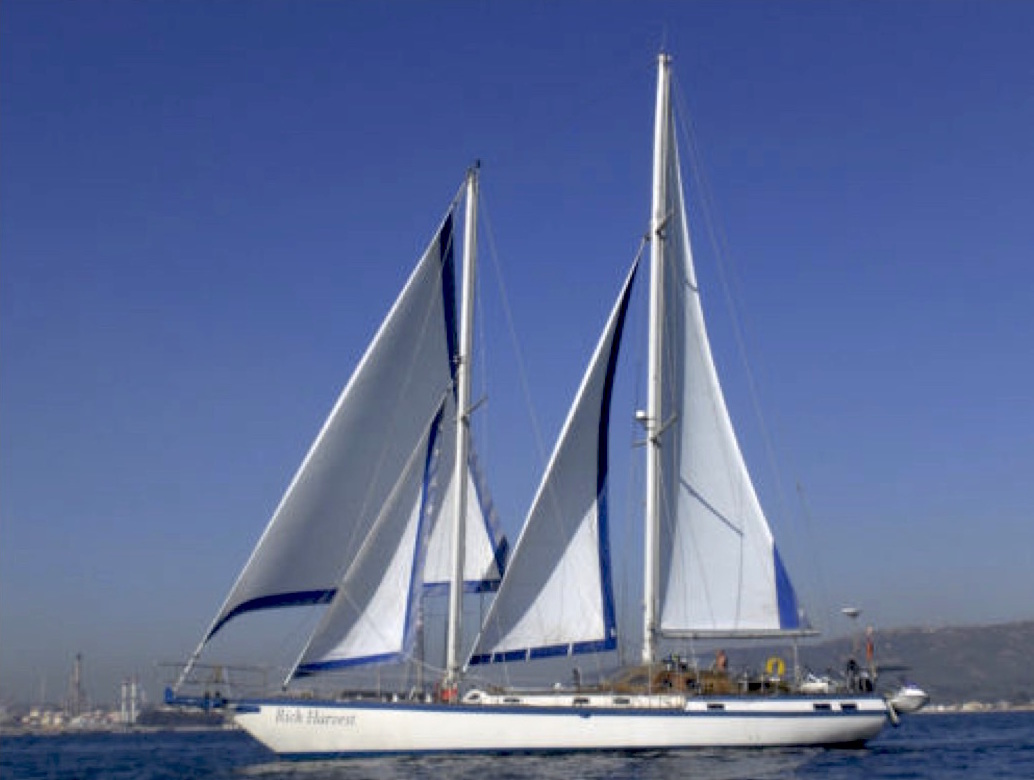
Staysail schooner Rich Harvest

The offshore off-licence is the name coined by the media to describe a 2004 venture to bring "tax- and duty-free" alcohol and cigarettes to Teesside, England, by selling the imported goods from a boat anchored just outside the UK's 12-mile limit. Two businessmen, Phil Berriman and Trevor Lyons, a maritime law expert, used the latter's 72-foot staysail schooner Rich Harvest to transport large quantities of cigarettes and spirits from Heligoland (a tiny island in the German Bight, off Jutland, which is outside the EU VAT area) to Hartlepool. The vessel was anchored a little more than 12 miles offshore, and people from Hartlepool came out in private boats to buy the untaxed goods. Customers would then ostensibly be allowed to bring their purchases into the UK using their duty-free allowance.

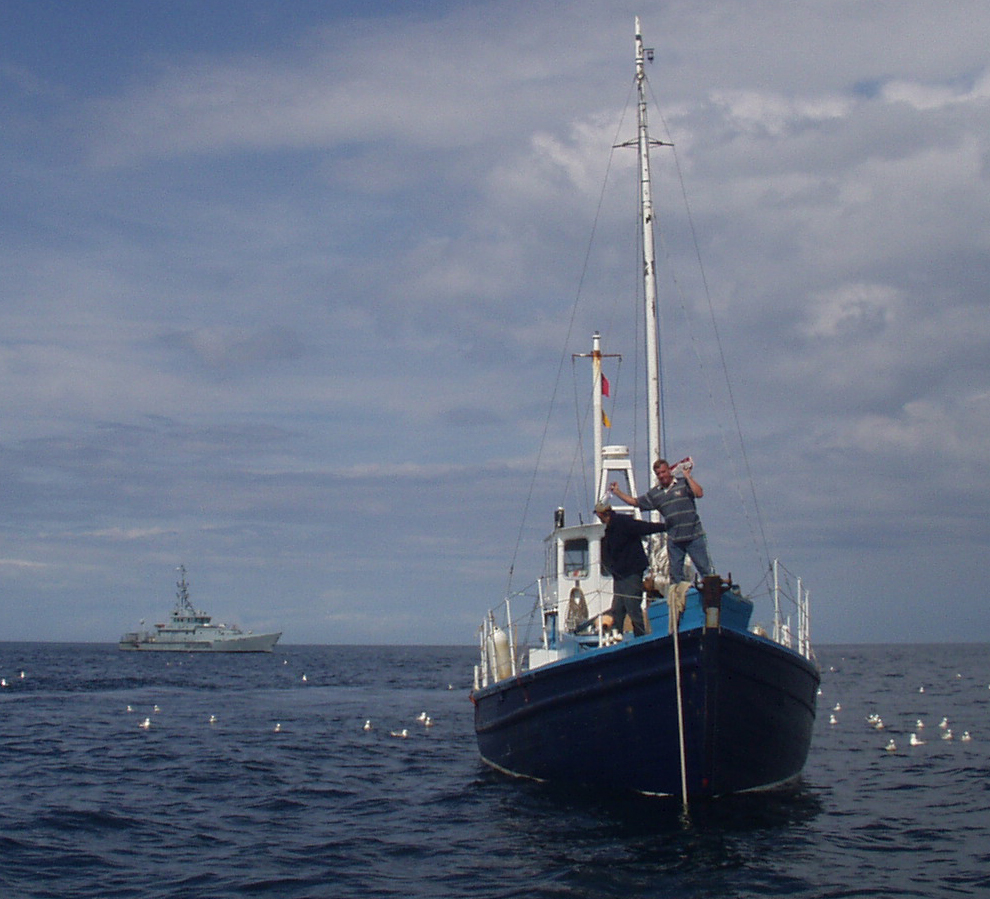
Cornish Maiden with Lyons and Berriman on deck; (and an HMRC cutter in attendance).

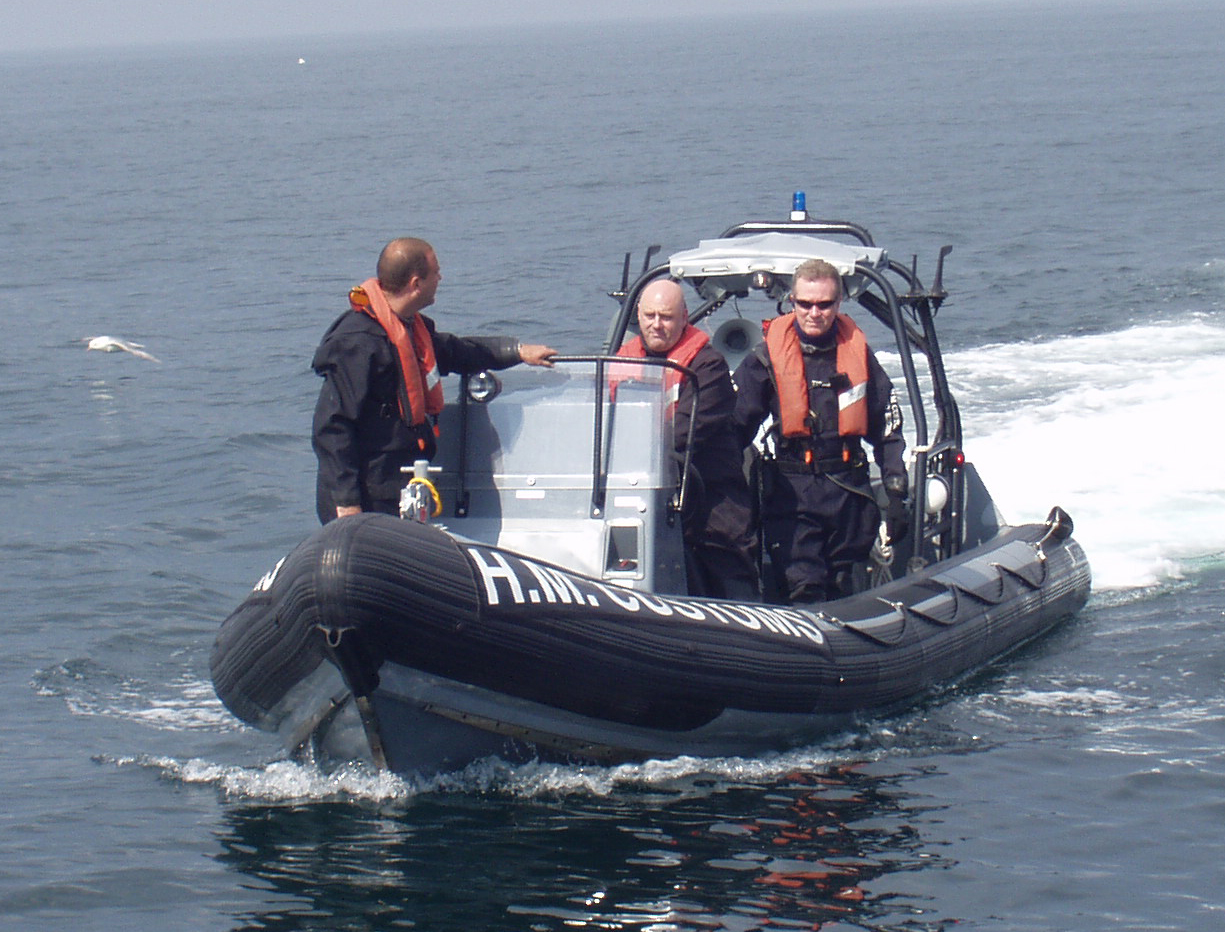
A Customs RHIB approaches the Cornish Maiden

After a storm, the Rich Harvest put into port, flying the yellow Q flag to notify HM Customs & Excise (now HM Revenue & Customs) that dutiable goods were aboard. Customs officers were unsure what to do, and at first merely sought to make the vessel secure, to prevent unlawful unloading; but the next day, the Customs hierarchy ordered the vessel to leave port within 36 hours. Then, just as the vessel was about to leave, Customs changed their mind and refused to allow the vessel and its cargo to depart. The cargo was seized and taken to a bonded Customs warehouse. Some weeks later, Customs decided to return the goods, but demanded that they be exported immediately. The goods were loaded onto a different vessel, a former Trinity House support vessel called the Cornish Maiden. The much more valuable Rich Harvest was not used this time, in case it became liable to seizure and forfeiture.

The Cornish Maiden (which belonged to Berriman) motored to a position 12 miles off Hartlepool, where it anchored and made ready for trade. By this time, a 42-metre (138 ft) Customs cutter was waiting, and stayed in attendance throughout daylight hours. Hartlepool residents who came out to buy goods were followed back to shore by a Customs RHIB from the cutter. Potential buyers were scared off when Customs then announced that they would "seize any boat that visited" the Cornish Maiden. From then on, no sales were made, except to journalists and cameramen from national newspapers. These media people bought token amounts of goods, but on arrival onshore, these goods were either seized or extra duty demanded. There were no further sales, and after the cutter gave warning that another storm was imminent, the Cornish Maiden packed up and headed for port.

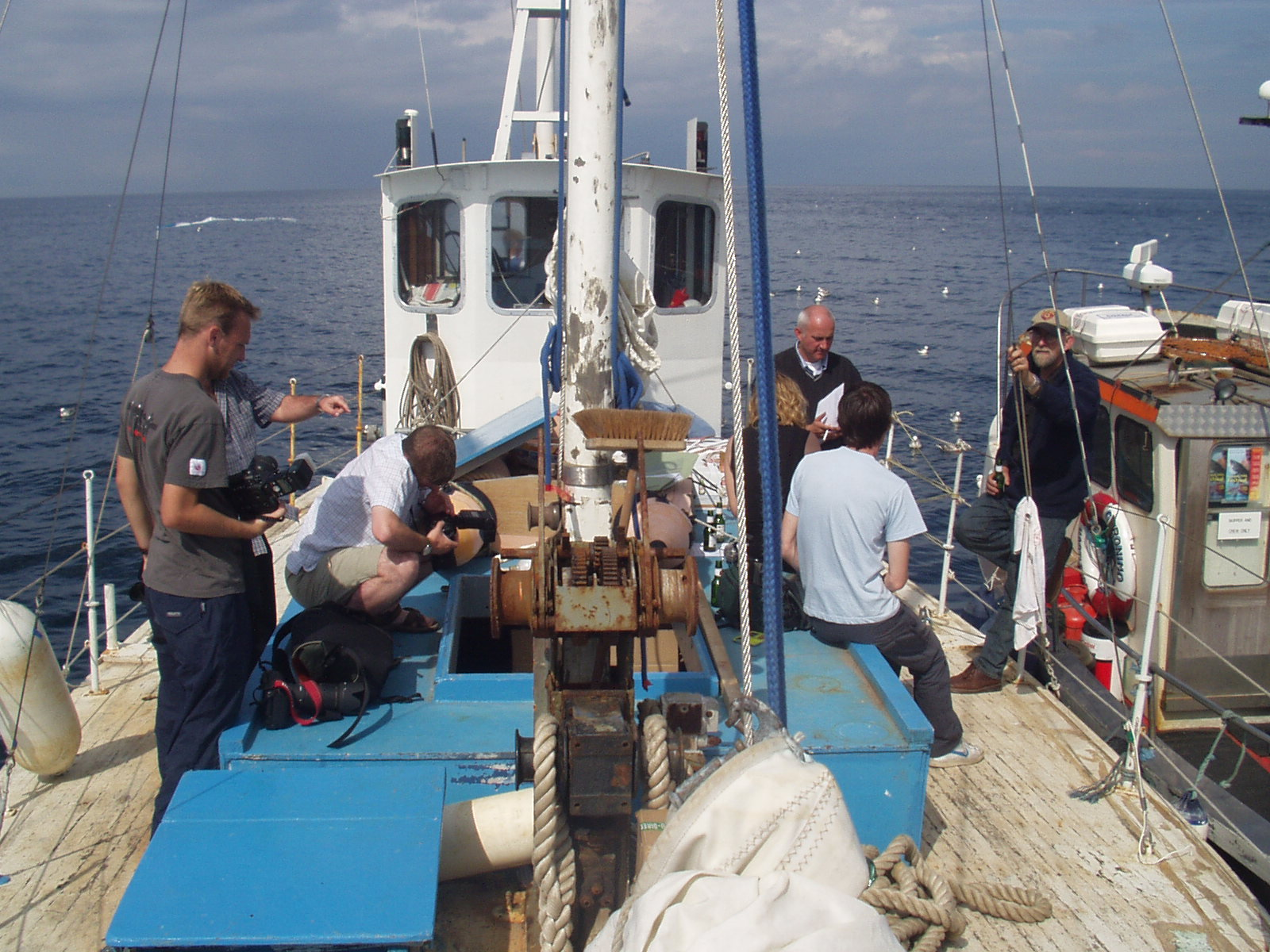
Journalists visit the Cornish Maiden

The cargo was then seized again by Customs, who had obtained a magistrates' court order for the cargo to be impounded. On appeal at Middlesbrough Crown Court, the judge held that magistrates were wrong, and ordered the goods to be returned, saying both that the "offshore off-licence" was not unlawful and that HMRC's seizure of the cargo was wrong-headed and unconscionable. Customs appealed to the divisional court for an appellate review. On behalf of the venture, barrister Jeremy White relied on the Factortame case, arguing that HMRC's import regulations were arbitrary, restrictive and void for conflicting with the higher authority of EU law; but the divisional court, reminiscent of the majority in Liversidge v Anderson, rejected this claim and ordered the case to be reheard in Middlesbrough. At this second Crown Court hearing, a new judge took a rather different view, holding that Customs had been entitled to seize the cargo. Customs claimed that a duty-free allowance could be claimed only if one had been abroad.

== Cape Verde ==
Around 2016, the schooner was stolen and taken to Brazil, where she was loaded with over a tonne of cocaine. She then sailed to the Cape Verde islands, crewed by young amateur yachtsmen who had signed on without pay to gain ocean experience. On arrival at Cape Verde, the crew (who claimed to be unaware of the presence of any contraband cargo) were arrested, convicted and given heavy jail sentences. The families began a campaign and this issue became a cause célébre. Eventually the Cape Verde authorities were satisfied that the crew were indeed innocent, and they were released from jail. A 2024 BBC TV investigation, "Finding Mr Fox" looked into the identity of George Saul, alias "Mr Fox". The film showed that after the Customs seized the vessel was seized and found to have drugs aboard, Rich Harvest somehow sank in Mindelo harbour, on the island of São Vicente, Cape Verde, even though the yacht was in the care and custody of the authorities
