= Yellow Jack (flag) =

Maritime flag communicating presence or absence of disease on-board

A "Double Quebec" flying from a ship would signal "I require health clearance."

The Yellow Jack ("Quebec") signal flag, is a plain yellow banner that was historically used to signify a vessel was, or might be, harboring a dangerous disease and needed to be quarantined (the flag represents the letter “Q”).

A ship flying two Quebecs ("QQ"), or "Double Quebec", is signaling: "I require health clearance." In both cases, if and when free pratique is granted, the vessel may lower the Quebec(s), raise the national ensign of the port, and do business there. In the event that, for health reasons, the vessel is not granted free pratique, it continues to fly the Quebec, in effect indicating that it is in quarantine until such time as any health concern is resolved.

In international maritime signal flags, plain yellow, green, and black flags have been used to symbolize disease in ships and ports. The color yellow has a longer history. It was used to mark houses of infection prior to its maritime use.

Yellow jack also became a name for yellow fever. Cholera-infected ships also used a yellow flag.

The plain yellow flag ("Q" or "Quebec" in international maritime signal flags), may derive its letter symbol from its initial use in "quarantine".

In some Indonesian cities such as Jakarta, plain yellow flags are commonly used to mark a recent death, regardless of cause. They are placed in intersections leading to the home of the recently deceased as direction markers for mourners, and to mark the funeral convoy, so that it is given the right of way.

The Yellow Jack was also used to signify the time of execution of two Royal Navy sailors condemned by a court-martial. At Portsmouth on 7 Aug 1800, at nine o'clock, a gun was fired on board the Royal William, at Spithead, and the yellow flag hoisted as a signal for executing J. Watson and J. Allen, who were condemned as being concerned in the mutiny on board HMS Hermione (1782). The signal being repeated, the yellow flag was hoisted on board the Puissant at Spithead, and the Braakel in the harbour, on board which ships they were executed. Boats from all the ships at Spithead, manned and armed with marines, attended the Puissant as those in the harbour did the Braakel.
