= Military academy =

Higher education institution operated by or for the military

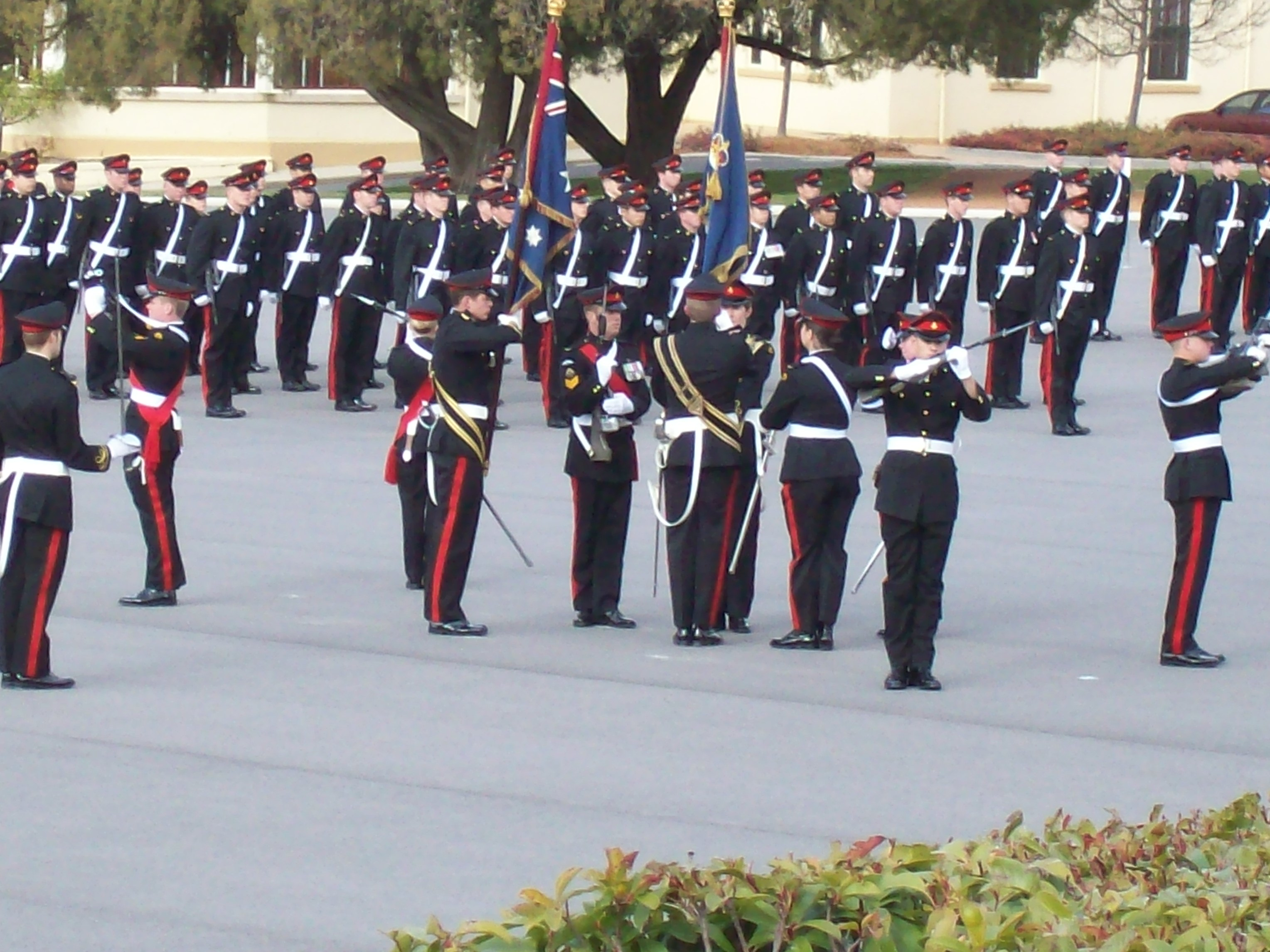
A graduation parade of the Royal Military College, Duntroon

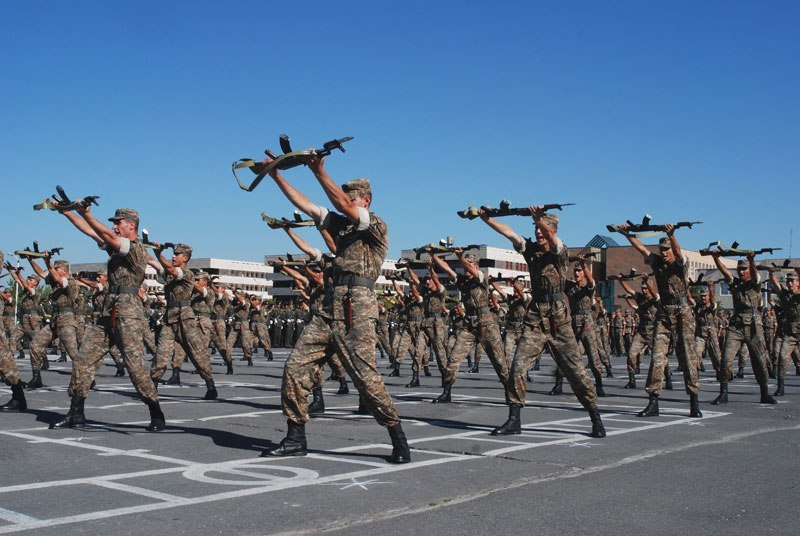
Armenian soldiers at the Vazgen Sargsyan Military University in 2013

A military academy or service academy is an educational institution which prepares candidates for service in the officer corps. It normally provides education in a military environment, the exact definition depending on the country concerned.

Different types of academy exist: for example, pre-collegiate-level institutions awarding academic qualifications, university-level institutions awarding bachelor's-degree-level qualifications, and those preparing officer cadets for commissioning into the armed services of the state.

== History ==
The first military academies were established in the 17th and 18th centuries to provide future officers for technically specialized corps, such as military engineers and artillery, with scientific training.

The Italian Military Academy was inaugurated in Turin on January 1, 1678, as the Savoy Royal Academy, making it the oldest military academy in existence. The Royal Danish Naval Academy was set up in 1701. The Royal Military Academy, Woolwich was set up in 1741, after a false start in 1720 because of a lack of funds, as the earliest military academy in Britain. Its original purpose was to train cadets entering the Royal Artillery and Royal Engineers. In France, the École Royale du Génie at Mézières was founded in 1748, followed by a non-technical academy in 1751, the École Royale Militaire offering a general military education to the nobility. French military academies were widely copied in Prussia, Austria, Russia. The Norwegian Military Academy in Oslo, educates officers of the Norwegian Army. The academy was established in 1750, and is the oldest institution for higher education in Norway.

By the turn of the century, under the impetus of the Napoleonic Wars and the strain that the armies of Europe subsequently came under, military academies for the training of commissioned officers of the army were set up in most of the combatant nations. These military schools had two functions: to provide instruction for serving officers in the functions of the efficient staff-officer, and to school youngsters before they gained an officer's commission. The Kriegsakademie in Prussia was founded in 1801 and the École spéciale militaire de Saint-Cyr was created by order of Napoleon Bonaparte in 1802 as a replacement for the École Royale Militaire of the Ancien Régime (the institution that Napoleon himself had graduated from).

The Royal Military College, Sandhurst, in England was the brainchild of John Le Marchant in 1801, who established schools for the military instruction of officers at High Wycombe and Great Marlow, with a grant of £30,000 from Parliament. The two original departments were later combined and moved to Sandhurst.

In the United States, the United States Military Academy (USMA) in West Point, New York was founded on March 16, 1802, and is one of five service academies in the nation.

== Types ==
=== Pre-collegiate institutions ===
A military school teaches children of various ages (elementary school, middle school or high school) in a military environment which includes training in military aspects, such as drill. Many military schools are also boarding schools, and others are simply magnet schools in a larger school system. Many are privately run institutions, though some are public and are run either by a public school system (such as the Chicago Public Schools) or by a state.

=== Adult institutions ===
A college-level military academy is an institute of higher learning of things military. It is part of a larger system of military education and training institutions. The primary educational goal at military academies is to provide a high quality education that includes significant coursework and training in the fields of military tactics and military strategy. The amount of non-military coursework varies by both the institution and the country, and the amount of practical military experience gained varies as well.

Military academies may or may not grant university degrees. In the US, graduates have a major field of study, earning a Bachelor's degree in that subject just as at other universities. However, in British academies, the graduate does not achieve a university degree, since the whole of the one-year course (undertaken mainly but not exclusively by university graduates) is dedicated to military training.

Graduates from national academies are typically commissioned as officers in the country's military. The new officers usually have an obligation to serve for a certain number of years. In some countries (e.g. Britain) all military officers train at the appropriate academy, whereas in others (e.g. the United States) only a percentage do and the service academies are seen as institutions which supply service-specific officers within the forces (about 15 percent of US military officers).

State or private-run academy graduates have no requirement to join the military after graduation, although some schools have a high rate of graduate military service. Today, most of these schools have ventured away from their military roots and now enroll both military and civilian students. The only exception in the United States is the Virginia Military Institute which remains all-military.

== Albania ==
- Armed Forces Academy

== Angola ==
- Army Military Academy
- National Air Force Academy
- Naval Academy

== Argentina ==
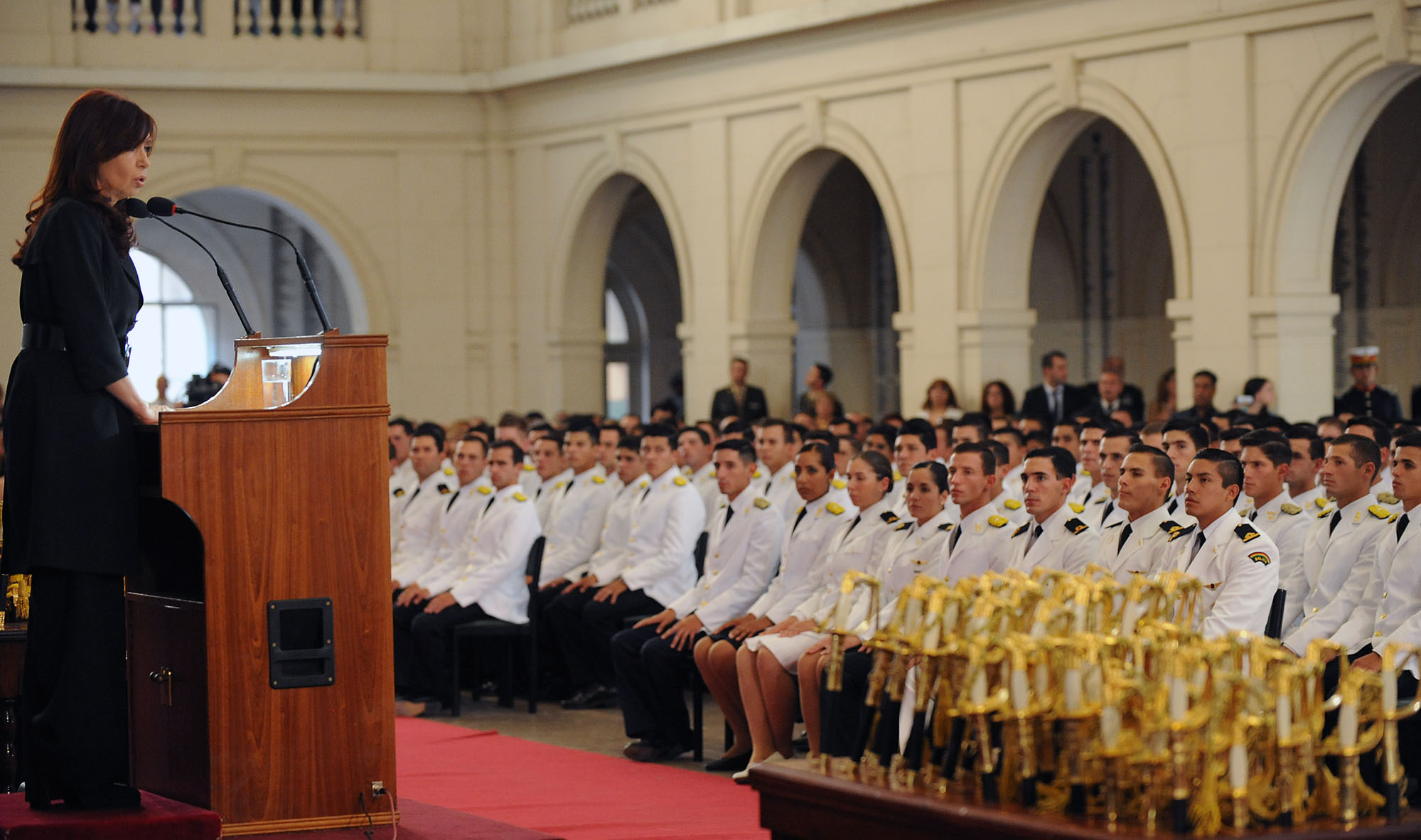
Cristina Fernández de Kirchner addresses the 2010 graduating class of Argentina's National Military College.

Argentine Army:

- Colegio Militar de la Nación (National Military College), in El Palomar, Buenos Aires (northwestern outskirts of Buenos Aires)

Argentine Navy:

- Escuela Naval Militar (Naval Military School), in Río Santiago, Buenos Aires (in Ensenada, near La Plata)

Argentine Air Force:

- Escuela de Aviación Militar (Military Aviation School), in the city of Córdoba

== Armenia ==
- National Defense Research University
- Vazgen Sargsyan Military Academy
- Armenak Khanperyants Military Aviation University

== Australia ==
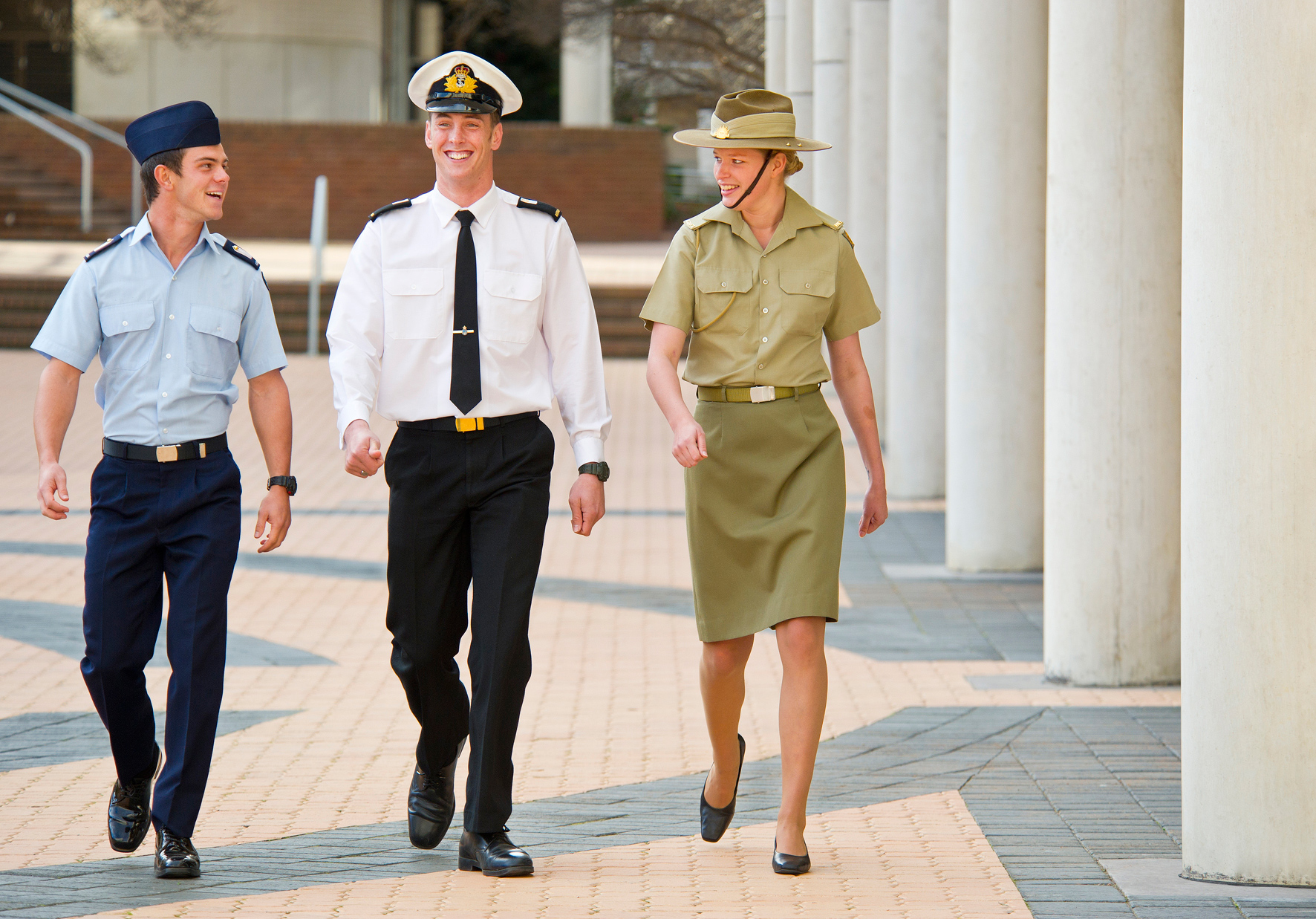
The Australian Defence Force Academy is a tri-service military college established in 1986.

- Australian Defence Force Academy
- Royal Australian Naval College
- Royal Military College, Duntroon
- Officers' Training School RAAF

== Austria ==
- Theresian Military Academy
- Landesverteidigungsakademie

== Azerbaijan ==
- War College of the Azerbaijani Armed Forces
- Azerbaijan Higher Military Academy

== Bangladesh ==
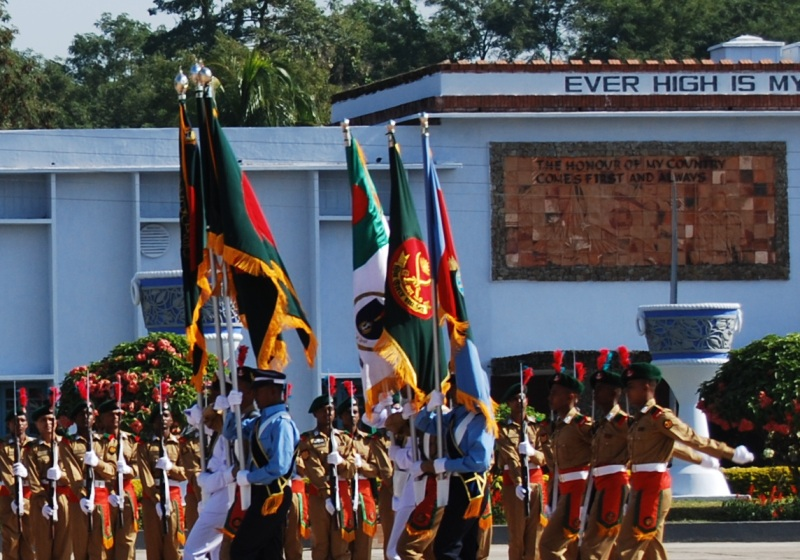
Colours Contingent of the Bangladesh Military Academy, a training institute for officers of the Bangladesh Army

- Bangladesh Military Academy
- Bangladesh Naval Academy
- Bangladesh Air Force Academy
- National Defence College

== Belarus ==
- Military Academy of Belarus
- Border Guard Service Institute of Belarus
- Ministry of the Interior Academy of the Republic of Belarus

== Belgium ==
- Royal Military Academy (Belgium)

== Bolivia ==
- Military College of Bolivia (Colegio Militar del Ejército de Bolivia)
- Bolivian Military Naval Academy
- Bolivian Air Force Academy

== Brazil ==
=== Basic Education ===
(offers an education with military values for civilians students of primary and secondary school)

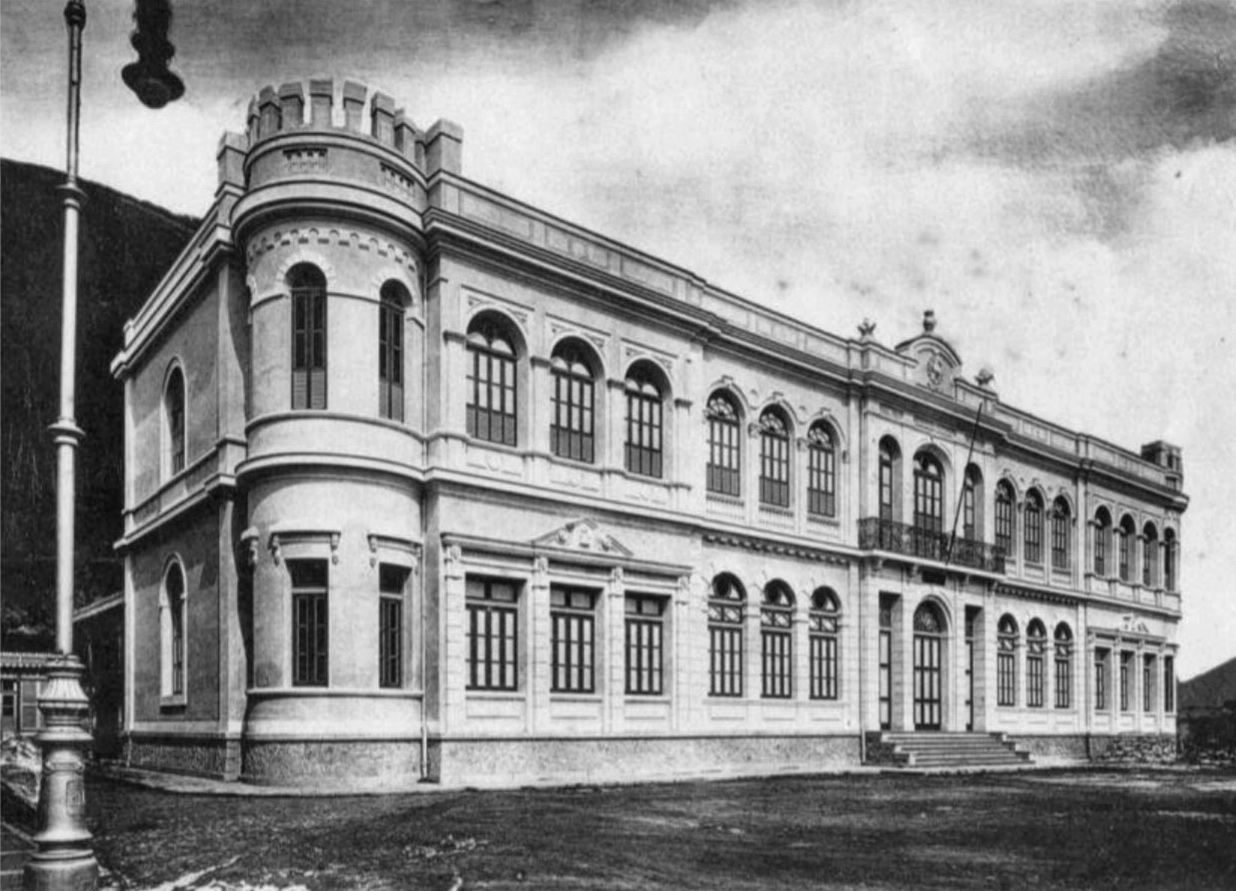
Colégio Militar do Rio de Janeiro

Brazilian Army:

- Colégios Militares do Brasil (SCMB) (Military High School of Brazil System)
  - Colégio Militar de Belém (CMBel) (Military High School of Belém)
  - Colégio Militar de Belo Horizonte (CMBH) (Military High School of Belo Horizonte)
  - Colégio Militar de Brasília (CMB) (Military High School of Brasília)
  - Colégio Militar de Campo Grande (CMCG) (Military High School of Campo Grande)
  - Colégio Militar de Curitiba (CMC) (Military High School of Curitiba)
  - Colégio Militar de Fortaleza (CMF) (Military High School of Fortaleza)
  - Colégio Militar de Juiz de Fora (CMJF) (Military High School of Juiz de Fora)
  - Colégio Militar de Manaus (CMM) (Military High School of Manaus)
  - Colégio Militar de Porto Alegre (CMPA) (Military High School of Porto Alegre)
  - Colégio Militar do Recife (CMR) (Military High School of Recife)
  - Colégio Militar do Rio de Janeiro (CMRJ) (Military High School of Rio de Janeiro)
  - Colégio Militar de Salvador (CMS) (Military High School of Salvador)
  - Colégio Militar de Santa Maria (CMSM) (Military High School of Santa Maria)
  - Colégio Militar de São Paulo (CMSP) (Military High School of São Paulo)

=== Preparatory Schools ===
(prepares students for admission to one of the official training academies)

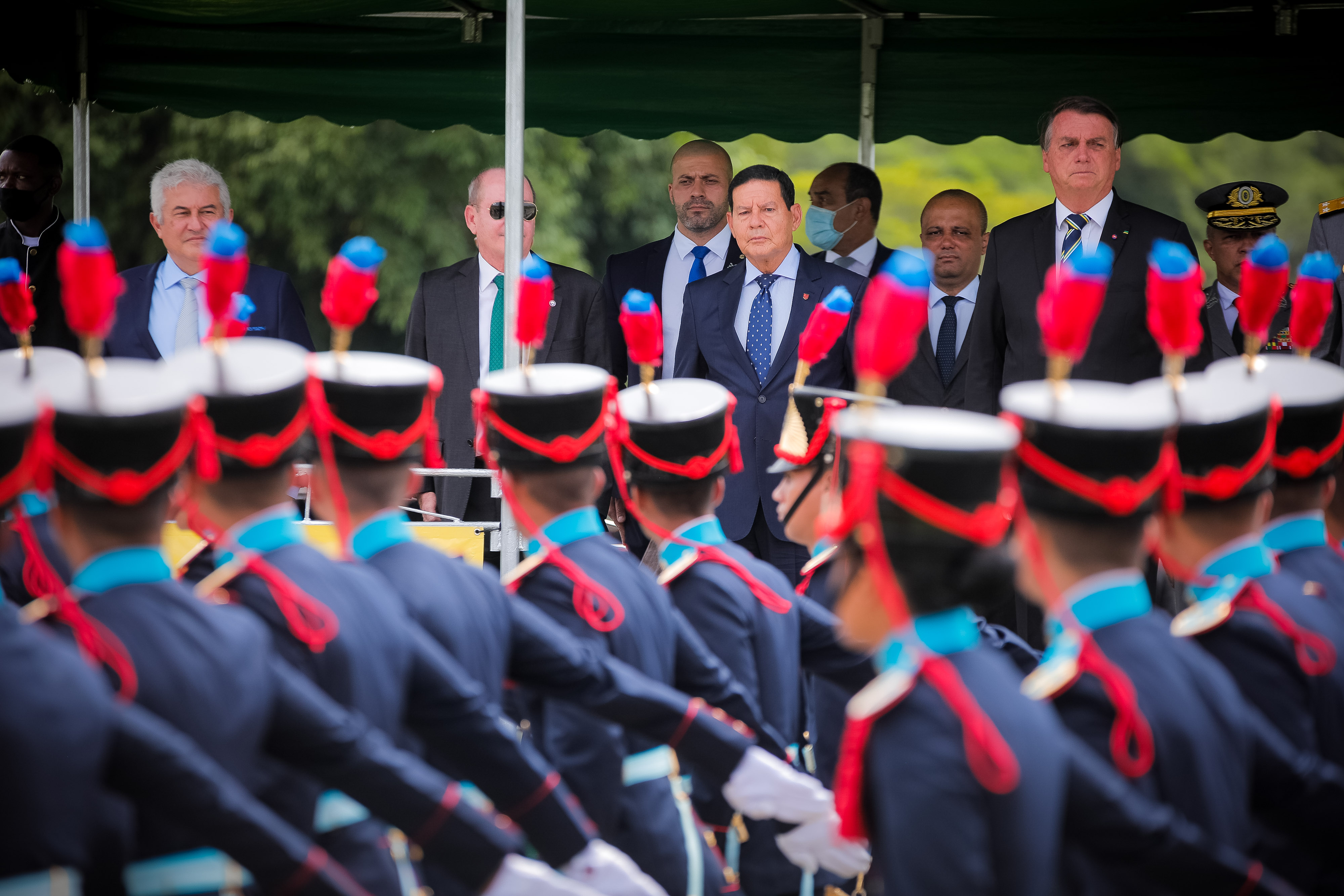
Academia Militar das Agulhas Negras

Brazilian Army:

- Escola Preparatória de Cadetes do Exército (EsPCEx) (Army Cadets Preparatory School)

Brazil's Navy:

- Colégio Naval (CN) (Naval High School)

Brazilian Air Force:

- Escola Preparatória de Cadetes do Ar (EPCAR) (Air Cadets Preparatory School)

=== Sailor and Marine Soldier Training ===
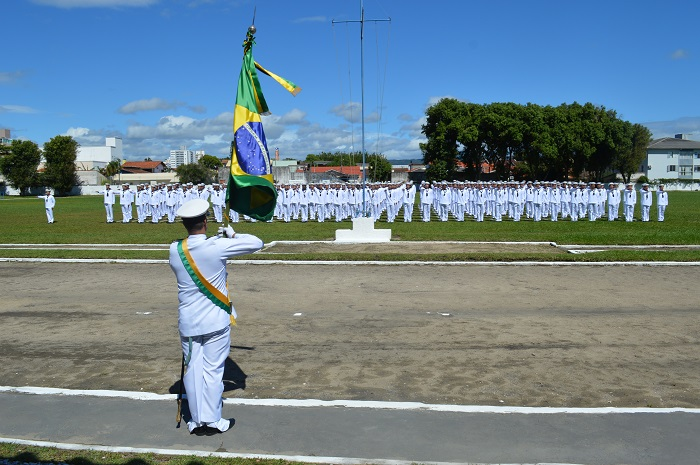
Escola de Aprendizes-Marinheiros de Santa Catarina

Brazil's Navy:

- Centro de Instrução Almirante Milcíades Portela Alves (CIAMPA) (Admiral Milcíades Portela Alves Instruction Center)
- Centro de Instrução e Adestramento de Brasília (CIAB) (Brasília Instruction and Training Center)
- Escola de Aprendizes-Marinheiros (EAM) (Apprentices-Sailors School)
  - Escola de Aprendizes-Marinheiros do Ceará (EAMCE) (Ceará Apprentices-Sailors School)
  - Escola de Aprendizes-Marinheiros do Espírito Santo (EAMES) (Espirito Santo Apprentices-Sailors School)
  - Escola de Aprendizes-Marinheiros de Pernambuco (EAMPE) (Pernambuco Apprentices-Sailors School)
  - Escola de Aprendizes-Marinheiros de Santa Catarina (EAMSC) (Santa Catarina Apprentices-Sailors School)

=== Sergeants Training ===
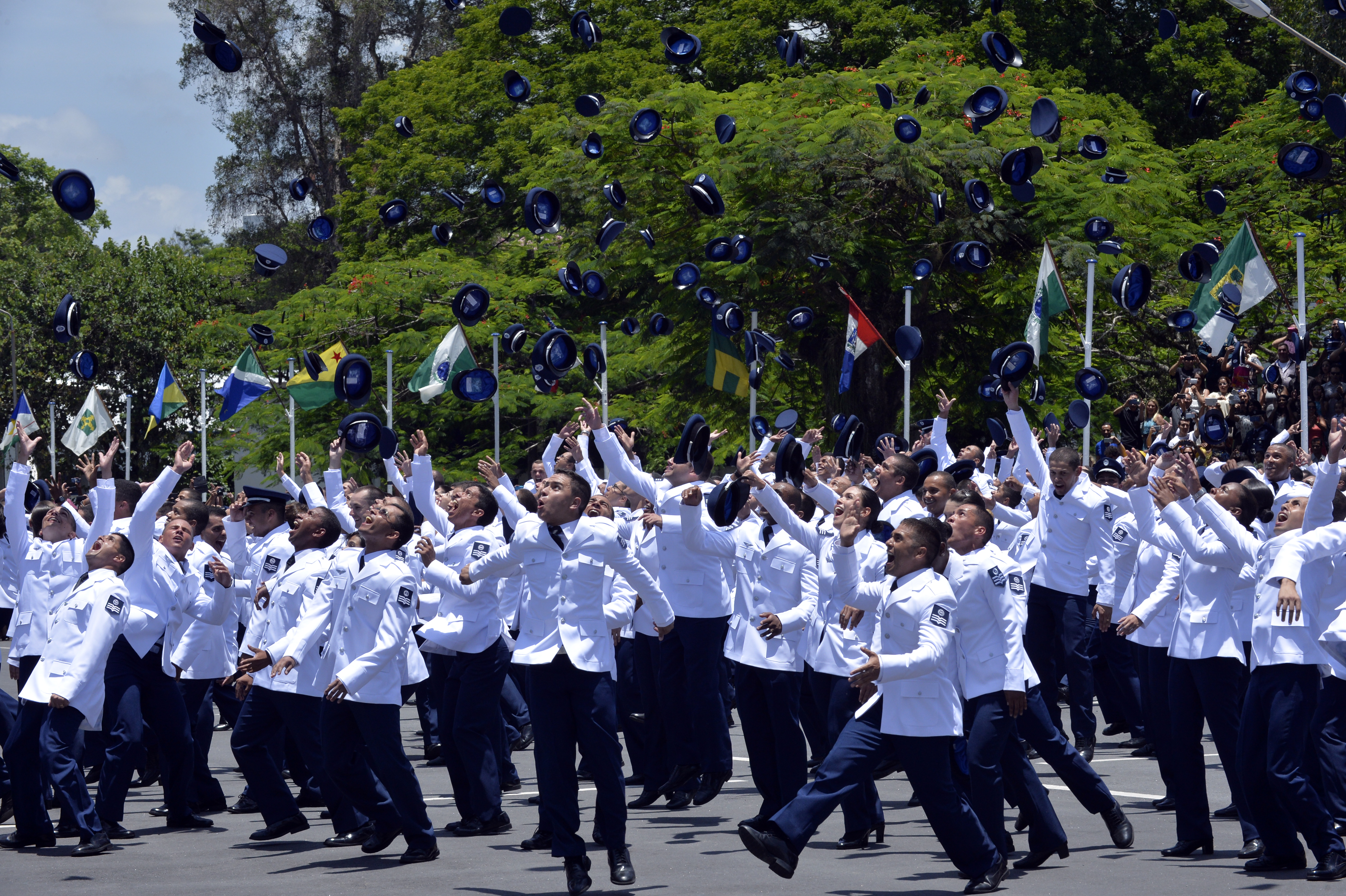
Escola de Especialistas da Aeronáutica

Brazilian Army:

- Escola de Sargentos das Armas (ESA) (Sergeant Weapons School)
- Escola de Sargentos de Logística (EsSLog) (Sergeant of Logistics School)
- Centro de Instrução de Aviação do Exército (CiAvEx) (Army Aviation Instruction Center)

Brazil's Navy:

- Centro de Instrução Almirante Alexandrino (CIAA) (Admiral Alexandrino Instruction Center)
- Centro de Instrução Almirante Sylvio de Camargo (CIASC) (Admiral Sylvio de Camargo Instruction Center)

Brazilian Air Force:

- Escola de Especialistas de Aeronáutica (EEAR) (Air Force Specialists School)

=== Officers Training ===
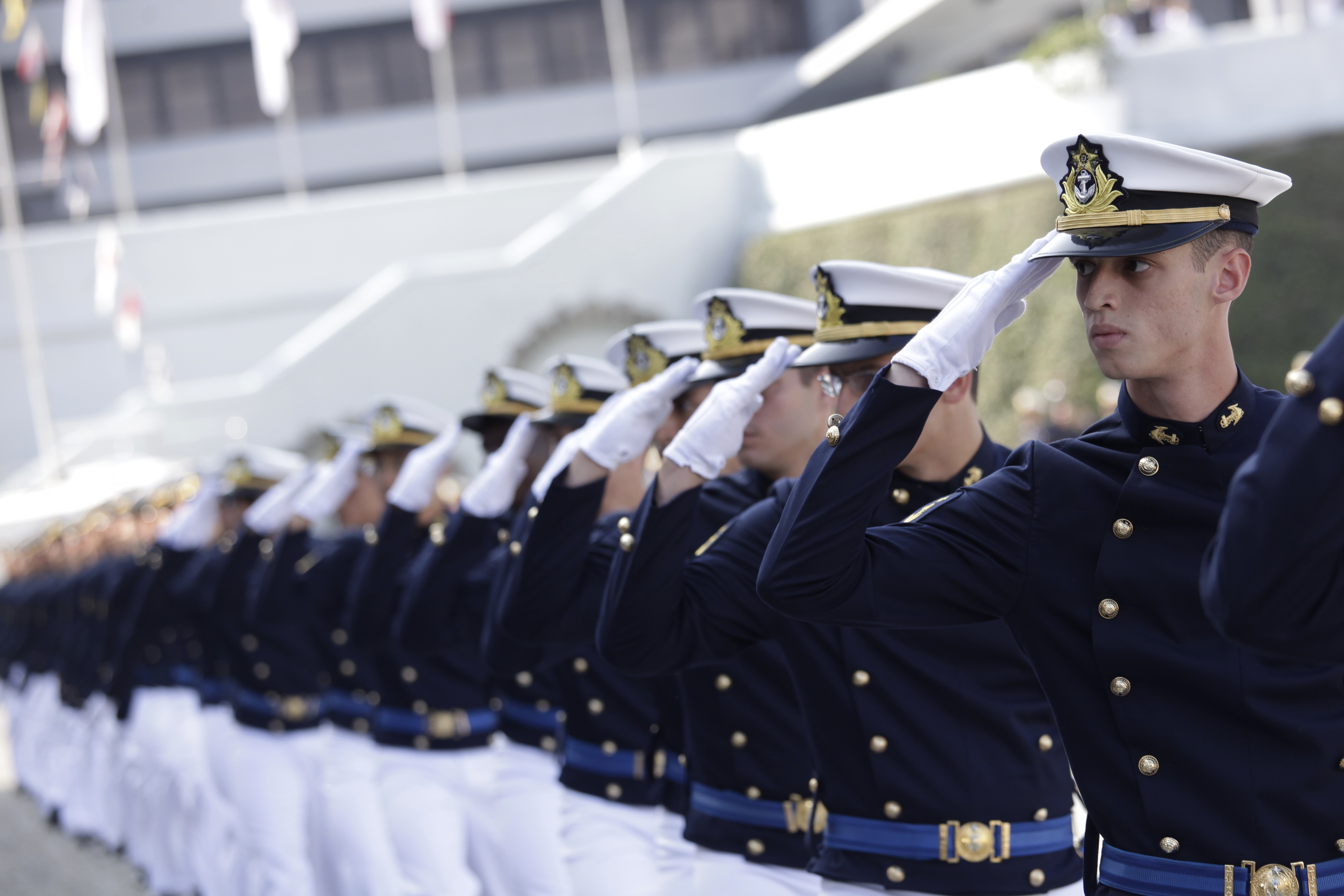
Escola Naval

Brazilian Army:

- Academia Militar das Agulhas Negras (AMAN) (Agulhas Negras Military Academy)
- Escola de Formação Complementar do Exército (EsFCEx) (Army Complementary Training School)
- Escola de Saúde do Exército (EsSEx) (Army Health School)
- Instituto Militar de Engenharia (IME) (Military Institute of Engineering)

Brazil's navy:

- Centro de Instrução Almirante Wandenkolk (CIAW) (Admiral Wandekolk Instruction Center)
- Escola de Formação de Oficiais da Marinha Mercante (EFOMM) (Merchant Navy Officers Training School)
- Escola Naval (Brasil) (EN) (Naval School)

Brazilian Air Force:

- Academia da Força Aérea (Brasil) (AFA) (Air Force Academy)
- Centro de Instrução e Adaptação da Aeronáutica (CIAAR) (Air Force Instruction and Adaptation Center)
- Instituto Tecnológico de Aeronáutica (ITA) (Aeronautics Institute of Technology)

== Bulgaria ==
- Vasil Levski National Military University founded in 1878 as a military school in Plovdiv
  - Air Force Faculty in Dolna Mitropoliya
  - Artillery, Air Defence and CIS Faculty in Shumen
  - All-Force Faculty faculty in Veliko Tarnovo
- Nikola Vaptsarov Naval Academy in Varna and founded in 1881 as Naval Machinery School in Rousse
- Rakovski Defence and Staff College in Sofia, founded with an Act of the 15th National Assembly of March 1, 1912, in Sofia

== Canada ==
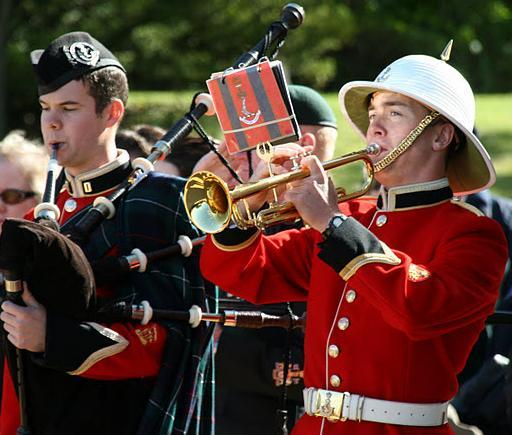
Royal Military College of Canada band piper and bugler. Established in 1876, the College is Canada's only post-secondary military college with degree-granting powers.

Two post-secondary military academies are operated under the Canadian Military Colleges system, the Royal Military College of Canada (RMCC) in Kingston, Ontario; and Royal Military College Saint-Jean (RMC Saint-Jean) in Saint-Jean-sur-Richelieu, Quebec. RMCC was established in 1876, while RMC Saint-Jean was established in 1954. The two institutions provided military education to officer cadets of all three elements in the Canadian Forces; the navy, army and air force; with RMC granted the authority to confer academic degrees in arts, science and engineering by the 1960s. From 1940 to 1995, the Department of National Defence operated a third military college in Victoria, British Columbia, known as Royal Roads Military College (RRMC).

Graduates of the colleges are widely acknowledged to have had a disproportionate impact in the Canadian services and society, thanks to the solid foundations provided by their military education. Military discipline and training, as well as a focus on physical fitness and fluency in both of Canada's two official languages, English and French, provided cadets with ample challenges and a very fulfilling experience. In 1995 the Department of National Defence was forced to close RRMC and RMC Saint-Jean due to budget considerations, but RMCC continues to operate. (In the fall of 1995, the campus reopened as a civilian institution, Royal Roads University.) In 2007, the Department of National Defence reopened RMC Saint-Jean as a military academy that offers equivalent schooling as CEGEP, a level of post-secondary education in Quebec's education system. In 2021 RMC Saint-Jean was returned to university status and had officer cadets graduate and received their commission for the first time since 1995.

In addition to Canadian Military Colleges, the Canadian Armed Forces also operate a number of training centres and schools, including the Canadian Forces College, and the Canadian Forces Language School. The components of the Canadian Armed Forces also maintain training centres and schools. The Canadian Army Doctrine and Training Centre (CADTC) is a formation in the Army that delivers combat, and doctrinal training. The CADTC includes several training establishments, such as the Canadian Manoeuvre Training Centre, Combat Training Centre, Command and Staff College, and the Peace Support Training Centre. The 2 Canadian Air Division is the formation responsible for training in the Royal Canadian Air Force (RCAF), and includes establishments like the Royal Canadian Air Force Academy, 2 Canadian Forces Flying Training School, and 3 Canadian Forces Flying Training School. The RCAF also maintains the Canadian Forces School of Survival and Aeromedical Training.

In addition to publicly operated institutions, Canada is also home to one private military boarding school, Robert Land Academy, in West Lincoln, Ontario. Founded in 1978, it is an all-boys' institute that is fully accredited by Ontario's Ministry of Education. The school offers elementary and secondary levels of education, providing schooling for students from Grade 6 to Grade 12.

== Colombia ==
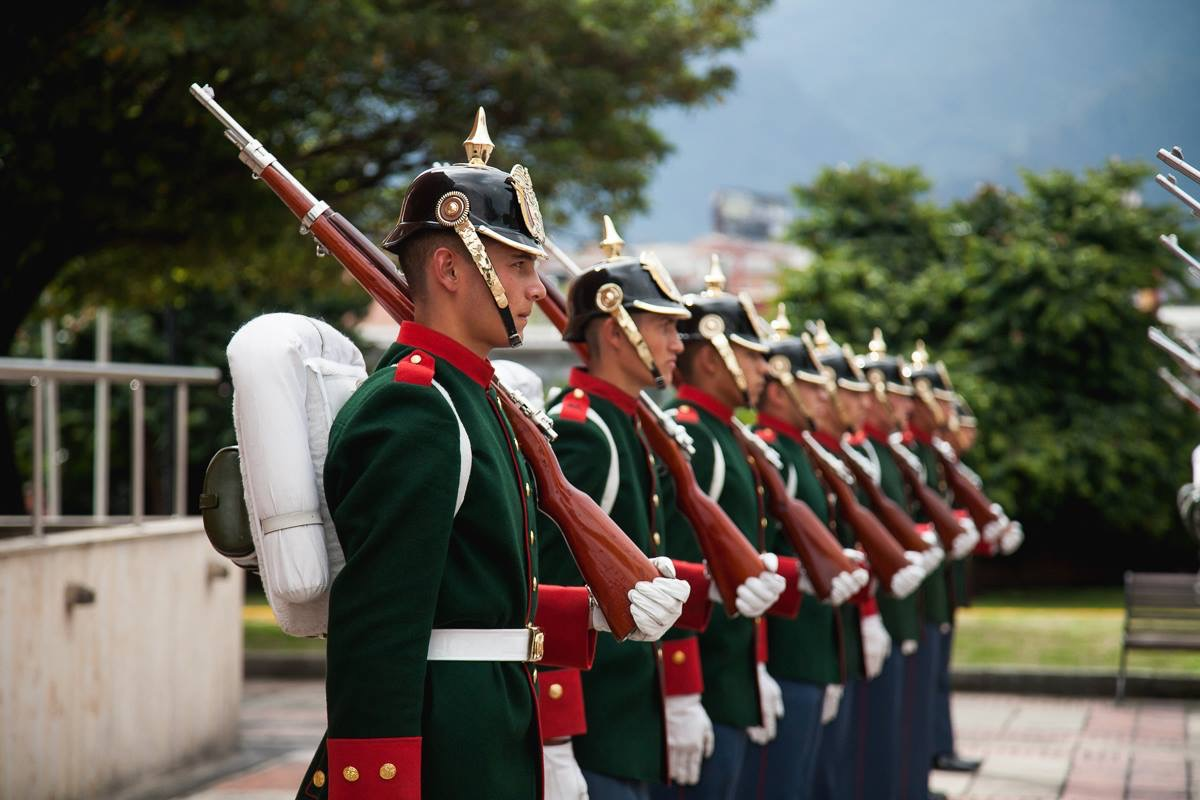
The Honour Guard of José María Córdova Military School. Cadets undergo undergraduate studies at the institution.

National Army of Colombia:

- José María Córdova Military School, in Bogotá.
- Colombian Army NCO School

Colombian Air Force:

- Marco Fidel Suarez Military Aviation School, in Cali.

Colombian Naval Infantry and Colombian Navy:

- Admiral Padilla Naval Academy, in Cartagena de Indias.

National Police of Colombia:

- General Santander National Police Academy, in Bogotá.

== Czech Republic ==
- Univerzita Obrany (University of Defence)
- Military academy and training command

== Democratic People's Republic of Korea ==
- Kim Jong-un National Defense University
- Kim Il-sung Military University
- Kim Il-sung Military Political University
- Kim Jong-suk Naval Academy
- Kim Chaek Air Force Academy

== Denmark ==
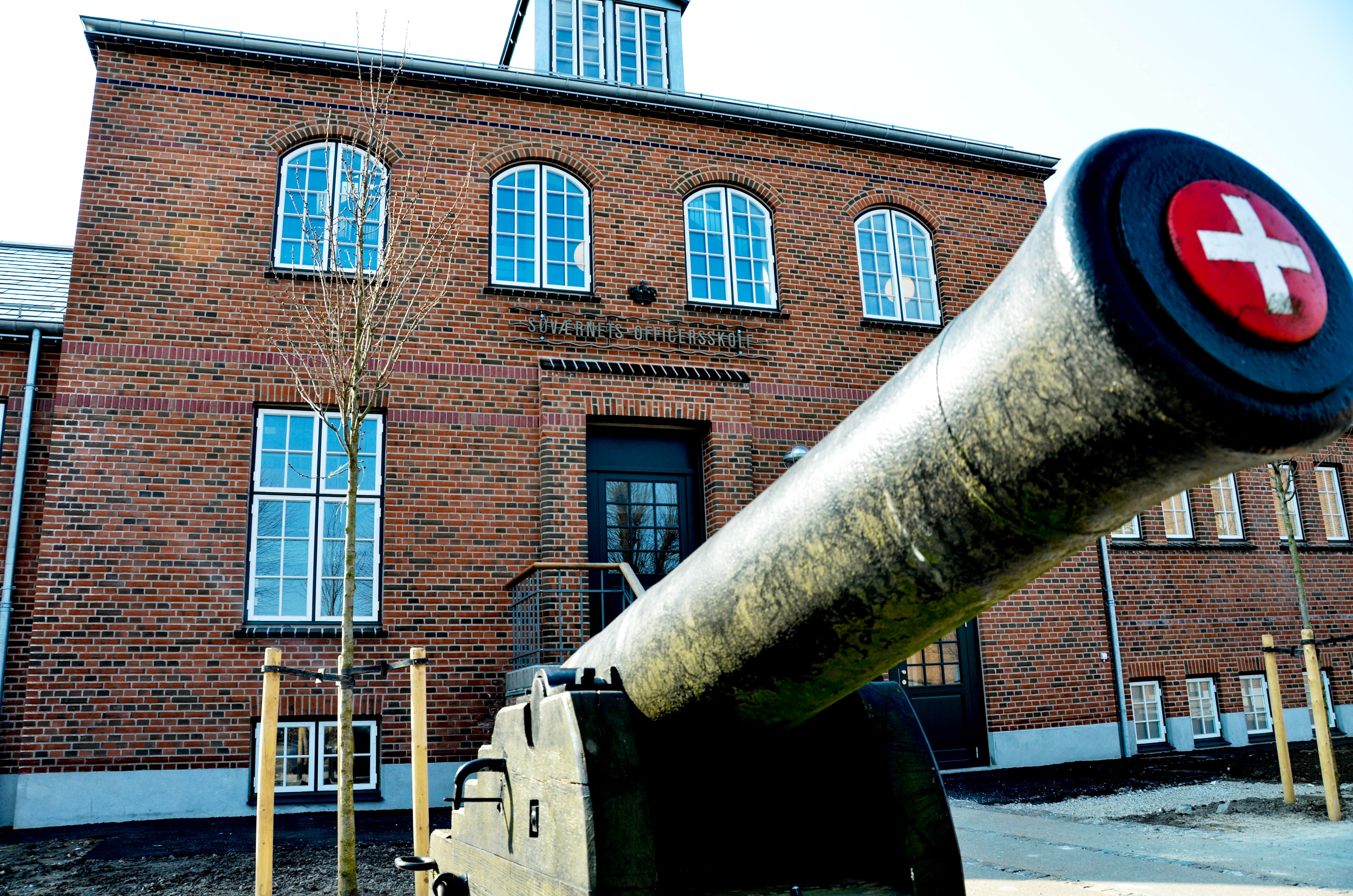
Established in 1701, the Royal Danish Naval Academy is the oldest-still-existing officers' academy in the world.

- Royal Danish Defence College
- Royal Danish Military Academy
- Royal Danish Naval Academy
- Royal Danish Air Force Officers School

== Egypt ==
- Egyptian Military Academy
  - Egyptian Military College
  - Egyptian Air Defense College
  - Egyptian Air College
  - Egyptian Naval College
- Nasser Military Academy
- Egyptian Military Technical College
- Egyptian Military medical college

== El Salvador ==
- Captain General Gerardo Barrios Military School

== Estonia ==
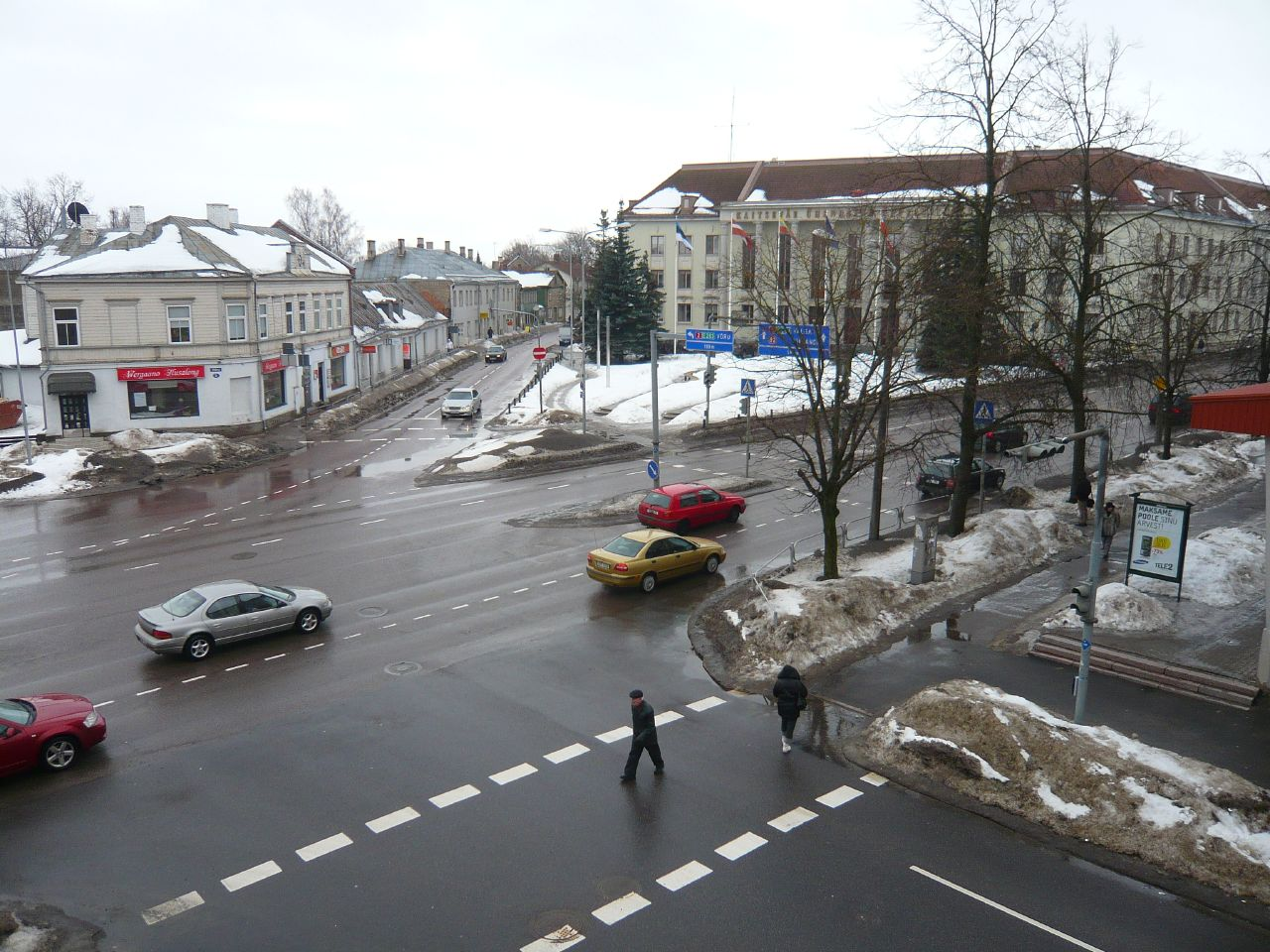
The Baltic Defence College is a multinational military college established by Estonia, Latvia, and Lithuania.

- Estonian Military Academy
- Baltic Defence College, both in Tartu

== Finland ==
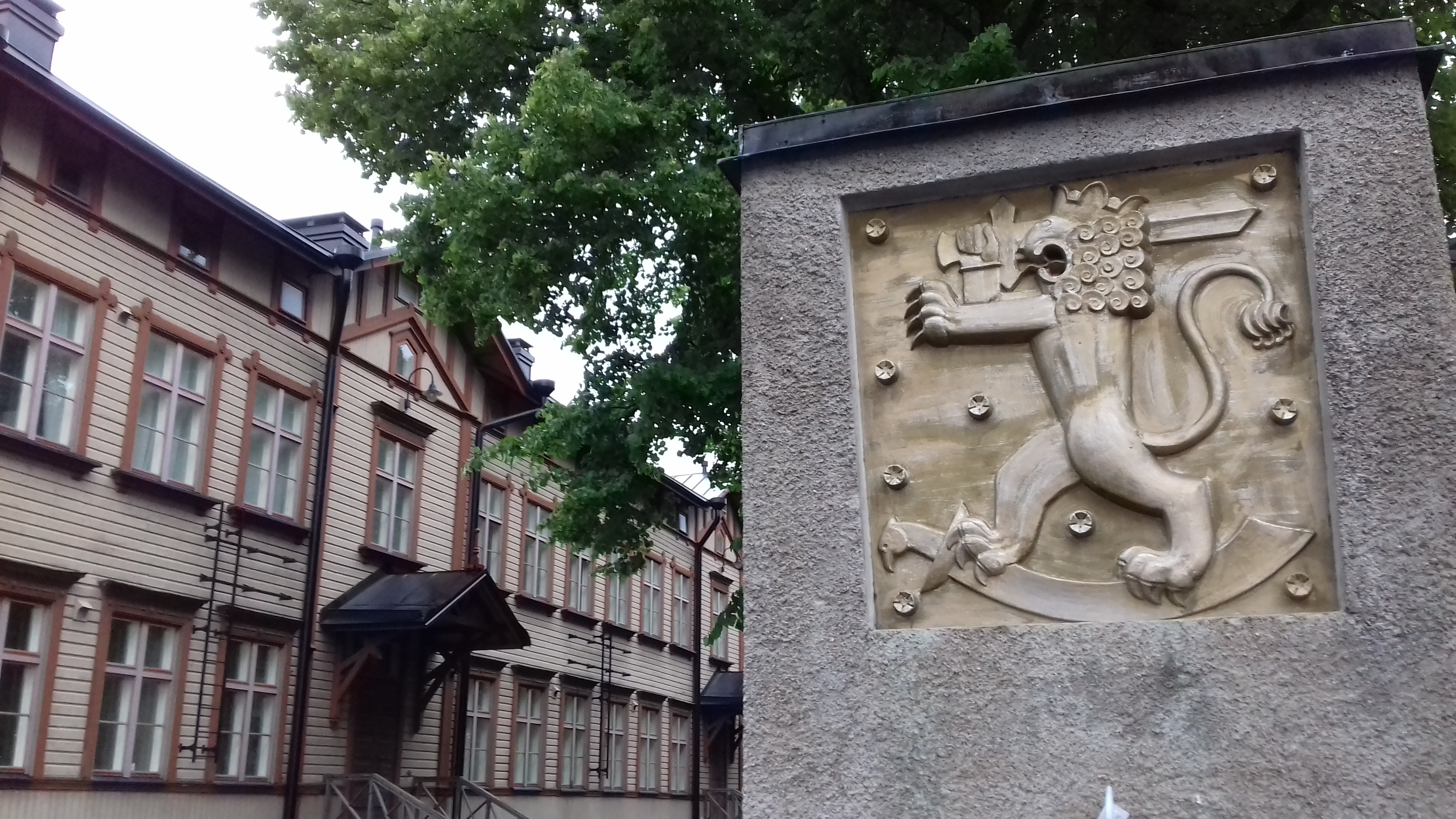
The Rakuunamäki Military Academy in Lappeenranta, Finland

- Finnish National Defence University (Maanpuolustuskorkeakoulu), on Santahamina island, Helsinki

== France ==
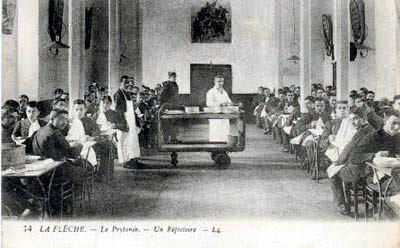
Students of Prytanée National Militaire having lunch, 1900. The institution is one of several military preparatory schools in France.

=== High schools ===
- Lycée militaire de Saint-Cyr
- Lycée militaire d'Autun
- Prytanée National Militaire
- Lycée militaire d'Aix-en-Provence
- Lycée naval de Brest
- École des Pupilles de l'Air

=== Officer academies ===
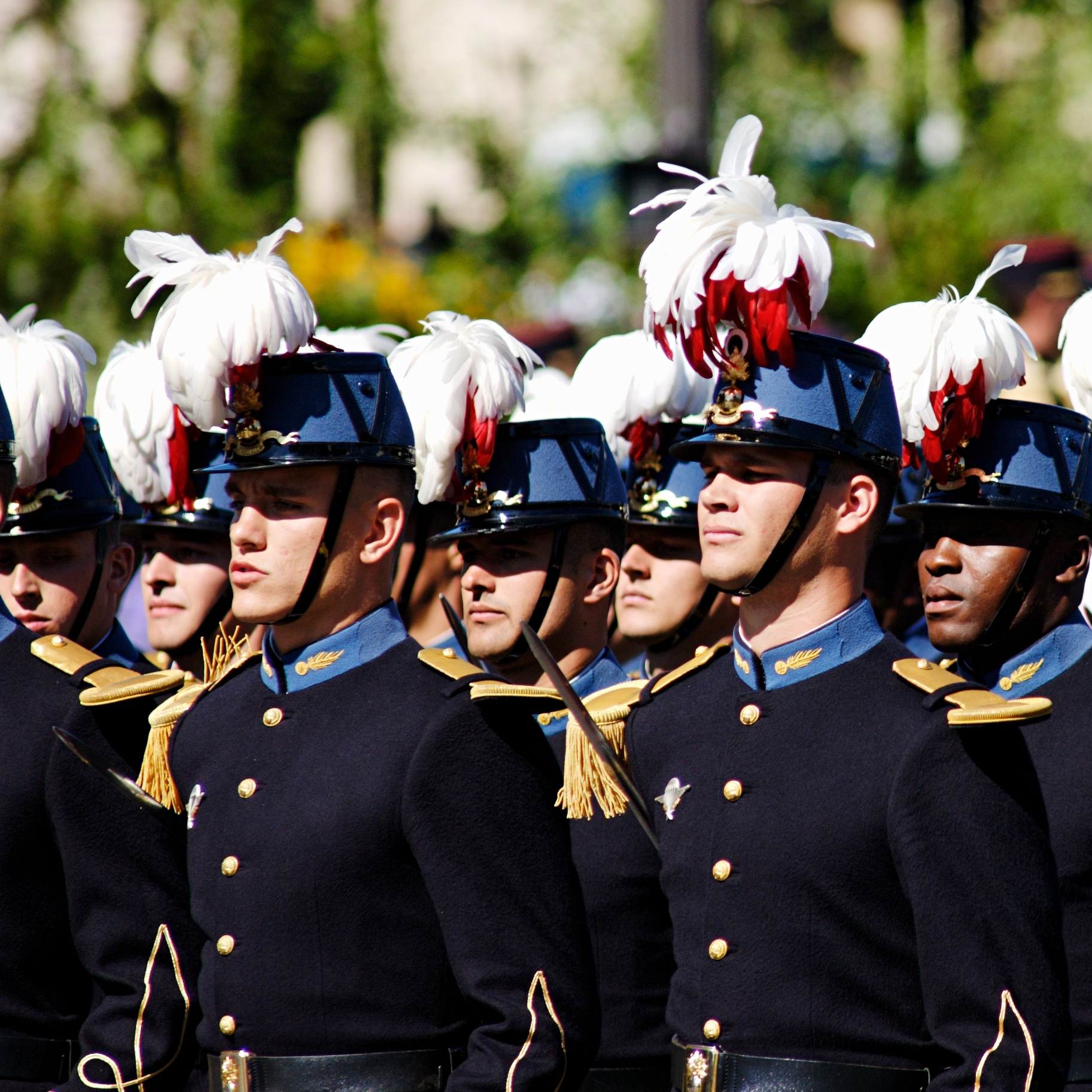
Cadets of École spéciale militaire de Saint-Cyr during the 2008 Bastille Day military parade. The military college was established in 1802 by Napoleon.

- École spéciale militaire de Saint-Cyr (ESM, literally the "Special Military School of St Cyr") is the French Military Academy. It is often referred to as "Saint-Cyr". Founded by Napoleon in 1802, and initially in Fontainebleau, it was moved first to Saint-Cyr-l'École in 1808, and then to Coëtquidan (Brittany) in 1945.
- École militaire interarmes (EMIA)
- École des commissaires des armées (ECA), founded in 2013
- École de l'air: the French Air Force Academy
- École Navale: the French Naval Academy
- École des officiers de la gendarmerie nationale (EOGN): gendarmerie commissioned officers academy
- École Polytechnique (X): a French engineering grande école of military status. Though all of its French engineering students are enlisted and trained as officers, 5% of its graduates remain in the military after graduation.
- ENSTA Bretagne: a French engineering grande école of military status. Only 1/4 of its students are actual officers-in-training.
- École de Santé des Armées: medical school of French army
- National Military Infrastructure Engineers Academy: trains military engineers of the Armed Forces, opened 2013 (also one of the newest)

=== Postgraduate academies ===
- École d'état-major (Staff school): first step of higher military studies, for officer of OF-2 rank.
- École de Guerre (War School): second step of higher military studies, mainly for ranks OF-2 and OF-3 who want to continue the command track (e.g. to command battalion or regiment).
- Collège d'enseignement supérieur de l'armée de terre (Army Higher Education College): second step of military education, but for officers wishing to achieve a high-level specialization.
  - Cours supérieur d'état-major (Advanced Staff Course)
  - Enseignement militaire supérieur scientifique et technique (Higher Technical and Scientific Education).
- Centre des hautes études militaire (Center for Advanced Military Studies): final step of military education, for very few selected OF-5. Its students also attend the civilian institut des hautes études de défense nationale.

== Georgia ==
- National Defense Academy
- Cadet Bachelor School
- Junior Officer Basic School
- Aviation Air Defense Officer Basic School
- Medical Officer School
- Captain Career School
- Command and General Staff School
- School of Advance Defense Studies
- Language Training School

== Germany ==
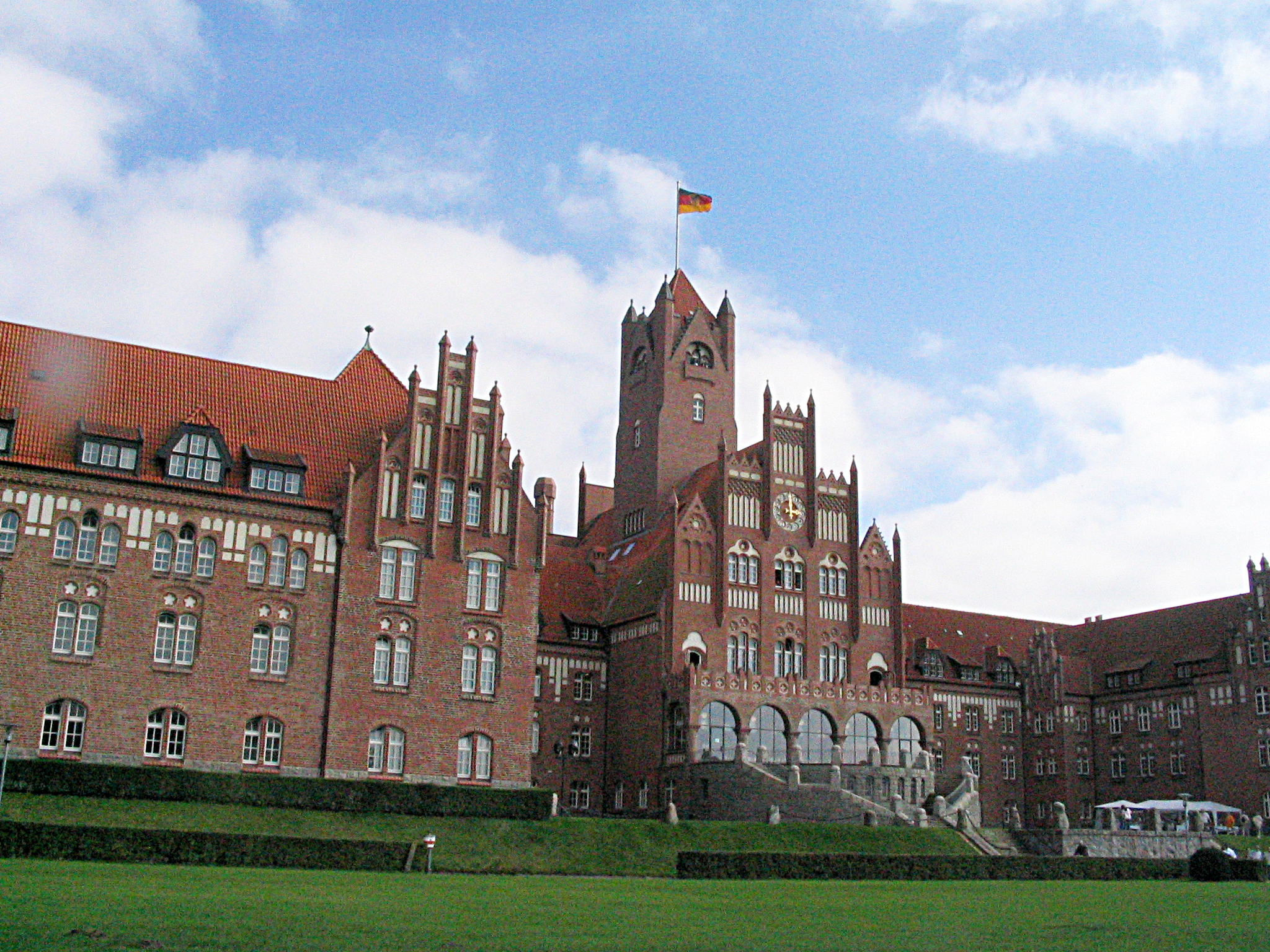
The main complex of the Naval Academy Mürwik of the German Navy

Library of the University of the Bundeswehr Munich, which provides post-secondary education to military personnel and civilians

The standard education in military leadership is the task of the Offizierschulen (officers' schools) run by the three branches. The contents differ from branch to branch. According to the doctrine "leading by task", in the army all prospective platoon leaders are trained down to the level of a commander of a mixed combat battalion. There they also have to pass an officer exam to become commissioned later on.

Moreover, there exist so called Waffenschulen (schools of weapons) like infantry school or artillery school. There the officers learn to deal with the typical tasks of their respective corps.

A specialty of the German concept of officer formation is the academic education. Germany runs two Universities of the German Federal Armed Forces where almost every future officer has to pass non-military studies and achieve a bachelor's or master's degree. During their studies (after at least three years of service) the candidates become commissioned Leutnant (second lieutenant).

The three officer's schools are:

- The German Navy supervises:
  - Naval Academy at Mürwik, in Flensburg-Mürwik
- The German Army supervises:
  - Offizierschule des Heeres, in Dresden
- The German Air Force supervises:
  - Offizierschule der Luftwaffe, in Fürstenfeldbruck

Academic and staff education:

- Universities of the German Federal Armed Forces
  - Helmut Schmidt University, in Hamburg
  - University of the Bundeswehr Munich, in Munich
- Führungsakademie der Bundeswehr, in Hamburg

== Greece ==
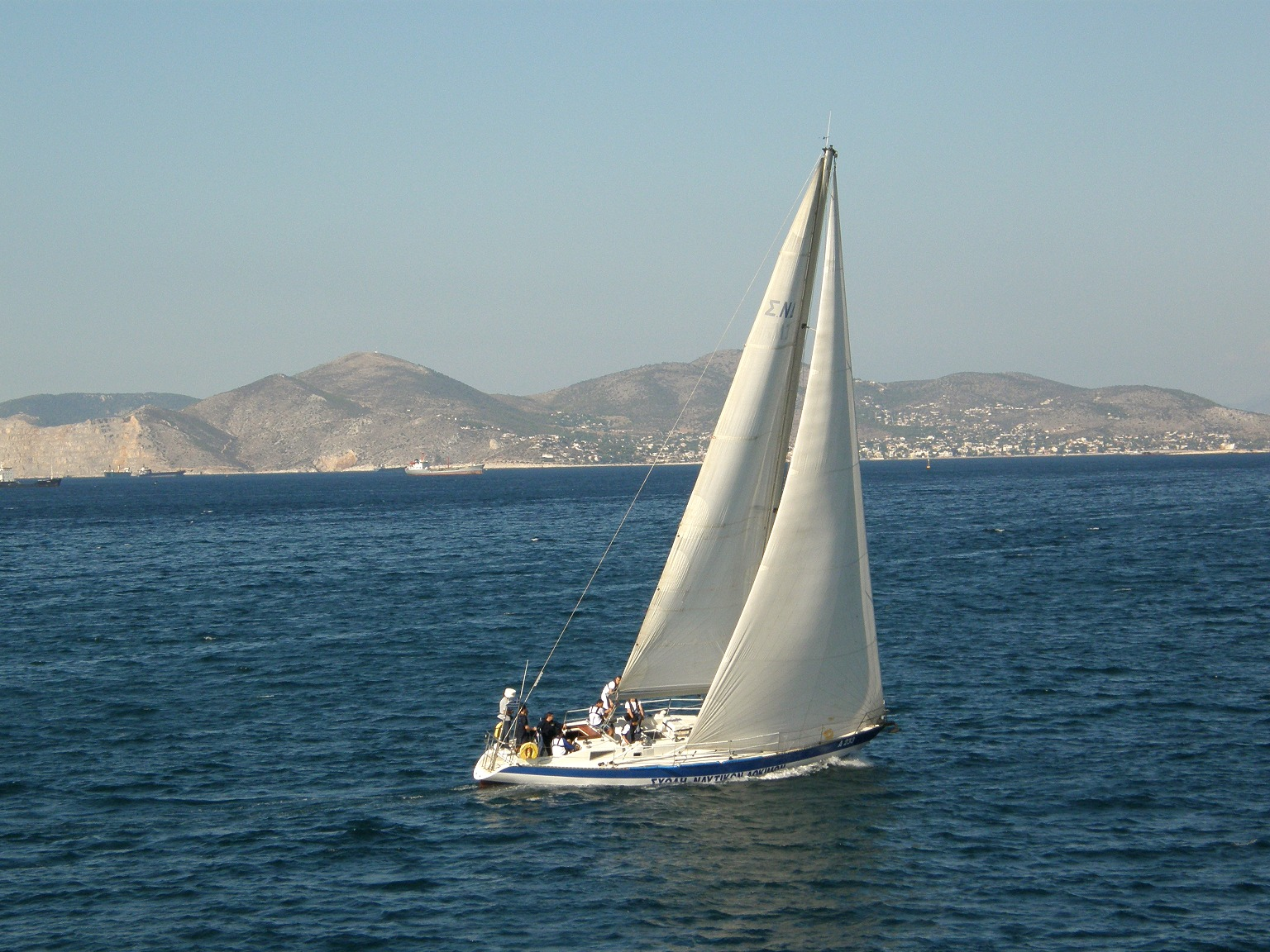
A sloop of the Hellenic Naval Academy sails past with a crew of naval cadet officers. The Academy is supervised by the Hellenic Navy.

The Hellenic Armed Forces have military academies supervised by each branch of the Armed Forces individually:

Highest Military Academies (ΑΣΣ) or Higher Military Educational Institutions (ΑΣΕΙ):

- The Hellenic Army supervises:
  - The Evelpidon Military Academy, in Athens.
  - The Corps Officers Military Academy, in Thessaloniki.
  - The Nursery Officers Academy, in Athens.
- The Hellenic Air Force supervises:
  - The Icarus Air Force Academy, in Tatoi (Athens).
- The Hellenic Navy supervises:
  - The Hellenic Naval Cadets Academy, in Piraeus.

Higher Military NCO Academies (ΑΣΣΥ):

- The Hellenic Army supervises the Military Non-commissioned Officers' Academy (ΣΜΥ).
- The Hellenic Air Force supervises the Air Force Non-commissioned Officers' Academy (ΣΜΥΑ).
- The Hellenic Navy supervises the Naval Non-commissioned Officers' Academy (ΣΜΥΝ).

Despite their names (Greek: Σχολές Υπαξιωματικών, lit. 'Sub-officers' Academies'), their alumni can advance to the rank of Antisyntagmatarchis/Antipterachos/Antiploiarchos.

== Hungary ==
- National University of Public Service
  - Faculty of Military Sciences and Officer Training

== India ==
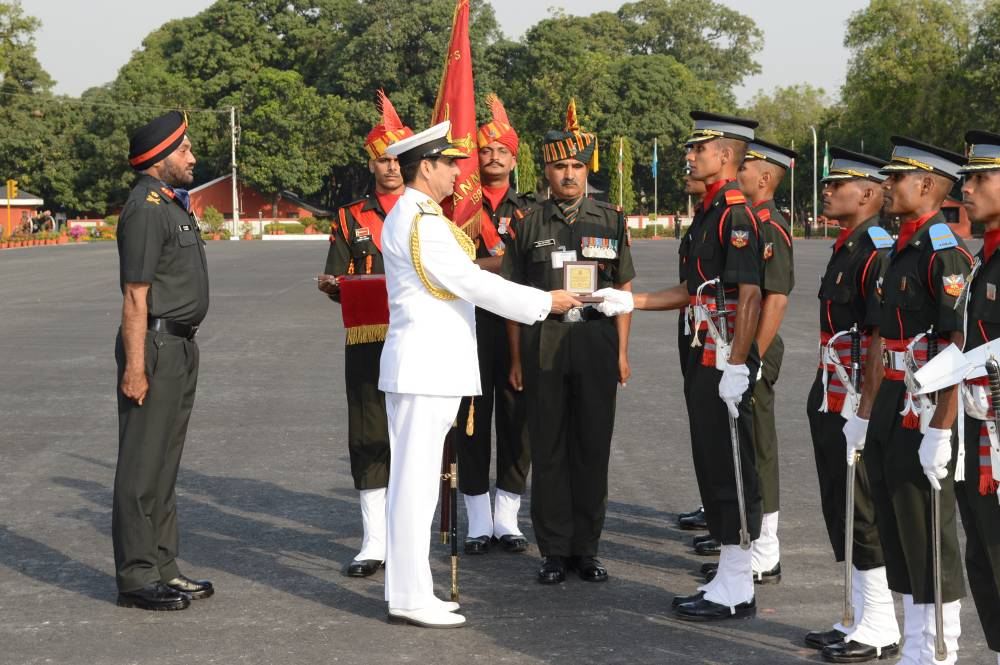
Robin K. Dhowan, Chief of Naval Staff for India, reviews cadets during a passing out parade of the Indian Military Academy. The institution is a training academy of the Indian Army.

== Indonesia ==
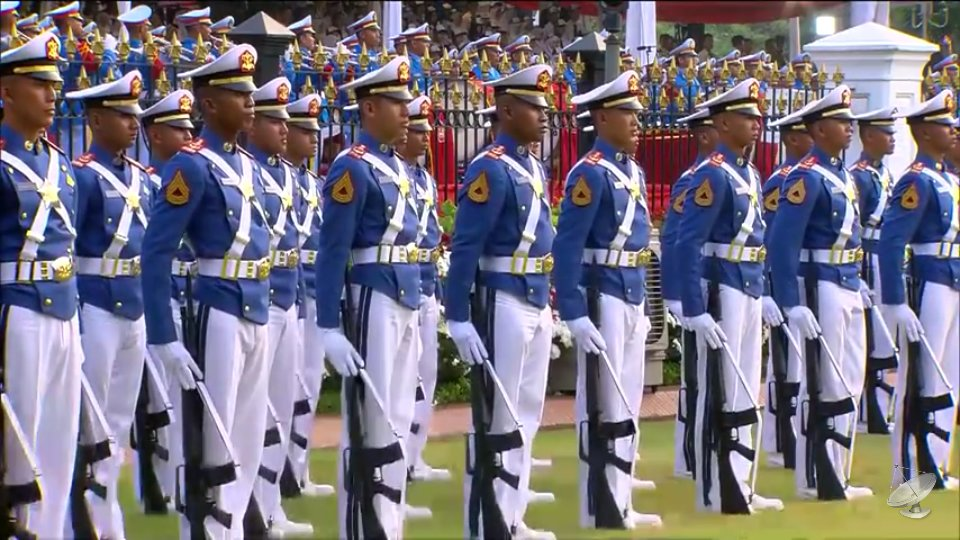
Cadets of the Indonesian Military Academy in parade uniform during the Indonesian independence day ceremony. The institution is the military academy of the Indonesian Army.

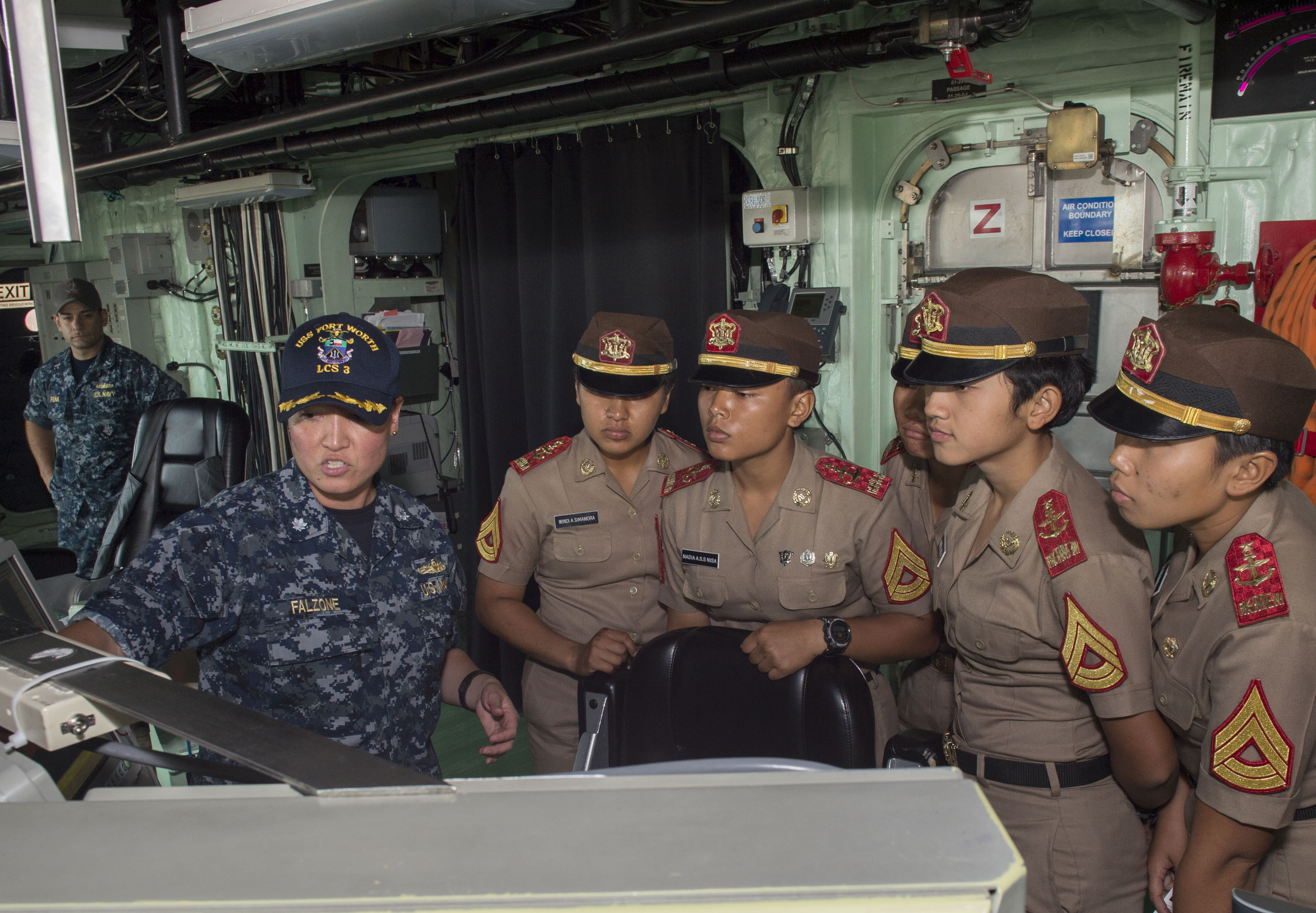
Cadets from the Indonesian Naval Academy tour the USS Fort Worth on CARAT Indonesia 2015. The Indonesian Naval Academy is part of the Indonesian Navy.

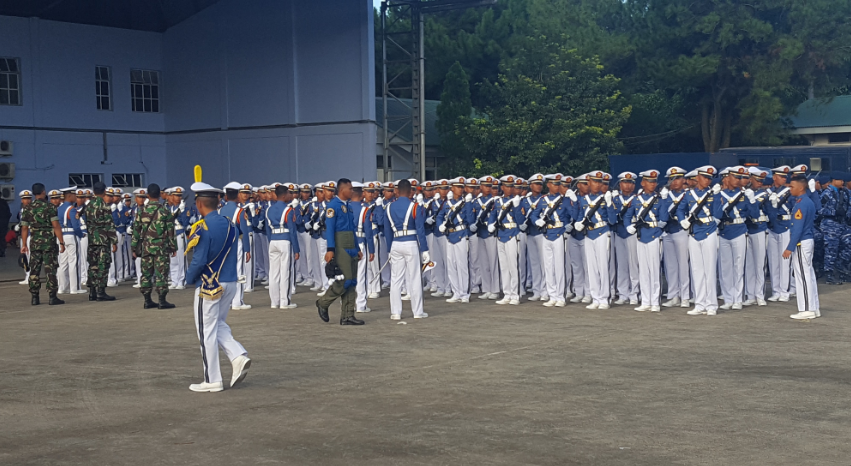
Cadets of the Indonesian Air Force Academy in formation before parading for the Air force anniversary ceremony. The Academy is operated by the Indonesian Air Force.

The Indonesian Military Academy was founded in Yogyakarta, October 13, 1945, by the order of General Staff Chief of Indonesia Army Lieutenant General Urip Sumohardjo as the Militaire Academie (MA) Yogyakarta.

Currently, the Tentara Nasional Indonesia or the TNI (Indonesian National Armed Forces), under the supervision of the Commanding General of the Indonesian National Armed Forces Academy System (a two or three-star officer in billet) in the HQ of the Indonesian National Armed Forces, has divided the academies into the three respective services:

- Indonesian Military Academy (Akademi Militer; Akmil), in Magelang, Central Java, is under the supervision of the Chief of Staff of the Indonesian Army, operated since 1946.
- Indonesian Naval Academy (Akademi Angkatan Laut; AAL), in Surabaya, East Java, is under the supervision of the Chief of Staff of the Indonesian Navy. The Indonesian Naval Academy also educates and forms officers to serve in the Indonesian Marine Corps. In existence since 1951.
- Indonesian Air Force Academy (Akademi Angkatan Udara; AAU), in Yogyakarta, is under the supervision of the Chief of Staff of the Indonesian Air Force. The academy has three majorings which are: electronics, engineering, and administration. Following graduation, students who are selected as Pilot and Navigator conduct further training in the Pilot and Navigator Flight School prior bearing the Pilot/Navigator designation. Active since 1945 (with its current form since 1965), but also inherits the traditions of former Dutch military aviation schools.

Each service academy is headed by a two-star general who serves as superintendent, and his/her deputy is a one-star officer. All the students (cadets/midshipman) are recruited from senior high school graduates from all over Indonesia. Shortly after graduation, they are commissioned as Letnan Dua (Second Lieutenant/Ensign) in their respective service branches and receive a bachelor's degree comparable to those awarded by civil academies or universities. The length term is now 4 years and is divided into five grades of cadets' ranks, starting from the lowest:

- Prajurit Taruna (Cadet Private), 1st year (4 months)
- Kopral Taruna (Cadet Corporal), 1st year (8 months)
- Sersan Taruna (Cadet Sergeant), 2nd year
- Sersan Mayor Dua Taruna (Cadet Second Sergeant Major), 3rd year
- Sersan Mayor Satu Taruna (Cadet First Sergeant Major), 4th year

Taruna is also a nickname to cadets in the Military, Naval, and Air Force Academies, however other nicknames such as Kadet refers to cadets in the Naval Academy, while Karbol refers to cadets in the Air Force Academy. The term "Taruna" however still applies to all cadets from the three academies.

Until 1999, before the Indonesian National Police officially separated from the armed forces, the Indonesian Police Academy ("AKPOL") also stood under the National Armed Forces Academy but now has separated from the Military and is under the auspices of the President of Indonesia controlled by the National Police Headquarters (Mabes Polri), where in the other hand the Armed Forces (Army, Naval, and Air Force) Academies of Indonesia is under the auspices of the Ministry of Defense controlled by the Armed Forces General Headquarters (Mabes TNI). Presently, the Police Academy is in Semarang (Central Java), and is supervised under the supervision of the Chief of the Indonesian National Police (Kapolri).

All three academies and the Police Academy have a joint 4th class cadet training program since 2008, after completing it the cadets go to their respective academies to continue with the three remaining years of study before commissioning.

== Iran ==
Iran has five main military universities:

- Imam Ali Officers' University (Persian: دانشگاه افسری امام علی; acronym: دا اف, DĀʿAF), formerly known as Officers' School (Persian: دانشکده افسری) is the military academy of Ground Forces of Islamic Republic of Iran Army, in Tehran, Iran.
- Shahid Sattari Aeronautical University (Persian: دانشگاه علوم و فنون هوایی شهید ستاری) is the military academy of Islamic Republic of Iran Air Force, in Tehran, Iran.
- Imam Khomeini Naval University of Noshahr (Persian: دانشگاه علوم و فنون دریایی امام خمینی) is the military academy of Islamic Republic of Iran Navy, in Noshahr, Mazandaran, Iran.
- Khatam al-Anbia Air Defense Academy (Persian: دانشگاه پدافند هوایی خاتم‌الانبیاء آجا) is the military academy of Islamic Republic of Iran Air Defense Force, in Tehran, Iran.
- Imam Hossein University (Persian: دانشگاه امام حسین; acronym: IHU) is the military academy of the Islamic Revolutionary Guard Corps, in Tehran, Iran.
- Amir Al-Momenin University of Military Sciences and Technology

== Iraq ==
- Iraqi Military Academy Rustamiyah

=== Kurdistan Region ===
- Zakho Military College (Kurdish: کۆلێژی سەربازی زاخۆ, romanized: Kolejî Serbazî Zaxo)
- Qalachwalan Military College

== Israel ==
- Bahad 1
- Command and Staff College
- Israeli Naval Academy
- Israeli Air Force Flight Academy
- National Security College
- IDF Military Colleges
- Tactical Command College

== Italy ==
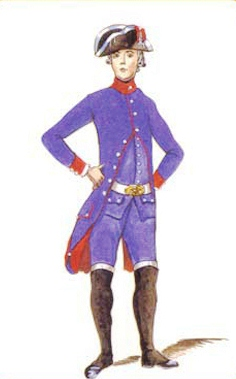
A cadet of Italy's Nunziatella military academy in 1787, the year the academy was established

High school level institutions (only for classical and scientific liceum, starting from grade 10):

- Scuola Militare Nunziatella, founded during the Bourbon Period in 1787, in Italian Army, Naples
- Scuola Militare Teulié, founded during the Napoleonic period in 1802, Italian Army, Milan
- Scuola Militare Navale Morosini, Italian Navy, Venice
- Scuola Militare Aeronautica Douhet, Italian Air Force, Florence

2009–2010 school year was the first school year with girls attending.

Non Commissioned Officer (NCO) schools:

- Army: Scuola sottufficiali dell'Esercito Italiano, Viterbo
- Navy: Scuola sottufficiali della Marina Militare, Taranto and Law Maddalena
- Air Force: Scuola marescialli dell'Aeronautica Militare, Viterbo
- Carabinieri: Scuola marescialli e brigadieri dei carabinieri, Firenze
- Guardia di Finanza: Scuola ispettori e sovrintendenti della Guardia di Finanza, L'Aquila

University level institutions:

- Military Academy of Modena
- Scuola di Applicazione, Turin
- Accademia Navale, Livorno
- Accademia Aeronautica, Pozzuoli
- Scuola Ufficiali Carabinieri, Rome
- Accademia della Guardia di Finanza, Bergamo

== Japan ==
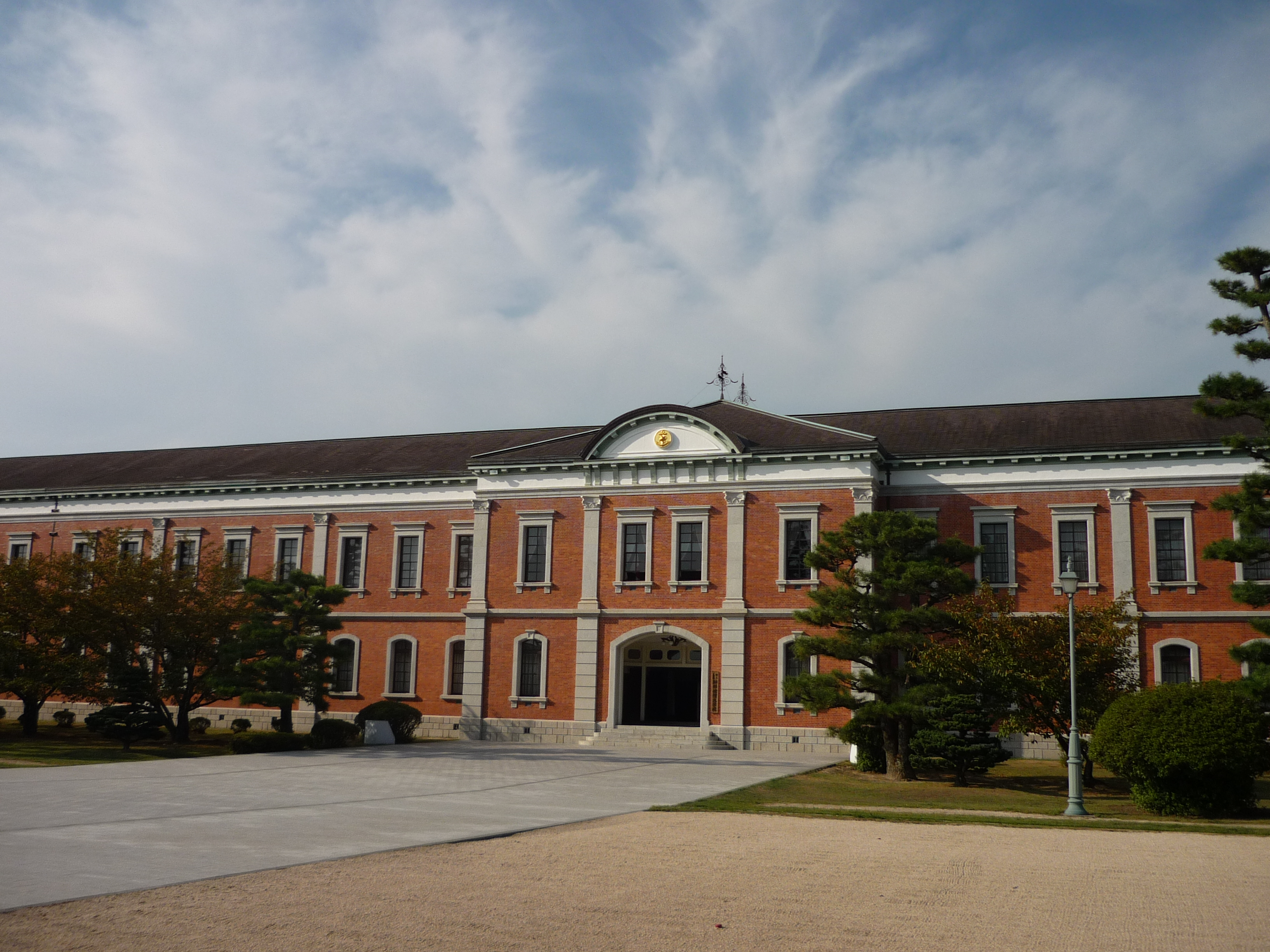
JMSDF Officer Candidate School, Etajima, Hiroshima

=== Universities ===
- National Defense Academy of Japan
- National Defense Medical College
- Japan Coast Guard Academy

=== Officer Candidate Schools ===
- JGSDF Officer Candidate School, Kurume
- JMSDF Officer Candidate School, Etajima (Naval Academy Etajima)
- JASDF Officer Candidate School, Nara

=== Officer Colleges ===
- Joint Staff College
- JGSDF Training Evaluation Research and Development Command
- JMSDF Staff College
- JASDF Staff College

== Kazakhstan ==
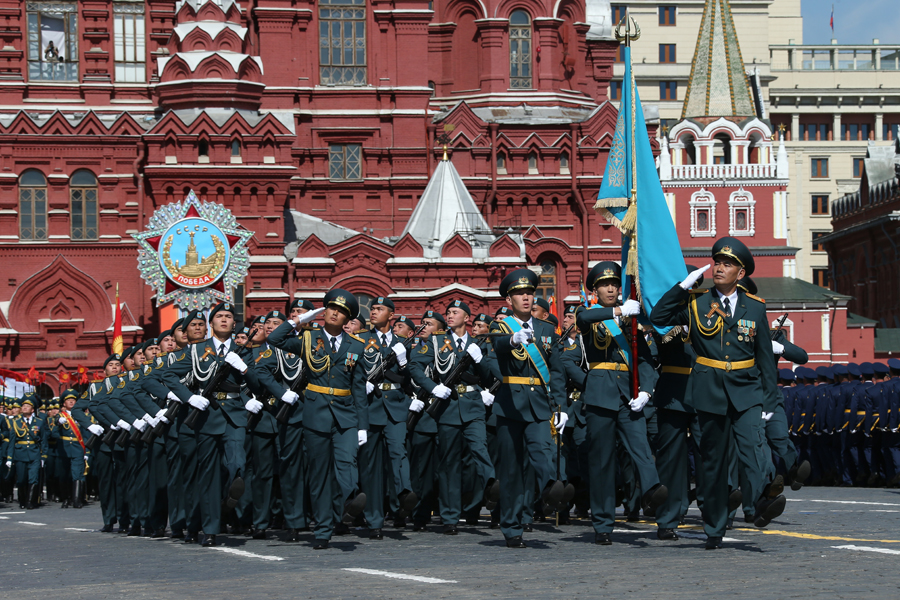
Cadets of the Military Institute of the Kazakh Ground Forces march in the 2015 Moscow Victory Day Parade.

- National Defense University
- Military Institute of the Kazakh Ground Forces
- Talgat Bigeldinov Military Institute of the Air Defence Forces
- Military Engineering Institute of Radio Electronics and Communications

== Kyrgyzstan ==
- Military Institute of the Armed Forces of the Kyrgyz Republic

== Latvia ==
- National Defence Academy of Latvia

== Malaysia ==
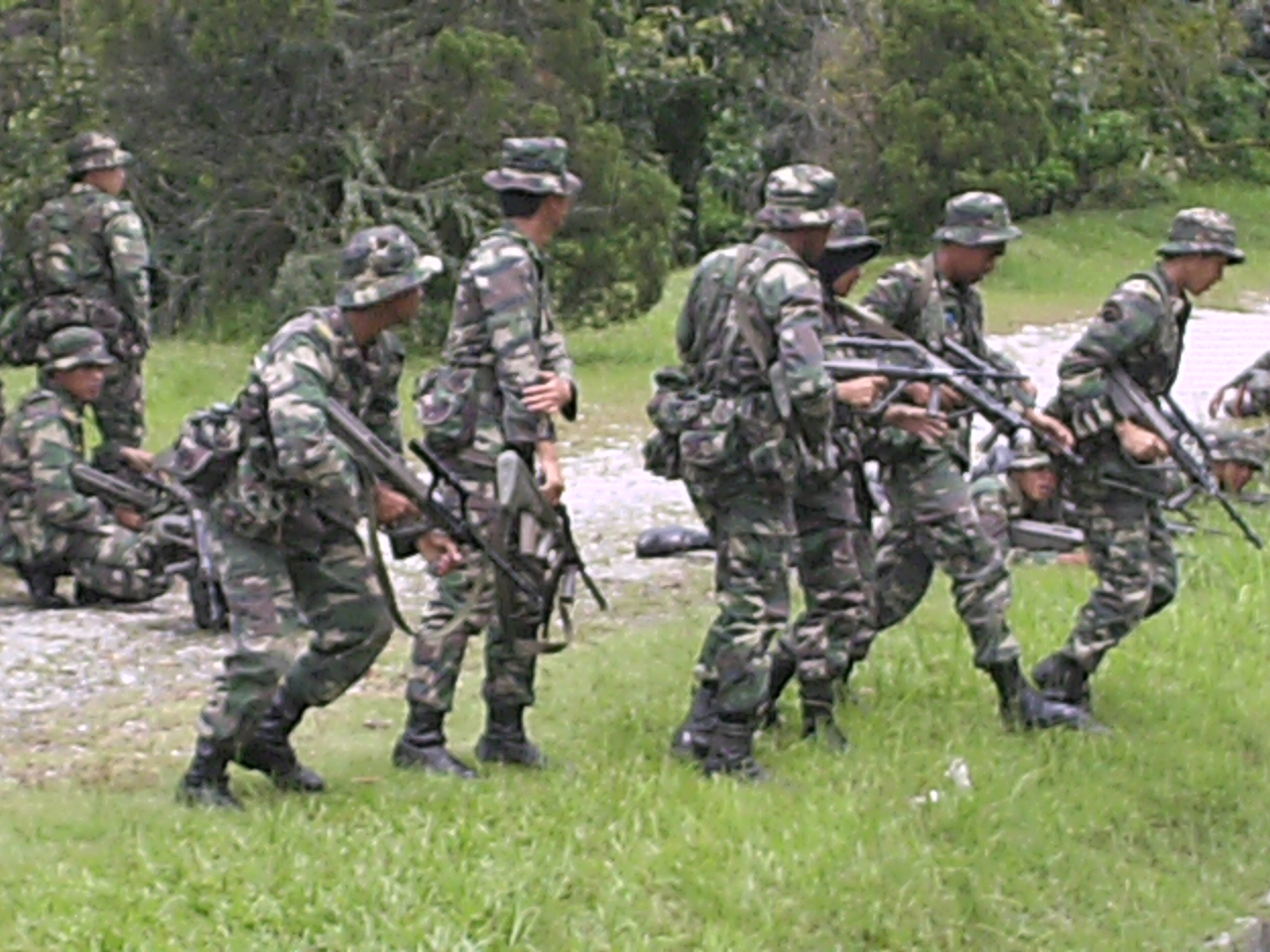
Cadets of National Defence University of Malaysia on an exercise. The institution is a post-secondary school operated by the Malaysian Armed Forces.

Secondary level institutions:

- Royal Military College (Malaysia) (Maktab Tentera Diraja)

University level:

- National Defence University of Malaysia (University Pertahanan Nasional Malaysia) (foundation, bachelor's degree, master's degree, PhD and specialist courses)
- Armed Forces Defence College (Maktab Pertahanan Angkatan Tentera)

Specialist training and staff institutions:

- Officers Cadet School in Port Dickson (OCS)
- Malaysian Armed Forces Staff College (Maktab Turus Angkatan Tentera)
- Armed Forces Health Training Institute (Institut Latihan Kesihatan Angkatan Tentera)
- Malaysian Peacekeeping Training Centre (Pusat Latihan Pengaman Malaysia)

Reserve Officer Training Units (Malay: Pasukan Latihan Pegawai Simpanan or PALAPES) or ROTU exists only in public universities in Malaysia. This is a tertiary institution based officer commissioning program to equip students as officer cadets with military knowledge and understanding for service as commissioned officers in the reserve components of the various branches of the Malaysian Armed Forces.

== Mexico ==
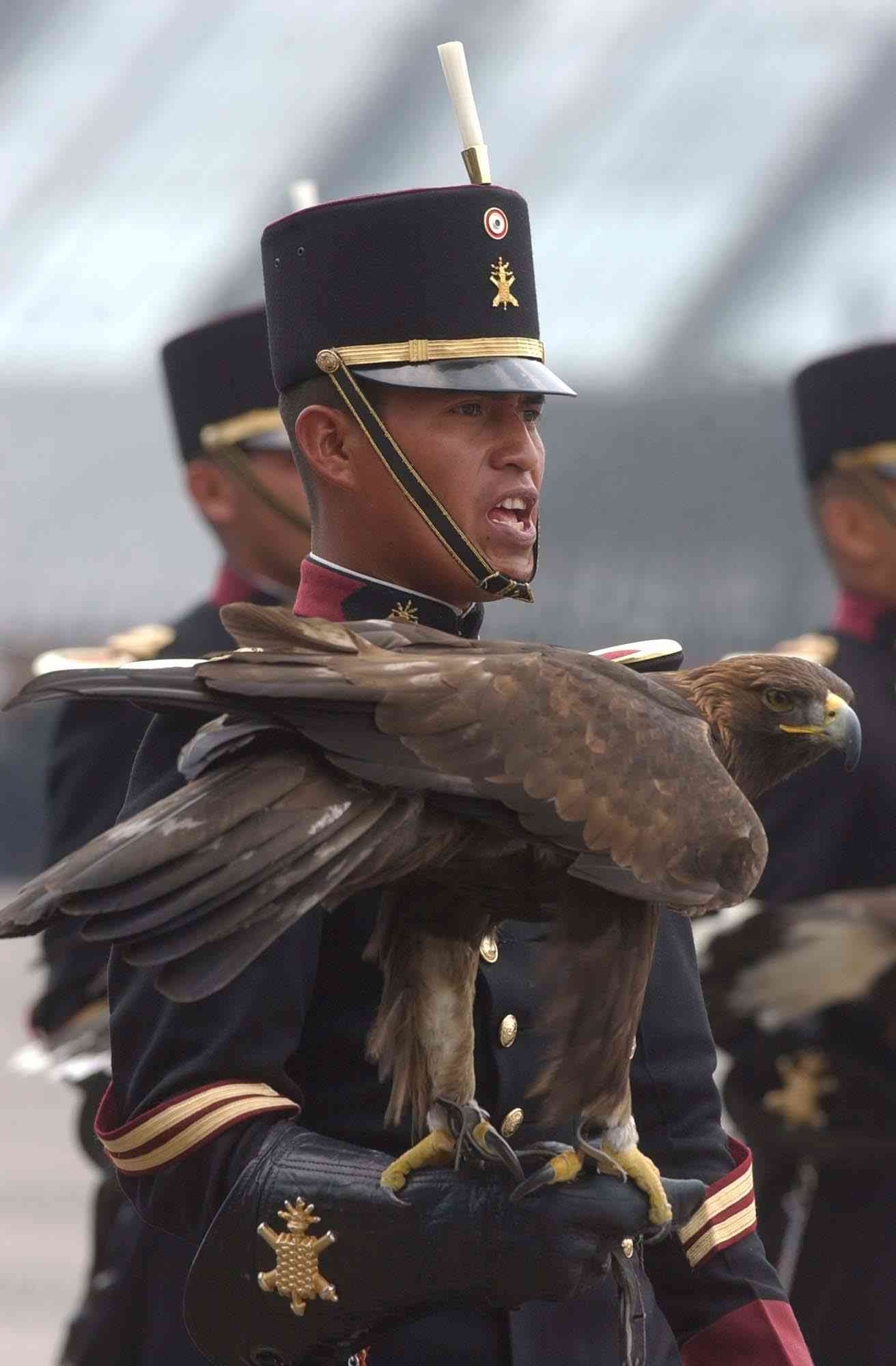
A cadet of Mexico's Heroic Military Academy with a golden eagle, the institution's mascot

- Heroica Escuela Naval Militar
- Heroico Colegio Militar
- Colegio del Aire

== Moldova ==
- Alexandru cel Bun Military Academy

== Mongolia ==
- National Defense University
  - Military Music College of Mongolia

== Myanmar ==
- Defence Services Academy (DSA)
- Defence Services Technological Academy (DSTA)
- Defence Services Medical Academy (DSMA)
- Officer Training School (Myanmar) (OTS)
- National Defence College (Myanmar) (NDC)
- Defence Services Institute of Nursing and Paramedical Science

== Namibia ==
- Namibian Military School

== Nepal ==
- Nepalese Military Academy, Kharipati, Bhaktapur

== Netherlands ==
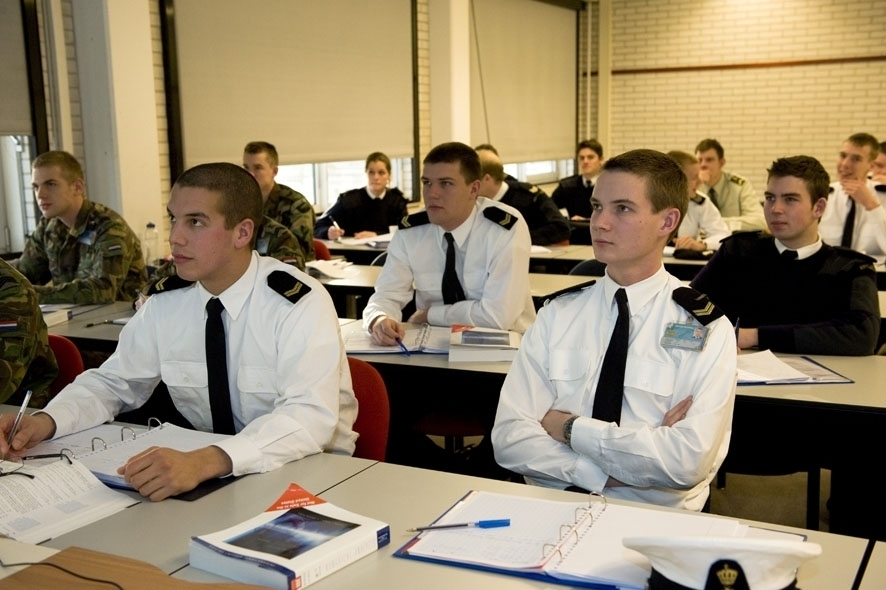
Cadets in a classroom of the Netherlands' Royal Naval Institute. The academy is a part of Nederlandse Defensie Academie.

- Koninklijke Militaire Academie
- Royal Naval College (Netherlands)

== New Zealand ==
Tier One – initial officer training

- New Zealand Commissioning Course, Waiouru (NZ Army)
- Initial Officer Training, Woodbourne (RNZAF)
- Officer Training School, Devonport Naval Base

Tier Two – junior officer education

- NZDF Junior Staff Course, New Zealand Defence College

Tier Three – senior officer education

- NZDF Staff Course, New Zealand Defence College

== Nigeria ==
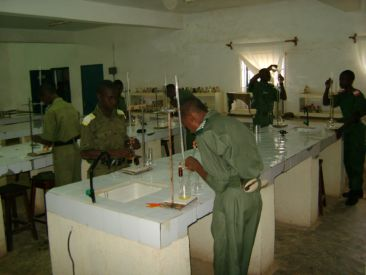
Cadets in a lab of Nigeria's Air Force Military School, a boys-only military high school

=== High school training ===
- Nigerian Military School, Zaria – Nigerian Army military school for boys
- Air Force Military School, Jos, Nigeria, in Jos – Nigerian Air Force military school for boys
- Nigerian Navy Military School, Ikot Ntuen, Akwa Ibom State – Nigerian Navy military School for boys

=== Undergraduate officer training ===
- Nigerian Defence Academy, Kaduna – Nigerian Armed Forces university school

=== Postgraduate officer training ===
- Armed Forces Command and Staff College, Jaji, at Jaji, Kaduna – joint Nigerian Armed Forces higher studies institute for both indigenous and international students
- Nigerian Army College of Logistics, Lagos – school for training middle career Nigerian Army officers on military logistics
- National Defence College, Abuja – school for training senior officers of the Nigerian Armed Forces and also some members of the civil service
- Army War College Nigeria
- Naval War College Nigeria
- Air War College Nigeria

== Norway ==
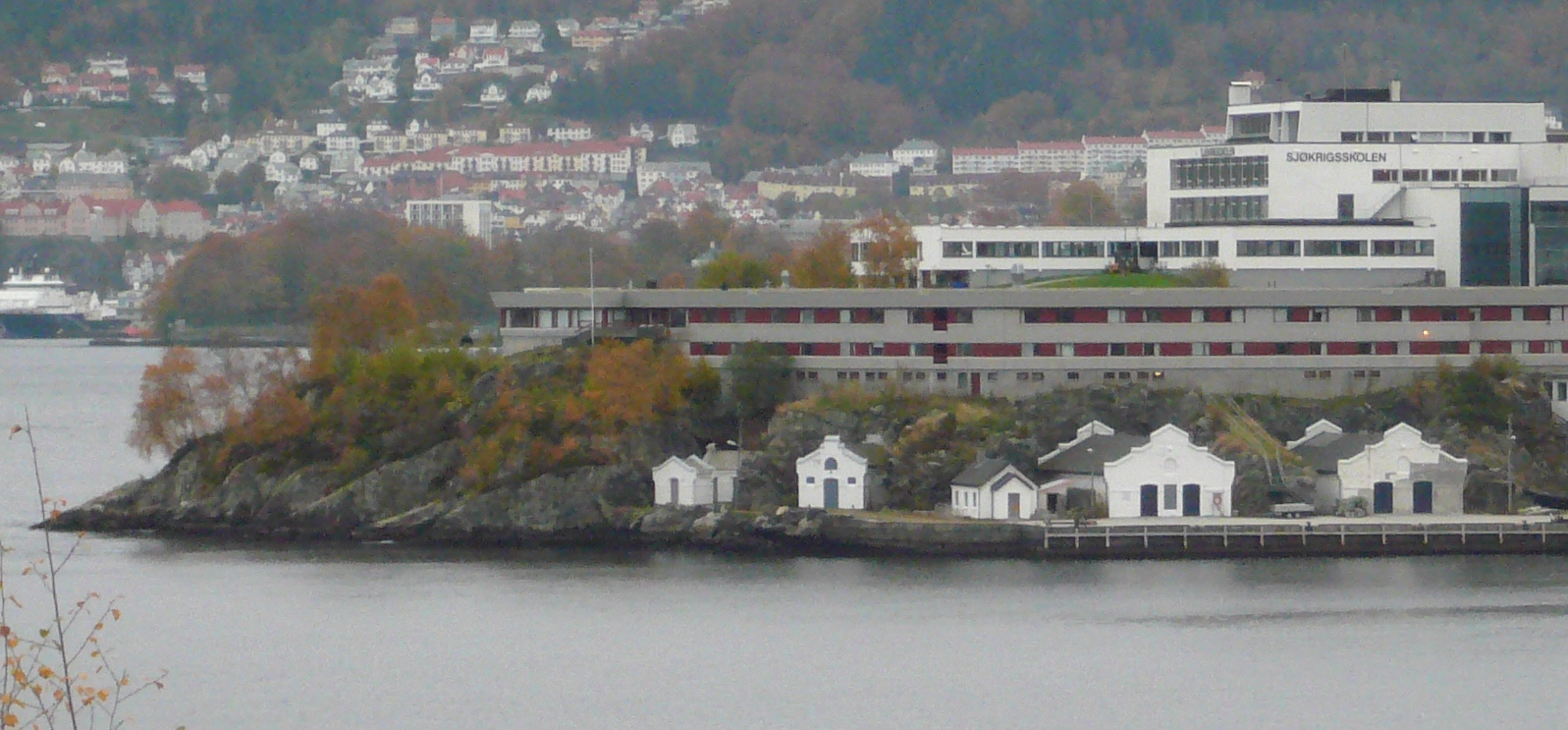
Buildings of the Norwegian Naval Academy, an undergraduate institution intended to instruct officers of the Royal Norwegian Navy

=== Undergraduate officer training ===
- Norwegian Military Academy, Linderud/Oslo (Norwegian Army)
- Norwegian Naval Academy, Laksevåg/Bergen (Royal Norwegian Navy)
- Norwegian Air Force Academy, Trondheim (Royal Norwegian Air Force)
- Norwegian Cyber Engineering School, Lillehammer (Norwegian Army)

=== Postgraduate training ===
- Norwegian Defence Staff College, Oslo (joint)
- Norwegian National Defence College, Oslo (civil service/very senior officers)

== Pakistan ==
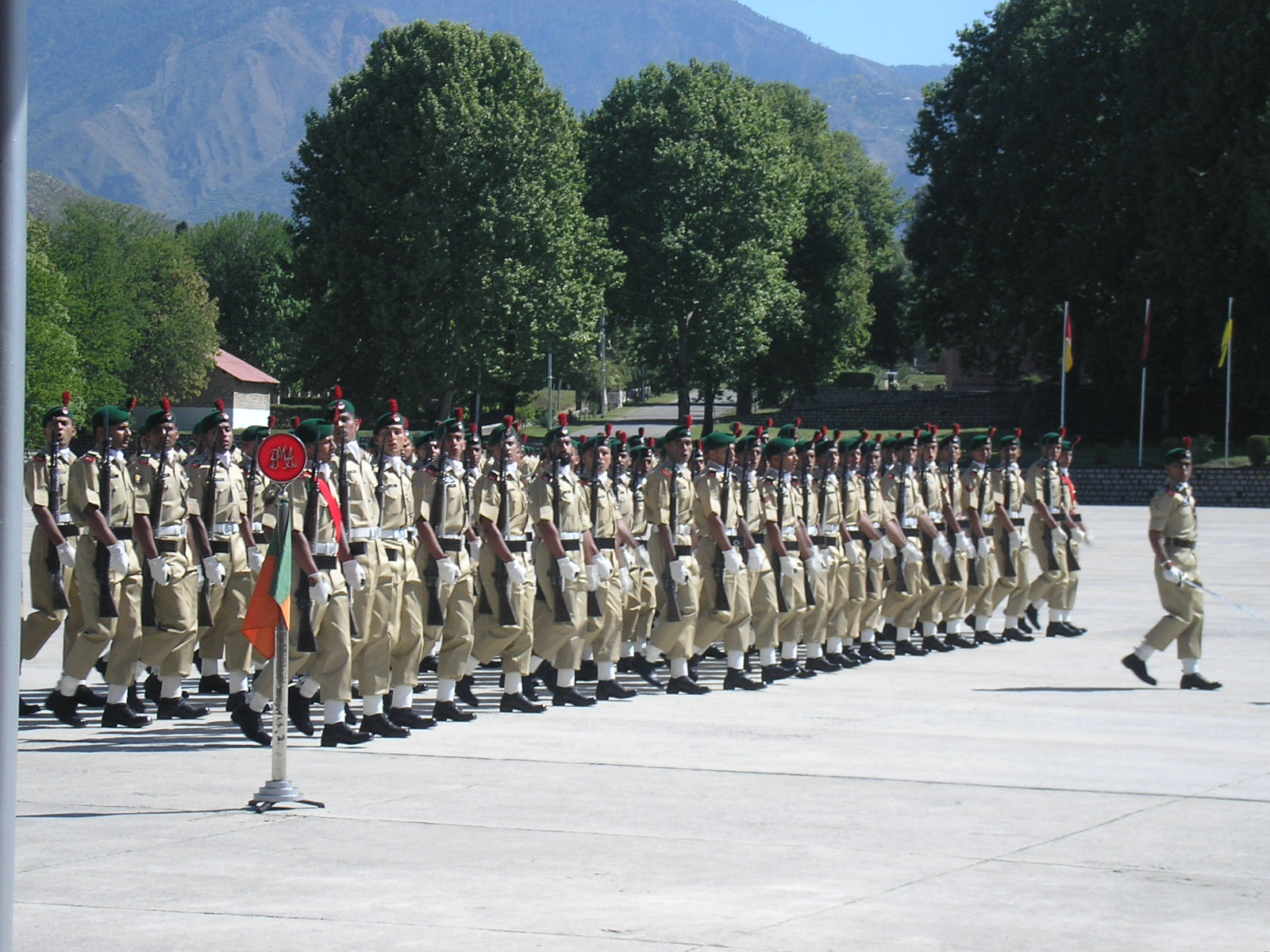
A passing out parade at Pakistan Military Academy

- Pakistan Military Academy, Kakul
- Pakistan Air Force Academy, Risalpur
- Pakistan Naval Academy, Karachi
- Command and Staff College, Quetta
- National Defence University, Islamabad
- Pakistan Navy War College, Lahore
- PAF Air War College, Karachi
- Army Burn Hall College, for boys, Abbottabad
- Army Public College of Management Sciences (public sector)
- Military College Jhelum, Jhelum District
- Military College Murree, Rawalpindi District
- Military College Sui, Dera Bugti District
- PAF College Sargodha
- PAF College Lower Topa
- Cadet College Razmak, Razmak North Waziristan Agency
- Cadet College Kohat
- Cadet College Hasan Abdal
- Cadet College Wana
- Cadet College Spinkai
- Cadet College Mastung
- Cadet College Pasrur
- Cadet College Petaro, Pakistan Navy
- Garrison Cadet College Kohat
- Cadet College Skardu
- Cadet College Mithi
- Cadet College Skardu
- Cadet College Swat

== Paraguay ==
- Francisco López Military Academy, in Capiatá, Paraguay

== People's Republic of China ==
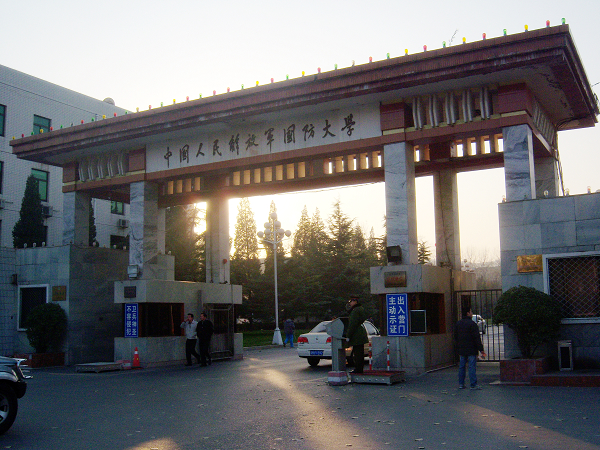
Main gate of the PLA National Defence University, a national university administered by the People's Liberation Army.

- PLA National Defense University
- National University of Defense Technology
- PLA Information Engineering University
- Army Command College of the Chinese People's Liberation Army

== Peru ==
Undergraduate officer training

- Chorrillos Military School (Peruvian Army)
- Peruvian Naval School (Peruvian Navy)
- Peruvian Air Force Officers' School (Peruvian Air Force)

== Philippines ==
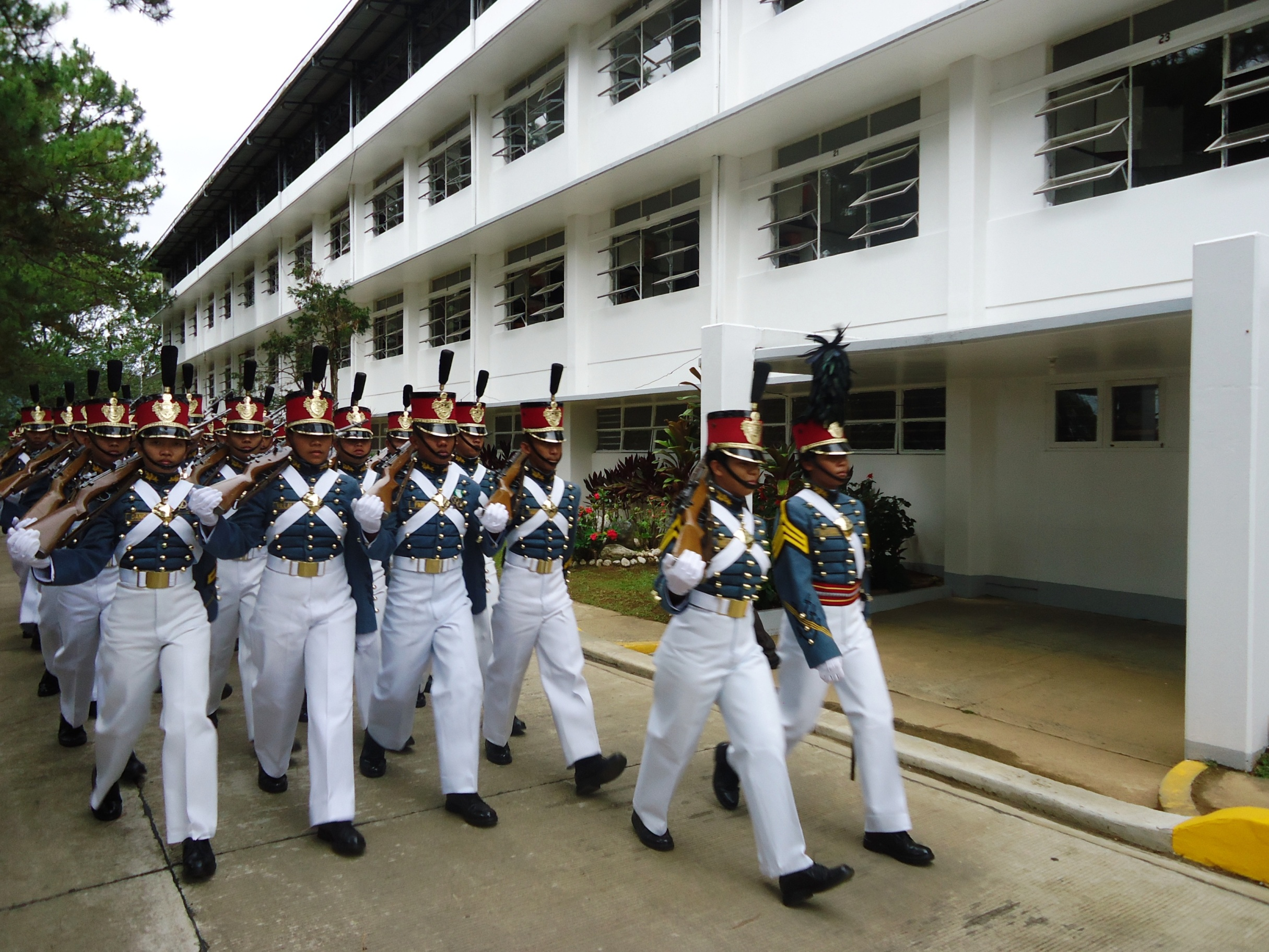
Graduating cadets of Philippine Military Academy at a homecoming

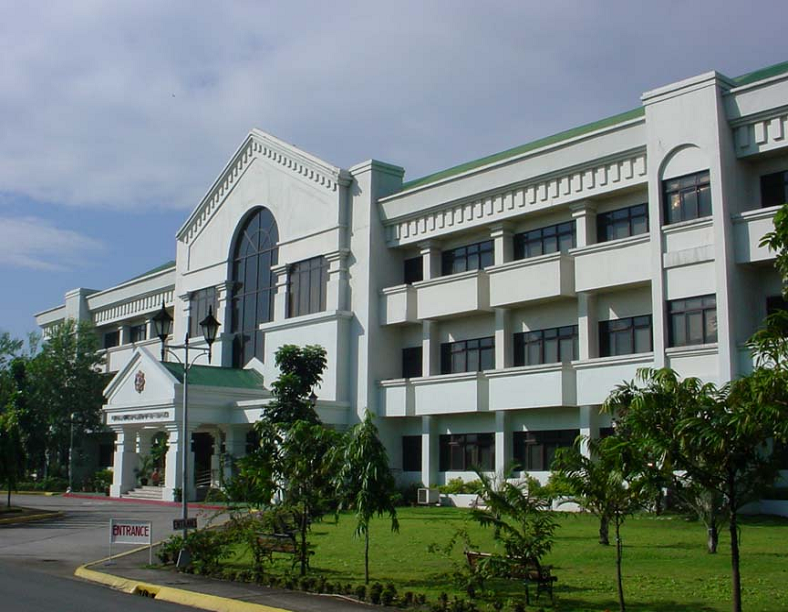
The National Defense College of the Philippines is a graduate-level military college established in 1963.

The Philippines patterned all its service academies after the United States Military Academy (West Point) and the United States Merchant Marine Academy (King's Point).

These higher education institutions are operated by the Philippine Government and grant different baccalaureate degrees.

- Philippine Military Academy (Akademiyang Militar ng Pilipinas), City of Baguio – It is the primary training school of the Armed Forces of the Philippines for would be regular commissioned officers of the Philippine Army, Philippine Navy, Philippine Marine Corps and the Philippine Air Force. It is under the control of the Department of National Defense. Its former name was the Philippine Constabulary Academy. During the American colonial rule era, U.S. Army cavalry officers established the school for the professionalization of the enlisted personnel of the defunct Philippine Constabulary. It was renamed the Philippine Military Academy before the 1930s. In 1992, PMA stopped providing graduates to the Philippine Constabulary after the passage of Republic Act 6975 which resulted in the merger of the Philippine Constabulary and the Integrated National Police. The merged institutions was named the Philippine National Police. Beginning in 1993, PMA became a co-educational school.
- Philippine Merchant Marine Academy, Zambales – It is a school for students who shall serve in different private shipping companies, foreign or local. Its graduates may serve in the Philippine Coast Guard and the Philippine Navy as an ensign after graduation depending upon their choice. All PMMA graduates are also automatically appointed by the president of the Philippines as ensigns (2nd lieutenants) in the Philippine Navy Reserve. This is the oldest of the Philippine service academies having been established in 1820 during the long period of Spanish colonial rule in the country, and was first situated in Manila for many years.

Aside from the PMA and the PMMA, all three branches of the AFP have their own Officer Candidate Course Programs for both men and women, patterned after their US counterparts.

The nation's higher military colleges are:

- Armed Forces of the Philippines Command and General Staff College, Quezon City – educates officers of the AFP not exceeding the ranks of Colonel or Navy Captain
- National Defense College of the Philippines, Quezon City – is a school for senior AFP officers for military/naval planning and to ready them in holding the ranks of Brigadier General/Commodore. Notable civilians may enroll and be given the honorary rank of Lieutenant Colonel/Commander in the AFP Reserve upon graduation.

== Poland ==
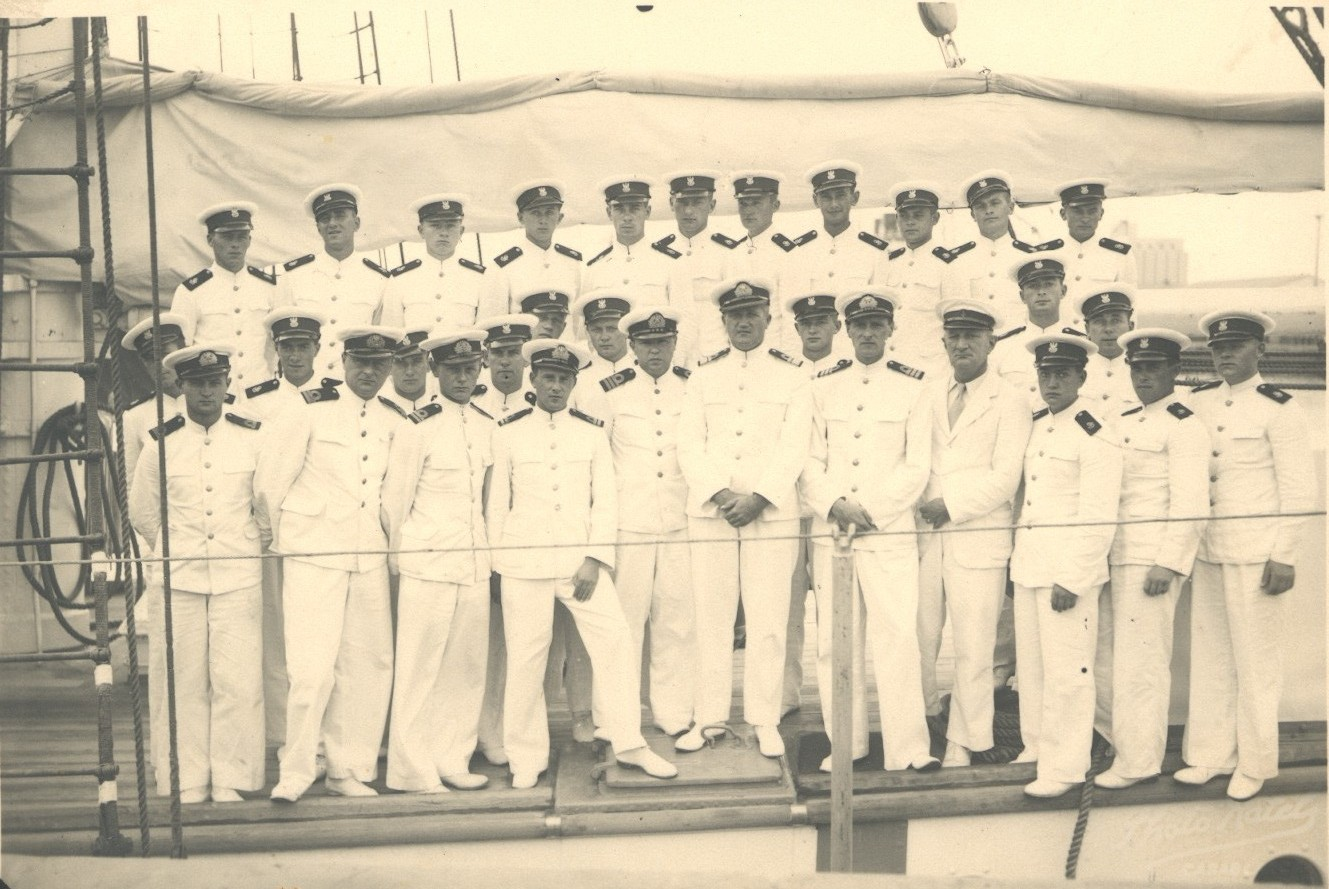
Cadets of the Polish Naval Academy aboard the ORP Iskra, 1937

- War Studies University
- Military University of Technology in Warsaw
- Tadeusz Kościuszko Land Forces Military Academy in Wrocław
- Polish Air Force Academy in Dęblin
- Heroes of Westerplatte Naval Academy in Gdynia
- Faculty of Military Medicine of the Medical University in Łódź

== Portugal ==
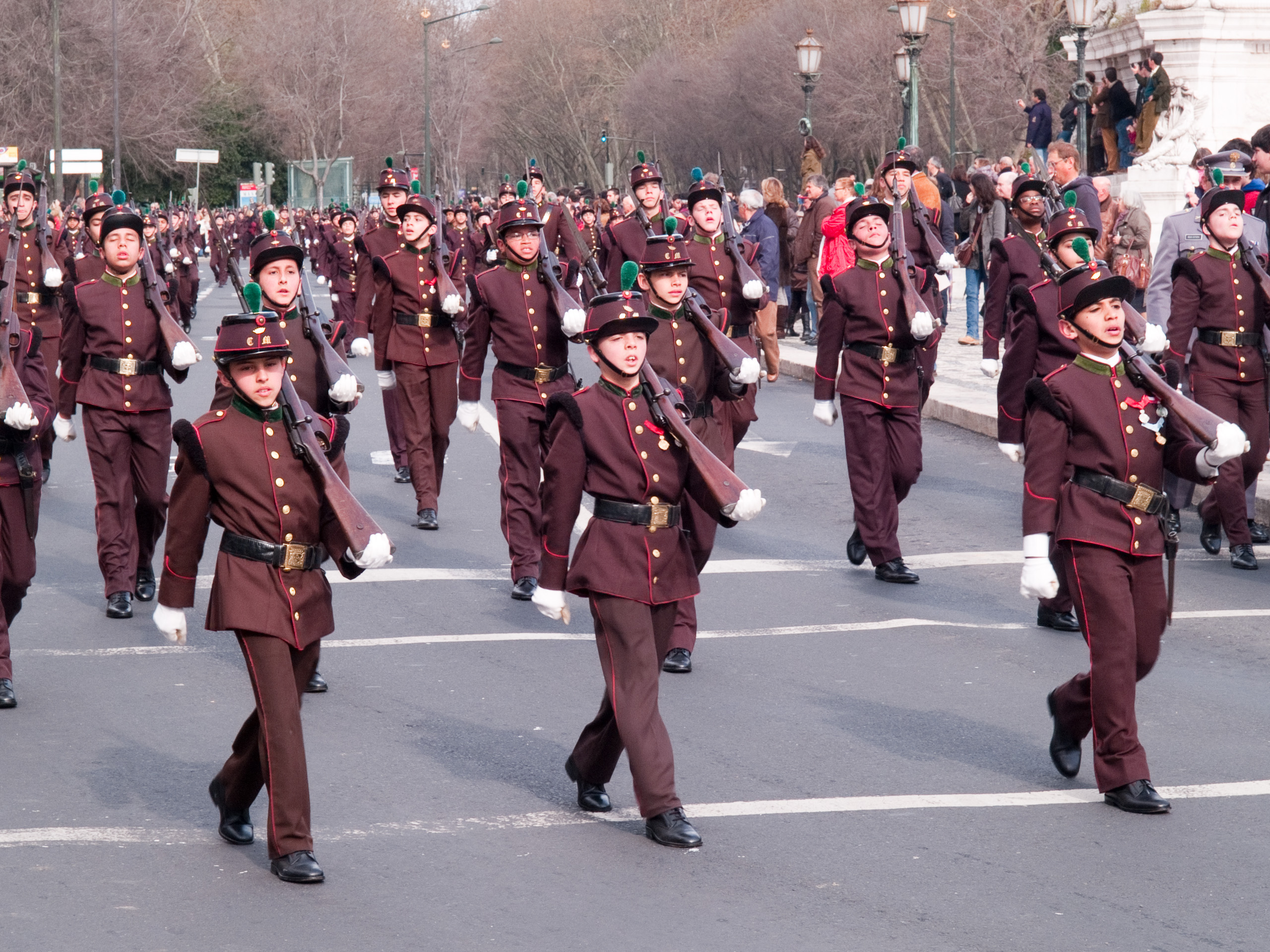
Students of Colégio Militar on parade. The school is one of two pre-university institutions in Portugal.

=== Pre-university level institution ===
- Colégio Militar, Lisbon – military basic and high school
- Instituto dos Pupilos do Exército, Lisbon – vocational education military school

=== Undergraduate officer training ===
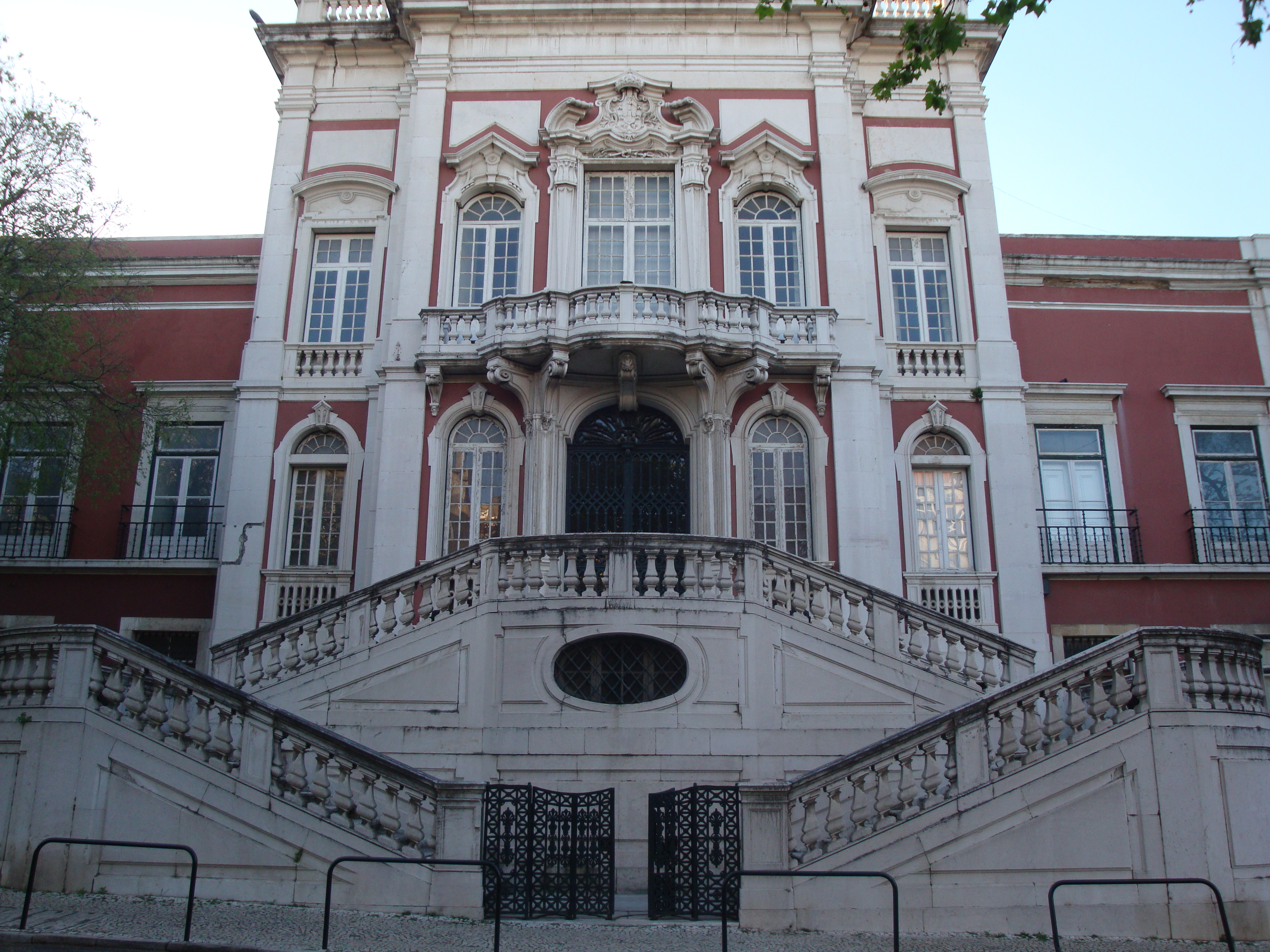
The Bemposta Palace of the Portuguese Military Academy, an undergraduate-level institution

- Academia Militar, Lisbon and Amadora – Portuguese Army and Republican National Guard university school
- Escola Naval, Almada – Portuguese Navy university school
- Academia da Força Aérea, Sintra – Portuguese Air Force university school

=== Postgraduate and staff training ===
- Instituto Universitário Militar, Lisbon – joint command and staff college

== Republic of China (Taiwan) ==
- R.O.C. Military Academy
- R.O.C. Naval Academy
- R.O.C. Air Force Academy
- R.O.C. Air Force Institute of Technology
- Army Academy R.O.C.
- National Defense University
  - War College
  - Army Command and Staff College
  - Naval Command and Staff College
  - Air Force Command and Staff College
  - Institute of Technology
  - Management College
  - Political Warfare College
- National Defense Medical Center
- Chung Cheng Armed Forces Preparatory School

== Republic of Ireland ==
- Defence Forces Training Centre
- Naval College
- Air Corps College

== Republic of Korea ==
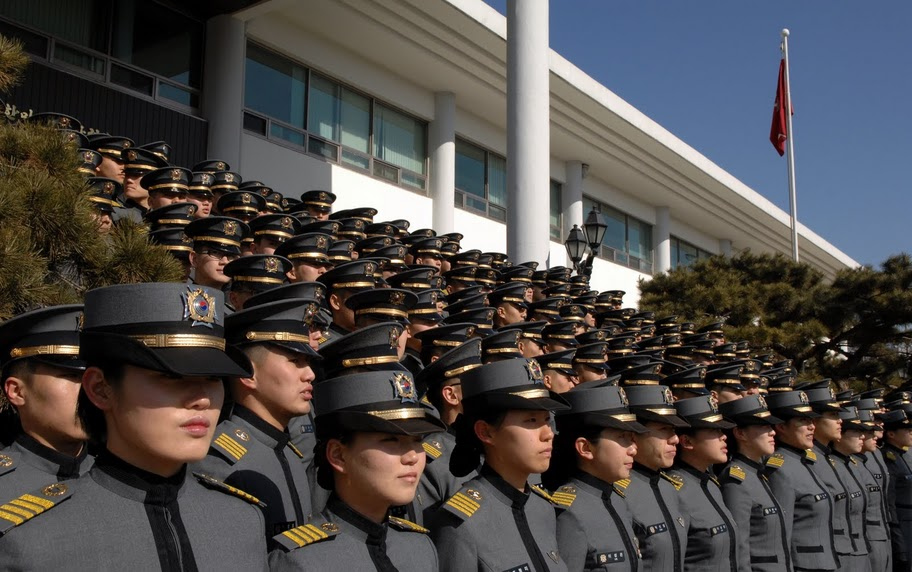
Cadets of the Korean Military Academy during a visit to United Nations Command

The three main military academies:

- Korea Military Academy (Army)
- Korea Naval Academy
- Korea Air Force Academy

Other military academies:

- Korea Army Academy at Yeongcheon, formerly Korea Third Military Academy
- Armed Forces Nursing Academy

== Romania ==
- Carol I National Defence University (Universitatea Națională de Apărare Carol I), Bucharest
- Technical Military Academy (Academia Tehnică Militară), Bucharest
- Land Forces:
  - Nicolae Bălcescu Land Forces Academy, Sibiu
- Air Forces:
  - Academia Forțelor Aeriene (Air Forces Academy), Braṣov
- Naval Forces:
  - Mircea cel Bătrân Naval Academy, Constanṭa

== Russia ==
=== First stage of training ===
- The Cadet Corps is an admissions-based military middle school for young boys that was founded in the Russian Empire in 1732, soon becoming widespread throughout the country.

- Omsk Cadet Corps
- Karelia Cadet Corps
- Krasnoyarsk Cadet Corps
- Magnitogorsk Cadet Corps
- Georgy Zhukov Moscow Cadet Corps
- Moscow Cossacks Cadet Corps
- Moscow Cadet Corps of Military Music
- Moscow Cadet Corps of the Ministry of Emergency Situations of Russia
- Moscow Diplomatic Cadet Corps
- Moscow Cadet Corps "Heroes of the Battle of Stalingrad"
- St.Petersburg Space Forces Cadet Corps
- St.Petersburg Strategic Rocket Forces Cadet Corps
- St.Petersburg Artillery Cadet Corps
- The 1st St. Petersburg Border guard Cadet Corps of the FSB
- Tambov Cadet Corps
- Toliatti Cadet Corps
- Ufa Cadet Corps

- The Sea Cadet Corps

- Kronstadt S.C.C.
- Moscow Representative Sea Cadet Corps of the Navigation and Mathematics School
- Moscow Sea Cadet Corps Heroes of Sevastopol

=== Secondary education ===
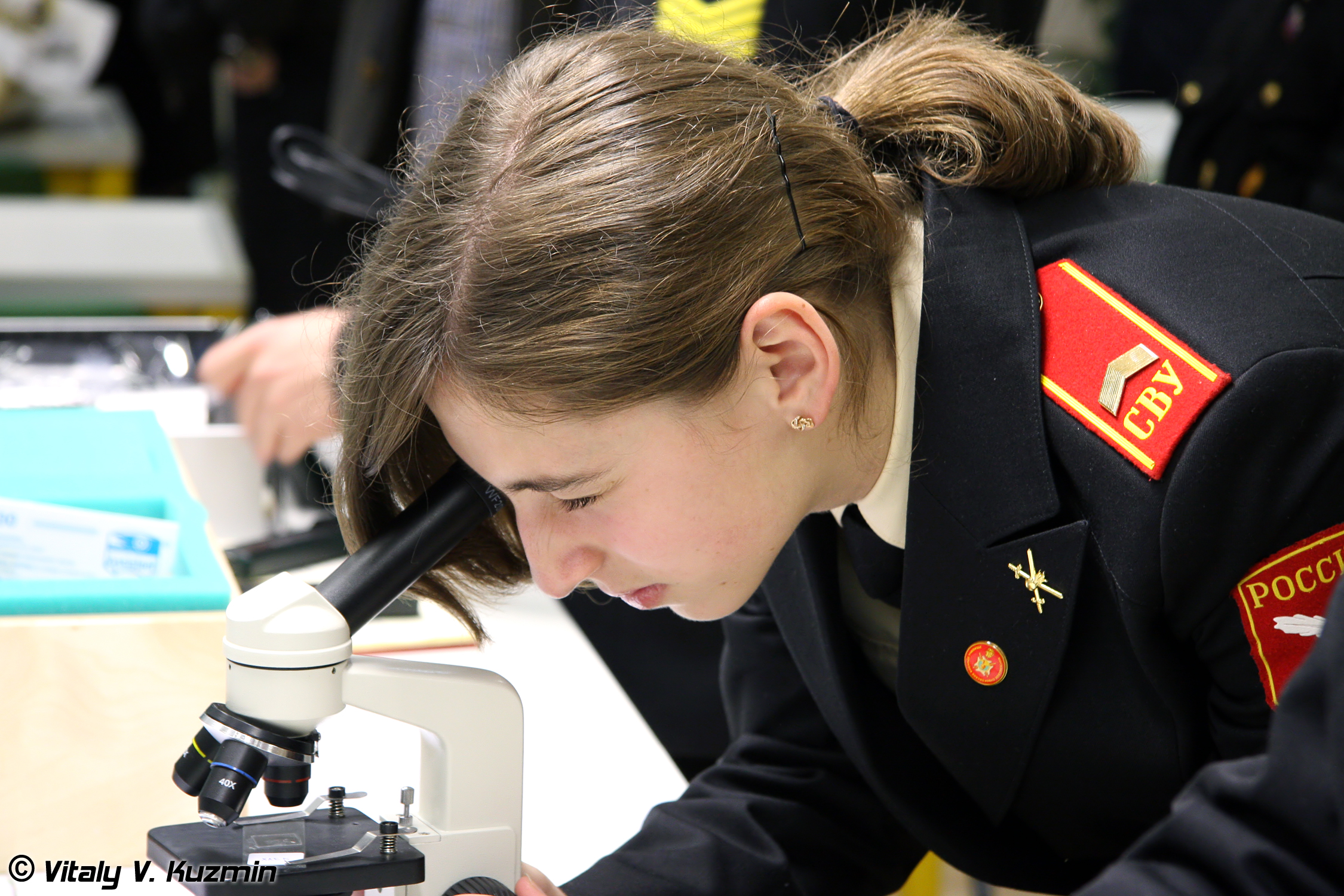
A cadet of Moscow Suvorov Military School, the first of several Suvorov Military Schools established throughout Russia

- Suvorov Military Schools are a type of boarding school in modern Russia for boys aged 14–18. Education in such these schools focuses on military related subjects.

- Irkutsk S.M.S.
- Kazan S.M.S.
- Moscow S.M.S.
- Moscow Military Music College
- North Caucasus S.M.S.
- Orenburg S.M.S.
- Perm S.M.S.
- St. Petersburg Space Forces S.M.S.
- Tula S.M.S. (reopening 2016 after 56 years of closure)
- Tver S.M.S.
- Ulyanovsk S.M.S.
- Ussuriysk S.M.S.
- Yekaterinburg S.M.S.

- Nakhimov Naval School is a form of higher naval education for teenagers introduced in modern Russia.

- St. Petersburg N.N.S.
- Murmansk N.N.S.
- Kaliningrad N.N.S
- Sevastopol N.N.S.
- Vladivostok N.N.S.

=== Post-secondary education ===
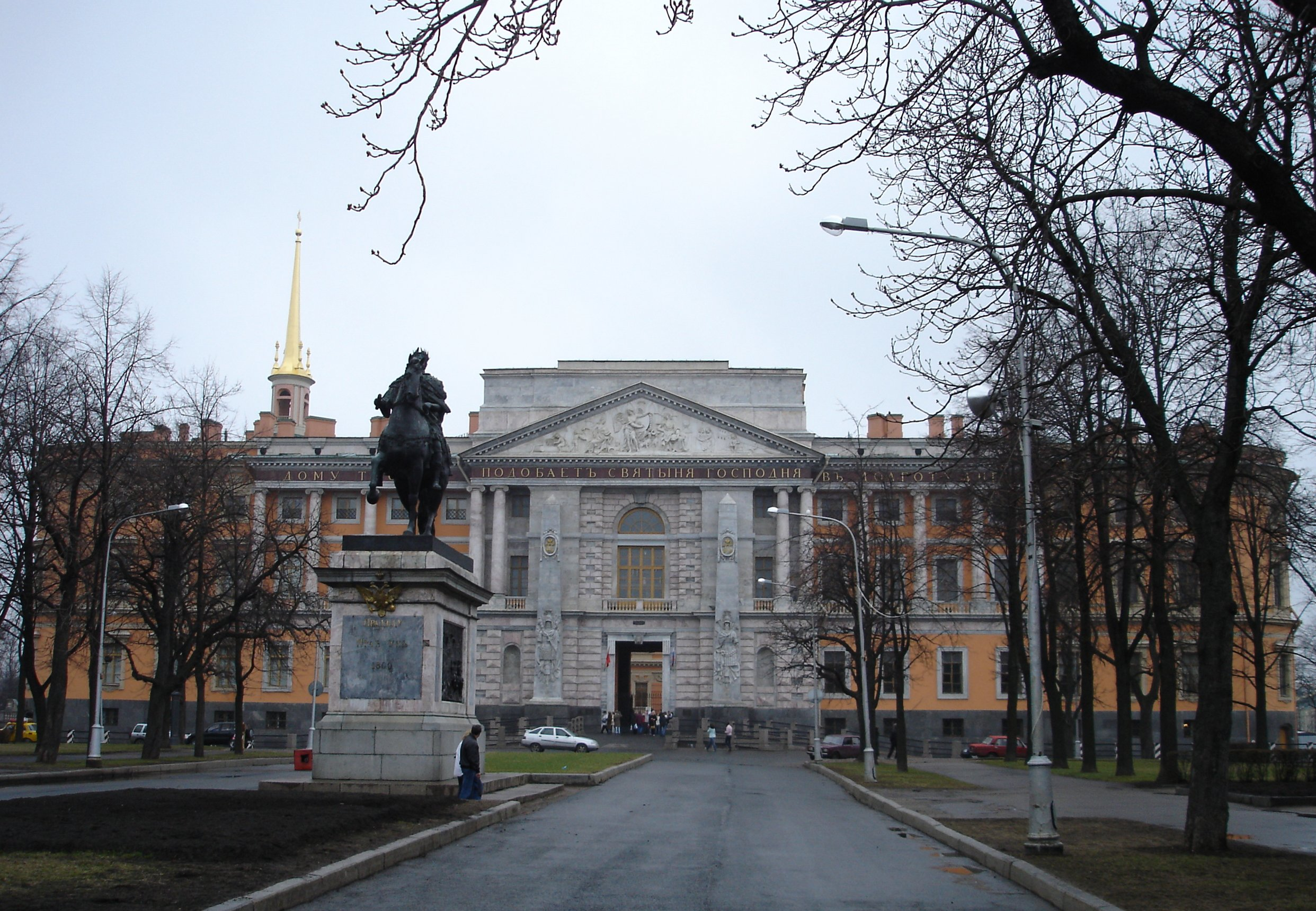
The Engineers Castle of Russia's Military Engineering-Technical University, with a monument to Peter the Great in the foreground

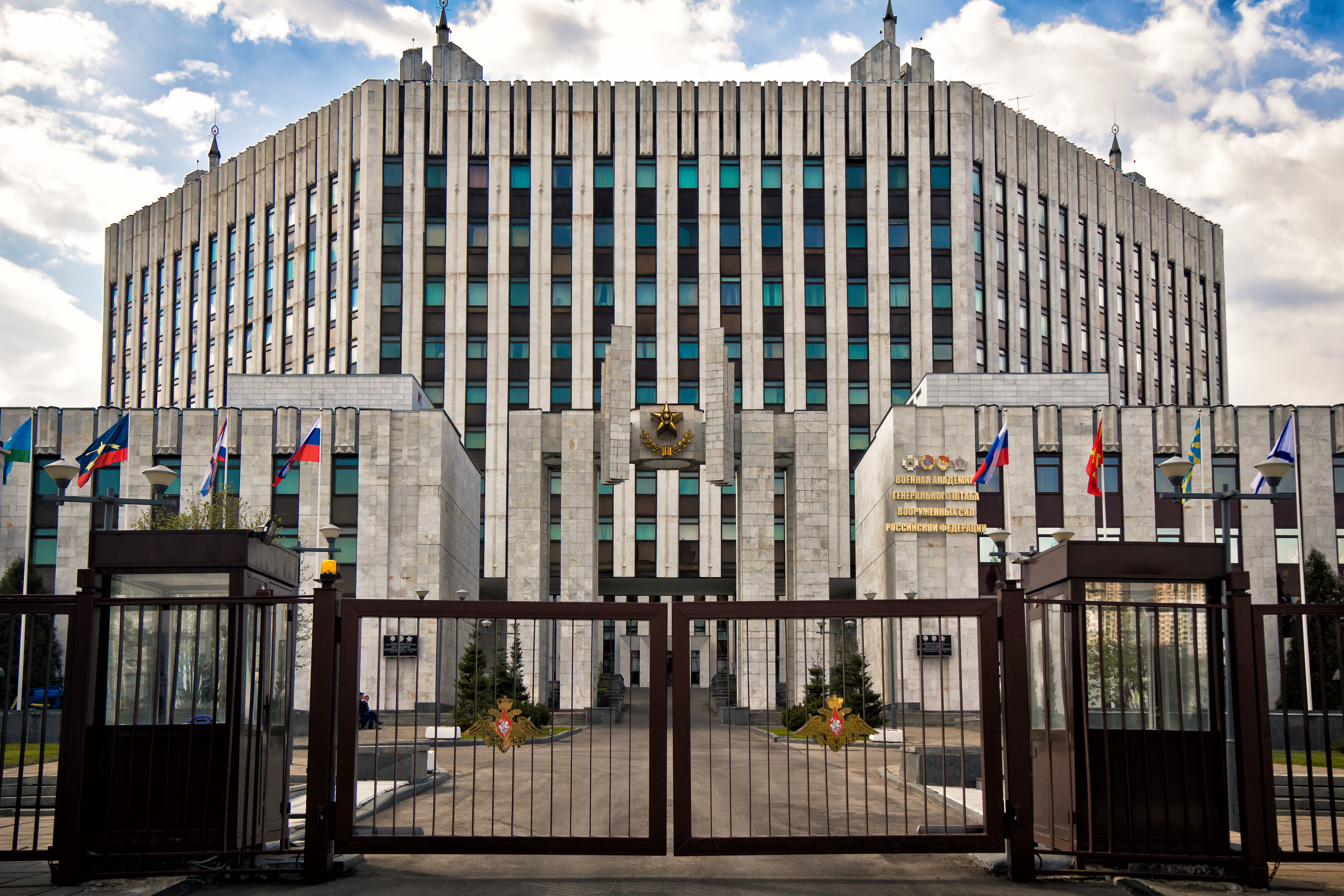
Established in 1832, the Military Academy of the General Staff of the Armed Forces of Russia is a post-graduate military academy.

- Combined Arms Academy of the Armed Forces of the Russian Federation
- Gagarin Air Force Academy (now the Gagarin-Zhukovsky Combined Air Force Academy)
- Military Engineering-Technical University
- Saint Petersburg Mining Institute
- Alexander Popov Naval Radio-electronic Academy
- Military Materiel Security Academy
- Pacific Naval Institute
- Moscow Peter the Great Strategic Rocket Forces Academy
- Moscow Higher Military Command School
- Baltic Naval Institute
- Nakhimov Black Sea Higher Naval School
- Military University of the Ministry of Defense of the Russian Federation
- Far Eastern Higher Combined Arms Command School
- Budyonny Military Academy of the Signal Corps
- Yekaterinburg Force Command School of Artillery
- Air General Staff Center of Missile and Air Defense Excellence
- Khabarovsk Military Commanders Training Academy
- Civil Defense Academy of the Ministry of Emergency Situations
- Sergey Kirov Military Communications Academy
- S.M. Kirov Military Medical Academy
- St. Petersburg Military College of Physical Fitness and Sports
- Marshal Aleksander Vasilevsky Military Academy of the Armed Forces Air Defense Branch
- Moscow Border Guards Superior College
- Military University of the Ministry of Internal Affairs

=== Staff college ===
- General staff Academy
- N. G. Kuznetsov Naval Academy

== Serbia ==
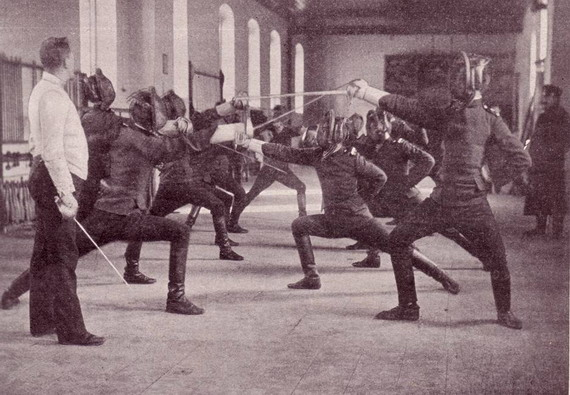
Cadets fencing at the Serbian Military Academy

- Military Academy Belgrade
- Military Medical Academy (Serbia)

== Singapore ==
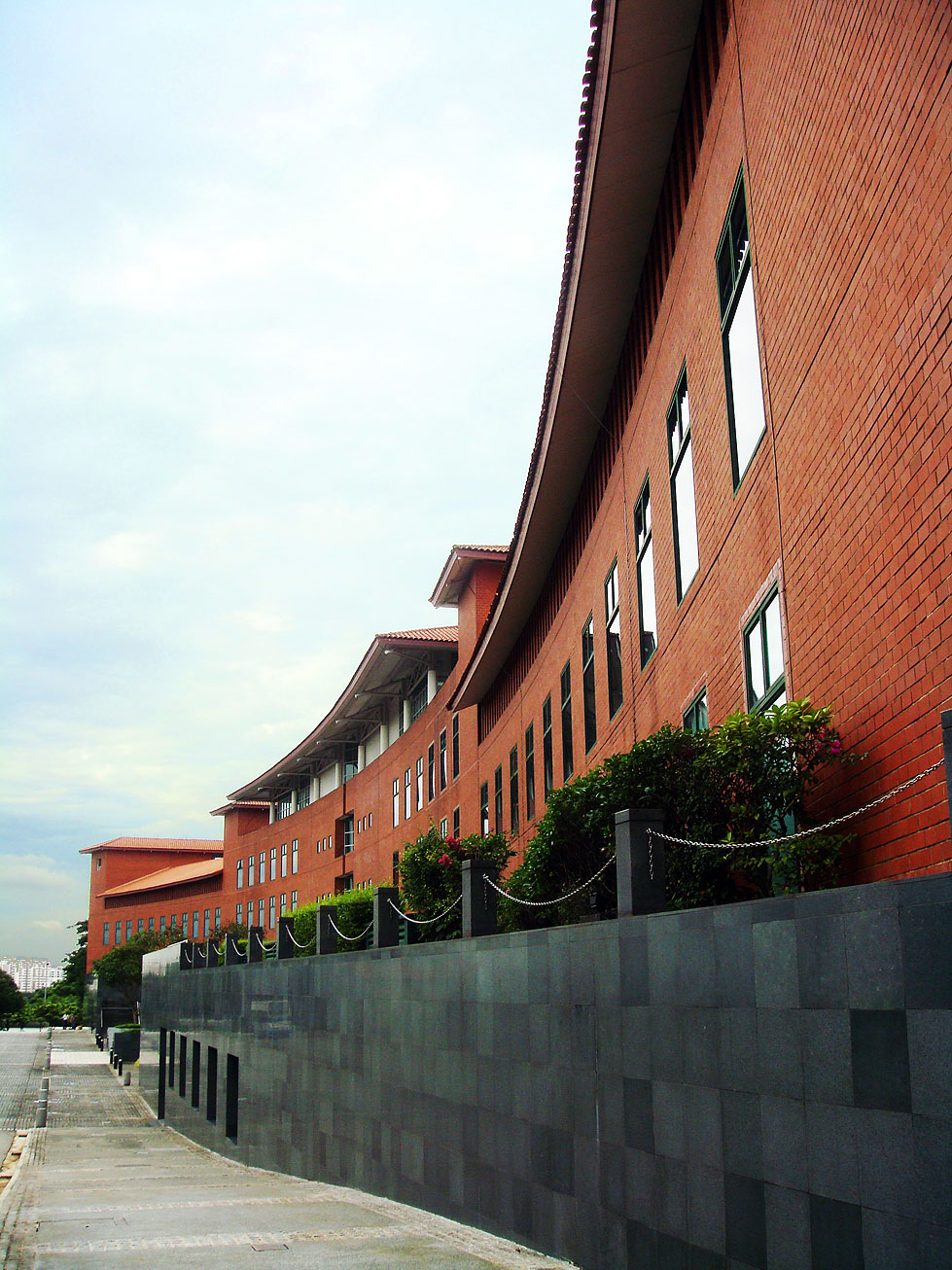
The Officer Cadet School within the SAFTI Military Institute as seen from the northwest.

- SAFTI Military Institute
  - Officer Cadet School (OCS): trains officers
  - SAF Advanced Schools: conducts specialised training for officers
  - Goh Keng Swee Command and Staff College: trains senior officers to take up command and staff appointments
- Specialist and Warrant Officer Institute (SWI)
  - SAFWOS Leadership School: trains warrant officers and military experts
  - Specialist and Warrant Officer Advanced School: conducts advanced courses for warrant officers, military experts and specialists (NCOs)
  - Specialist Cadet School: trains specialists (NCOs)

== Slovakia ==
- Akadémia ozbrojených síl generála Milana Rastislava Štefánika

== Somalia ==
- Camp TURKSOM trains both officers and NCOs, offers a two-year course for officers and a one-year course for NCOs.

== South Africa ==
- South African Military Academy provides officers in the SANDF with an opportunity to earn a 3yr BMil degree.

== Spain ==
- General Military Academy, Zaragoza
- Academia General del Aire, San Javier
- Naval Military Academy, Marín
- Escuela Superior de las Fuerzas Armadas
- Academia Central de la Defensa
- Academia de Artillería
- Academia de Infantería
- Academia de Caballería
- Academia de Ingenieros
- Academia de Logística
- Academia General Básica de Suboficiales
- Navy NCO School
- Academia Básica del Aire
- Escuela Militar de Montaña y Operaciones Especiales

== Sri Lanka ==
=== University ===
- General Sir John Kotelawala Defence University, Colombo

=== Officer training ===
- Sri Lanka Military Academy, Diyatalawa
- Naval and Maritime Academy, Trincomalee
- Air Force Academy, SLAF China Bay, Trincomalee

=== Staff training ===
- Defence Services Command and Staff College

== Sweden ==
=== Undergraduate officer training ===
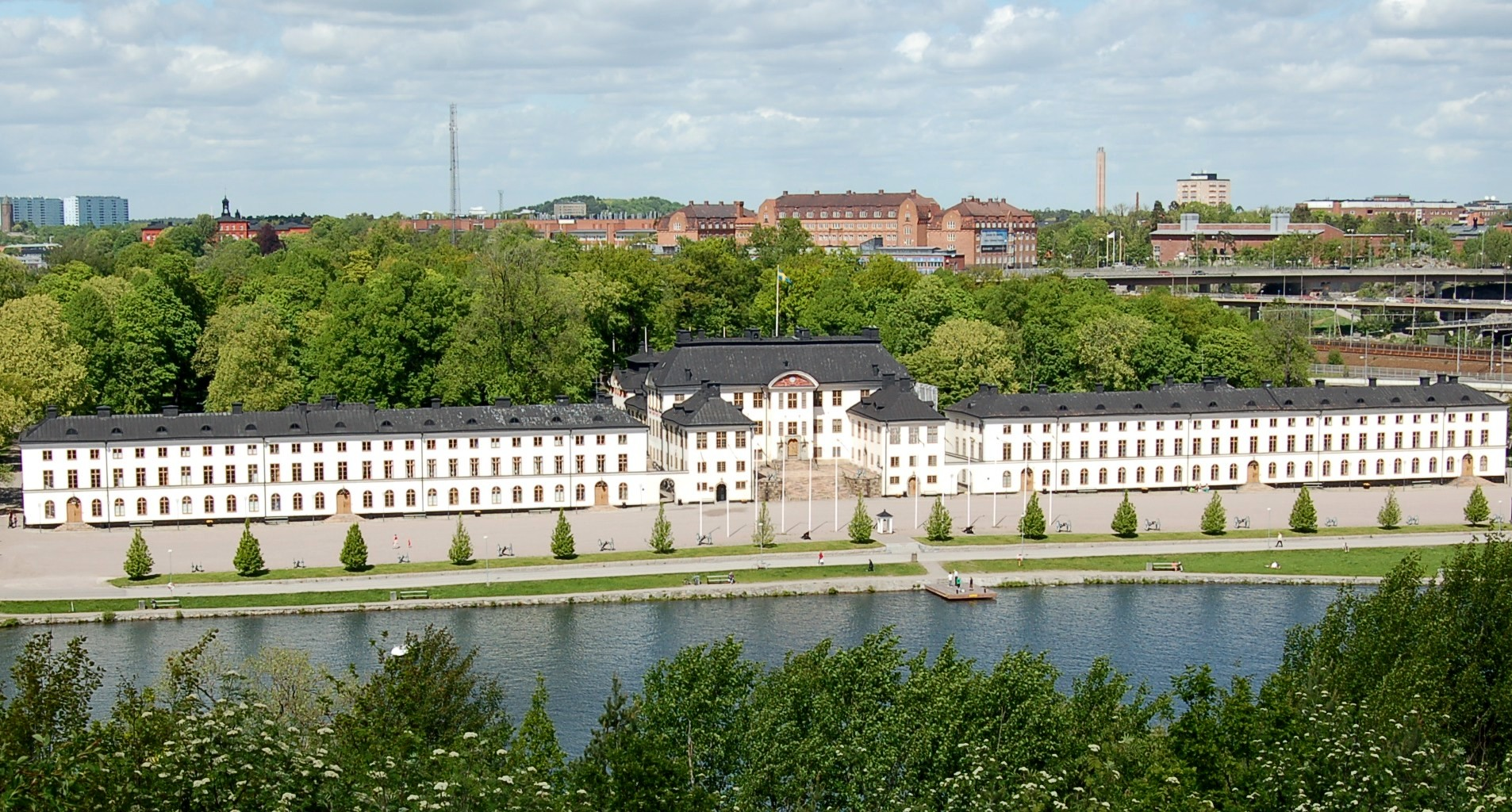
Karlberg Palace, home of Sweden's Military Academy Karlberg. Established in 1792, it is the oldest military academy in the world to remain in its original location.

- Military Academy Karlberg, officers
- Military Academy Halmstad, specialist officers (NCO) and reserve officers

=== Postgraduate training ===
- Swedish Defence University

== Tanzania ==
- Tanzania Military Academy

== Thailand ==
- Secondary level
  - Armed Forces Academies Preparatory School (secondary level)
  - Military Technical Training School; RTARF; RTA; RTN; RTAF
  - Naval Dockyard Apprentice School;RTN
- University level
  - Chulachomklao Royal Military Academy; RTA
  - Royal Thai Navy Academy; RTN; RTMC
  - Royal Thai Air Force Academy;RTAF; RTAF Security Force Command
  - Royal Thai Police Cadet Academy; RTP
- Medicine, University level
  - Phramongkutklao College of Medicine; RTARF; RTA; RTN; RTAF
  - Royal Thai Army Nursing College; RTA
  - Royal Thai Navy Nursing College; RTN
  - Royal Thai Air Force Nursing College; RTAF
  - Royal Thai Police Nursing College; RTP
- Non Commissioned Officer (NCO) schools
  - Army Non Commissioned Officer School; RTA
  - Naval Rating School;RTN; RTMC
  - Air Technical Training School; RTAF; RTAF Security Force Command
- Officer candidate school
  - RTAF Officer Training School; RTAF

== Turkey ==
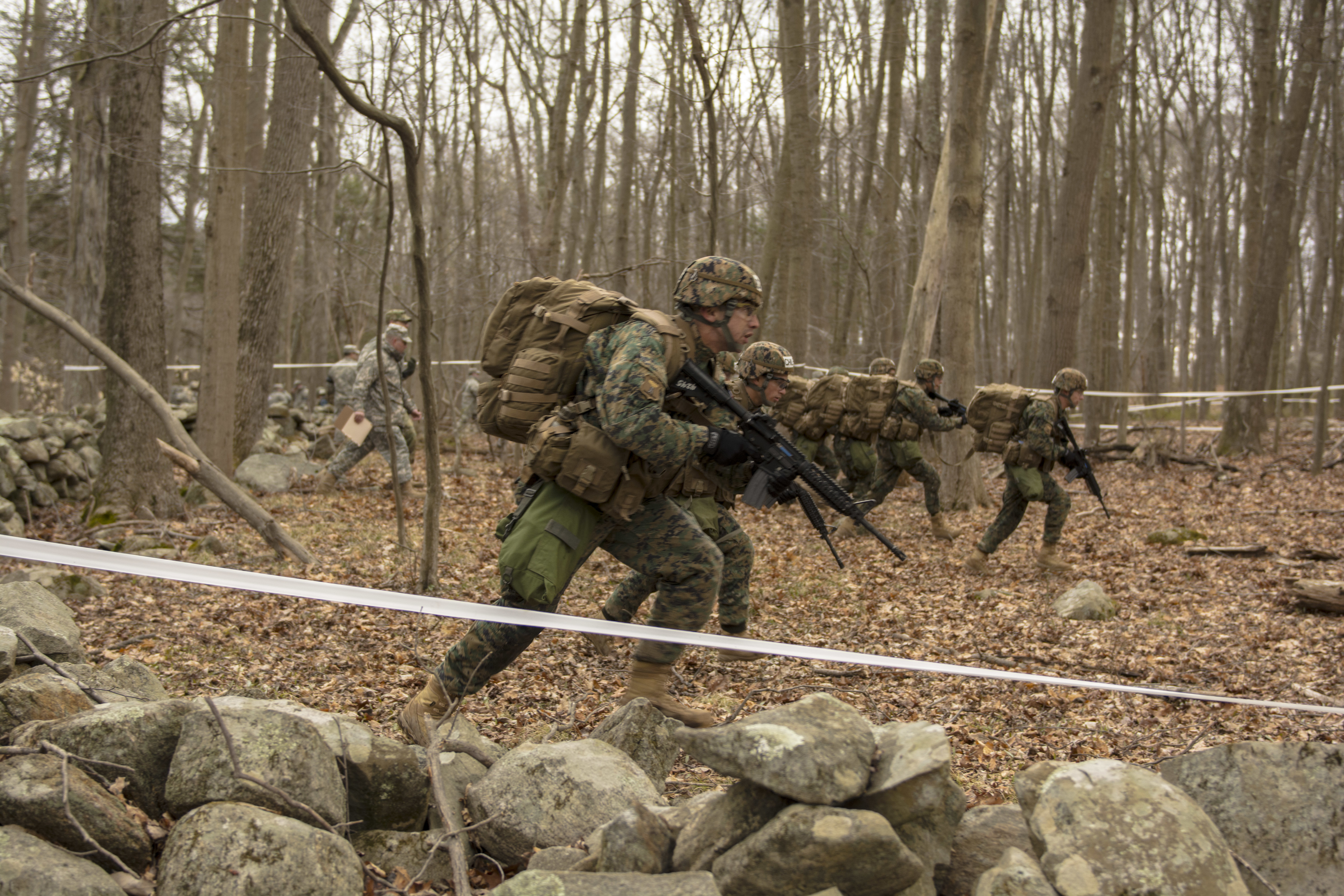
Cadets of the Turkish Military Academy at 2016 Sandhurst Competition at West Point

- National Defense University
- Turkish Military Academy
- Turkish Naval Academy
- Turkish Air Force Academy
- Turkish Gendarmerie and Coast Guard Academy

== Turkmenistan ==
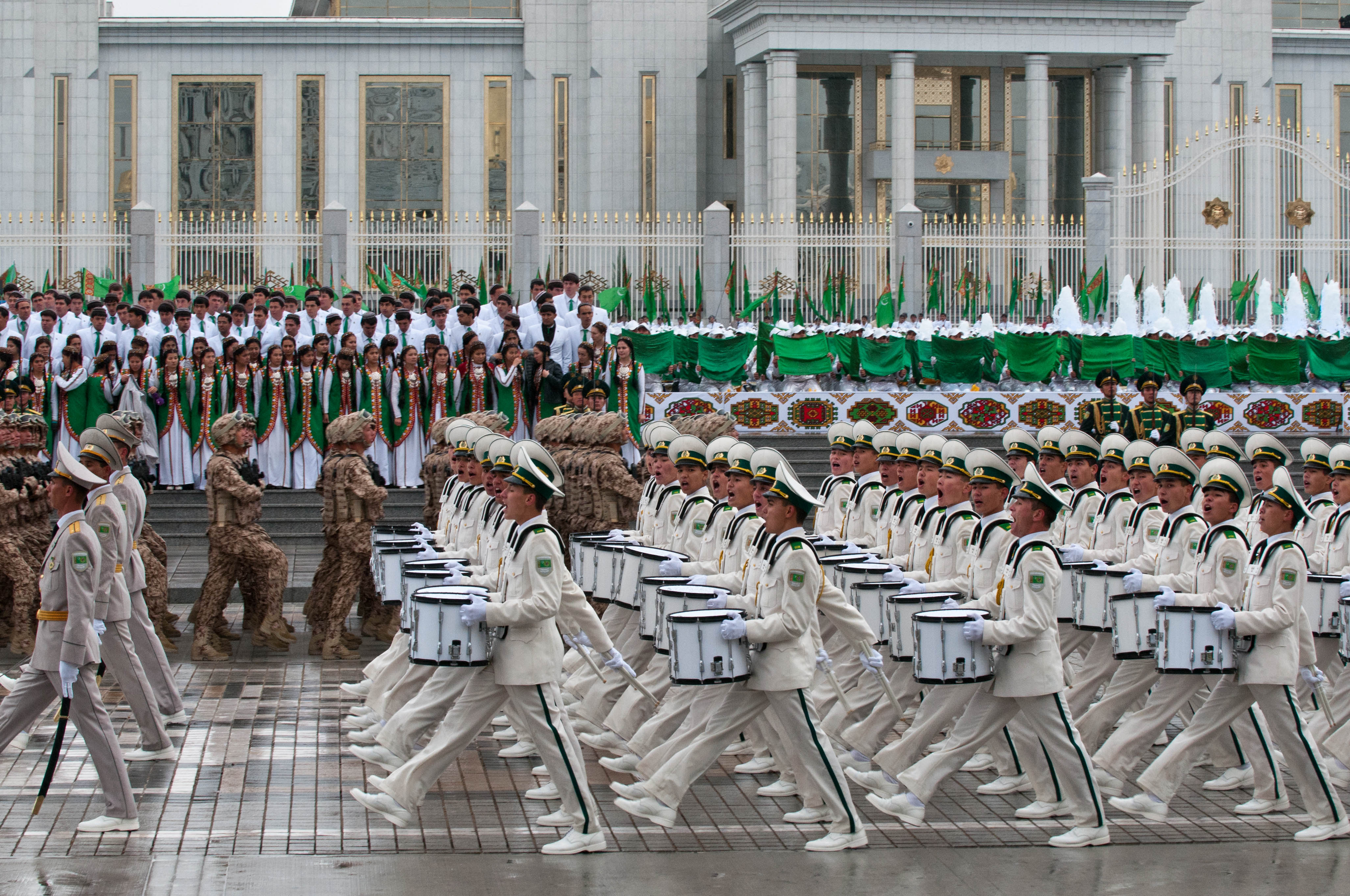
Cadets of the Berdimuhamed Annayev 1st Specialized Military School

- Military Academy of Turkmenistan
- Military Institute of the Ministry of Defense of Turkmenistan
  - Berdimuhamed Annayev 1st Specialized Military School (Ashgabat)
  - Alp Arslan 2nd Specialized Military School (Dashoguz)
  - Soltan Sanjar 3rd Specialized Military School (Mary)
- Turkmen State Border Service Institute
- Institute of the Ministry of Internal Affairs of Turkmenistan
- Turkmen National Security Institute
- Turkmen Naval Institute

== Uganda ==
Uganda maintains the followings military training institutions, as of December 2010:

- Bihanga Military Training School – at Bihanga, in Ibanda District, Western Uganda
- Kalama Warfare Training School – at Kabamba, Mubende District
- National Leadership Institute (NALI) – at Kyankwanzi, Kyankwanzi District
- Oliver Tambo School of Leadership – at Kaweweta, Nakaseke District
- Uganda Air Defence and Artillery School – at Nakasongola in Nakasongola District
- Uganda Military Airforce Academy – at Nakasongola in Nakasongola District
- University of Military Science and Technology – at Lugazi, Buikwe District
- Uganda Junior Staff College – at Qaddafi Barracks, Jinja
- Uganda Military Academy – at Kabamba, Mubende District
- Uganda Senior Command and Staff College – at Kimaka, Jinja
- Uganda Urban Warfare Training School – at Singo, Kiboga District

== Ukraine ==
=== Staff colleges ===
- National Defence University of Ukraine, Kyiv

=== Service academies ===
- Hetman Petro Sahaydachnyi National Ground Force Academy, Lviv
- Ivan Kozhedub Kharkiv National Air Force University, Kharkiv
- Naval College of the National University "Odesa Maritime Academy", Odesa
- Odesa Military Academy, Odesa
- Ukrainian Military Medical Academy, Kyiv
- Yevgeny Bereznyak Military Diplomatic Academy, Kyiv
- Military Institute of Taras Shevchenko Kyiv National University, Kyiv
- Military Institute of Telecommunication and Information Technologies named after the Heroes of Kruty, Kyiv
- Military Institute of Tank Forces named after the Verkhovna Rada of Ukraine NTU "KhPI", Kharkiv
- Zhytomyr Military Institute named after S.P. Korolev, Zhytomyr
- Military Legal Institute of the Yaroslav Mudryi National Law University, Kharkiv

=== Military service academies operated by the Ministry of Internal Affairs of Ukraine ===
- National Academy of the National Guard of Ukraine, Kharkiv
- National Academy of the State Border Service of Ukraine "Bohdan Khmelnytskyi", Khmelnytskyi
- National University of Civil Defense of Ukraine, Kharkiv

=== Other military service academies ===
- National Academy of the Security Service of Ukraine, Kyiv
- Academy of the State Penitentiary Service, Chernihiv
- Academy of Foreign Intelligence of Ukraine, Kyiv
- Institute for the Training of Legal Personnel for the Security Service of Ukraine, Kharkiv
- Institute of Special Communication and Information Protection of NTUU "KPI", Kyiv

=== Reserve Officers' Training Corps (Military educational units of higher education institutions of Ukraine) ===
A number of public and military universities have specialized military institutes, military colleges, faculties, departments of military training, divisions of military training, departments of disaster medicine and military medicine. The purpose of such institutions is the military training of students and cadets under the reserve officer training program, and some of them conduct training, retraining and advanced training of military specialists of the appropriate levels of higher education (bachelor or master) for military service in the Armed Forces of Ukraine, others formed in accordance with the laws Ukrainian military formations (Defence Forces of Ukraine), as well as law enforcement agencies for special purposes (Security Forces of Ukraine) and the State Transport Special Service of Ukraine.

=== Military colleges of non-commissioned officers (Military Sergeant Colleges of Ukraine) ===
- NCO School of the Hetman Petro Sahaydachnyi National Ground Force Academy, Lviv
- NCO School of the Ivan Kozhedub National Air Force University, Kharkiv'
- Department of Military Training of the Professional College of Maritime Transport of the National University "Odesa Maritime Academy", Odesa
- Department of Training of Medical Assistants for the Armed Forces of Ukraine of the D. K. Zabolotny Vinnytsia Medical College, Vinnytsia
- NCO School of the Kamyanets-Podilsky Ivan Ohienko National University, Kamyanets-Podilsky
- NCO College of the Military Institute of Telecommunication and Information Technologies named after the Heroes of Kruty, Kyiv
- NCO College of the National Technical University "Kharkiv Polytechnic Institute", Kharkiv'

=== Military High Schools (Military Lyceum) ===
- Ivan Bohun Military High School, Kyiv
- Vice Admiral Volodymyr Bezkorovayn Naval Military High School, Odesa
- Military High School of the Hetman Petro Sahaydachnyi National Ground Force Academy, Chervonohrad

=== Cadets corp (Lyceum with enhanced military and physical training) ===
A number of public state and regional lyceum (high school) with enhanced military and physical training (boarding schools) such of cadet corps in other countries.

== United Kingdom ==
=== Pre-University level institution ===
- Duke of York's Royal Military School – Military based secondary school in Dover, Kent; students are influenced to join the forces after education, but have no commitment to do so.

There are also numerous Cadet forces that operate for all branches of the armed forces for children aged 10–20. These are not designed to recruit people into the armed forces but rather are simply Ministry of Defence sponsored youth organisations.

=== Officer training ===
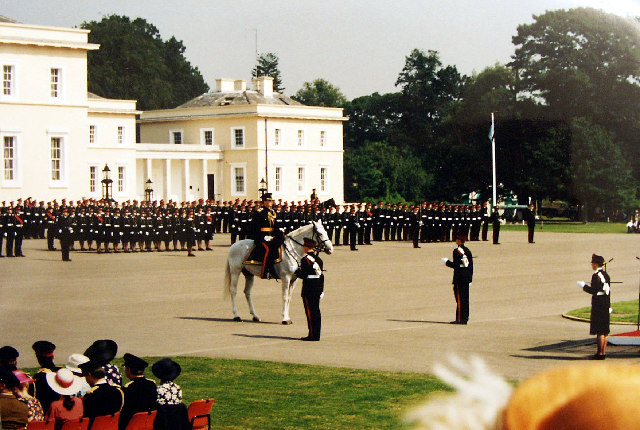
The Passing Out Parade at Royal Military Academy Sandhurst, one of four military academies in the United Kingdom.

There are now four military academies in the United Kingdom. Although the curriculum varies for each service, it is a combination of military and academic study designed to turn young civilians into comprehensively trained military officers.

- Britannia Royal Naval College, HMS Dartmouth
- Commando Training Centre Royal Marines
- Royal Military Academy Sandhurst
- Royal Air Force College Cranwell

Officer Training for the Reserve Forces (Army Reserve, Royal Naval Reserve, RAF Reserves and Royal Marines Reserves) also takes place at the relevant military academies, but under a different curriculum and the courses tend to be concentrated into a much shorter period – a significant amount of the study will be undertaken at the officer cadet's reserve unit.

=== Postgraduate and staff training ===
- Defence Academy of the United Kingdom

- Royal College of Defence Studies (mainly for officers of Colonel/Brigadier or equivalent rank selected as future senior leaders; highly selective)
- Joint Services Command and Staff College (courses for officers from Major to Brigadier or equivalent rank)
- Defence College of Management and Technology
- Armed Forces Chaplaincy Centre
- Advanced Research and Assessment Group
- Conflict Studies Research Centre

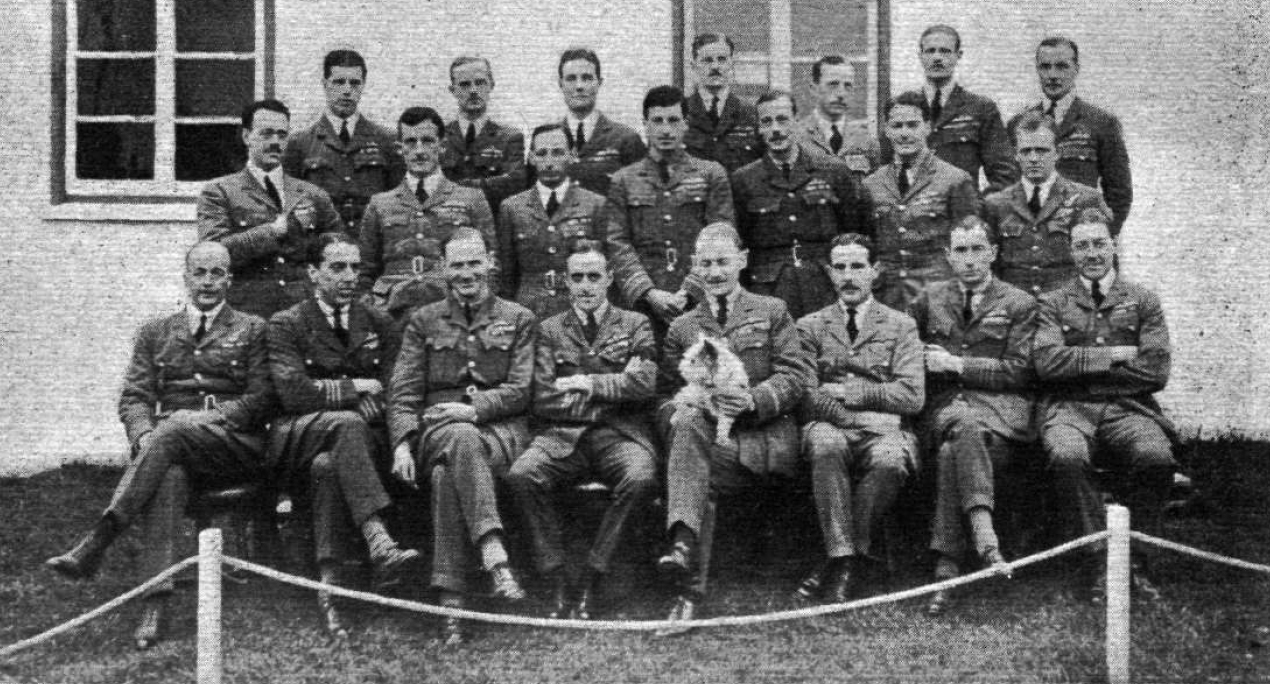
The first RAF staff College course at Andover, 1922. The staff college operated from 1922 to 1970.

== United States ==
=== Introduction ===
In the United States, the term "military academy" does not necessarily mean a government-owned institution run by the armed forces to train its own officers. It may also mean a middle school, high school, or college, whether public or private, which instructs its students in military-style education, discipline and tradition. Students at such civilian institutions can earn a commission in the U.S. military through the successful completion of a Reserve Officer Training Corps program along with their college or university's academic coursework.

- The term military school primarily refers to pre-collegiate secondary-school-level military institutions.
- The term military academy commonly refers to a pre-collegiate, collegiate, and post-collegiate institution, especially the U.S. military-run academies.
- The term US military staff colleges refers to separate graduate schools catering to officers on active duty.

Most state-level military academies maintain both a civilian student body and a traditional corps of cadets. The only exception is the Virginia Military Institute, which remains all-military.

=== Federal service academies ===
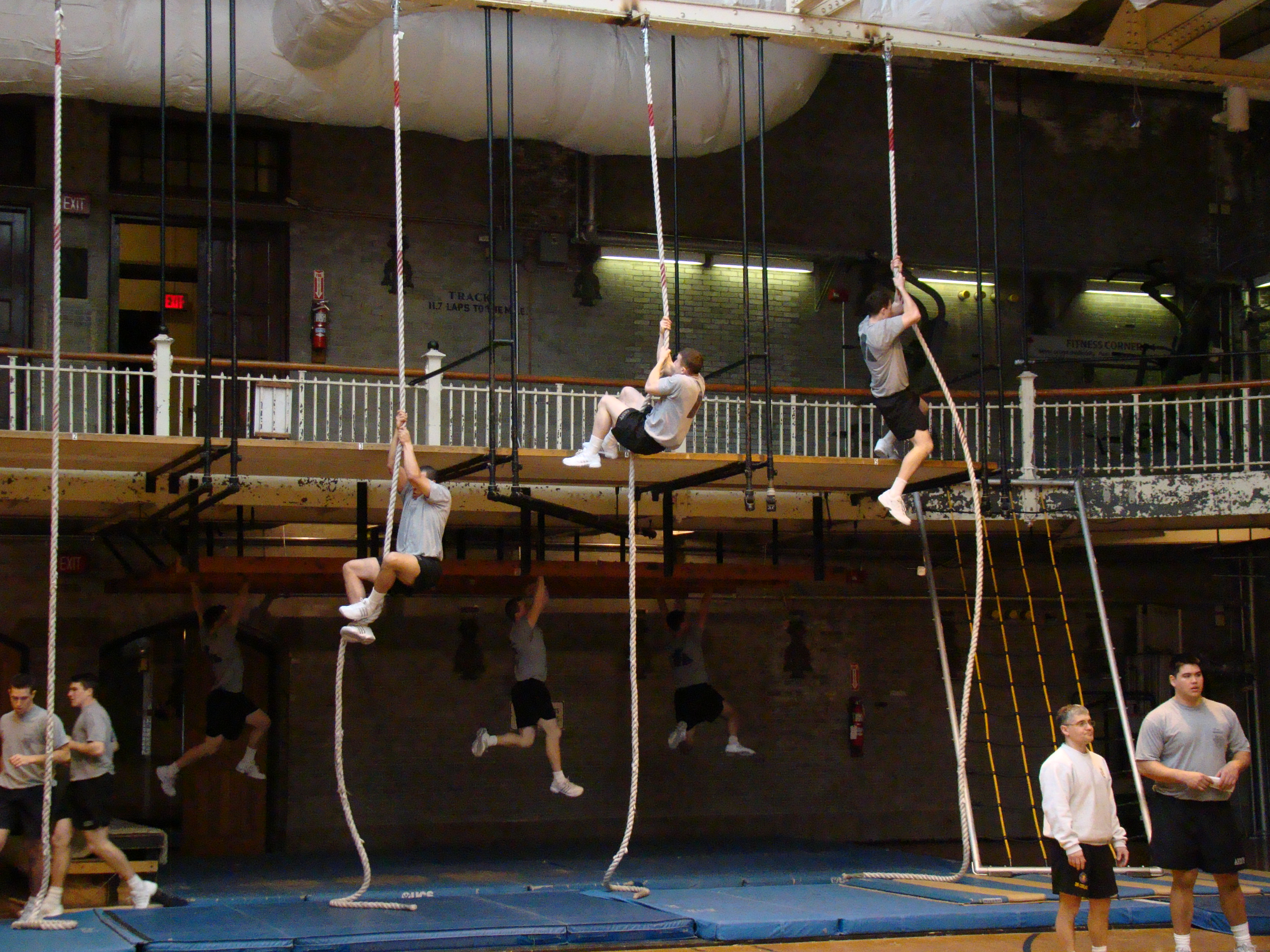
Cadets of the United States Military Academy (USMA) navigate the horizontal ladder and vertical rope obstacle of the Indoor Obstacle Course Test. USMA is one of five federal service academies.

The colleges operated by the U.S. Federal Government, referred to as federal service academies, are:

- United States Military Academy, West Point, New York
- United States Naval Academy, Annapolis, Maryland
- United States Air Force Academy, Colorado Springs, Colorado
- United States Coast Guard Academy, New London, Connecticut
- United States Merchant Marine Academy, Kings Point, New York

=== Post-graduate school ===
- Uniformed Services University of the Health Sciences, Bethesda, Maryland

=== Senior and junior military colleges ===
Although Texas A&M University has transformed into a state university, it still maintains a corps of cadets along with a civilian student body.

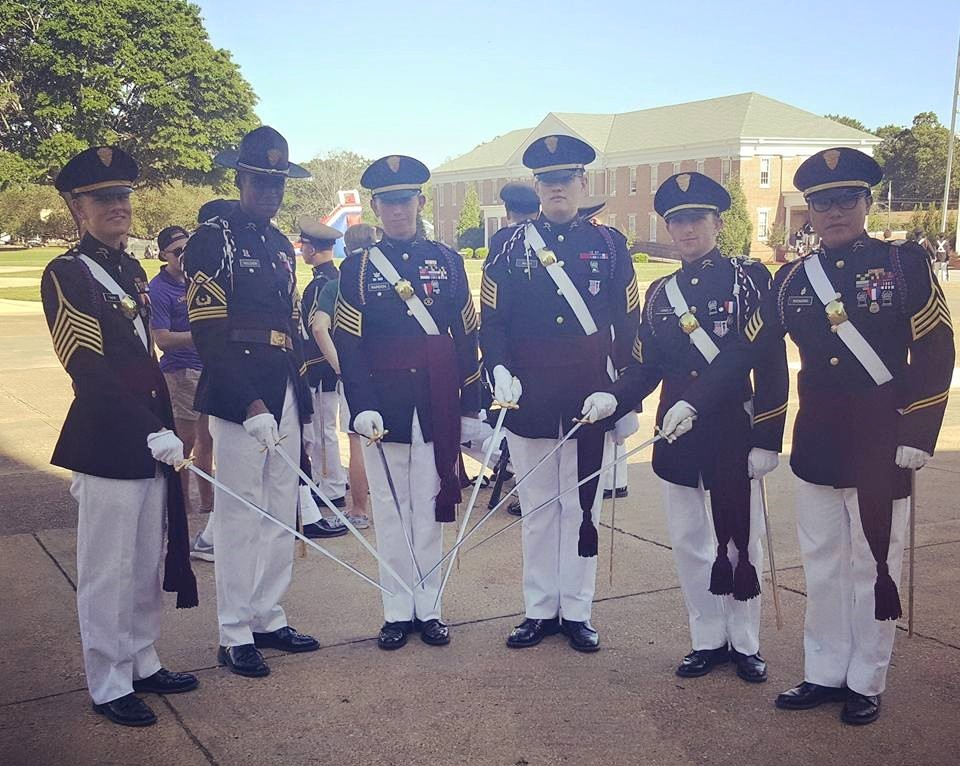
Cadets of Marion Military Institute after the Alumni Weekend parade. The Institute is one of four junior military colleges in the United States.

There is one all-military state-sponsored military academy:

- The Virginia Military Institute (VMI), Lexington, Virginia

In addition, these five institutions that were military colleges at the time of their founding now maintain both a corps of cadets and a civilian student body. Many of these institutions also offer on-line degree programs:

- University of North Georgia, Dahlonega, Georgia — Formed by a 2013 merger with Gainesville State College, its main predecessor institution, last known as North Georgia College & State University, was chartered as a military college. However, when NGCSU was founded in 1873 as North Georgia Agricultural College, it had both a corps and a civilian student body, and was also the state's first coeducational college.
- Norwich University Corps of Cadets. Norwich University, Northfield, Vermont is a private university in Northfield, Vermont. It is the oldest private military college in the United States. The university was founded in 1819 at Norwich, Vermont, as the American Literary, Scientific and Military Academy. It is the oldest of six senior military colleges, and is recognized by the United States Department of Defense as the "Birthplace of ROTC"
- Texas A&M Corps of Cadets, Texas A&M University, College Station, Texas
- The Citadel, The Military College of South Carolina, Charleston, South Carolina
- Virginia Tech Corps of Cadets, Virginia Polytechnic Institute and State University, Blacksburg, Virginia

Along with VMI, these institutions are known as the senior military colleges of the US.

Today four institutions are considered military junior colleges (MJC). These four military schools participate in the Army's two-year Early Commissioning Program, an Army ROTC program where qualified students can earn a commission as a Second Lieutenant after only two years of college. The four military Junior colleges are as follows:

- Georgia Military College, Milledgeville, Georgia
- Marion Military Institute, Marion, Alabama
- New Mexico Military Institute, Roswell, New Mexico
- Valley Forge Military Academy and College, Wayne, Pennsylvania

=== Merchant Marine Academies that have military academy-style operations ===
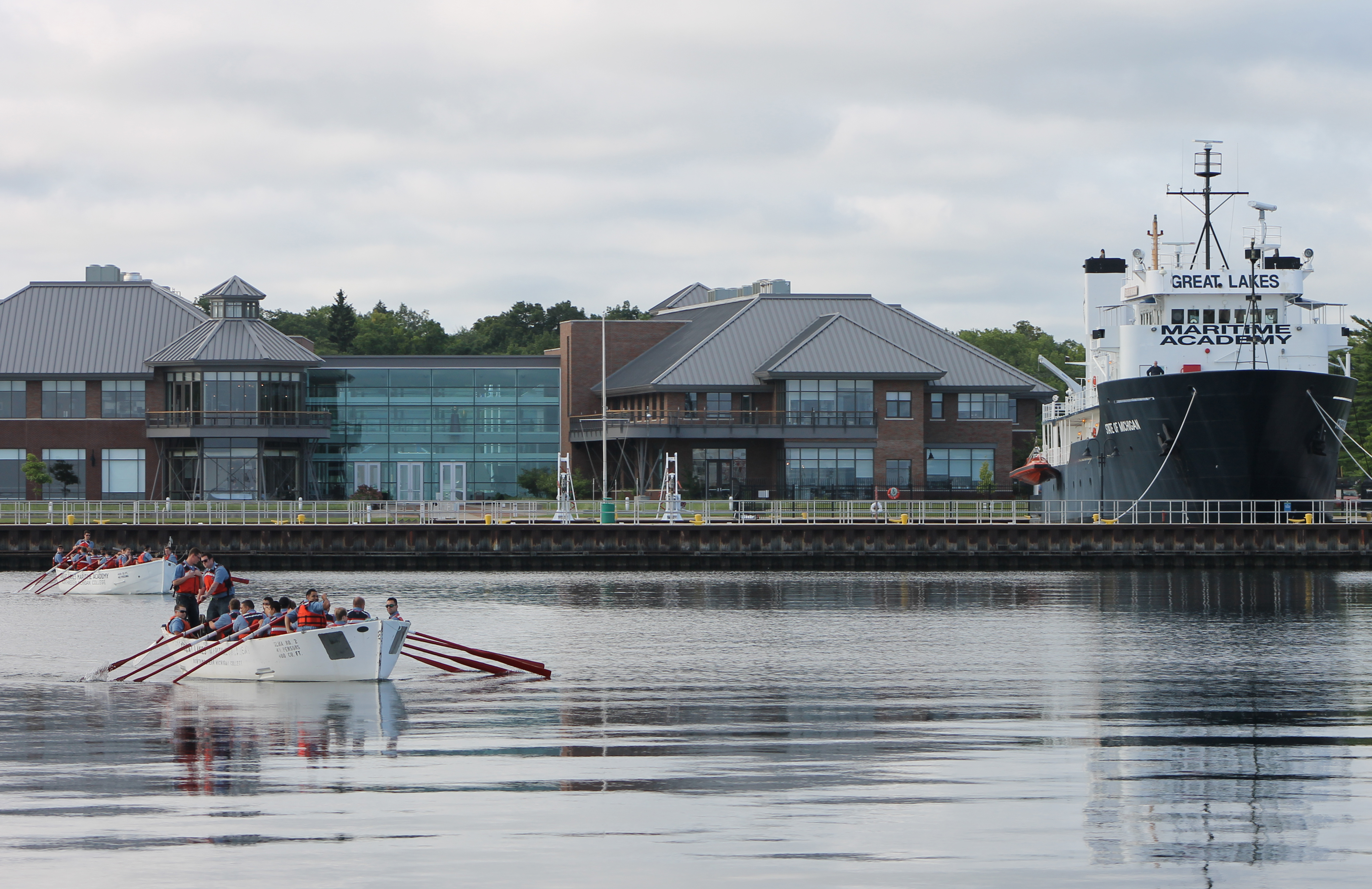
Cadets of the Great Lakes Maritime Academy learning how to row a boat. The institution is one of six military-styled maritime academies in the United States.

There are six state-operated Merchant Marine academies:

- Massachusetts Maritime Academy
- Maine Maritime Academy
- State University of New York Maritime College (part of the State University of New York (SUNY) system)
- Texas A&M Maritime Academy (part of the Texas A&M University System)
- Great Lakes Maritime Academy (a division of Northwestern Michigan College)
- Cal Poly Maritime Academy (part of the California State University system)

These merchant marine academies operate on a military college system. Part of the training that the cadets receive is naval and military in nature. Cadets may apply for Naval Reserve commissions upon obtaining their Merchant Marine Officer's licenses. Most if not all also offer some form of military commissioning program into the active duty US Navy, US Marine Corps, or US Coast Guard.

=== Staff colleges ===
The United States staff colleges, mandated to serve the needs of officers for post-graduate studies and other such graduate institutions as mandated by the Department of Defense are:

==== United States Air Force Air University attached staff colleges ====
- The Air University in Maxwell AFB, Alabama, includes:
  - Squadron Officer College and Squadron Officer School
  - Air Command and Staff College
  - USAF Air War College

==== Staff colleges of the United States Army ====
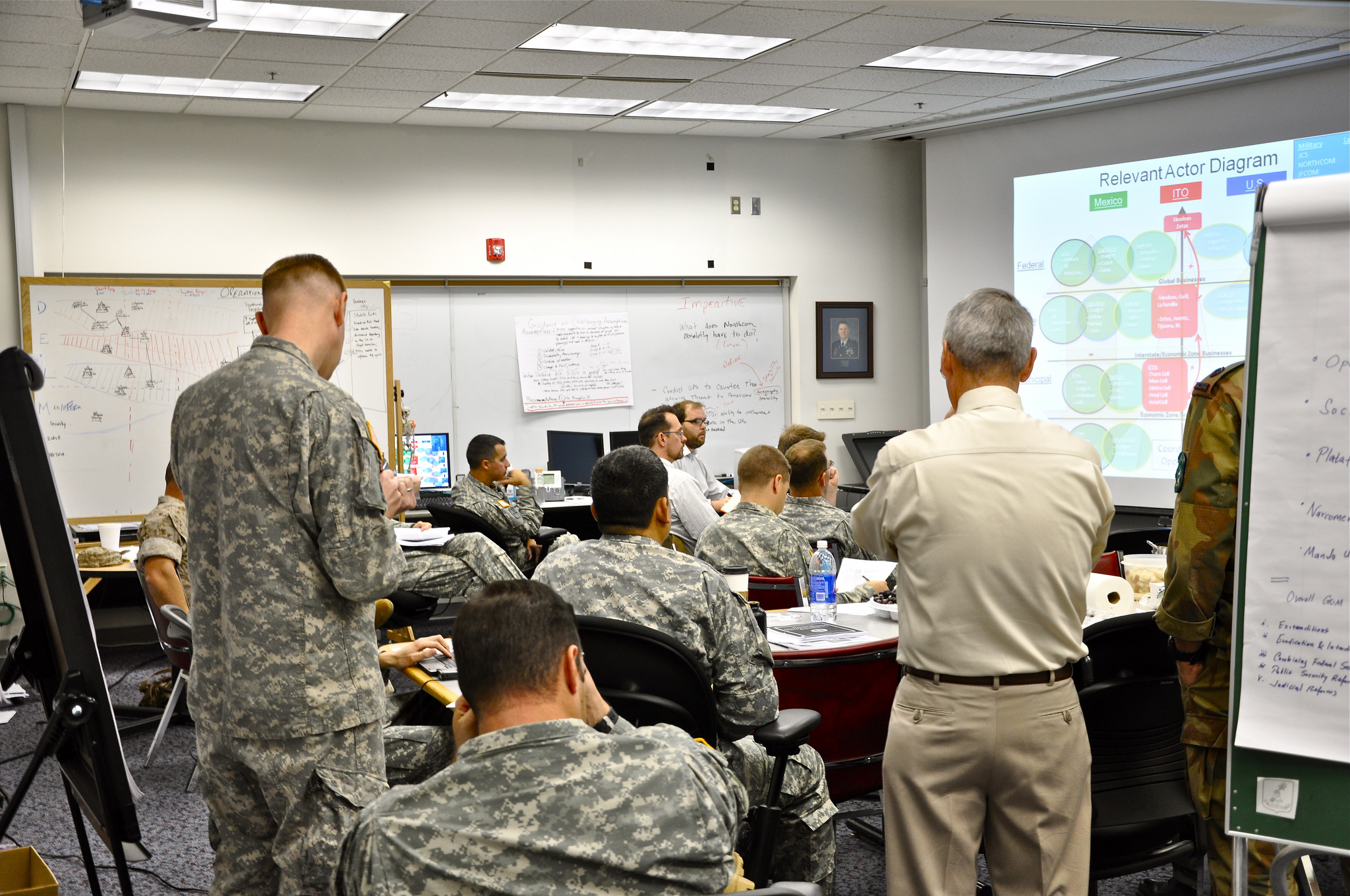
A classroom at the School of Advanced Military Studies, one of four staff colleges of the United States Army

- United States Army Command and General Staff College
- United States Army School of Advanced Military Studies
- United States Army War College

==== Staff colleges of the United States Navy and the United States Marine Corps ====
- Naval War College
- Naval Postgraduate School
- Marine Corps University
- Marine Corps War College

==== Joint Service staff colleges ====
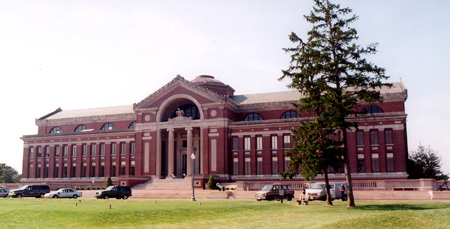
The National War College, a school of the National Defense University, is a multi-service staff college in the United States.

- National Defense University in Washington, D.C., includes:
  - Joint Forces Staff College (Norfolk, Virginia)
  - National War College
  - Dwight D. Eisenhower School for National Security and Resource Strategy
- Defense Acquisition University

=== Other post-graduate colleges operated by the DoD ===
- National Intelligence University (military intelligence)
- The Judge Advocate General's Legal Center and School (legal services training)
- Air Force Judge Advocate General's School (legal services training)
- Naval Justice School (legal services training)

== Uruguay ==
=== Undergraduate officer training academies ===
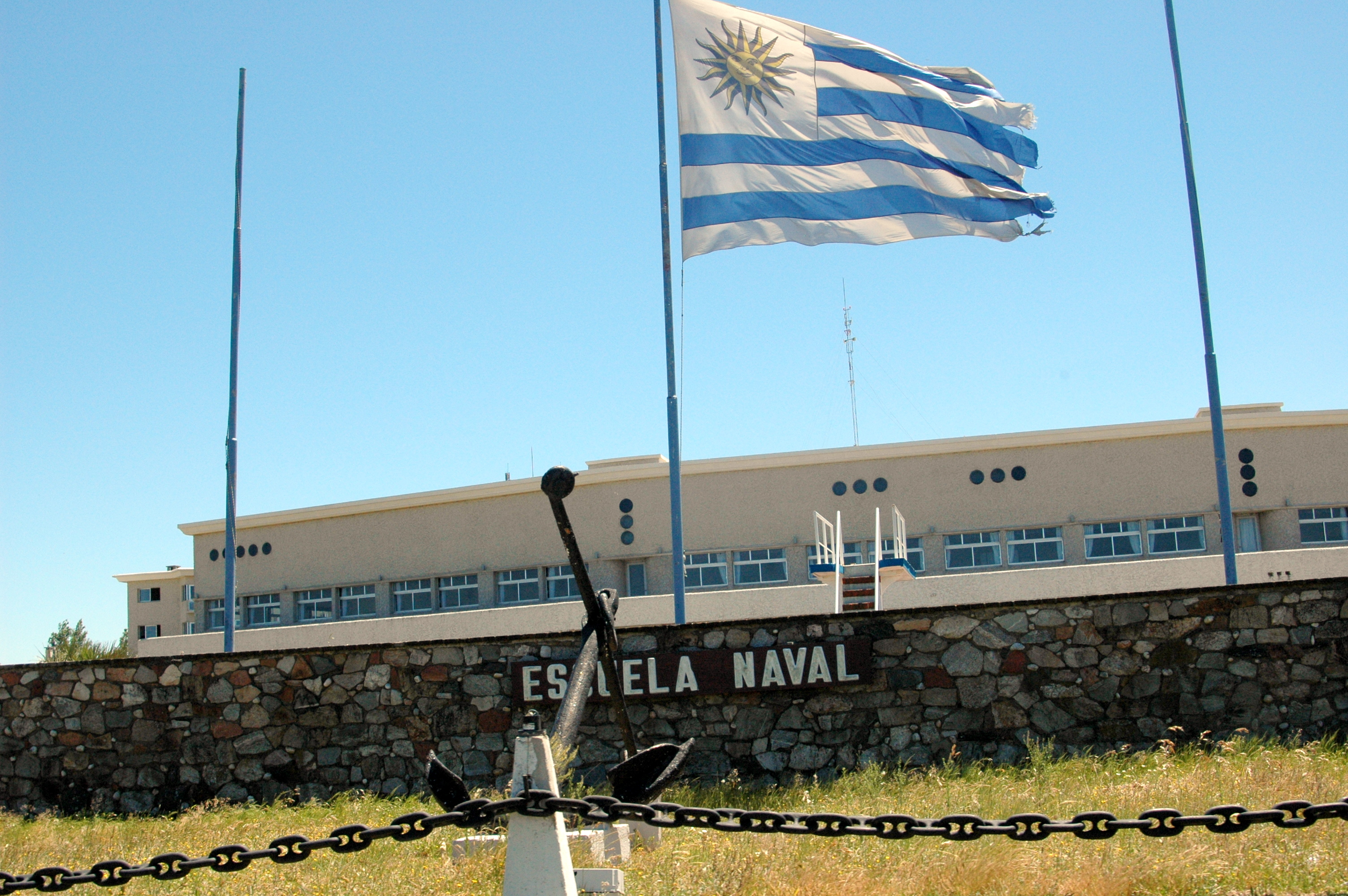
Uruguay Naval Academy

- Uruguay Military School
- Uruguay Naval Academy
- Uruguay Military School of Aeronautics

=== Postgraduate training ===
- Military Institute of Advanced Studies
- Military Institute of Arms and Specialties

== Uzbekistan ==
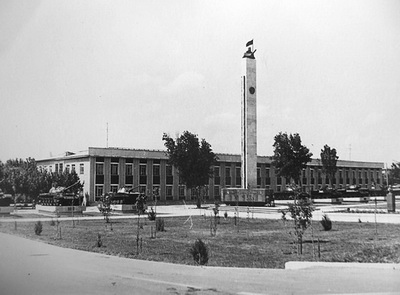
The Tashkent Higher Tank Command School during the soviet period

- Academy of the Armed Forces of Uzbekistan
- Joint Service Officer Training Academy
- Chirchiq Higher Tank Command and Engineering School
- Samarkand Higher Military Automobile Command School
- Higher Military Customs Institute
- Academy of the Ministry of Internal Affairs of Uzbekistan
- Military-Technical Institute of the National Guard of Uzbekistan
- Uzbekistan Air Academy

== Vietnam ==
- National Defense Academy of Vietnam in Hanoi, Vietnam
- Lê Quý Đôn Technical University in Hanoi, Vietnam
- Vietnam Naval Academy in Nha Trang, Khánh Hòa Province, Vietnam

== Zimbabwe ==
- Zimbabwe National Defence University

== See also ==
- Coast guard academy
- Military high school
- List of fictional schools
- List of government-run higher-level national military academies
- Military building
- Military education and training
