= Cadet college =

Type of military educational institution

Cadet College
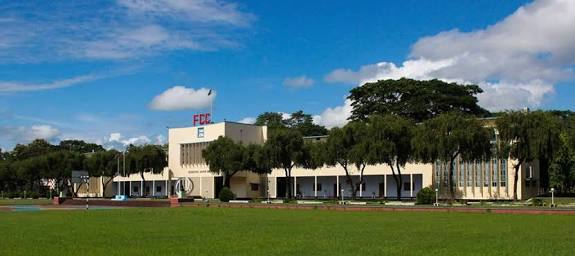
- Campus building of Faujdarhat Cadet College

A cadet college is a type of specialised autonomous residential educational institution administered by the military, providing an all-round liberal education to secondary-level students. The concept has been traced to the public school systems of England during the 19th century. The system of military high schools was formally established from 1922 onwards in the British Raj, later continuing in both Pakistan and East Pakistan (now Bangladesh). The model is considered specific to the Indian subcontinent and does not appear in the civil educational systems of other countries.

== History ==
=== British Raj ===
The system was first established in the pre-partition era in response to a policy of indigenising the officer corps of the British Indian Army. This was in part a reward to the social classes that had provided loyal support during the First World War (1914 to 1918) and which expected greater opportunities for participation at higher levels of the military.

The first institution to be established was the Prince of Wales Royal Indian Military College (RIMC) in March 1922 at Doon Valley, then in Punjab Province (now the Indian state of Uttarakhand). Its establishment followed difficulties encountered by the first batch of South Asian cadets sent directly to the Royal Military Academy Sandhurst in England.

In 1922, the British Indian Army also established the King George Royal Indian Military Schools (KGRIMS) in Punjab Province at Jalandhar Cantonment, with an extension campus at Jhelum, to provide education to the sons of enlisted men and other ranks of the army. KGRIMS campuses opened between 1925 and 1930 at Jullundhar, Jhelum and Ajmer, with two further campuses later established at Belgaum and Bangalore.

=== Pakistan after independence ===
Following partition in August 1947, the RIMC passed to the Indian Republic as the Rashtriya Indian Military College. India did not establish cadet colleges for civilian students after independence. The Jhelum campus of KGRIMS was upgraded to college status and became Military College Jhelum.

The first cadet college established by the newly formed Pakistan Army was the Punjab Cadet College at Hasanabdal, Attock District, Punjab, in 1954. As of 1952, it was the only cadet college in the country; the second, Cadet College Petaro, was established in Jamshoro in 1957. The expansion of the Pakistan armed forces from the 1960s onwards broadened the social base of the officer corps and led to a corresponding increase in the number of cadet colleges across the country. These institutions serve as feeder schools for the officer training academies of the Pakistan Army, Navy and Air Force.

From the late 1990s, a number of private cadet colleges were also established to provide pre-military academic training. These institutions are overseen by the Joint Staff Headquarters (JSHQ) of the Joint Chiefs of Staff Committee.

As of 2024, approximately 40 cadet colleges operate in Pakistan, administered by federal or provincial governments. Of these, only three — around eight per cent — admit female students.

==== Notable expansions ====
The expansion of the Pakistan armed forces from the 1960s onwards broadened the social base of the officer corps and led to a corresponding increase in the number of cadet colleges across the country. These institutions serve as feeder schools for the officer training academies of the Pakistan Army, Navy and Air Force.

Cadet colleges in Pakistan are found across multiple provinces, including in Khyber Pakhtunkhwa, where institutions include Cadet College Kohat, Garrison Cadet College Kohat, FS Cadet College Warsak, Colonel Sher Khan Cadet College Swabi, Cadet College Batrasi, Cadet College Wana, Cadet College Spinkai and Cadet College Razmak.

A survey of eight cadet colleges in Khyber Pakhtunkhwa found that students in all but one achieved mean scores above 80 per cent at secondary level, with most scoring above 87 per cent.

=== East Pakistan and Bangladesh ===
The first cadet college in East Pakistan was established on 28 April 1958 at Chittagong as Faujdarhat Cadet College. Further cadet colleges were subsequently established at Jhenaidah, Rajshahi, Mirzapur, Rangpur, Mymensingh, Sylhet, Barisal, Comilla, Feni and Joypurhat. No additional cadet colleges were founded after 1964 as the political environment became increasingly unstable. Following the Bangladesh Liberation War and the formation of Bangladesh, the first Education Commission, chaired by Qudrat-e-Khuda, recommended the dismantling of the cadet colleges on the grounds of their discriminatory standing. Bangladesh subsequently retained and expanded the cadet college system.

Following the Cadet College (Amendment) Ordinance of 1979, the overall administration of all cadet colleges in Bangladesh passed to the direct control of an Adjutant General of the Bangladesh Army. As of 2017, Bangladesh had twelve cadet colleges: nine for boys and three for girls. The three girls' cadet colleges are Mymensingh Girls' Cadet College (established 1983), Feni Girls' Cadet College (established 2006) and Joypurhat Girls' Cadet College (established 2006). The medium of instruction throughout the Bangladesh cadet college system is English.

== Aims and curriculum ==
Cadet colleges provide education to students from class VII to class XII, combining academic study with physical, ethical, social and leadership development. Beyond classroom instruction, emphasis is placed on co-curricular and extracurricular programmes, sports, cultural activities, psychological and moral training, and military discipline. The institutions operate as residential boarding schools, and cadets are admitted through nationwide entrance examinations.

== See also ==
- List of cadet colleges in Pakistan
- List of cadet colleges in Bangladesh
- Military College Jhelum
- Cadet College Fateh Jang
- Dholpur Military School
- Sainik School
