= List of cadet colleges in Bangladesh =

Armed Forces Division; Governing Body of Cadet Colleges; Adjutant General Branch; AHQ Dhaka Cantonment
- Incumbent; Major General Md Hakimuzzaman
- Bangladesh Armed Forces
- Type: Governing Body of Cadet Colleges
- Appointer: Bangladesh Army
- Term length: No fixed term
- Website: cadetcollege.army.mil.bd

A cadet college is a residential high school and college established in Bangladesh on the model of English public schools. It was put under the direct management and supervision of the armed forces of the country and military education was made compulsory in it. After the liberation of Bangladesh, The Cadet Colleges Order (PO 89) of 1972 issued guidelines for restructuring the councils and governing bodies of the cadet colleges. According to new provisions, the Education Minister became the ex-officio chairman of the council and the divisional commissioner the chairman of the governing body. The Cadet College Act 1973 brought some changes in the provisions. The two management bodies of the cadet colleges were further restructured and were placed under direct control of the Ministry of Defence. There have been periodic changes in the management structure because of changes in the government, but the basic principles have so far remained undisturbed. At present, the Adjutant General of the Bangladesh Army acts as the chairman of the governing bodies of all cadet colleges and the Defense Secretary is the highest authority in all matters relating to their funding and operation.

No.	Name	Location	Division	Area (acre)	Established
01	Faujdarhat Cadet College	Faujdarhat, Chattogram	Chattogram	185	1958
02	Jhenaidah Cadet College	Jhenaidah	Khulna	103	1963
03	Mirzapur Cadet College	Mirzapur, Tangail	Dhaka	95	1963
04	Rajshahi Cadet College	Sardah, Rajshahi	Rajshahi	110	1965
05	Sylhet Cadet College	Sylhet	Sylhet	52.37	1978
06	Rangpur Cadet College	Ashratpur (Park more), Rangpur	Rangpur	37	1979
07	Barisal Cadet College	Rahmatpur, Barisal	Barisal	50	1981
08	Pabna Cadet College	Pabna	Rajshahi	38	1981
09	Mymensingh Girls Cadet College	Mymensingh	Mymensingh	23	1983
10	Comilla Cadet College	Kotbari, Cumilla	Chattogram	52	1983
11	Feni Girls Cadet College	Feni	Chattogram	49.5	2006
12	Joypurhat Girls Cadet College	Joypurhat	Rajshahi	57	2006

== See also ==
- Education in Bangladesh
