= Sylhet Cadet College =

Military high school in Bangladesh

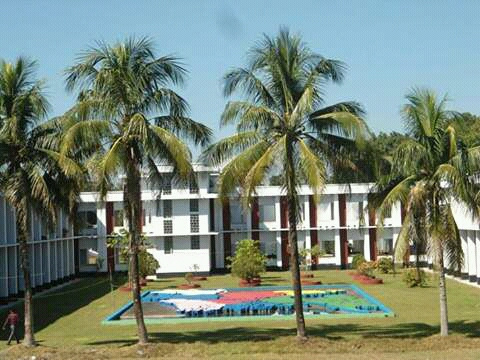
- Photo of Sylhet Cadet College

Location
- Airport Road, Sylhet; Sylhet, Bangladesh, 3101; 24.94618°N 91.87108°E

Information
- Motto: Followers Of Light (বাংলা: আলোকের অভিসারী)
- Established: June 15, 1979; 46 years ago
- School board: Board of Intermediate and Secondary Education, Sylhet
- Principal: Dr. A F M Murtahan Billah, PhD
- Adjutant: Major Md. Rawshan Iqbal, Psc, Inf
- Language: English
- Area: 52 acres (210,000 m^{2})
- Color: Purple
- Demonym: SCCian
- First Principal: Lieutenant Colonel Md. Ziauddin
- EIIN: 130454
- Website: scc.army.mil.bd

Sylhet Cadet College (Bengali: সিলেট ক্যাডেট কলেজ) is a military high school for boys (Grades VII–XII) located in Sylhet City, east of Osmani Airport Road, next to Parjatan Hotel in Sylhet, Bangladesh.

== History ==
When Bangladesh (then East Pakistan) was part of Pakistan, the Pakistan Army established several cadet colleges in West Pakistan (now Pakistan) as well as four cadet colleges in East Pakistan (now Bangladesh), modeled after British public schools. After the Bangladesh War of Independence, the Bangladesh Army established eight more cadet colleges, including Mymensingh Girls Cadet College, Joypurhat Girls Cadet College, and Feni Girls Cadet College, specifically for girls. Sylhet Cadet College was the first cadet college established after Bangladesh Liberation War in 1971.

Originally founded in 1969 as a model school during Pakistan's administration, it was converted to a model college in 1974. In 1978, the Bangladesh Army transformed this model college into a cadet college. In 1979, an admission test was held to select students from the model college to join the newly modified cadet college. The first, second, and third batches of the new cadet college were from the model college, and that same year, the fourth batch was admitted as fresh cadets. The first batch graduated in 1982, while the first intake, or fourth batch, graduated in 1985. Since then, annual admission tests have been conducted to admit new cadets to the seventh grade.

In 2019, when 99.53% students of cadet colleges in Bangladesh obtained GPA-5 in SSC exams, 51 students from Sylhet Cadet College were among those securing GPA-5.

== Infrastructure ==
=== Dining hall ===
A large dining hall for the cadets, located next to the house, is named the Birsrestho Matiur Rahman Dining Hall.

=== Hospital ===
Birsrestho Nur Mohammad Hospital is situated in the southeastern corner of the college, adjacent to the athletics ground. It is a single-story building where cadets and other members of the college can report in case of illness or injury. A Captain or Major of the Bangladesh Army is typically in charge of the hospital.

=== Auditorium ===
A large auditorium, named Birshrestha Mustafa, is located next to the academic block. All competitions, cultural shows, and assemblies are held here.

== Houses ==
The three houses are located in the same building. Titumir House is on the ground floor, Hazrat Shahjalal (R) House on the first floor, and Surma House on the second floor. Each house has 34 rooms divided across three blocks, with 31 rooms designated for cadet accommodation. The remaining rooms are allocated as the House Office, House Store, and Duty Master's Room for Titumir House, and as a mobile room for the other two houses.

House	Named after	Motto	Logo	Colour	Floor
Hazrat Shahjalal (R.) House	Shah Jalal	অন্ধকার হতে বেরিয়ে এসো (Come out from darkness)	Pigeon	Red	
Titumir House	Mir Nisar Ali Titumir	আমরা আত্মসমর্পণ জানি না (We don't know how to surrender)	Lion	Blue	
Surma House	Surma River	শিক্ষা, শান্তি, শক্তি (Education, Peace, Strength)	Royal Bengal Tiger	Green	

== Academics ==
Sylhet Cadet College has been providing excellent academic support to cadets, preparing them for service to the nation. In recent years, SCC achieved outstanding results in the Secondary School Certificate (SSC) examinations, notably in 2007 (28th batch) and 2010 (31st batch), with all students achieving a GPA of 5.00. The academic performance of SCC has consistently improved, and its results have consistently ranked among the best in the Sylhet Education Board.

== Administration ==
The administration of the college is led by the Principal (a Colonel or equivalent defense official, or an Associate Professor of the Cadet College), Vice Principal (an Associate Professor of the Cadet College), Adjutant (a Major or equivalent defense official), Medical Officer (a Captain or Major or equivalent defense official), and three House Masters (Associate Professors of the Cadet College).

Current Administration:

- Principal: Dr. AFM Murtahan Billah
- Vice Principal : Faruk Ahmed Khan
- Adjutant: Major Rahat
- Medical Officer: Captain Riyadh Bin Alam

== See also ==
- List of Cadet Colleges in Bangladesh
- Cadet college
