= Cadet College Club Limited =

For alumni of Bangladeshi cadet colledges

- Abbreviation: CCCL
- Formation: 14 April 2003
- Headquarters: Plot 2, Road 203A, Sector 12, Purbachal New Town, Rupganj Upazila, Narayanganj, Bangladesh
- Coordinates: 23.8402°N 90.4866°E
- Region served: Bangladesh
- President: Tariq Abul Ala
- Director (Administration and Services): Ashraf Hussain
- Director (Finance & Accounts): Kazi Masum Hossain
- Director (Women and Children affairs).: Zinnat-un-Nahar (Seema)
- Main organ: Board of Directors
- Website: www.cccl.com.bd

Cadet College Club Limited or CCCL is a pan-national club for the alumni of all cadet colleges in Bangladesh and is located in Purbachal New Town, Narayanganj. Tariq Abul Ala is the president and Ashraf Hussain is the Director (Administration and Services)

The club was formed in 2003 with the alumni from 10 cadet colleges of Bangladesh (former East Pakistan) and Bengali alumni of military schools situated in the then West Pakistan. Before relocating to its current space, it was in Gulshan, Dhaka.
