= Military high school =

Type of high school

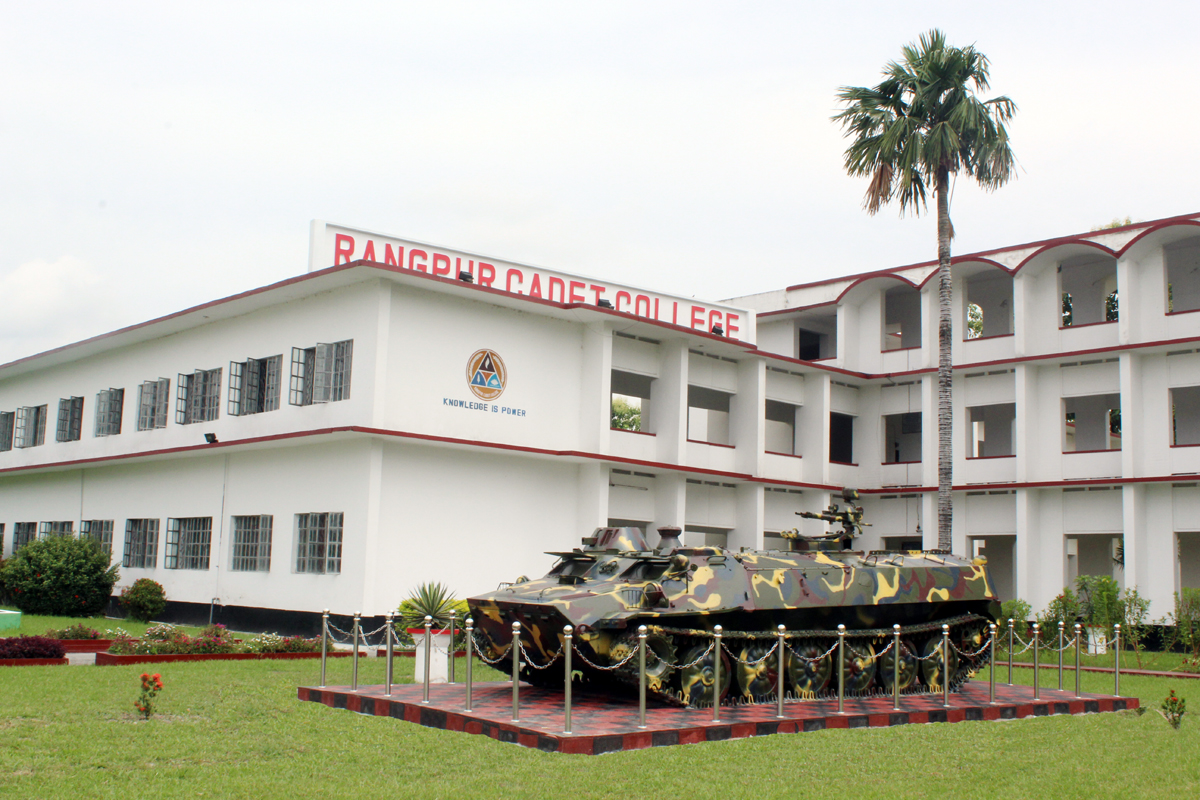
Rangpur Cadet College in Rangpur, Bangladesh

Military high school is a type of high school that includes secondary education along with military cadet education. They are found in several countries and offer a regular high school education but with an extra military training curriculum. For example, cadets must rise early and do physical training to be followed by games in the afternoon. However, in the same way as a high or secondary school, they have academic classes after breakfast. In the evening, there may be self-study classes. As a part of a military institute, seniority is essential, and the commands of seniors must be obeyed by juniors. The grade works as the rank of the cadets. All cadets from the same batch are considered to be of the same rank. However, in higher grades, prefects are selected to lead the regular cadets.

== List ==
=== Bangladesh ===
- Joypurhat Girls Cadet College
- Feni Girls Cadet College
- Comilla Cadet College
- Mymensingh Girls Cadet College
- Pabna Cadet College
- Barisal Cadet College
- Rangpur Cadet College
- Sylhet Cadet College
- Rajshahi Cadet College
- Mirzapur Cadet College
- Jhenaidah Cadet College
- Faujdarhat Cadet College

=== Brazil ===
- Colégio Militar de Belém (CMBel) (Military High School of Belém)
- Colégio Militar de Belo Horizonte (CMBH) (Military High School of Belo Horizonte)
- Colégio Militar de Brasília (CMB) (Military High School of Brasília)
- Colégio Militar de Campo Grande (CMCG) (Military High School of Campo Grande)
- Colégio Militar de Curitiba (CMC) (Military High School of Curitiba)
- Colégio Militar de Fortaleza (CMF) (Military High School of Fortaleza)
- Colégio Militar de Juiz de Fora (CMJF) (Military High School of Juiz de Fora)
- Colégio Militar de Manaus (CMM) (Military High School of Manaus)
- Colégio Militar de Porto Alegre (CMPA) (Military High School of Porto Alegre)
- Colégio Militar do Recife (CMR) (Military High School of Recife)
- Colégio Militar do Rio de Janeiro (CMRJ) (Military High School of Rio de Janeiro)
- Colégio Militar de Salvador (CMS) (Military High School of Salvador)
- Colégio Militar de Santa Maria (CMSM) (Military High School of Santa Maria)
- Colégio Militar de São Paulo (CMSP) (Military High School of São Paulo)
- Colégio Naval (CN) (Naval High School)
- Escola Preparatória de Cadetes do Ar (EPCAR) (Air Cadets Preparatory School)

=== Bulgaria ===
- Georgi Benkovski Bulgarian Air Force Academy
- Georgi Rakovski Military Academy
- Military Medical Academy
- Nikola Vaptsarov Naval Academy
- Vasil Levski National Military University

=== Canada ===
- Robert Land Academy

=== India ===
- Sainik Schools

=== Indonesia ===
- Taruna Nusantara, Magelang
- Krida Nusantara, Bandung
- Astha Hannas, Subang
- Pelita Nusantara, Bandung
- Pradita Dirgantara, Boyolali
- Kartika III-I, Ambarawa
- Taruna Nala, Malang
- Taruna Brawijaya, Kediri
- Taruna Angkasa, Madiun
- Taruna Madani, Bangil

=== Italy ===
- Scuola militare Nunziatella
- Scuola navale militare “Francesco Morosini”
- Scuola militare Teuliè
- Scuola aeronautica militare “Giulio Douhet”

=== Malaysia ===
- The Royal Military College, Sungai Besi

=== Nigeria ===
- Air Force Military School, Jos, Nigeria
- Nigerian Navy Secondary School, Abeokuta, Ogun State
- Nigerian Navy Secondary School, Ojo, Lagos
- Nigerian Military School, Zaria
- Command Secondary Schools

=== Pakistan ===
- Cadet College Hasan Abdal
- Cadet College Fateh Jang
- Cadet College Kohat
- Cadet College Larkana
- Cadet College Mastung
- Cadet College Palandri
- Cadet College Petaro
- Cadet College Razmak
- Cadet College Sanghar
- Cadet College Skardu
- Garrison Cadet College Kohat
- Military College Jhelum
- Military College Sui
- Military College Murree
- Pakistan Steel Cadet College
- WAPDA Cadet College Tarbela

=== Peru ===
- Leoncio Prado Military Academy

=== Romania ===
- Military High School Alexandru Ioan Cuza
- Military High School Dimitrie Cantemir
- Military High School Mihai Viteazu
- Military High School Stefan cel Mare
- Military High School Tudor Vladimirescu

=== Serbia ===
- Military High School Belgrade
- Technical Military High School "1300 Corporals"

=== Thailand ===
- Armed Forces Academies Preparatory School

=== Turkey ===
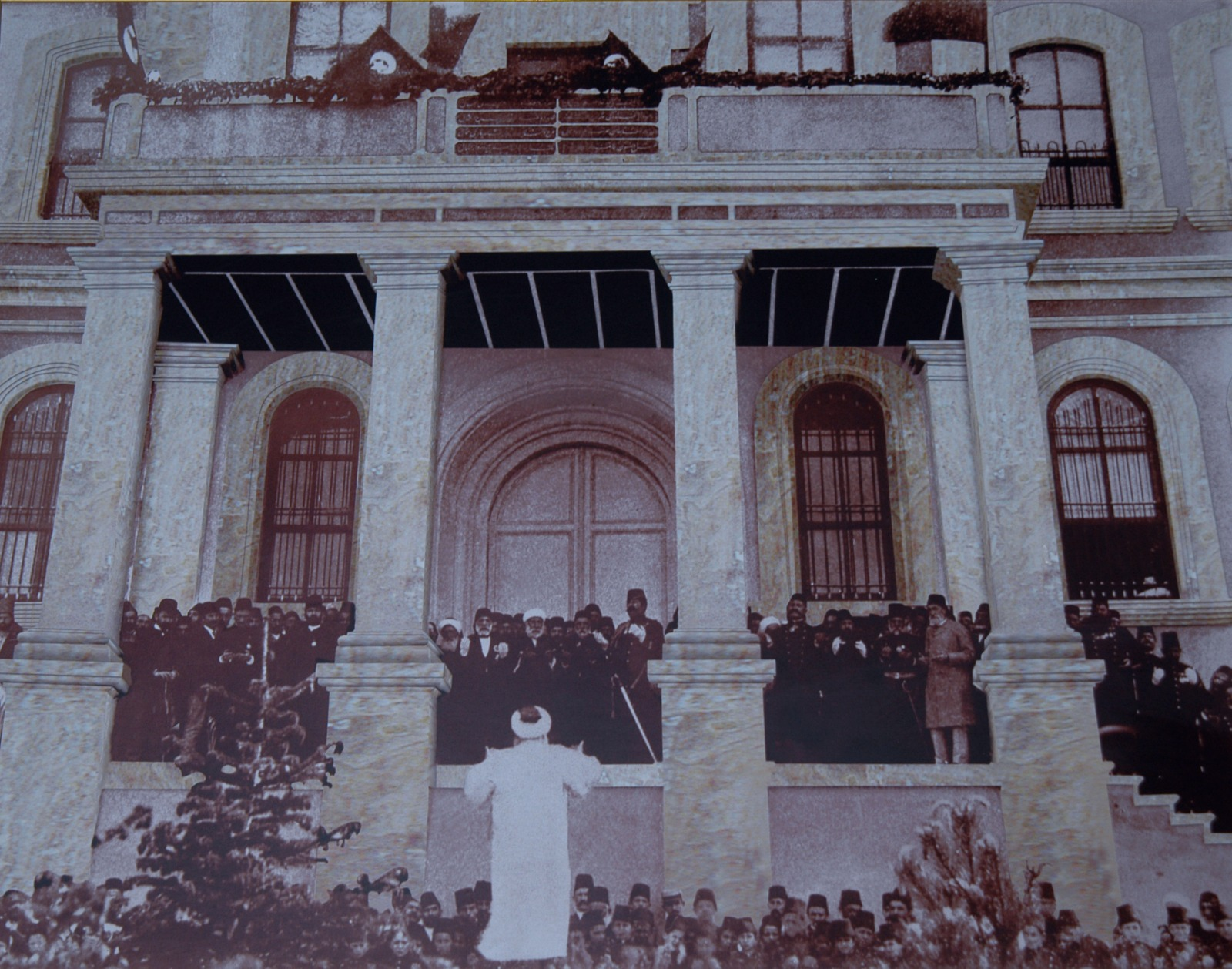
Opening ceremony of Işıklar Military High School, 1892

All military high schools were shut down on 31 July 2016, following the 2016 Turkish coup d'état attempt.

- Heybeliada Military High School
- Isiklar Military High School
- Kuleli Military High School
- Maltepe Military High School

=== United Arab Emirates ===
- The Military High School, Al-Ain

=== United States ===
- Admiral Farragut Academy
- Benedictine Military School
- Carson Long Military Academy (Permanently closed)
- Carver Military Academy
- Fork Union Military Academy
- Hargrave Military Academy
- Marine Military Academy
- Massanutten Military Academy
- Missouri Military Academy
- New York Military Academy
- New Mexico Military Institute
- Riverside Military Academy
- St. John's Northwestern Military Academy

=== Uruguay ===
- Liceo Militar General Artigas

== See also ==
- Military junior college
