= Feni Girls' Cadet College =

Military high school in Bangladesh

- ফেনী গার্লস ক্যাডেট কলেজ
- Motto: মহৎ শিক্ষা উত্তম জীবন
- Motto in English: Noble Education Decent Life
- Established: 7 June 2006; 20 years ago
- Affiliations: Board of Intermediate and Secondary Education, Cumilla
- Principal: Colonel S. M. Foysol, PSC
- Adjutant: Lieutenant Commander Farzana Sarkar Tanna, BN
- Location: Feni, 3900, Bangladesh; 23.030°N 91.396°E
- Campus: 49.5 acres (200,000 m^{2})
- Language: English
- Demonym: FGCCIAN
- First Principal: Faizul Hasan
- Colors: Crystal green
- Website: fgcc.army.mil.bd
- Location in Bangladesh

Feni Girls' Cadet College (Bengali: ফেনী গার্লস ক্যাডেট কলেজ), is a military high school for girls, located in Feni Sadar Upazila, Bangladesh. Cadet colleges are autonomous residential institutions that impart an all round education to the young learners at the secondary and higher secondary level. The colleges are under the auspices of the Ministry of Defence and function under the direct supervision of the Adjutant General of the Bangladesh Army.

== History ==
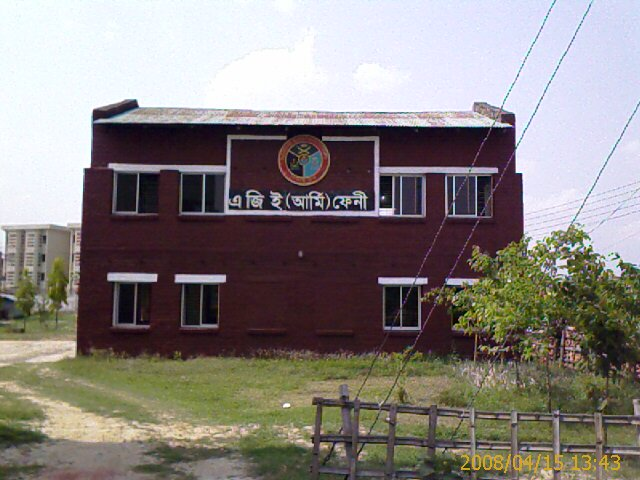
Only surviving building from World War II Airfield, used as site office by MES (Military Engineer Services)

Mymensingh Girls' Cadet College was established in 1984 as the first cadet college for girls in Bangladesh alongside the nine existing cadet colleges for boys. Thereafter, the desire to increase the number of places for girls to promote more equal access to such an education combined with the introduction of commissioning female officers into the Defense Services in 2002 added more impetus to the issue. Finally, the government decided to establish two girls' cadet colleges at Feni and Joypurhat. A portion of an abandoned American airfield (constructed in 1942 during World War II) was chosen as the site for Feni Girls' Cadet College. The MES (Military Engineer Services) started work on the project on 29 June 2004. The student (called a cadet) selection procedure started in December 2005 and a nationwide competitive examination held.

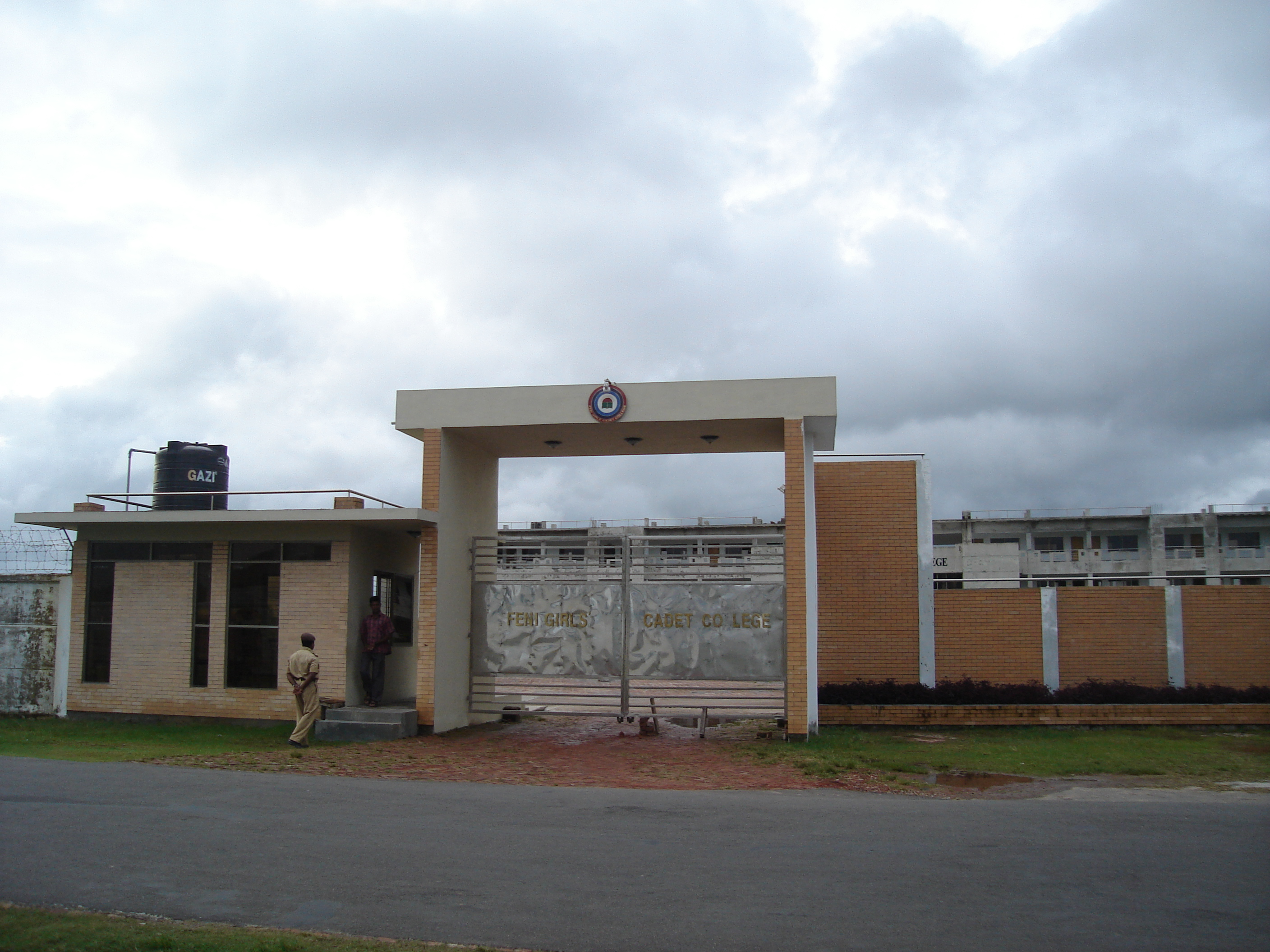
College Gate

Initially, only a skeleton staff of military and civilian backgrounds were transferred from other cadet colleges while the recruitment process was undertaken. The college received the first batch of newly recruited employees in April 2006. The college opened for teaching on 15 April 2006 with 100 students (cadets), fifty of each from classes VIII and VII. On 7 June 2006 the then Prime Minister Khaleda Zia formally opened the college. Ministers, chiefs of three services, senior military and civil officers, elites, college staff and cadets were present. The college started running with basic buildings and services as work continued on enlarging the campus.

== Location ==
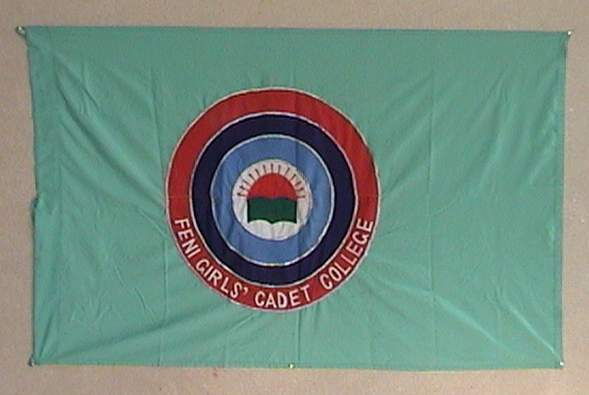
College Flag

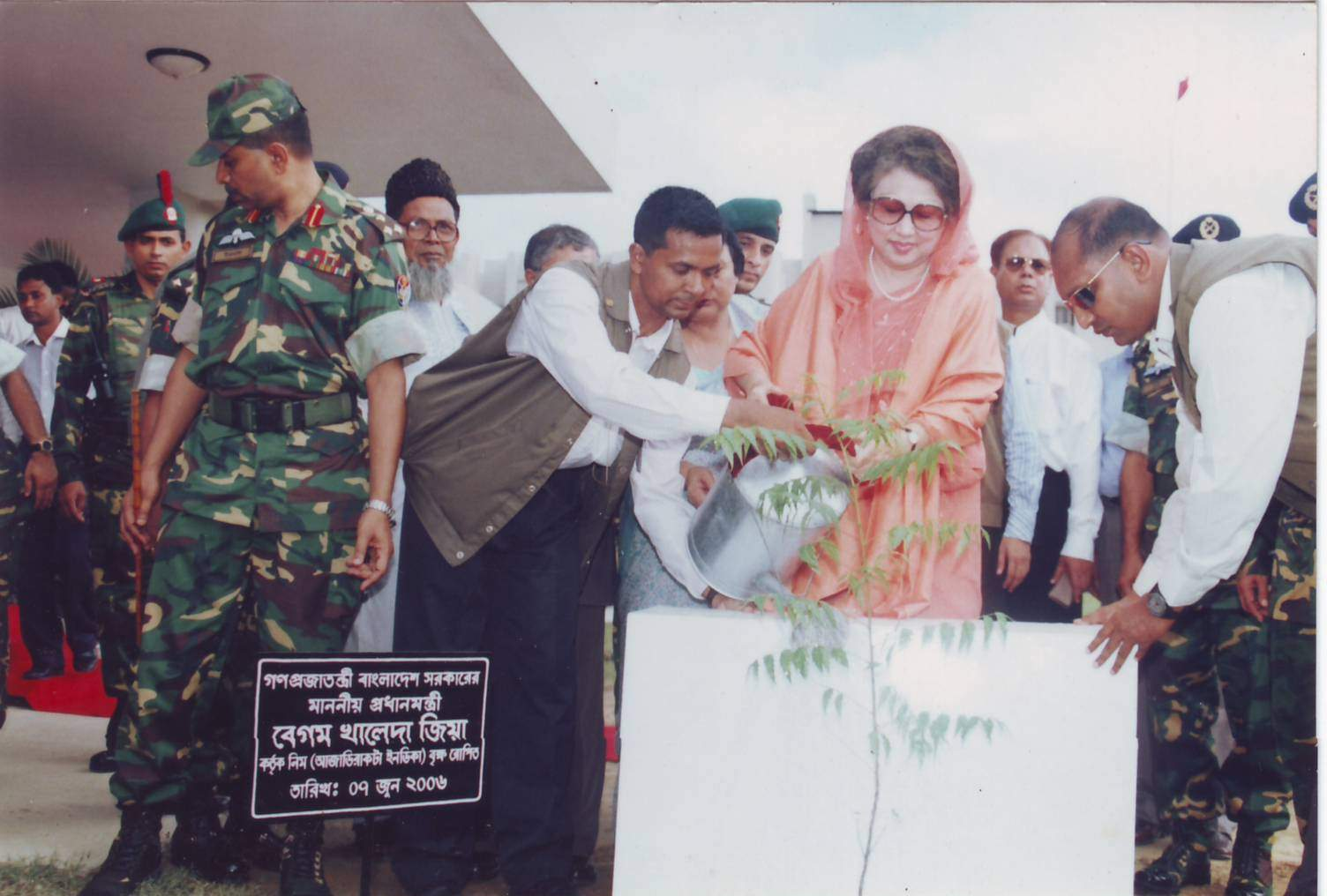
Plantation of sapling by Ex Prime Minister Begum Khaleda Zia

The college is located at the Old Airport Area just beside Feni town. The Feni-Chhagalnaiya highway passes through the college dividing the campus in half. The main highway of Bangladesh, Dhaka-Chattogram Inter-district highway passes through Feni. Buses usually take 3–4 hours to travel on 165 km highway from Dhaka and about 2.5 hours from Chattogram. Feni is also accessible by train.

== Houses ==
House	Named after	Motto	Symbol	Colours blue
Khadiza House	Hazrat Khadijah	Faith Honesty Prosperity	candle	blue
Ayesha House	Hazrat Aisha	Intellect be advanced	lekhoni (pen)	green
Fatima House	Hazrat Fatimah	Enlightened Life For ever	Sun	red

== Administration ==
=== Central administration ===
Cadet Colleges function under the Ministry of Defence. The Defence Secretary is the chairman of the Cadet College Governing Council while the Adjutant General, Bangladesh Army is the chairman of the Cadet College Governing Body. The Cadet College Section at the Adjutant General's Branch at Army Headquarters directly controls all the Cadet Colleges.

=== College administration ===
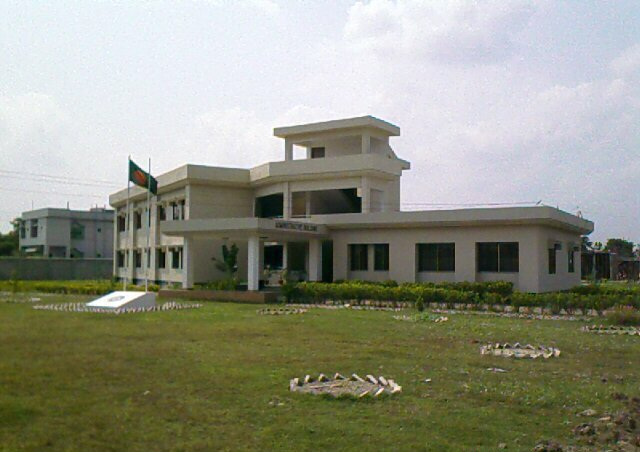
Administrative Building

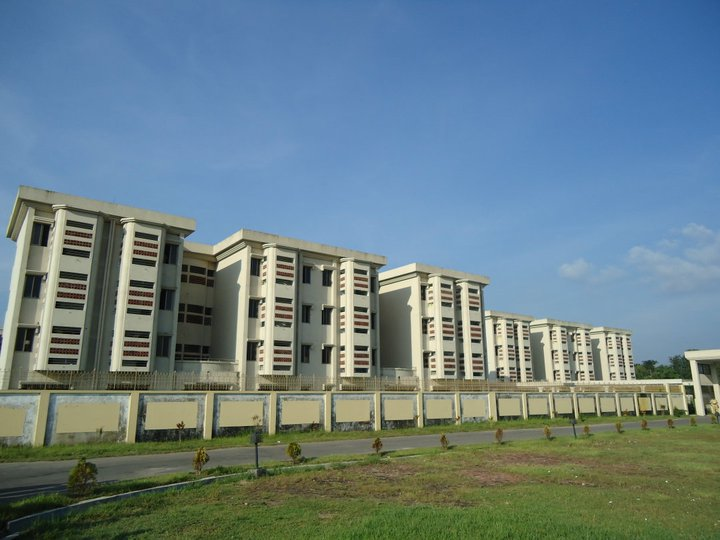
Cadets' House Buildings

The principal of the college may be either a serving military officer of the army rank of Lieutenant Colonel, or navy or air force equivalent, or a senior officer from the Cadet College Service (promoted from the faculty members as per regulation). The vice principal is responsible for academic affairs.

A military officer of the rank of major is posted as the adjutant who is the principal's assistant and is responsible for administrative matters. Senior faculty members appointed as a House Master look after the administration of the Cadet Hostel/ Boarding House. All faculty members are attached to a Houses and are called House Tutors. The accounts officer looks after the matters relating to accounts and budget.

=== Cadet administration ===
To build leadership skills and maintain effective cadet administration a set of cadet leaders called Prefects are appointed from the cadets of the most senior class. The cadet administration works under the supervision of the college administration. The appointments are:

- College Prefect:CDT NUHA (847)
- House Prefects
- College Games Prefect
- College Cultural Prefect
- College Dining Hall Prefect
- Assistant House Prefects
- House Games Prefects
- House Cultural Prefects
- Junior Prefects (from class XI, to assist the Prefects named above)

== Infrastructure ==
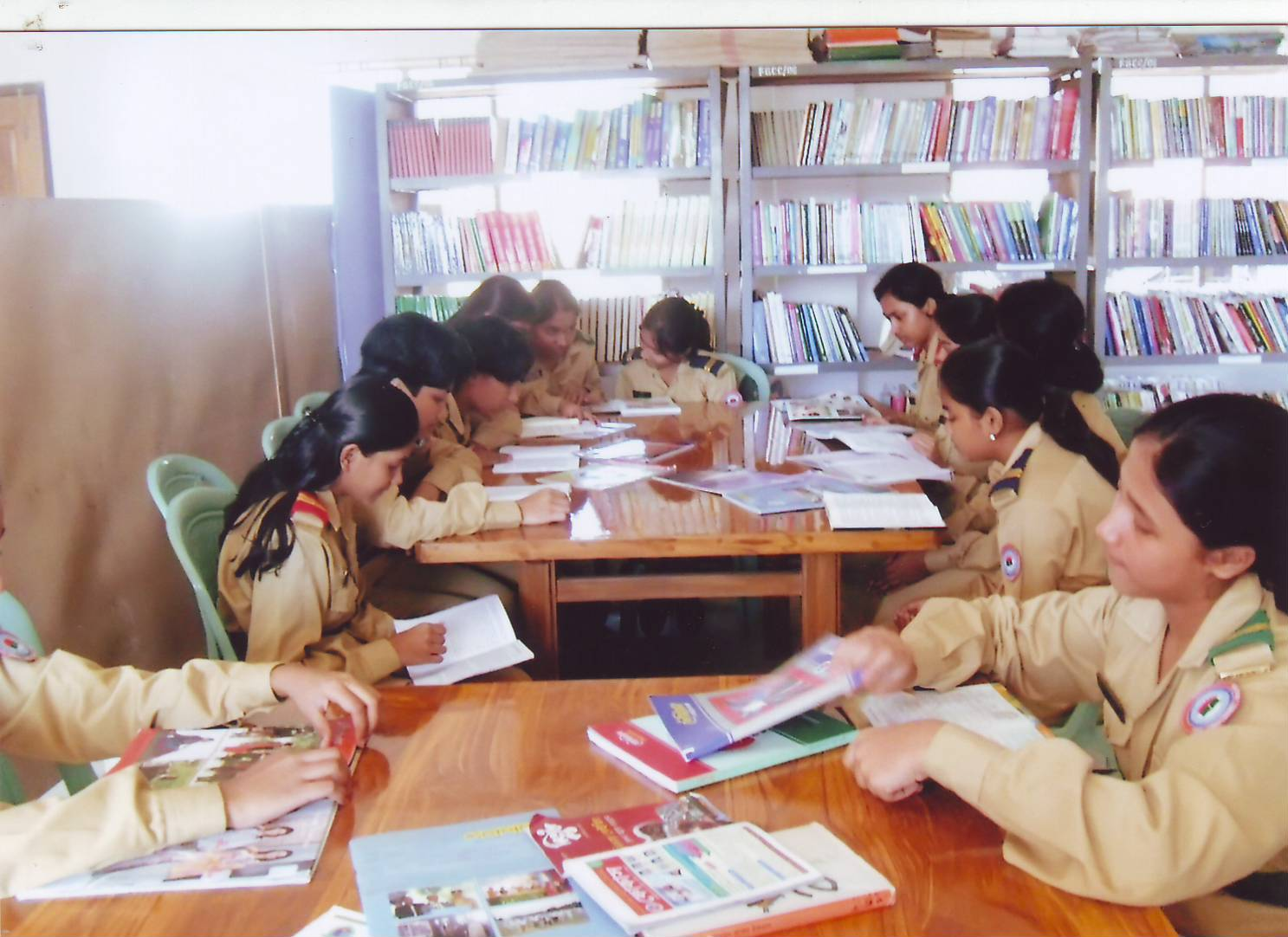
Cadets at College library

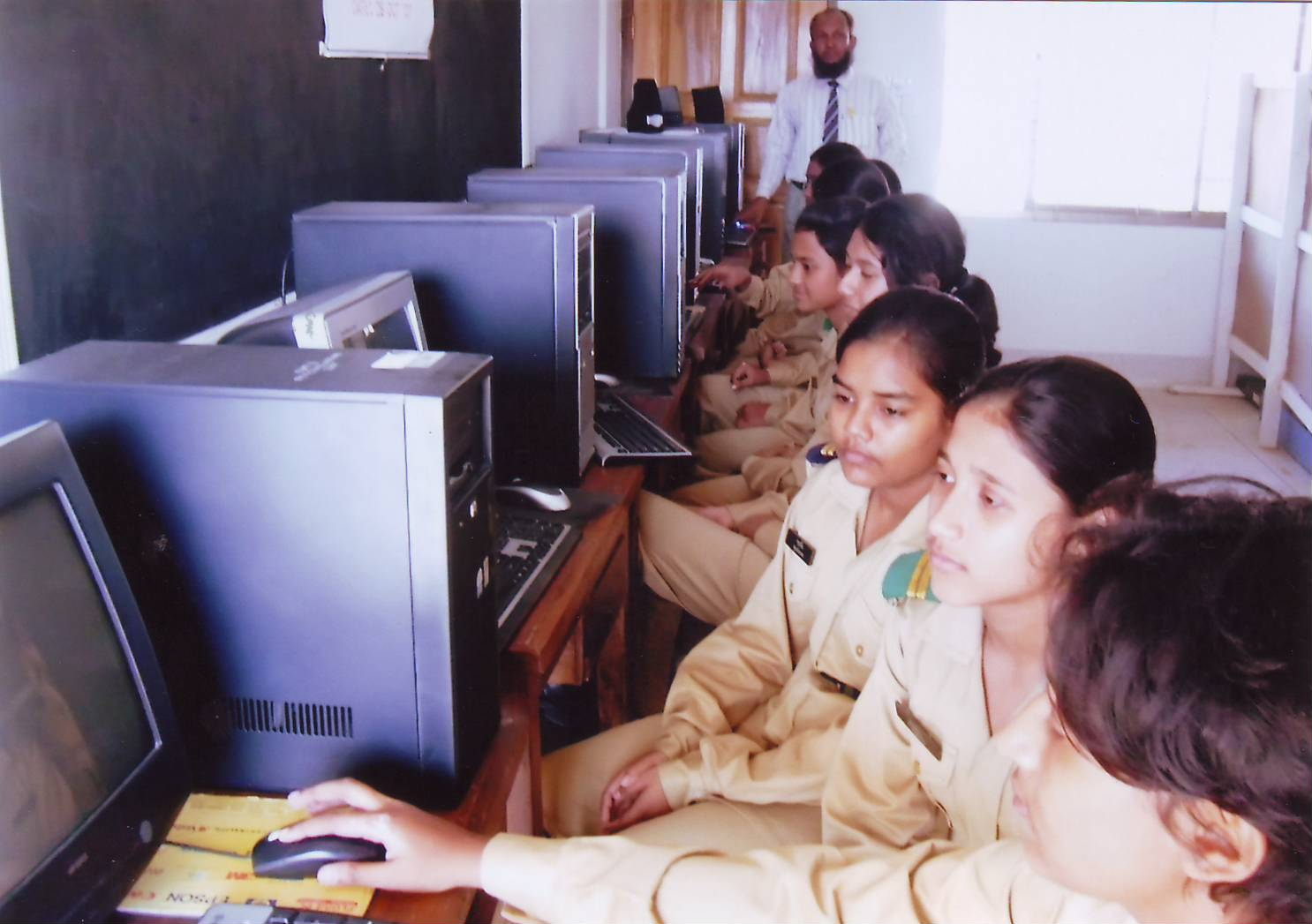
Cadets at computer lab

The college is spread over an area of approximately 49.5 acres (200,000 m^{2}). The buildings are

- Academic Block: (Jahangir Bhaban named after Bir Sreshtho Captain Mohiuddin Jahangir) is a modern three storey building which is the centre of teaching activity. The building houses the classrooms, art gallery, computer lab, science labs, language lab, archive, various academic departments, the Vice Principal's Office and the Staff Lounge (Lyceum).
- House: The three boarding houses (Khadiza, Ayesha and Fatema House) are large buildings, capable of accommodating 100 cadets in each. The housing complex is secured with a boundary wall and 24-hour guard.
- Cadet Mess: (Bir Sreshtho Matiur Dining Hall named after Bir Sreshtho Flight Lieutenant Matiur Rahman).
- Mosque
- Auditorium: (Mostofa Auditorium, named after Bir Srestho Sepoy Mostafa Kamal) has a modern stage and audio visual facilities. The two storied building can comfortably seat 650 persons.
- College Hospital: (Bir Sreshtha Nur Muhammad Hospital named after Bir Sreshtho Lance Naik Nur Mohammad Sheikh)
- College Library: (Bir Sreshtho Rouf Library named after Bir Sreshtho Lance Naik Munshi Abdur Rouf)
- Administrative Building: The central office building has two storeys. The Principal's Office, Adjutant's Office, Admin Office, Accounts Office and others are located here. The national and college flags fly in front of this building.
- Cadet Canteen: Cadets can purchase essential commodities and dry foods from the cadets' canteen. Cadets are issued monthly coupons as payment. Cadets are not permitted to carry cash.
- Sports fields, basketball courts, and a parade ground.
- Residential accommodation: The residential area is located on southern side of Feni-Chagolnaiya Road. The college provides accommodation to all employees. There is also a two-storey block to provide accommodation for unmarried male staff members.
- Generator Room and Electric Power Station
- Pump House
- Vehicle Shed
- Dhobi and Tailor Shop
- Dairy Farm
- General store and Ration Store

== Academic system ==
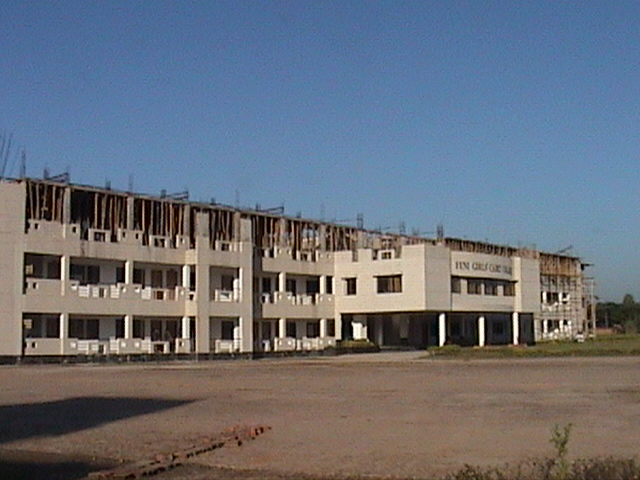
Academic Building

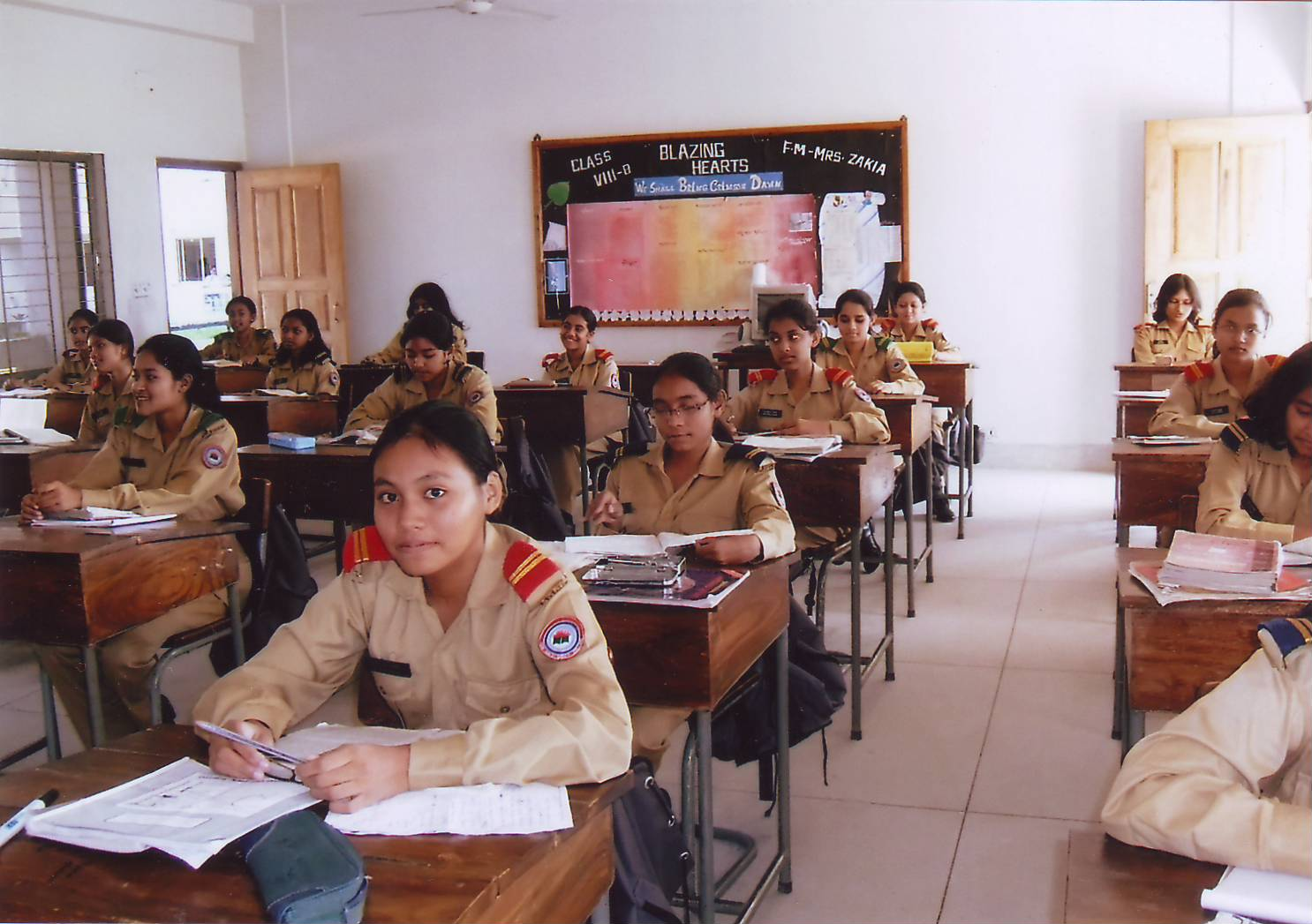
Cadets at class room

Cadets join in the seventh grade on a six-year course of study. The Higher Secondary Certificate (HSC) is leaving for matriculation examination and all pupils are working towards. Every intake consists of around 50 cadets divided into two groups (called forms) under the supervision of a Form Master. The Form Master is assisted by a Form Prefect selected from the cadets of that form.

The college holds regular internal examinations to assess progress and to prepare them for the Board Examinations.

The parents/guardians are regularly informed of their child's academic performance and attitude. Additional classes are arranged for struggling students. However, a student showing consistent poor performance will be withdrawn from the college.

The Secondary School Certificate (SSC) and the Higher Secondary Certificate (HSC) examinations are held under the control of the Secondary and Higher Secondary Education Board, Comilla. All the examination dates are published in the Academic Calendar at the beginning of the academic year. A calendar year is usually divided into three terms. The medium of instruction is English. Special emphasis is given in communicative English, religious studies, general knowledge and current affairs.

The first class of cadets presented for the SSC examinations in 2009 all achieved a GPA 5 (top grade) while 48/50 cadets achieved the designation Golden GPA (top grade with distinction).

== Faculty and staff ==
The vice principal is in charge of the academic section and the faculty. The faculty comprises two academic departments - science and humanities.

- Humanities: English, Bangla, Islamic Studies, Civics, Economics, Geography, History, Arts and Crafts, and Home Economics.
- Science: Mathematics, Physics, Chemistry, Biology, Statistics, and Computer Sciences.

In addition, the seniormost faculty member of each subject heads the department and supervises the curriculum of the respective subjects. Physical training, drill and musical band lessons are supervised by their respective instructors from the army (noncommissioned officers, usually corporal or sergeant).

== College events ==
Being a boarding school, the cadets live on campus. The college can accommodate 300 cadets in total.

The academic year of the college is marked by many different events and Inter-House Competitions. The events encourage confidence and sportsmanship among the cadets. All competitions—Academic, Co-Curricular and Extra-Curricular—award house points, which are counted towards that year's Championship Trophy, a coveted prize. The notable events of the college are:

=== College Stage Competition (CSC) ===
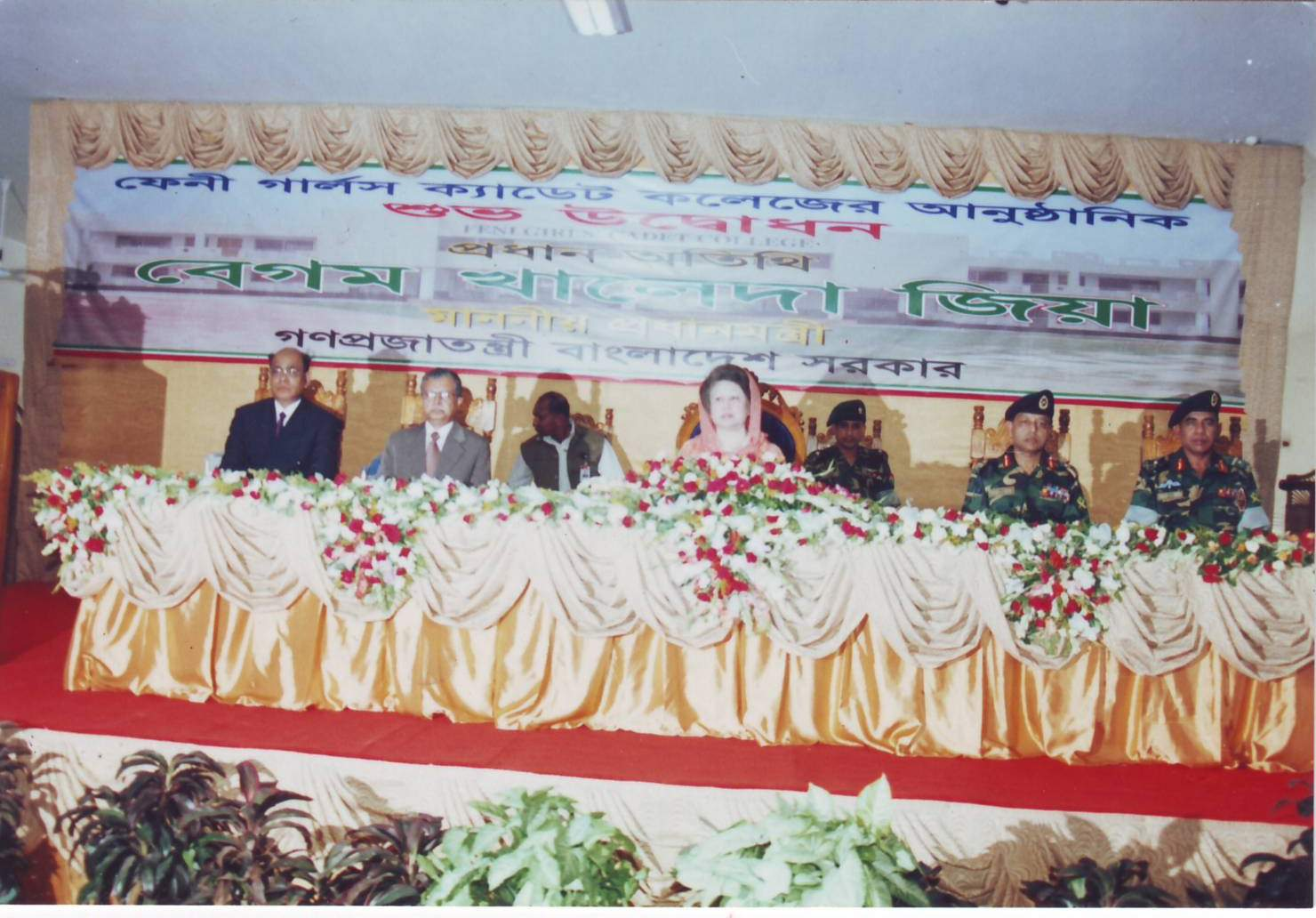
Inaugural Ceremony: From left Mr Faizul Hasan (Founder Principal), Mr Mahmud Hassan Monsur (Secretary MOD), Ex Prime Minister Begum Khaleda Zia, General Moeen U Ahmed(CAS), Major General Matiur Rahman(AG)

- Qirat Competition
- Extempore Speech Competition(Bengali and English)
- Story Telling Competition
- Debate (Bengali and English)
- Solo Acting Competition (Bengali and English)
- Parliamentary Debate (English)
- Music Competition
- Dance Competition
- Current Affairs Display Competition
- Recitation (Bangla and English)
- General Knowledge and Quiz Competition
- Spelling Competition (Bangla and English)
- Painting Competition

=== Hobbies clubs/societies ===
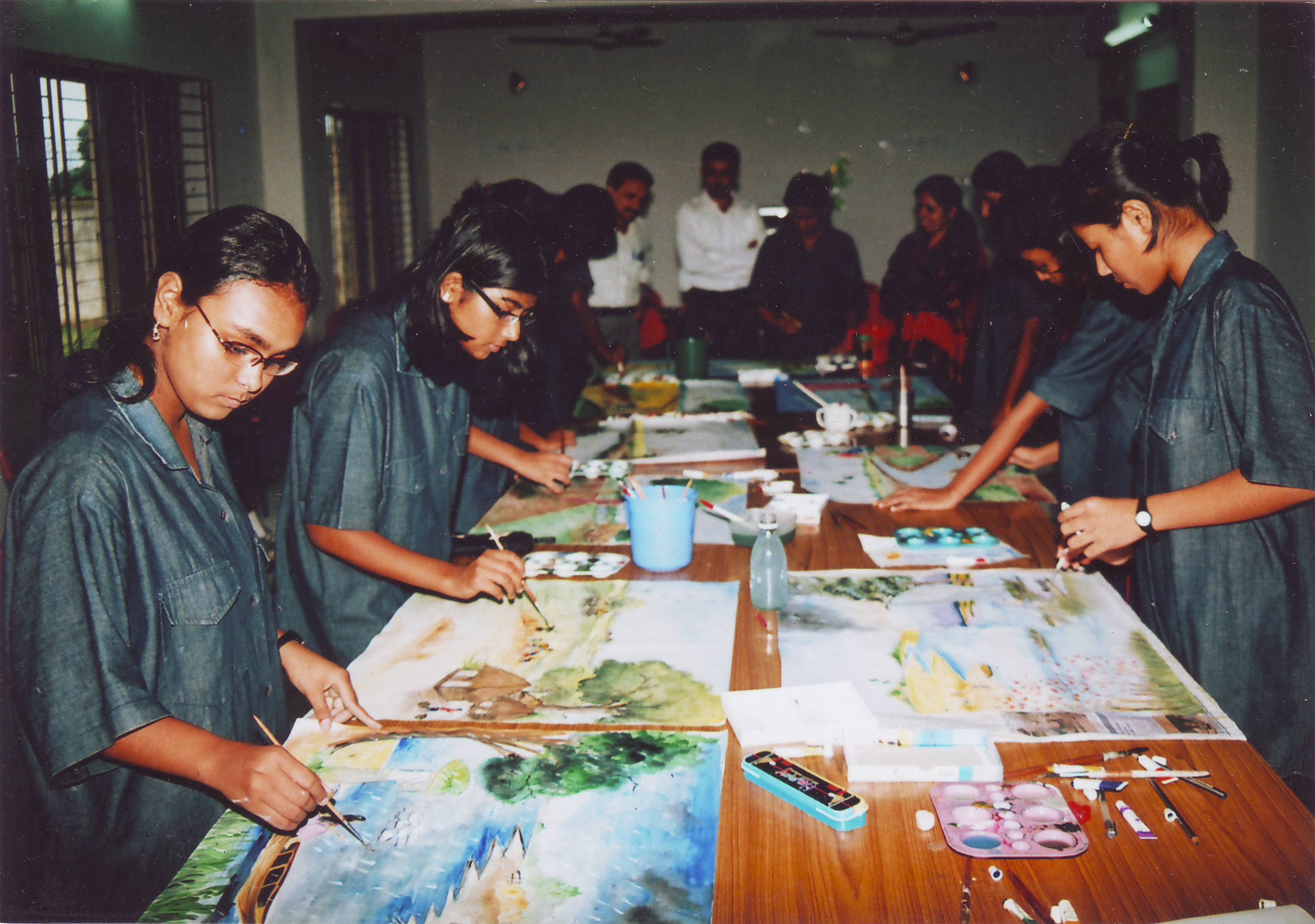
Arts and Crafts Club

- Quranic Society
- Physics Club
- Chemistry Club
- Biology Club
- Geography and Environment Club
- Arts and Crafts Club
- Current Affairs Club
- Bengali Literary and Cultural Society
- English Literary and Cultural Society
- Music and Dance Club
- First Aid Club
- Computer Club
- Sewing and Cooking Club
- Photography Club
- Hiking Club

=== Games and physical activities ===
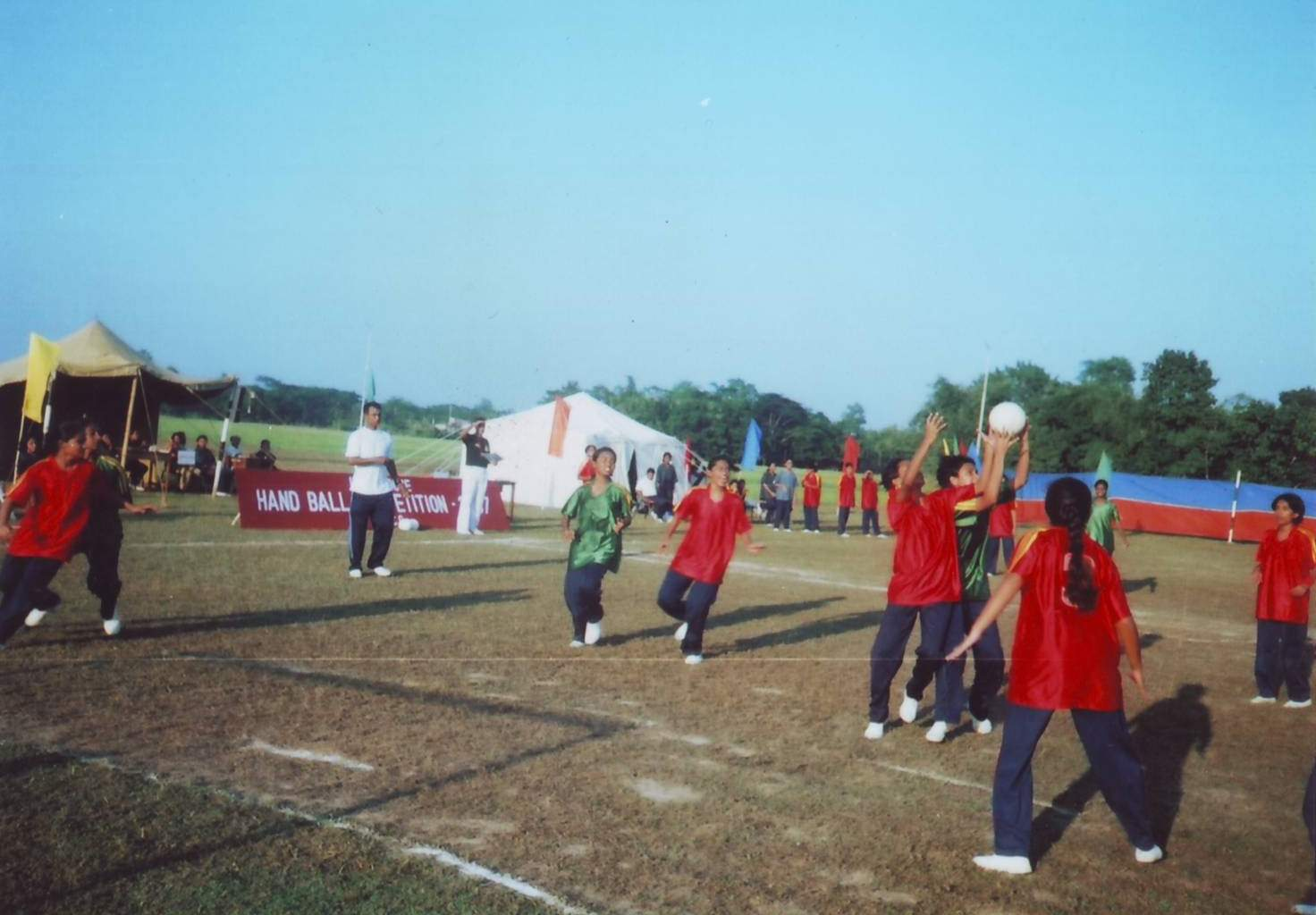
Cadets playing Handball

Every academic day (Saturday through Thursday) begins with either Physical Training or Drill (military parade) period of 30 mins. Cadets also take part in various games and sports in the afternoon (Saturday through Wednesday) for 50 mins. The college has facilities for handball, volleyball, badminton, cricket and athletics. Annual inter-house competitions are organised in following games and sports:

- Handball (senior and junior group)
- Badminton (senior and junior group)

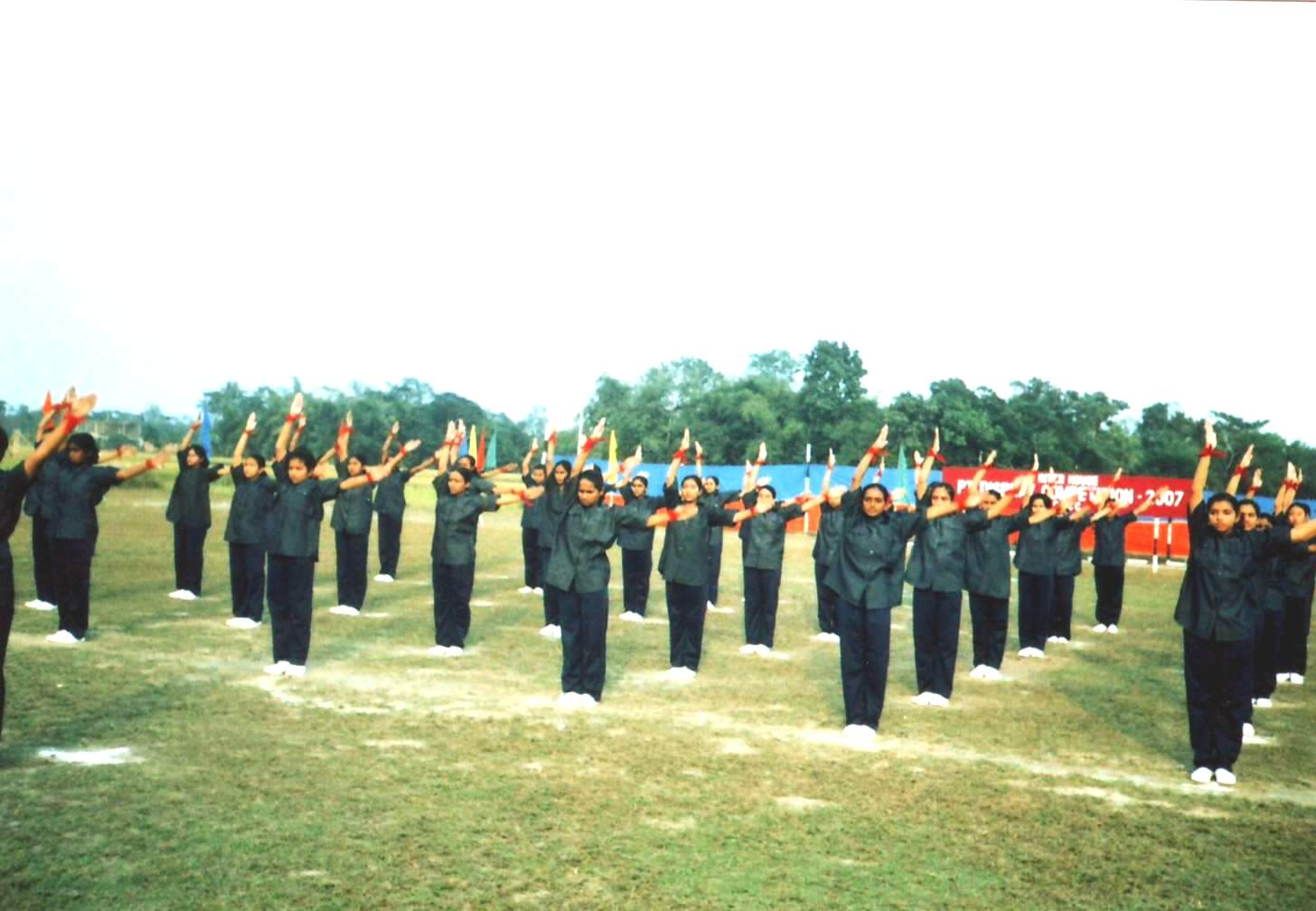
Inter House PT Display Competition

- Basket Ball (senior and junior group)
- Athletics (senior, intermediate and junior group)
- PT Display (combined)

The schedule of the competitions is circulated through the Calendar of Events at the beginning of the year. The Annual Athletic Competition is the final competition of the year and is held after the end of year examinations. It ends with a grand prize-giving ceremony to which the parents/guardians are invited.

=== Other competitions ===
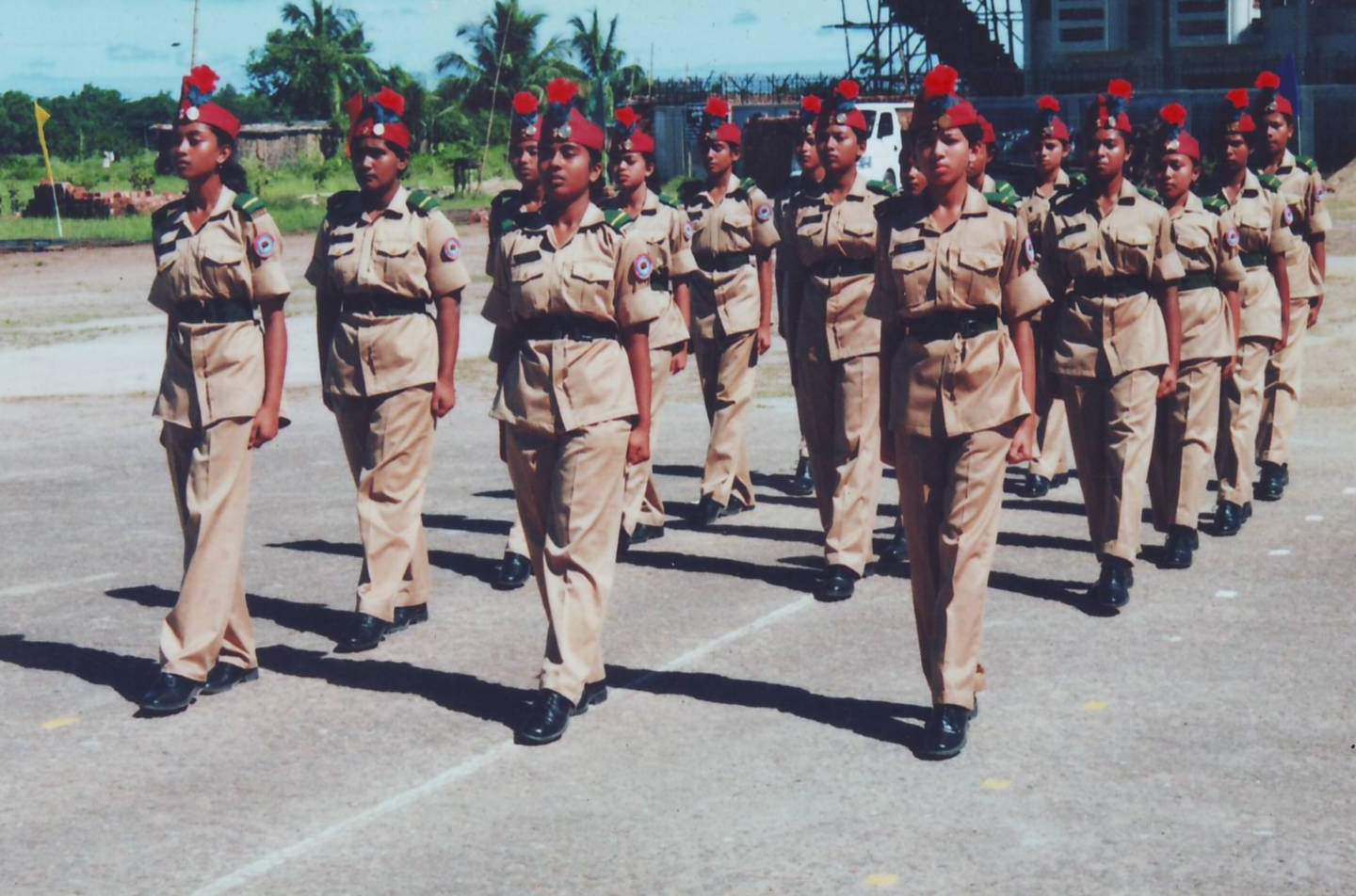
Novices' Drill Competition

- Inter-house Academic Competition (based on the academic performance of the cadets)
- Inter-house Novices' Drill Competition
- Principal's Inspection Parade
- Health and Hygiene Competition
- Principal's House Inspection
- Inter-house Drill Competition
- Inter-house Indoor Games Competition
- Discipline Competition

=== Educational visits, excursions and picnic ===
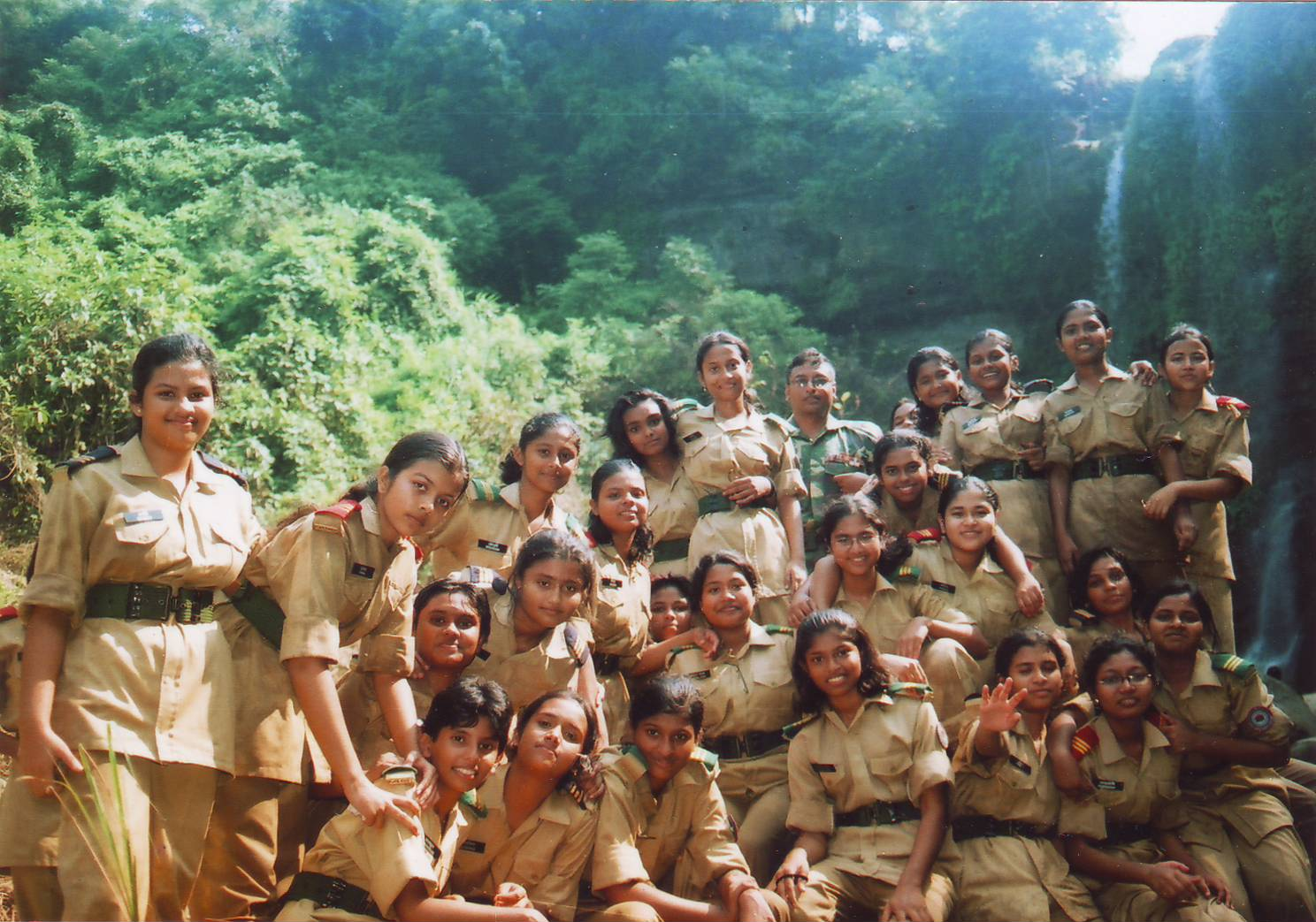
Cadets at Sitakundo Eco Park

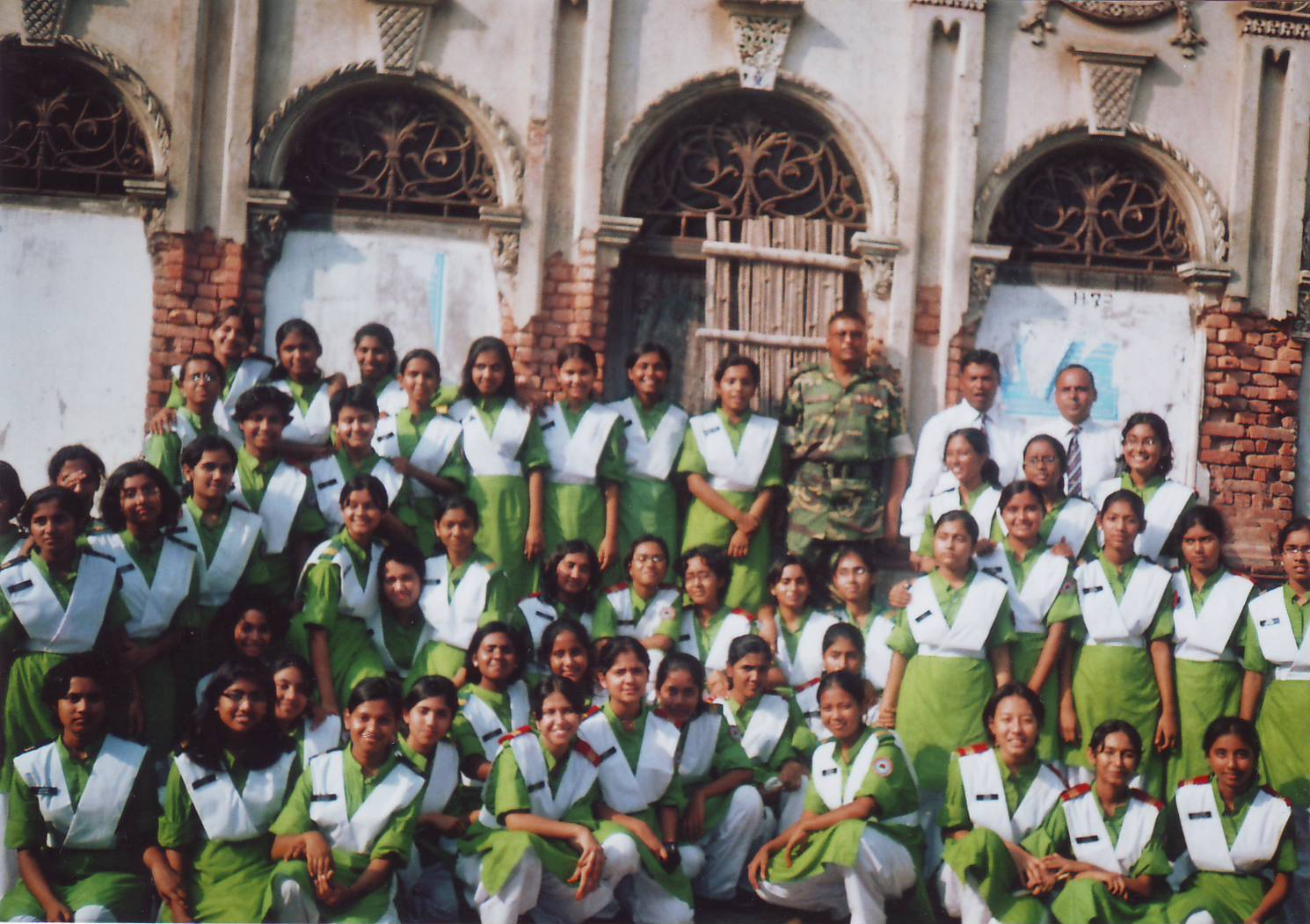
Outing at historical Panam City, Sonargaon

Educational visits and excursions are arranged regularly.

=== Cultural activities ===
Cadets are encouraged to participate in cultural activities.

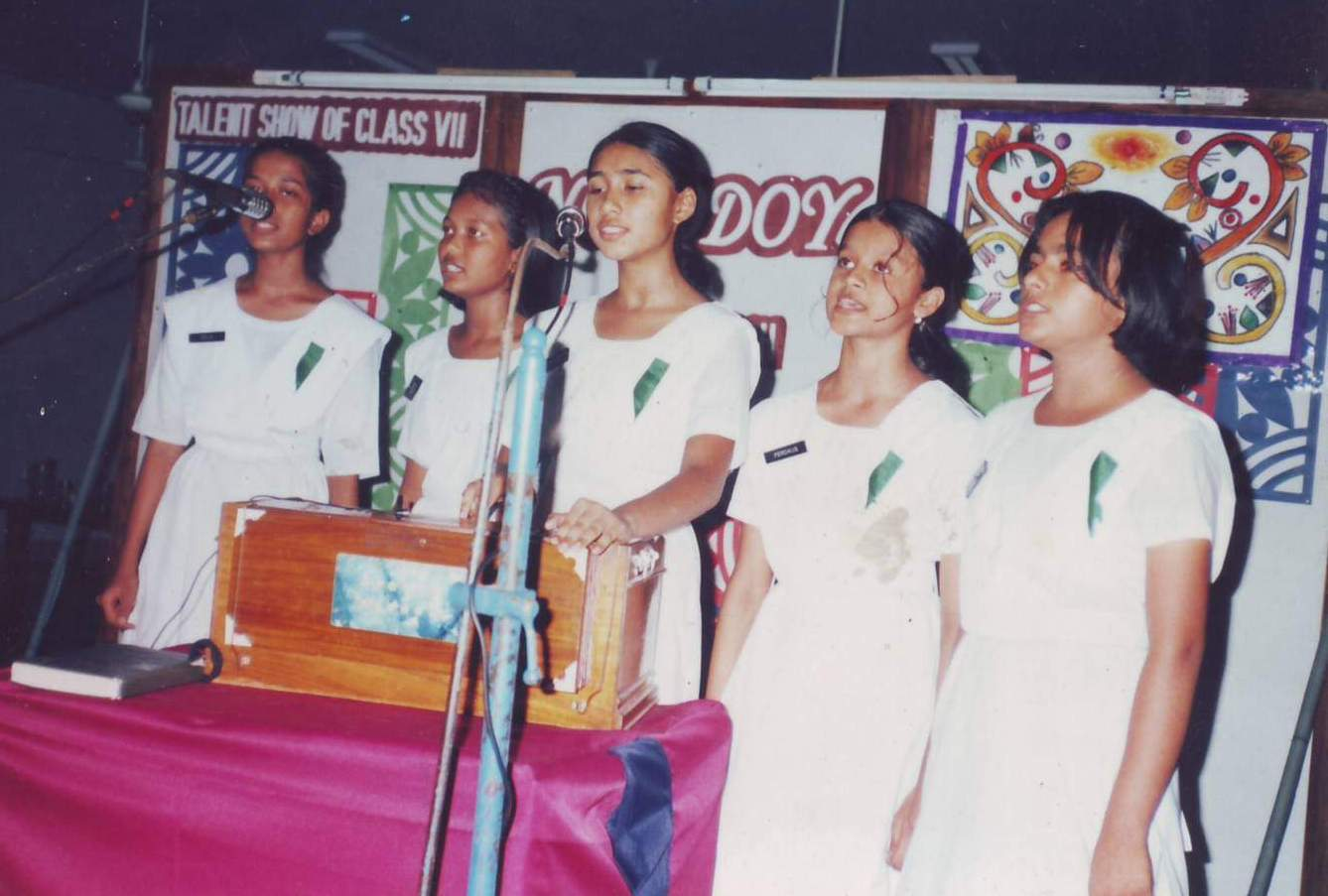
Talent Show

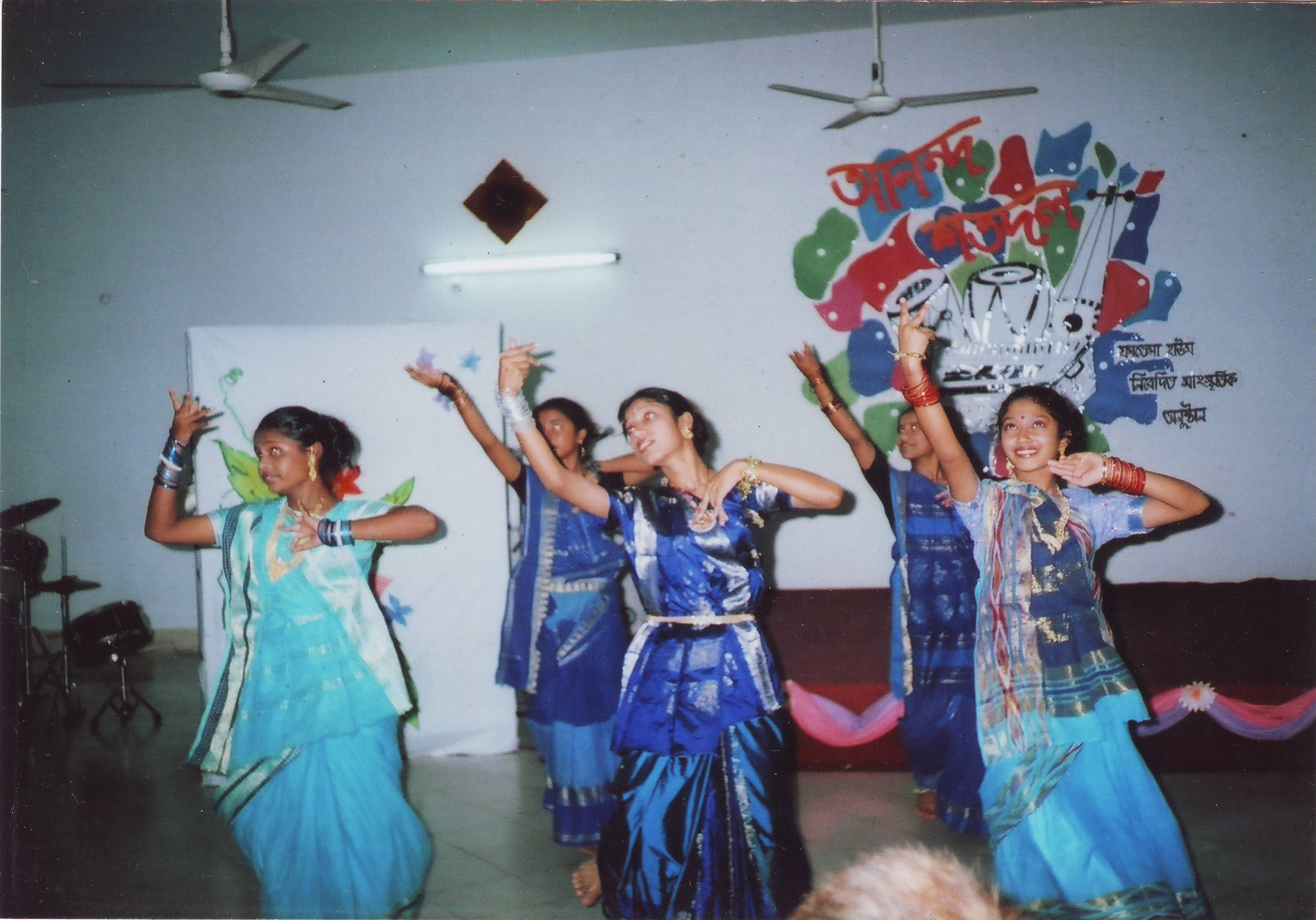
Cadets performing dance at a cultural show

Every class presents a cultural night where the officers and faculty members are invited along with family. Houses also present a cultural programme at the end of each term. Music and dance lessons are organised for interested cadets. The creative potential of a novice cadet is discovered through a Talent Show programme. Special occasions (Bengali New Year, Rabindra, Nazrul anniversary etc.) are celebrated through cultural shows and discussion.

=== Inter Cadet College and national competitions ===
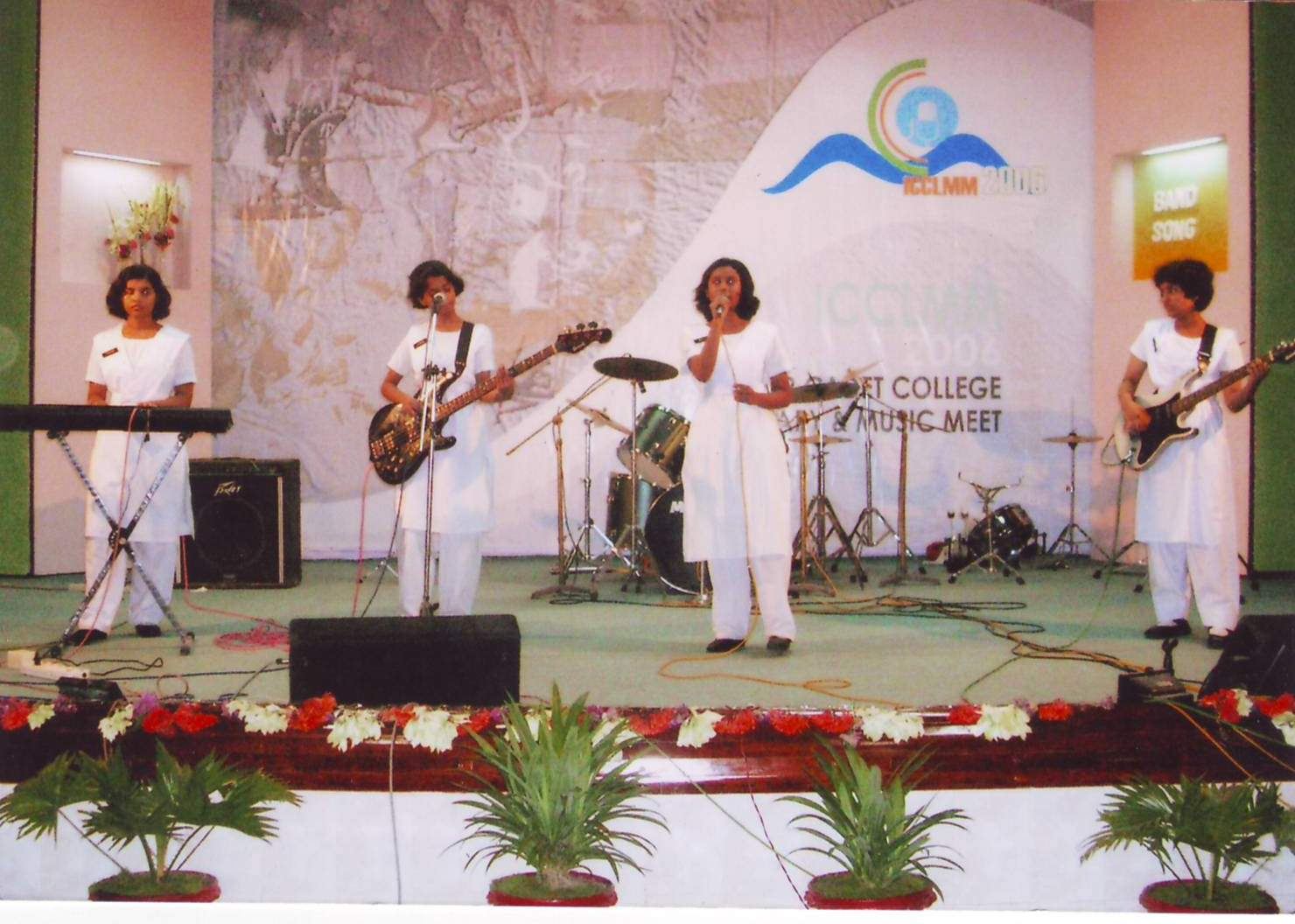
Band Show in Inter Cadet College Literary and Music Meet(ICCLMM):2006

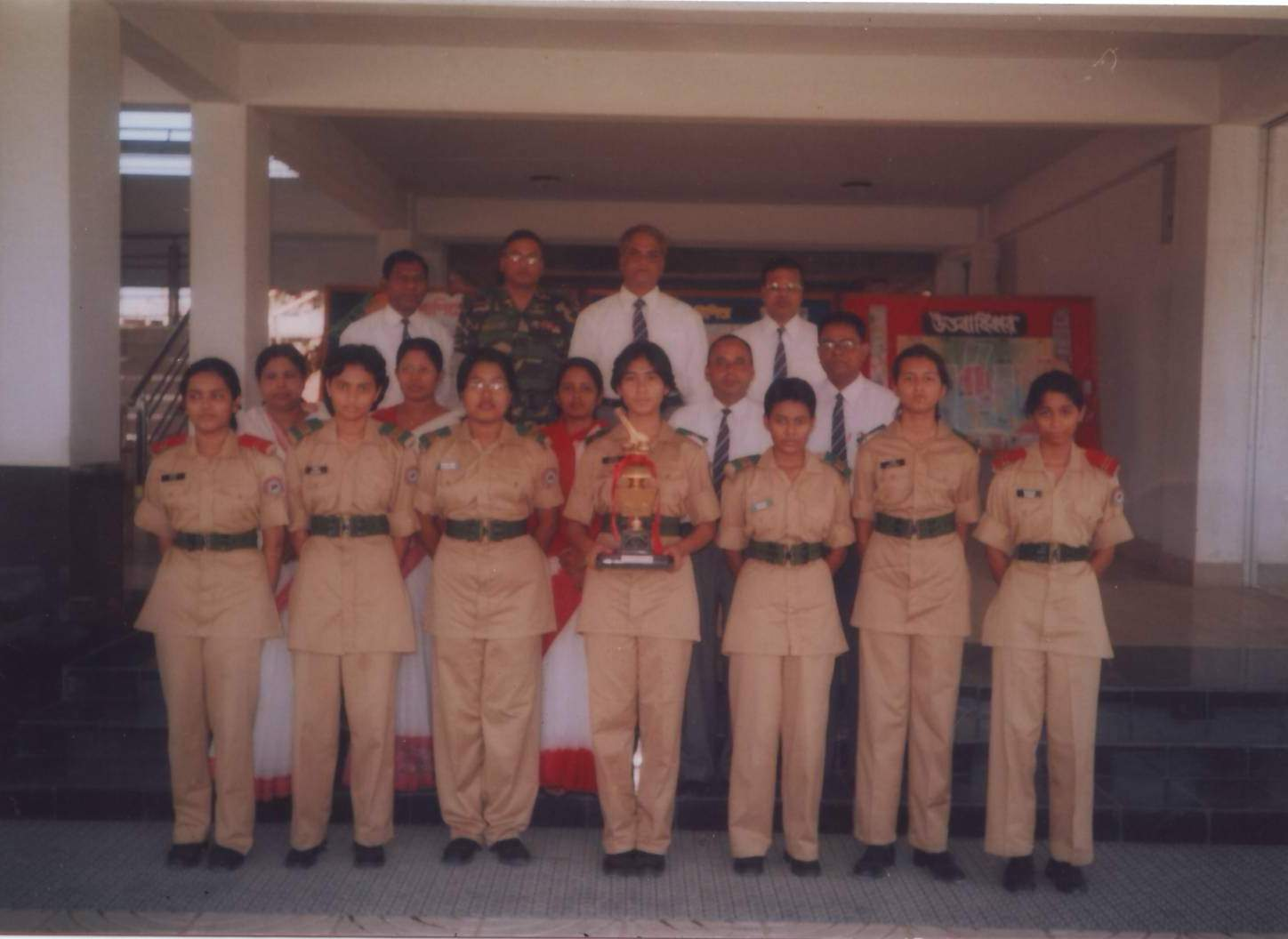
College Music Team(Runner Up in ICCLMM:2007) with Principal and Officers

FGCC participated in the Inter-Cadet College Literary and Music Meet (ICCLMM)- 2006 at Pabna Cadet College within a month of its opening and took part in all the events. Cadet Afsana and Cadet Muslima took second and third place in modern song and patriotic song respectively.

The college joined ICCLMM-2007 at Comilla Cadet College and displayed a performance in music events and a performance in literature. The college achieved the Runner-Up Trophy in Music, losing out to Mymensingh Girls' Cadet College by 0.5 point, and came in seventh overall. Cadet Muslima became champion in the Country song category and placed second in Nazrul Song. Cadet Shamima achieved second place in Tagore Song. Cadet Rahat Ara and Cadet Nasiba came in third in the Extempore Speech Competition in Bengali and English, respectively.

At ICCLMM-2008 held at Sylhet Cadet College the college band was 2nd. Cadet Muslima achieved 3rd in Folk Song while Cadet Rahat Ara became 2nd in Classical Song.

The college became Runner Up in first-ever Inter-Girls' Cadet College Sports Meet (IGCCSM) held in 2009 at Joypurhat Girls' Cadet College (JGCC).

Cadet Colleges have a prestigious history in national competitions such as theNational TV Debate Competition (in Bengali), the newly introduced National Parliamentary Debate(in English) on Bangladesh Television and other quiz competitions at national level. Fenians are also working hard and preparing to match the pedigree of their sister cadet colleges

== Mess ==
The College Mess is a large spacious dining hall, which can accommodate 300 cadets at a time and has sufficient facilities required for cooking and service of food, stocking of dry and fresh provisions. The mess functions under the supervision of a member of the teaching staff (faculty member). Cadets are also involved in the management of the mess. A committee is presided over by the Vice Principal and includes both the Officer-In-Charge Cadet Mess and cadet representatives. They make every effort to provide a balanced diet with extra food if required in special cases. All incoming food supplies are checked and certified by the Medical Officer before being received. The cadets eat five meals a day in the Mess.

Cadets are not allowed to eat using their hand. The use of forks and spoons is mandatory. On occasion, a formal dinner is arranged (e.g. farewell of an officer or faculty member, end of term dinner or in honour of a special guest visiting the college) where the officers and faculty members are invited to along with their spouses.

The routine meals of the cadets are:

- Breakfast with tea( after morning Physical Training or Parade, at around 7 am)
- Snacks and Milk (at around 10 am, after 4th period)
- Lunch ( after morning lessons, at around 1.15 pm)
- Afternoon tea with snacks (before or after the Magrib prayers depending on the season)
- Dinner (at around 8 pm, between evening and night preparation classes)

== Medical facilities ==
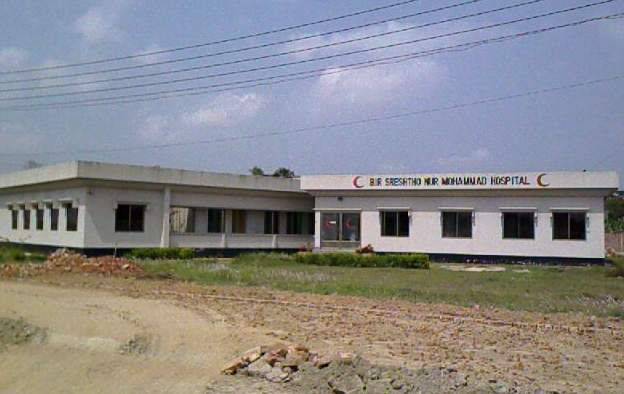
College Hospital (Bir Sreshtho Nur Muhammad Hospital)

An 18-bed hospital functions on campus. It is looked after by the College Medical Officer, a serving Major/Captain from Army Medical Corps assisted by other medical staff. Minor ailments are treated here but for specialized or serious injury or illness the patients are referred to Feni Sadar Hospital/CMH Comilla. To guard against epidemics, vaccinations and inoculations are carried out as and when required. The cadets are weighed, measured and medically checked up and a proper health record is maintained of all cadets.

The hospital also has an isolation ward for the segregation of patients with infectious diseases.

In case a cadet needs an operation, all out efforts are made to inform the parents or guardians. However, if there is no time to inform them, such students are operated upon without any delay. The parents/guardians of cadets are required to submit a written permission for emergency, lifesaving surgery. In case of an emergency the authority rests with the principal.
