= Cadet College Razmak =

Coordinates: 32.68271°N 69.83372°E

Cadet College Razmak (CCR)
- Razmak, North Waziristan District, Pakistan; North West Frontier Province

Information
- Type: Military High School
- Motto: Unity, Faith, Discipline
- Established: 1978
- Area: 154 acres (0.62 km^{2})
- Colour: Blue
- Demonym: Razmians
- Houses: 6

Cadet College Razmak is a military high school, located in the valley of Razmak, in North Waziristan District of Khyber Pakhtunkhwa province in Pakistan. It was previously part of Pakistan's Federally Administered Tribal Areas (FATA).

== History ==
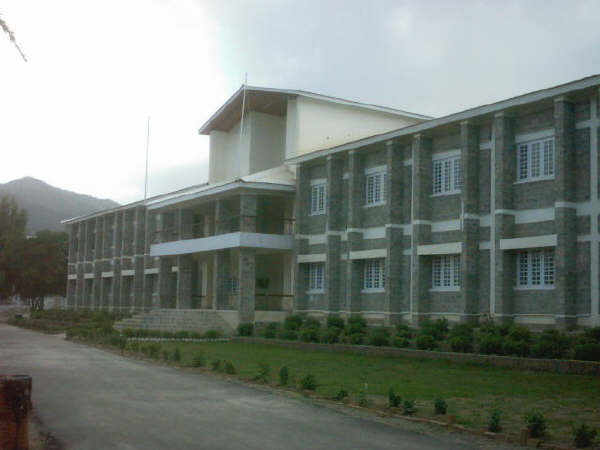
Academic block of the college

The college was founded by the late prime minister of Pakistan, Zulfikar Ali Bhutto, in the late 1970s during his visit to Miranshah, North Waziristan agency. Initially it was set in Razmak lower camp. The institution feeds the Pakistan Military Academy at Kakul.

The college became operational in 1978 on the land of Nawab Gulmaizar Khan, with a single boarding hostel, Ghazali House. Asghar Ali Choudhry was appointed its first principal. Later that year, another boarding hostel, Bilal House, was established.

In 1979, owing to the increasing number of cadets, a third boarding hostel, Jinnah House, was established. Former Major Geoffrey Langlands, an Aitchison College teacher, was appointed the principal.

The fourth boarding hostel, Babar House, was established in 1980. The fifth boarding hostel, Abdali house, was established in 1981 and another, Khushal house, in 1982. In 1997, due to increasing number of students, the 7th hostel, Iqbal House, was established. However, it was later dispensed with.

In 1988, Jan Gul Khattak was appointed as a principal.

In 1991, Michael C. Cawthrone took charge as principal.

1997 marked a turn-around for Cadet College Razmak. Brig (R) Bashir Hussain Khattak took over as the principal and revolutionized the college. During his tenure, the college saw major infrastructure changes.

In 2003, Mr. Khan Muhammad Khalil was appointed principal. In 2008, Prof. Quresh Khan was selected as an acting principal, and then Mr. Javed Iqbal Paracha became principal.

In June 2009, hundreds of students and some teachers of the college were kidnapped by Taliban militants on their way to Bannu from Razmak. All were released within three days, however due to the uncertain situation the college's academic setup was shifted to Islamia College Peshawar.

In May 2011, Roughly two years after being displaced from their home campus, the Razmians shifted back to Razmak.

In April 2012, The College was again shifted to Aman Ghar due to prevailing law & order situation in North Waziristan.

In December 2012, Army posted a serving Colonel (Razmian) as Principal with a mission to recreate the college. Commander 11 Corps Peshawar got new accommodation at Nowshera cantt for the College. The new accommodation fulfilled all the requirements of the college. The new accommodation was of 19 and 20th century built and identical to Razmak in outlook. The complete college was shifted by 6 March 2013. Cadet College was moved back to Razmak in September 2015 to its original location.

== Academics ==
The students are prepared for the Secondary School Certificate and Intermediate Examination conducted by the Federal Board of Intermediate and Secondary Education, Islamabad. The following subjects are taught:

- Secondary School Certificate Examination: English, Urdu, Islamiat, Pakistan studies, mathematics, physics, chemistry and computer science.
- Intermediate Examination (Pre-Engineering Group): English, Urdu, Islamic Studies, Pakistan studies, mathematics, physics and chemistry.
- Intermediate Examination (Pre-Medical Group): English, Urdu, Islamic Studies, Pakistan studies, biology, physics and chemistry.
- Intermediate Examination (Computer Science): English, Urdu, Islamic Studies, Pakistan studies, mathematics, physics and computer science.

== Student life ==
Cadets take part in sports such as field hockey, football, Cricket, basketball, swimming, volleyball, squash and tennis. Fitness activities include judo, karate, gymnastics, jogging and running. Physical training is conducted in the morning and sports in the evening. Students are taught drill.

=== Religious education ===
Islamiat is a compulsory subject. Motivational talks and prayers in the college mosque supplement religious education in the classrooms.

=== Examinations ===
The college holds internal examinations to assess the ability of the students and prepare them for the Board Examinations. Progress tests, Send Ups and Pre-Board Examinations are a feature of the college schedule.

The parents and guardians are kept informed of their son's or ward's overall performance and attitude. Students showing consistently poor performance are withdrawn from the college.

== Infrastructure ==
The college covers an area of about 154 acres (0.62 km^{2}).

The buildings comprise a mosque, a double-stored academic block, auditorium, eight hostels called "houses", one combined cadets' mess, an administration block, and a science block. Sports facilities includes four squash courts and football, hockey, cricket, basketball, volleyball grounds and six tennis courts. The college has residential accommodation for the teaching and administrative staff.

== Principals ==
- Choudhry Asghar Ali
- Major G. D. Langland
- Sq. Ldr. Agha Khalil Ahmed
- Colonel Jan Gul Khattak
- Michal C. Cawthorne
- Brigadier Bashir Hussain (Retired)
- Prof. Khan Muhammad Khalil
- Prof. Quresh Khan
- Prof.Javed Iqbal Paracha
- Maj (R) Manzoor Hussain Qureshi
- Prof. Abdus Salam
- Colonel Tahir Qayyum (Deputed)
- Prof. Gul Zamin
- Prof. Fazli Mabood
- Brigadier Shafqat Abbas (Deputed)
- Colonel Taimur Hamid (Deputed)
- Brigadier Mirza Faisal Saleem Baig (Deputed)
- Brigadier Noman Arif (Deputed)

== Selection/induction of cadets ==
Thousands of aspiring students apply for admission to Cadet College Razmak each year. A selection procedure is adopted for enrolling a batch of 140 students or cadets in Class 8th.

== Eligibility criteria ==
- Gender – male
- Religion – any
- Education – the candidate should be studying in Class 7th in a registered school. Candidates who have just passed Class 7th and are studying in Class 8th are also eligible.
- Age – 12 to 14 years

== Admission tests ==
- Written tests are conducted simultaneously at centers in Peshawar, Bannu, Kohat, Dera Ismail Khan, Mardan, Quetta, Sakkar and Rawalpindi. The tests consist of questions in the subjects of English, mathematics and Islamiat/Urdu. The results of the written tests are advertised in newspapers (especially the Daily Mashriq, Peshawar) and the successful candidates are notified by post.
- Interviews – Candidates short-listed on the basis of written tests are interviewed by boards consisting of the college's teachers at centers in Peshawar and other cities. During the interview, the candidates also take IQ and psychological tests.
- Medical fitness tests – Side by side with the interview, the short-listed candidates are also checked by a medical doctor for medical and physical fitness. A candidate failing in the medical fitness test, although otherwise cleared by the interview board, is rejected.

== See also ==
- Cadet College Swat
- Cadet College Hasan Abdal
- Cadet College Kohat
- Cadet College Mastung
- Cadet College Skardu
