= Cadet College Fateh Jang =

- کیڈٹ کالج فتح جنگ
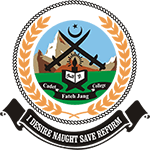

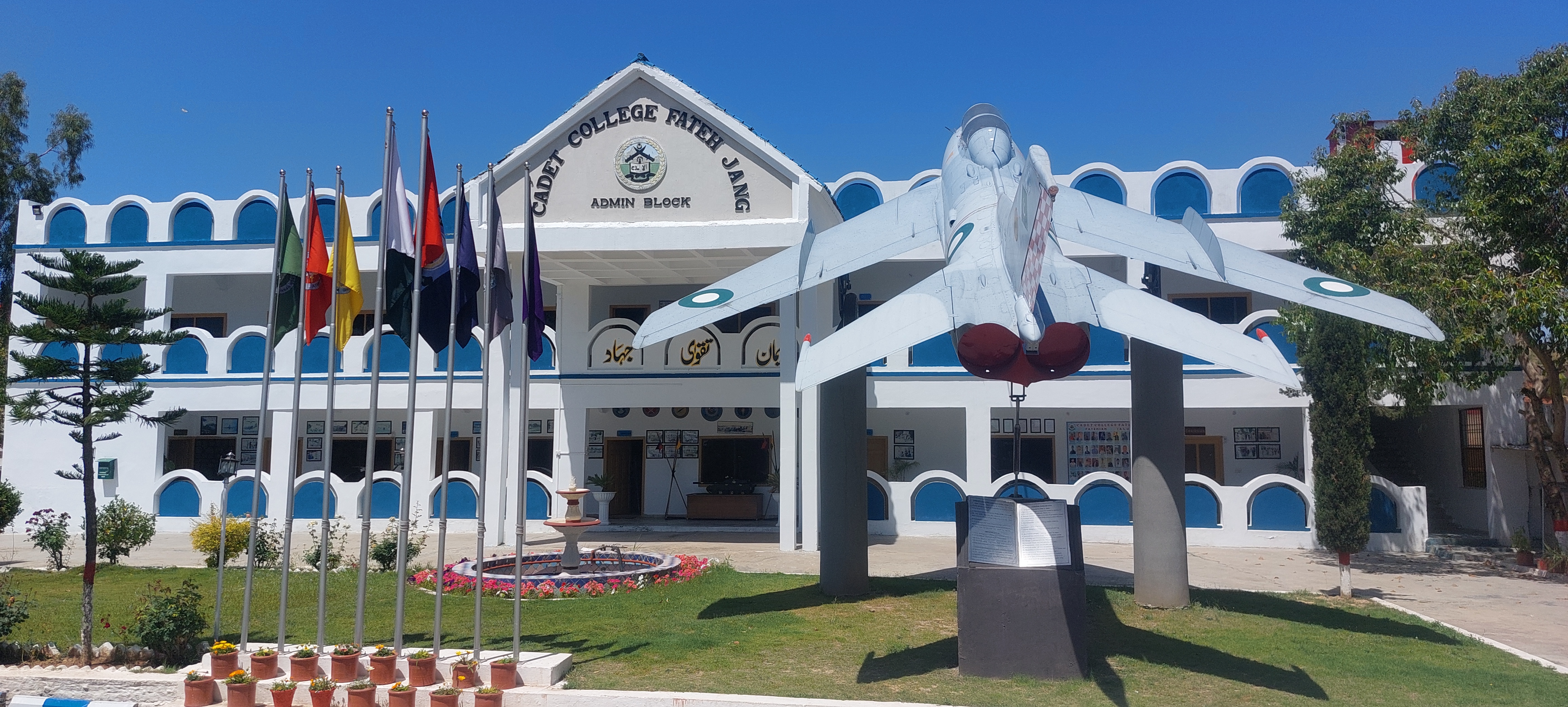
- Main Building of the Cadet College Fateh Jang

Location
- Civil Hospital Road; Fateh Jang, Punjab; Pakistan; 33.5621°N 72.5807°E

Information
- Type: Cadet college
- Motto: (Arabic: إِنْ أُرِيدُ إِلَّا الْإِصْلَاحَ مَا اسْتَطَعْتُ) (I Desire Naught Save Reform [Hud – 11:88 (Sura : 11, Verse 88) Al-Quran])
- Established: 2001
- Founder: Mushtaq Ahmed Sipra
- Principal: Engr. Hasnat Ahmed (Retired Sr. Engr, PAEC), ELC (Ireland)
- Staff: 55
- Grades: 6 to 12
- Gender: Boys
- Age: 12 to 18
- Enrollment: 300 Cadets
- Language: English
- Campus size: 27.5 acres (11.1 ha)
- Houses: 6
- Color: Blue
- Yearbook: Dastak
- Affiliation: Rawalpindi Board
- Alumni: CCFJ Alumni
- Demonym: Fatehian
- Website: www.ccf.edu.pk

Cadet College Fateh Jang (Urdu: کیڈٹ کالج فتح جنگ) is a boys cadet college in Fateh Jang, Punjab, near Islamabad, Pakistan. It was established in 2001.

The cadet college provides students with multiple academic pathways, including Pakistani higher education, GCE O level and A level qualifications, and ISSB training for entry into the armed forces of Pakistan. Situated on over 220 kanals, the college comprises six houses and has facilities such as a mess hall, auditorium, three hostel blocks, two academic blocks, a mosque, swimming pool, sports amenities, cafeteria, and medical unit. It has the capacity to accommodate 350 cadets.

== History ==
Cadet College Fateh Jang was founded by Mushtaq Ahmed Sipra, an educationist who also established Bahria Foundation Schools as the founding manager. The college was conceived in 2000 and began its operations in 2001.

Over the years, many notable personalities have attended the college ceremonies, including Air Chief Marshal Sohail Aman NI(M), Governor Punjab Sardar Saleem Haider Khan, Abdul Qayyum, Muhammad Shawez Khan, Mr. Sher Ali Khan, and Samar Mubarakmand.

== Campus ==
The campus has a two-story administrative block, an academic block, six boarding wings (Ayubi House, Ghazali House, Roomi House, Jinnah House, Sir Syed House, and Nishter House), an auditorium, a cadet mess, and an indoor sports complex. The academic block is equipped with whiteboards, projectors, and other audiovisual aids to facilitate learning. Additional facilities include a computer lab, library, science laboratories, and a mosque. The campus also has numerous playgrounds, a stadium with a 2000-person capacity, and a swimming pool for recreational activities.

=== Auditorium ===
The auditorium, with a capacity for approximately 1,000 attendees, serves as a multi-purpose venue for college students. Featuring a large stage, it hosts stage dramas, social events, talent showcases, co-curricular activities, and competitions. Additionally, the auditorium provides a platform for speeches by guests and commemorates significant ceremonial, national, and religious occasions.

The college is also recognized for its role in hosting the All Pakistan Debate Competition, held at its auditorium.

=== Hostels ===
The college initially housed 40-50 cadets across two hostels, known as Ayubi and Romi houses. These hostels, referred to as houses, symbolically represented cadets through distinct colors. Subsequently, Ghazali, Jinnah, Nishtar, and Sir Syed houses were established in 2003, 2008, 2010, and 2014, respectively. Each room in these hostels accommodates eight cadets.

=== Sports complex ===
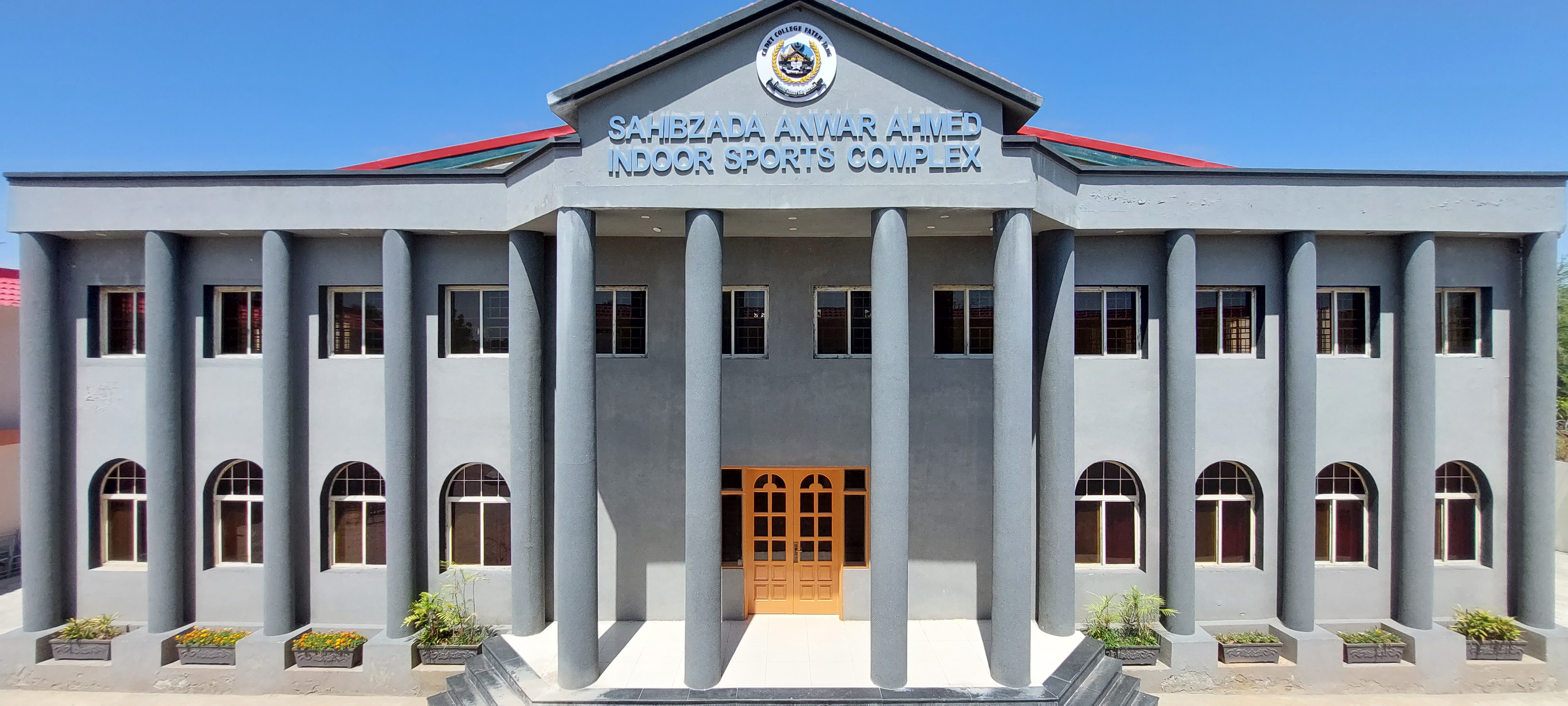
A front view of the sports complex of the college

The Sahibzada Anwar Ahmed Sports Complex is a multifunctional sports facility which is named after Sahibzada Anwar Ahmed, a member of the college Board of Governors. The rectangular complex measures 25 feet in height, 84 feet in width, and 90 feet in length. It houses an array of indoor sports facilities, including a volleyball court, badminton courts, table tennis areas, and spaces for playing carrom board, chess, and ludo, as well as a basketball court. Additionally, an adjoining hall has an exercise equipment for physical fitness and bodybuilding.

== Governance and organisation ==
The governing body of the college consists of military officers, educationists, and former civil servants.

=== Houses ===
The cadet college is divided into six administrative houses to provide independent hostels and playground facilities to the cadets.

Colours	House	Named after
Red	Ayubi	Saladin
Navy Blue	Roomi	Jalāl ad-Dīn Muhammad Rūmī
Dark Green	Jinnah	Muhammad Ali Jinnah
Yellow	Ghazali	Al-Ghazali
Purple	Nishtar	Sardar Abdur Rab Nishtar
Grey	Sir Syed	Syed Ahmad Khan

=== Admission, fees, and financial aid ===
Students in grades 6 through 9 undergo a multi-stage admission process, beginning with subject-specific entry tests based on their respective curricula and general knowledge. Applicants scoring above 65 percent advance to a physical fitness assessment, which evaluates vision, weight, height, chest and waist measurements, knee stability, and running endurance. Subsequently, qualifying candidates go through a general interview.

Upon admission, cadets, based on academic performance, can become eligible for various financial awards. Full tuition fee concessions are granted to students who achieve the top three positions in board examinations. Additional scholarships include the Class Distinction Scholarship and the Late Mushtaq Ahmed Sipra Memorial Merit. The Chairman Discretionary Fund provides scholarships for those scoring over 90 percent in board examinations, and additional concessions are extended to children of Pakistan Air Force personnel.

Students at the Cadet College Fateh Jang have consistently excelled, achieving high marks in the annual Board of Intermediate and Secondary Education, Rawalpindi examinations.

The college has close ties to the Pakistan military services, where it provides special discounts for the children of serving PAF and Armed Forces members.
