= Cadet College Skardu =

Military high school in Gilgit-Baltistan, Pakistan

Location
- Skardu, Gilgit-Baltistan, Pakistan
- Coordinates: 35.3497°N 75.5111°E

Information
- Motto: We Beat The Best
- Opened: 2001
- Area: 997 kanals
- Colour: Blue
- Demonym: Skardovians
- Houses: 6
- Website: ccs.edu.pk

Cadet College Skardu is a military high school located at Skardu, Gilgit-Baltistan, Pakistan. It is being administered by the Ministry of Kashmir and Gilgit-Baltistan Affairs.

== History ==
Cadet College Skardu was established in 2001 and was funded by the Government of Pakistan.

In September 2005, the second principal, Col. Khalid Sharif, was removed from his post after students staged protests against his conduct. A Board of Governors meeting, chaired by the Chief Secretary of the Northern Areas, found Sharif guilty of instigating religious disharmony and mistreating students and staff. Students had accused him of abusive behavior and providing substandard food; during the unrest they even held the commandant hostage and locked the college gates until authorities intervened. Sharif was dismissed and replaced by Lt. Col. Safdar Ali Kazmi as acting commandant in 2005. Another crisis emerged in 2010 when mismanagement led to a staff strike: the then principal, Col. Azhar Hussain, resigned amid protests by faculty and cadets.

In 2021, the Pakistan Army funded and built a modern squash court complex. It was inaugurated by former world champion Jansher Khan in July 2021. Later, the Gilgit-Baltistan Annual Development Programme for 2021–22 included an allocation of PKR 20 million for "provision of missing facilities" at Cadet College Skardu.

== Location ==
The campus of Cadet College Skardu is located in the center of Skardu valley next to the Skardu airport in Hotto town. Skardu is linked to Islamabad International Airport by a daily flight. It takes about forty five to sixty minutes to fly from Islamabad to Skardu. The college is approximately 7,000 feet (2,100 m) above sea level.

== Building ==
The foundation stone of the college was laid in 1994. Phase-I of the College has been completed at a cost of Rs.150 million. The College Campus, which includes three hostels, accommodations for staff, academic block and planned civic facilities is spread over an area exceeding 1000 kanals (125 acres).

== Principals ==
- Brig Taj Iqbal (2001-2003)
- Col Khalid Sharif (2003-2005)
- Col Safdar Abbas Kazmi (2005-2006)
- Brig Ejaz Ahmed Najaf (2006-2008)
- Brig Nasser Khan Jadoon (2008-?)

Brig Fiasal Azhar Rana (2022-2025)

== Academics ==
Up to Secondary Level, the College provides uniform science education; the medium of instruction being English. At higher secondary level, the students are offered the following combinations in addition to compulsory subjects:

- Pre-Engineering: Physics, Math and Chemistry.
- Pre-Medical: Physics, Biology and Chemistry.
- Computer Sciences: Computer, Math and Physics
