= Muhammad Shawez Khan =

Pakistani politician

Member of the Provincial Assembly of the Punjab
- In office 29 May 2013 – 31 May 2018

Personal details
- Born: 5 March 1953 (age 73)
- Party: Pakistan Muslim League (Nawaz)

Muhammad Shawez Khan is a Pakistani politician who remained Vice Chairman Hasan Abdal for consecutive four terms. Later he was elected Tehsil Nazim, from 2001 to 2005 and was a Member of the Provincial Assembly of the Punjab, from May 2013 to May 2018 and was given the charge of Chairperson of standing committee on Ministry of Religious Affairs and Auqaf.

== Early life and education ==
He was born on 5 March 1953.

He received matriculation level education from Government High School, Hassan Abdal in 1969.

== Political career ==
He was elected Vice-Chairman Baldiya Hasan Abdal for the consecutive four terms. Later he became Tehsil Nazim from 2001 to 2005. He became member Provincial Assembly of the Punjab as a candidate of Pakistan Muslim League (Nawaz) from Constituency PP-17 (Attock-III) in 2013 Pakistani general election.
