= Barishal Cadet College =

Military high school in Bangladesh

- বরিশাল ক্যাডেট কলেজ

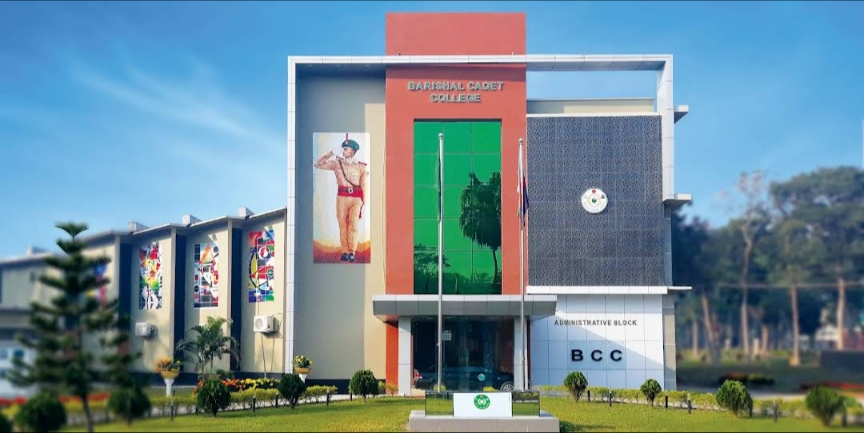
- Administrative building of Barishal Cadet College

Location
- Union: Rahmatpur; Babuganj Upazila; District: Barisal; Bangladesh; Dhaka-Barisal next to the highway; Barisal, Bangladesh, 8216; 22.78043°N 90.30630°E

Information
- Former name: Barisal Residential Model College
- Motto: পড় তোমার প্রভুর নামে (Read in the Name of Your Lord)
- Established: July 1, 1981; 45 years ago
- School board: Board of Intermediate and Secondary Education, Barisal
- Principal: Lt. Col. Tahsin Saleheen, PSC
- Adjutant: Major Md. Ali Hasan
- Language: English
- Area: 51 acres (210,000 m^{2})
- Color: Turkish Blue
- Demonym: BCCian
- First Principal: Mohammad Mofazzal Hossain
- EIIN: 100443
- Website: bcc.army.mil.bd

Barishal Cadet College is a residential military school in Babuganj, Barisal, Bangladesh, established in 1981.

== History ==
Before the independence of Bangladesh, the then East Pakistani government established four cadet colleges in the former East Pakistan that followed the British public schools' model. After independence, due to the success of those schools, the Bangladesh Armed Forces kept those colleges (which are high schools by American definition) and established eight more cadet colleges, three for girls and five for boys.

Previously, it was Barisal Residential Model College (বরিশাল আদর্শ মহাবিদ্যালয়). In 1981, the Bangladesh government converted it into a cadet college. Its first principal was Md. Mufazzal Husain who was also the project director during the initial phase of development. As a cadet college, it has numerous placements of its alumni in the national armed forces.

== Notable alumni and faculty ==
- SM Shafiuddin Ahmed, former Adjutant, former Chief of Army Staff of the Bangladesh Army
- Topu, singer
- Mashrur Arefin, alumni, writer and banker
- Md. Mahbub Hossain, alumni, Bangladesh Cabinet Secretary
- Alvi Ahmed, alumni, filmmaker and novelist

== See also ==
- List of cadet colleges in Bangladesh
