= Pabna Cadet College =

Military high school in Bangladesh

- পাবনা ক্যাডেট কলেজ
- Logo of Pabna Cadet College

Location
- Jalalpur, Pabna Sadar Upazila; Bangladesh; 24.0230°N 89.2939°E

Information
- Former name: Pabna Residential Model College
- Motto: Perseverance is Success
- Established: 7 August 1981; 45 years ago
- School board: Board of Intermediate and Secondary Education, Rajshahi
- Principal: Colonel Md Mehdi Hasan PSC
- Grades: 7–12
- Gender: Boys
- Age range: 12–18
- Enrollment: 320
- Area: 38 acres (150,000 m^{2})
- First principal: Syed Salimullah
- EIIN: 125670
- Website: pcc.army.mil.bd

Pabna Cadet College (Bengali: পাবনা ক্যাডেট কলেজ), is a residential military high school, partly financed by the Bangladesh Army, located at Jalalpur, east of Pabna town, Bangladesh.

== History ==
Pabna Cadet College was one of six cadet colleges set up in a second wave (1979–1983) after the initial four were established between 1958 and 1964, during the Pakistan era. It was created on 7 August 1981 by converting Pabna Residential Model College. It started with 170 boys of the residential school in four classes.

As of 2022, the cadet college boards 320 boys, between the ages of 12 and 18, in six classes from class VII to XII.

Cadet colleges were designed to be feeder schools for the officer academies of the armed forces, but nowadays, they are no longer reserved for students planning to pursue a career in the military.

== Campus ==
The cadet college is located on 30 acres (12 ha) on the north side of the Dhaka-Pabna highway at the village of Jalalpur in Pabna Sadar Upazila, about 10 kilometres (6.2 mi) east of Pabna.

Within the campus are a three-storey academic block, student housing, 5 full sized Basketball pitches, a swimming complex with galleries, an equipped gymnasium, 3 college level football pitches, 1 hockey ground, a dining hall and adjacent canteen, and Bir Sreshtha Nur Muhammad Hospital, named after Bir Sreshtho Lance Naik Nur Mohammad Sheikh.

== Administration ==
The Bangladesh Army provides some of the funding for cadet colleges, administers them, and runs them on a military model.
