= Mymensingh Girls' Cadet College =

Military high school in Bangladesh

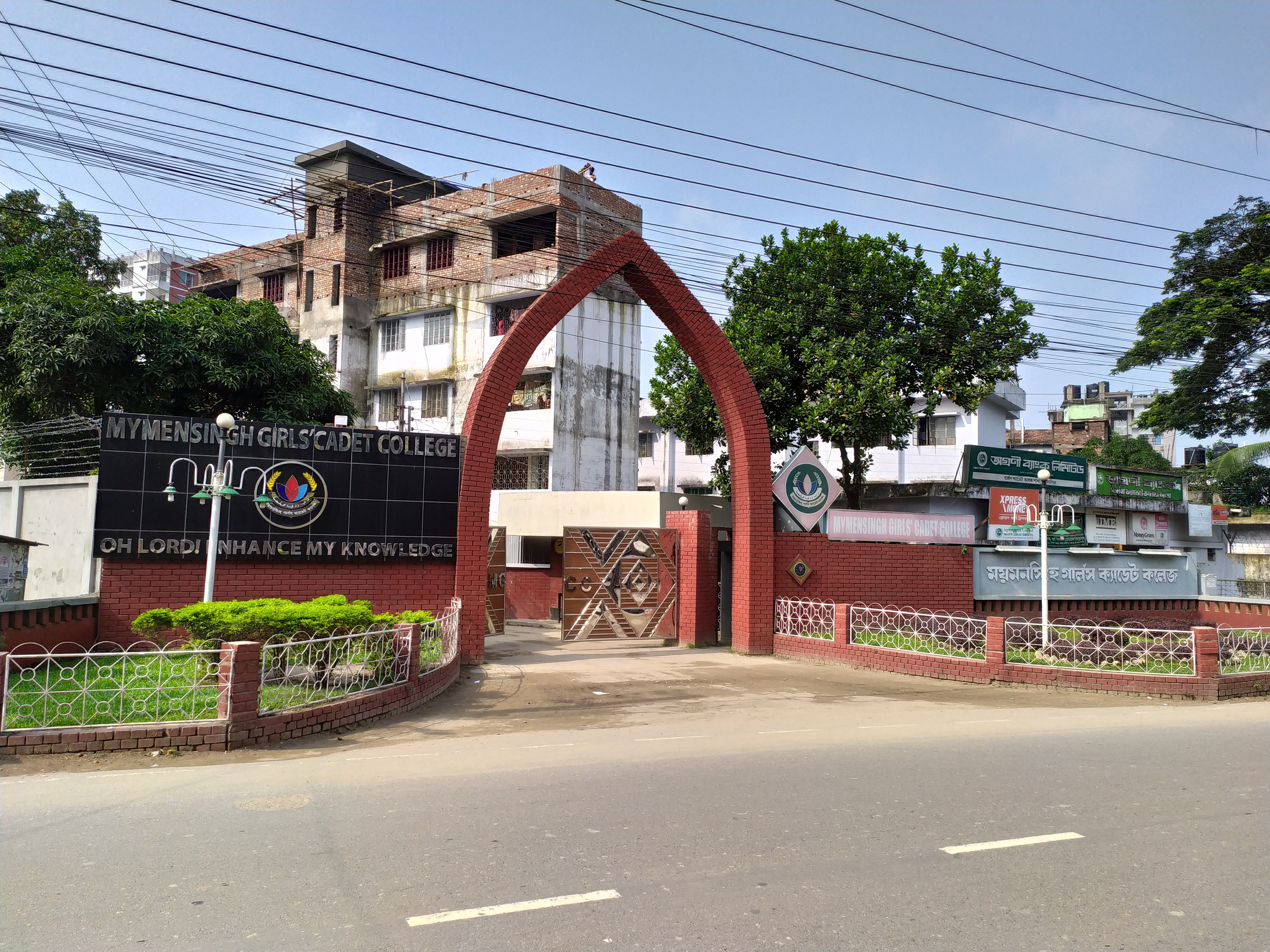
- Entrance of Mymensingh Girls' Cadet College

Location
- Shehora, near Charpara, Mymensingh Sadar, Mymensingh, Bangladesh, 2200; 24.74611°N 90.40392°E

Information
- Motto: Oh Lord! Enhance my knowledge! (বাংলা: হে আল্লাহ! আমার জ্ঞান বৃদ্ধি করো!)
- Established: 1983; 43 years ago
- School board: Board of Intermediate and Secondary Education, Mymensingh
- Principal: GP Captain Ishtiaque Ahmed Chowdhury, (s), Afwc, Psc, GD(P)
- Adjutant: Major Tasmim Rokaiya Ria
- Language: English
- Area: 25 acres (100,000 m^{2})
- Color: Olive Green
- Demonym: MGCCian
- First Principal: Karim Uddin Ahmed
- EIIN: 111926
- Website: mgcc.army.mil.bd

Mymensingh Girls' Cadet College (Bengali: ময়মনসিংহ গার্লস ক্যাডেট কলেজ, romanized: Maẏamanasinha gārlasa kyāḍēṭa kalēja) is a military high school for girls, located in Mymensingh city, Bangladesh, near Charpara. It is the first girls' cadet college in Bangladesh.

== History ==
During the United Pakistan period, the Pakistan military established cadet colleges in West Pakistan (now Pakistan) and in East Pakistan (now Bangladesh). The first cadet college in East Pakistan (present Bangladesh) Faujdarhat Cadet College was established in 1958. After the Bangladesh War of Independence in 1971, the Bangladesh Armed Forces established six more cadet colleges before 1984. Mymensingh Girls Cadet College was one of those. Mymensingh Girls' Cadet College was founded on 1 June 1982 with the first intake of cadets starting classes on 19 March 1983 under the guidance of the first principal, Karim Uddin Ahmed. It is situated in Mymensingh district, and was the first girls' cadet college in Bangladesh. Since 2006, two more Girls' Cadet Colleges have been established.

== Houses ==
House	Named after	Motto	Symbol	Colours
Sattya House	Truth	Truth is Beauty	Candle	Green
Shanti House	Peace	Know Thyself	Pigeon	Red
Shadachar House	Well Behaviour	Work is Life	Lamp	Blue

== Administration ==
=== Central administration ===
Cadet Colleges function under the Ministry of Defence. The Defense Secretary is the chairman of the Cadet College Governing Council while the Adjutant General, Bangladesh Army is the chairman of the Cadet College Governing Body. The Cadet College Section at the Adjutant General's Branch at Army Headquarters directly controls all the Cadet Colleges.

=== College administration ===
The principal of the college may be either a serving military officer of the army rank of Lieutenant Colonel, or navy or air force equivalent, or a senior officer from the Cadet College Service (promoted from the faculty members as per regulation). The vice principal is responsible for academic affairs.

A military officer of the rank of major is posted as the adjutant who is the principal's assistant and is responsible for administrative matters. Senior faculty members appointed as a House Master look after the administration of the Cadet Hostel/ Boarding House. All faculty members are attached to a Houses and are called House Tutors. The accounts officer looks after the matters relating to accounts and budget.

=== Cadet administration ===
To build leadership skills and maintain effective cadet administration, a set of cadet leaders called prefects are appointed from the cadets of the most senior class. The cadet administration works under the supervision of the college administration. The appointments are stated below:

- College Prefect
- House Prefects
- College Games Prefect
- College Cultural Prefect
- College Dining Hall Prefect
- Assistant House Prefects
- House Games Prefects
- House Cultural Prefects
- Junior Prefects (from class XI, to assist the prefects named above)

== Academics ==
Mymensingh Girls' Cadet College is one of the top educational institutions in the country academically. Like all other cadet colleges, it follows the English version of the National Curriculum as prescribed by the National Curriculum and Textbook Board. The cadet college education begins in the 7th grade and ends with the 12th grade. The number of cadets in each grade is no more than 50. Cadets undertake the Junior School Certificate (JSC), Secondary School Certificate (SSC) and Higher Secondary Certificate (HSC) examinations.

== Extra-curricular activities ==
=== Cultural activities ===
The cadet college education includes various cultural activities for the cadets to explore their wider potential. Throughout the year, different inter-house performance competitions are held: Qirat, Poetry Recitation (Bengali and English), Extempore Speech (Bengali and English), Debate (Bengali and English), Elocution (Bengali and English), General Knowledge, Current affairs, Music, Dance, and Painting competitions. Further, the inter-house Wall Magazine (Bengali and English) competitions are also held. The three houses organise their own house cultural nights each term. On the basis of the results of different competitions, the champion and runner-up houses are awarded trophies.

== Academic achievements ==
More than 98% of the cadets get A+ in JSC, SSC and HSC. In 2001, only 76 examinees in SSC secured GPA 5 in the whole country, and out of them, 23 were from Mymensingh Girls' Cadet College. This college is at the top of regional rankings for certificate examinations in the Dhaka area: 5th position in 2013, 3rd in 2012, 2nd in 2011 and 1st position in 2010 in the HSC. It also achieved 6th position in 2013, 9th in 2012, 8th in 2011, and 5th place in 2010 in the SSC examination Dhaka Education Board. In the Junior School Certificate examination, within the region, the school secured 2nd position in 2012, 6th in 2011, and 9th place in 2010.
