= Joypurhat Girls' Cadet College =

Military high school in Bangladesh

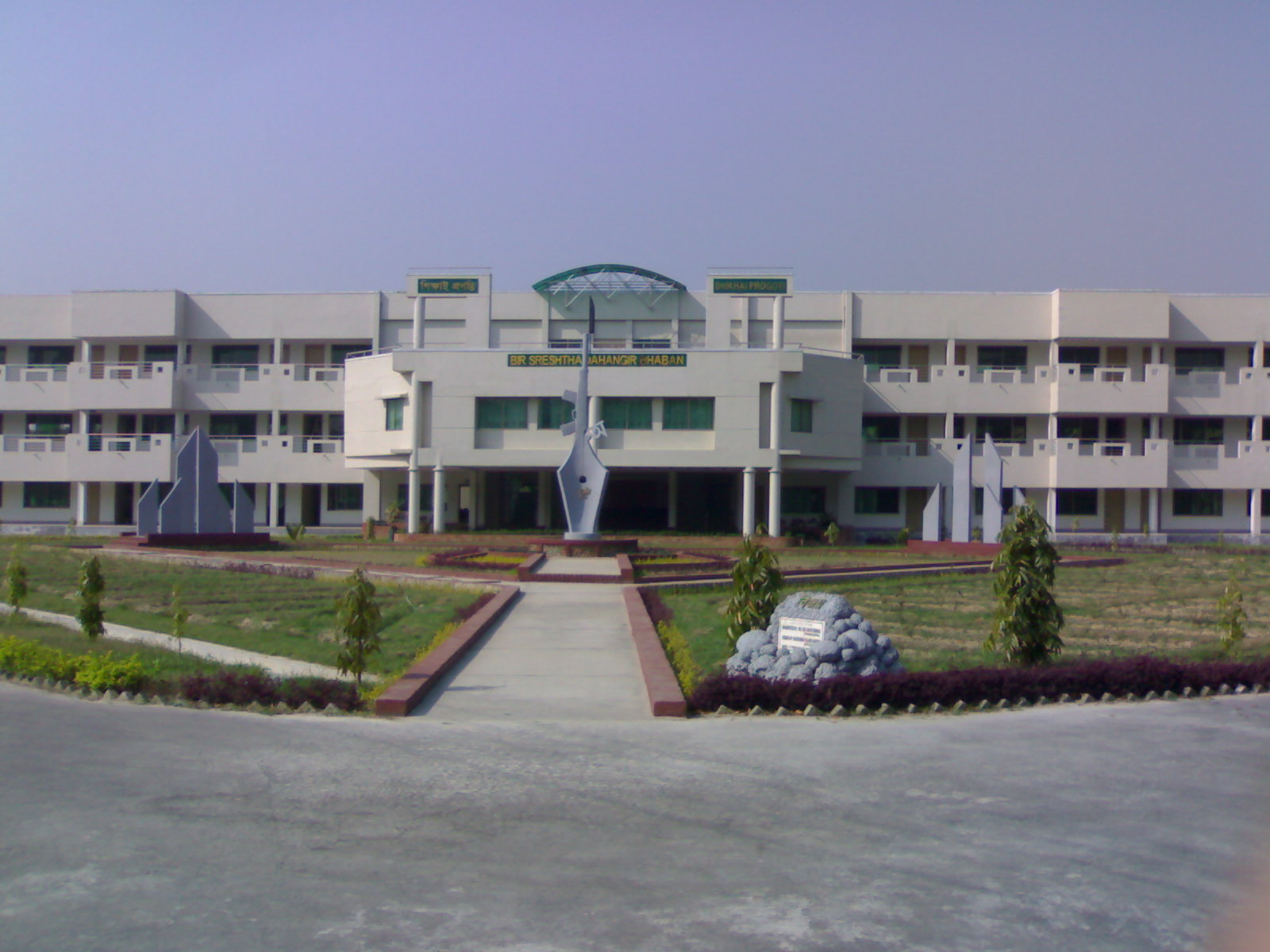
- Academic block

Location
- Joypurhat; Joypurhat, Bangladesh, 5900; 25.0984°N 89.0064°E

Information
- Motto: শিক্ষাই প্রগতি (Education is progress)
- Established: July 16, 2006; 20 years ago
- School board: Board of Intermediate and Secondary Education, Rajshahi
- Principal: Md. Yeasin Md. Yeasin, Principal of JGCC
- Adjutant: Major Nadia Nusrat
- Language: English
- Area: 57 acres (230,000 m^{2})
- Color: Green
- Demonym: JGCCian
- First Principal: Md. Abu Said Biswas
- EIIN: 132222
- Website: jgcc.army.mil.bd

Joypurhat Girls' Cadet College (Bengali: জয়পুরহাট গার্লস ক্যাডেট কলেজ) is a military high school for girls, located in Joypurhat District, Bangladesh. Cadet colleges in Bangladesh are under the auspices of the Ministry of Defence. Inaugurated in 2006, the college occupies 57 acres (230,000 m^{2}) of land and has the capacity for 326 students. Joypurhat Girls' Cadet College is one of three girls' cadet colleges and nine boys cadet colleges in Bangladesh. It is the newest of all the cadet colleges.

== Administration ==
=== Central administration ===
Cadet colleges in the country function under the Ministry of Defence.

== Academic system ==
Cadets are enrolled in class 7 or 8 of Bangladesh National Curriculum and continue their study for six years up to the end of higher secondary or college level (high school in international standard). They follow the English version syllabus of the National Curriculum and Textbook Board.

Joypurhat Girls' Cadet College placed within the top 10 institutions under the Rajshahi Board of Intermediate and Secondary Education in terms of Secondary School Certificate exam results in 2010.

== Faculty and staff ==
=== Departments ===
- Physics
  - Assistant Professor, Mr. Alamgir Mia, MSc
    (Department of Physics, University of Chittagong)
  - Lecturer, Mr. Bhupati Barma, MSc
    (Department of Physics, University of Dhaka)

Bhupati Barma

  - Lecturer, Mr. Farhabi Mojib, MSc
    (Department of Physics, University of Dhaka)

Farhabi Mojib

- Chemistry
- Biology
- Mathematics
- Bengali
- English
- Home Economics
- Political Science:
  - Lecturer, Md. Zahid Hossain, MSS, BSS (Honors)
- History:
  - Lecturer, Md. Abir Haider, MA, BA (Honors)

Abir Hider

- Economics
- Islamic Studies
- Arts and Crafts
- Geography
  - Lecturer, Md. Mahmud Hasan
  - Lecturer, Fatema Ferdous
- Information and communications technology (ICT)
  - Lecturer Md. Amin Kaiser

Amin Kaiser

== See also ==
- Cadet Colleges in Bangladesh
