= List of cadet colleges in Pakistan =

Pakistani military prep schools

This is a list of cadet colleges in Pakistan. They are military high schools which prepare students for the armed forces.

== History ==
In Pakistan the system of cadet colleges was introduced by the then president of Pakistan Field Marshal Ayub Khan. The first cadet college was built in Punjab in 1954. The initial four cadet colleges were Cadet College Hasan Abdal, Cadet College Kohat, Faujdarhat Cadet College (then East Pakistan, now in Bangladesh) and Cadet College Petaro.

== Islamabad ==
Name	Established	Enrolment
Cadet College Ghora Gali		
Cadet College Humak		

== Balochistan ==
Name	Established	Enrolment
Cadet College Mastung	1987	
Balochistan Residential College Turbat	1994	
Balochistan Residential College Loralai	1994	
Balochistan Residential College Khuzdar	1994	
Cadet College Kohlu	2005	
Cadet College Jaffarabad	2009	
Cadet College Dera Bugti	2011	
Cadet College Panjgur	2012	
PN Cadet College Ormara Gwadar	2013	
Cadet College Hub	2015	
Balochistan Residential College Zhob	2016	
Balochistan Residential College Uthal Lasbela	2016	
Sheikha Fatima Bint Mubarak Girls Cadet College Turbat	2018	
Girls Cadet College Quetta	2021	
Cadet College Awaran	2022	
Cadet College Qilla Saifullah	2024	

== Khyber Pakhtunkhwa ==
Name	Established	Enrolment
Cadet College Kohat	1964	
Cadet College Razmak North Waziristan	1978	
Garrison Cadet College Kohat	1993	
Pakistan Scouts Cadet College Batrasi	1996	
WAPDA Cadet College Tarbela Haripur	2004	
Cadet College Mohmand	2005	
Frontier Scouts Cadet College Warsak	2009	
Karnal Sher Khan Cadet College Swabi	2011	120 seats
Cadet College Wana South Waziristan	2011	
Cadet College Swat	2011	150 seats
Cadet College Spinkai	2012	
Girls Cadet College Mardan	2017	

== Punjab ==
In total, there are 6 Cadet Colleges in Punjab which are being run under the government control.

Name	Established	Enrolment
Cadet College Hasan Abdal	1952	
Cadet College Okara	2011	
Cadet College Pasrur Sialkot	2011	
Cadet College Choa Saiden Shah, Chakwal	2011	
Punjab Rangers Cadet College Chakri Rawalpindi	2020	
Cadet College Esa Khel, Mianwali	2020	
PN Cadet College Khan Pur, Rahim Yar Khan	2026	

== Sindh ==
Name	Established	Enrolment
Cadet College Petaro	1957	
Cadet College Pak Steel, Bin Qasim	1982	
Cadet College Pano Aqil	1992	
PN Cadet College Sanghar	1994	
Cadet College Larkana	1994	
Cadet College Khairpur	2000	
Bakhtawar Cadet College For Girls Shaheed Benazirabad	2010	
Cadet College Gadap Town, Karachi	2010	
Cadet College Ghotki	2010	
Shaheed Benazir Bhutto Girls Cadet College Larkana	2010	
Cadet College Kakar (Dadu)	2010	
Cadet College Karampur (Kandhkot)	2010	
Cadet College Mithi	2012	

== Gilgit Baltistan ==
Name	Established	Enrolment
Cadet College Chilas		
Cadet College Skardu		

== Naval colleges ==
- PN College of Engineering Science & Technology Karachi
- PN Nursing College Karachi
- Submarine Services College Karachi
- Swimming & Diving College Manora
- PN Cadet College Ormara
- PN Cadet College Sanghar
- PN Cadet College Khanpur Rahimyar Khan

== Military Colleges ==
- Military College Jhelum
- Military College Murree
- Military College Sui
- Army Burn Hall College

== PAF Colleges ==
- PAF College Lower Topa
- PAF College Sargodha

== See also ==
- List of cadet colleges in Bangladesh
- Dholpur Military School
- Sainik School
- National Cadet Corps (Pakistan)
