= Cantonment (Pakistan) =

Permanent military bases of the Pakistan Army

Cantonment (Pakistan) چھاؤنی، پاکستان
- Permanent military cantonment
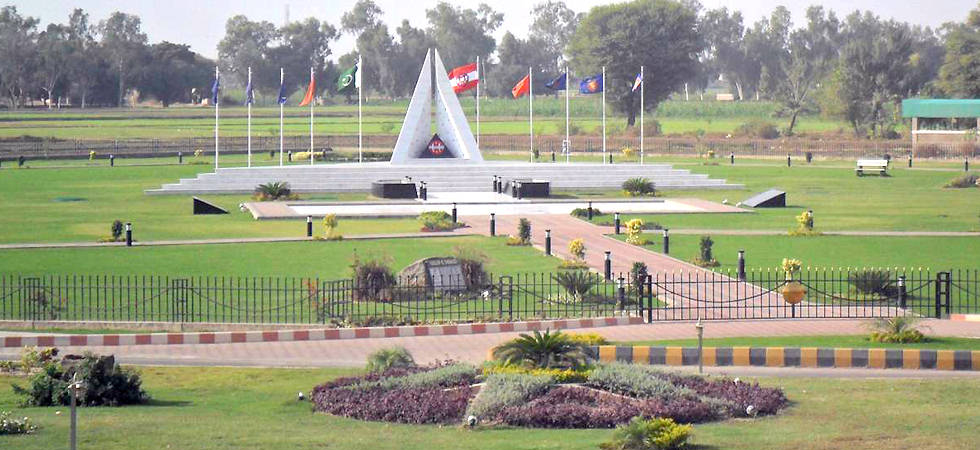
- Country: Pakistan
- Established under Cantonments Act: 1924

Government
  - Type: Cantonment Board (under ML&C, Ministry of Defence)

Cantonments in Pakistan (Urdu: چھاؤنی، پاکستان) are permanent bases of the Pakistan Armed Forces, which are administered by Cantonment Boards under the control of the Military Lands & Cantonments Department (ML&C), Ministry of Defence, Government of Pakistan. Cantonments are established under and governed by the Cantonments Act 1924.

In recent times, the demographic character of most independence-era cantonments has changed, as they are no longer primarily "garrison" areas, and include significant civilian populations and private businesses. Based on the strength of civil population, the cantonments have been divided into three classes. Class I Cantonments, in which the civil population is 100,000 or more; Class II Cantonments, in which the civil population is 50,000 or more but less than 100,000; and Class III Cantonments, in which the civil population is less than 50,000.

There are a total of 56 Cantonments in Pakistan. As of 2013, the greatest number, 27, is in Punjab, then 10 in Khyber Pakhtunkhwa and Sindh, 7 in Balochistan and 2 in Gilgit Baltistan.

== Administration of cantonments ==
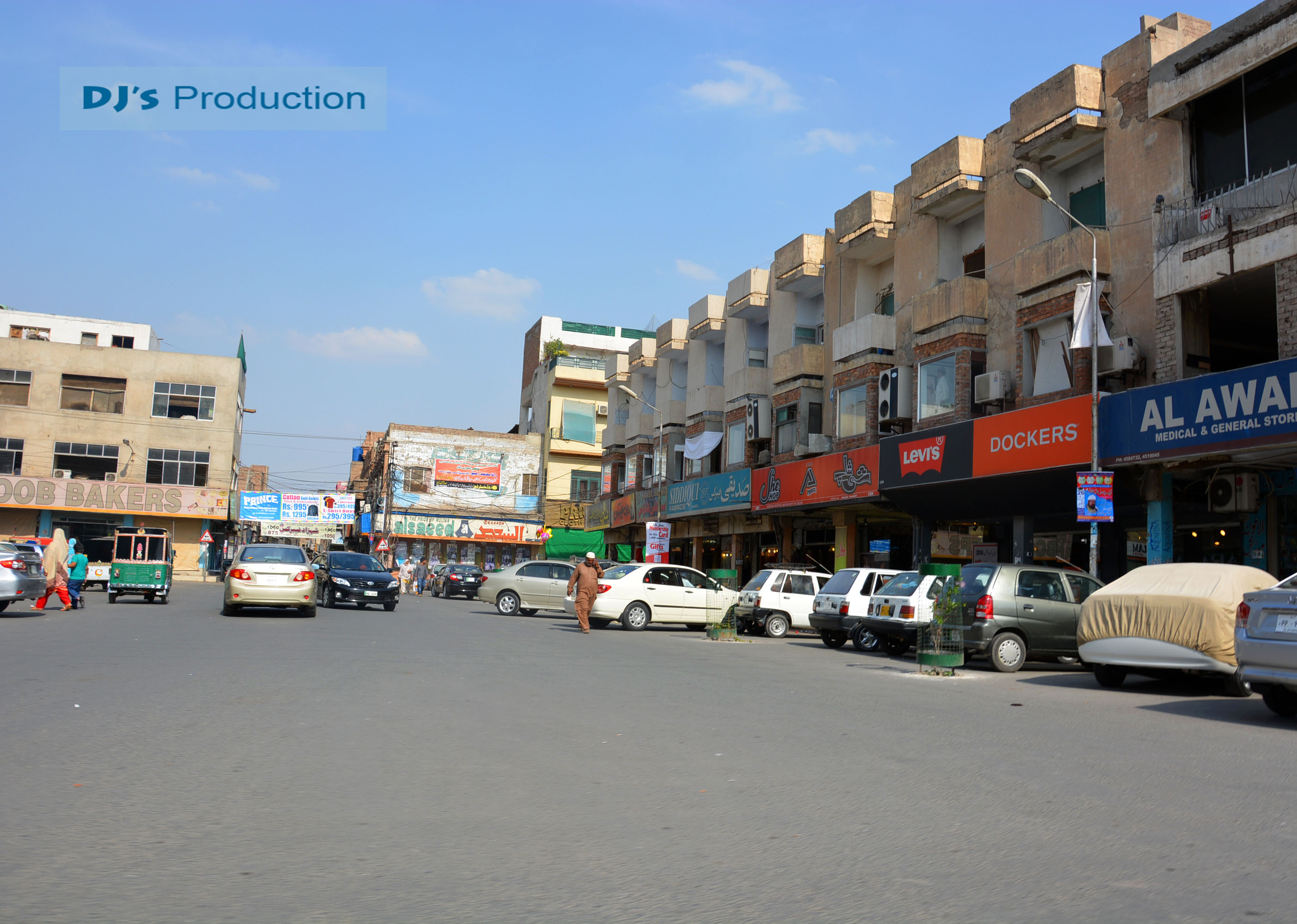
Sadar Bazaar in Multan Cantonment

Prior to 1864, cantonments used to be administered by military authorities under various government orders. In 1864, for the first time, an act was adopted for improving the administration of the cantonments. A magistrate was appointed to administer the area. The act also regulated the funds granted by Government for the purpose of bettering the various facilities.

In 1880, another act was passed that empowered the cantonment authority to impose taxes, as well as granting legal status to the cantonment committee. The act gave power to impose fines and penalties for non-payment of taxes, and for encroachments. After World War I, political changes took place in South Asia that affected the administration of the cantonments. The changes also became part of day-to-day life in cantonments, as it had to do with its working.

The Cantonments Act of 1924 was a landmark in the history of cantonments, as it brought in its wake some sweeping changes. The act introduced the representative local government system, under which elected representative of the civil population became members of the Cantonment Boards. The boards were created as autonomous statutory local bodies for providing civil services. The powers and functions of the Cantonment Board are synonymous to Municipal Committees in the cities. The members constituting the board are both officially nominated as well as elected through a direct vote on the basis of adult franchise. Officials nominated as members hold the majority. The station commander, a senior military officer, is the ex officio president of the board. This is to protect the interest of troops, and ensure their welfare and discipline.

The administration of cantonments and management of the military lands inside and outside the cantonments is centrally controlled and supervised by the Military Lands and Cantonments Department, which is an attached department of the Ministry of Defense headed by a director general Hassan Raza Maneka. The post of MLC director general is purely civilian, but a serving major general has been appointed on it. Army captured the post after former president Pervez Musharraf's 1999 coup. Since then, the post has been doled out to serving majors general in violation of civil service rules. Maj-Gen Javed Iqbal was the first army officer to be appointed on the coveted post. Qazi Naeem Ahmad was the last civilian served as DG Military Lands and Cantonments. The director general is assisted by an additional director Ahmad Hamza Khan and a deputy director Ali Hassan at the headquarters. In addition, five Regional Deputy Directors based at Peshawar, Rawalpindi, Lahore, Karachi and Quetta supervise the respective cantonment boards in their jurisdiction. The Cantonment Executive Officer Faisal Masood is the principal executive at the local level. The board normally decides and lays down policies, while the executive officer executes these policies. He is the chief exponent of the board’s policies. He acts as an adviser and is a permanent officer specially trained in local administration. He is empowered to carry out the policies and decisions and ensure adherence to the various laws and bylaws. The presence of elected members in the board has a salutary effect, and is most beneficial for the civilian residents because the elected members are the medium to convey their views. The elected members play an important role in the development of public services in their respective areas. Development works are usually carried out in consultation with the respective elected members. Major development schemes are finalized in the budget meeting held before the beginning of the fiscal year, with the consent of all the members.

The Cantonment Board is an organ of the local government and is free to formulate policies for local development within the frame work of the Cantonments Act and other government regulations. The board ordinarily holds one meeting each month. All matters are decided by majority, but in case of a tie, the matter is decided through the president's vote. All meetings of the board are open meetings, unless specifically directed otherwise by the president of the board.

All Cantonments Boards work under the administrative control of the director general of Military Lands and Cantonments. The director general may issue various directives on important policy matters, and the Cantonment Boards comply with the same. All accounts are audited annually by the Audit Department of the Government of Pakistan.

== Local government and elections ==
Local government elections have not been held in the cantonments since year 2000 in Pakistan. The absence of local government across the various cantonments board in Pakistan was challenged in the Supreme Court of Pakistan in 2009. The Government of Pakistan has responded by stating that changes to the Cantonment Boards Act of 1924 are pending at the National Assembly of Pakistan, as of 2014. Many of the identified anomalies in the existing Act of 1924 are in direct conflict with the Constitution of Pakistan. The Government of Pakistan has responded by saying that:

"The presence of a number of laws (the Cantonment Act 1924 [sic], the Cantonment Local Government Election Ordinance 2002 and the Cantonment Ordinance 2002) made it difficult to hold free and fair elections in the areas as required by the Constitution."

The Provincial governments are bound by law to announce a date for local elections in consultation with the Election Commission of Pakistan once the legal challenges have been resolved. The last election was held in the month of September 2021 throughout Pakistan.

== List of cantonments in Pakistan ==
=== Balochistan Province ===
- Chaman Cantonment
- Khuzdar Cantonment
- Loralai Cantonment
- Ormara Cantonment
- Quetta Cantonment
- Zhob Cantonment
- Gwadar Cantonment
- Turbat Cantonment
- Sibi Cantonment
- Pasni Cantonment

=== Khyber Pakhtunkhwa Province ===
- Abbottabad Cantonment
- Bannu Cantonment
- Cherat Cantonment
- Dera Ismail Khan Cantonment
- Havelian Cantonment
- Kohat Cantonment
- Mardan Cantonment
- Nowshera Cantonment
- Peshawar Cantonment
- Risalpur Cantonment
- Swat Cantonment
- Tarbela Cantonment
- Kalabagh Cantonment, Nathia Gali

=== Punjab Province ===
- Gujranwala Cantonment
- Attock Cantonment
- Attock Fort Cantonment
- Bhawalpur Cantonment
- Rahim Yar Khan Cantonment
- Chaklala Cantonment
- D.G.Khan Cantonment
- Jalalpur Jattan Cantonment
- Jhelum Cantonment
- Kamra Cantonment
- Kharian Cantonment
- Kirana Cantonment, Sargodha
- Lahore Cantonment
- Mangla Cantonment
- Mansar Cantonment
- Marala Cantonment
- Multan Cantonment
- Murree Hills Cantonment
- Mailsi Cantonment
- Okara Cantonment
- Qadirabad Cantonment
- Rawalpindi Cantonment
- Sanjwal Cantonment
- Sargodha Cantonment
- Shorkot Cantonment
- Sialkot Cantonment
- Taxila Cantonment
- Wah Cantonment
- Walton Cantonment
- Chunian Cantonment
- Khanewal Cantonment

=== Sindh Province ===
- Chhor, Sindh Cantonment
- Clifton Cantonment, Karachi
- Faisal Cantonment, Karachi
- Hyderabad Cantonment
- Karachi Cantonment
- Korangi Creek Cantonment, Karachi
- Kashmor Cantonment
- Malir Cantonment, Karachi
- Manora Cantonment, Karachi
- Pano Aqil Cantonment
- Petaro Cantonment
- Badin Cantonment
- Jacobabad Cantonment

=== Gilgit Baltistan ===
- Gilgit Cantonment
- Skardu Cantonment
- Rattu Cantonment

== See also ==
- Cantonment
