= Cadet College Kohat =

Cadet college in Pakistan

Coordinates: 33°32′32″N 71°30′48″E

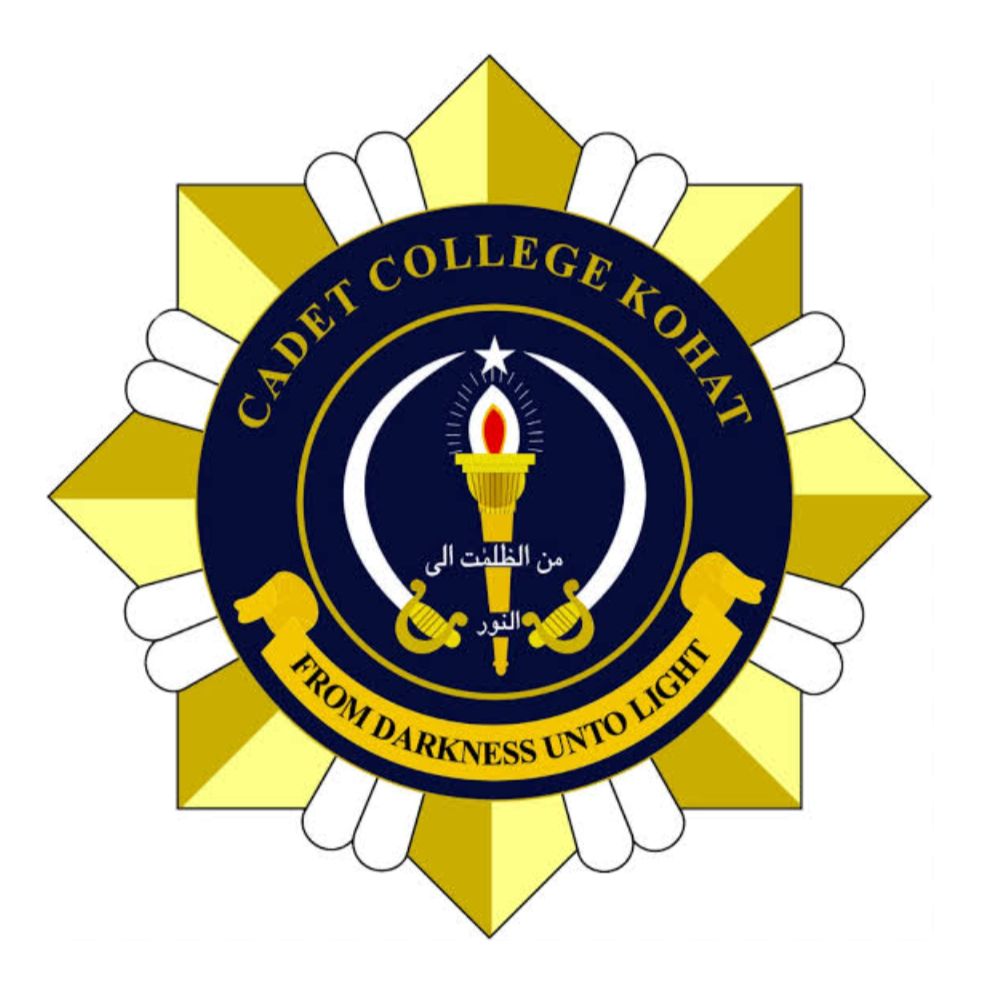
- Outskirts of Kohat City, Khyber-Pakhtunkhwa, Pakistan

Information
- Motto: من الظلمات إلى النور; From Darkness Unto Light
- Established: 1965
- Principal: Brig(R) Tufail Muhammad Khan (SI)M
- Area: 144 acres (1152 kanal)
- Colour: Navy blue
- Demonym: Kohatians
- Houses: 7
- Website: www.cck.edu.pk

Cadet College Kohat (Urdu: کیڈٹ کالج کوہاٹ) is a residential college located on the outskirts of Kohat, in Khyber Pakhtunkhwa province, Pakistan.

== History ==
The foundation stone of Cadet College Kohat was laid by Governor West Pakistan, Malik Amir Muhammad Khan on 19 April 1964. The first entry of 58 cadets was inducted in 8th class in April 1965 in Jinnah House. Lt Col (Retd) Faizullah Khan Khattak was the founder Principal of this premier residential academic institution. Although the College does not prepare cadets purely for military career, yet in 1971 out of 107 cadets, 95 were selected for Commission in Defence Forces-a record percentage of success achieved by any single educational institution in the country. However, a large number of cadets also opt for professions such as medical, engineering, business management and civil services etc. Ever since its inception, the College has displayed outstanding results in SSC and HSSC Board Examinations. The College has bagged a number of Presidential Awards for academic excellence besides excelling in co-curricular and extra- curricular activities.

The first entry of cadets was accepted in April 1965. Academic work started with 58 cadets and one boarding house called Jinnah House. Lt. Col. (Retd.) Faizullah Khattak (late) was its founding Principal.

== Admin block ==
Cadet College Kohat has a large body of administration. This body of administration has its offices in Admin Block. Adjacent to admin block is the Principal's office. Admin Block has the following offices:

- Vice Principal
- Senior House Master
- Director of Studies
- Controller of Examination
- Adjutant
- Deputy Director of Finance

== Houses ==
- Jinnah House
- Khushal House
- Iqbal House
- Ayub House
- Munawar House
- Rustam House
- Junior House(8th)

== Board of governors ==
Members of the board of governors as of 2018 were:

- Patron-in-Chief: Chief Minister of Khyber Pakhtunkhwa
- GOC 9 Division, Kohat - Chairman
- Kohatian - Member
- Major General (RETD) Salah Ud Din, Ex-Cadet - Member
- Base Commander, PAF Base Kohat - Member
- Director HRD, GHQ, Rawalpindi - Member
- Director Naval Educational Services, NHQ, Islamabad - Member
- Secretary Finance KPK, Peshawar - Member
- Secretary Schools & Literacy NWFP - Member
- Deputy Commissioner, Kohat - Member
- Principal Cadet College Kohat - Secretary

== Academic block ==
Cadet College Kohat has double story academic block. Academic Block consists of classrooms, assembly hall (Faizullah Khan Auditorium), Chemistry laboratory, Physics Laboratory (Dr. A. Q. Khan Laboratory), Biology Laboratory and Language Lab. It also has a staff room.

== Multimedia block ==
It houses Khursheed digital library, a computer lab, an audio-visual lab and various break out rooms for e-learning activities.

== Infrastructure ==
The college is spread over an area of about 144 acres (0.58 km^{2}). The buildings comprise an Academic Block, Admin Block, Multimedia block, seven boarding houses (spread around the Academic Block in a semicircular shape), three messes, a mosque, a gymnasium, a cafeteria, a swimming pool, a ten-bed hospital, several sports fields including nine football grounds, seven hockey fields, two cricket pitches, six basketball courts, three volleyball courts and two squash courts. The college has residential accommodation for the teaching and administrative staff.

== Library ==
Cadet College Kohat has a rich collection of books in its library named "Khursheed Library"; named after then Principal, Mirza Khurshid Anwar Beg. Under the supervision of a qualified Librarian, the library is providing services to 542 Cadets and 230 College employees. Total Collection of the library is 30,000 books, including Islamic, Reference, Computer, History, Science and Arts Books. Similarly to provide the latest information and to improve the English language of the Cadets, English & Urdu magazines, Journals, Digests, Newspapers etc., of National and International level have also been subscribed for the library. An audio-visual library has been set up with the latest equipment to acquaint the cadets with modern techniques of learning.

== Mosques and church ==
The college has two mosques and a church. One mosque has recently been renovated. More than 1000 people can pray/accommodate in Masjid Hall.

== Hospital ==
The college has a twenty-bed hospital along with two isolation rooms for special cases. A full-time medical officer assisted by two dispensers look after the health of cadets. The college hospital has its own ambulance. Cadets are referred to C.M.H. Kohat for medical treatment as well. Dr Rizwan Khan is currently the senior medical officer of college hospital who is assisted by two Medical assistants who are well qualified in taking care of the cadets Health.

== Notable alumni ==
- Asif Sandila, Chief of Naval Staff
- Anwaar ul Haq Kakar, Prime Minister of Pakistan (Caretaker)
- Muhammad Ibrahim Khan, Chief Justice of Peshawar High Court.
- Shibli Faraz, former Leader of Senate, former federal minister, current "Opposition leader of Senate of Pakistan"
- Vice Admiral (R) Tehseen Ullah
- Brig(retd) Gulistan Janjua, Ex-Governor KPK
- Engr. Shaukatullah Khan, Ex-Governor KPK
- Iqbal Zafar Jhagra, Governor KPK
- Deputy Inspector General of Police Malik Muhammad Saad Khan Shahee
- Air Vice Marshal Ahmed Hassan, Deputy Chief of Air Staff, Engineering (DCAS-E), AHQ
- Atif Khan, education minister KPK, Provincial Minister of Khyber Pakhtunkhwa for Tourism, Culture, Sports, Archaeology and Youth Affairs

== See also ==
- Army Burn Hall College
- Military College Jhelum
- PAF Public School Sargodha
- PAF Public School Lower Topa
- Garrison Cadet College Kohat
- Cadet College Petaro
- Cadet College Hasan Abdal
- Cadet College Swat
