= Sialkot Cantonment =

Military cantonment in Punjab, Pakistan

Sialkot Cantonment سیالکوٹ چھاؤنی
- Cantonment
- Interactive map of Sialkot Cantonment
- Coordinates: 32°31′22″N 74°33′31″E
- Country: Pakistan
- Province: (Punjab, Pakistan) Punjab
- Division: Gujranwala Division
- District: Sialkot District
- Established: 1852

Government
  - Body: Sialkot Cantonment Board

Area
  - Total: 27.445 km^{2} (10.597 sq mi)

Population (2017)
  - Total: 64,126
- Website: sialkot.cantonment.gov.pk

Sialkot Cantonment (Urdu: سیالکوٹ چھاؤنی) is a military cantonment adjacent to the city of Sialkot in northeastern Punjab, Pakistan. Established in 1852 by the British Indian Army, it is one of the earliest permanent garrisons founded in Punjab following the British annexation of the region after the Second Anglo-Sikh War. The cantonment covers approximately 27.4 km² (6,782 acres) and recorded a population of 64,126 at the 2017 census. It is governed by the Sialkot Cantonment Board under the Cantonments Act 1924, independently of the Sialkot District civil administration.

== History ==
=== Establishment, 1849–1852 ===
Sialkot District was incorporated into British India following the defeat of the Sikh Empire in the Second Anglo-Sikh War of 1848–49. A temporary garrison was maintained at Wazirabad from 1849 while a permanent site was selected. In 1851, Sir Charles Napier, then Commander-in-Chief, India, selected a site between two seasonal watercourses north of Sialkot city for a permanent cantonment. The garrison was transferred from Wazirabad to Sialkot in 1852, when the Brigade Headquarters was constituted there.

The 1895 Gazetteer of the Sialkot District records the station as situated approximately five miles from the border with the princely state of Jammu and Kashmir and notes the cantonment as the headquarters of the district's principal military establishment.

=== Indian Rebellion of 1857 ===
On 9 July 1857, during the Indian Rebellion of 1857, a brigade of Bengal Army sepoys stationed at Sialkot mutinied and marched toward Delhi. The mutineers sacked the district treasury and destroyed administrative records before departing; European inhabitants sought refuge in the old Sikh fort overlooking the city. The column was intercepted by Brigadier John Nicholson as it attempted to cross the Ravi River at Trimmu Ghat, where it was defeated between 12 and 16 July 1857.

=== Post-1857 to Partition ===
After the dissolution of the East India Company under the Government of India Act 1858, Sialkot Cantonment continued as a garrison within the reorganised British Indian Army. By the early twentieth century it was the headquarters of a brigade in the 2nd Division of the Northern Army. A commercial bazaar area within the cantonment, covering 173.49 acres, was formally notified under Section 43-A of the Cantonments Act 1924 by Government of India Notification No. 053 of 22 May 1937.

At Partition in August 1947, Sialkot District fell within the boundaries assigned to Pakistan under the Radcliffe Award. The cantonment and its infrastructure were transferred to the newly constituted Pakistan Army. The bazaar-area notification was superseded and re-declared under Pakistani authority by Ministry of Defence Notification No. 789/56 of 24 August 1956.

=== Indo-Pakistani War of 1965 ===
During the Indo-Pakistani War of 1965, Indian forces launched the Sialkot campaign in September 1965 with the objective of crossing the international border and advancing toward the Marala–Ravi Link Canal. Pakistani forces checked the Indian advance at Chawinda, approximately 25 km (16 mi) south of the cantonment, in what became known as the Battle of Chawinda. A ceasefire mandated by the United Nations Security Council on 23 September 1965 ended hostilities. In 1966, the Government of Pakistan awarded the Hilal-e-Istaqlal to the city of Sialkot, along with Lahore and Sargodha, in recognition of the conduct of their civilian populations during the war.

== Geography ==
Sialkot Cantonment lies in the northeastern corner of Punjab province within Sialkot District, which falls under Gujranwala Division. It is adjacent to the north and northwest of Sialkot city. The 1895 Gazetteer records the station as approximately five miles from the border with the former princely state of Jammu and Kashmir.

The cantonment is bounded to the north by Nullah Palkhu and to the south by Nullah Bhed, two seasonal watercourses originating in the Jammu hills that drain westward across the Punjab plains. The terrain is low-lying alluvial plain within the Ravi–Chenab interfluve (doab), which the 1895 Gazetteer describes as among the most fertile in Punjab.

== Administration ==
The Sialkot Cantonment Board (SCB) is the statutory local body responsible for civic administration within the cantonment. It operates under the Cantonments Act 1924, which places all cantonment boards in Pakistan under the supervisory authority of the Military Lands and Cantonments Department (ML&C), an attached department of the Ministry of Defence.

The Board covers a total area of 27.4 km², incorporating four designated bazaar areas. Under the Act, membership of the Board comprises both officially nominated members, who hold the majority, and elected representatives of the civil population returned by adult franchise. The Station Commander, a senior military officer, serves as ex officio President of the Board. The Cantonment Executive Officer is the principal administrative officer at the local level, responsible for implementing Board decisions and managing day-to-day civic services.

The cantonment falls outside the jurisdiction of Sialkot District government and the Sialkot Municipal Corporation. Residents within the cantonment's civil areas are subject to SCB authority for property registration, building permits, sanitation, and public works under the Cantonments Act 1924.

== Demographics ==
According to the 2017 census conducted by the Pakistan Bureau of Statistics, Sialkot Cantonment had a population of 64,126, of whom 41,406 were male and 22,708 were female. The 1998 census had recorded 63,126 residents, reflecting a negligible growth rate of 0.08 per cent per annum over the intercensal period.

== Infrastructure ==
=== Bazaar areas ===
The cantonment contains four designated bazaar areas governed under Section 43-A of the Cantonments Act 1924. The principal area, covering 173.49 acres, was first gazetted in 1937 under Government of India authority and re-notified under Pakistani authority in 1956.

=== Airport ===
Sialkot Cantonment Airport is a small military airport for Mushshak and Cessna planes and helicopters in Sialkot, Punjab, Pakistan. It is located on Cantonment Road adjacent to Garrison Park. During 1995–1996, it was also used as a public airport for Pakistan International Airlines helicopter service from and to Islamabad.

== Economy ==
Sialkot city is a centre of Pakistan's export manufacturing sector. The 1895 Gazetteer records the town's trade in sporting implements, boots, paper, and cotton cloth, identifying metalwork as a defining local industry alongside the cantonment's military function. Surgical instruments were being manufactured in Sialkot for distribution throughout British India by the 1920s.

Commercial activity within the cantonment is regulated by the Sialkot Cantonment Board under the Cantonments Act 1924, which empowers the Board to impose property taxes and regulate land use within the cantonment perimeter.

== See also ==
- Cantonment (Pakistan)
- Sialkot Cantonment Board
- Sialkot
- Battle of Chawinda
