= Peshawar Cantonment =

Peshawar Cantonment پشاور چھاؤنی
- Cantonment
- Location within Khyber Pakhtunkhwa Location within Pakistan
- Coordinates: 34°00′02″N 71°32′13″E
- Country: Pakistan
- Province: Khyber Pakhtunkhwa
- City District: Peshawar
- Established: 1868

Government
  - Type: Cantonment Board

Population (2017)
  - Total: 70,741
- Time zone: UTC+5 (PST)
- Website: https://www.cbp.gov.pk

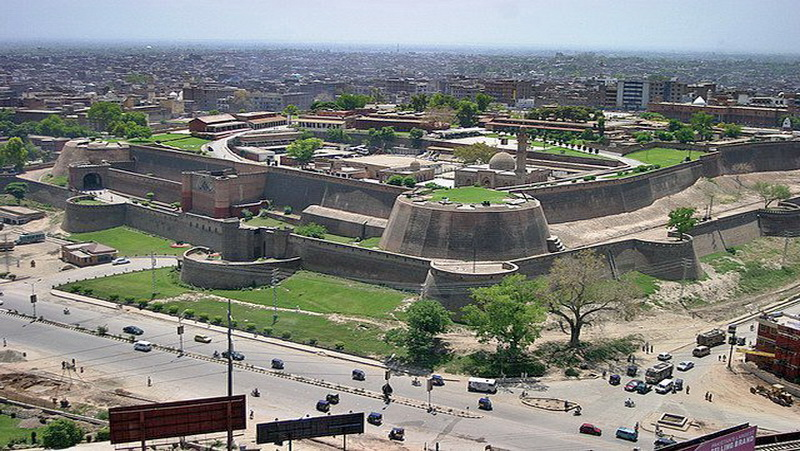
Bala Hisar Fort, Peshawar Cantt

Peshawar Cantonment (Urdu: پشاور چھاؤنی, Pashto: د پیښور کنډک) is a garrison located in Peshawar, Khyber Pakhtunkhwa, Pakistan. Although the cantonment is located within Peshawar City District, it is an independent municipality under control of the Military Lands and Cantonments Department of the Ministry of Defence. It also hosts the historic Kalibari temple

Popular areas in the Cantonment are Garrison Rangers Club, Army Stadium Park, Peshawar Services Club, Serena Hotel, Food court, PAF Hospital and others. Peshawar Cantonment is under the rule of the Pakistan Army.

== History ==
The Peshawar Cantonment was established on the remains of old town site and the graveyard. It was as irregular and oblong in shape as it is today and originally occupied an area of 09 square kilometers. It was occupied by British troops soon after the British annexation of Punjab in 1848–49. After the fall of the Sikh Empire in 1849 and annexation of Punjab to the British Empire, a Military Garrison was established at Peshawar in 1868 by the British colonial authorities on the remains of old town site and ancient grave yards. Peshawar Cantonment now covers an area of 13.64 Sq. Kilometers and is currently under the control of the Pakistan Army.

== Military ==
Peshawar Cantonment serves as the headquarters of XI Corps.
