= Cadet College Petaro =

Military boarding school in Pakistan

Location
- Petaro-76120, Sindh. Petaro is situated about 30 km from Hyderabad.
- 25.541°N 68.326°E

Information
- Motto: A Petaro Cadet Does Not Cheat, Lie Or Steal
- Opened: August 1957 at Mirpurkhas; August 1959 at Petaro
- Principal: Cdre Faisal Iqbal Qazi (SI)M
- Adjutant: Lieutenant Commander Rana Muhammad Hadi Saleem , Pakistan Navy
- Area: over 700 acres
- Houses: 8
- Colours: Red, navy blue and sky blue
- Alumni: The Petarian Association (TPA)
- Demonym: Petarians
- Website: www.ccpetaro.edu.pk, www.petaro.org

Cadet College Petaro is a military boarding school in Jamshoro District of the southern province of Sindh in Pakistan, about 30 km from Hyderabad. The college is under the administration of the Pakistan Navy.

Its campus occupies over 700 acres (2.8 km^{2}) on the west bank of the Indus River on the road from Hyderabad to Dadu, Larkana and Quetta.

== History ==
The college was founded in August 1957 at Mirpurkhas, Sindh as a boarding institution. The first batch of teachers joined the college on 5 August 1957 at Mirpurkhas while the college building was still under preparation. These five teachers were Abdullah Khadim Hussain, Feroz Yusuf Khan, Aziz Ahmed Farooqui, Hasan Masud Zuberi, and Syed Zahoorul Hasan. While the government had advertised for the position of principal of the college, Mohammed Hasnain was appointed as the in-charge in absence of the principal on 25 August 1957 for the initial few months. Col.(retd) J.H.H. Coombes was appointed as the first principal on 20 March 1958. The first batch of 30 students joined the college on 27 August 1957 in class VIII.

In 1958, a new site was sought in order to build a permanent campus for the college. A site was chosen at Petaro, a few kilometres up the river from Jamshoro. The construction of a purpose built campus began almost immediately. Mr. Habib-ur-Rehman, Minister of Education, laid the foundation stone of the college on 16 January 1959. The initial cost of construction of the buildings of the college sanctioned by the government of then-West Pakistan was Rs. 2,700,000. The college finally moved to its new premises at Petaro in August 1959. At the time of the move, the River Indus was in flood, and Petaro was also submerged under its waters. The building in Mirpurkhas that originally housed Cadet College Petaro was given over to the Government College Mirpurkhas.

The first principal of the college was Col.(retd) J.H.H. Coombes who retired from the college in 1965. He was followed by Cdr.(retd) Firoz Shah, who remained in charge until 1972. The previous principal was Cdre. M. Abid Saleem (2000–2007). The present principal is Cdre. Mehboob Ellahi Malik (2014-onwards).

The college is a residential institution for over 900 full-time students at present, providing education from Class 8 to Class 12 (Intermediate). At the time it was first constructed, it was designed to accommodate only 360 students in four houses (or hostels). The capacity was expanded to 570 with the construction of two more houses in the late 1960s.

The year 2007 marked the fiftieth anniversary of the college. Gen. Pervez Musharraf, President of Pakistan was the chief guest at the Golden Jubilee celebrations on 28 February 2007. On this occasion, President Musharraf announced the formation of a university in the vicinity of the college that will be sponsored by the Metupak Foundation.

=== Chairman of the Board of Governors ===
List of all the past Chairmen.

No	Name	Period
1	Vice Admiral Afzal Rahman Khan H.Pk., H.Q.A., H.J.	1960 – 1966
2	Vice Admiral S. M. Ahsan H.Q.A., S.Pk. DSC	1966 – 1968
3	Vice Admiral Muzaffar Hassan H.Q.A, S.Pk	1969 – 1971
4	Vice Admiral Hasan Hafeez Ahmed T.Q.A	1972 – 1975
5	Admiral Mohammad Shariff H.J., N.I., S.J.	1975 – 1976
6	Rear Admiral R. M. Shaikh S.BT	1976 – 1977
7	Rear Admiral M. I. Arshad	1977 – 1978
8	Rear Admiral I. F. Qadir TI(M)	1978 – 1979
9	Rear Admiral K. M. Alam SI(M)	1979 – 1981
10	Rear Admiral T. K. Khan HI(M), TI(M)	1981 – 1983
11	Vice Admiral Iftikhar Ahmed Sirohey HI(M) S.BT	1983 – 1984
12	Rear Admiral Akbar H. Khan HI(M), S.BT	1984 – 1985
13	Rear Admiral M. S. Chaudhry S.BT	1985 – 1987
14	Rear Admiral S. Iqtidar Hussain S.BT	1987 – 1988
15	Rear Admiral Khalid M Mir HI(M), S.BT	1988 – 1989
16	Rear Admiral S. Wasi Haider HI(M)	1989 – 1990
17	Vice Admiral Ahmed Tasnim HI(M), SJ(Bar), S.Bt	1990 – 1991
18	Vice Admiral Mansurul Haq HI(M), S.BT	1991 – 1992
19	Vice Admiral Khalid M. Mir HI(M). S.BT	1992 – 1996
20	Rear Admiral Jawaid Iqbal HI(M)	1996 – 1997
21	Rear Admiral Fayyaz‑ur‑Rehman SI(M)	1997 – 1998
22	Rear Admiral Mahmood Ali HI(M), S.BT	1998 – 1999
23	Rear Admiral Gul Zaman Malik SI(M), SJ	1999 – 1999
24	Rear Admiral Syed Ahmed Baqar SI(M)	1999 – 2001
25	Rear Admiral Muhammad Haroon HI(M), T.Bt	2001 – 2002
26	Vice Admiral Irfan Ahmed HI(M), SJ	2002 – 2004
27	Vice Admiral M. Asad Qureshi HI(M)	2004 – 2006
28	Vice Admiral Sikandar Viqar Naqvi HI(M)	2006 – 2007
29	Rear Admiral Bakhtiar Mohsin HI(M)	2007 – 2008
30	Vice Admiral Noman Bashir HI(M)	2008 – 2008
31	Vice Admiral Saleem Ahmad Meenai HI(M)	2008 – 2009
32	Vice Admiral Azher Shamim Anwer HI(M)	2009 – 2010
33	Rear Admiral Sayyid Khawar Ali SI(M)	2010 – 2011
34	Vice Admiral Abbas Raza HI(M)	2011 – 2012

== Academics ==
The main body of students is admitted each year to Class 8. Until the academic year 1998–99, the college used to admit a small contingent of boys from the rural districts of Sindh to Class 7, to prepare them for competitive success with the new entry into Class 8. However, it was decided by the Board of Governors of the college to discontinue Class 7 from 1999 onwards. All Class 7 Cadets stayed in Shahbaz House. Shahbaz house became a full-fledged house in 2000; having a similar strength of all classes like the other houses, and started participating in all Inter-House competitions to compete for the Championship.

College students have normally secured most of the top positions in the competitive Hyderabad Board of Intermediate and Secondary Education examinations every year. Further, the first batch of O-levels brought a fruitful result by bringing 4 A*, 33 As and 20 Bs in May/June CIE O-Level Examinations 2012 under the supervision of the O-levels co-ordinator and House Master 'Sachal House' Mr. Ahsan Ali Shah.

== Campus ==
The campus is founded near the town Petaro, which is part of the District Jamshoro. The campus is practically a small township with its own electricity, water supply, sewerage, security and other infrastructure. The campus is divided into 4 parts, which are Staff Quarters, Cadets Area, Sports Grounds and College Premises. The college also has a parade ground, which hosts the Adjutant Parade and Principal Parade.

== Administration ==
The college is governed by an autonomous board of governors, headed by the Commander Karachi (COMKAR) of the Pakistan Navy as its chairman. Since 1975, the principal of the college has been an officer of the Pakistan Navy as well. The adjutants have been either from Pakistan Army (1957-1970 and 2010 onwards) or Pakistan Navy (1970–2010).

== Staff infrastructure ==
The college is controlled and patronised by the Pakistan Navy. Since 1975, the Principal posted is at least of the rank of a serving Captain of the Navy with experience of administration. His tenure is normally for 3 years. Likewise the Pakistan Navy provides an Adjutant of the rank of Lieutenant / Lieutenant Commander and other training staff like Chief Petty Officers, Petty Officers and Sailors for military training of the cadets. The current Adjutant of the college is Lieutenant Raja Arsalan Kayani, Pakistan Navy.He is from 2014-A course & from OPS Branch.He is an ex-cadet of the same college.

The college is staffed by 41 teachers (professors, assistant professors and lecturers) who have at least a master's degree. There are other officers like the medical officer, administrative officer, bursar, librarian and office superintendent. In addition, there are around 215 board employees and over 400 college employees.

== Notable alumni ==
- Asif Ali Zardari, former President of Pakistan and Co-Chairperson Pakistan Peoples Party (PPP)
- Arbab Ghulam Rahim, former Chief Minister of Sindh
- Liaquat Ali Jatoi, former Federal Minister of Industries and former Chief Minister of Sindh
- Zulfiqar Mirza, former Sindh Home Minister, Member of Sindh Provincial Assembly
- Rizwan Ahmed, Federal Secretary to Government of Pakistan
- Maroof Afzal, Federal Secretary to Government of Pakistan
- Khan Hasham bin Saddique, Vice Chief of Naval Staff (VCNS)
- Syed Arifullah Hussaini, Commander Pakistan Fleet
- Allah Dino Khawaja, senior PSP officer
- Nouraiz Shakoor, former Federal Minister, Govt of Pakistan
- Karim Ahmed Khawaja, former senator, Govt of Pakistan
- Younus Changezi, former Balochistan Minister of Forests and Environment
- Masood Sharif Khan Khattak, former Director General of the Intelligence Bureau of Pakistan (DGIB)
- Zaka Ashraf, former President Zarai Taraqqiati Bank, and former Chairman Pakistan Cricket Board
- Shahid Iqbal, Chief of Staff (COS), Ex-DCNS (T&P), COMPAK, DCNS (O) and Commander CTF-150

== See also ==
- Cadet College Swat
- Cadet College Hasan Abdal
- Cadet College Kohat
- Cadet College Mastung
- Cadet College Razmak
- Cadet College Skardu
