= Army Education Corps =

Army Education Corps may refer to:

- Army Education Corps (India), a corps of the Indian Army
- Royal Army Educational Corps, a corps of the British Army
