= J. H. H. Coombes =

Col. John Harold Henry Coombes
- Born: 28 December 1906; United Kingdom
- Died: 18 February 1978 (aged 71); Ashford, Kent, England
- Citizenship: British
- Occupations: Educationist, army
- Known for: First principal of Cadet College Petaro
- Spouse(s): 1st wife, Alice: 2nd wife, Elsie
- Website: www.petaro.org

Colonel John Harold Henry Coombes CBE (1906–1978) was the first principal of Cadet College Petaro, one of the earliest public schools built in Pakistan in 1957. During his military career, he served in the British Army and fought the Second World War on the Malayan front.

== Education and early life ==
Coombes was born on 28 December 1906. His father was a fisherman in Guernsey, the second largest of the Channel Islands. His mother died in 1918, when he was 12 years old. As a teenager, he secured a scholarship to Elizabeth College, Guernsey as a day scholar. At college, he was captain of athletics and gained colours for football and hockey. He also played cricket and took part in shooting, besides being a school prefect and sergeant in the Officers Training Corps from 1918 to 1924.

Coombes then won a scholarship to Pembroke College, Oxford University in Mathematics (1924–28). Excelling in sports once again, he gained college colours for hockey, football, and cricket, and was the Oxfordshire hockey captain from 1926 to 1928. At the same time, he was commissioned as second lieutenant in 1st Battalion of the Royal Guernsey Light Infantry. There was conscription in Guernsey, and he did his two-month annual training during his vacations. He was a member of the British Army of the Rhine when Britain occupied Germany after World War I until 1931.

In 1928, he contracted double pneumonia and was unable to sit for the Degree Examination. Instead of returning for a fifth year at Oxford, he took a job as an inspector of cotton plantations in the Sudan, where he stayed from 1928 to 1932. There he learnt to read and write Arabic and decided to join the Sudan Civil Service. He also became a volunteer officer in the Sudan Defence Force.

In 1935, while teaching part-time, he completed a BA at University of Oxford, and became married to Alice. He completed an MA (1939) while working as senior geography master, with French as his second subject, at a public school.

== World War II ==
Coombes was called up in August 1939 and went to France with the advance party of the British Expeditionary Force as a captain in the Royal Artillery. He was later transferred to the R.A.F. He was captured at Dunkirk but later escaped to England and remained with the 4th Squadron till 1941.

In late 1941, Coombes was posted to command 330 Artillery Battery of 137 Field Regiment and sent to join the 11th Indian Division in Malaya. His regiment reached there in time to be in the first Indian battle against the Japanese at Jitra on the Siamese (Thai) border. Capt. Coombes's last battery position was on the beach at Singapore when this "Gibraltar of the East" fell to the Japanese on 15 February 1942. He remained a prisoner of war till August 1945.

== Prisoner of war ==
Coombes recorded his memoirs as a prisoner of war in his book Banpong Express, which provides a vivid narrative of the Malayan Campaign and of life as a prisoner of war under the "death shadow" of the Imperial Japanese Army. This book was written in the prisoner of war camp at Nangpladuk (Siam). It was hidden in the lining of a one-gallon thermos container which, being in use in the cook house, was never detected by the Japanese.

His regiment fought for nine weeks and suffered in a lost cause. Out of the original 700 who came to Malaya, three Officers, including the C.O., and 28 men were killed in action and 184 died a miserable death as prisoners of war. In December 1946, Coombes was Mentioned in Despatches in recognition of his conduct in this campaign. In the concluding paragraph of Banpong Express, Coombes writes "Those of us who remained have experienced the bitterness of defeat and the humiliation of captivity under conditions as macabre as any in the history of warfare. We were indeed lucky that the end came when it did. Now we can live again and hope that out of our experiences we may fashion a philosophy of life dynamic enough to be effective in a war-weary world. It must not happen again".

== Post World War II ==
Coombes returned to the UK in May 1947 and wanted to join the Royal Artillery in the Regular Army. He was turned down due to his age, so he took down his lieutenant colonel's badge of rank and instead joined the Royal Army Education Corps as a captain on a short service commission.

In 1949, he passed the selection tests and at last became a regular soldier, being immediately promoted to lieutenant colonel. In 1951 he was promoted to the rank of full colonel and appointed as chief education officer, Anti-Aircraft Command. His approach to education was based on his experience of how a real fighting servicemen lived and so he was welcomed everywhere. In 1954, he went to Singapore as chief education officer, Far East. His province extended over Borneo, Ceylon, Hong Kong, Korea, India, Nepal, and Malaya, and with SEATO from Australia and New Zealand to the Philippines.

He was producing daily English newspapers in Korean, Malay, and Gurkhali in Malaya and in Hong Kong. He had also started British, Gurkhali, and Malay children's schools. His contribution in the fields of education, language training and broadcasting was outstanding and he recalled this period as being a "Wonderfully satisfying job". In recognition of this work, he was awarded the C.B.E.

== End of army career ==
In 1956, while driving a car in Singapore, Coombes ran into a pedestrian, who was killed. Coombes was found guilty of grossly negligent driving and was sentenced by a Court of Appeal in 1957 to six months imprisonment in Changi jail, the same place where he had been held as a prisoner of war. The incident ended his army career as he immediately resigned his commission following his conviction. He was about to be further promoted, and privately he mused whether, with such high military rank, he might have been in line for the office of lieutenant-governor, the British Monarch's representative, in his home State of Guernsey. Instead, this incident cost him dearly and changed the course of his subsequent life.

== Cadet College Petaro ==
Coombes returned to the UK and saw the Pakistan Government advertisement in the Times for the position of Principal of Cadet College Mirpur Khas. He applied and told the Interview Board the truth about why he left the army. He writes, "I was accepted and came to Pakistan to show the world that Coombes was not an ordinary convict. I decided to produce a good Cadet College and set about the task with no preconceived ideas, except to produce young men who were more concerned with the Code of Honour and being sympathetic human beings than to obtain First Divisions. I was not concerned about academic results simply but about 'Real Men'. I could afford to be independent and do as I pleased since if they put me in prison, it would not be the first time."

When asked about the raw stuff from which he wanted to produce such "Real Men". He replied, "I like the young Pakistani boys. I was impressed by the charm of most boys, their affection for their families and their desire to please. I hope Pakistan will get some outstanding leaders from Petaro. I believe that the future generation of Pakistan will stand or fall by their belief in the Code of Honour".

Coombes thus became the first full-time principal of Cadet College Mirpur Khas, on 20 March 1958. The college was renamed as Cadet College Petaro in 1959 when it moved to its new campus at Petaro. Coombes is regarded as a core piece in the founding of this institution, and he remained in this position until his retirement in the summer of 1965.

During his early days at Petaro, Coombes lost his lifelong partner, Alice, who died in the UK. He remained a widower for the rest of his days at Petaro.

== Later life ==
After his retirement as principal, Coombes returned to the UK and settled at Sellindge in Kent. His love for Cadet College Petaro was such that he gave the name Petaro to his home and took every opportunity to invite Petarians – ex-cadets graduates of the college – to his UK home.

He married again in 1974, his second wife being Elsie. Coombes returned along with Elsie to Pakistan in 1971 to visit Cadet College Petaro where he was given a grand reception and spent several days. He left Pakistan for the last time with tears in his eyes.

His last post was that of deputy director of education for the Anglican Diocese of Southwark serving south London, where he worked between 1968 and 1974. Secretaries in his office there struggled to interpret his minute handwriting, which he attributed to those years when he had kept a hidden journal as a POW under the Japanese.

After suffering a stroke, he was cared for by Elsie at his home in Sellindge, Kent. He died on 18 February 1978.

Coombes is eulogised at virtually every major occasion held at Cadet College Petaro. He is considered to be a legend and a great hero for the cause of education in Pakistan.

== Publications ==
- Coombes wrote his memoirs entitled Banpong Express – Being an account of the Malayan Campaign, with some subsequent experiences as a guest of the Imperial Japanese Army. It was published in March 1948 in the UK but is now out of print.
- Colonel J.H.H. Coombes – First Principal of Cadet College Petaro, edited by Kazi Zulkader Siddiqui, Islamabad, 2007. This book was published on the occasion of the Golden Jubilee of Cadet College Petaro in February 2007. It includes the complete text of Banpong Express in addition to articles about Coombes written by his colleagues and his students.

== See also ==
- Cadet College Petaro
- Petarians

Academic offices
Preceded by Mr. Muhammad Hasnain, Acting Principal (Sept 1957 – March 1958)	Principal, Cadet College Petaro; 1958–1965	Succeeded by Cdr. Firoz Shah (1965–1972)
