= Garrison Cadet College Kohat =

Location
- Kohat, Khyber Pakhtunkhwa; Pakistan
- Coordinates: = 33°32′20″N 71°28′46″E

Information
- Type: Boarding Institution
- Motto: العلم قوة (Knowledge is Power)
- Established: 1990; 36 years ago
- School board: Federal Board of Intermediate and Secondary Education, Islamabad
- Principal: Brig Malik Nasir Ali Awan
- Grades: 8–12
- Area: 85 acres (34 ha)
- Houses: 6
- Colour
- Slogan: Once a Garrisonian, Always a Garrisonian
- Demonym: Garrisonian
- Website: gcck.edu.pk

Garrison Cadet College Kohat is a boarding school, situated in the suburb of Kohat City. The college has classes from class 8th to FSc (Pre-Engineering and Pre-Medical Level). Students are inducted in class 8 and Class 11; after a 3-step selection process, which composed of a written test, interview and medical examination. The college has over 600 enrolled cadets aged 12–19 years. Each class has approximately 125 cadets.

== History ==
Garrison Cadet College Kohat is situated in the suburb of Kohat City. The foundation stone of the college was laid on 1 March 1990 by the then Prime Minister of Pakistan Mohtarma Benazir Bhutto. The college was inaugurated on 10 May 1993 by the then Quartermaster General of Pakistan Army, Lieutenant General Muhammad Arif Bangash. It was established as Kohat Garrison College but later it was renamed Garrison Cadet College Kohat in 1999. Regular classes commenced in March 1993. The first principal was Col Muhammad Idrees Niazi (Late). The college is affiliated and patronized by the Provincial Government of KP since 2017.

== Present composition of BOG ==
Patron-in-Chief

- Chief Minister of Khyber Pakhtunkhwa Province

Chairman

- General Officer Commanding 9th Infantry Division, Kohat

Members

- Secretary E&SE KP
- Secretary Finance KP
- Secretary Establishment KP
- Secretary P&D KP
- Commissioner Kohat Division
- Commandant Signal Training Centre, Kohat
- VC KUST
- RPO Kohat Division
- Station Commander, Kohat
- Principal (Member / Secretary)

== Principals ==
Principals at Garrison Cadet College Kohat
| Colonel.(Retired) Muhammad Idrees Niazi, Armour | September 1992 - December 1995 |
| Brigadier.(Retired) Talat Imtiaz Naqvi, Artillery | December 1995 - December 2001 |
| Brigadier.(Retired) Tariq Saeed, SI(M), Artillery | March 2002 - March 2013 |
| Brigadier. Munawar Alam, SI(M), Artillery | March 2013 - October 2015 |
| Brigadier. Sameen Habib Malik, AD | October 2015 - July 2016 |
| Colonel. Zulfiqar Ahmad Abbasi | July 2016 - October 2016 |
| Brigadier. Nadeem Akhter Hussain, Punjab | October 2016 - September 2021 |
| Brigadier. Hamid Jamil Khan, Baloch | October 2021 - September 2023 |
| Brigadier. Malik Nasir Ali Awan, Punjab | September 2023 - To date |

== See also ==
- Kohat
- Cadet College Hasan Abdal
- Cadet College Kohat
- PAF Public School Sargodha
- Military College Jhelum
