= Quetta Cantonment =

- Cantonment
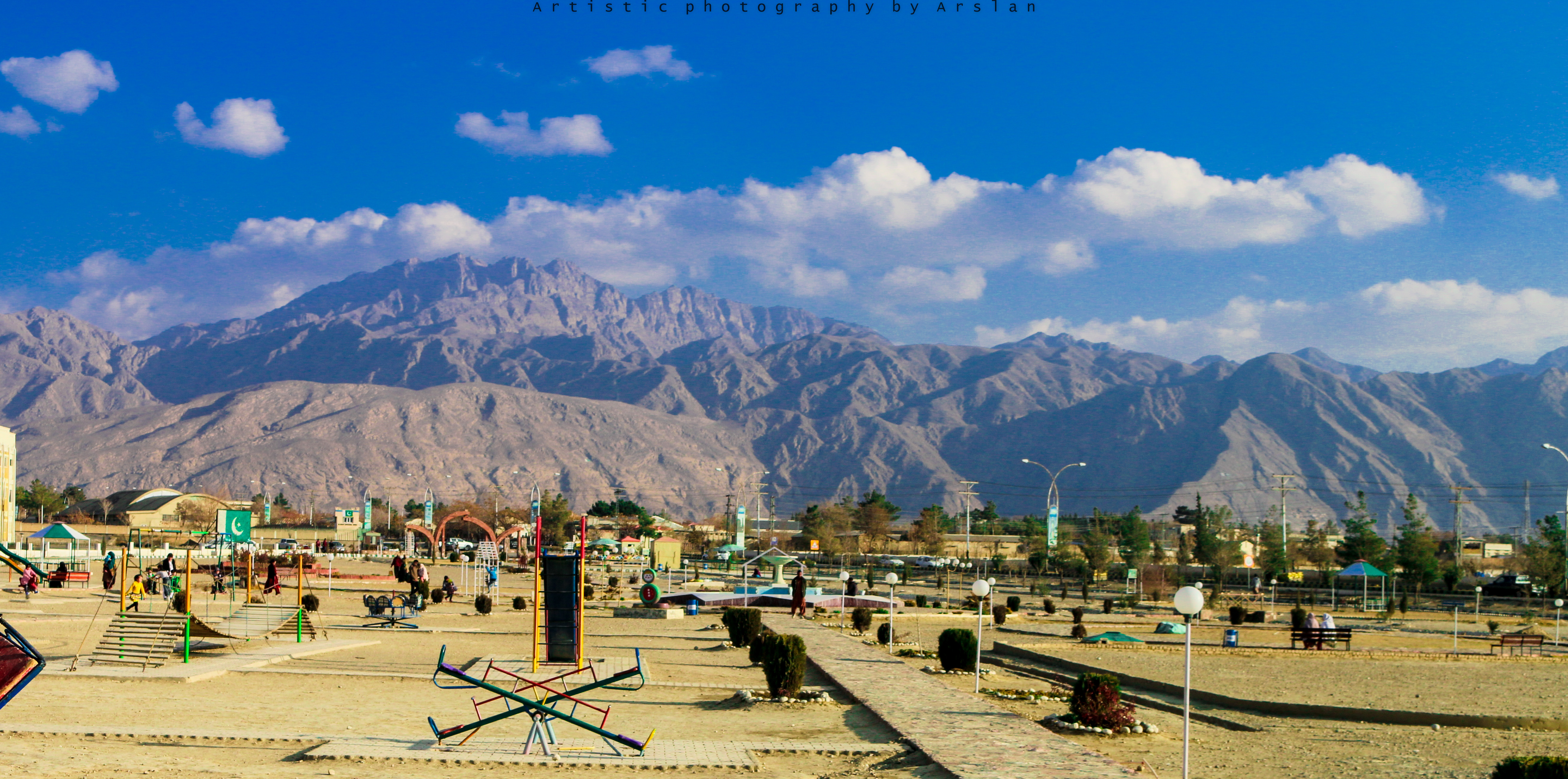

- Location within Pakistan
- Coordinates: 30°10′52″N 67°01′59″E
- Country: Pakistan
- Province: Balochistan
- District: Quetta District
- Time zone: UTC+5 (PST)

Quetta Cantonment is a military cantonment area adjacent to the city of Quetta in the Balochistan province of Pakistan.

== See also ==
- Khuzdar Cantonment
- Loralai Cantonment
- Ormara Cantonment
- Zhob Cantonment
