= Military College Jhelum =

Coordinates: 32°53′48″N 73°45′29″E

Location
- Sarai Alamgir, Punjab; Pakistan

Information
- Type: Military College
- Motto: Knowledge and Action ݝڶݥ ۇ ݝݥڶ
- Established: 3 March 1922
- Faculty: 65
- Grades: 8th – 12th(ICS/Pre-Eng/Pre-Med)
- Enrollment: ~600
- Houses: 7
- Color: Dark green
- Mascot: Alamgirians
- Website: militarycollege.edu.pk

Military College Jhelum (MCJ) is a feeder college to the Pakistan Military Academy, Kakul, Pakistan. The college is last of three military colleges in Pakistan; the others being Military College Murree and Military College Sui.

Old Campus Building

== History ==
The college's foundation stone was laid on 25 February 1922 by the Prince of Wales at Jalandhar Cantonment for the King George Royal Indian Military Schools (KGRIMS) at Jallandhar and Jhelum in Punjab. Regular classes at the college began on 15 September 1947. Jallandhar is now in the Indian state of Punjab but the school located there was relocated to the state of Himachal Pradesh after being renamed as the Chail Military School.

College Monogram

== Location ==
Military College Jhelum is located in the town of Sarai Alamgir in the district of Gujrat on the east bank of River Jhelum. Due to its proximity to city of Jhelum and because Sarai Alamgir once part of Jhelum District till 2002, it is widely known as Military College Jhelum and is considered to be in the cantonment limit of Jhelum.

It may be mentioned here that Sara-i-Alamgir Tehsil was separated from Gujrat district and included in Jhelum District in the 1990s. However, later this decision was reversed.

== List of Commandants ==
Commandants and their tenure start dates are:

King George Royal Indian Military School Period
Capt. W.L. Clark, AEC	15 September 1925
Capt. H.H. Clark, AEC	24 August 1930
Maj. W.P. Selbie, MC, AEC	9 April 1933
Lt. Col. T.H.L. Stebbing, AEC	14 May 1937
King George Royal Indian Military College Period
Lt.Col. T.H.L. Stebbing, AEC	1943
QUAID E AZAM	22 August 1947
Lt.Col. S.F.H. Zaidi, A.S.C.	24 February 1948
Lt.Col. Muhammad Rafiq, Punjab	1 July 1952
Lt.Col. Sultan Sikandar, Punjab	28 April 1953
Lt.Col. H.L. Edwards, AEC	9 July 1954
Lt.Col. Muhammad Rafiq, Punjab	18 October 1955
Military College Jhelum Period
Lt.Col. Muhammad Rafiq, Punjab	23 March 1956
Lt.Col. Muhammad Sardar Khan, AEC	3 May 1959
Lt.Col. Murtaza Hussain Khan, AEC	15 May 1967
Lt.Col. Pervaiz Sikandar,	22 June 1969
Lt.Col. S.A. Qureshi, AEC	31 December 1969
Col. N.D. Ahmed,	28 October 1970
Col. Muhammad Zahur-ul-Haq,	29 April 1974
Col. Muhammad Ikram Ameen,	15 June 1977
Col. Muhammad Said Khokahar,	23 August 1978
Col. Abdul Sattar, AEC	5 June 1980
Brig. Abdul Sattar, AEC	1 January 1981
Brig. Inayat-ur-Rehman Siddiqui, AEC	1 January 1983
Brig. Usman Shah, SI(M), Artillery	13 August 1984
Brig. Dr Noor-ul-Haq, A.E.C	7 August 1987
Brig. Maqsud-ul-Hassan, SI(M), TI(M), Punjab	12 October 1991
Brig.(Retd) Muhammad Afzal Malik SI(M), TI(M), Artillery	August 1998 – May 2013
Brig. Akhter Pervaiz SI(M), Artillery	May 2013 – August 2015
Brig. Ahmed Salman, Baloch	October 2015 –October 2018
Brig. Zahid Naseem Akbar, Punjab	8 October 2018 – 30 August 2019
Brig. Muhammad Saeed Anwar, SI(M), Artillery (44 SP)	5 September 2019 - 31 August 2022
Brig. Muhammad Ahmed Qureshi, Artillery	1 September 2022 - 14 October 2024

== Notable alumni ==
The college has produced five four-star generals of Pakistan Army, Air Force and Navy, namely former Chairman Joint Chiefs of Staff General Muhammad Iqbal Khan (Late), former Chief of Air Staff Air Chief Marshal Zulfiqar Ali Khan (late), former Chief of Naval Staff Admiral Abdul Aziz Mirza, former Vice Chief of Army Staff General Yusaf Khan, and former Chief of Army Staff General Ashfaq Parvez Kayani.

College has 40 Swords of Honour, and many gallantry medals including one Nishan-e-Haider Major Muhammad Akram.

The senior notable military officers of the College Alumni include;

- quaid e azam
- Lt General (R) Nazar Hussain, HI (M), Commander Army Air Defence Command
- Maj Muhammad Akram,
- Maj Gen (R) Ghazanfar Ali Khan, GOC 41st Infantry Division, Quetta and Vice Chief of General Staff, GHQ
- Lt Gen (R) Raza Muhammad Khan, Commander XXXI Corps, Bahawalpur
- Maj Gen Tariq Mehmood, Deputy DG ISI, Islamabad
- Maj Gen Zahir Shah, Director General Survey of Pakistan
- Lt Gen Javed Iqbal, AG GHQ
- Masood Ashraf Raja, English Professor, University of North Texas
- Maj Gen Obaidullah Khan
- Gen (R) Ashfaq Parvez Kayani, Ex-Chief Of Army Staff Pakistan
- Maj Gen Kamal Anwar Chaudry, ex IG FC South Balochistan
- Maj Abdul Wahab, SJ TBt
- Lt Gen Fayyaz Hussain Shah HI(M), Commander IV Corps(Lahore)
- Lt Gen Zafar Iqbal ex Comd AADC
- Lt Gen Omer Ahmed Bokhari, CGS
- Lt Gen Rahat Naseem Khan, ex President NDU
- Lt Gen Inayat Hussain, CLS
- Lt Gen Hassan Khattak, QMG

== Mentors ==
Mentors are the instructors which served their time in Military College Jhelum. Some are listed below

- Prof.Saeed Rashid

== See also ==
- Army Burn Hall College
- List of cadet colleges in Pakistan
- Military College Sui
- Cadet College Swat
