= Tahseen Ullah Khan =

Pakistan Navy naval officer

- Military career
- Allegiance: Pakistan
- Branch: Pakistan Navy
- Service years: 1977–2014
- Rank: Rear Admiral
- Unit: Submarine Service Branch
- Commands: Chief Staff Officer to Commander Pakistan Fleet; Director of Maritime Affairs; Director of Submarine Operations; Deputy DG of Maritime Security Agency; D.G of Pakistan Coast Guard
- Conflicts: War on terrorism Combined Task Force 150
- Awards: Sitara-i-Imtiaz (military)

Tahseen Ullah Khan was a Pakistan Navy officer and served as director-general of the Pakistan Maritime Security Agency. A Navy engineer officer, Khan has previously served as a Defence Attaché at the Pakistan High Commission in Malaysia and as a military advisor to the Malaysian Navy.

== Education ==
Khan attended the military high school Cadet College Kohat where he graduated with a pre-engineering advanced diploma. He is a graduate of Pakistan Navy Staff Course and Armed Forces War Course and holds degrees of B.Sc. (Hons) in Chemical engineering from Karachi University and Master's degree in War Studies from Quaid-e-Azam University, Islamabad. He also holds a diploma in French language from National University of Modern Languages, Islamabad.

== Pakistan Navy career ==
Khan was commissioned in the Pakistan Navy on 1 December 1977. Upon attaining his commission, he was selected to undergo his training at Britannia Royal Naval College, Dartmouth, Devon, United Kingdom. On his return from UK, he joined the Submarine Service of the Pakistan Navy where-in he served onboard submarines in various capacities. He specialized in the Arms of Submarines from CIN, St. Mandrier, France in 1986. He also served as ADC to Chairman Joint Chiefs of Staff Committee from 1989–91. He commanded two submarines; PNS Ghazi (S134) and PNS Mangro (S133) from 1994–96.

== Defence attaché and military advisor ==
He served as Defence and Naval Advisor in Pakistan High Commission Kuala Lumpur (Malaysia) from 1996–1999. On return, he was appointed at Naval Headquarters as Director Maritime Affairs and later as Director Submarine Operations. He has also served as Deputy Director General Maritime Security Agency. Upon his promotion to the rank of Commodore, he was appointed to the faculty of National Defence University, Islamabad in 2004 for two years from where he was appointed Commander North before being appointed as Commandant, PN War College, Lahore.

Before his appointment as Director General Maritime Security Agency, he was serving as Chief Staff Officer to Commander Pakistan Fleet. His interests include reading and relaxing by listening to music and golfing in leisure time. He is married and has a daughter and a son.
