= Sargodha Cantonment =

Military cantonment in Punjab, Pakistan

Sargodha Cantonment سرگودھا کنٹونمنٹ
- Cantonment
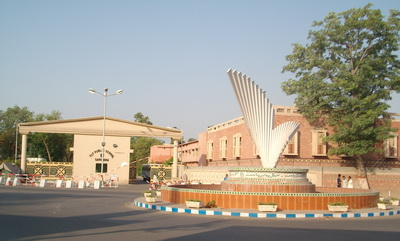
- Queen Chowk (Intersection) in Sargodha Cantonment

- Location in Pakistan
- Coordinates: 32°11′18″N 73°01′43″E
- Country: Pakistan
- Province: (Punjab, Pakistan) Punjab
- District: Sargodha

Government
  - Body: Cantonment Board

Area
  - Total: 79 km^{2} (31 sq mi)

Population (2017 Census of Pakistan)
  - Total: 659,862
- Postal code: 40100
- Dialling code: 048
- Website: cbsargodha.gov.pk

Sargodha Cantonment (Urdu: سرگودھا کنٹونمنٹ) is a cantonment adjacent to the Sargodha Airbase in Sargodha, Punjab, Pakistan.

Pakistan's largest airbase, PAF Base Mushaf (formerly PAF Base Sargodha), is situated here and hosts the headquarters of the Pakistan Air Force's Central Air Command.

The airbase is also home to the Combat Commanders School (CCS), formerly the Fighter Leaders' School.

== See also ==
- PAF Base Mushaf
- Cantonment (Pakistan)
