= Military College Murree =

Feeder college to Pakistan military academy

Coordinates: 33°54′33″N 73°26′0″E

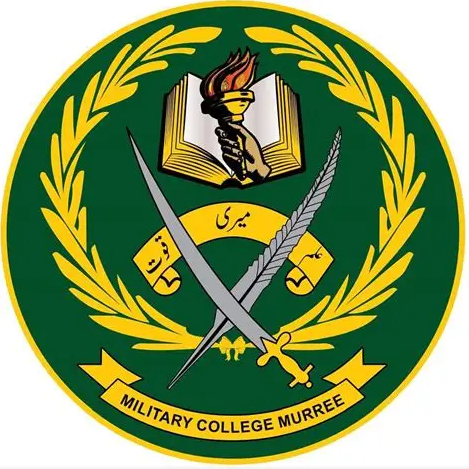
- Upper Topa, Murree Tehsil, Punjab; Pakistan

Information
- Type: Feeder College to Pakistan Military Academy
- Motto: علم ميري قوت (Knowledge is my Strength) new motto character, courage and commitment
- Established: 1 September 2008 (Year of Soldiers)
- Current Commandant: Brig Afzaal
- Faculty: 68
- Grades: 8th – 12th
- Enrollment: 550
- Houses: 6
- Color: Dark Green
- Mascot: Himalians
- Website: /www.mcm.edu.pk

Military College Murree or MCM, is a military high school, located at Upper Topa, Murree Tehsil, District Murree, Pakistan. It was inaugurated by COAS Gen.Ashfaq Pervaiz Kiyani NI(M), HI on 1 September 2008.

Military College Murree is one of the three military colleges in Pakistan. The institution is a feeder college to the Pakistan Military Academy, Kakul.

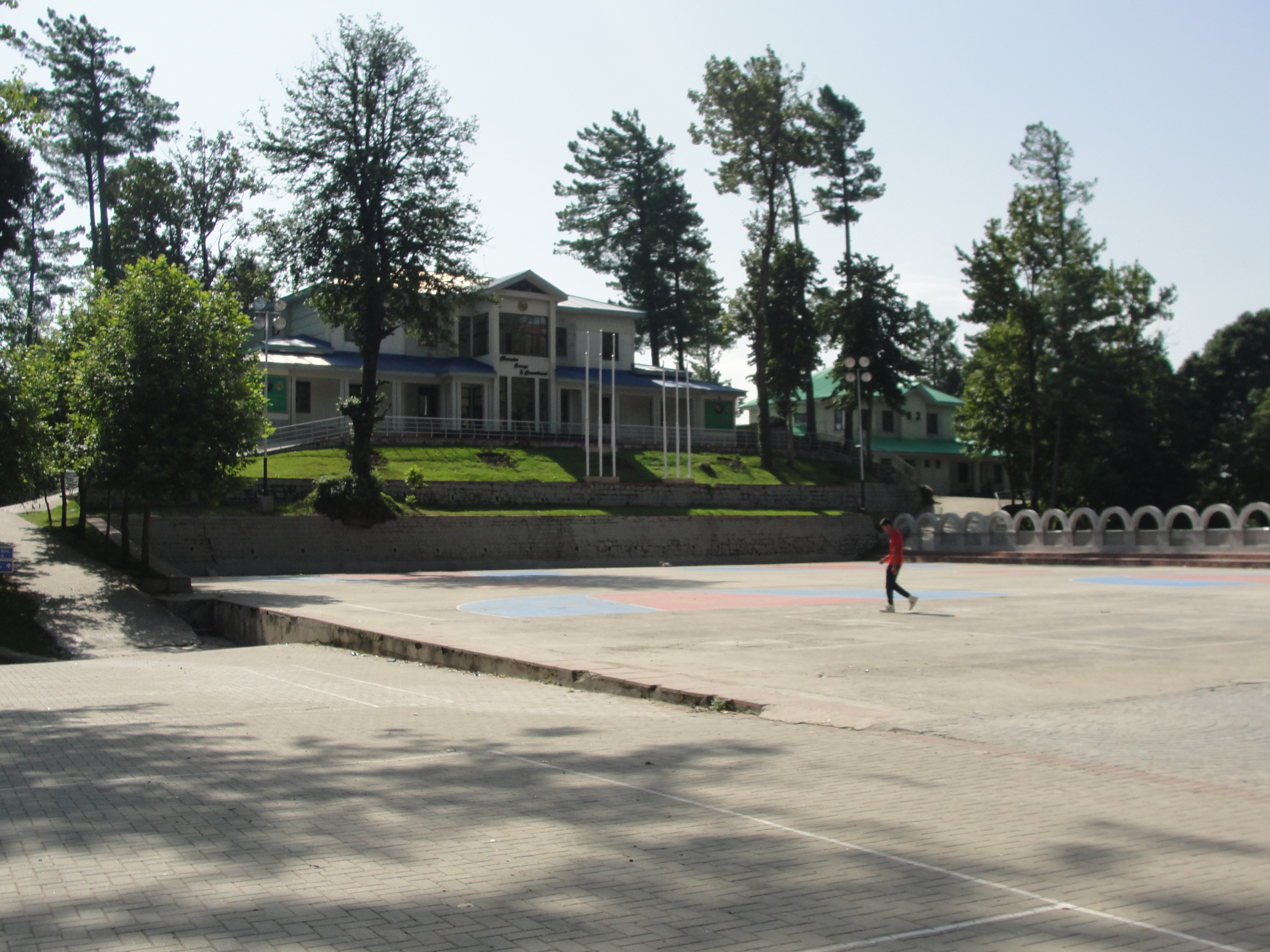
Main building of the college

== History ==
The college's foundation stone was laid on 1 September 2008 by the General Ashfaq Parvez Kayani.

== Cadet life ==
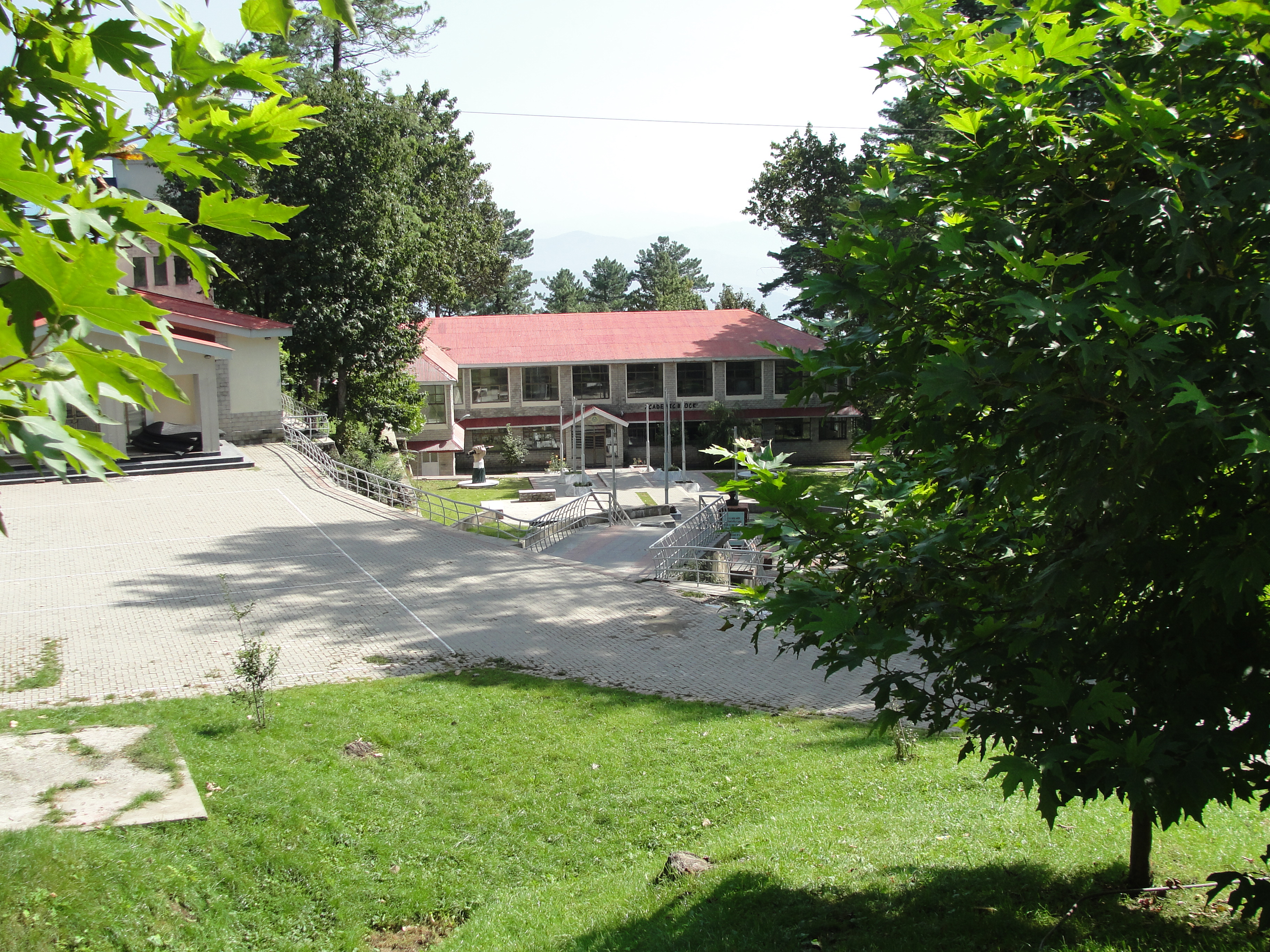
MCM hostel building

The students are called cadets. Cadets take part in sports such as field hockey, football, basketball, volleyball, squash, tennis and horse riding. Fitness activities include judo, karate, gymnastics, jogging and running. Physical training (PT) is conducted in the morning and sports in the evening. Students are taught drill and shooting.

== Names of the Entries ==
- 1st entry Iron Legion (28 Aug. 2008–28 Aug. 2010)
- 2nd entry Storm Hawks (12 Aug. 2009–25 June 2011)
- 3rd entry Shadow Blades (17 July 2010 – 28 June 2012)
- 4th entry Thunder Wolves (15 Sep. 2011-4 July 2013)
- 5th entry Paladins (12 June 2010 – 14 June 2014)
- 6th entry Iron Wolves (5 May 2011 – 9 June 2015)
- 7th entry Steel Falcons (5 May 2012 – 4 June 2016)
- 8th entry Adamantines (28 April 2012 – June 2017)
- 9th entry Yalghari (27 April 2013 – June 2018)
- 10th entry The Pirates (24 May 2014 – 14 June 2019)
- 11th entry Janbaz (23 May 2015 – June 2020)
- 12th entry The Trend Changers (28 May 2016 – June 2021)
- 13th entry Iron Sentinels (28 May 2017 – June 2022)
- 14th entry THE GOD DRUNKS (23 June 2018 – 9 July 2023)
- 15th entry Mony Marvels (25 April 2019 – June 2024)
- 16th entry The End of An Era (18 April 2020 – 5 June 2025)
- 17th entry The Pioneers(17 April 2021 – June 2026)
- 18th entry Shadow Hawks (10 May 2022 – June 2027)
- 19th entry The Rebellious (6 May 2023 – June 2028)
- 20th entry Steel Titans (17 April 2024 – June 2029)
- 21st entry Phantom Brigade (20 April 2025 – June 2030)

== Commandants ==
1. Col M. Riaz Shaheen, AEC

2. Brig. Shiraz Ullah Ch, BR

3. Brig Abdul Hayee, Engrs

4. Brig Muhammad Kamran Aslam, AC

5. Brig Nusar Umer Hayat Layleka, AD

6. Brig Arshad Mahmood, AK

7. Brig Naseem Abbas, Artillery

8. Brig Adnan Bashir Dhariwal, PR

9. Brig Afzaal Ahmed, AD

== Houses ==
Military College Murree is a residential institution. Cadets are accommodated in the Hostels called "Houses". A House organizes its own social functions, excursions, prep, indoor and outdoor games and sports. Each house is in the charge of a House Master, Assistant House Master, Officer and one Non Commissioned Officer from Pakistan Army. The college is divided into six houses.

Colours	Houses	Named after
Yellow	Mehfooz House	Muhammad Mahfuz
Light Blue	Tufail House	Tufail Mohammad
Orange	Sarwar House	Raja Muhammad Sarwar
Black	Lalak House	Lalak Jan
Red	Sher Khan House	Karnal Sher Khan
Navy Blue	Aziz Bhatti House	Raja Aziz Bhatti

== Facilities and miscellaneous ==
Library: The Academic Block maintains a central library.

Computer Labs: The college has computer laboratory.

Labs: The college also has labs for Physics, Chemistry and Biology.

Medical: The college has a hospital headed by an AMC Officer Doctor, with staff. For specialized treatment, the boys are sent to Combined Military Hospital (CMH) Murree or CMH Rawalpindi.

Students are medically examined and an individual health record is maintained. The college also has an isolation ward for the segregation of patients with infectious diseases.

Clubs: Some of the major clubs include Arts Club, Science Club, Karate, Gymnastic, Debate & Other Clubs.

Recreational Activities: Picnics are arranged and the boys are taken to recreational spots around Murree, Azad Khasmir & Taxila. Educational visits are part of the training schedule at the college.

College magazine: The College Magazine is published annually in two sections (English/Urdu) and contains articles and essays written by the students. Every student is given a copy.

== Activities ==
- Cricket
- Squash
- Cross Country
- Football
- Basketball
- Field Hockey
- Physical Training
- Indoor games
- Athletics
- Shooting
- Computer Research
- Self-Defence Training
- Horse Riding
- Polo
- Volleyball
- Martial Arts
- Cyber Research
- Language Laboratory
- Virtual Classrooms

== See also ==
- Military College Jhelum
- Military College Sui
- Army Burn Hall College
- PAF Public School Sargodha
