= Hyderabad Garrison =

Hyderabad Garrison (Urdu: حيدرآباد چھاؤنی) is a cantonment adjacent to Hyderabad in the Sindh province of Pakistan. On July 1, 1980, the autonomous training Battalion of the Baloch Regiment in Sukkur was renamed and commenced operations as the Sind Regiment Center, initiating with the establishment of five training companies. The Sind Regimental Center relocated from Sukkur to Petaro, which is roughly 35 kilometers from the Hyderabad Cantonment. It transferred to its current site in October 1981, evolving into one of the most advanced facilities in the Army

Amidst the military installations and the Air Force recruitment center in the Hyderabad cantonment area stands a graceful building that is over a century old.
