= Obaidullah Khan Khattak =

- Born: Urban Lachi, District Kohat
- Alma mater: Pakistan Military Academy; Command and Staff College; National Defence University; Military College Jhelum
- Military career
- Allegiance: Pakistan
- Branch: Pakistan Army
- Rank: Lieutenant General
- Unit: 18 Field
- Commands: IG Arms-GHQ Rawalpindi, Commander Army Strategic Force, GOC Kharian, IGFC Balochistan

Obaidullah Khan Khattak is a lieutenant general in the Pakistan Army who was promoted to that rank on 20 December 2013 when he was assigned to Frontier Corps, Balochistan as inspector general of the Pakistan's paramilitary Frontier Corps force.

He replaced Lt Gen Syed Tariq Nadeem Gilani. He was appointed to the ASFC due to his extensive experiences in the restive province of Balochistan. He dealt with the hostile elements and militancy in the province via strategic implications which could detach the province from Pakistan. There is no official confirmation of the dismissal of the army officers or any denial in this regard by the Inter-Services Public Relations (ISPR).

According to sources, he was dismissed by the COAS of Pakistan General Raheel Sharif along with military officers. There is no official confirmation of his dismissal or any denial in this regard by the Inter-Services Public Relations (ISPR).
