= Saeed Rashid =

Pakistani writer & teacher (1927–1999)

Saeed Rashid

Saeed Rashid, PP, (20 January 1927 – 19 June 1999) was a writer, teacher, and historian from Pakistan.

== Life ==
=== Military College Jhelum years ===
In the 1950s he was associated with the Fine Arts Cultural Center. There he wrote and produced plays. From 1950, for several years he was associated with the editorship of the college magazine Tarbiyat (training). From 1965 to 1968 he was the library officer. From 1967 to 1985 he served as the House Master for Shershah House. In October 1974, he was appointed Director of the Research and Development Cell and in 1991 he became secretary of the Alamgirians Society.

== Major works ==
Books in Urdu

- Hayat-e-Quaid-e-Azam
- Guftar-o-Kiradar-e-Quaid-e-Azam
- Guftar-o-Kirdar-e-Sir Syed
- Tazkara-e-Iqbal
- Mukalmat-e-Iqbal
- Shad-Bad-Manzil-e-Murad
- Kirdar-ki-Kirnain
- Kirdar Saz, biography of Brig. Muhammad Rafiq
- Tazkara-e-Shuhada
- Juratoan Kay Nishan
- Haq Nawaz Kiyani Shaheed Sitara-e-Jurat
- Akram Shaheed Nishan-e-Haider
- Dastan-e-Ilm-o-Amal Volume I
- Dastan-e-Ilm-o-Amal Volume II
- Chiragon ki Qataar
- Shaheed-e-Siachin

Books in English

- Character and Conduct of Quaid-e-Azam
- Living with Leadership
- Learning to Lead
- In Search of Maturity
- From School to College
- From School to College
- A lasting light House
- Teacher Guide
- In Search of Character
- Character Building Exercise
- Teacher Education Programme
- Character Building and Public Speaking
- Pakistan and Character Building

== Recognition ==
- Saeed Rashid Block: A new academic block was named after him at Military College Jhelum on 19 November 2000.

== See also ==
- Muhammad Rafiq (brigadier)
