= Abdul Wahab (military officer) =

Pakistani military person

Major Abdul Wahab SJ TBt
- Died: 29 June 1999; Kargil, India
- Education: Military College Jhelum; Pakistan Military Academy
- Military career
- Allegiance: Pakistan
- Branch: Pakistan Army
- Service years: 1984–1999
- Rank: Major
- Service number: PA - 23120
- Units: 32 Baloch Regiment; 6 Northern Light Infantry
- Conflicts: Kargil War †
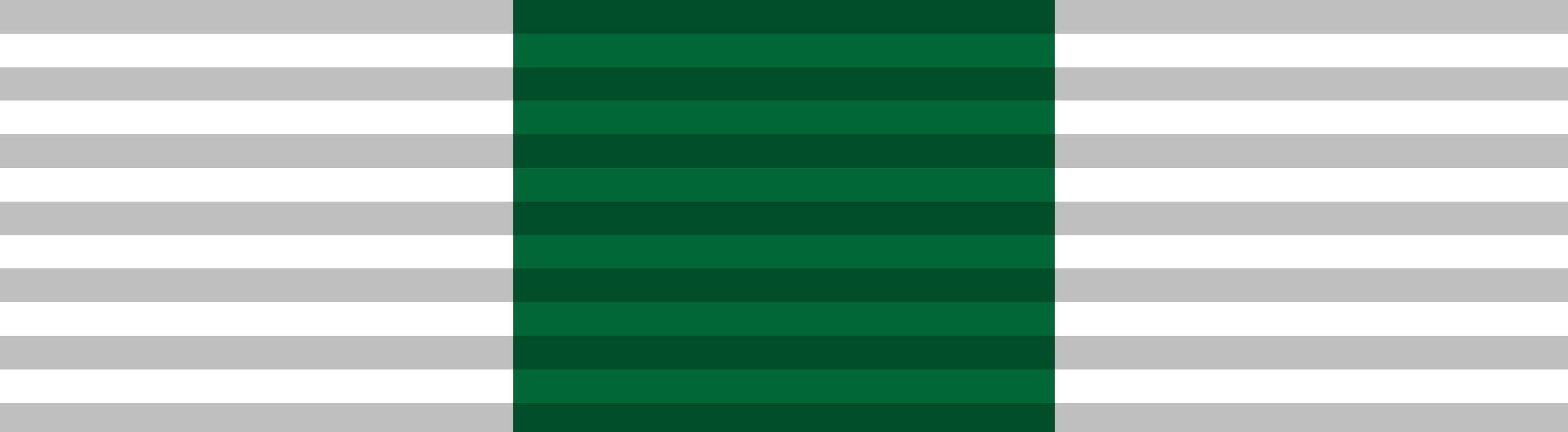
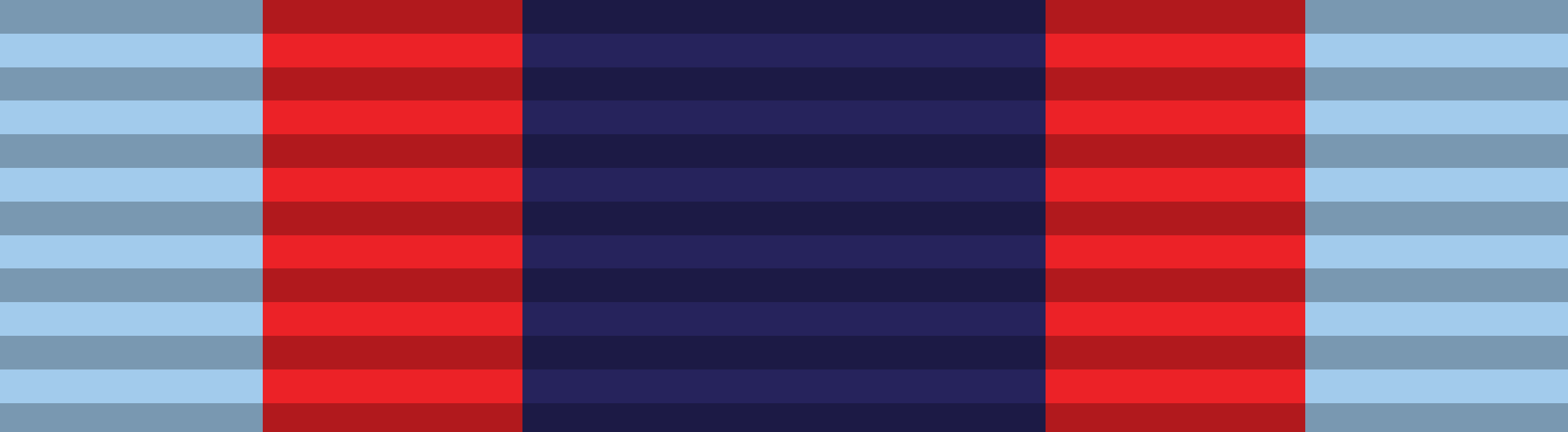
- Awards: Sitara-e-Jurat Tamgha-e-Basalat

Major Abdul Wahab SJ TBt was an officer of the Pakistan Army who was killed in the Kargil War. For his bravery in the war, he was awarded the Sitara-e-Jurat, Pakistan's third highest gallantry award.

== Early life and education ==
Wahab was born in Astore, Gilgit-Baltistan. Wahab completed his education from Military College Jhelum. Wahab was commissioned in 70 PMA Long Course of Pakistan Army. As cadet in Pakistan Military Academy, Wahab had a record in 400 meter race.

== Personal life ==
Wahab was married to Mehmooda. They have three sons, all of them serving in the army. Following Wahab's footsteps, his elder son Major Salahuddin Wahab was decorated with Tamgha-i-Basalat for his services in Operation Zarb-e-Azb.

== Military career ==
Wahab was commissioned in 70 Long Course of Pakistan Army in 32 Baloch Regiment. Wahab was awarded Tamgha-i-Basalat for capturing most wanted militants from Karachi in a military operation. In 1999, he volunteered for posting to war-zone and was posted to 6 NLI in Buniyal Sub-Sector.

== Kargil War ==
Major Wahab was posted at Buniyal sub-sector. During the Kargil War, the Indian forces attacked his post with a battalion sized force along with BOFOR artillery gun and air support. He was heavily outnumbered but yet continued fighting. He was told to readjust by his CO, but he refused to retreat from the post.

He told his two soldiers to move back to the base, and continued fighting alone. He died on 29 June 1999. He was posthumously awarded Sitara-e-Jurat. His dead body is still where he made his last stand in Kargil.

== Awards and decorations ==
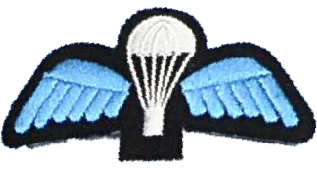

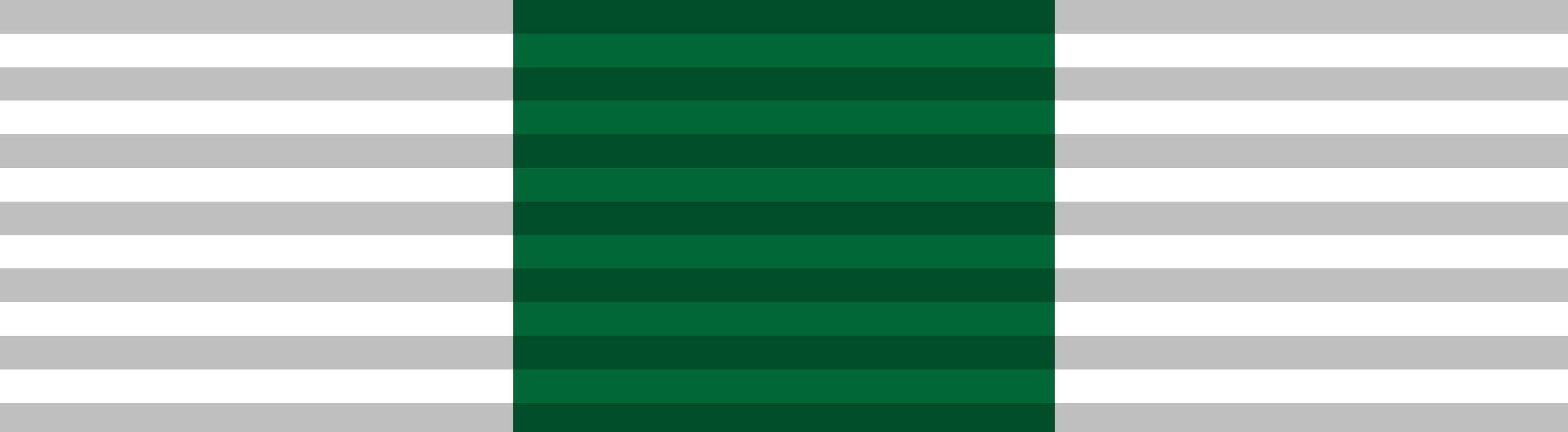
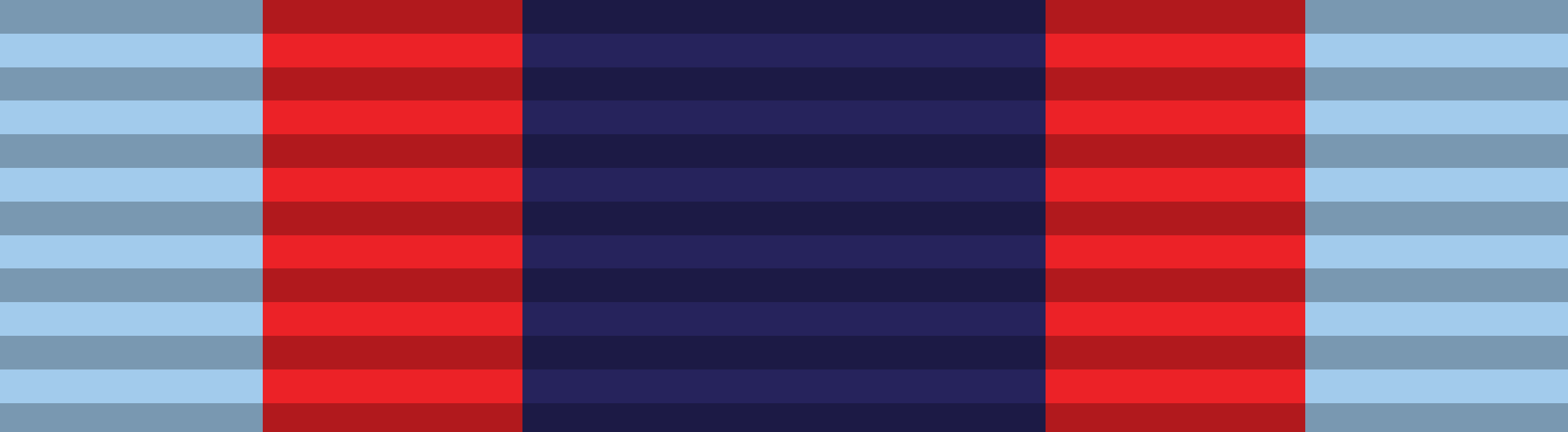

Parachutist Badge
Sitara-e-Jurat (Star of Courage) 1999 War Posthumously		Tamgha-e-Basalat (Medal of Valour)	Tamgha-e-Diffa (Defence Medal)
10 Years Service Medal	Tamgha-e-Jamhuriat (Democracy Medal) 1988	Qarardad-e-Pakistan Tamgha (Resolution Day Golden Jubilee Medal) 1990	Tamgha-e-Salgirah Pakistan (Independence Day Golden Jubilee Medal) 1997
