= Muhammad Ibrahim Khan (judge, born 1962) =

Justice of the Peshawar High Court from Swabi

Chief Justice of the Peshawar High Court
- In office 6 July 2023 – 14 April 2024
- Appointed by: Arif Alvi
- Preceded by: Musarrat Hilali

Justice of the Peshawar High Court
- In office 11 August 2016 – 14 April 2024

Personal details
- Born: 15 April 1962 (age 64) Swabi, Swabi District, Khyber Pakhtunkhwa, Pakistan

Muhammad Ibrahim Khan (born 15 April 1962) is a Pakistani jurist who served as the Chief Justice of the Peshawar High Court from 6 July 2023 till 14 April 2024.

== Early life and education ==
Khan was born in the city of Swabi in Swabi District of the Pakistani province of Khyber Pakhtunkhwa. He studied at Cadet College Kohat from 1974 to 1979. He also studied at Khyber Law College affiliated with the University of Peshawar.

== Judicial career ==
Khan worked as an Additional District and Sessions Judge (AD&SJ) in Kohat from 1 November 1993 to 1 December 1994. He was transferred to Charsadda as an AD&SJ and remained there from 8 December 1994 to 30 April 1995. Then, he was transferred to Mansehra and served as AD&SJ from 8 May 1995 to 24 May 1995. He served as a section officer of KP's Law Department from 1 June 1995 to 30 April 1997. He again served as AD&SJ in Charsadda from 5 May 1997 to 12 December 1997 then transferred to Peshawar and served there as AD&SJ from 18 December 1997 to 15 June 1998 then again as AD&SJ in Haripur from 23 June 1998 to 30 May 2002. He was elevated to District and Sessions Judge (D&SJ) and posted in Shangla from 31 May 2002 to 18 January 2003. He served as a presiding officer of the labour court in Haripur from 27 January 2003 to 2 May 2007. He was appointed as a judge in Anti-Terrorism Court of Abbottabad from 8 May 2007 to 1 December 2008. He remained D&SJ in Dera Ismail Khan from 15 December 2008 to 12 October 2009. He was D&SJ in Hangu from 22 October 2009 to 31 March 2011. He was posted judge of Anti-Terrorism Court in Peshawar from 8 April 2011 to 24 January 2013. He worked as an administrative judge of accountability court in Peshawar from 18 March 2013 to 17 March 2016. He was D&SJ in Mardan from 18 April 2016 to 11 August 2016.

He was inducted into Peshawar High Court (PHC) as an additional judge on 11 August 2016 and confirmed as permanent judge of PHC on 1 June 2018.

On 6 July 2023, President Arif Alvi appointed Khan as the Acting Chief Justice of the PHC after the previous Chief Justice, Musarrat Hilali, was elevated to the Supreme Court. His appointment as the Chief Justice was approved on 22 August 2023.
