= Firoz Shah =

Pakistani educator (1914–2007)

- Born: Firoz Shah; 7 January 1914; Baghanwala, Pind Dadan Khan, Punjab
- Died: 6 July 2007 (aged 93); Karachi, Sindh
- Burial place: Family Graveyard, Baghanwala
- Military career
- Allegiance: Pakistan
- Branch: Education Branch, Pakistan Navy
- Service years: 1938–1972
- Rank: Commander
- Nickname: Commander shah
- Service number: Personal No. 21
- Unit: Education Branch
- Commands: Principal, Cadet College Petaro; Director Naval Education (DNED)
- Conflicts: World War II; Indo-Pakistani War of 1965
- Awards: Sitara-e-Imtiaz (Military)
- Other work: Educator

Firoz Shah (Urdu: ﻓﻴﺮﻭﺯﺷﺎﻩ) (7 January 1914 – 6 August 2007), SI (M) Cdr. (ret.) was a Royal Navy officer in India under the British Raj, serving from 1938 to 1972. He was born in village Baghanwala, Tehsil Pind Dadan Khan near Chakwal, Jhelum district, Punjab. He joined the Royal Navy in India and served under the British command until 1947. He became a de facto member of the Pakistan Navy after independence and moved to Karachi. After 18 years of service to the Naval forces, he retired in 1965 as a Commander. He later served as the Principal of Cadet College Petaro from 1965 to 1972. Shah was awarded the Sitara-e-Imtiaz award posthumously by the government of Pakistan in 2007 for his service to Cadet College Petaro. The award was accepted by his younger son one week after his death.

== Career at Cadet College ==
Upon his retirement from the Navy, the Board of Governors of the Cadet College Petaro, chose Shah to replace Col.J. H. H. Coombes as the Principal of the college on 10 June 1965. Petaro was one of the earliest colleges in Pakistan, constructed in 1957. He served at Petaro for seven years until his retirement on 14 March 1972. Along with his predecessor Col.Coombes, Shah was recognized as a pioneer in the development of the institute.

During his tenure as Principal, the college gained a nationwide reputation, reaching new heights of academic and sporting achievements and improved infrastructure. Notable among such infrastructural improvements, the provision of Sui gas to Petard was a critical event, significantly improving the lives of students and staff. The construction of the boundary wall, main gate, the tennis and squash courts and the expansions of the riding club, shooting range, and hockey field were some major changes brought under his watch. The dining hall extension, planting of trees along roads, and the addition of orchards, a farm and a guest house for visiting parents and VIPs were all undertaken during Shah's tenure. With the provision of better facilities, the number of students increased from 350 to 600 and a seventh class was introduced on an experimental basis for Sindhis. Two new houses (Iqbal and Qasim) were built. The Board of Governors permitted the introduction of pre-medical classes at the intermediate level in addition to the pre-engineering section.

The college excelled in sports during the time. The "President's Shield," donated by the late president Ayub Khan (President of Pakistan) was awarded to the college after their victory in the Inter-Cadet Colleges Sports Tournament (ICCST). Petaro won the shield and the championship for four consecutive years (1968–71), gaining the right to keep the shield permanently. Petaro under Shah, saw a surge in interest by cadets to join the armed forces. Selection into Service Academies increased dramatically as a result of specialized training provided in the institute. A flying club was started with the patronage of Pakistan Air Force.

He left Cadet College Petaro while the country was going through political turmoil. With the invasion of East Pakistan by India and the formation of independent Bangladesh, the country was undergoing tough times. A few months after the war ended, Shah was forced into retirement from the college on 14 March 1972. His services to the college have made him a revered name in the promotion of education in Pakistan.

== Later life ==
After his retirement, Shah moved to his ancestral village of Baghanwala, a part of Pind Dadan Khan, and spent two and a half decades in various development projects for the upliftment of the surrounding rural areas. He was involved in farming, social activities, local bodies, establishing a primary school for girls, and improving electric and road infrastructure in the adjacent localities. In the mid-1990s, he moved to Islamabad to live with his younger son. In 2002, he moved back to Karachi and spent his last few years there until his death on 6 August 2007. His body was transported to his home in Baghanwala where he was buried near the grave of his wife, Sughra.

== Publications ==
- "Cdr.(R) Firoz Shah – The Second Principal of Cadet College Petaro: 1965–1972", published in Petaro and Petarians Over Fifty Years by Kazi Zulkader Siddiqui, Islamabad, 2007.

== See also ==
- Cadet College Petaro
- Petarians

Academic offices
Preceded by Col. J.H.H. Coombes, (20 March 1958 – 9 June 1965)	Principal, Cadet College Petaro; 10 June 1965 – 14 Mar 1972	Succeeded by Syed Shaida Azim (15 March 1972 – 27 May 1975)
