= Muhammad Rafiq (brigadier) =

Pakistani general and educator

Muhammad Rafiq, Brig., was the Commandant of Military College Jhelum (1952–53, 1955–59). In his times the name of the institution changed from King George Royal Indian Military School to Military College Jhelum. A biography of him, Kirdar Saz, was written by Saeed Rashid

== Life ==
- Education at Victoria High School Kuala Lumpur
- Method officer Pakistan Military Academy
- Commandant Military College Jhelum
- Commanding Officer 19 Punjab Regiment and Operation in Bajaur Agency
- 1965 Pakistan-India War
- Governor's Inspection Team and Mujibur Rahman's trial
- Principal Lawrence College Ghora Gali
