= Muhammad Akram =

Pakistani Army Officer (1938–1971)

Major Muhammad Akram NH
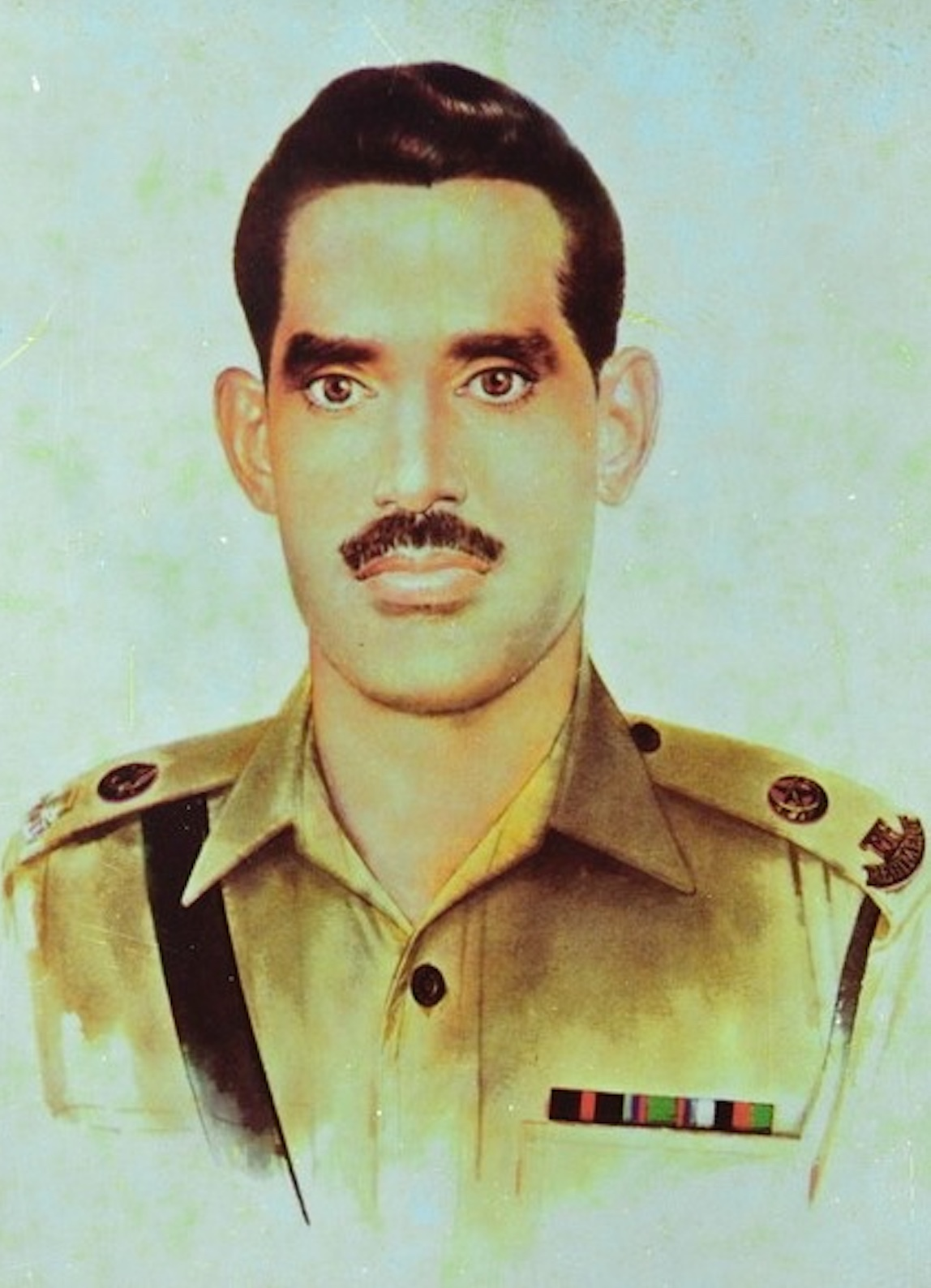
- Born: 4 April 1938; Dinga, Punjab, British India
- Died: 5 December 1971 (aged 33); Hilli, Rajshahi, East Pakistan
- Burial place: Hakimpur, Rangpur, Bangladesh
- Education: Pakistan Military Academy
- Military career
- Allegiance: Pakistan
- Branch/service: Pakistan Army
- Service years: 1956–1971
- Rank: Major
- Unit: 4th Frontier Force Regiment
- Conflicts: Indo-Pakistani War of 1965; Indo-Pakistani war of 1971; Battle of Hilli †
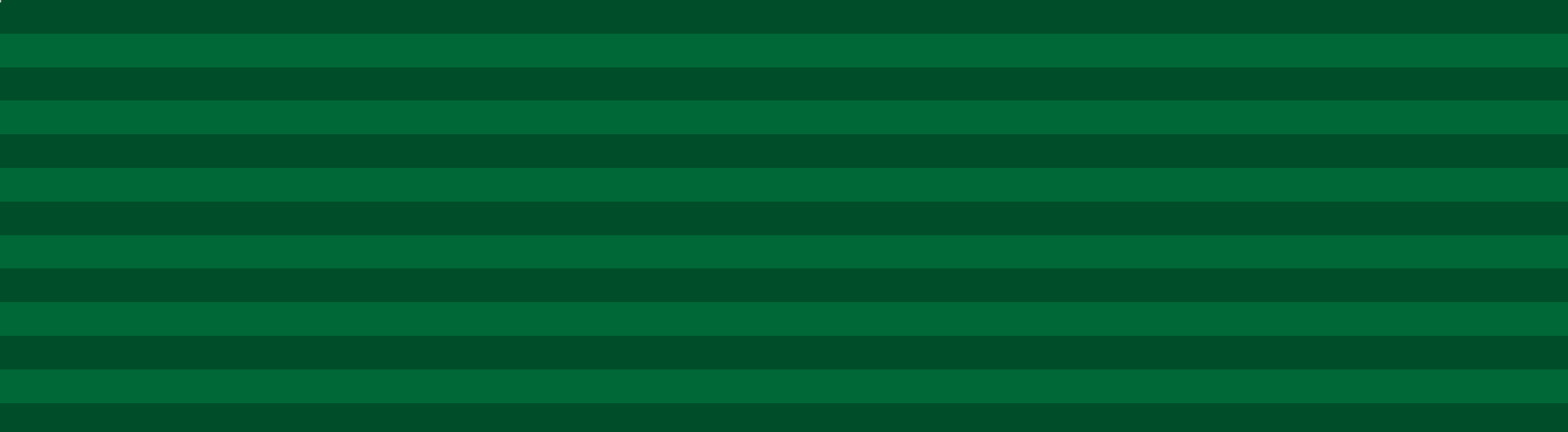
- Awards: Nishan-e-Haider

Major Muhammad Akram NH (Urdu: محمد اکرم; 4 April 1938 – 5 December 1971) was a Pakistani military officer and the sixth recipient of Pakistan's highest military award, the Nishan-e-Haider, which he was awarded posthumously for his actions of valour in the Battle of Hilli during the 1971 India-Pakistan war.

== Biography ==
Muhammad Akram was born on 4 April 1938 at Dingha, Gujrat District, into a Punjabi Awan family of Village Naka Kalan (District Jhelum). He was a military brat and his father, Malik S. Muhammad, was an enlisted personnel in the British Indian Army who later retired as a Havildar, an army n.c.o., in the Pakistan Army.

After securing his graduation from a local middle school in Nakka Kalan, Akram enrolled at the Military College Jhelum– an ROTC and an army's OCS in Jhelum, Punjab.

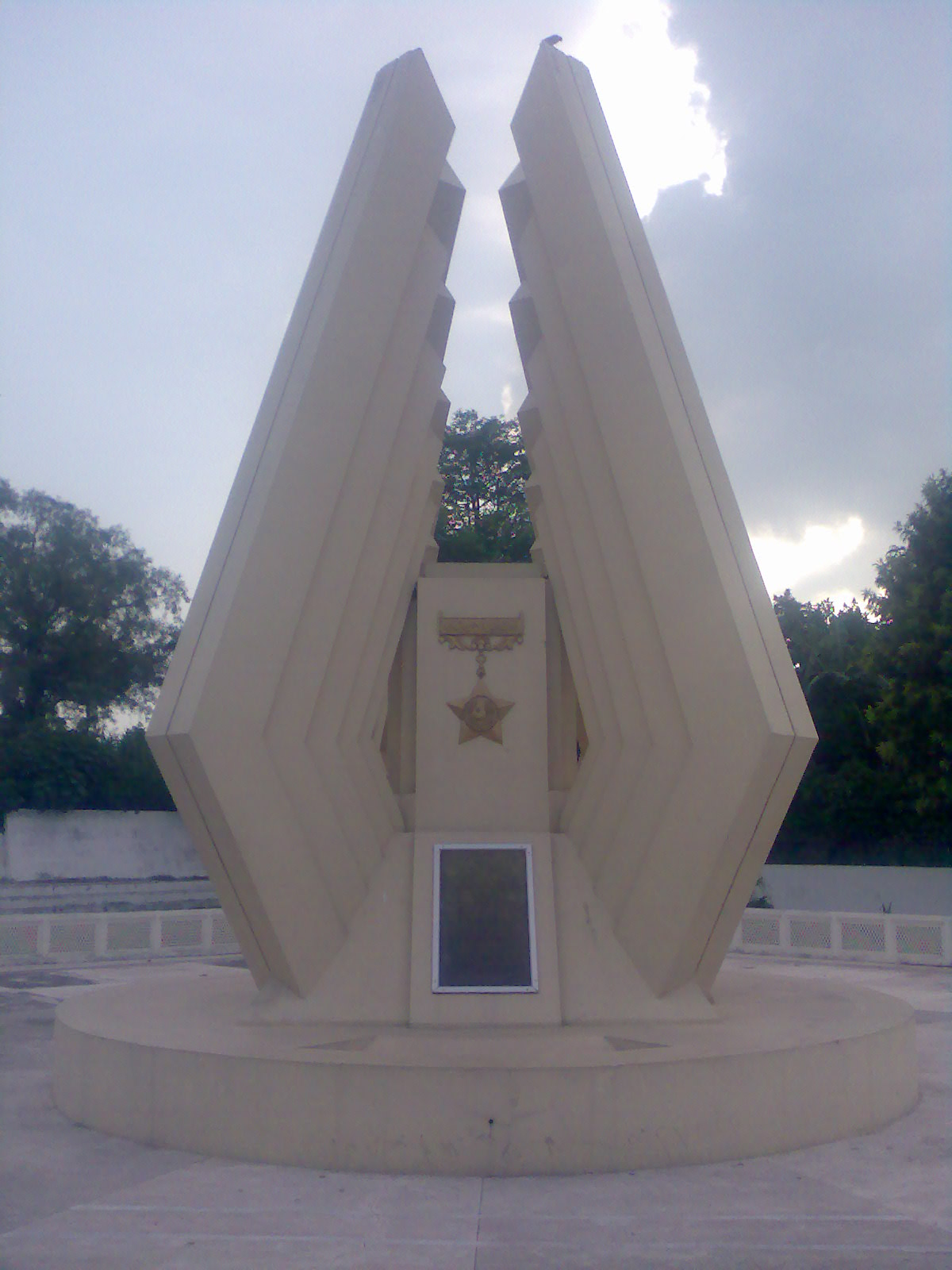
Major Akram's Memorial

In 1953, he dropped out of the Military College Jhelum due to his father's deployment and had to take the high school equivalency exam, where he took examinations in geography and intermediate education.

In 1956, he was enlisted in the Pakistan Army and posted with the 8th Punjab Regiment near the India-Pakistan border.

In 1959, Muhammad Akram was selected to attend the Pakistan Military Academy but only spent a semester after being deployed in East-Pakistan as a Naik (equivalent to Corporal).

He received a commission in the Army through his years of attendance at the army's OCS in Jhelum in 1961 in the Frontier Force Regiment, and was attached to the East Pakistan Rifles from 1963 to 1965.

He was commissioned in the Frontier Force Regiment of the Pakistan Army on 13 October 1963.

In 1965, Capt. Akram was stationed in different parts of the West-Pakistan before being deployed in East-Pakistan as a quartermaster with the Frontier Force Regiment till 1967–68.

== Nishan-e-Haider action ==
In 1968–70, Maj. Akram served with the 4th battalion posted with the Frontier Force Regiment, eventually becoming its second-in-command by 1971.

During the Indo-Pakistani war of 1971, the 4th FF Regiment, which at that time was commanded by then Lt. Col. Muhammad Mumtaz Malik, was placed in the forward area of the Hilli Municipality (under Hakimpur Upazila, Dinajpur District), in what was then East Pakistan. The regiment came under continuous and heavy air, artillery and armour attacks from the Indian Army. Despite enemy superiority in both numbers and firepower, Akram and his men repulsed many attacks, inflicting heavy casualties on the enemy. He was killed in action in the battle on 5 December 1971 and was posthumously awarded the Nishan-e-Haider, Pakistan's highest military honour.

He was buried in the village of Boaldar, Thana/Upozila-Hakimpur (Banglahilly), District-Dinajpur. There is a monument, Major Muhammad Akram Shaheed Memorial, in the middle of Jhelum city.

== Awards and decorations ==
Nishan-e-Haider Recipient
- Date: 1971
- Country: Islamic Republic of Pakistan
- Presented by: President Zulfiqar Ali Bhutto

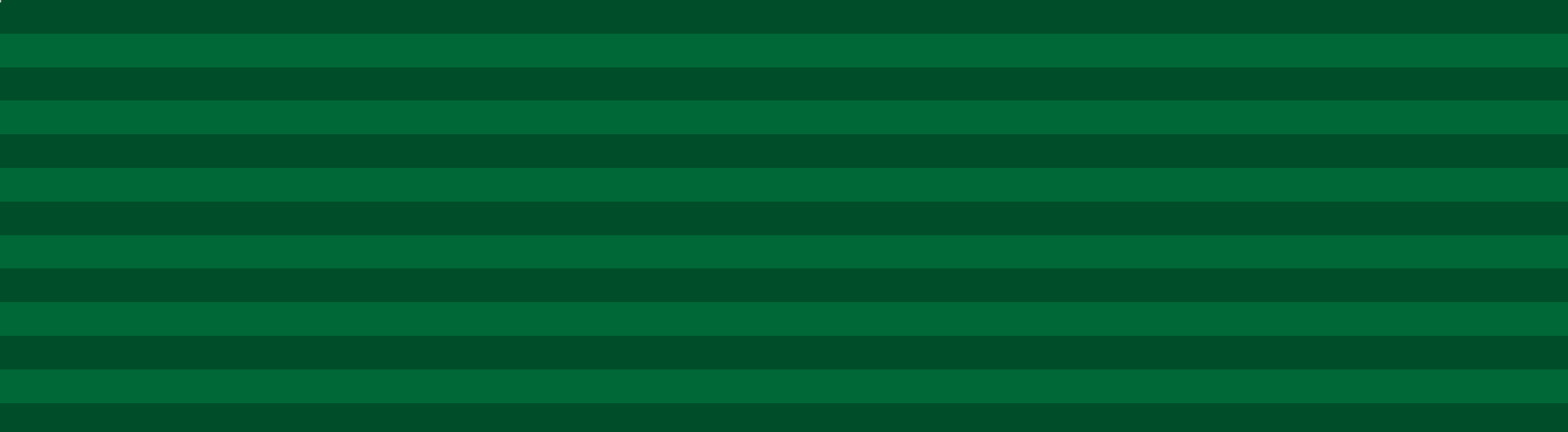

Nishan-e-Haider (Emblem of the Lion) 1971 War Posthumously		Sitara-e-Harb 1965 War (War Star 1965)	
Sitara-e-Harb 1971 War (War Star 1971) Posthumously	Tamgha-e-Jang 1965 War (War Medal 1965)	Tamgha-e-Jang 1971 War (War Medal 1971) Posthumously	Tamgha-e-Jamhuria (Republic Commemoration Medal) 1956
