= Sanjwal Cantonment =

Sanjwal Cantonment is a cantonment town in Attock district, Punjab province, Pakistan.

Many workers from the Pakistan Ordnance Factories (POF) reside in this town. This is a small cantonment, spanning 2.5 square kilometers. This cantonment consists of a government housing colony called Prime Minister Housing Colony POF Sanjwal.
