= Cadet College Ghotki =

Cadet college in Pakistan

Coordinates: 28.04818°N 69.45554°E

- Administration block
- Mirpur Mathelo, Sindh Pakistan; Sindh

Information
- Type: Military High School
- Motto: Striving For Excellence
- Established: 2010
- Area: 251 acres (1.02 km^{2})
- Colour: Red
- Demonym: Ghotkians
- Houses: 5
- Website: https://ccg.edu.pk/

Cadet College Ghotki is an educational institution from grade 7 to grade 12, in the northern province of Sindh, Pakistan. It is jointly run by the Government of Sindh and the Pakistan Army.

It is located about 90 km from Sukkur on the Grand Trunk Road/Pakistan National Highway leading to Rahimyar Khan District of the province of Punjab. The college was inaugurated in November 2010.

== Principals/Commandants ==
At the start of the college Prof. Nasim Ahmed Memon was appointed as the first and the pioneer Principal of Cadet College Ghotki who joined the college in 2010 and remained in the seat for five years till 2015. In his tenure the main structure of Cadet College Ghotki was developed such as sports grounds, administrative and academic blocks, cadets' Mess and hostels.

In 2015, Lt. Col. (R) Azhar Hussain Shah joined the college as second principal. He brought a revolutionary progress and development not only in academics but also in the infrastructure of the college. Security of the college was enhanced. New Lawns and gardens were made. Incomplete projects were completed and a shopping center, cafeteria and parade ground were built. He was the first principal to initiate holding the Annual Parents' Day in 2017. But, in December, 2017, he resigned and joined as deputy manager in Fauji Fertilizers Company, Mirpur Mathelo.

== Academics ==
The college prepares the boys for the Secondary School and Intermediate Examinations conducted by the Board of Intermediate and Secondary Education Sukkur. Cadets (Ghotkians) perform well in exams and until now they have given outstanding results in the examinations of 2015,2016,2017 & 2018 in the Sukkur Board of Intermediate and Secondary Education.

== Faculty and Staff ==
The faculty comprises two academic departments, Science and Humanities:

- Humanities: English, Urdu, Sindhi, Pakistan Studies and Islamic Education.
- Sciences: Mathematics, Physics, Chemistry, Biology and Computer Science.

Physical training and drill of the students is supervised by the Pak Army( serving) drill instructors. The other staff comprises the Administrative Officer, Doctor, Psychologist, Bursar, Resident Engineer, Khateeb for the Mosque and the requisite ministerial staff.

== Facilities and Miscellaneous ==
- Library
- Boarding Houses (Five Boarding Houses)
- Science Labs
- E-Learning Smart Classes are equipped with the latest technology
- Riding Club
- Shopping Center
- Mosque
- Parade Ground
- Play Grounds
- IT Lab
- Guest House (Available for Invited Visitors/Parents only)
- Barber Shop
- Fruit Shop (All types of fresh Juices & Milk Shakes are available)
- Cobbler Shop
- Garments Shop
- Tailor Shop
- vehicles

Sports

National level of Coaches for all sports are available throughout the year.

- Gymnasium
- Horse Riding Club (Saddle Club)
- Cricket
- Football
- Hockey
- Squash Courts
- Badminton Courts
- Volleyball
- Archery Club
- Gymnastics Club

Medical

The college has a Hospital (with an Ambulance Service available 24Hrs) headed by a senior doctor, with staff. For specialized treatment, the boys are sent to the DHQs hospital in Mirpur Mathelo or to the Combined Military Hospital (CMH) Pano Aqil Cantt.. Vaccination and inoculation are carried out periodically. Students are medically examined and an individual health record is maintained.

Recreational Activities and Co-curricular Activities

Picnics/Tours are arranged and the boys are taken to recreational spots in Pakistan as well as abroad (Turkey, United States of America and Malaysia). Educational visits are part of the training schedule at the college. Moreover, every passing out parade (twice a year) at Pakistan Military Academy (PMA) Kakul Abbottabad, is attended by more than 50 senior cadets (Ghotkians) of Cadet College Ghotki. Furthermore, in accordance with the academics calendar, Inter-house competitions, such as Declamation, Hifze Iqbal, Hifze Latif, Essay Writing, Science and GK quiz and Naat and Qiraat etc., are regularly conducted. Cadets also take part in different sports and stage competitions held throughout the province and country.

College Magazine and Newsletter

The College Magazine- Reflections- is published annually in two sections (English/Urdu). Besides, a Newsletter- Glimpses- is issued on a monthly basis.

== Admissions at Cadet College Ghotki ==
Admissions to the college are entertained to class VII, VIII, IX and XI subject to specific and general conditions as laid down:

Eligibility

a) Everyone is entitled to apply from Pakistan as well as from overseas. However, some reserved seats are also available for the sons of persons domiciled in Sindh. They are entitled to apply for admission against seats reserved for residents of each administrative division, i.e., Sukkur, Larkana, MirpurKhas, Shaheed Benazir abad, Hyderabad and Karachi.

b) Sons of persons domiciled in provinces other than Sindh, i.e., Punjab, Balochistan, Khyber-Pakhtunkhwa, Gilgit-Baltistan and Azad Jammu Kashmir.

c) Sons of serving or retired defence personnel (uniformed only).

Age and qualification 11 to 13 & 12 to 14 years for class VII & VIII. 13 to 14 years for class IX & 15 to 16 years for class XI (No relaxation in age is permissible). Candidates must have passed class VI for VII, VII for VIII, VIII for class IX and X for class XI or equivalent.
