= Cadet College Pasrur =

- Pasrur, Punjab; Pakistan

Information
- Type: Boarding school
- Established: 2011
- School district: Sialkot
- Principal: Lieutenant colonel Aleem Javaid
- Grades: 8th - 12th (F.Sc Pre medical & Pre engineering)
- Houses: Hamid House, Zahid House, Jinnah House, Tariq House, Qasim House and Haider House.
- Website: cadetcollegepasrur.edu.pk

Cadet College Pasrur is a boarding secondary school in Pasrur, Sialkot District, Pakistan.

== Background ==
The federal government approved the project in 2004.

== Affiliation ==
The College is affiliated with the Board of Intermediate and Secondary Education, Gujranwala for the Secondary School Certificate and Higher Secondary School Certificate.
