= Cadet College Mastung =

Cadet college in Pakistan

- کیڈٹ کالج مستونگ

Location
- RCD Highway, قومی شاہراہ ۲۵; Mastung, Balochistan; Pakistan
- Coordinates: 29°48′11″N 66°48′52″E

Information
- Motto: Enter to Learn and Go Forth to Serve
- Opened: 9 April 1987
- Principal: Brigadier Tariq Mahmood
- Gender: Boys
- Age: 12 to 19
- Enrollment: c. 360
- Area: 120 acres (49 ha)
- Colour: Maroon
- Demonym: Mastangs
- Wings (Houses): 4
- Website: www.cadetcollegemastung.edu.pk

Cadet College Mastung (Urdu: کیڈٹ کالج مستونگ, abbreviated as CCM) is a residential high school and college, for boys from grade seven up to twelve. It is located in district Mastung, Balochistan province Pakistan, on RCD Highway (N-25 National Highway) that leads 54 Km to Quetta in North, and 630 Km from Karachi. It covers an area of 120 acres (0.49 km2).

== History ==
The Project of establishing a Cadet College in Balochistan was conceived in March 1976. The President of Pakistan gave his blessings in 1979 and it's PC-I approved in 1981. Current site of this college was selected in 1982. Whereas, the construction of first two phases started in 1983. The college became operational on April 9, 1987 with the induction of first batch (entry) of 60 cadets.

== Organizational structure ==
Cadet College Mastung has a large organizational body. The leading commandment is subdivided into three bodies with different domains to look after.

- Vice Principal: Academics and accommodation
- Administration: Admin, bursar, messing & medical
- Adjutant: Security, discipline, co-curricular activities

== Houses ==
The college is divided into four houses and represented with the following colors:

Iqbal House Jinnah House Omer House Haider House
