= Army Education Corps (India) =

Indian military unit

- Abbreviation: AEC
- Predecessor: Indian Army Education Corps
- Formation: 01 June 1921
- Type: Education
- Headquarters: Indian Army HQ, New Delhi
- Location: Pachmarhi, Madhya Pradesh
- Additional Director General Army Education: Maj Gen Tamojeet Biswas, ADG MT (AE)
- Parent organisation: Indian Army
- Website: Army Education Corps

The Army Educational Corps of India is a program run by the Indian Army that develops soldiers and officers of all ranks in a variety of disciplines. The centre provides education in both combat and non-combat operations.

The Corps' facilities are located in Pachmarhi, Madhya Pradesh state. In September 2025, the Army, Navy, and Air Force education branches were combined to form the Tri-Services Education Corps.

== History ==
Army Educational Corps Training College and Centre, Pachmarhi has its origin dating back to 24 Apr 1921 when the British Indian Army HQ India, established the Army School of Education with two separate wings, namely, the British Wing at Wellington and the Indian Wing at Belgaum in 1924. General HQ India decided to amalgamate the two wings under one commandant in view of the economy drive of the government and to establish a centralized control over both wings of the school. Accordingly, the British Wing was moved from Wellington to Belgaum on 11 Nov 1924 to form the Army School of Education India, Belgaum . The schools got amalgamated under one commandant in 1931. The orders were issued for final integration of both the wings of the Army School of Education; thus in Oct 1931 both the wings i.e. the British and Indian wings were combined.

Another historical development took place in Oct 1939 when the Army School of Education India moved from Belgaum to Pachmarhi to cope with the war time education and the release period education schemes during and after World War-II. With India getting Independence in 1947, the Army School of Education, India, was raised as Army School of Education, Pachmarhi. Army Educational Corps Records office was established in the same year as part of the school. The school was again redesignated as AEC Centre and School, Pachmarhi in 1949. AEC Centre and School was redesignated as AEC Training College and Centre after it was affiliated to Dr. Hari Singh Gaur Vishwavidyalaya, Sagar, in 1961. This affiliation marked the introduction of degree courses - Bachelor of Education in 1961, Bachelor of Library Science in 1962, later renamed as Bachelor of Library and Info Science in 1981, and Diploma in Audio-visual and fundamental education in 1962, later upgraded to a degree course named as Bachelor of Education Technology. On 26 May 1985, the College attained the status of an Autonomous College under the same university. The autonomy was initially granted for a period of three years up to 1988 and later extended from time to time. As per the policy of the Government of MP, the jurisdiction of University of MP was restructured on geographical proximity and thus wef 1995, this autonomous college was affiliated to Barkatullah Universities, Bhopal.

The Educational training of the Indian Army started with the establishment of the East India Company. There was neither a regular army nor a uniform system for training of troops in till the beginning of the eighteenth century.

The Educational system was evolved for the Company's army for their own benefit and because of the persistent demand of the men. As the Company army comprised the British troops, the Company's European troops and the Indian troops, the Educational training was separately evolved for them. The nature of the Company army, the socio-political and military development both in and were the prime factors responsible for the establishment of an Educational system for the army.

The beginning of an educational system for the army in can be traced back to the establishment of the British Regimental Schools. Some of the British Regiments had brought sergeants with them for the purpose of imparting instructions to their troops. But the number of schoolmasters and mistresses were negligible in proportion to the strength of the troops. As a result, the commanding officers were permitted to appoint educationally qualified non- commissioned officers as acting masters. The Company's European troops made a similar request for the provision of educational facilities for them and their children. The Company and the masters acceded to the request and mistresses were posted in Regimental Schools for European troops to impart instruction to their troops and their children. Under the patronage of Warren Hastings, the then Governor General and Commander-in-Chief of India, a number of Regimental schools were opened and barrack libraries were established for European troops in between 1774 and 1785.

The Indian sepoys formed a major part of the Company's army and their number continuously increased to reach 2,14,000 in 1856. Indian troops belonged to various castes, tribes and religions. Some part of general education was required for them as they were basically illiterate but the East India Company, which by then had transformed itself from a commercial concern to a political organisation and was busy with the task of conquest and consolidation of British power in India, had neither time nor inclination for the education of Indian sepoys. The following factors compelled the Company to make provisions for educational facilities for the Indian troops:

- To keep pace with the general development in the field of education in the army. The educational facilities had been provided to the British troops and the Company's European troops and the education for the Indian troops who formed the bulk of the Company's army could no longer be ignored.
- To keep pace with the general development in the field of civil education
- Wood's despatch laid the foundation of a sound educational system for the Indians. In the wake of general awareness amongst the masses the East India Company could no longer ignore the education of Indian sepoys.

== ADGAE of Educational Corps ==
1.  BRIG SJ MUKAND                         13. MAJ GEN JS GHUMMAN, VSM
2.  BRIG PG SAPATNEKER                     14. MAJ GEN SS NAIR, AVSM
3.  BRIG RL MULLICK                        15. MAJ GEN SANDEEP KUMAR, VSM
4.  BRIG KS MENON, AVSM                    16. MAJ GEN PRANAB CHAKRABORTY, VSM
5.  BRIG SS NAKRA, AVSM                    17. MAJ GEN SUNIL CHANDRA, VSM
6.  MAJ GEN DN CHIBBER, AVSM               18. MAJ GEN GK CHOPRA, VSM
7.  MAJ GEN PD SHARMA,AVSM                 19. MAJ GEN DEBASISH ROY
8.  MAJ GEN DK CHAWLA                      20. MAJ GEN AK VYAS
9.  MAJ GEN KN SARDANA, AVSM, VSM          21. MAJ GEN DEVESH GAUR
10. MAJ GEN OP PARMAR                      22. MAJ GEN R PUTARJUNAM
11. MAJ GEN MPS TYAGI, VSM                 23. MAJ GEN VK BHATT, VSM
12. MAJ GEN KN BHATT,AVSM                  24. MAJ GEN TAMOJEET BISWAS
