= Military Lands and Cantonments Department =

Ministry of Defense in Pakistan

- Formation: Cantonment Act 1924 and 2023
- Type: Government Department
- Legal status: Active
- Purpose: Administration of cantonment boards and military land nationwide
- Headquarters: Rawalpindi, Pakistan
- Region served: Nationwide
- Director General: Major General Irfan Ahmed Malik HI (M)
- Main organ: Directorate of Military Land and Cantonment
- Website: mlc.gov.pk

The Military Lands and Cantonments Department (ML&C) is an executive department of the Ministry of Defense in Pakistan. Its mission is to ensure pro-people, effective local governance in cantonments and effective defense land management. Across Pakistan, there are 11 Military Estate (ME) circles and 44 cantonments covering 306,341 acres of land. According to the 2017 census, about 4.7 million people live in cantonments.

== History ==
The Cantonment Act of 1924, originally implemented during the British colonial period, was abolished by the Government of India shortly after gaining independence from British rule. Nevertheless, in Pakistan, this change took 76 years to occur. An amendment to Section 2 of the Cantonment Act of 1924 has resulted in an extension of the jurisdiction of the Cantonment Board.

=== Post-amendment changes ===
The Cantonment Act of 2023 is now in effect nationwide, encompassing the Rawalpindi and Chaklala Cantonment Boards. This update broadens their authority, permitting them to utilize excess land for various purposes, such as commercial and residential use. This expansion of the Cantonment Board's jurisdiction is made possible by an amendment to Section 2 of the 1924 Cantonment Act.

According to the Cantonment Act of 2023, a new body known as the Directorate of Military Land and Cantonment is set to be formed. The main office for this directorate will be situated in either Rawalpindi or Islamabad, with additional regional offices to be established nationwide. A Major General from the Pakistan Army will be appointed as the Director General of the Directorate General of Military Land and Cantonment for an initial two-year term, which could be extended at the discretion of the Federal Government.

== Regional headquarters ==
Military Lands and Cantonments have six regions that cover the whole country including Gilgit Baltistan and Azad Jammu Kashmir. Each region is supervised by the Director, a BS-20 Officer of ML&C Dept.

Major functions of Director ML&C Deptt are:

- Macro Managers at Regional Level

- Competent Financial Authority for approval of Cantonments Budget

- Exercise delegated powers related to recruitment, land and municipal management

- RHQ Peshawar
- RHQ Rawalpindi
- RHQ Lahore
- RHQ Multan
- RHQ Karachi
- RHQ Quetta

== Field Offices ==
- ME Circle Peshawar

- ME Circle Kohat

- ME Circle Abbottabad

- ME Circle Rawalpindi

- ME Circle Gujranwala

- ME Circle Lahore

- ME Circle Sargodha

- ME Circle Multan

- ME Circle Hyderabad

- ME Circle Karachi

- ME Circle Quetta

== Controversies ==
=== Director general post ===
The continuous appointment of military officers serving since 1999 as civilian cadre of the Director General (DG) Military Lands and Cantonments is in violation of the Supreme Court's June 2013 judgment.

=== Commercial usage of land ===
In November 2021, the Supreme Court observed that the conversion of Cantonment Boards' lands for private purposes is against the Cantonment Boards Act and its Land Administration Rules. Stating that the land reserved for COD and airport purposes cannot be allowed to run marriage halls.
