= Petaro =

Coordinates: 25°31′N 68°18′E

Petaro (Urdu: پٹارو) is a small town in Jamshoro District near Hyderabad, Sindh, Pakistan. Cadet College Petaro, administered by the Pakistan Navy, is also located at Petaro.

Recently Jamshoro got the status of a district, therefore, Petaro town is a part of Jamshoro District.

== Demographics ==
The population of Petaro, according to the 2017 census, was 18,952.
