= Military College Sui =

Coordinates: 28.66406°N 69.178167°E

- Sui, Balochistan; Pakistan

Information
- Type: Military school
- Motto: Knowledge and Awareness
- Established: 3 January 2011
- Faculty: 24
- Grades: 8th - 12th
- Enrollment: 440 to 470
- Houses: 5
- Color: Navy Blue
- Mascot: Bolanian

Military College Sui is a military school located in the town of Sui in the Balochistan province of Pakistan. It is owned and operated by the Pakistan Army and feeds the Pakistan Military Academy, Kakul.

Previously, it was known as Sui Cantonment.

== History ==
It was established in 2011. 60 percent of seats were reserved for the students of Balochistan.
