= Korea Combat Training Center =

- 육군과학화전투훈련단
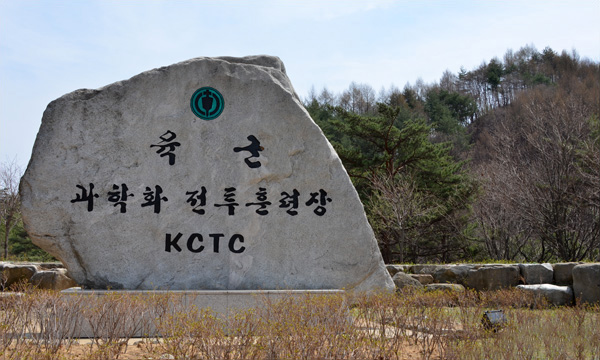
- Korea Combat Training Center ground
- Active: April 2002 – present
- Country: South Korea
- Branch: Republic of Korea Army
- Type: Training unit
- Role: Combat training
- Size: Group
- Part of: Army Training & Doctrine Command
- Garrison/HQ: Inje County, Gangwon Province
- Nickname(s): Scorpion unit
- Colors: Green, Black
- Equipment: Multiple integrated laser engagement system
- Decorations: Republic of Korea Presidential Unit Citation 2015
- Website: Korea Combat Training Center (Korean)

Commanders
- Current commander: Maj. Gen. Jeong Hyeong-gyun

The Korea Combat Training Center (abbreviated KCTC; Korean: 육군과학화전투훈련단, Hanja: 陸軍科學化戰鬪訓鍊團) is a South Korean military training unit for the ROK Army and Marine Corps. It is one of the subordinate elements of the Republic of Korea Army Training & Doctrine Command.

== Combat training ==
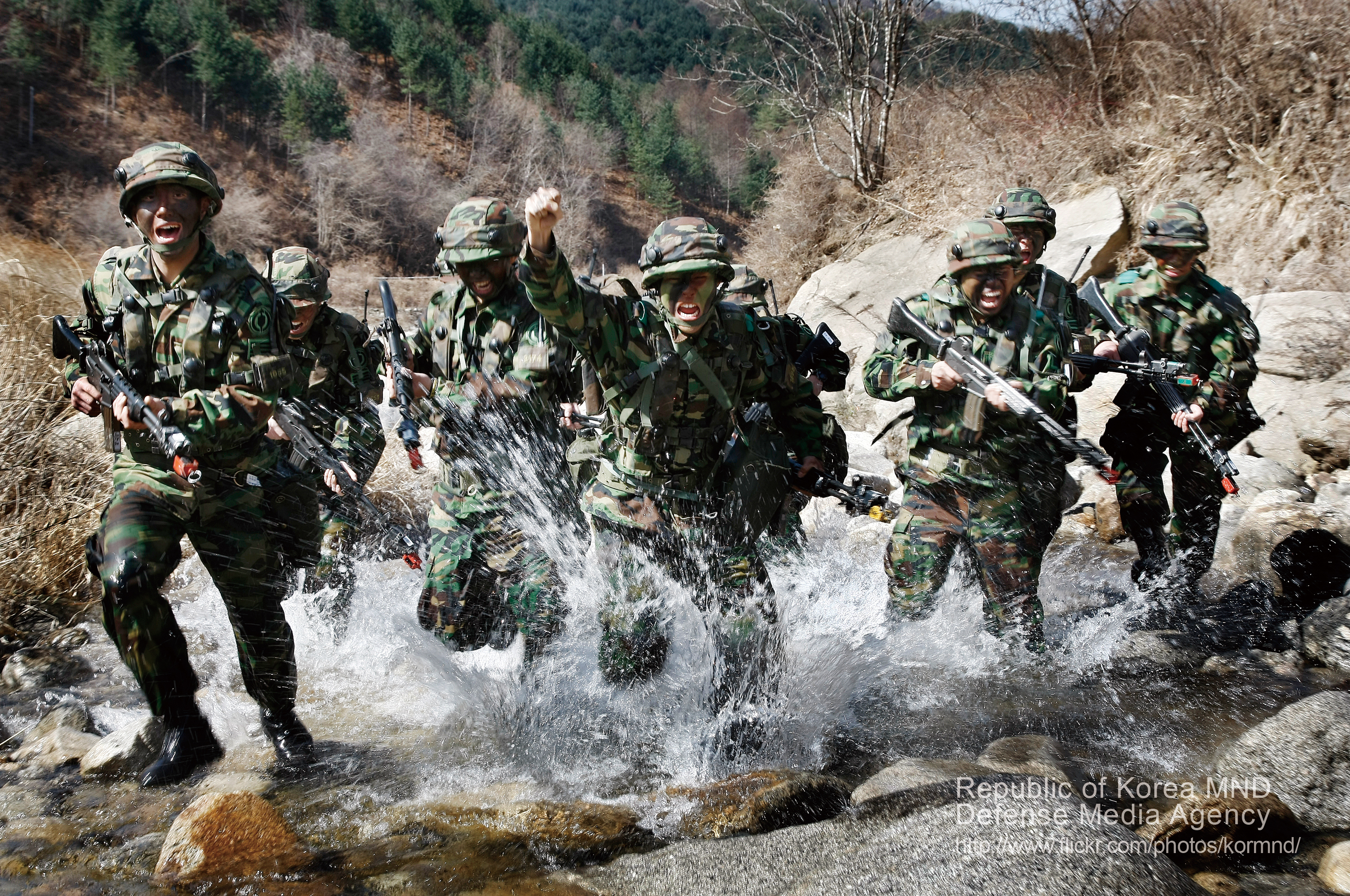
KCTC OPFOR unit

The multiple integrated laser engagement system (MILES) has been used for simulated combat exercises at the Korea Combat Training Center. The KCTC largely adopted the systems of the National Training Center (NTC) and the Joint Readiness Training Center (JRTC) in the beginning, but later developed its own battlefield simulation system.

The KCTC Opposing Force (OPFOR, Korean: 전문대항군) representing the Korean People's Army Ground Force serves as the North Korean counterpart for the trainees. It employs North Korean military doctrine and simulates North Korean equipment to replicate the strength and tactics of the North Korean Army infantry force. Along with the expansion of the training center, the OPFOR has become a regiment-sized unit since 2015.

By establishing simulation systems for the Army aviation and the Air Force, the KCTC plans to start regiment-level training that includes AirLand Battle drills in 2016.

== Training participants ==
- Infantry divisions of Ground Operations Command
- Republic of Korea Marine Corps
- Republic of Korea Army Special Forces
- Korea Military Academy
- Korea Army Officer Candidate School
- Korea Army Academy at Yeongcheon
- Reserve Officers' Training Corps
