= Gadeukbong =

Mountain in Inje, South Korea

Highest point
- Elevation: 1,059.7 m (3,477 ft)
- Coordinates: 37°50′40″N 128°11′58″E

Geography
- Location: South Korea

Korean name
- Hangul: 가득봉
- Hanja: 可得峰
- RR: Gadeukbong
- MR: Kadŭkpong

Gadeukbong (Korean: 가득봉) is a mountain in Inje County, Gangwon Province, South Korea. It has an elevation of 1,059.7 m (3,477 ft).

== See also ==
- List of mountains in Korea
