= Officer Training School ROKAF =

South Korean military school

The Officer Training School (Korean: 공군 학사사관) is a Republic of Korea Air Force commissioning program held at the Republic of Korea Air Force Education and Training Command, Jinju. It is a part of Basic Military Training Wing. The current Commander, Air Force Education and Training Command is Maj Gen Jaewon Yoon.

The OTS is the largest commissioning source in the ROKAF for junior officers, Korea Air Force Academy being second and ROTC third.

Interested applicants sit for the Air Force Officer Selection Test which covers college level topics related to the specific major areas one is applying. The undergraduate GPA and the Korean college entrance exam score are usually not considered. There are different admission quota for women, pilot candidates, academy lecturers, judge advocates and language specialists (also known as interpreter officers).

== Basic Officer Training ==
Excluding the first week of orientation, BOT is a 15-week course for college graduates pursuing a commission in the ROKAF. The platoon and flight leaders who are usually lieutenants and captains are responsible for much of the in-processing and administration for the orientation week. The class is organized into the OT Wing, OT Squadrons (usually three)), and OT Flights (one or more per squadron depending on class size). BOT classes are designated by numerical sequence of their graduation (e.g., Class 108 means 108th Class). Trainees are given ranks of officer candidate.

Typically, personnel applying to BOT have baccalaureate level degrees in either technical or non-technical fields. Technical fields may include Computer Science, Electrical Engineering, and other fields in high demand by the Air Force. Non-technical degrees are more common, and therefore applying with a degree in such a field is very competitive. Applicants can apply for rated or non-rated positions. Rated positions are flying related -- Pilot, Navigator, or Air Battle Manager. Non-rated fall into 2 categories: non-rated ops, such as Intelligence or Weather, and non-rated support, such as Maintenance, Logistics, or Communications.

Areas of instruction include military customs and courtesies, military history, leadership, officership, field exercises, drill and ceremonies, and small arms training.

The first eight weeks of training are geared toward indoctrination. The focus is on physical training, drill and ceremonies, and standardization. OTs will be expected to work with their fellow flight and squadron members to accomplish specific tasks as required by their Flight Commander. There are constant bullying by the drill instructors.

To graduate, OTs must exceed physical standards (OTs track and train to these standards), academic standards, and military bearing standards. Military bearing includes the ability to write and brief, lead the flight, and perform duties within the OT Wing.

Upon graduation, graduates become Second Lieutenants (O-1) in the Republic of Korea Air Force.

== The History of OTS ==
There are total of 132 classes in the OTS so far.

== OTS as compared to the Academy and ROTC ==
There are three ways to become an officer in the Republic of Korea Air Force which are the Korea Air Force Academy, Reserve Officer Training Corps, or Officer Training School.

Officer Training School is the most expedient way to become an officer in the Air Force. It is challenging, physically and mentally demanding, and is typically the route that many Korean males who did not serve his military obligation earlier takes. Graduates are nicknamed "short term" officer or "sa-hoo".

The Korea Air Force Academy is a in-depth training officer candidates can pursue. While at the academy, cadets are immersed into the Air Force way of life: officer candidates train in field training exercises, flight training, and general sports. Graduates earn a Bachelor of Science degree in their chosen major. They are nicknamed "gongsa".

The Reserve Officer Training Corps is active at a few colleges in Korea. Upon completion of the program and receipt of their bachelor's degree, they are commissioned.

Each commissioning source produces a 2nd Lieutenant.

== Notable graduates ==
- Chang Sung-hwan

== See also ==
- Korea Army Officer Candidate School
