= Gaeinsan =

Mountain in South Korea

Highest point
- Elevation: 1,341 m (4,400 ft)
- Coordinates: 37°52′N 128°24′E

Geography
- Location: South Korea

Korean name
- Hangul: 개인산
- Hanja: 開仁山
- RR: Gaeinsan
- MR: Kaeinsan

Gaeinsan (Korean: 개인산) is a mountain in the counties of Inje and Hongcheon, Gangwon Province, South Korea. It has an elevation of 1,341 m (4,400 ft).

== See also ==
- List of mountains in Korea
