= Every Singaporean Son – Epilogue =

- Country of origin: Singapore
- No. of episodes: 6

Production
- Running time: 6–8 minutes

Original release
- Network: YouTube
- Release: August 17 – October 27, 2011

Related
- Every Singaporean Son; Every Singaporean Son II – The Making of an Officer; Ah Boys to Men; Ah Boys to Men 2; The Recruit Diaries

Every Singaporean Son – Epilogue is a Singaporean documentary released in 2011. This is the aftermath from the first season of Every Singaporean Son. 6 episodes will be released, down 12 episodes from the previous season. The first episode airs on 17 August 2011 on YouTube, each clip lasted for 6 to 8 minutes.

The series branched out to its second season of Every Singaporean Son, premiering every Thursday of the week, starting from 16 August 2012, and named Every Singaporean Son II – The Making of an Officer, concentrating on a batch of cadets training to be officers in OCS Officer Cadet School, and lasting for 20 to 25 episodes.

== Plot ==
It has been past a year since our 15 recruits endured the compulsory 9 weeks of Basic Military Training. In this season, only 6 will showcase how are they coping after their BMT and the unit life that they each is facing. The documentary is split into 6 episodes allowing all pre-enlistees and parents understand the life after BMT.

== Cast ==
- Episode 1: 3SG Muhd Nabil – Instructor, Leopard Company, Basic Military Training Centre
- Episode 2: 2SG Lemuel Teo – Platoon Sergeant, 6th Battalion, Singapore Infantry Regiment (6 SIR)
- Episode 3: CPL Daryl Lim – Aviation Vehicle Specialist, Airfield Maintenance Squadron, Sembawang Air Base
- Episode 4: 2LT Douglas Wong – Military Transport Officer, Transport Hub West, Sungei Gedong Camp
- Episode 5: CPL Muhd Syabil – Security Trooper, 8th Battalion, Singapore Infantry Regiment (8 SIR)
- Episode 6: CPL Dom Ang (Shaoquan) – Sea Soldier, Tuas Defence Squadron

== Episodes ==
No.	Title	Cast name	Original release date
1	"The Mentor"	3SG Muhd Nabil	August 17, 2011
2	"The Platoon Sergeant"	2SG Lemuel Teo	August 31, 2011
3	"The Heavy Duty Team Player"	CPL Daryl Lim	September 15, 2011
4	"The Transport Commander"	2LT Douglas Wong	September 29, 2011
5	"A Soldier, On and Off Duty"	CPL Muhd Syabil	October 13, 2011
6	"The Unsung Hero"	CPL Dom Ang (Shaoquan)	October 27, 2011
