= Every Singaporean Son =

- Country of origin: Singapore
- No. of episodes: 18 episodes (Cyberpioneer, YouTube and National Geographic Channel); 7 episodes (Mediacorp Channel 5)

Production
- Running time: 6-8 minutes

Original release
- Network: YouTube; National Geographic Channel; Mediacorp Channel 5
- Release: July 7 – November 1, 2010

Related
- Every Singaporean Son – Epilogue; Every Singaporean Son II – The Making of an Officer; Ah Boys to Men; Ah Boys to Men 2; The Recruit Diaries

Every Singaporean Son is a Singaporean documentary released in 2010. It serves as an education tool for all pre-enlistees during their Basic Military Training in Singapore. Most of the episodes were filmed at Pulau Tekong. 18 episodes were released. The first episode airs on 7 July 2010 on YouTube, subsequent episodes were released on every Tuesday, each clip lasted for 6 to 8 minutes.

The 18-part series was filmed between 5 February 2010 to 8 April 2010.

National Geographic Channel ordered the series and it will be aired in six episodes (30 minutes per episode) from 8 March 2011.

In August 2011, the season branched out to another 6-part series named: Every Singaporean Son – Epilogue.

The documentary was nominated for "Best Cross-Platform Content" at the 16th Asian Television Awards 2011, but the series lost to the Indian series The CJ Show.

On 16 August 2012, the series branched out to its second season of Every Singaporean Son, premiering every Thursday of the week. It was named: Every Singaporean Son II – The Making of an Officer. The series concentrated on a batch of cadets training to be officers in OCS Officer Cadet School and lasted 21 episodes. That same year, the series was loosely adapted to highly successful local movies directed by local celebrity film director Jack Neo known as Ah Boys to Men and Ah Boys to Men 2, which were also filmed in Pulau Tekong as well.

The show aired on Mediacorp Channel 5 on Mondays at 7pm from 31 March 2014 to 5 May 2014, each episode lasted for 30 minutes (including commercial breaks), the 18 short episode series was compacted into 7 episodes.

== Plot ==
In nine weeks, 15 young men from different backgrounds came together for the rite of passage that every Singaporean son must experience, which is to survive the 9 weeks of Basic Military Training. The documentary is split into 18 episodes allowing all pre-enlistees and parents understand the life in BMT.

== Cast ==
=== Recruits ===
All the recruits were from the BMTC School 2 Orion Company Platoon 1 Section 4.

- REC Muhd Nabil
- REC Loh De Wei
- REC Muhd Syabil
- REC Dudley Lin
- REC Chandra Thiaghu
- REC Kenneth Ng
- REC Justin Mark
- REC Goh Qingwei
- REC Danial Hakim
- REC Douglas Wong
- REC Lemuel Teo
- REC Huang Guoquan
- REC Daryl Lim
- REC Shawn Lee
- REC Dom Ang (Shaoquan)

=== Superiors ===
- CPT Roger Chen - Officer Commanding
- 2LT Shamsul - Platoon Commander
- 3SG Glen Liang - Section Commander
- 2SG Hanafee - Platoon Sergeant

== Episodes ==
No.	Title	Original release date
1	"My Buddy"	July 7, 2010
2	"Where I Stand"	July 12, 2010
3	"Strip"	July 19, 2010
4	"R&R - Run & Rehab"	July 26, 2010
5	"How Far?"	August 2, 2010
6	"Sharpshooter"	August 9, 2010
7	"Field Discipline"	August 16, 2010
8	"Cover Me"	August 23, 2010
9	"Breaking Point"	August 30, 2010
10	"Grenade!"	September 6, 2010
11	"Step Up!"	September 13, 2010
12	"The Not-So-Low Wall"	September 20, 2010
13	"Too Fast Too Furious"	September 28, 2010
14	"Book Out!"	October 4, 2010
15	"Personal Triumphs And Defeats"	October 11, 2010
16	"Island Party"	October 18, 2010
17	"Brothers In Arms"	October 25, 2010
18	"We Are Soldiers"	November 1, 2010

== Film adaptation ==
In November 2012, Jack Neo revealed he had been approached by MINDEF to edit footages from this documentary into a film, and that after much deliberation, Neo decided not to use the footages and instead write a brand new script in adapting the series to film, which became Ah Boys to Men and Ah Boys to Men 2.
