= Bangtaesan =

Mountain in South Korea

Highest point
- Elevation: 1,444 m (4,738 ft)
- Listing: Mountains of Korea
- Coordinates: 37°53′41″N 128°21′20″E

Geography
- Country: South Korea

Korean name
- Hangul: 방태산
- Hanja: 芳台山
- RR: Bangtaesan
- MR: Pangt'aesan

Bangtaesan (Korean: 방태산) is a mountain in Inje County, Gangwon Province, South Korea. It has an elevation of 1,444 m (4,738 ft).
