= Kim Yong-hyu =

South Korean general (1926–2022)

- Born: 10 August 1926; Chungcheongnam-do, Korea
- Died: 20 September 2022 (aged 96)
- Occupation(s): Soldier, politician

Korean name
- Hangul: 김용휴
- Hanja: 金容烋
- RR: Gim Yonghyu
- MR: Kim Yonghyu

Kim Yong-hyu (10 August 1926 – 20 September 2022) was a Brigadier General of South Korea.

== Military career ==
Kim was born on 10 August 1926 in Chungcheongnam-do in what is today South Korea. He was a graduate of the 7th class of the Korea Military Academy, and in 1957 became the chief of staff of the 2nd Division of the Republic of Korea Armed Forces. In 1960, he became a regimental commander in the 20th Division, and in 1961 the chief of staff of the 8th Division. After Park Chung-hee's coup in May that year, he worked in the Department of the Army. In 1962, he was appointed commander of the 21st Regiment in the 8th Division. He was appointed the deputy commander of the South Korean forces in Vietnam in August 1966.

== In politics ==
Kim was named Vice-Minister of National Defense on 6 October 1978. In the aftermath of the 1979 assassination of Park Chung-hee, the new government considered promoting him to Minister of National Defense. However, he instead went on to serve as Minister of Government Administration (총무처 장관) from 14 December 1979 until 20 May 1982. In the latter position, he presided over mass firings of government officials in 1980 which saw 4,760 bureaucrats in various departments and regions dismissed for reasons ranging from corruption, disclosure of official secrets, incompetence, or failure to meet physical fitness requirements.

== Death ==
Kim died on 20 September 2022, at the age of 96.
