= KCTC =

KCTC may refer to:

- Korea Combat Training Center, a military training center located in Inje County, Gangwon Province, South Korea
- Kentucky Community and Technical College System, a system of public education in Kentucky, United States
- KCTC-LP, a low-power radio station (98.1 FM) licensed to serve San Antonio, Texas, United States
- KIFM (AM), a radio station (1320 AM) in West Sacramento, California, United States
