= Jeombongsan =

Mountain in Gangwon Province, South Korea

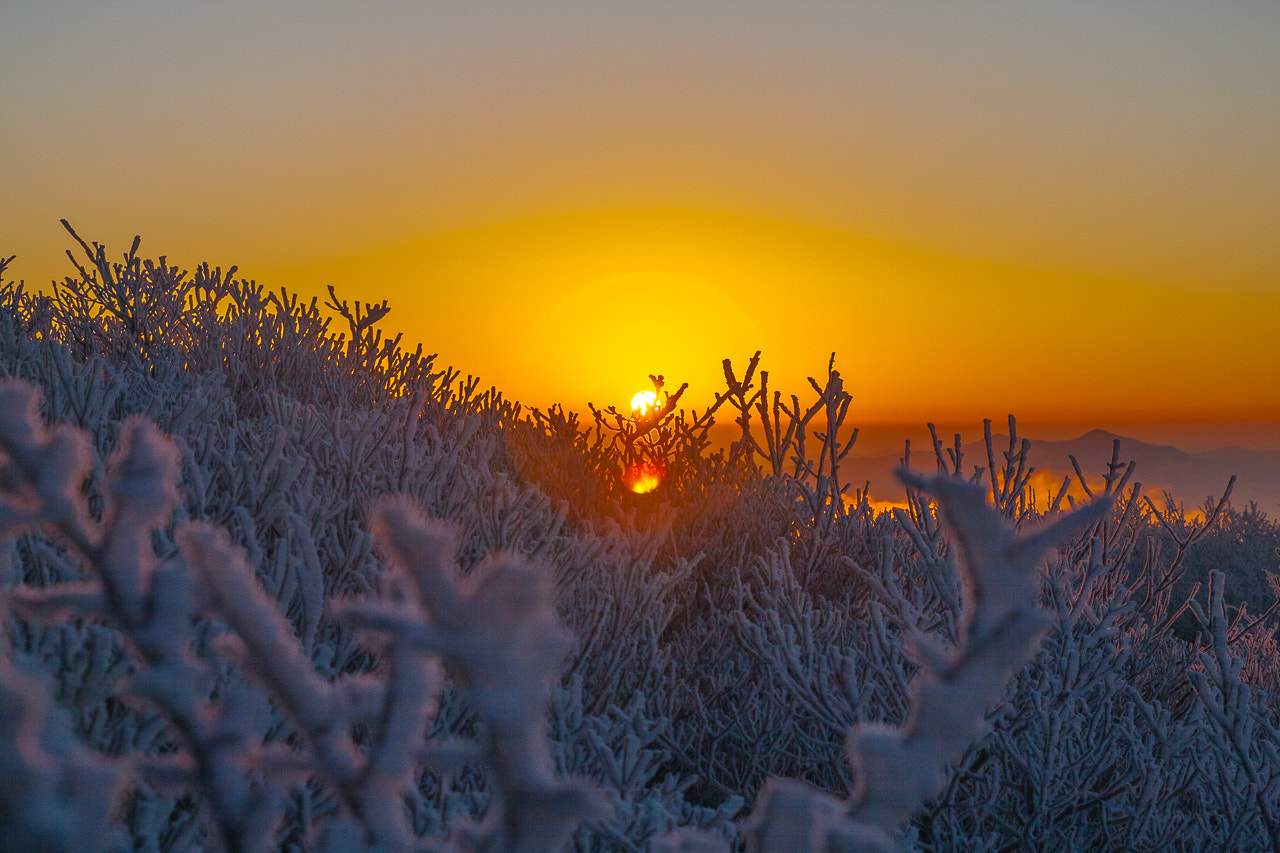

Highest point
- Elevation: 1,424.2 m (4,673 ft)
- Coordinates: 38°02′57″N 128°25′39″E

Geography
- Location: South Korea

Korean name
- Hangul: 점봉산
- Hanja: 點鳳山
- RR: Jeombongsan
- MR: Chŏmbongsan

Jeombongsan (Korean: 점봉산) is a mountain between the counties of Inje and Yangyang, Gangwon Province, South Korea. It has an elevation of 1,424.2 m (4,673 ft).

== See also ==
- List of mountains in Korea
