= Republic of Korea military academies =

Korean military academies for undergraduate and officer training

The Republic of Korea military academies are military institutions for undergraduate education and training of commissioned officers of the Republic of Korea Armed Forces.

- Army - Korea Military Academy (육군사관학교)
- Army - Korea Army Academy at Yeongcheon (육군3사관학교)
- Navy - Republic of Korea Naval Academy (해군사관학교)
- Air Force - Republic of Korea Air Force Academy (공군사관학교)
