= Inje-eup =

- Town
- Panoramic view of Inje-eup

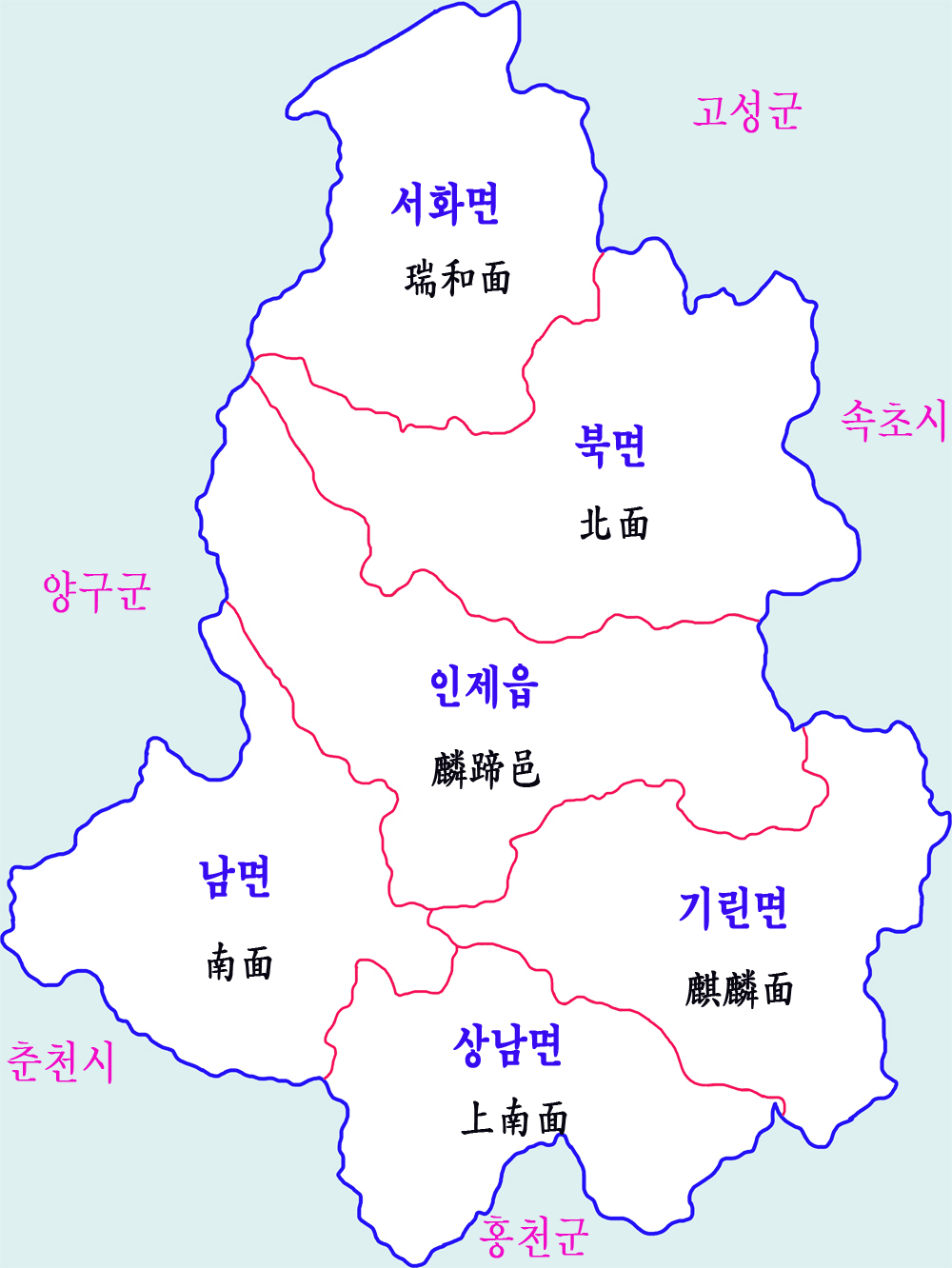
- Map of the County of Inje

- Location of Pyeongchang-eup in South Korea
- Coordinates: 38°8′49.1″N 128°14′49.92″E
- Country: South Korea
- Province: Gangwon
- County: Inje
- Administrative divisions: 20 ri

Area
  - Total: 315.15 km^{2} (121.68 sq mi)

Population (2011)
  - Total: 9,961
  - Density: 31.61/km^{2} (81.86/sq mi)
- Time zone: UTC+9 (Korea Standard Time)

Korean name
- Hangul: 인제읍
- Hanja: 麟蹄邑
- RR: Inje-eup
- MR: Inje-ŭp

Inje-eup (Korean: 인제읍) is a town in and the seat of the county of Inje, Gangwon Province, South Korea. The town has a surface area of 315.15 km^{2} (121.68 sq mi) and a population of 9,961.
