= Korea Army Academy at Yeongcheon =

Military academy of the Republic of Korea Army

Korea Army Academy (Yeongcheon)
- 육군3사관학교
- Motto: Country, Honor, Valor (조국,명예,충용)
- Type: Military academy
- Established: October 15, 1968
- Superintendent: Maj. Gen. Ko Chang-Jun
- Location: Yeongcheon, South Korea
- Website: www.kaay.mil.kr

Korean name
- Hangul: 육군3사관학교
- Hanja: 陸軍三士官學校
- RR: Yukgun 3 sagwan hakgyo
- MR: Yukkun 3 sagwan hakkyo

Korea Army Academy (Yeongcheon) or KAAY is a military academy of the Republic of Korea Army for training officer cadets. Commonly known as "Choongsungdae" (Korean: 충성대, Hanja: 忠誠臺) as a reference to its loyalty and devotion to the country, it produces the largest number of junior officers in the Korean Army. The current Superintendent of the academy is Major General Ko Chang-Jun

== Campus ==
The main campus is located in Yeongcheon, a south district of North Gyeongsang Province, South Korea. Certain areas of the campus is open to the public on weekends. According to the academy's official website, reservations for visits must be made at least one week in advance.

== Admission ==
The academy only accepts students who have completed their 1st and 2nd year of undergraduate studies (or an equivalent qualification recognized by the academy), and trains only junior and senior cadets (i.e. 3rd and 4th year of undergraduate studies).

== Education ==
All cadets graduate with a bachelor's degree with majors in military science and another chosen major and are commissioned as 2nd lieutenant of the Korean army. KAAY also actively engages in exchange partnerships with nearby US military units including USAG Daegu, 19th ESC, and Camp Mujuk.

== See also ==
- Republic of Korea military academies
- Korea Military Academy (ROK Army)
- Korea Air Force Academy
- Korea Naval Academy
- Korea Army Officer Candidate School
- List of national universities in South Korea
- List of universities and colleges in South Korea
- Education in Korea
- United States senior military college (SMC)
