= Republic of Korea Air Force Education and Training Command =

South Korean military base

Republic of Korea Air Force Education and Training Command (AFETC, Hangul: 공군 교육사령부, Hanja: 空軍 敎育司令部), located in Jinju, was established 1973. The command is one of the major commands of the Republic of Korea Air Force. The total area of the base is about 1.1 million square meters.

== History ==
The Command traces its origin to the Air Education Unit founded in April 1951 in Daegu. In 1952 it was moved from Daegu to Daejon, and in 1956, its name was changed to the Technical Training Group. A few years later, in 1973 it was changed again to the Air Force Education and Training Command. In October 1988 it was moved from Daejon to its current location in Jinju.

== Current manpower ==
In 2005, the total number of personnel was 10,600 which includes 5,500 military trainees (1,000 officer candidates, 1,300 NCO candidates and 3,200 airmen basic).

== Mission ==
The mission of the command is to provide specialized education and training for

- elite pilot training
- basic military training
- technical training
- technical high school education
- reserve forces training

== Air Force University ==
Located in Daejon, the Air University conducts professional military education (PME), graduate education and professional continuing education for officers, enlisted members and civilians throughout their careers. It is noted for courses in national security and military leadership, air operations. Other courses for military professionals are Command & Staff Course (CSC) and Squadron Officer Course (SOC), with total enrollment of 600.

== Basic Military Training Wing ==
The wing consists of the Officer Training School and NCO Training School. The mission of the wing is to train officers/NCOs/airmen of ROKAF. During the basic training, Taekwondo, NBR, and marksmanship are taught. The wing trains about 25,000 annually.

== Air Force Aviation and Science High School ==
With enrollment of 450, the high school is fully accredited by the Korean ministry of education and the students become air force technical sergeants upon graduation. The school curriculum includes subjects in air force maintenance, administration, and civil engineering. In March 2008, 15 female students were enrolled for the first time in school history.

== Technical Schools ==
=== Air Defense Artillery School ===
The school offers training in ADA. Courses are on operation and maintenance and doctrine development. The number of courses totals to 33 with annual enrollment of 1,800.

=== Technical School ===
The mission is to train technicians for the air force. The courses are on weapons and maintenance, logistics and civil engineering with 130 courses being offered. Enrollment is to 1,100.

=== Information and Communications School ===
Teach information and communication fields info/comm/computer methodology and air traffic control. Sixty-two (62) courses enroll about 3,200 annually.

== Air Force Reserve Officer Training Corps ==
The mission is to train ROTC officers. The courses are on officer basics and provide basic military training. 140 enrolled annually.

== 27th Reserve Group ==
The mission is to provide wartime/peacetime mobilization training. Provides job related training such as marksmanship and road march. Enroll about 3,500 annually.

== Foreign Language Institute ==
The institute provides English language training to air force officers and non-commissioned officers.
