= Officer candidate school =

Type of military school

An officer candidate school (OCS) is a military school which trains civilians and enlisted personnel in order for them to gain a commission as officers in the armed forces of a country. How OCS is run differs between countries and services. Typically, officer candidates have already attained post-secondary education, and sometimes a bachelor's degree, and undergo a short duration of training (not more than a year) which focuses primarily on military skills and leadership. This is in contrast with a military academy which includes academic instruction leading to a bachelor's degree.

== Australia ==
Officer Cadet School of Australia – Portsea (OCS Portsea) commenced training officers for the Australian Army in 1951 and continued through to the end of 1985. Since OCS Portsea's closure in 1985, all Australian Army Officer training has been conducted at the Royal Military College, Duntroon, in Canberra. During the Vietnam War, the Officer Training Unit, Scheyville was used to train and commission National Servicemen as 2nd Lieutenants between 1965 and 1972.

== France ==
In France, training for officers is at:

- École polytechnique, École spéciale militaire de Saint-Cyr, École militaire des aspirants de Coëtquidan, École des officiers de la gendarmerie nationale, École navale, École de l'air, École militaire interarmes, École militaire supérieure d'administration et de management and École de santé des armées

== Germany ==
In Germany, training for officers is at:

- Offizierschule des Heeres in Dresden
- Offizierschule der Luftwaffe at Fürstenfeldbruck Air Base in Fürstenfeldbruck near Munich
- Mürwik Naval School in Flensburg

== Myanmar ==
In Myanmar, the primary officer training school is Officers Training School, Bahtoo.

== Philippines ==
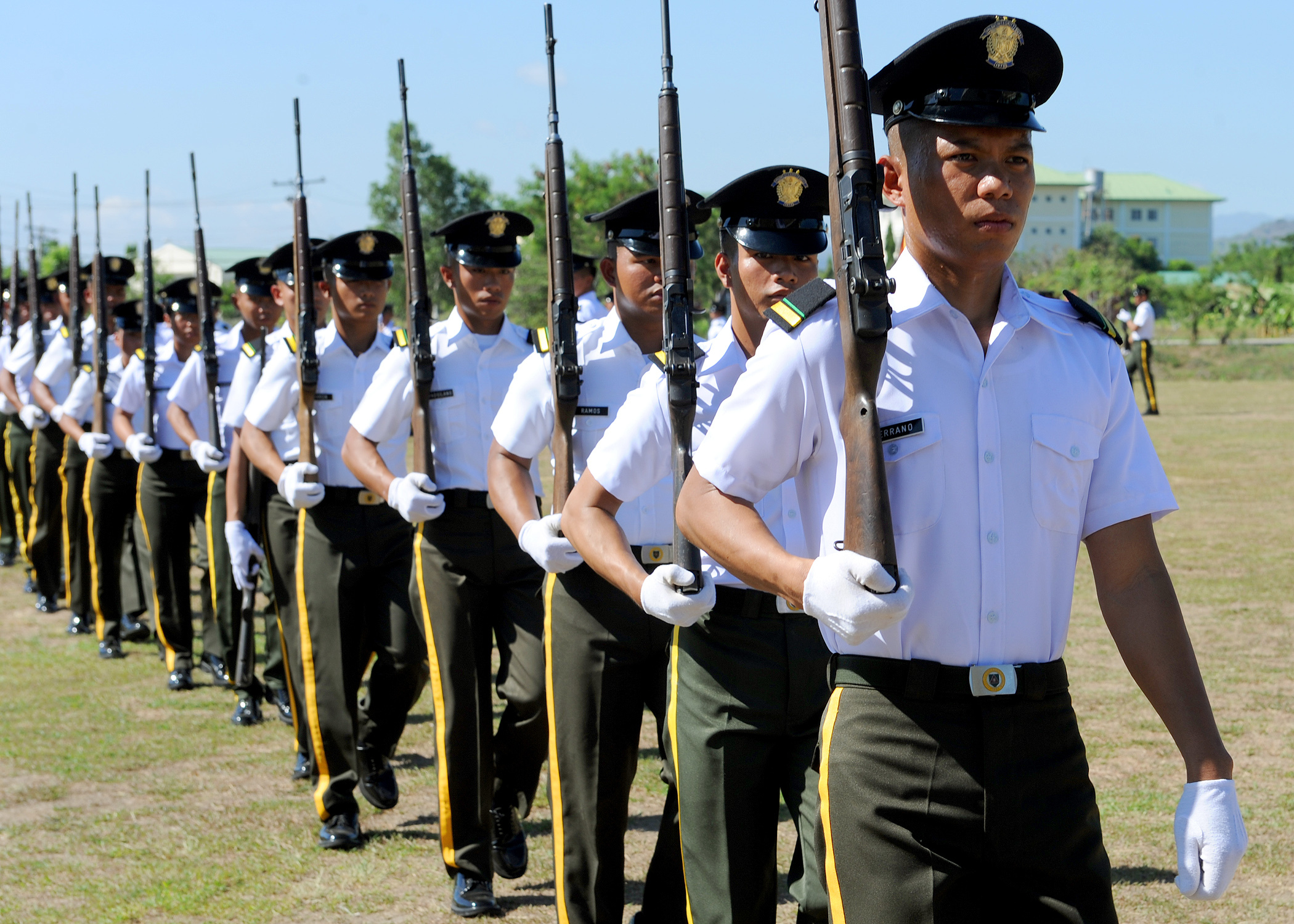
Philippine Army officer candidates march on the parade grounds during Balikatan 2013 at Camp O'Donnell, Philippines, April 6, 2013.

In the Philippines, the Armed Forces of the Philippines Officer Candidate School was originally formed out from the defunct School for Reserve Commission (SRC), which was established in the 1930s pursuant to the provisions of then Philippine Commonwealth Act Number 1, otherwise known as "The National Defense Act of the Philippines". This was created in preparation for the defense of the Philippines, establishing a 10-year program of training for Filipino Servicemen and Civilian Volunteers (Reserve), and forming the Philippine Army as the main ground forces of the Armed Forces of the Philippines. A transfiguration took place with some military personnel from the Philippine Constabulary being transferred to form the nucleus of the Philippine Army. However, the 10-year program was incomplete by the time World War II broke out in the Pacific and ROSS training was subsequently stopped. Nevertheless, many of its trainees were called to active duty to serve throughout the war mainly with the U.S. Army Forces in the Far East (USAFFE).

The need for commissioned officers after the U.S. liberation of the Philippines in the 1940s prompted the establishment of the School for Reserve Commission, which later became the Officer Candidate School. Early training was held at Camp Tinio, Bangad, Cabanatuan City, Nueva Ecija, Nichols Air Base in Pasay and Fort Bonifacio in Metro Manila. Some graduates of these classes were sent to conflicts in both Korea and Vietnam. Later, the OCS training location was moved to Camp Capinpin, Tanay, Rizal from where 27 classes graduated between 1987 and 2005. Officer candidates with the rank of probationary second lieutenant and probationary ensign have to undergo and pass the 12-month officer candidate course before they can be commissioned as regular and reserve officers in the Philippine Army, the Philippine Constabulary, the Philippine Air Force, the Philippine Navy and the Technical Service (Medical Administrative Corps and Women's Auxiliary Corps).

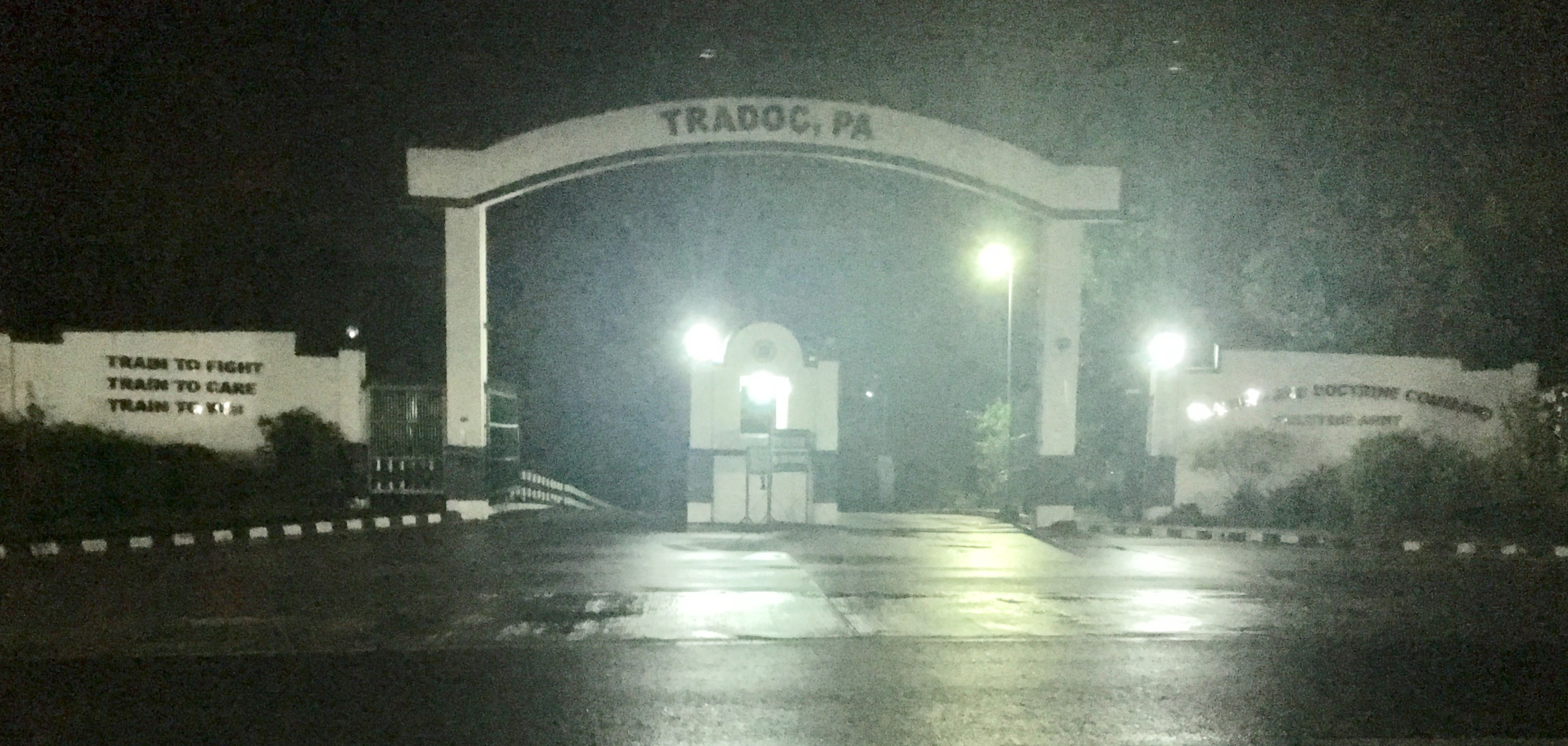
Training and Doctrine Command (TRADOC), Philippine Army located at Brgy. Sta. Lucia, Capas, Tarlac, Philippines

In 1993, OCS started accepting two foreign officer candidates from the Royal Brunei Armed Forces who joined the officer candidate course "Balikatan" Class 12-94. In 1994, five female OCs belonging to AFPOCS "Balikatan" Class 12-94 graduated to become the first female officers of the AFP and were no longer included as Women's Auxiliary Corps officers. Some Filipino officer candidates were also sent to train in Australia, New Zealand, Singapore and the United Kingdom. Today, each of the three armed services of the Armed Forces of the Philippines (AFP) – Army, Air Force and Navy – run their own officer training in separate locations such as Philippine Air Force Aviation OCS in Fernando Air Base, Pampanga; Philippine Army OCS in Camp O'Donnell, Capas, Tarlac; and Philippine Navy OCS in San Antonio, Zambales.

== Singapore ==
In Singapore, Officer Cadet School (OCS) is a school within SAFTI Military Institute, which serves as the main center for training officers of all ranks. OCS is a quad-service institution which trains officers of the Army, Air Force, Digital and Intelligence Service, and Navy. Unlike other countries, OCS is the only route to a commission in the SAF. Even selected cadets who hold scholarships to train in friendly service academies must complete two thirds of OCS and receive their commission before undergoing further training overseas.

OCS in Singapore lasts approximately 38 weeks. The first term consists of military knowledge applicable to all services, including military history and military law. Subsequently, Officer Cadets are streamed into their services based on aptitude and personal preference, and receive training specific to their service.

== South Korea ==
In South Korea, Officer Candidate School (학사사관) was modeled on OCS programs of the United States Armed Forces. Qualified persons may earn a commission by passing rigorous basic combat training lasting three to four months.

The Republic of Korea Army has the highest number of officer candidates each year. All applicants must hold bachelor's degree, unless they are currently non-commissioned officers in active duty, or hold specialized certifications or licenses, such as doctors and attorneys. Most applicants will take a written exam, physical tests, and several interviews for consideration. Admitted applicants are ordered enlistment in the Army Cadet Military School in Goesan. At graduation, candidates earn a commission with the rank of second lieutenant.

The Republic of Korea Navy and the Republic of Korea Marine Corps have maintained the most rigorous candidate school program in South Korea. Both ROKN and ROKMC officer candidates earn commissions together at Republic of Korea Naval Academy in Changwon, while their training programs are distinct. ROKMC candidates will be sent to Marine Corps School in Pohang, while ROKN candidates remain in Changwon. Petty officers in active duty who have earned the bachelor's degree may also apply to the OCS program.

The Republic of Korea Air Force's Officer Training School (OTS) is a popular and competitive officer training program in South Korea. ROKAF OTS trains the majority of its candidates for air defense forces and military police. While OTS also trains pilots, the majority of ROKAF pilots come from the Air Force Academy or ROKAF ROTC programs.

== United Kingdom ==
Initial officer training (IOT) for commissioned officers in the British Armed Forces is undertaken at one of three military academies in the United Kingdom, specific to service branch.

For the British Army, since 1972 IOT has been undertaken at the Royal Military Academy Sandhurst (RMA Sandhurst, or RMAS), commonly known merely as Sandhurst, located in the town of Camberley, near the village of Sandhurst, Berkshire, England, about 34 miles (55 kilometres) south-west of London. The stated aim of RMAS is to be "the national centre of excellence for leadership". All British Army officers, including late-entry officers who were previously warrant officers, as well as many other men and women from overseas militaries, are trained at Sandhurst. The standard duration of training for regular officers at Sandhurst is 44 weeks. Before 1972, many officers were trained at the Mons Officer Cadet School, in a five or six month course, while the course at Sandhurst took two years and was for career officers.

For the Royal Navy (RN), its IOT is undertaken at the Britannia Royal Naval College (Britannia RNC, or BRNC), also known as HMS Dartmouth (a stone frigate), at Dartmouth in Devon, whilst IOT for the Royal Marines (RM) is carried out at the Commando Training Centre Royal Marines (CTCRM). For Royal Air Force (RAF) IOT, that is undertaken the Royal Air Force College Cranwell (RAFC Cranwell, or RAFC), located within the RAF Cranwell airbase. In a similar vein to Sandhurst, Dartmouth and Cranwell also train future officers of many different foreign and Commonwealth militaries. The Royal Navy commissioning course at Dartmouth is 30 weeks, whilst the Royal Marines course lasts 15 months and is split between CTCRM and BRNC. Royal Air Force officer cadets undergo a 24 week course at RAFC.

Once graduated and commissioned, officers of all services are likely to be given further specialist post-graduate training appropriate to their military profession, such as flying training, engineering, or logistics; and these will invariably now be at multi-service training establishments. military chaplains for all service branches received their military theology training at Amport House until it closed in 2020, and the course is now at the Armed Forces Chaplaincy Centre at Beckett Hall, Shrivenham.

== United States ==
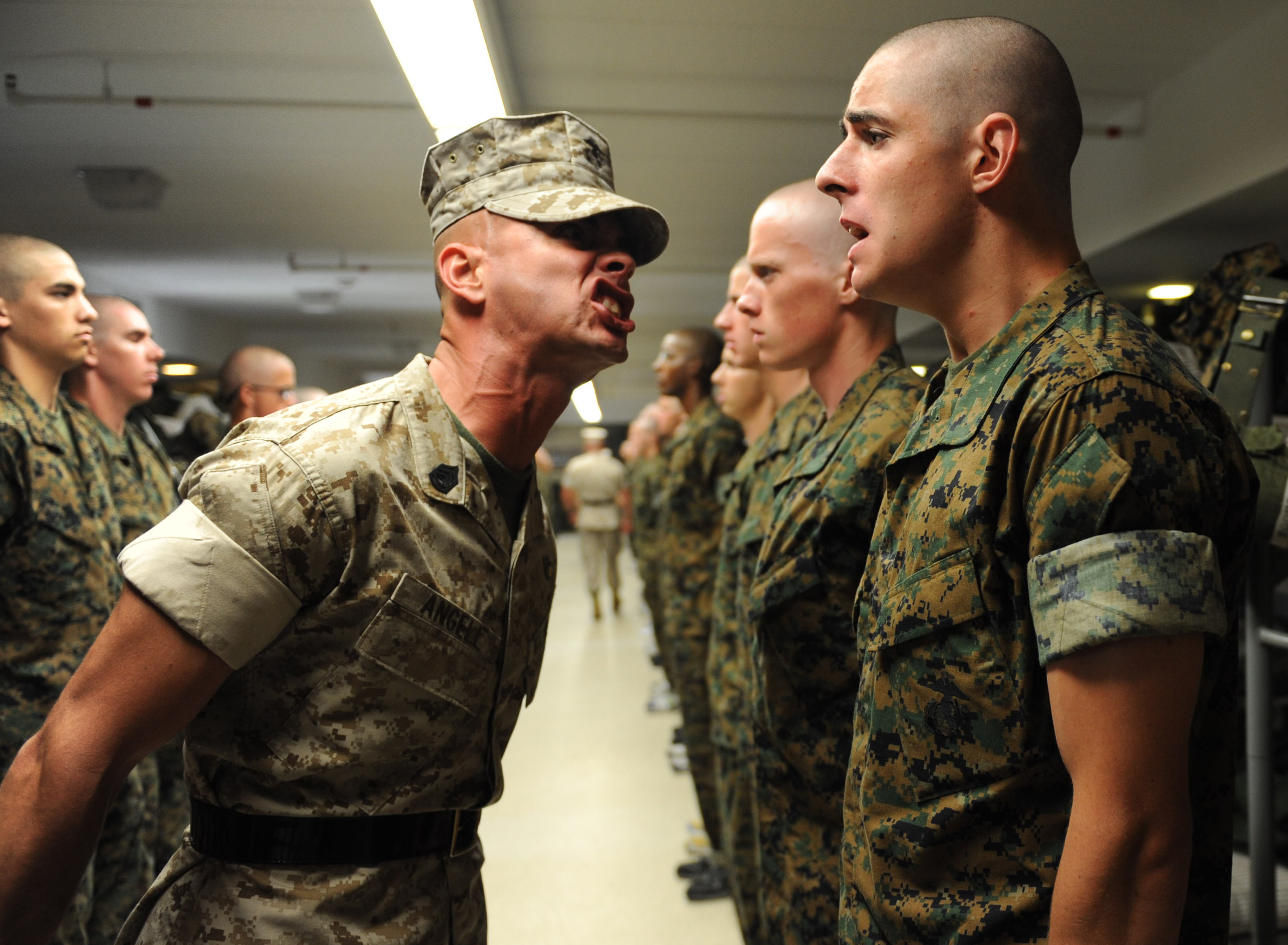
A sergeant instructor disciplines an officer candidate.

In the United States Armed Forces, Officer Candidate School (OCS) or the equivalent is a training program for college graduates and non-commissioned officers, soldiers, sailors, marines, airmen and coast guardsmen to earn commissions as officers. The courses generally last from six to 17 weeks and include classroom instruction in military subjects, physical training, and leadership.

People may earn a commission in the United States Armed Forces through OCS or OTS, by staff appointment, through Reserve Officers Training Corps (ROTC), or through one of the five federal service academies.

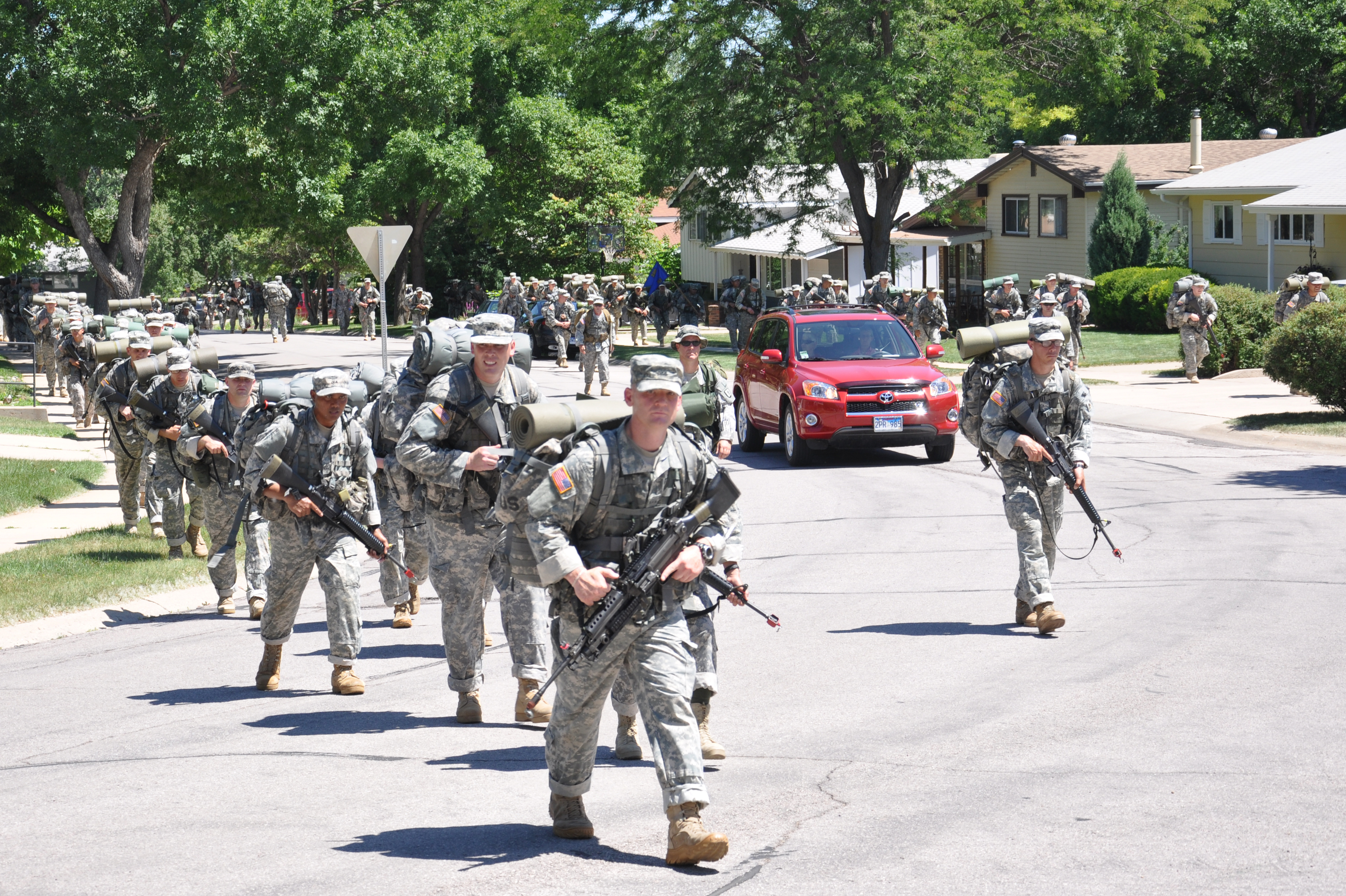
Army National Guard officer candidates, 2011

- The Officer Candidate School of the United States Army is a 12-week-long program held at Fort Benning, Georgia for both prior service and non-prior service candidates. The Army is the only U.S. branch in which those with no prior military service must first attend Basic Combat Training. There are also Army National Guard Officer Candidate Schools that allow an Army National Guard soldier to train within the "one weekend a month, two weeks a year" training program; this is called "Traditional", as it is the original method for the Army National Guard, and takes 18 months to complete. In addition, Army National Guard soldiers have the option to attend the federal course or to attend a 7-day-per-week accelerated eight-week program in conjunction with other states. Both federal and state programs are accredited by the U.S. Army Infantry School. Upon completion of either OCS programs, graduates are commissioned as Second Lieutenants (2LT) and then attend the rest of their Basic Officer Leadership courses. In 2006, the officer commissioning programs changed, making the entire process, "Basic Officer Leadership Course", occurring in two phases (BOLC-A and BOLC-B). Phase A is the original commissioning source (OCS, ROTC, USMA, Direct). BOLC B is the Officer Basic Course which trains the new officers into their Basic Branch skills and includes three weeks of basic soldiering skills.
- The Officer Candidates School of the United States Marine Corps is at Marine Corps Base Quantico, Virginia. All Marine officers are initially trained at OCS, with the exception of those who come from the United States Naval Academy. Entrance to OCS is obtained through the Platoon Leaders Class and Officer Candidates Course programs. Candidates who enter the Platoon Leaders Class attend either two six-week sessions or one ten-week session during college. Those who enter the Officer Candidates Course attend one ten-week session after graduation from college. Naval ROTC midshipmen in the Marine Option also attend for one six-week session prior to commissioning. Graduates are commissioned as Second Lieutenants (2ndLt) in the U.S. Marine Corps. Regardless of commissioning source, all Marine Corps officers attend The Basic School (TBS) prior to beginning training for their Military Occupational Specialty (MOS).
- The Officer Candidate School of the United States Navy is a 13-week course located at Naval Station Newport, Rhode Island. It has been based there since the fall of 2007 after relocating from NAS Pensacola, Florida. In the 1990s, OCS had departed Newport to combine with Aviation Officer Candidate School (AOCS) at Naval Air Station Pensacola. On its return, it brought the tradition of USMC drill instructors (a la An Officer and a Gentleman) from NAS Pensacola. Upon completion, graduates are commissioned in the rank of ensign (ENS) in the U.S. Navy.
- The Officer Training School of the United States Air Force and Space Force is located at Maxwell Air Force Base, Alabama. There are three programs offered at OTS. The first is Basic Officer Training (BOT), for those seeking a commission to the active duty USAF. It is a 9-week-long program consisting of two parts. In the first part, officer trainees learn military skills, USAF history, and other classroom and skill courses needed for serving in the Air Force. In the second part, they are given ranks from Officer Trainee O-1 (2d Lt) to Officer Trainee O-6 (Col), and learn how to be a leader, including the opportunity to lead other Officer Trainees. Graduates are commissioned as Second Lieutenants (2d Lt) in the U.S. Air Force. The second program is Commissioned Officer Training (COT), a five-week introductory program to the USAF for those who have been directly commissioned in the USAF, primarily as chaplains, doctors, and lawyers. Trainees in COT range in rank from O-1 to O-5 and will report directly to their respective units after training. The third program is the Academy of Military Science (AMS), a detachment of the Air National Guard Readiness Center that is embedded at OTS. AMS is a six-week program designed to train and commission officer candidates to fulfill USAF and Air National Guard (ANG) requirements. The AMS program covers the same subject areas as BOT and COT, but also provides education in ANG heritage and the role of the "Citizen Airman". The majority of AMS students are prior-enlisted and many may also have civilian careers. Once AMS candidates successfully complete all OTS graduation requirements, they receive the oath of office and receive state and federal commissions as second lieutenants in the ANG with both state and federal responsibilities.
- The Officer Candidate School of the United States Coast Guard is at the U.S. Coast Guard Academy in New London, Connecticut, where it has been located since August 1998. Prior to August 1998, Coast Guard OCS was located at the Coast Guard Reserve Training Center (RESTRACEN) in Yorktown, Virginia. OCS is a 12-week-long program. Graduates are commissioned in the rank of ensign (ENS) in the U.S. Coast Guard and may report to Coast Guard cutters, sectors, or directly to flight training.
- Officer Candidate Schools are also maintained by the active State Defense Forces of the United States by direction of their respective state military departments and by the state's National Guard Adjutant General. Similar to their state's National Guard counterparts who take a dual federal and state military commission, military officers who are commissioned through a SDF Officer Candidate School take a sole military commission to the state that they support, recognized by their state's military code and 32 U.S.C. § 109. In states with full integration of state military resources (SDF and National Guard counterparts) the curriculum is often similar, with the National Guard curriculum taking on additional requirements to meet federal recognition (referred to as FEDREC). For example, California maintains both Officer Candidate Schools at Camp San Luis Obispo, with the State Guard OCS being 11-12 months and the National Guard OCS being 16-18 months, both celebrate a joint graduation.
- During WWII, the U.S. Army Signal Corps ran an Officer Candidate School located in the war zone labeled as the South West Pacific Area (SWPA), at Camp Columbia, Brisbane, Australia. From photographs taken by the U.S. Army, it is apparent that this course was integrated with the U.S. Army's Signal Corps OCS program at Ft. Monmouth, New Jersey. Contemporary records indicate that the course was branch immaterial – perhaps the first branch immaterial course in the Army. Unfortunately, there is little information about the particulars of how SWPA OCS was operated, such as its length, subject matter content, training routine, etc. In particular, its years of operation and other reliable statistical information are not readily available.

== See also ==
- Officer Candidate School (Indonesian Army)
- State Defense Forces Personnel and Training
