= Republic of Korea Air Force Academy =

South Korean military academy

Coordinates: 36°34′48″N 127°31′34″E

- Motto: We learn and endeavor Devoting our bodies, hearts, and minds To our country and the sky above. (배우고 익혀서 몸과 마음을 조국과 하늘에 바친다)
- Type: Service academy
- Established: 1949; 77 years ago
- Superintendent: Lieutenant General Lee, Sang Hak (June 2022 ~ present)
- Location: Cheongju, Chungbuk, South Korea
- Campus: Air Force base
- Nickname: Seongmudae
- Mascot: Boramae (juvenile Eurasian goshawk)
- Website: www.afa.ac.kr

Korean name
- Hangul: 공군사관학교
- Hanja: 空軍士官學校
- RR: Gonggun sagwan hakgyo
- MR: Konggun sagwan hakkyo

Republic of Korea Air Force Academy (ROKAFA; Korean: 공군사관학교) is a Republic of Korea Air Force institution for the undergraduate education and military training of officers. It is located at Cheongju, Chungbuk, South Korea. The current superintendent of the Academy is Lieutenant General Park, Ha Sik.

== History ==
The Academy was founded as the Aviation Academy (항공사관학교) at Gimpo in 1949, which later in the same year was renamed into its current name. During the Korean War, the Academy was moved to Mosulpo Base, Jeju and again to Jinhae Base, Gyeongnam. The Academy was given its other name Seongmudae in 1966 by then President Park Chung-hee. In 1985 the Academy was moved to its current base in Cheongju.

ROKAFA became the first of the three Korean military academies to allow female cadets to enter in 1997.

== Campus ==
The campus is located in the central part of the country at Cheongju.

== Organization ==
Cadet Wing, Faculty Board and the Base Group are the main divisions along with the Academy Headquarters, Administration Division, and Academic Information Centre.

== Education ==
Cadets of the Academy do not have to pay any tuition but need to serve at least ten years in the Air Force. It has a number of international exchange cadets such as Japan, Turkey, and Thailand. Since no pilot training is included in the curricula, all the graduates who pass the physical test are supposed to enter the pilot training after graduation.

Cadets are required to select his/her major from several available curricula offered including foreign languages, aeronautical engineering, astronautical engineering, international relations, industrial engineering, computer science, mechanical engineering, electronic engineering, management, Military and Strategic Studies.

== See also ==
- Republic of Korea military academies
- Korea Military Academy (ROK Army)
- Republic of Korea Naval Academy (ROK Navy)
- List of national universities in South Korea
- List of universities and colleges in South Korea
- Education in Korea
