= Korea Military Academy =

Leading military academy in South Korea

- 육군사관학교
- Former names: National Defense Academy (1946); Chosun Defense Academy (1946–1948)
- Motto: 지, 인, 용 (Korean)
- Motto in English: Wisdom, Integrity, and Courage
- Type: Service Academy
- Established: May 1, 1946
- Superintendent: LTG Kim Jeong Soo
- Administrative staff: 160 faculty
- Location: Nowon-gu, Seoul, South Korea; 37.624361°N 127.099028°E
- Nickname: Hwarangdae (Korean: 화랑대; Hanja: 花郞臺)
- Mascot: Hwarang-i
- Website: www.kma.ac.kr

Korean name
- Hangul: 육군사관학교
- Hanja: 陸軍士官學校
- RR: Yukgun sagwan hakgyo
- MR: Yukkun sagwan hakkyo

Korea Military Academy (KMA) is the leading South Korean institution for the education and training of officer cadets for the Republic of Korea Army. Along with the Korea Army Academy (Yeongcheon), it produces the largest number of senior officers in the Korean army. Commonly referred to as Hwarangdae (Korean: 화랑대 Hanja: 花郞臺) as a reference to the Hwarang, an elite organization of youth leaders which existed in Korean history, it is located in Nowon-gu, a northeastern district of Seoul, South Korea.

== History ==
The academy was founded on May 1, 1946, as South Joseon Defense Academy by National Defense Command, the predecessor of Ministry of National Defense of Republic of Korea, under the authority of then-U.S. military administration in South Korea. With the end of the Pacific War and the subsequent disbandment of the Imperial Japanese Army, which had been occupying Korea since 1910, a void of indigenous security force was created, while the pool of human resource was composed of various backgrounds, including the former Imperial Japanese Army, Manchurian Army, and Korean Liberation Army. As a preparatory measure, the U.S. military administration opened the Military Language School in Seoul on December 5, 1945, in order to train military interpreters as well as the new generation of commissioned officers with unified, predominantly American military doctrine.

In January 1946, the South Joseon National Defense Force was established. It was the predecessor to the ROK army. The School closed down on April 30, and South Joseon Defense Academy was founded the next day, taking over 60 cadets from the school and augmented by 28 new officer candidates drafted from line units. Henceforth, May 1 has been recognized as the official foundation day of KMA. Cham-ryeong (current rank of major) Lee Hyung-geun was appointed as the first superintendent of the academy, and Bu-wi (current rank of first lieutenant) Jang Chang-kuk was appointed as the commandant. Following the establishment of the South Korean government on August 15, 1948, the National Defense Force was renamed to 'Republic of Korea Army', and so was South Joseon Defense Academy to 'Korea Military Academy' accordingly.

=== Reorganization during the Korean War ===
From the beginning of the Korean War, ROK President Syngman Rhee had asked US General Walton Walker and Walker's successor Matthew Ridgway for help reestablishing the KMA, but both generals found it impractical.

In 1951, Ridgway's successor General James Van Fleet finally listened to Rhee's request. Van Fleet was a graduate of West Point and had previously been in Greece during the 1946 – 1949 Greek Civil War, where he had reorganized the US-backed Kingdom of Greece army. He took inspiration from his experiences, and said he wished to do for South Korea "the same as we did for the Greek divisions".

In October 1951, the ROK Army Chief of Staff proposed an academy with a four-year course modeled after West Point. They created a temporary site for this school at Jinhae-gu, and appointed three West Point graduates to oversee the program. They held an opening ceremony on 20 January 1952. (Note: Na source has a typo; says opening ceremony was 1951, but it should be 1952 according to the source Na cites) The KMA was very popular among South Koreans, with ROK Army Chief of Staff Lee Jong-chan writing:

The Korean Military Academy is the hope of our people … We are also assured of our contribution to the new institution by firmly establishing an honourable and respectable tradition like that of your Military Academy in America

— Lieutenant General Lee Chongchan, Chief of Staff, ROK Army, to General J. Lawton Collins, Chief of Staff, US Army, 5 February 1952, RG 319, Army Intelligence Project Decimal Files, 1951–52, Box 164, NA.

A statue of Van Fleet was erected on the KMA campus on 31 March 1960 to honor his contributions towards the academy. The Korean Defense Ministry called Van Fleet the "father of the Korean Army" in 2015 for his contributions to the KMA and elsewhere.

=== Modern history ===
As of 2020, the campus had three monuments to honor 1948, 1949, and 1950 graduates of West Point who died in the Korean War. Van Fleet's son, James Van Fleet Jr., was honored in the 18 September 2020 monument, as he had died during a bombing mission in Haeju in April 1952. The ROK Army planned to erect four more monuments for the classes of 1945, 1946, 1947, and 1951 by 2023.

== Campus ==
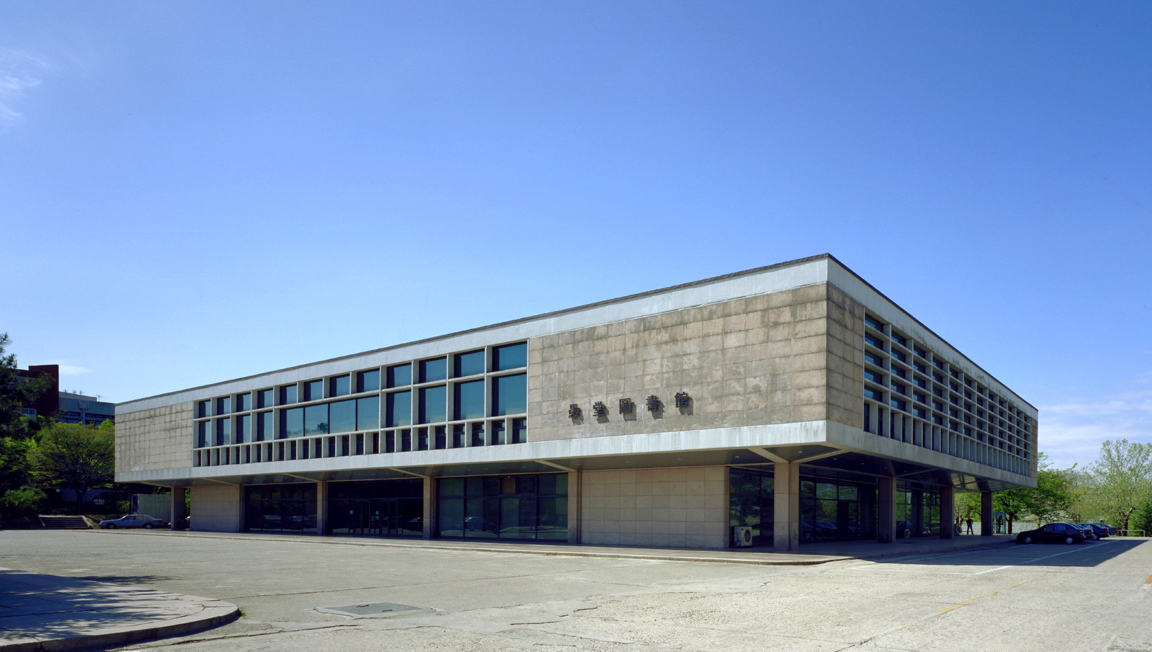
KMA Library

The campus is located in Gongreung 2-dong, Nowon-gu, Seoul, Republic of Korea.

== Dress uniform ==
The Corps of Cadets KMA wear a dark blue full dress uniform with a shako on parades - a mix of the United States tradition infused in the early years combined with the Korean traditional uniform used by the army in the Imperial period. The hackle carried with the shako is gold.

== See also ==
- Republic of Korea military academies
- Korea Air Force Academy
- Korea Naval Academy
- Korea Army Officer Candidate School
- List of national universities in South Korea
- List of universities and colleges in South Korea
- Education in Korea
