= Korea Army Officer Candidate School =

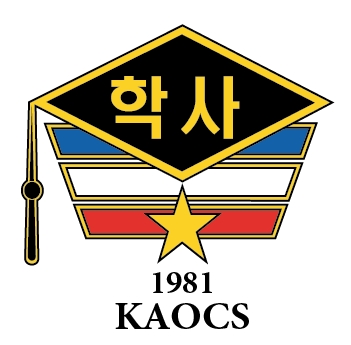
- The original Korea Army Officer Candidate School logo.
- Active: 1981–present
- Country: South Korea
- Branch: Republic of Korea Army
- Type: Training
- Role: Train and commission Army Officers
- March: Haksa-ga (KAOCS Hymn)
- Mascot: Eagle

Korea Army Officer Candidate School (KAOCS, Korean: 육군 학사사관후보생; Hanja: 陸軍 學士士官候補生) provides training to become a commissioned officer in the Republic of Korea Army. Korea Army Officer Candidate School was first proposed on 28 June 1981. Between 1981 and 2024, over 53,273 candidates were enrolled in 69 KAOCS classes and were commissioned as Second Lieutenants.

== History ==
On 28 June 1981, the Republic of Korea Army established the Korea Army Officer Candidate School at Army Infantry School, Gwangju, Korea. In September 1981, the first Infantry KAOCS class graduated 632 second lieutenants. Beginning with the second class in 1982, KAOCS had been trained at Korea Third Military Academy(now Korea Army Academy at Yeongcheon) due to the closing of cadet course in Korea Third Military Academy. From 2012, KAOCS have training at Army Cadet Military School, Goesan, Korea. Between 1981 and 2024, over 53,273 candidates were enrolled in 69 KAOCS classes and were commissioned as Second Lieutenants.

== Qualification requirements ==
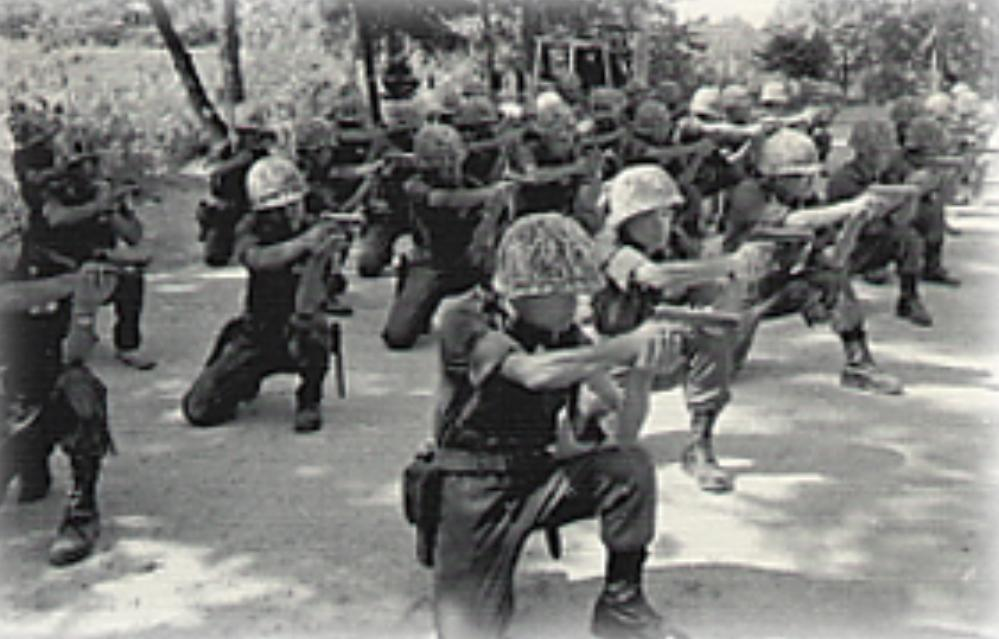
The first class of KAOCS in 1981

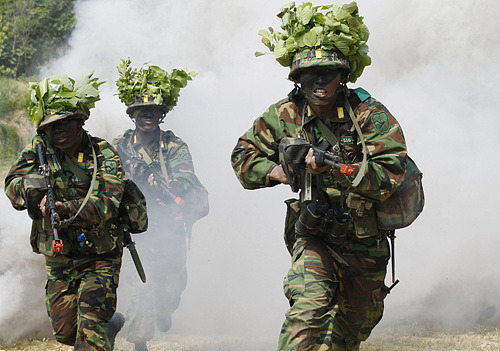
Modern KAOCS

A candidate of KAOCS must:

- Be of good moral character
- Be a citizen of the Republic of Korea
- Be a civilian college graduates
- Less than 27 years old at time of commissioning
- Be physically able to participate in the program of instruction

Applicants to the KAOCS go through a screening process; a written exam, an interview and health examination, and a background check. The applicant must agree to accept a commission and serve in the Republic of Korea Army on active duty.

== Training ==
=== Training ===
Excluding the first week of orientation, KAOCS is a 16-week-long program for college graduates pursuing a commission in the Republic of Korea Army. KAOCS is programmed to teach basic leadership and Soldier tasks, using the Infantry battle drills found in Army Field Manual. The first five weeks of training are geared toward indoctrination. The focus is on physical training, drill and ceremonies, and standardization. The last 11 weeks of training are geared toward officership. The training consists of military history, leadership, field exercises, drill and ceremonies, and small arms training. Trainees are given ranks of officer candidate.

- Orientation (1 week)
  - Military custom and courtesies
- Basic training (5 weeks)
  - Physical training, drill and ceremonies, and standardization
- Training for officership (11 weeks)
  - Military history, leadership, field exercises, drill and ceremonies, and small arms training

=== Commission ===
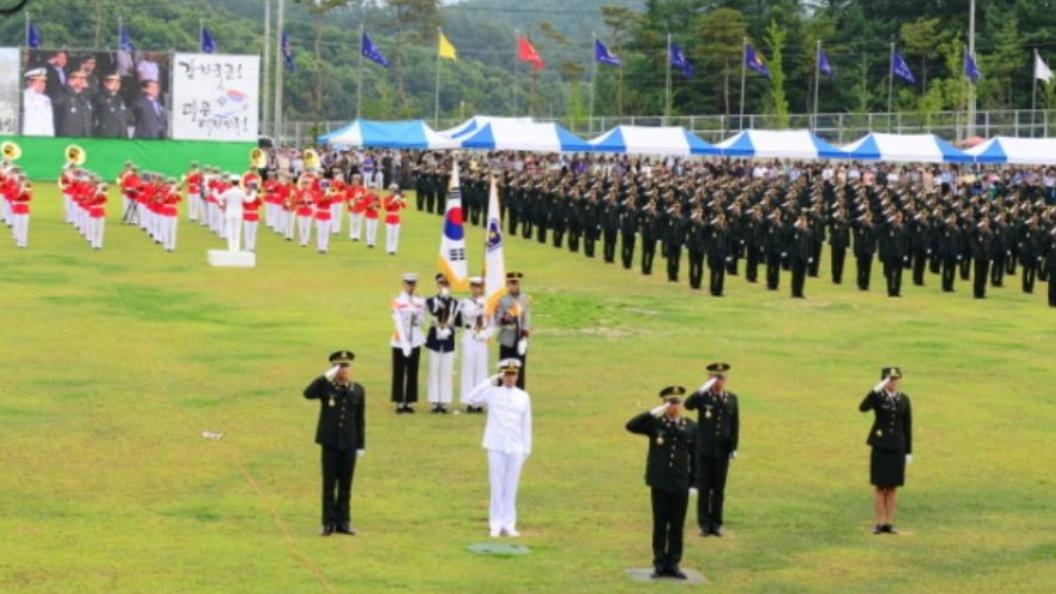
Newly graduated and commissioned officers

Upon completion of KAOCS program, graduates are commissioned as Second Lieutenants (2LT) and then attend the rest of their Officer Basic Course (OBC) which trains the new officers into their Basic Branch skills. After commissioning, they serve for three years. However individuals may choose to extend their service past the required period in pursuit of an active military career.

=== Promotion ===
Between 1981 and 2024, over 53,273 candidates were enrolled in 69 KAOCS classes and were commissioned as Second Lieutenants. Now, 24 general officers, about 3,000 senior officers, and 10,000 Junior officers serve in the Republic of Korea Army. Brigadier General Hyun-suk Jeong (3rd class), Brigadier General Sang-yun Lee (6th class), Brigadier General Hyang-hyeok Bang (5th class), Brigadier General U-gyo Jeong (6th class), and Brigadier General Yong-moon Cho (5th class) are very famous.

== Notable graduates ==
- Members of Congress
  - Jong-bae Lee (1st class)
  - Seok-jun Song (12th class)
  - Jun-byong Yun (4th class)
  - Bu-nam yang (4th class)
  - Sun-young Kang (9th class)
  - Jae-kwan Lee (11th class)
- Former Member of Congress
  - Sung-jung Park (1st class)
  - Dong-wan Kim (1st class)
  - Byung-hun Jeon (1st class)
  - Heui-kuk Kim (2nd class)
- Governors
  - Jeong-bok Ryu (1st class)(Mayor of Incheon)
  - Heon-yul Jung (2nd class)(Mayer of Iksan)
  - Sung Lee (1st class)(Director General of Kuro Ward, Seoul)
  - Sung-il Park (1st class)(Governor of Wanju-gun)
  - Kwang-sil Bae (4th class)( Director General of Buk Ward, Daegu)
- University Professors
  - Bon-chung Ku (1st class)(President, Chungyang Univ.)
  - Dong-il Rho (1st class)(Prof., Kyunghee Univ.)
  - Dae-jeong Kim (1st class)(Prof., Chungang Univ.)
  - Min-cheol Choi (1st class)(Prof., Seoul National Univ.)
  - Yeon-ju Jeong (1st class)(Prof., Sungshin Women's Univ.)
  - Ho-geun Kong (1st class)(Prof., Keukdong Univ.)
  - Chun-han Yun (1st class)( Prof., Chosun Univ.)
  - Il-su Kim (1st class)( Prof., Mokpo Univ.)
  - Uel-hyung Lee (7th class)( Colonel, Prof., Korea Army Academy at Yeongcheon)
  - Lewis Hyukseung Lee (38th class)(Assistant Prof., Univ. of Alabama, United States)
- General officers
  - Lieutenant General Jin-kyu Choi(7nd class)
  - Lieutenant General Yeong-min So (8th class)
  - Major General Sun-young Kang (9th class)
  - Major General Sung-jae Park (12th class)
  - Major General Su-deuk Lee (16th class)
  - Brigadier General Hyun-suk Jeong (3rd class)
  - Brigadier General Sang-yun Lee (6th class)
  - Brigadier General Hyang-hyeok Bang (5th class)
  - Brigadier General U-gyo Jeong (6th class)
  - Brigadier General Yong-moon Cho (5th class)

== See also ==
- Officer Training School ROKAF
- Korea Military Academy
- Korea Army Academy at Yeongcheon
