= Inje County =

Coordinates: 38°04′N 128°10′E

Inje
- County
- Flag Emblem of Inje

- Location in South Korea
- Country: South Korea
- State: Gangwon
- Administrative divisions: 1 eup, 5 myeon

Area
  - Total: 1,646.33 km^{2} (635.65 sq mi)

Population (September 2024)
  - Total: 31,644
  - Density: 21/km^{2} (54/sq mi)

Korean name
- Hangul: 인제군
- Hanja: 麟蹄郡
- RR: Inje-gun
- MR: Inje-gun

Inje County (Korean: 인제군) is a county in the state of Gangwon, South Korea. It has the lowest population density of any South Korean county. The county seat is Inje-eup, which located near the center of the county.

== History ==
Inje is located in the north of Gangwon Province. Inje County has been called multiple names throughout its history. It was first known as Jeojokhyeon in the Goguryeo Kingdom, then Heejaehyeon in the Silla Kingdom, and Inje in the Goryeo Dynasty. The area was then known as Youngsohyeon and once again later on became Inje in the Joseon Dynasty. It was finally raised to the status of Inje county in August of 1896. At the end of the Japanese occupation of Korea in 1945, Korea was split into 13 distinctive administrative zones, and Inje County was located in Kangwon Province, and for a short time was under the administration of North Korea. After the Partition of Korea, this historical province was split in half and Inje County fell under the jurisdiction of South Korea.

=== Korean War ===
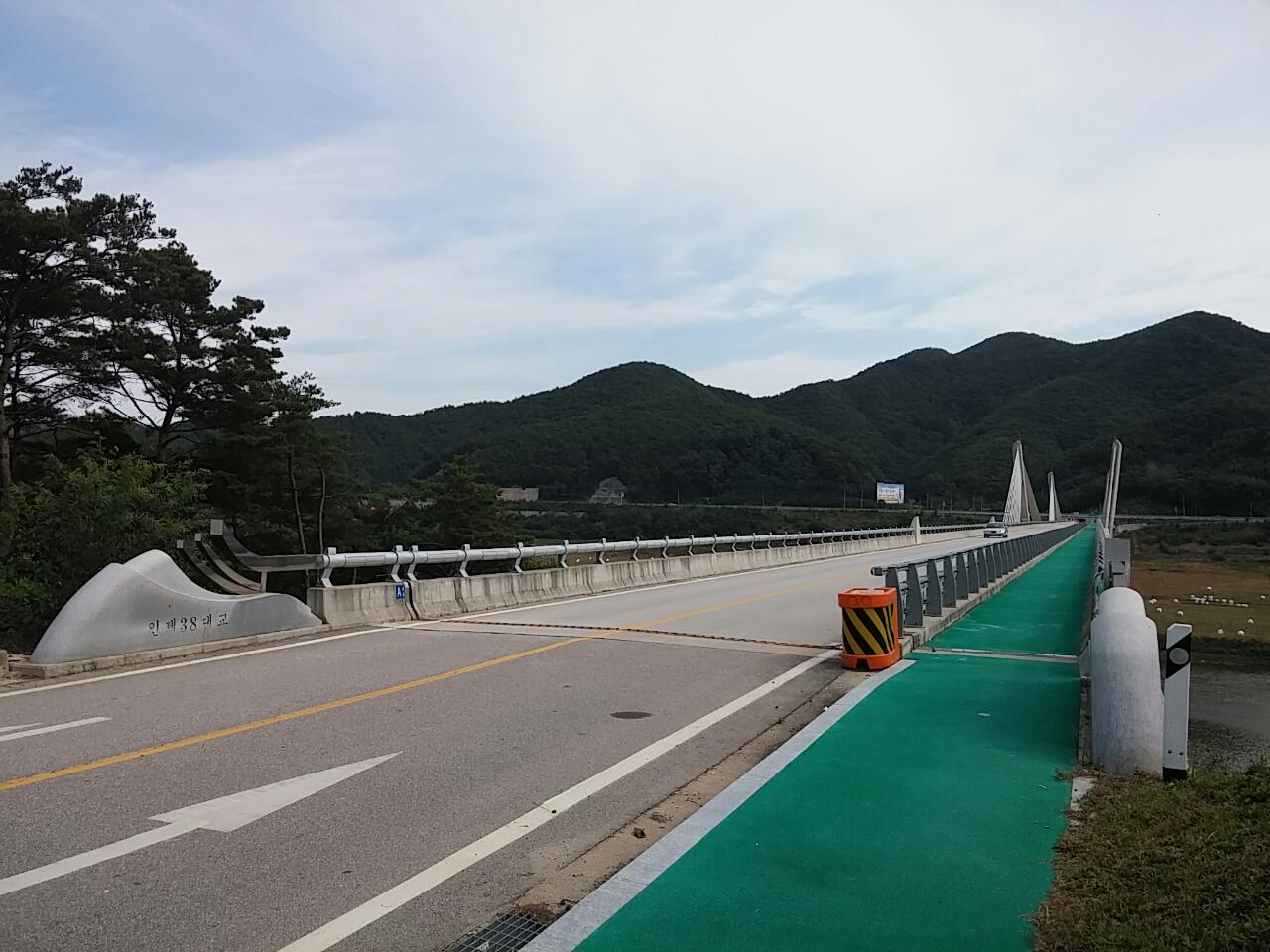
38 Bridge

The Republic of Korea Army (ROK) 5th Infantry Division recaptured Inje town in Operation Rugged in April 1951 as the UN Forces advanced to the Kansas Line, north of the 38th Parallel.

Inje town was lost again to the Chinese People's Volunteer Army during the Fifth Phase Offensive in late April 1951 and was recaptured in the UN May-June 1951 counteroffensive.

In 1951 the US Marine Corps 1st Medical Battalion operated a field hospital in Inje town.

The 40th Infantry Division assumed responsibility for the defense of the Kansas Line from the 24th Infantry Division from February 1952 supported by the ROK 3rd Infantry Division.

After the war ended, Inje County continued to be a strategic location for the military. The Korea Combat Training Center is located there. The Republic of Korea Army's III Corps headquarters and its subordinate units are scattered in bases throughout the county.

== Environment ==
Inje is located in the Taebaek Mountains and has a landscape dominated by flora. Many species inhabit several areas of the county, not only mountains but rivers also.

=== Fauna ===
- Asiatic Black Bear : In Korea, the Asiatic Black Bear can be found in the areas of Paekdusan, Seoraksan, and Jirisan, but it is becoming increasingly rare in South Korea.
- Musk deer : Among the Musk deer in the northern hemisphere, this species in the North-East is divided into seven subspecies. This subspecies found in the mountains around Mokpo and Jeonranamdo is also reported to be distributed Manchuria, Amur, Ussuri and Eastern Siberia as well as South Korea.

=== Flora ===
- Senecio koreanus : The Senecio Koreanus is a Korean Endemic Species.
- Carex chordorhiza : The Carex Chordorhiza is a perennial plant growing with sphagnum in a swamp, at first grows straight and then crawls laterally to take root. From its joint it grows a flower stem of up to 20 cm. Its leaves are flat and 1~1.5 cm wide with colors of gray and green. The heads are egg-like and numbered 2~4 which are 5~7 cm long. Male flowers come out upward but female ones downward without any bracts.
- Megaleranthis saniculifolia : Megaleranthis Saniculifolia is also a Korean Endemic Species and clings to Ranunculaceae. It inhabits the Jeombongsan, Sobaeksan, Jirisan and Taebaeksan areas. Living in the swamps or ridges in deep mountains, the perennial plant sprouts in stubbles. It's between 30 and 40 cm tall. Leaves come from the root of the plant and are divided into three parts at the end, a long leafstalk may be split into two or three parts again.

== Geography ==
Among the basic local governments in Korea, it ranks second in terms of area after Hongcheon. Most of Inje-gun on the 38th parallel belonged to the Democratic People's Republic of Korea; the remaining areas were incorporated into Shinnam-myeon and Naeyeon, Hongcheon-gun. After the Korean War, most of the borders of Gangwon-do went north and became Inje-gun, but the inner side was not restored and remained under the jurisdiction of Hongcheon-gun. There are many famous hills, such as Jinbu-ryeong, Misiryeong, Hangyeryeong, Eunbi-ryeong, and Gom-Bae-ryeong.

== Climate ==
Inje has a monsoon-influenced humid continental climate (Köppen: Dwa) with cold, dry winters and hot, rainy summers.

Climate data for Inje (1991–2020 normals, extremes 1971–present)
Month	Jan	Feb	Mar	Apr	May	Jun	Jul	Aug	Sep	Oct	Nov	Dec	Year
Record high °C (°F)	13.2 (55.8)	18.9 (66.0)	23.5 (74.3)	31.2 (88.2)	33.0 (91.4)	35.4 (95.7)	36.8 (98.2)	37.7 (99.9)	33.2 (91.8)	28.6 (83.5)	24.2 (75.6)	16.3 (61.3)	37.7 (99.9)
Mean daily maximum °C (°F)	1.5 (34.7)	4.7 (40.5)	10.5 (50.9)	17.8 (64.0)	23.2 (73.8)	27.0 (80.6)	28.2 (82.8)	28.8 (83.8)	24.7 (76.5)	19.1 (66.4)	11.0 (51.8)	3.5 (38.3)	16.7 (62.1)
Daily mean °C (°F)	−4.7 (23.5)	−1.8 (28.8)	4.0 (39.2)	10.6 (51.1)	16.1 (61.0)	20.4 (68.7)	23.3 (73.9)	23.4 (74.1)	18.4 (65.1)	11.8 (53.2)	4.8 (40.6)	−2.1 (28.2)	10.4 (50.7)
Mean daily minimum °C (°F)	−10.4 (13.3)	−7.7 (18.1)	−1.9 (28.6)	3.8 (38.8)	9.6 (49.3)	15.1 (59.2)	19.6 (67.3)	19.7 (67.5)	14.0 (57.2)	6.4 (43.5)	−0.4 (31.3)	−7.3 (18.9)	5.0 (41.0)
Record low °C (°F)	−25.9 (−14.6)	−24.5 (−12.1)	−14.9 (5.2)	−7.0 (19.4)	0.1 (32.2)	3.4 (38.1)	9.8 (49.6)	9.0 (48.2)	0.7 (33.3)	−6.5 (20.3)	−14.0 (6.8)	−22.8 (−9.0)	−25.9 (−14.6)
Average precipitation mm (inches)	16.6 (0.65)	22.8 (0.90)	32.1 (1.26)	69.8 (2.75)	92.6 (3.65)	116.8 (4.60)	332.4 (13.09)	287.6 (11.32)	127.4 (5.02)	44.8 (1.76)	40.9 (1.61)	20.8 (0.82)	1,204.6 (47.43)
Average precipitation days (≥ 0.1 mm)	5.9	5.7	7.8	8.7	9.4	10.3	15.2	14.0	8.9	5.8	7.5	5.9	105.1
Average snowy days	9.4	7.4	4.9	0.7	0.0	0.0	0.0	0.0	0.0	0.1	2.1	6.5	30.8
Average relative humidity (%)	65.0	61.1	58.4	56.4	63.7	69.7	78.5	79.0	76.8	72.9	69.0	67.3	68.2
Mean monthly sunshine hours	158.8	158.3	187.5	199.4	215.6	199.2	144.9	159.7	165.0	166.9	136.1	147.1	2,038.5
Percentage possible sunshine	52.5	52.6	51.8	53.6	50.8	46.3	35.3	41.3	47.1	50.5	45.8	49.3	47.8
Source: Korea Meteorological Administration (snow and percent sunshine 1981–2010)

== Daecheong peak ==
Daecheong Peak is the highest peak in the Mt. Seorak ranges and is located near at the boundary of Inje county and Yangyang county with an altitude of 1,708m.

The beautiful snow scenes around Daecheong peak are widely known. Inje county is quite cold from early November, with snow falling around its higher peaks. In 2007, the first heavy snow of the year was recorded as early as 16 November.

== Tourism ==
Inje is a modest tourist destination for outdoor activities. It is home to the highest bungee jump in South Korea. It also host the Inje Speedium Resort Circuit.

== Ice fishing festival ==
Because of its cold climate, many ice-fishing festivals often occur in Inje and the wider Gangwon-do area. However, the ice fishing in Inje is one of the main attractions in winter with 6,000 tourists per weekday and over 10,000 on weekends.
