= Norwegian Cyber Engineering School =

Coordinates: 61°08′55″N 10°23′06″E

The Norwegian Defence Cyber Academy (CISK)
- Cyberingeniørskolen (CISK)
- Motto: Primus inter pares
- Type: Military
- Established: 1994
- Affiliations: Norwegian Defense Force
- Officer in charge: Ranie Elisabeth Tomter
- Location: Lillehammer, Norway
- Language: Norwegian
- Website: https://www.forsvaret.no/

The Norwegian Defence Cyber Academy (formerly the Norwegian Defence School of Engineering) is a defence and military engineering university located in Lillehammer, Norway. The college was established in 1994.

== History ==
The Cyber Engineering School has been continuously evolving since its inception in 1946 and has had many names over the years:

- Signal Corps Vocational School (SBYS) 1946-1953
- Army Vocational School for Signal Technical Officers (HYSSB) 1953-1973
- Army Technical School/Electronics (HTFS/E) 1973-1998
- Army Engineering College/Jørstadmoen (HIS/J) 1998-2006
- Defence Engineering College (FIH) 2006-2018
- Cyber Engineering School (CISK) 2018-

The school is organized as a subunit of the Norwegian Defence University College and educates sergeants and officers with engineering expertise for all branches of the Norwegian Armed Forces: cyber, army, navy, air force, and joint units. When a new intake, or "wing," joins the school, it is assigned to one of the branches. In practice, this means that students wear the uniform of their respective branch, but it does not affect their training or where they end up after graduation. The students beginning their studies in the autumn of 2020 are assigned to the Army.

== Education and Service Obligation ==
The education consists of 3 years of schooling followed by 3 consecutive years of service in the Armed Forces. The service obligation is fulfilled based on the needs of the Armed Forces. The needs are determined based on reported positions from various units within the Armed Forces, and the process is managed by the school staff. Typically, the number of positions is reduced to match the number of graduating students. There is a wide variation in the branches and units reporting needs, but historically, the majority go to the Army, Navy, and Cyber Defence. The graduating class decides how the positions should be allocated, although some units conduct interviews based on specific needs (academic interest and/or physical capacity). If multiple students desire the same duty station, ranking is often used. This means that the student with the best performance gets the position. Thus, one can influence the choice of duty station based on performance during the study period. Admission requirements, in addition to the regular requirements for officer training, include general study competence with specialization in mathematics (R2) and physics (FY1) or equivalent status (e.g., pre-engineering course).

== Academic Divisions ==
The education is conducted within two academic tracks: technical and military sciences. The main focus is on technical subjects.

=== Technical Sciences ===
Information Security Operating Systems Computer Architecture Systems Development Programming Databases Signal Processing Radio Electronics Basic Engineering Sciences (Mathematics, Physics, Chemistry)
