= Multiculturalism =

Coexistence of multiple cultures

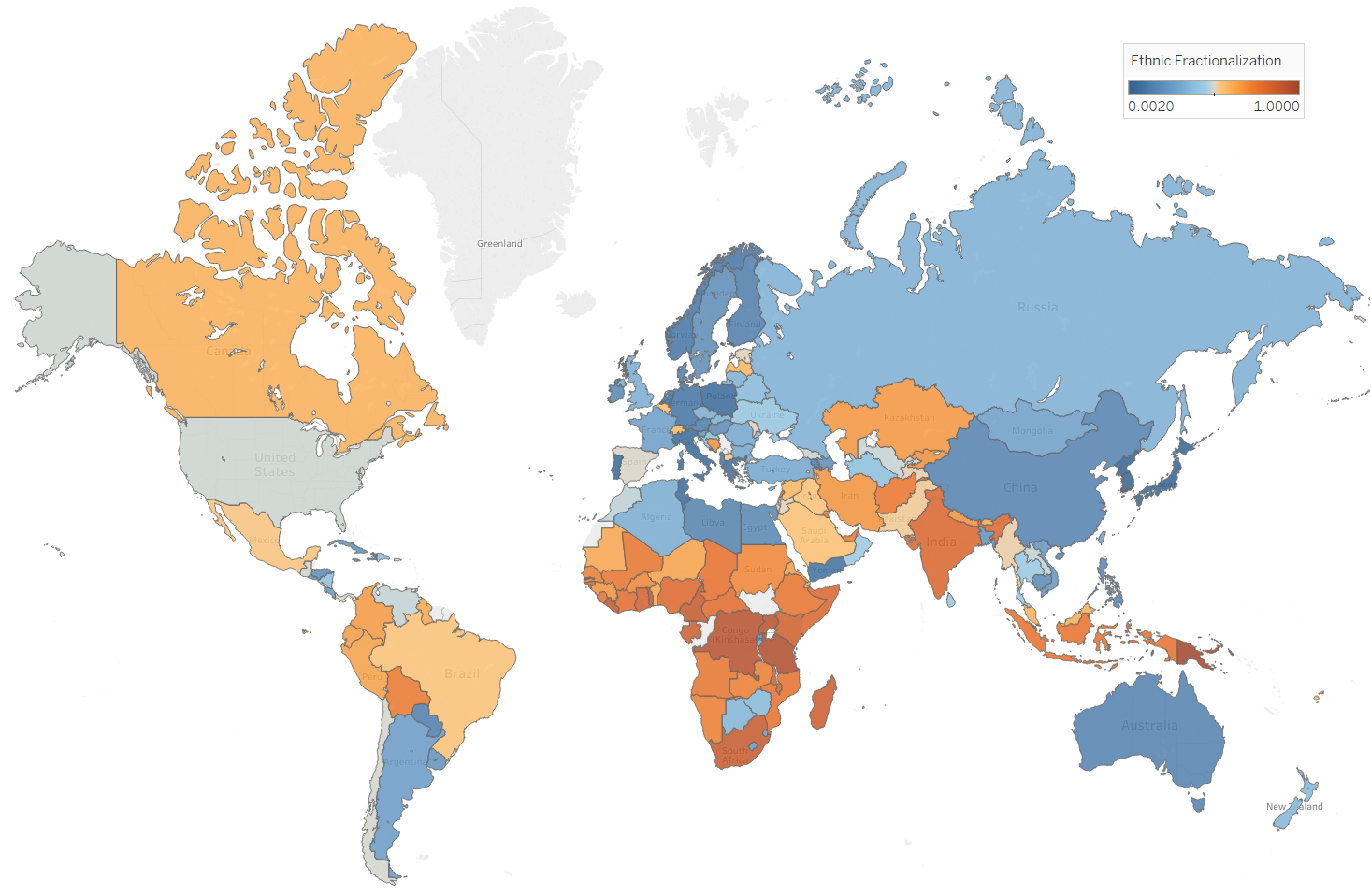
James Fearon's ranking of countries by ethnic and cultural diversity level in 2003, blue is lower and orange is higher.

Multiculturalism is the coexistence of multiple cultures. The word is used in sociology, in political philosophy, and colloquially. In sociology and everyday usage, it is usually a synonym for ethnic or cultural pluralism in which various ethnic and cultural groups exist in a single society. It can describe a mixed ethnic community area where multiple cultural traditions exist or a single country. Groups associated with an indigenous, aboriginal or autochthonous ethnic group and settler-descended ethnic groups are often the focus.

In reference to sociology, multiculturalism is the end-state of either a natural or artificial process, such as legally controlled immigration, and occurs on either a large national scale or on a smaller scale within a nation's communities. On a smaller scale, this can occur artificially when a jurisdiction is established or expanded by amalgamating areas with two or more different cultures (e.g. French Canada and English Canada). On a large scale, it can occur as a result of either legal or illegal migration to and from different jurisdictions around the world.

In reference to political science, multiculturalism can be defined as a state's capacity to effectively and efficiently deal with cultural plurality within its sovereign borders. Multiculturalism as a political philosophy involves ideologies and policies which vary widely. It has been described as a "salad bowl" and as a cultural mosaic, in contrast to a melting pot, or cultural amalgamation.

== History ==
=== Prevalence of multiculturalism over time ===
The Holy Roman Empire during the High Middle Ages. Before the rise of nation-states in the 16th century, local and regional identities in Europe were strong, with each region and town having its own dialect, customs, and traditions.

Ethnographic map of the Austro-Hungarian Empire in 1910.

According to migration researcher Hein de Haas, it is a myth that current societies are more diverse than ever. The idea that 21st century society is in his view exceptionally diverse is based on a distorted image of past societies, in which historical diversity is often overlooked. Historical waves of migration have led to levels of diversity that were at least as great. European countries such as the United Kingdom, France, Germany, and the Netherlands have long-standing diverse societies due to colonial migration, labor migration, and flows of refugees.

Scholars such as Ibrahim Menek suggest that states that embody multicultural ideals have existed since ancient times. The Achaemenid Empire founded by Cyrus the Great followed a policy of incorporating and tolerating various cultures. "Darius, who had an exceptional place in terms of Achaemenid multiculturalism", symbolized 28 conquered communities on his relief. The multicultural relief depicts 28 envoys carrying Darius seated on the throne.

Europe has historically known great diversity in terms of ethnic, linguistic, and religious groups, far outnumbering the number of nation-states. Local and regional identities were strong, with each region and town having its own dialect, customs, and traditions. From the 16th century larger nation states were formed. This process gained momentum after the French Revolution and consolidated in the 19th century.

The Habsburg monarchy, which existed from 1282 to 1918, stood in contrast to the emerging trend of nation-state formation in Europe. It encompassed a mosaic of languages, religions, and regional identities, resisting the centralizing and homogenizing tendencies that characterized nation-state development elsewhere. Issues such as social and cultural differentiation, multilingualism, competing identity offers or multiple cultural identities were already shaping the scientific theories of many thinkers of this multi-ethnic empire.

Especially since the 19th century societies in Europe and North America have become culturally more homogeneous due to the consolidation of the nation-state. Governments promoted national identities through education, conscription, and the standardization of languages. In France, for instance, the promotion of French led to the decline of regional languages such as Breton, Occitan and Catalan. Likewise, in Western Europe, the use of many local dialects decreased. In addition, the rigid religious divides in Western countries softened due to the declining influence of organized religion and the advance of secularization. This pattern repeated itself elsewhere in Europe and North America, where national unification was accompanied by cultural homogenization.

In the 19th century, millions of people from diverse ethnic and religious backgrounds migrated to the United States and Europe, in search of better economic opportunities or to escape persecution. The U.S. was a melting pot of groups such as Irish, Italian, Chinese, German, and Jewish immigrants, who were often initially perceived as threats to the national identity. At the beginning of the 20th century, 14.7% of the U.S. population were immigrants, about the same as at the start of the 21st century.

Nationalism further accelerated cultural homogenization in the 20th century. For example after World War I, much of the former ethnic diversity in the area of the former Habsburg monarchy disappeared. Under the influence of nationalist ideologies, ethnic minorities were disadvantaged, forced to emigrate or even murdered in most regions in the area of the former Habsburg monarchy due to the prevailing nationalism at the time. In many areas, these ethnic mosaics no longer exist in the 21st century. The ethnic mix of that time can only be experienced in a few areas, such as in the former Habsburg port city of Trieste.

Globalization has further reduced cultural differences. The emergence of an increasingly global youth culture in the 1920s, which accelerated significantly from the 1950s onward, made it easier for young people around the world to find shared reference points in food, music, film, literature, and other forms of artistic expression. International travel and the rise of television and the internet promoted the development of both national and international culture. The spread of English as a global language, Hollywood films, and the universal availability of fast-food chains such as McDonald's are all signs of a world becoming increasingly culturally homogeneous. Although urban areas tend to show greater ethnic diversity, the variation between regions and countries has declined, which is often seen as a loss of cultural diversity.

Homogenization is taking place worldwide in the 21st century, with the decline of minority languages a major indicator of this trend. It has been estimated that every two weeks a language ceases to be spoken along with its last speaker.

=== Multiculturalism in modern government policy ===
The term multiculturalism is most often used in reference to Western nation-states, which had seemingly achieved a de facto single national identity during the 18th and/or 19th centuries. Multiculturalism has been official policy in several Western nations since the 1970s, for reasons that varied from country to country, including the fact that many of the great cities of the Western world are increasingly made of a mosaic of cultures.

The Canadian government has often been described as the instigator of multicultural ideology because of its public emphasis on the social importance of immigration. The Canadian Royal Commission on Bilingualism and Biculturalism is often referred to as the origins of modern political awareness of multiculturalism. Canada has provided provisions to the French-speaking majority of Quebec, whereby they function as an autonomous community with special rights to govern the members of their community, as well as establish French as one of the official languages. In the Western English-speaking countries, multiculturalism as an official national policy started in Canada in 1971, followed by Australia in 1973 where it is maintained today. Recently, right-of-center governments in several European Union states – notably the Netherlands and Denmark – have reversed the national policy and returned to an official monoculturalism. A similar reversal is the subject of debate in the United Kingdom, among others, due to evidence of incipient segregation and anxieties over "home-grown" terrorism. Several heads-of-state or heads-of-government have expressed doubts about the success of multicultural policies: The United Kingdom's ex-Prime Minister David Cameron, German Chancellor Angela Merkel, Australia's ex-prime minister John Howard, Spanish ex-prime minister José María Aznar and French ex-president Nicolas Sarkozy have voiced concerns about the effectiveness of their multicultural policies for integrating immigrants.

Many nation-states in Africa, Asia, and the Americas are culturally diverse and are 'multicultural' in a descriptive sense. In some, ethnic communalism is a major political issue. The policies adopted by these states often have parallels with multiculturalist policies in the Western world, but the historical background is different, and the goal may be a mono-cultural or mono-ethnic nation-building – for instance in the Malaysian government's attempt to create a 'Malaysian race' by 2020.

== Impact ==
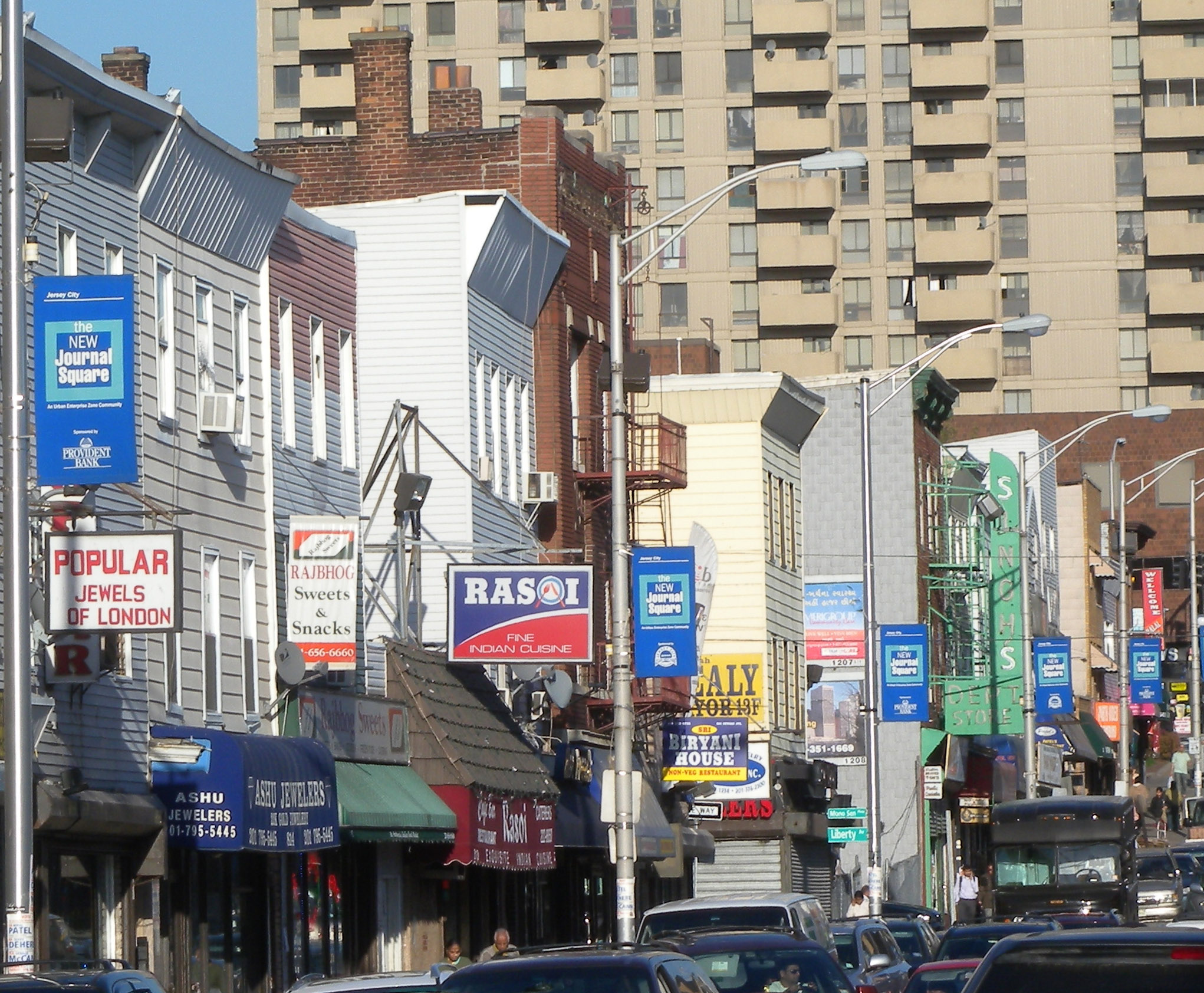
People of Indian origin have been able to achieve a high demographic profile in India Square, Jersey City, New Jersey, US, known as Little Bombay, home to the highest concentration of Indians in the Western Hemisphere and one of at least 24 enclaves characterized as a Little India which have emerged within the New York City Metropolitan Area, with the largest metropolitan Indian population outside Asia, as large-scale immigration from India continues into New York City, through the support of the surrounding community.

According to migration researcher Hein de Haas, research anno 2023 shows that there is no systematic relationship between levels of immigration or ethnic diversity and social cohesion or trust. Studies show that factors such as economic inequality and trust in government are much more important for social cohesion than diversity. In countries and regions where income inequality is low and where people trust their government, social cohesion remains strong even with high levels of diversity. Canada and Australia, for example, are countries with high levels of immigration and diversity, but also with stable and well-functioning societies. On the other hand, hate speech toward minority groups by politicians can reduce social cohesion. So diversity as such does not undermine social cohesion, hate speech by politicians does.

In a study concluded in 2007, Harvard University professor of political science Robert D. Putnam examined the relationship between ethnic diversity and trust using survey data from approximately 30,000 respondents, including samples from 41 communities across the United States. He reported that, in the short to medium term, greater neighbourhood ethnic diversity was associated with lower trust both between ethnic groups and among members of the same ethnic group. Putnam described residents of diverse communities as "hunkering down": withdrawing from collective life and expressing less trust in their neighbours. In his multivariate analysis of trust in neighbours, the association with ethnic diversity remained after controlling for individual and neighbourhood characteristics, including poverty, income inequality, and crime. Putnam says, however, that "in the long run immigration and diversity are likely to have important cultural, economic, fiscal, and developmental benefits." Putnam has also stated, that "this allergy to diversity tends to diminish and to go away... I think in the long run we'll all be better." Putnam denied allegations he was arguing against diversity in society and contended that his paper had been "twisted" to make a case against race-conscious admissions to universities. He asserted that his "extensive research and experience confirm the substantial benefits of diversity, including racial and ethnic diversity, to our society."

In a 2011 study, Patrick Sturgis, Ian Brunton-Smith, Sanna Read, and Nick Allum reconsidered Putnam's "hunkering down" thesis using survey data from nearly 25,000 people in Britain. They argued that Putnam's conclusions do not clearly distinguish between generalized trust in people generally and strategic trust in people known to the respondent, because survey questions used to measure trust do not necessarily capture the same form of trust. They also questioned the substantive importance of Putnam's findings. Although the association reported in Putnam's study was statistically significant, ethnic diversity accounted for less than 0.1 per cent of the variation in trust. In their own analysis, they found no effect of neighbourhood ethnic diversity on generalized trust. Diversity was statistically associated with strategic trust, but the association was substantively trivial and was dwarfed by the effects of economic deprivation and individuals' social contact with their neighbours. The authors therefore concluded that the relationship between ethnic diversity and trust was weak, contingent on its social and economic context, and less generally corrosive than Putnam's account suggested.

In a 2003 book On Genetic Interests, Ethnologist Frank Salter writes:

Relatively homogeneous societies invest more in public goods, indicating a higher level of public altruism. For example, the degree of ethnic homogeneity correlates with the government's share of gross domestic product as well as the average wealth of citizens. Case studies of the United States, Africa and South-East Asia find that multi-ethnic societies are less charitable and less able to cooperate to develop public infrastructure. Moscow beggars receive more gifts from fellow ethnics than from other ethnies [sic]. A recent multi-city study of municipal spending on public goods in the United States found that ethnically or racially diverse cities spend a smaller portion of their budgets and less per capita on public services than do the more homogeneous cities.

Research psychologist Kenan Malik has criticized the views of Frank Salter, arguing that the main issue with Salter's argument is not so much the politically sensitive aspects, but rather the points he shares with broader debates on the evolution of ethnocentrism and identity politics. Malik argues that Salter pays insufficient attention to historical context. In Salter's view group differences are portrayed as a constant and universal feature of human nature. Malik argues that this approach can lead to a distorted interpretation of empirical data. Malik also criticized the theory of ethnic nepotism, and argued that the field studies of favoritism shown to beggars of the benefactor's ethnic group are best explained by cultural factors.

While there is research that suggests that ethnic diversity increases chances of war, lower public goods provision and decreases democratization, there is also research that shows that ethnic diversity in itself is not detrimental to peace, public goods provision or democracy. Rather, it was found that promoting diversity actually helps in advancing disadvantaged students. A 2018 study in the American Political Science Review cast doubts on findings that ethnoracial homogeneity led to greater public goods provision. A 2015 study in the American Journal of Sociology challenged past research showing that racial diversity adversely affected trust. Multiculturalism was found to increase belief in race essentialism.

Racial and ethnic labels can have a significant impact: non-minorities primed to think of themselves as White (versus European American) were subsequently less in favor of multiculturalism and were more racially prejudiced. This was due to decreases in identification with ethnic minorities.

In multicultural societies the first-past-the-post voting system can increase ethnic conflict compared to proportional representation. Multicultural societies with identity politics can result in elections mirroring the identity or ethnic headcount, incentivizing demographic engineering. Electoral engineering to prevent ethnic conflict in multicultural societies was found ineffective.

== Opinions ==
=== Support ===
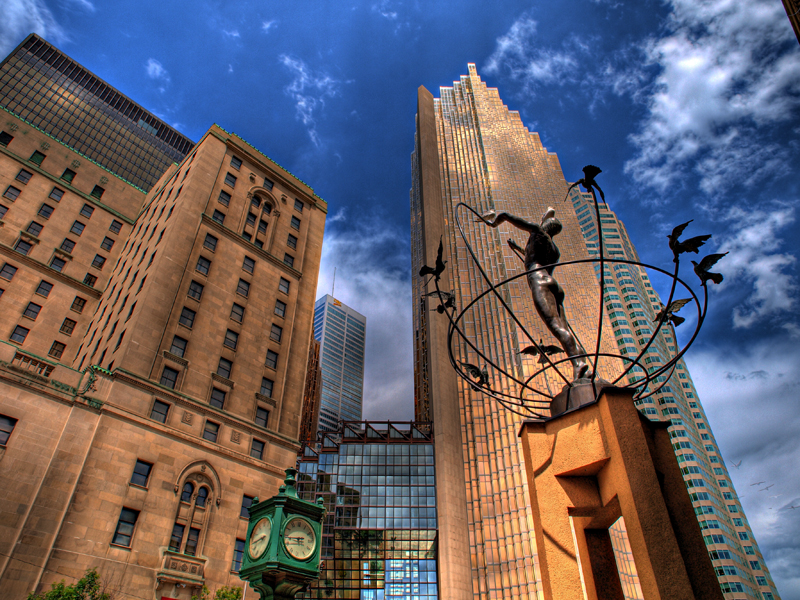
The Monument to Multiculturalism in Toronto, Canada. Four identical sculptures are located in East London (South Africa), in Changchun (China), in Sarajevo (Bosnia and Herzegovina), and in Sydney (Australia).

Multiculturalism is seen by its supporters as a fairer system that allows people to truly express who they are within a society, that is more tolerant and that adapts better to social issues. They argue that culture is not one definable thing based on one race or religion, but rather the result of multiple factors that change as the world changes.

In A Letter Concerning Toleration (1689), John Locke acknowledged that political disturbances were frequently justified in religious terms, but maintained that such unrest typically stemmed from the mistreatment of religious minorities rather than from the beliefs of particular faiths. He argued that any group subjected to systematic discrimination would be likely to resist such conditions. From this perspective, stable social order was seen as more effectively achieved through equal civil rights and legal toleration than through enforced conformity.

Historically, support for modern multiculturalism stems from the changes in Western societies after World War II, in what Susanne Wessendorf calls the "human rights revolution", in which the horrors of institutionalized racism and ethnic cleansing became almost impossible to ignore in the wake of the Holocaust; with the collapse of the European colonial system, as colonized nations in Africa and Asia successfully fought for their independence and pointed out the discriminatory underpinnings of the colonial system; and, in the United States in particular, with the rise of the civil rights movement, which criticized ideals of assimilation that often led to prejudices against those who did not act according to Anglo-American standards and which led to the development of academic ethnic studies programs as a way to counteract the neglect of contributions by racial minorities in classrooms. As this history shows, multiculturalism in Western countries was seen to combat racism, to protect minority communities of all types, and to undo policies that had prevented minorities from having full access to the opportunities for freedom and equality promised by the liberalism that has been the hallmark of Western societies since the Age of Enlightenment.

Will Kymlicka argues for "group differentiated rights", that help both religious and cultural minorities operate within the larger state as a whole, without impinging on the rights of the larger society. He bases this on his opinion that human rights fall short in protecting the rights of minorities, as the state has no stake in protecting the minorities.

C. James Trotman argues that multiculturalism is valuable because it "uses several disciplines to highlight neglected aspects of our social history, particularly the histories of women and minorities [...and] promotes respect for the dignity of the lives and voices of the forgotten. By closing gaps, by raising consciousness about the past, multiculturalism tries to restore a sense of wholeness in a postmodern era that fragments human life and thought."

Tariq Modood argues that in the early years of the 21st century, multiculturalism "is most timely and necessary, and [...] we need more not less", since it is "the form of integration" that (1) best fits the ideal of egalitarianism, (2) has "the best chance of succeeding" in the "post-9/11, post 7/7" world, and (3) has remained "moderate [and] pragmatic".

Bhikhu Parekh counters what he sees as the tendencies to equate multiculturalism with racial minorities "demanding special rights" and to see these as promoting a "thinly veiled racis[m]". Instead, he argues that multiculturalism is in fact "not about minorities" but "is about the proper terms of the relationship between different cultural communities", which means that the standards by which the communities resolve their differences, e.g., "the principles of justice" must not come from only one of the cultures but must come "through an open and equal dialogue between them."

Balibar characterizes criticisms of multiculturalism as "differentialist racism", which he describes as a covert form of racism that does not purport ethnic superiority as much as it asserts stereotypes of perceived "incompatibility of life-styles and traditions".

=== Criticism ===
Critics of multiculturalism often debate whether the multicultural ideal of benignly co-existing cultures that interrelate and influence one another, and yet remain distinct, is sustainable, paradoxical, or even desirable. It is argued that nation states, who would previously have been synonymous with a distinctive cultural identity of their own, lose out to enforced multiculturalism and that this ultimately erodes the host nations' distinct culture.

Sarah Song views cultures as historically shaped entities by its members, and that they lack boundaries due to globalization, thereby making them stronger than others might assume. She goes on to argue against the notion of special rights as she feels cultures are mutually constructive, and are shaped by the dominant culture. Brian Barry advocates a difference-blind approach to culture in the political realm and he rejects group-based rights as antithetical to the universalist liberal project, which he views as based on the individual.

Susan Moller Okin, a feminist professor of political philosophy, argued in 1999, in "Is multiculturalism bad for women?", that the principle that all cultures are equal means that the equal rights of women in particular are sometimes severely violated.

Dick Lamm, former three-term Democratic governor of the US state of Colorado, argued that "diverse peoples worldwide are mostly engaged in hating each other—that is, when they are not killing each other. A diverse, peaceful, or stable society is against most historical precedent."

The American classicist Victor Davis Hanson used the perceived differences in "rationality" between Moctezuma and Cortés to argue that Western culture was superior to every culture in the entire world, which thus led him to reject multiculturalism as a false doctrine that placed all cultures on an equal footing.

In New Zealand, which is officially bi-cultural, multiculturalism has been seen as a threat to the Māori as an attempt by the New Zealand Government to undermine Māori demands for self-determination and encourage assimilation.

Far-right sympathisers have been shown to increasingly take part in a multitude of online discursive efforts directed against global brands' multicultural advertisements.

== Americas ==
=== Argentina ===
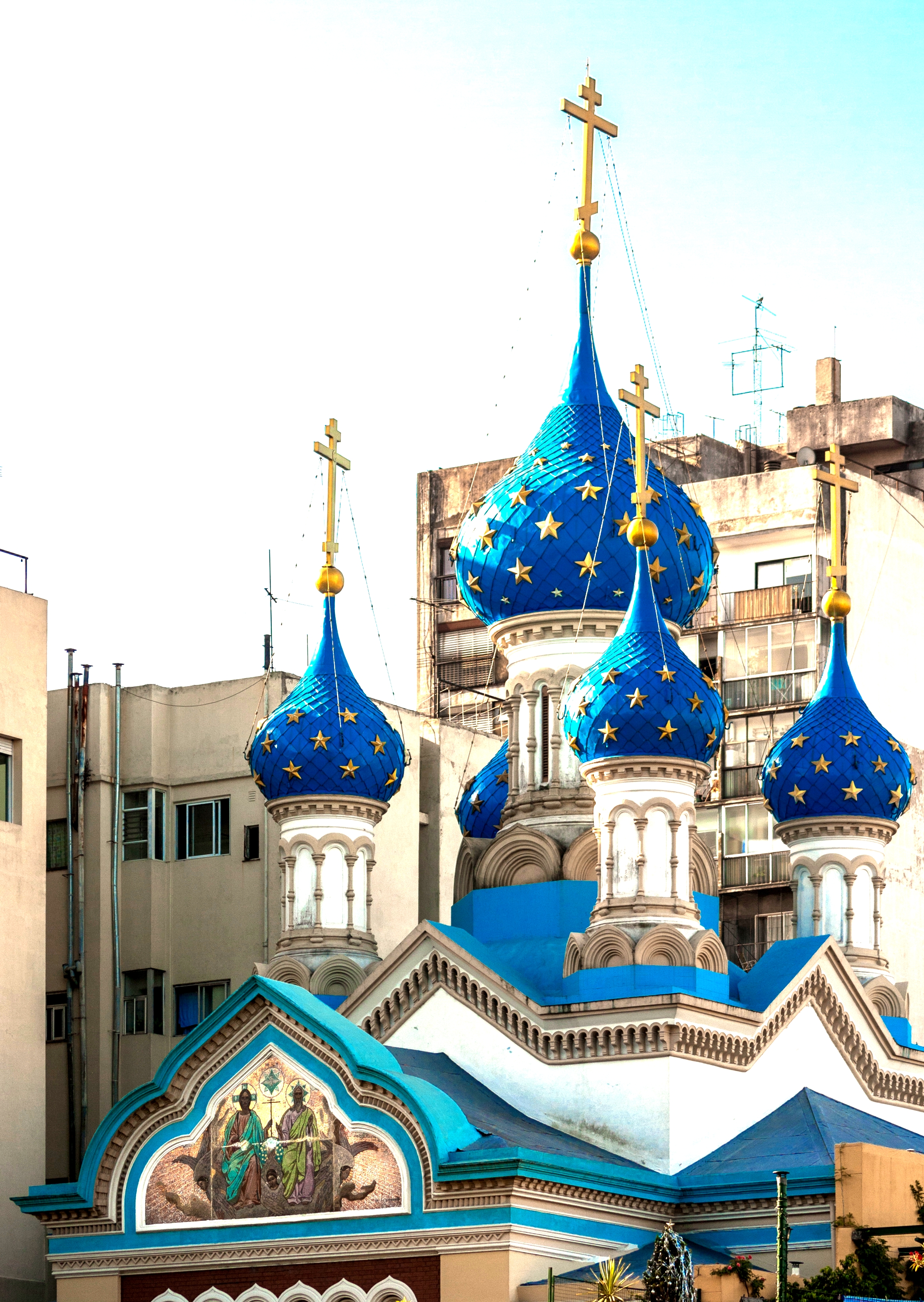
Russian Orthodox Cathedral of the Most Holy Trinity in Buenos Aires

The preamble of Argentina's constitution explicitly promotes immigration and recognizes multiple citizenships held by its citizens. Though 97% of Argentina's population self-identify as of European descent and mestizo to this day a high level of multiculturalism remains a feature of Argentina's culture, allowing foreign festivals and holidays (e.g. Saint Patrick's Day), supporting all kinds of art or cultural expressions from ethnic groups, as well as their diffusion through an important multicultural presence in the media. In Argentina there are recognized regional languages Guaraní in Corrientes, Quechua in Santiago del Estero, Qom, Mocoví, and Wichí in Chaco. According to the National Institute for Indigenous Affairs published on its website, there are 1,779 registered indigenous communities in Argentina, belonging to 39 indigenous peoples.

=== Bolivia ===
Bolivia is a diverse country made up of 36 different types of indigenous groups. Over 62% of Bolivia's population falls into these different indigenous groups, making it the most indigenous country in Latin America. Out of the indigenous groups the Aymara and the Quechua are the largest. The latter 30% of the population is a part of the mestizo, which are a people mixed with European and indigenous ancestry. Bolivia's political administrations have endorsed multicultural politics and in 2009 Bolivia's Constitution was inscribed with multicultural principles. The Constitution of Bolivia recognizes 36 official languages besides Spanish, each language has its own culture and indigenous group. Bolivian culture is celebrated across the country and has heavy influences from the Aymara, the Quechua, the Spanish, and other popular cultures from around Latin America.

=== Brazil ===
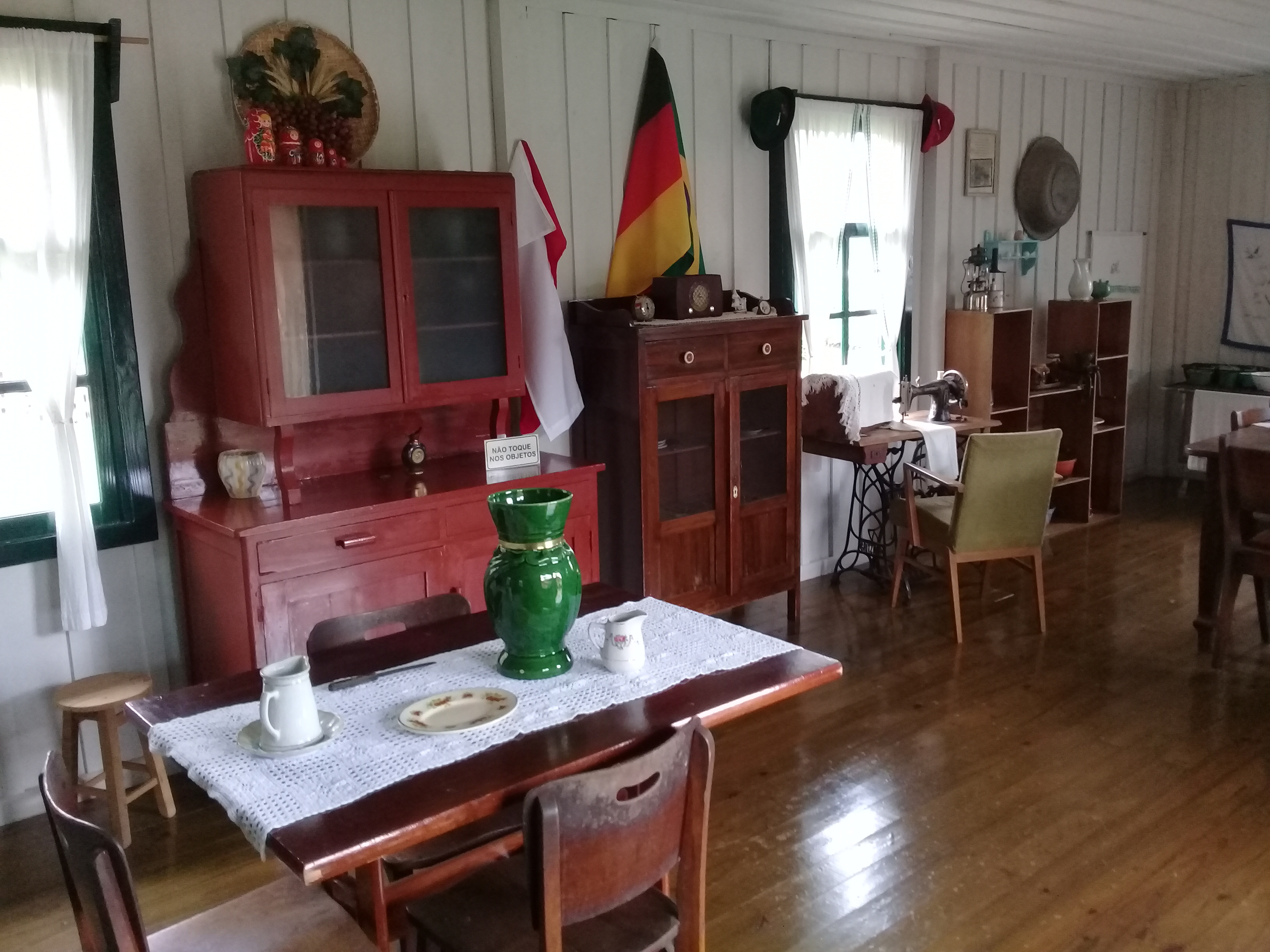
House with elements of people from different countries, including Russians and Germans, in Carambeí, south of the country, a city of Dutch majority

Brazil has been known to acclaim multiculturalism and has undergone many changes regarding this in the past few decades. Brazil is a controversial country when it comes to defining a multicultural country. There are two views: the Harvard Institute of Economic Research points to the fact that Brazil has a large mixed-race population, while researcher Erkan Gören of the University of Oldenburg notes that virtually all Brazilians speaks Portuguese.

Cities such as São Paulo are home to migrants from Japan, Italy, Lebanon, Portugal, and Africa. There is a multicultural presence in this city, and this is prevalent throughout Brazil. Furthermore, Brazil is a country that has made great strides to embrace migrant cultures. There has been increased awareness of anti-blackness and active efforts to combat racism. However, there is still a lack of school engagement in these matters.

=== Canada ===
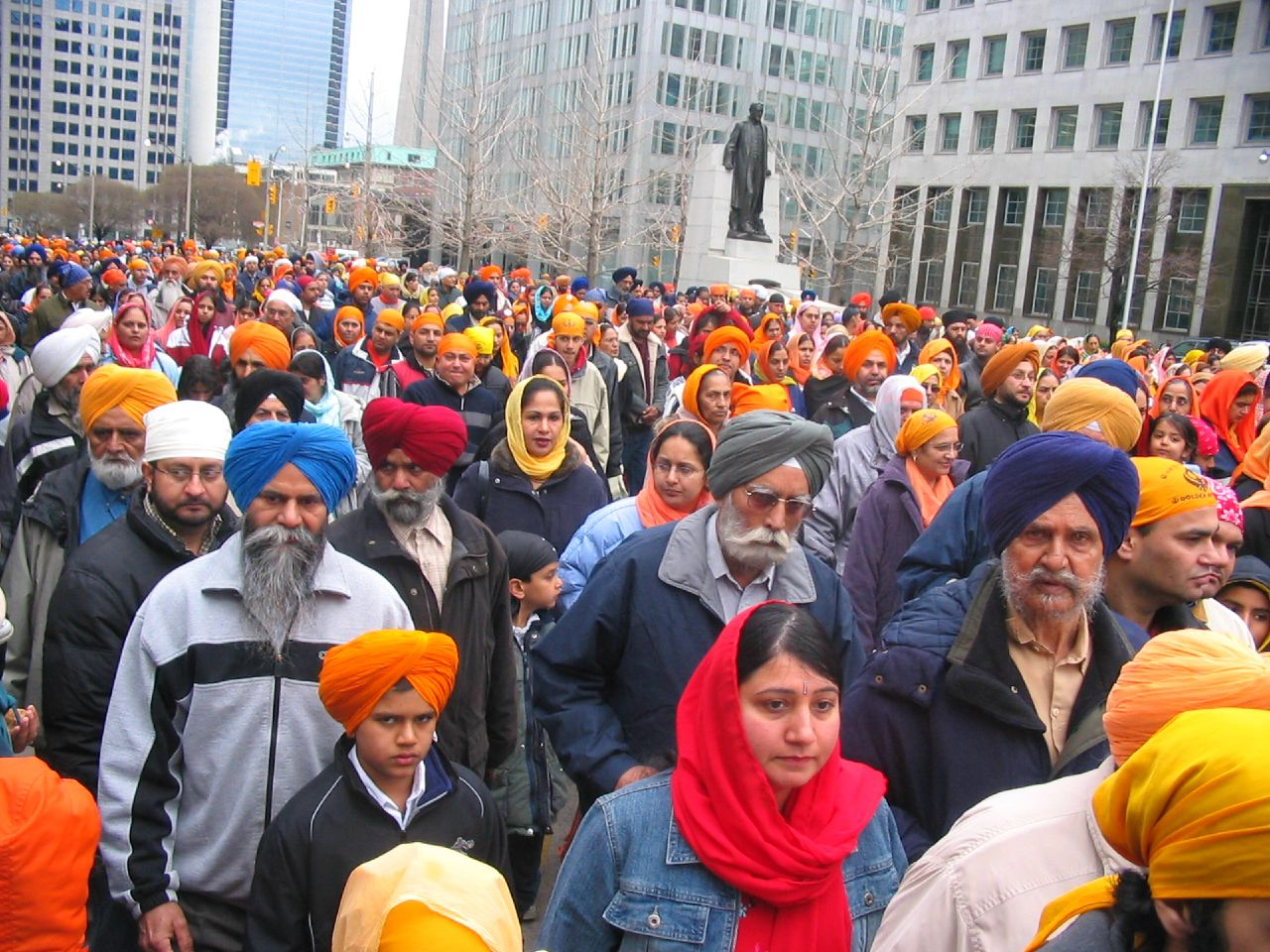
Sikhs celebrating the Sikh new year in Toronto, Canada

Canadian society is often depicted as being "very progressive, diverse, and multicultural," or a just society that formally acknowledges several different cultures and beliefs. Multiculturalism, however, is a misnomer often misidentified as a societal ideal with its associated natural moral sensitivity, whereas it functions as a political instrument for diversity management under official policy. Multiculturalism was adopted as the official policy of the Canadian government during the premiership of Pierre Elliott Trudeau in the 1970s and 1980s, influenced by factors such as the militant politics of Québécois nationalism, rising Indigenous discontent over the assimilationist policies outlined in the 1969 White Paper, the threat of American cultural annexation, the need to secure ethnic votes in immigrant-rich urban centers, and the appeasement of other European ethnic groups.

Multiculturalism is reflected in the law through the Canadian Multiculturalism Act and section 27 of the Canadian Charter of Rights and Freedoms. Canadian multiculturalism is often seen as cherishing immigrant ways of life from outside the country, and as such, it is looked upon with admiration resulting in dismissing of most critics of the concept. The Broadcasting Act of 1991 asserts the Canadian broadcasting system should reflect the diversity of cultures in the country. This conceptual transition of multiculturalism is also reflected in Canada's official discourse, where attitudes about "multiculturalism" have shifted to focus on "diversity," driven by increasing immigration rates. It now emphasizes Canada's growing multicultural makeup and the diversity of ethnic and racial groups within the country adhering to a politics of recognition, rather than a politics of interrogation that could have been instrumental in improving social integration by addressing dominant power dynamics and the privileges that affect marginalized groups. Multiculturalism in Canada is often globally recognized as one of the country's significant accomplishments in diversity management, and a key distinguishing element of Canadian national identity.

In a 2002 interview with The Globe and Mail, Karīm al-Hussainī, the 49th Aga Khan of the Ismaili Muslims, described Canada as "the most successful pluralist society on the face of our globe", citing it as "a model for the world". He explained that the experience of Canadian governance—its commitment to pluralism and its support for the rich multicultural diversity of its people—is something that must be shared and would be of benefit to all societies in other parts of the world. The Economist ran a cover story in 2016 praising Canada as the most successful multicultural society in the West. The Economist argued that Canada's multiculturalism was a source of strength that united the diverse population and by attracting immigrants from around the world was also an engine of economic growth as well. The influence of the transitioned ideology of multiculturalism in the public sphere has led many public and private groups in Canada to work toward supporting both multiculturalism and recent immigrants to Canada. In an effort to support recent Filipino immigrants to Alberta, for example, one school board partnered with a local university and an immigration agency to support these new families in their school and community.

=== Colombia ===
Colombia, with an estimated population of 51 million inhabitants, is populated by a great variety of ethnic groups. Approximately 49% of its population is Mestizo, 37% White, 10% African descent, 3.4% Indigenous and 0.6 Romani.

It is estimated that 18.8 million Colombians are direct descendants of Europeans, either by one of their parents or grandparents. Mainly from Spain, Italy, Germany, Poland and England, they represent 37% of its population. The Arab descent also predominates in the country. The Syrians, Lebanese and Palestinians are the largest post-independence immigrants to the country, so much so that Colombia has the second largest Arab diaspora in Latin America, with a little more than 3.2 million descendants, which represents 6.4% of its population.

Article 7 of the constitution enshrines recognition and protection of Colombia's multicultural and multiethnic nature.

=== Ecuador ===
Although Ecuador's constitution now officially recognizes multiculturalism, this legal acknowledgment has largely stayed on paper, and historical attitudes rooted in 'monocultural mestizaje' continue to shape social and racial hierarchies in the country, as can be seen in the following paragraphs.

In Ecuador, multiculturalism, or pluriculturalism, first became officially recognized in the constitution in 1998, as stated in the first article, which defines the nation as "a social state governed by the rule of law, sovereign, unitary, independent, democratic, pluricultural, and multiethnic" (Ecuador, 1998, art. 1).

The previous Constitution, from 1979, made no mention of multiculturalism or pluriculturalism, and only stated that Ecuador is "a sovereign, independent, democratic, and unitary state, with a republican government that is elected, accountable, and subject to periodic alternation in power" (Ecuador, 1979, art. 1).

Very telling of the attitudes of the period leading up to the 1979 constitution, is the following anecdote, found in the essay, "El Mestizaje: An All-Inclusive Ideology of Exclusion", by Ronald Stutzman: "A clue to understanding the significance of ethnic identity in the context of national development is found in an incident that occurred (in) (…) 1972 in Puyo, (in) (…) Ecuador's Amazonian interior. General Guillermo Rodríguez Lara, then president of the republic, was in town (…). In a lengthy speech, the general (…) invoked his own legendary ancestry. He emphasized that he had always believed all Ecuadorians to be part indigenous, all sharing something of the blood of the Inca Atahualpa, and that although he did not know how he acquired such blood, he was certain he too was part Indian. "There is no more Indian problem," he insisted; "we all become white when we accept the goals of national culture" (Stutzman, 1981, p. 45)

It is clear that if even the president of the country at the time said that the "goals of national culture" were a "monocultural mestizaje" or, even more directly and overtly, "blanqueamiento", then it is safe to assume this was a widespread national sentiment and attitude, as it was in fact the official stance.

More than 50 years have gone by since Rodríguez Lara said this in an official speech, and multiculturalism is also officially recognized in the current Constitution (2008): "Ecuador is a constitutional state of rights and justice, social, democratic, sovereign, independent, unitary, intercultural, plurinational, and secular. It is organized as a republic and governed in a decentralized manner" (Ecuador, 2008, art. 1).

However, despite these constitutional reforms, historical attitudes toward race and nationhood continue to influence contemporary Ecuadorian society. As scholars like Jean Muteba Rahier, PhD, Professor of Anthropology and African & African Diaspora Studies at Florida International University (FIU), who has studied the African diaspora in the Americas, and mostly in Latin America, and, especially, in Ecuador, notes: "The passage of the official or national stance from 'monocultural mestizaje' to 'multiculturalism' has not been accompanied by the transformations that the change of vocabulary might suggest. Instead, it has reinscribed the prevalent racial order in a 'new' narration of the nation" (Rahier, 2008, p. 148).

Therefore, legally, Ecuador is a multicultural country, but, in practice, it still subscribes to a notion of nationhood rooted in "monocultural mestizaje", which refers to the mix of indigenous people of the Americas with euro-descendant white people, but excluding afro-descendants. As Professor Tanya Hernández, an internationally recognized comparative race law expert explains: "The (way) the different Spanish American countries responded to eugenics varied depending upon the extent to which they were able to attract European immigrants, and the size of their indigenous populations. Some nations focused (…) (on) a 'monocultural mestizaje', (...)(that is,) the mixture of the indigenous with whites to the complete exclusion of blacks (Ecuador and Mexico)." (Hernández, 2012, p. 22-23).

As Hernández explains, eugenics is "a pseudoscientific movement that sought to improve the human race by preserving the genetic purity of whites." (Hernández, 2012, p. 19).

Ecuador's constitutions recognize multiculturalism, but historical attitudes rooted in "monocultural mestizaje" show that this recognition has often stayed on paper, revealing a persistent gap between law and social reality.

=== Mexico ===
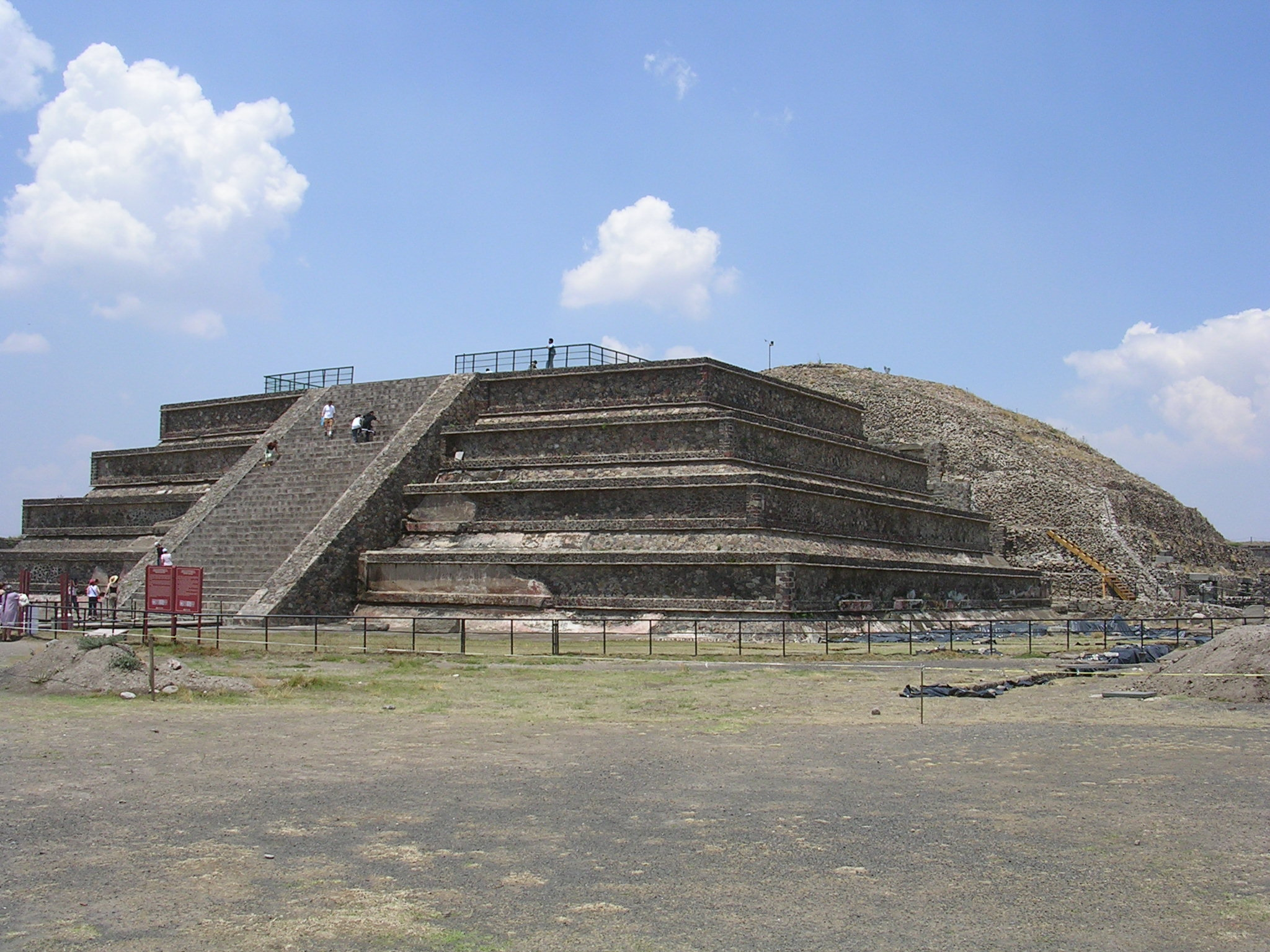
Teotihuacan

Mexico has historically always been a multicultural country. After the betrayal of Hernán Cortés to the Aztecs, the Spanish conquered the Aztec Empire and colonized indigenous people. They influenced the indigenous religion, politics, culture and ethnicity. The Spanish opened schools in which they taught Christianity, and the Spanish language eventually surpassed indigenous languages, making it the most spoken language in Mexico. Mestizo was also born from the conquest, which meant being half-Indigenous and half-Spanish.

Mexico City has recently been integrating rapidly, doing much better than many cities in a sample conducted by the Intercultural Cities Index (being the only non-European city, alongside Montreal, on the index). Mexico is an ethnically diverse country with a population composed of approximately 123 million in 2017. There is a wide variety of ethnic groups, the major group being Mestizos followed by White Mexicans and Indigenous Mexicans. There are many other ethnic groups such as Arab Mexicans, Afro-Mexicans and Asian Mexicans.

From the year 2000 to 2010, the number of people in Mexico that were born in another country doubled, reaching a total of 961,121 people, mostly coming from Guatemala and the United States. Mexico is quickly becoming a melting pot, with many immigrants coming into the country. It is considered to be a cradle of civilization, which influences their multiculturalism and diversity, by having different civilizations influence them. A distinguishable trait of Mexico's culture is the mestizaje of its people, which caused the combination of Spanish influence, their indigenous roots while also adapting the culture traditions from their immigrants.

=== Peru ===
Peru is a country that embraces multiculturalism. In 2016 the INEI reported a total population of 31 million people. They share their borders with Ecuador, Colombia, Brazil, Chile and Bolivia, and have welcomed many immigrants into their country creating a diverse community.

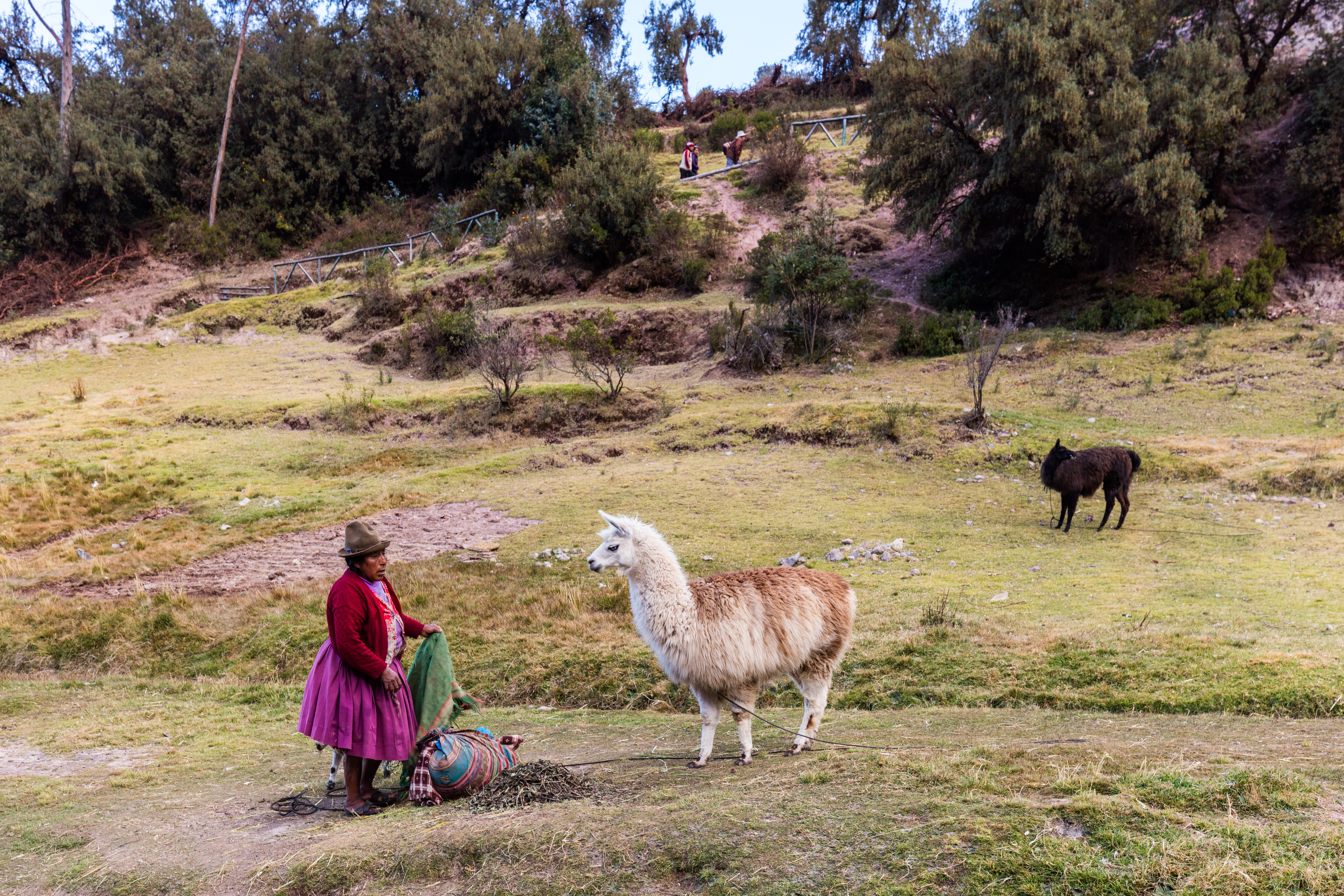
Tambomachay, Cuzco, Peru

Peru is the home to Amerindians, but after the Spanish Conquest, the Spanish brought African, and Asian peoples as slaves to Peru creating a mix of ethnic groups. After slavery was no longer permitted in Peru, African-Peruvians and Asian-Peruvians have contributed to Peruvian culture in many ways. Today, Amerindians make up 25.8% of the population, Mestizos 60.2%, White 5.9% and 4.8% is composed by Black, Chinese, Japanese and others. In 1821, Peru's president José de San Martín gave foreigners the freedom to start industries in Peru's ground, 2 years after, foreigners that lived in Peru for more than 5 years were considered naturalized citizens, which then decreased to 3 years.

=== United States ===
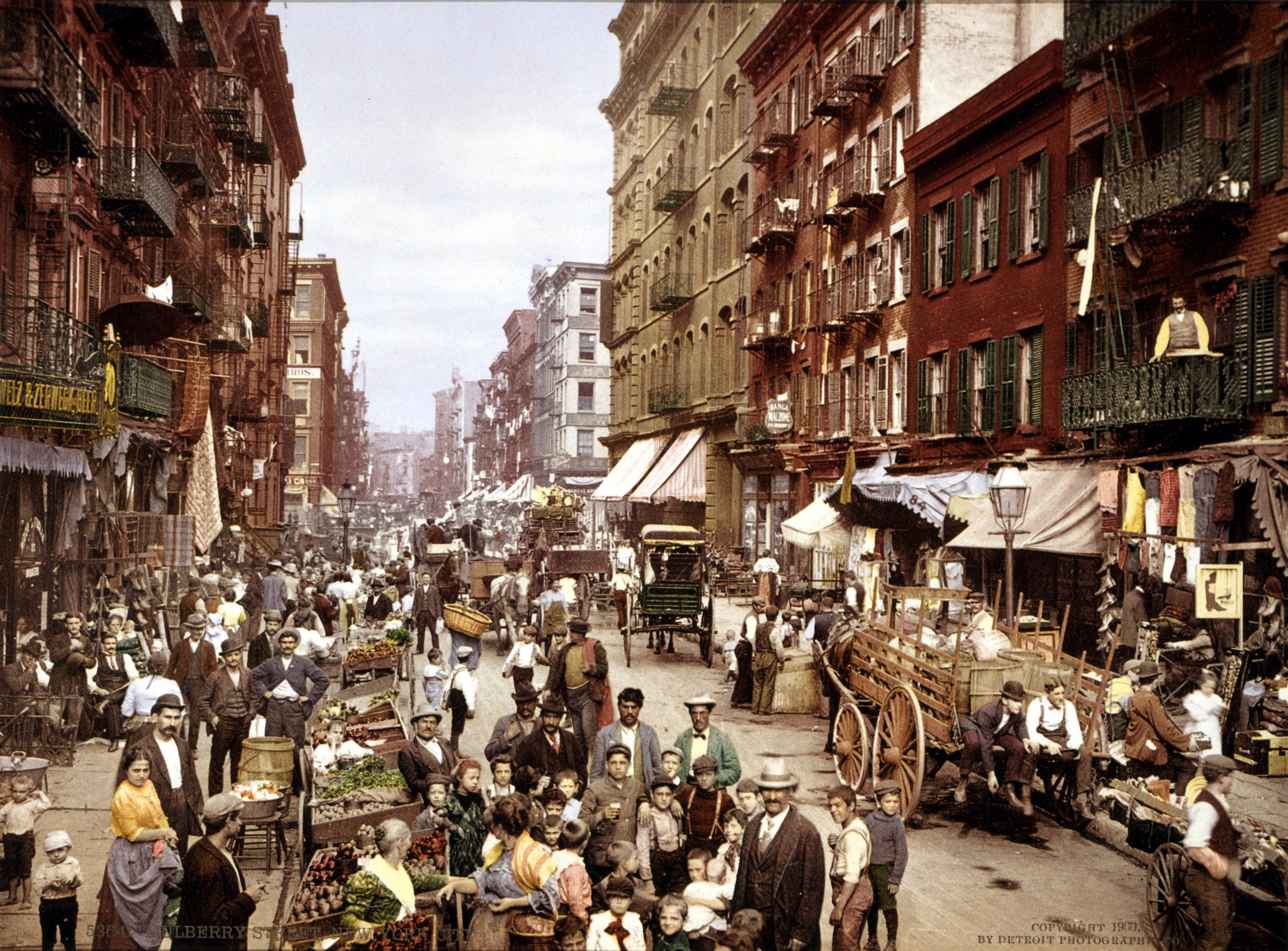

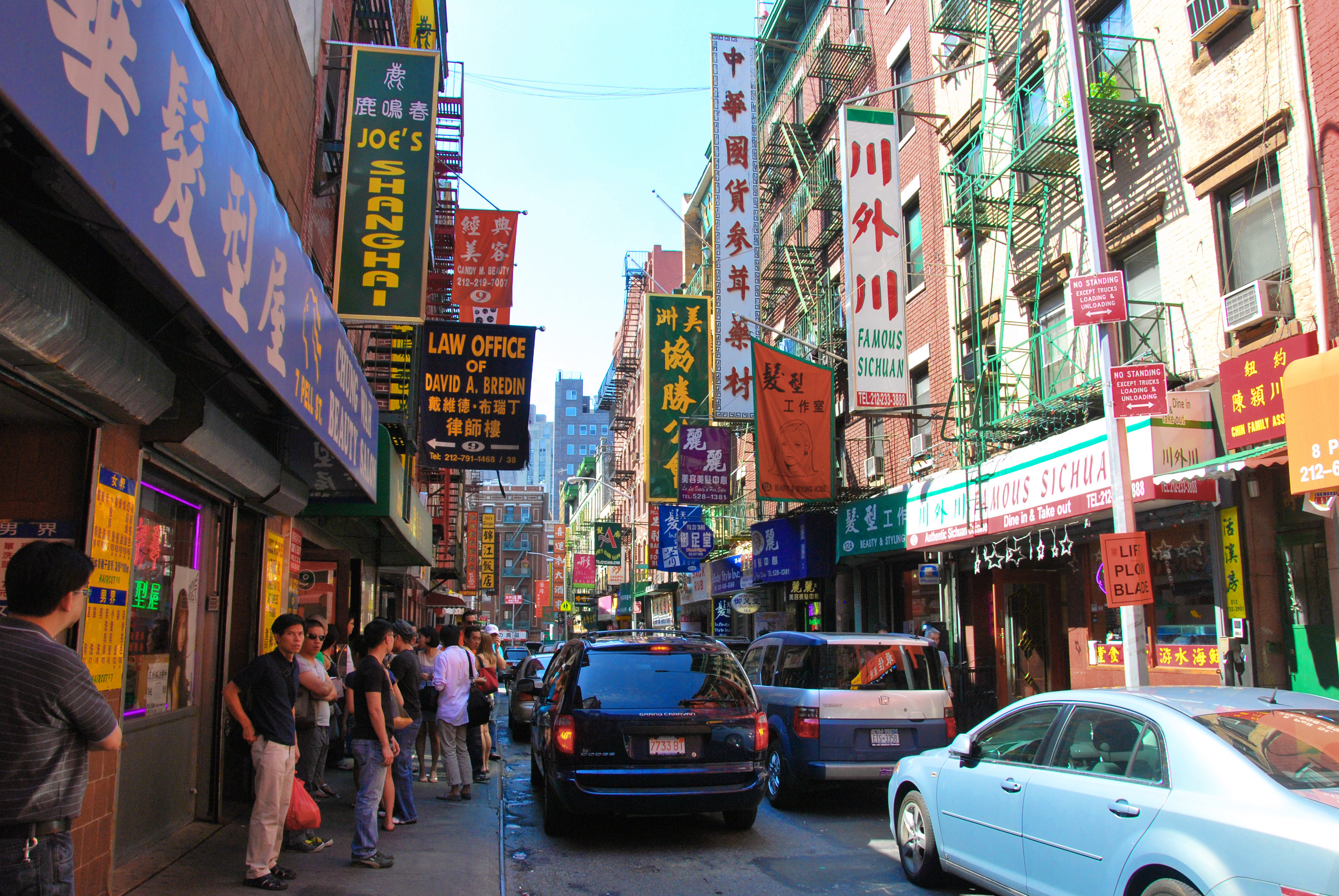
Little Italy (top, c. 1900) in New York City abuts Manhattan's Chinatown.

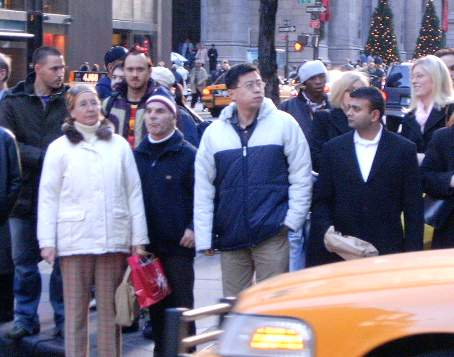
People waiting to cross Fifth Avenue

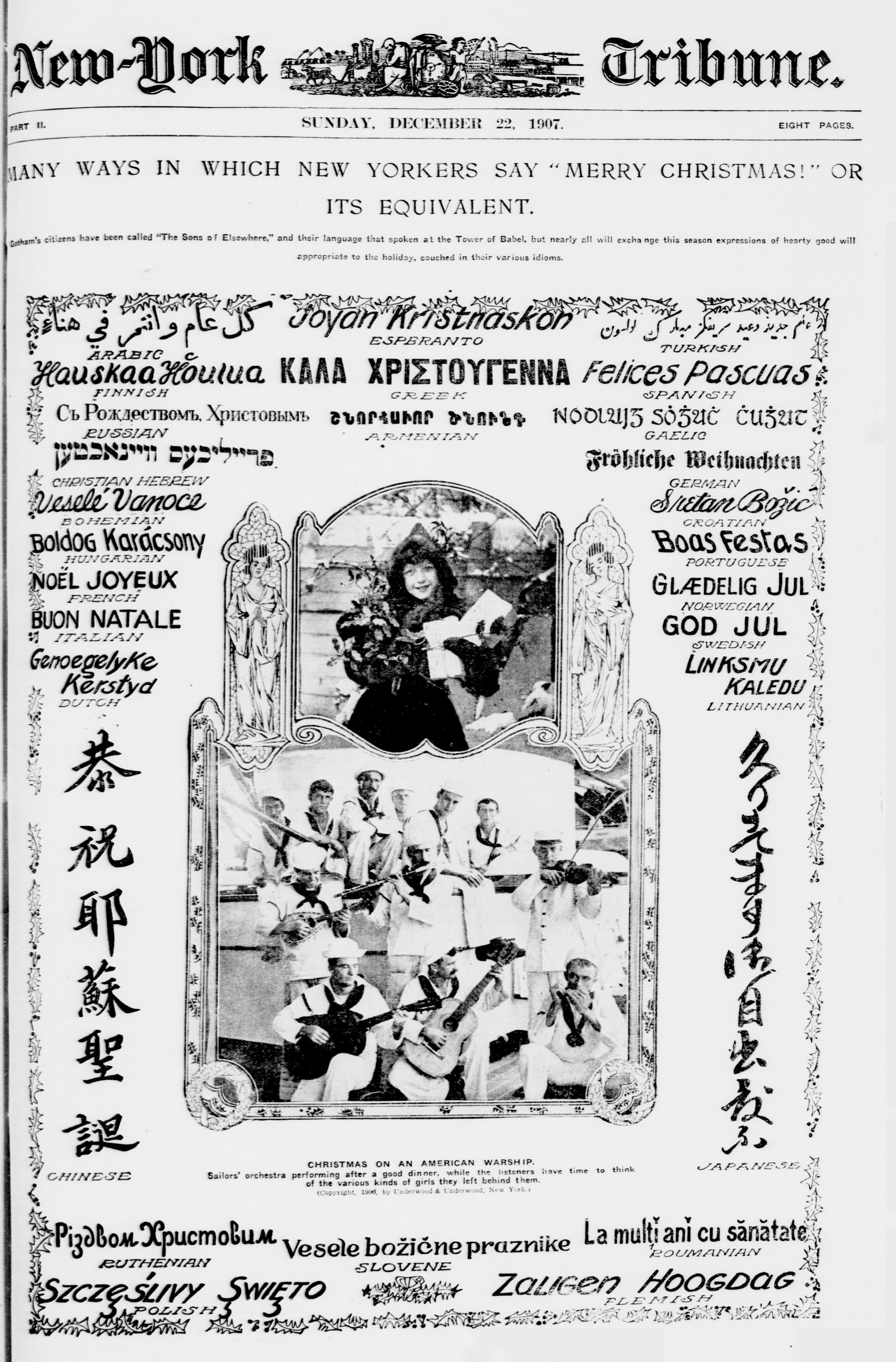
Poster from 1907: Many ways in which New Yorkers say "Merry Christmas" or its equivalent; in Arabic, Armenian, Chinese, Croatian, Czech, Dutch, Esperanto, Finnish, Flemish, French, Gaelic, German, Greek, Yiddish (labeled as "Christian Hebrew"), Hungarian, Italian, Japanese, Lithuanian, Norwegian, Polish, Portuguese, Romanian, Russian, Slovene, Spanish, Swedish, Turkish and Ukrainian. "Gotham's citizens have been called "The Sons of Elsewhere", and their language that spoken at the Tower of Babel..."

Although official multiculturalism policy is not established at the federal level, ethnic and cultural diversity is common in rural, suburban and urban areas.

Continuous mass immigration was a feature of the United States economy and society since the first half of the 19th century. The absorption of the stream of immigrants became, in itself, a prominent feature of America's national myth. The idea of the melting pot is a metaphor that implies that all the immigrant cultures are mixed and amalgamated without state intervention. The melting pot theory implied that each individual immigrant, and each group of immigrants, assimilated into American society at their own pace. This is different from multiculturalism as it is defined above, which does not include complete assimilation and integration. The melting pot tradition co-exists with a belief in national unity, dating from the American founding fathers:

Providence has been pleased to give this one connected country to one united people – a people descended from the same ancestors, speaking the same language, professing the same religion, attached to the same principles of government, very similar in their manners and customs... This country and this people seem to have been made for each other, and it appears as if it was the design of Providence, that an inheritance so proper and convenient for a band of brethren, united to each other by the strongest ties, should never be split into a number of unsocial, jealous, and alien sovereignties.

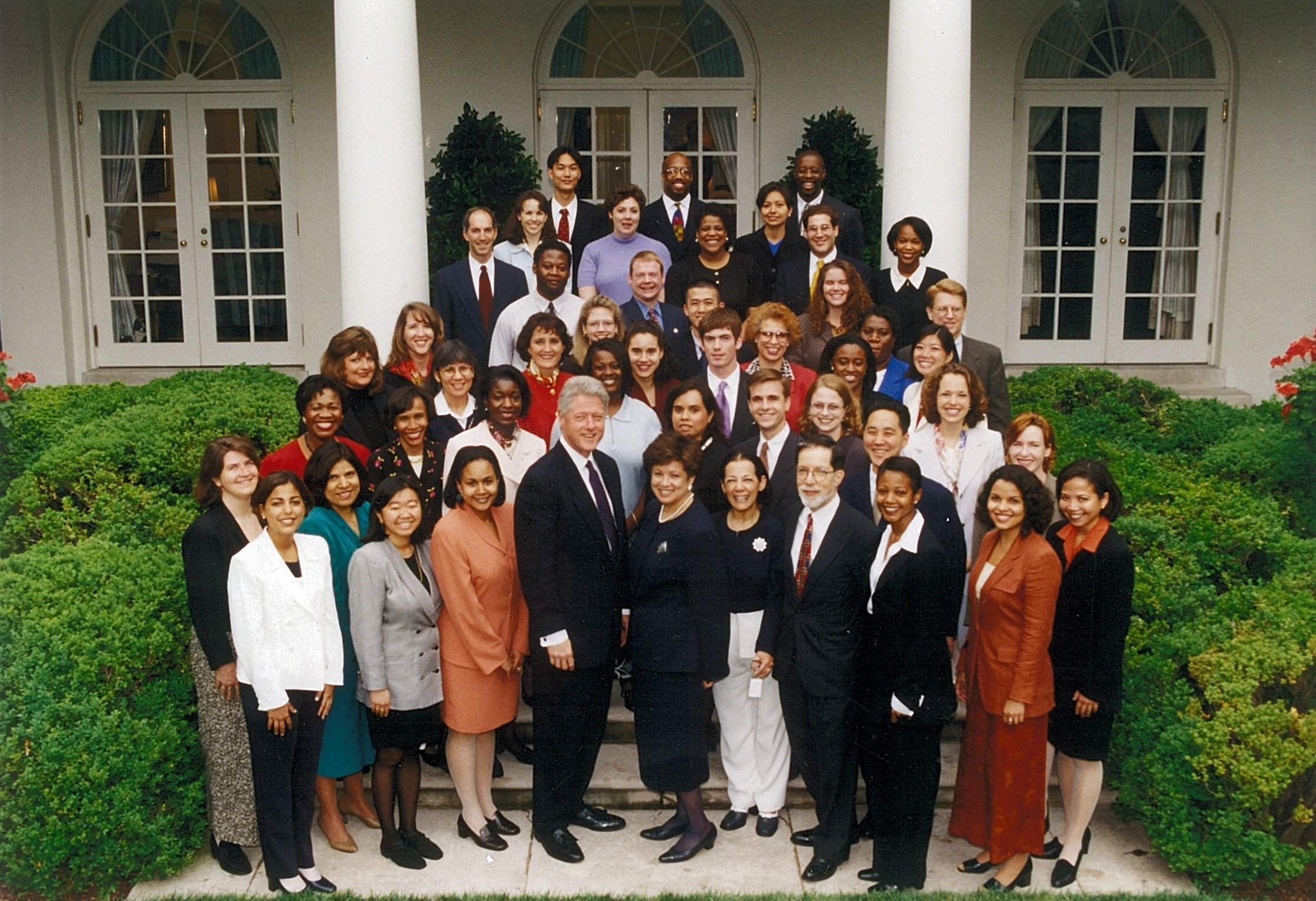
Staff of President Clinton's One America Initiative. The President's Initiative on Race was a critical element in President Clinton's effort to prepare the country to embrace diversity.

As a philosophy, multiculturalism began as part of the pragmatism movement at the end of the 19th century in Europe and the United States, then as political and cultural pluralism at the turn of the 20th century. It was partly in response to a new wave of European imperialism in sub-Saharan Africa and the massive immigration of Southern and Eastern Europeans to the United States and Latin America. Philosophers, psychologists and historians and early sociologists such as Charles Sanders Peirce, William James, George Santayana, Horace Kallen, John Dewey, W. E. B. Du Bois and Alain Locke developed concepts of cultural pluralism, from which emerged what we understand today as multiculturalism. In Pluralistic Universe (1909), William James espoused the idea of a "plural society". James saw pluralism as "crucial to the formation of philosophical and social humanism to help build a better, more egalitarian society.

The educational approach to multiculturalism has since spread to the grade school system, as school systems try to rework their curricula to introduce students to diversity earlier – often on the grounds that it is important for minority students to see themselves represented in the classroom. Studies estimated 46 million Americans ages 14 to 24 to be the most diverse generation in American society. In 2009 and 2010, controversy erupted in Texas as the state's curriculum committee made several changes to the state's requirements, often at the expense of minorities. They chose to juxtapose Abraham Lincoln's inaugural address with that of Confederate president Jefferson Davis; they debated removing Supreme Court Justice Thurgood Marshall and labor-leader Cesar Chavez and rejected calls to include more Hispanic figures, in spite of the high Hispanic population in the state.

According to a 2000 analysis of domestic terrorism in the United States, "A distinctive feature of American terrorism is the ideological diversity of perpetrators. White racists are responsible for over a third of the deaths, and black militants have claimed almost as many. Almost all of the remaining deaths are attributable to Puerto Rican nationalists, Islamic extremists, revolutionary leftists and emigre groups." Twenty years later, far-right and white racists were observed as the leading perpetrators of domestic terrorism in the U.S. According to a 2020 study by the Strategic & International Studies, right-wing extremists are responsible for the murder of 329 people since 1994 (over half due to the terrorist bombing of the 1995 bombing of the Alfred P. Murrah building in Oklahoma City, which killed 168 people).

==== Effect of diversity on civic engagement ====
A 2007 study by Robert Putnam encompassing 30,000 people across the US found that diversity had a negative effect on civic engagement. The greater the diversity, the fewer people voted and the less they volunteered for community projects; also, trust among neighbours was only half that of homogenous communities. Putnam says, however, that "in the long run immigration and diversity are likely to have important cultural, economic, fiscal, and developmental benefits", as long as society successfully overcomes the short-term problems. Putnam adds that his "extensive research and experience confirm the substantial benefits of diversity, including racial and ethnic diversity, to our society."

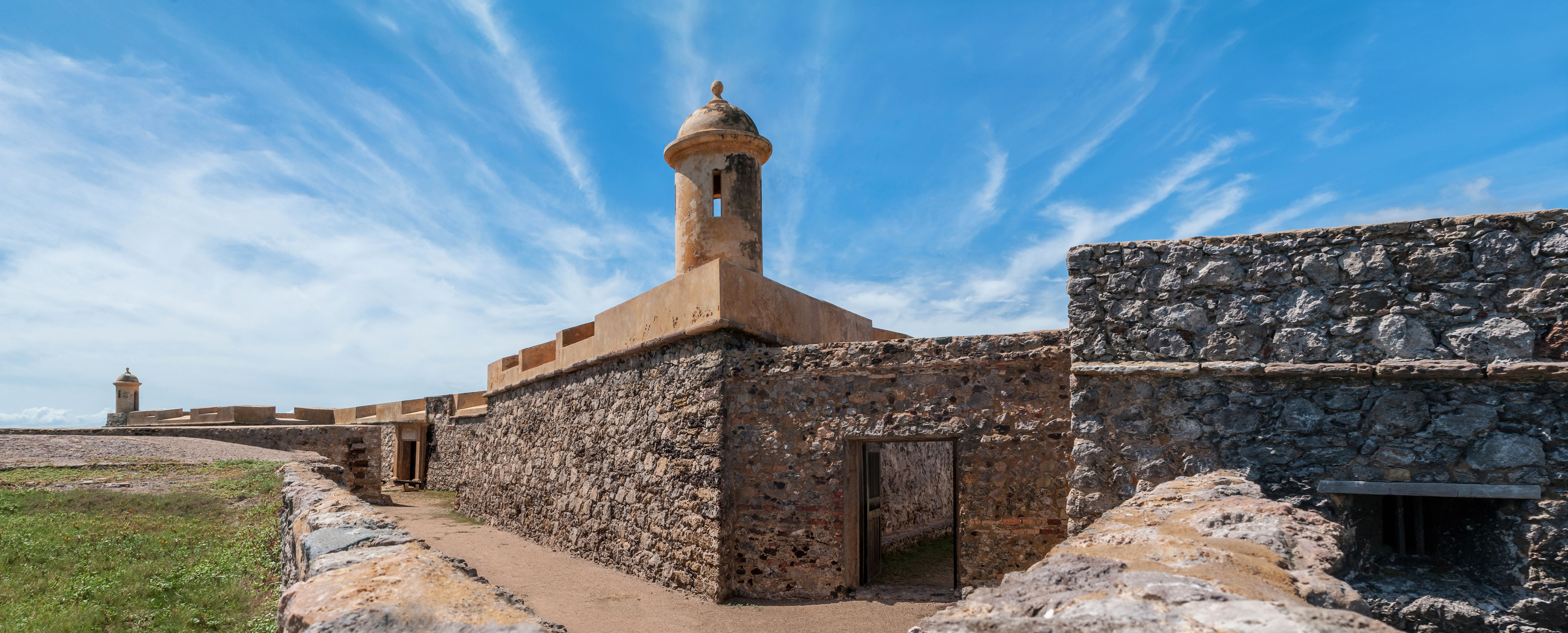
Bartizan in Venezuela

=== Venezuela ===
Venezuela is home to a variety of ethnic groups, with an estimated population of 32 million, as of 2018. Their population is composed of approximately 68% mestizo, which means of mixed race. Venezuelan culture is mainly composed of a mixture of their indigenous culture, Spanish, and African. There was a heavy influence of Spanish culture due to the Spanish Conquest, which influenced their religion, language and traditions. African influence can be seen in their music. While Spanish is Venezuela's main language, there are more than 40 indigenous languages spoken to this day.

== Europe ==
Ethno-linguistic map of Austria-Hungary, 1910

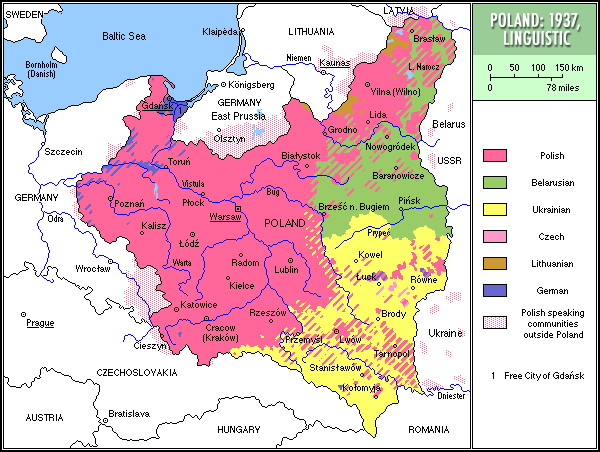
Ethno-linguistic map of the Second Polish Republic, 1937

Historically, Europe has always been a mixture of Latin, Slavic, Germanic, Uralic, Celtic, Hellenic, Illyrian, Thracian and other cultures influenced by the importation of Jewish, Christian, Muslim and other belief systems; although the continent was supposedly unified by the super-position of Imperial Roman Christianity, it is accepted that geographic and cultural differences continued from antiquity into the modern age.

In the nineteenth century, the ideology of nationalism transformed the way Europeans thought about the state. Existing states were broken up and new ones created; the new nation-states were founded on the principle that each nation is entitled to its own sovereignty and to engender, protect, and preserve its own unique culture and history. Unity, under this ideology, is seen as an essential feature of the nation and the nation-state; unity of descent, unity of culture, unity of language, and often unity of religion. The nation-state constitutes a culturally homogeneous society, although some national movements recognised regional differences.

Where cultural unity was insufficient, it was encouraged and enforced by the state. The nineteenth century nation-states developed an array of policies – the most important was compulsory primary education in the national language. The language itself was often standardised by a linguistic academy, and regional languages were ignored or suppressed. Some nation-states pursued violent policies of cultural assimilation and even ethnic cleansing.

Some countries in the European Union have introduced policies for "social cohesion", "integration", and (sometimes) "assimilation". The policies include:

- Compulsory courses and/or tests on national history, on the constitution and the legal system (e.g., the computer-based test for individuals seeking naturalisation in the UK named Life in the United Kingdom test)
- Introduction of an official national history, such as the national canon defined for the Netherlands by the van Oostrom Commission, and promotion of that history (e.g., by exhibitions about national heroes)
- Tests designed to elicit "unacceptable" values. In Baden-Württemberg, immigrants are asked what they would do if their son says he is a homosexual (the desired answer is that they would accept it).

Other countries have instituted policies which encourage cultural separation. The concept of "Cultural exception" proposed by France in the General Agreement on Tariffs and Trade (GATT) negotiations in 1993 was an example of a measure aimed at protecting local cultures.

=== Bulgaria ===
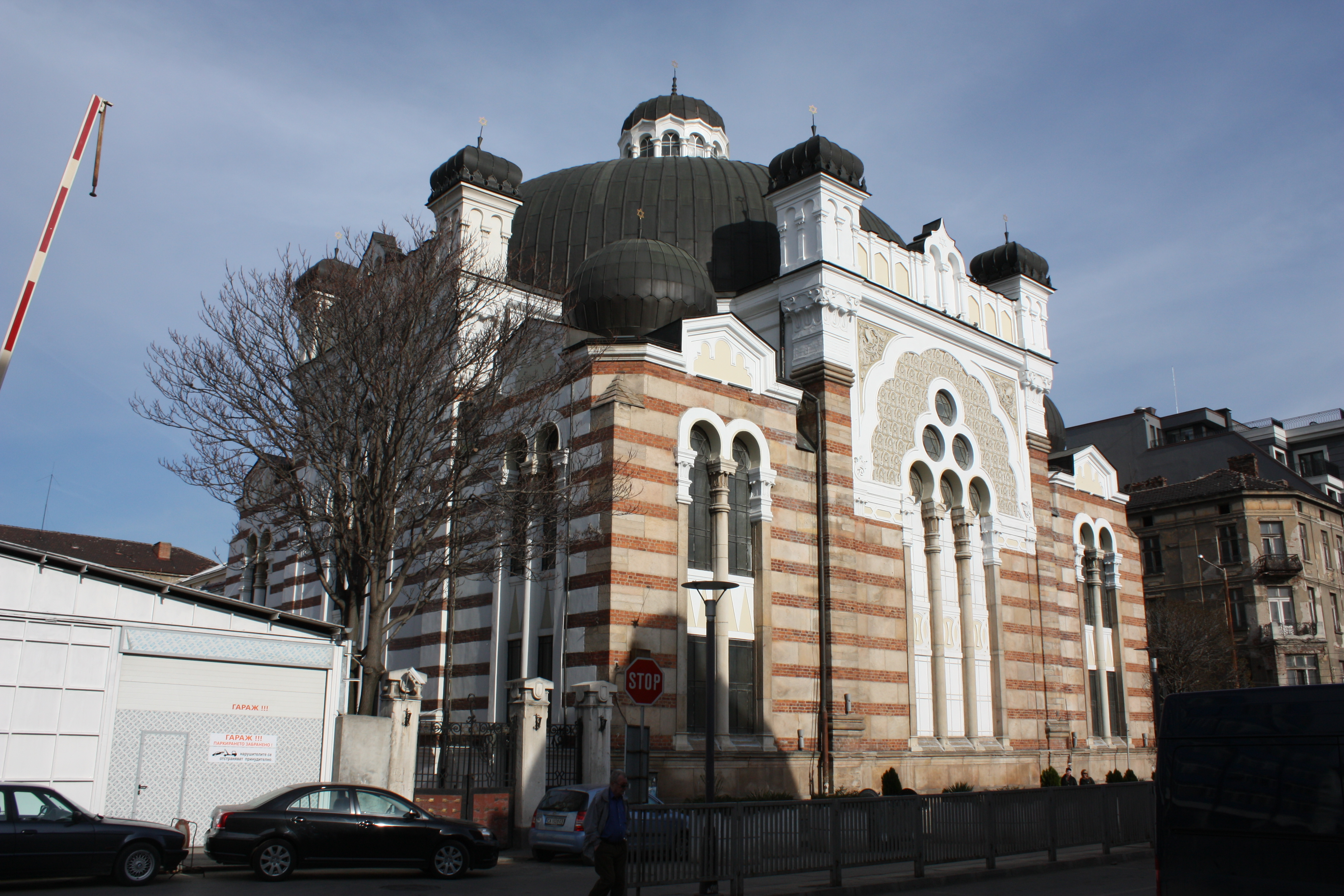
Sofia Synagogue

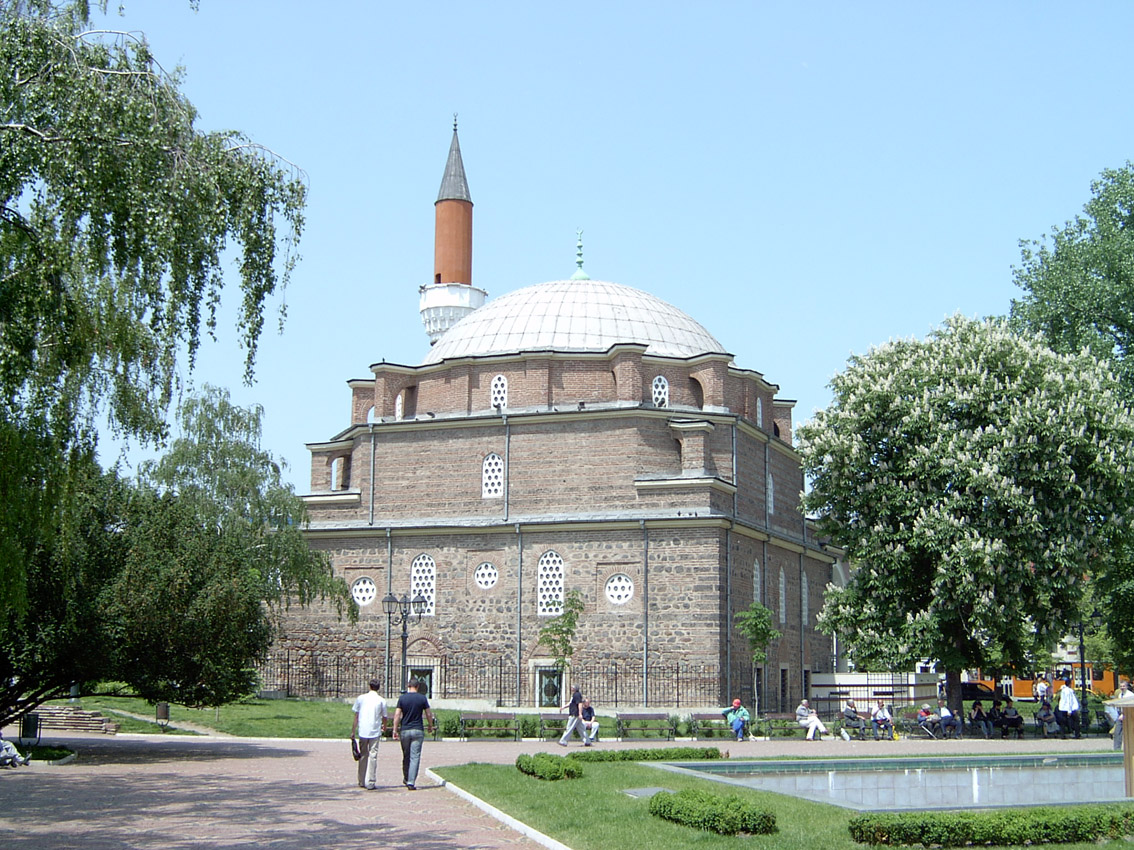
Banya Bashi Mosque in Sofia

Since its establishment in the seventh century, Bulgaria has hosted many religions, ethnic groups and nations. The capital city Sofia is the only European city that has peacefully functioning, within walking distance of 300 metres, four Places of worship of the major religions: Eastern Orthodox (St Nedelya Church), Islam (Banya Bashi Mosque), Roman Catholicism (St. Joseph Cathedral), and Orthodox Judaism (Sofia Synagogue, the third-largest synagogue in Europe).

This unique arrangement has been called by historians a "multicultural cliche". It has also become known as "The Square of Religious Tolerance" and has initiated the construction of a 100-square-metre scale model of the site that is to become a symbol of the capital.

Furthermore, unlike some other Nazi Germany allies or German-occupied countries excluding Denmark, Bulgaria managed to save its entire 48,000-strong Jewish population during World War II from deportation to Nazi concentration camps. According to Dr Marinova-Christidi, the main reason for the efforts of Bulgarian people to save their Jewish population during WWII is that within the region, they "co-existed for centuries with other religions" – giving it a unique multicultural and multiethnic history.

Consequently, within the Balkan region, Bulgaria has become an example for multiculturalism in terms of variety of religions, artistic creativity and ethnicity. Its largest ethnic minority groups, Turks and Roma, enjoy wide political representation. In 1984, following a campaign by the Communist regime for a forcible change of the Islamic names of the Turkish minority, an underground organisation called «National Liberation Movement of the Turks in Bulgaria» was formed which headed the Turkish community's opposition movement. On 4 January 1990, the activists of the movement registered an organisation with the legal name Movement for Rights and Freedoms (MRF) (in Bulgarian: Движение за права и свободи: in Turkish: Hak ve Özgürlükler Hareketi) in the Bulgarian city of Varna. At the moment of registration, it had 33 members, at present, according to the organisation's website, 68,000 members plus 24,000 in the organisation's youth wing . In 2012, Bulgarian Turks were represented at every level of government: local, with MRF having mayors in 35 municipalities, at parliamentary level with MRF having 38 deputies (14% of the votes in Parliamentary elections for 2009–13) and at executive level, where there is one Turkish minister, Vezhdi Rashidov. 21 Roma political organisations were founded between 1997–2003 in Bulgaria.

=== France ===
After the end of World War II in 1945, immigration significantly increased. During the period of reconstruction, France lacked the labour to do so, and as a result; the French Government was eager to recruit immigrants coming from all over Europe, the Americas, Africa and Asia.

Although there was a presence of, Vietnamese in France since the late-nineteenth century (mostly students and workers), a wave of Vietnamese migrated after 1954. These migrants consisted of those who were loyal to the colonial government and those married to French colonists. Following the partition of Vietnam, students and professionals from South Vietnam continued to arrive in France. Although many initially returned to the country after a few years, as the Vietnam War situation worsened, a majority decided to remain in France and brought their families over as well.

This period also saw a significant wave of immigrants from Algeria. As the Algerian War started in 1954, there were already 200,000 Algerian immigrants in France. However, because of the tension between the Algerians and the French, these immigrants were no longer welcome. This conflict between the two sides led to the Paris Massacre of 17 October 1961, when the police used force against an Algerian demonstration on the streets of Paris. After the war, after Algeria gained its independence, the free circulation between France and Algeria was once again allowed, and the number of Algerian immigrants started to increase drastically. From 1962–75, the Algerian immigrant population increased from 350,000 to 700,000. Many of these immigrants were known as the "harkis", and the others were known as the "pieds-noirs". The "harkis" were Algerians who supported the French during the Algerian War; once the war was over, they were deeply resented by other Algerians, and thus had to flee to France. The "pieds-noirs" were European settlers who moved to Algeria, but migrated back to France since 1962 when Algeria declared independence.

According to Erik Bleich, multiculturalism in France faced stiff resistance in the educational sector, especially regarding recent Muslim arrivals from Algeria. Gatekeepers often warned that multiculturalism was a threat to the historic basis of French culture.

Jeremy Jennings finds three positions among elites regarding the question of reconciling traditional French Republican principles with multiculturalism. The traditionalists refuse to make any concessions and instead insist on clinging to the historic republican principles of "laïcité" and the secular state in which religion and ethnicity are always ignored. In the middle are modernising republicans who uphold republicanism but also accept some elements of cultural pluralism. Finally there are multiculturalist republicans who envision a pluralist conception of French identity and seek an appreciation of the positive values brought to France by the minority cultures.

A major attack on multiculturalism came in Stasi Report of 2003 which denounces "Islamism" as deeply opposed to the mainstream interpretations of French culture. It is portrayed as a dangerous political agenda that will create a major obstacle for Muslims to comply with French secularism or "laïcité ". Murat Akan, however, argues that the Stasi Report and the new regulations against the hijab and religious symbols in the schools must be set against gestures toward multiculturalism, such as the creation of Muslim schools under contract with the government.

=== Germany ===
In October 2010, Angela Merkel told a meeting of younger members of her Christian Democratic Union (CDU) party at Potsdam, near Berlin, that attempts to build a multicultural society in Germany had "utterly failed", stating: "The concept that we are now living side by side and are happy about it does not work". She continued to say that immigrants should integrate and adopt Germany's culture and values. This has added to a growing debate within Germany on the levels of immigration, its effect on Germany and the degree to which middle eastern immigrants have integrated into German society. In 2015, Merkel again criticized multiculturalism on the grounds that it leads to parallel societies.

The Ahmadiyya Muslim Community of Germany is the first Muslim group to have been granted "corporation under public law status", putting the community on par with the major Christian churches and Jewish communities of Germany.

=== Luxembourg ===
Luxembourg has one of the highest foreign-born populations in Europe, foreigners account for nearly half of the country's total population. The majority of foreigners are from: Belgium, France, Italy, Germany, and Portugal. In total, 170 different nationalities make up the population of Luxembourg, out of this; 86% are of European descent. The official languages of Luxembourg are German, French, and Luxembourgish all of which are supported in the Luxembourg government and education system. In 2005, Luxembourg officially promoted and implemented the objectives of the UNESCO Convention on the Protection and Promotion of the Diversity of Cultural Expressions. This Convention affirms multicultural policies in Luxembourg and creates political awareness of cultural diversity.

=== Netherlands ===
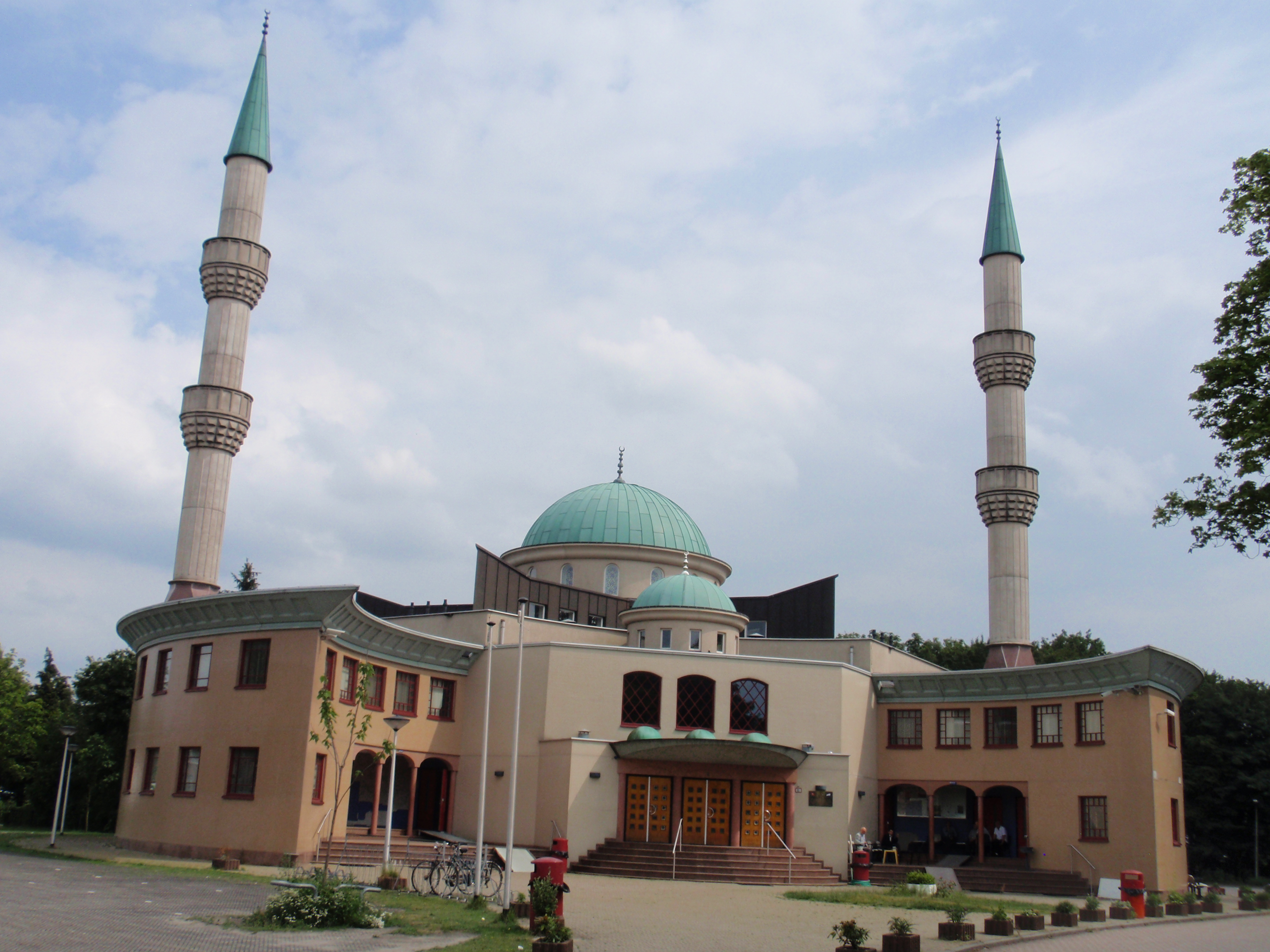
Süleymanìye Mosque in Tilburg, built in 2001

Multiculturalism in the Netherlands began with major increases in immigration to the Netherlands during the mid-1950s and 1960s. As a consequence, an official national policy of multiculturalism was adopted in the early-1980s. Different groups could themselves determine religious and cultural matters, while state authorities would handle matters of housing and work policy.

In the 1990s, the public debate were generally optimistic on immigration and the prevailing view was that a multicultural policy would reduce the social economic disparities over time.

This policy subsequently gave way to more assimilationist policies in the 1990s and post-electoral surveys uniformly showed from 1994 onwards that a majority preferred that immigrants assimilated rather than retained the culture of their country of origin.

Following the September 11 attacks in the United States and the murders of Pim Fortuyn (in 2002) and Theo van Gogh (in 2004), there was increased political debate on the role of multiculturalism in the Netherlands.

Lord Sacks, Chief Rabbi of the United Hebrew Congregations of the Commonwealth, made a distinction between tolerance and multiculturalism, citing the Netherlands as a tolerant, rather than multicultural, society. In June 2011, the First Rutte cabinet said the Netherlands would turn away from multiculturalism: "Dutch culture, norms and values must be dominant" Minister Donner said.

=== Romania ===
Since Antiquity, Romania has hosted many religious and ethnic groups, besides Romanians, including Roma people, Hungarians, Germans, Turks, Greeks, Tatars, Slovaks, Serbs, Jews and others. During WW2 and Communism, most of these ethnic groups chose to emigrate to other countries. However, since the 1990s, Romania has received a growing number of immigrants and refugees, most of them from the Arab world, Asia or Africa. Immigration is expected to increase in the future, as large numbers of Romanian workers leave the country and are being replaced by foreigners.

=== Russian Federation ===
The idea of multiculturalism in Russia is closely linked to the territory and the Soviet concept of "nationality". The Federation is divided into a series of republics where each ethnic group has preponderance in deciding the laws that affect that republic. A distinction is then made between Rossiyane (Russian citizens) and Russkie (ethnic Russians).

Each people within their territories has the right to practice their customs and traditions and even to impose their own laws, as is the case in Chechnya, as long as they do not violate federal and constitutional laws of the Russian Federation.

=== Scandinavia ===
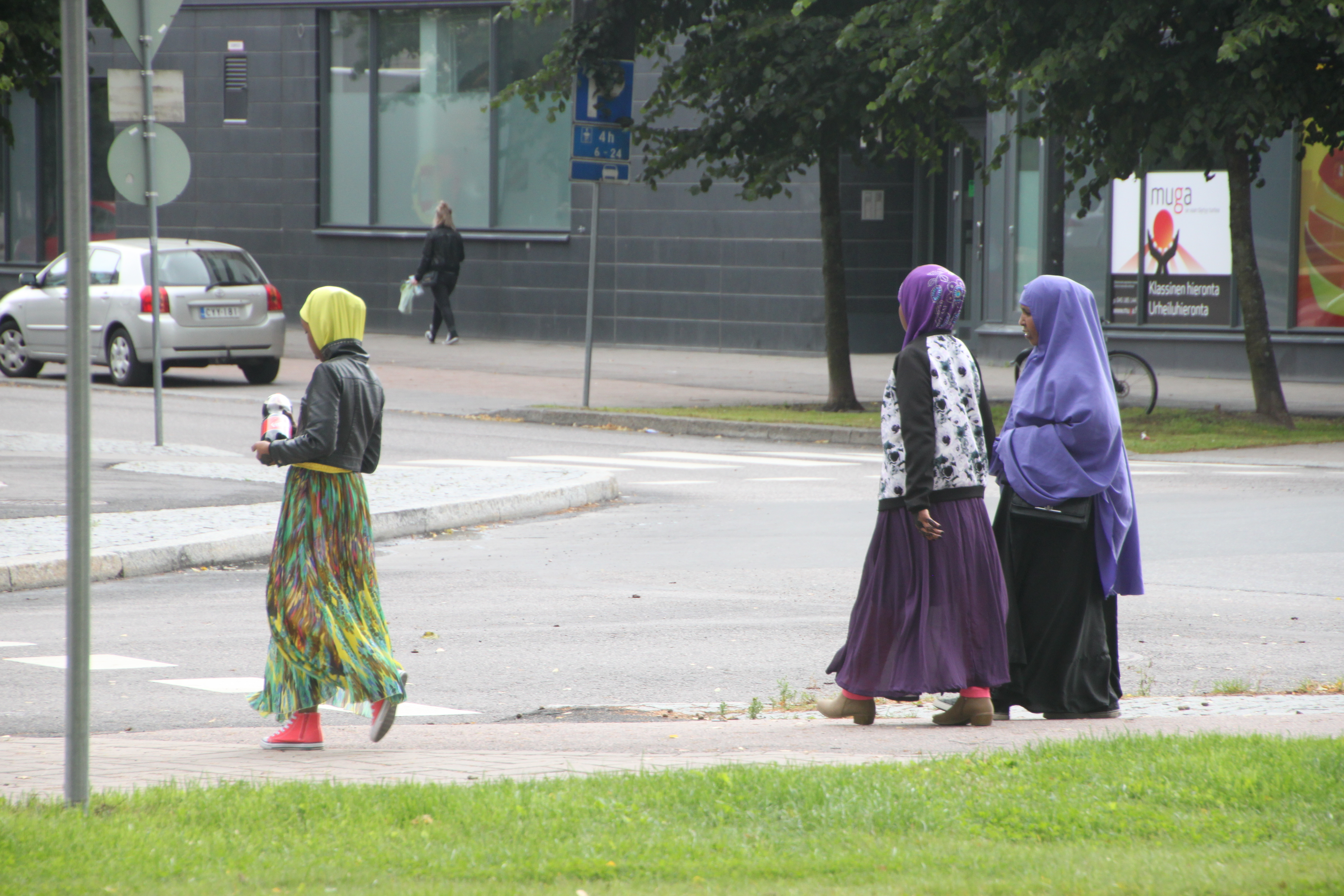
The Vuosaari district in Helsinki, Finland, is highly multicultural.

Multiculturalism in Scandinavia has centered on discussions about marriage, dress, religious schools, Muslim funeral rites and gender equality. Forced marriages have been widely debated in Denmark, Sweden and Norway but the countries differ in policy and responses by authorities.

Sweden has the most permissive policies while Denmark the most restrictive ones.

==== Denmark ====
In 2001, Denmark, a liberal-conservative coalition government with the support of the Danish People's Party which instituted less pluralistic policy, geared more towards assimilation.

A 2018 study found that increases in local ethnic diversity in Denmark caused "rightward shifts in election outcomes by shifting electoral support away from traditional "big government" left‐wing parties and towards anti‐immigrant nationalist parties."

For decades, Danish immigration policy was built upon the belief that, with support, immigrants and their descendants would eventually reach the same levels of education as Danes. In a 2019 report, the Danish Immigration Service and the Ministry of Education found this to be false. The report found that, while the second-generation immigrants without a Western background do better than their parents, the same is not true for third-generation immigrants. One of the reasons given was that second-generation immigrants may marry someone from their country of origin, which may cause Danish not to be spoken at home, which would put the children at a disadvantage in school. Thereby, the process of integrating has to start from the beginning for each generation.

==== Norway ====
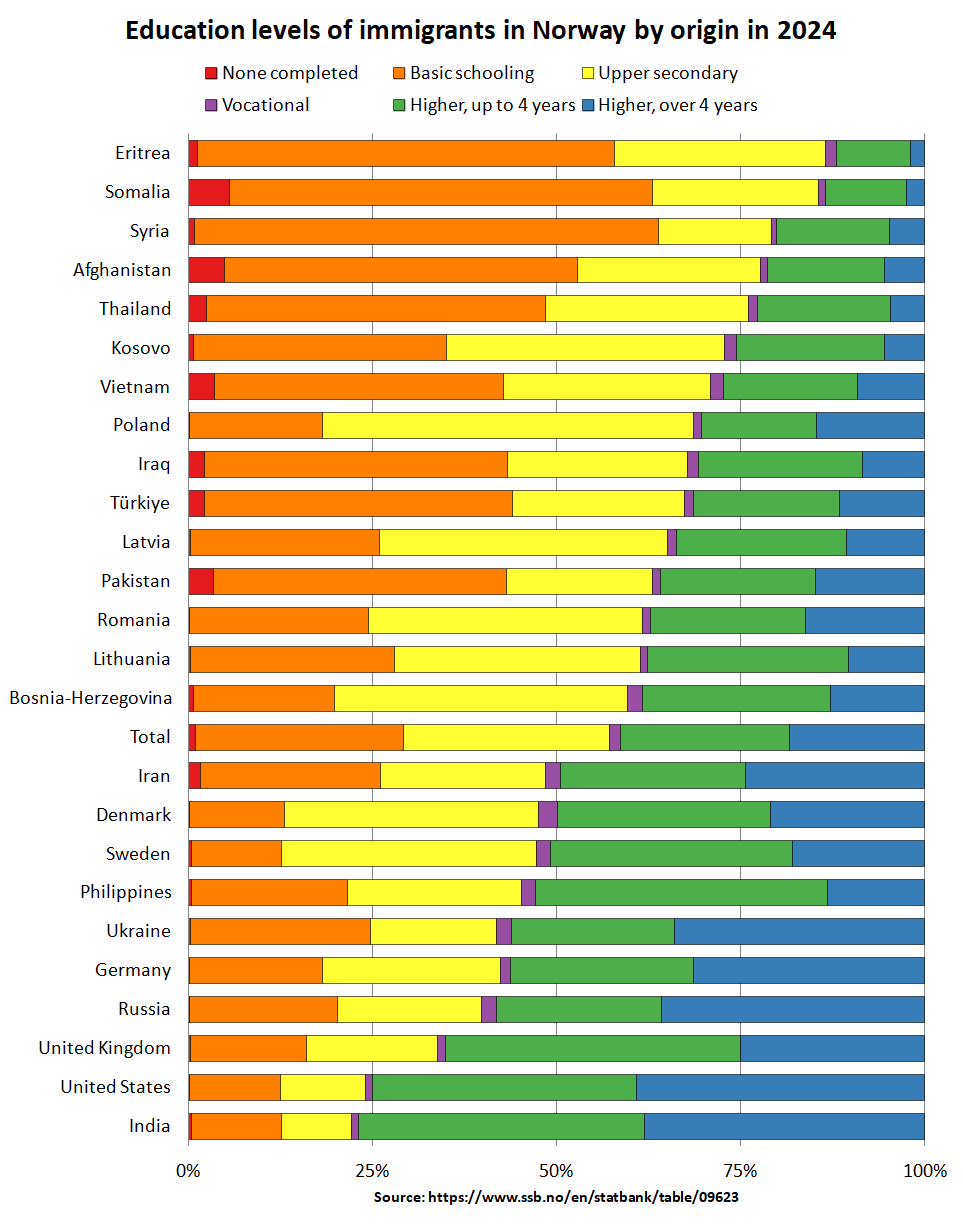
Educational attainment of migrants in Norway in 2024

Apart from citizens of Nordic countries, all foreigners must apply for permanent residency in order to live and work in Norway. In 2017, the Norwegian immigrant population was made up of: citizens of EU and EEA countries (41.2%); citizens of Asian countries, including Turkey (32.4%); citizens of African countries (13.7%); and citizens of non-EU/EEA European, North American, South American and Oceanian countries (12.7%).

In 2015, during the European migrant crisis, a total of 31,145 asylum seekers, most of whom came from Afghanistan and Syria, crossed the Norwegian border. In 2016, the number of asylum seekers dramatically reduced by almost 90%, with 3460 asylum seekers coming to Norway. This was partly due to the stricter border control across Europe, including an agreement between the EU and Turkey.

As of September 2019, 15 foreign residents who had travelled from Norway to Syria or Iraq to join the Islamic State have had their residence permits revoked.

The Progress Party has named the reduction of high levels of immigration from non-European countries one of their goals:

"Immigration from countries outside the EEA must be strictly enforced to ensure a successful integration. It can not be accepted that fundamental Western values and human rights are set aside by cultures and attitudes that certain groups of immigrants bring with them to Norway."

An extreme form of opposition to immigration in Norway were the 22/7 attacks carried out by the terrorist Anders Behring Breivik on 22 July 2011. He killed 8 people by bombing government buildings in Oslo and massacred 69 young people at a youth summer camp held by the Labour Party, who were in power at the time. He blamed the party for the high level of Muslim immigration and accused it of "promoting multiculturalism".

==== Sweden ====
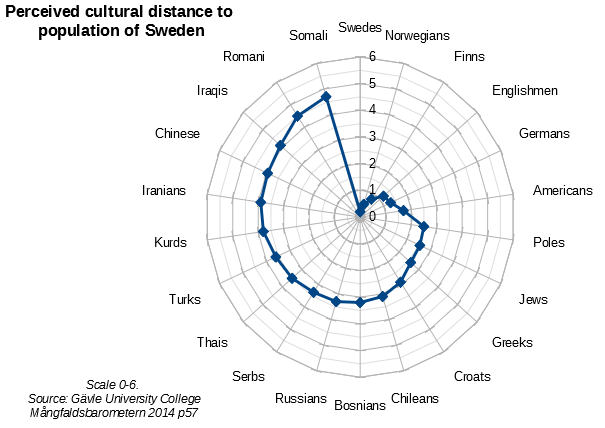
Source: Gävle University College

Sweden has from the early 1970s experienced a greater share of non-Western immigration than the other Scandinavian countries, which consequently have placed multiculturalism on the political agenda for a longer period of time.

Sweden was the first country to adopt an official policy of multiculturalism in Europe. On 14 May 1975, a unanimous Swedish parliament passed an act on a new multiculturalist immigrant and ethnic minority policy put forward by the social democratic government, that explicitly rejected the ideal ethnic homogeneity and the policy of assimilation. The three main principles of the new policy were equality, partnership and freedom of choice. The explicit policy aim of the freedom of choice principle was to create the opportunity for minority groups in Sweden to retain their own languages and cultures. From the mid-1970s, the goal of enabling the preservation of minorities and creating a positive attitude towards the new officially endorsed multicultural society among the majority population became incorporated into the Swedish constitution as well as cultural, educational and media policies. Despite the anti-multiculturalist protestations of the Sweden Democrats, multiculturalism remains official policy in Sweden.

A 2008 study which involved questionnaires sent to 5,000 people, showed that less than a quarter of the respondents (23%) wanted to live in areas characterised by cultural, ethnic and social diversity.

A 2014 study published by Gävle University College showed that 38% of the population never interacted with anyone from Africa and 20% never interacted with any non-Europeans. The study concluded that while physical distance to the country of origin, also religion and other cultural expressions are significant for the perception of cultural familiarity. In general, peoples with Christianity as the dominant religion were perceived to be culturally closer than peoples from Muslim countries.

A 2017 study by Lund University also found that social trust was lower among people in regions with high levels of past non-Nordic immigration than among people in regions with low levels of past immigration. The erosive effect on trust was more pronounced for immigration from culturally distant countries.

=== Serbia ===
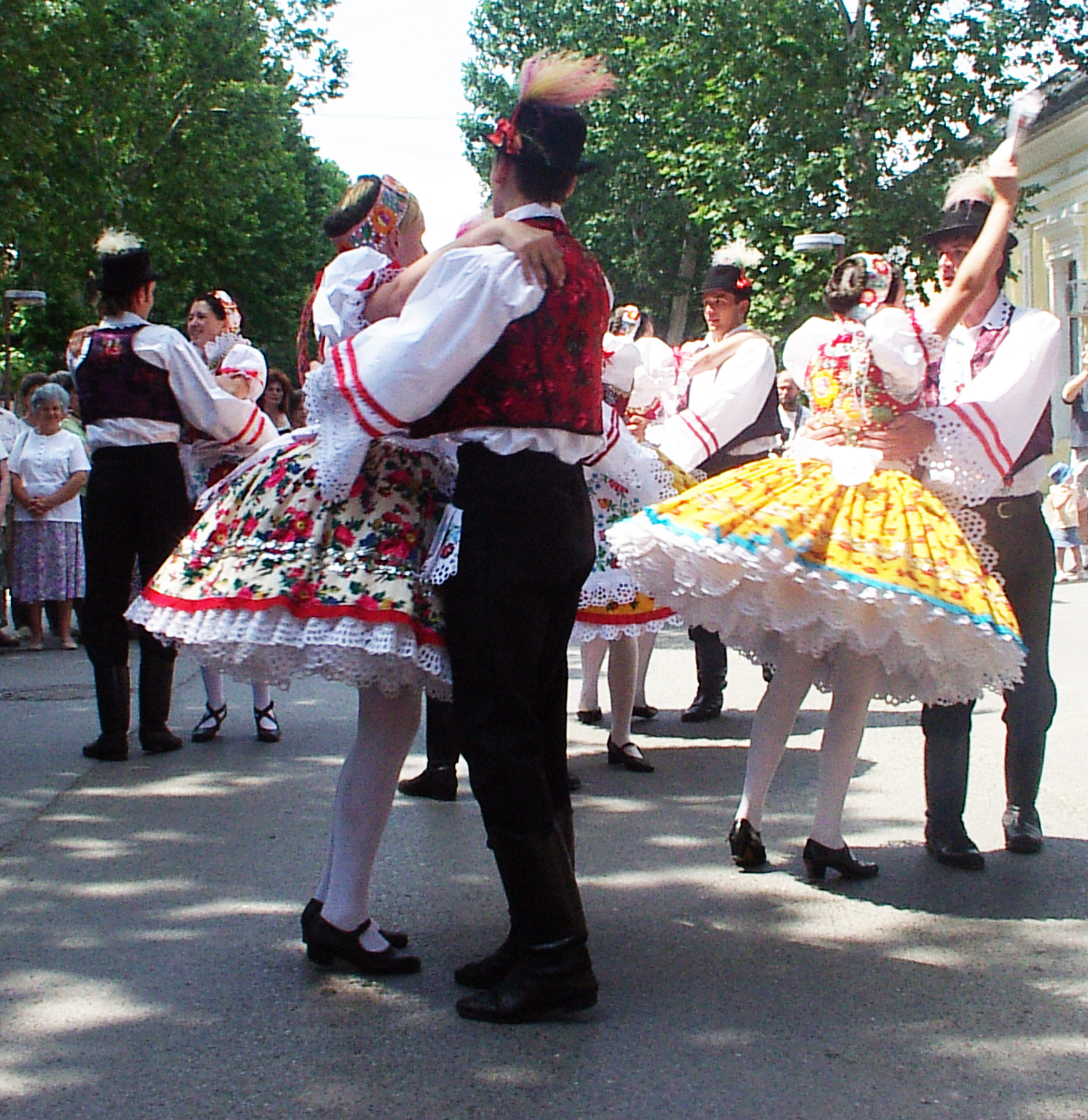
Csárdás traditional Hungarian folk dance in Doroslovo

In Serbia, there are 19 officially recognised ethnic groups with a status of national minorities. Vojvodina is an autonomous province of Serbia, located in the northern part of the country. It has a multiethnic and multicultural identity; there are more than 26 ethnic groups in the province, which has six official languages. Largest ethnic groups in Vojvodina are Serbs (67%), Hungarians (13%), Slovaks, Croats, Romani, Romanians, Montenegrins, Bunjevci, Bosniaks, Rusyns. The Chinese and Arabs, are the only two significant immigrant minorities in Serbia.

Radio Television of Vojvodina broadcasts program in ten local languages. The project by the Government of AP Vojvodina titled "Promotion of Multiculturalism and Tolerance in Vojvodina", whose primary goal is to foster the cultural diversity and develop the atmosphere of interethnic tolerance among the citizens of Vojvodina, has been successfully implemented since 2005. Serbia is continually working on improving its relationship and inclusion of minorities in its effort to gain full accession to the European Union. Serbia has initiated talks through Stabilisation and Association Agreement on 7 November 2007.

=== United Kingdom ===
Multicultural policies were adopted by local administrations from the 1970s and 1980s onwards. In 1997, the newly elected Labour government committed to a multiculturalist approach at a national level, but after 2001, there was something of a backlash, led by centre-left commentators such as David Goodhart and Trevor Phillips. The government then embraced a policy of community cohesion instead. In 2011, Conservative Prime Minister David Cameron said in a speech that "state multiculturalism has failed". Critics argue that analyses which view society as 'too diverse' for social democracy and cohesion have "performative" effects regarding legitimate racism towards those classed as immigrants. Others, however, like author Ed West, criticize the notion that the United Kingdom is or should be a multicultural society in the first place and that the project of diversity is misguided.

=== Yugoslavia ===
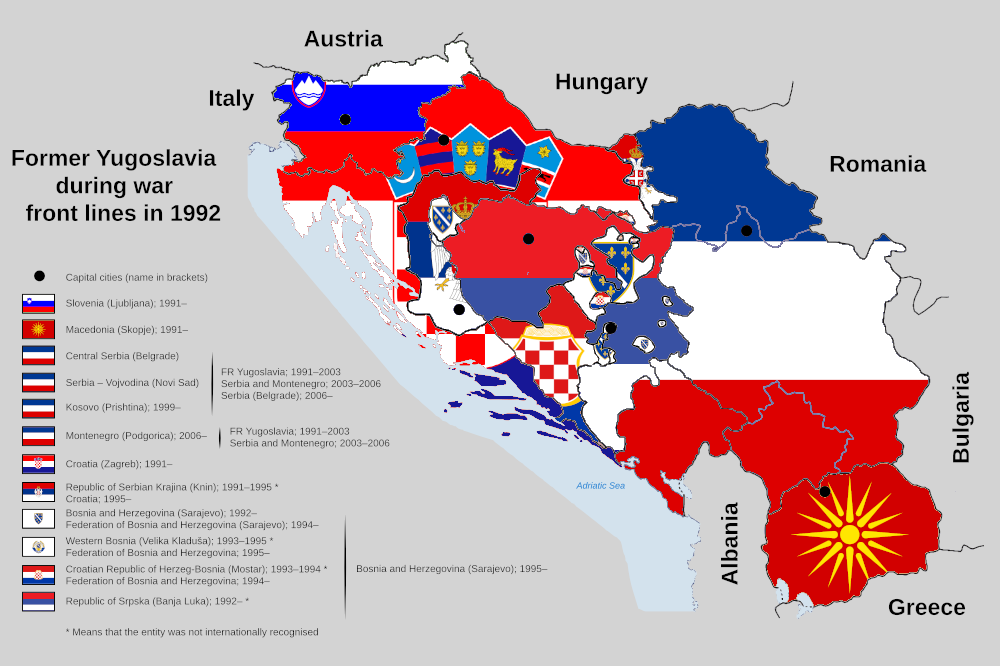
Former Yugoslavia during the Yugoslav Wars in 1992

Before the breakup of Yugoslavia and Yugoslav Wars, Yugoslavia was multicultural.

== Asia ==
=== India ===
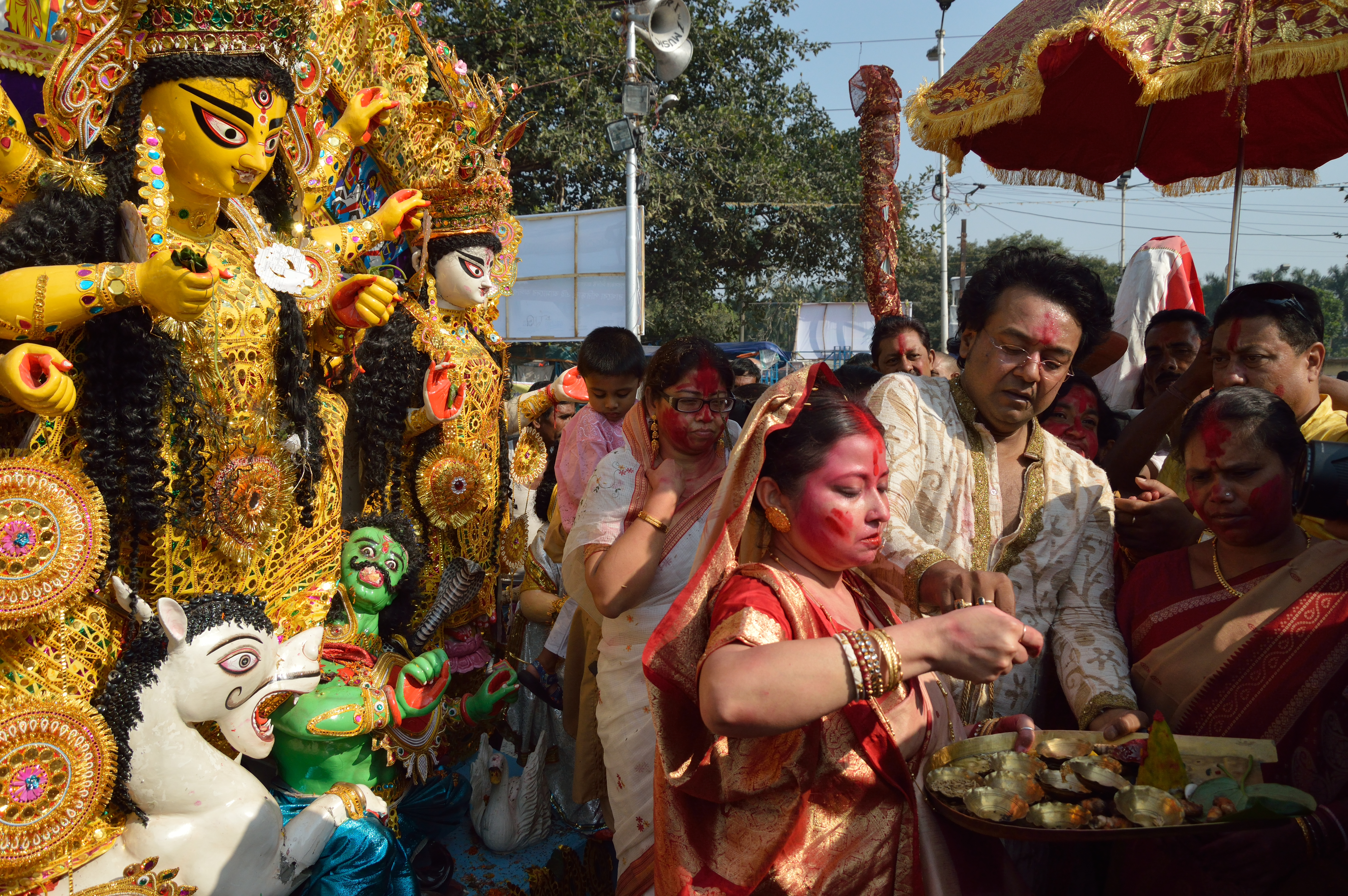
The Durga Puja celebrated in Kolkata

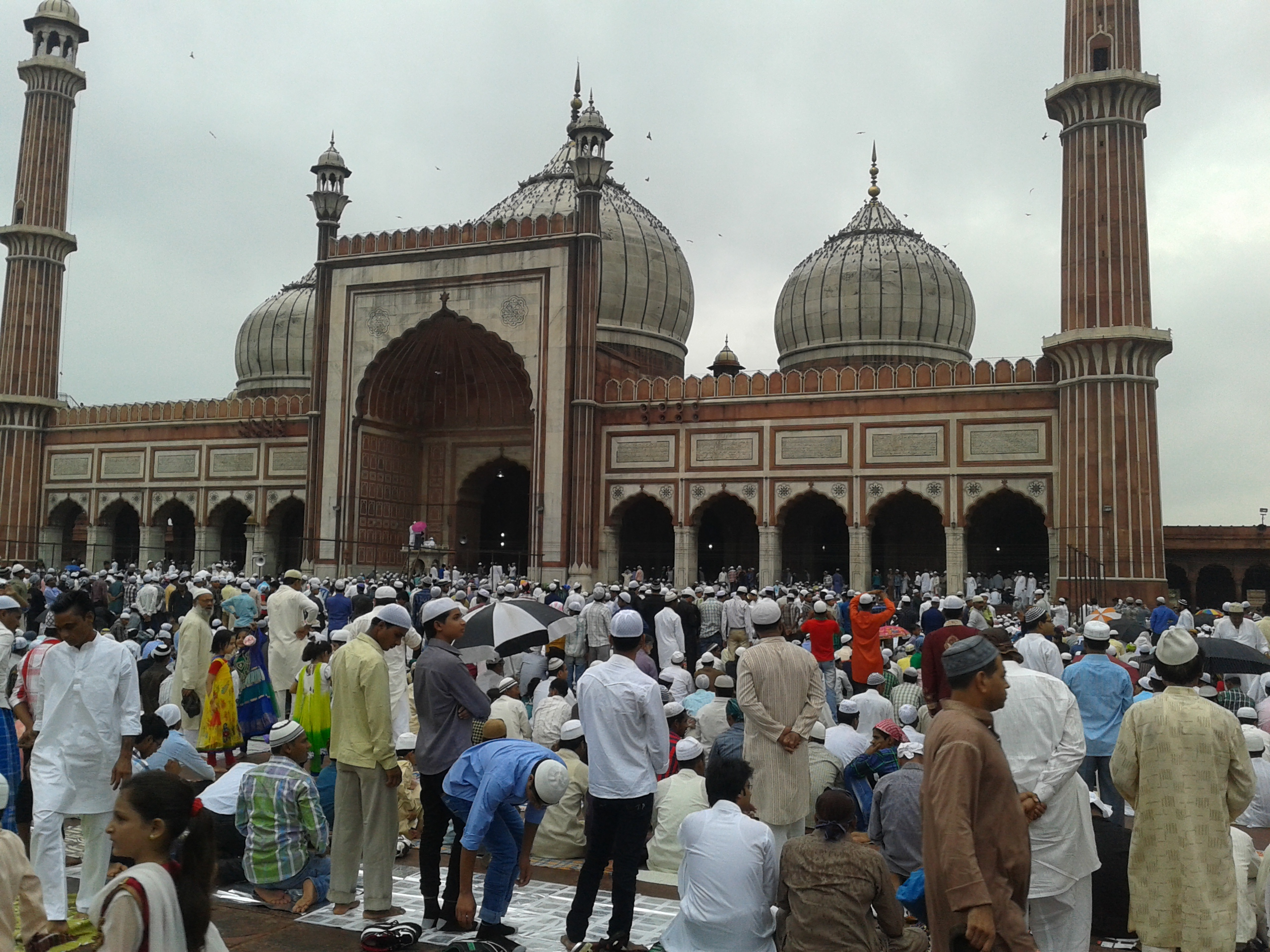
Jama Masjid, Delhi, one of the largest mosques in India

According to the 1961 Census of India, there are 1652 indigenous languages in the country. The culture of India has been shaped by its long history, unique geography and diverse demography. India's languages, religions, dance, music, architecture and customs differ from place to place within the country, but nevertheless possess a commonality. The culture of India is an amalgamation of these diverse sub-cultures spread all over the Indian subcontinent and traditions that are several millennia old. The prevalent Indian caste system describes the social stratification and social restrictions in the Indian subcontinent, in which social classes are defined by thousands of endogamous hereditary groups, often termed jātis or castes.

Religiously, Hindus form the majority, followed by Muslims. The statistics are: Hindu (79.8%), Muslim (14.2%), Christian (2.3%), Sikh (1.7%), Buddhist (0.7%), Jain (0.4%), Unaffiliated (0.23%), Baháʼís, Jews, Zoroastrians, and others (0.65%). Linguistically, the two main language families in India are Indo-Aryan (a branch of Indo-European) and Dravidian. In India's northeast, people speaking Sino-Tibetan group of languages such as Meitei (Meitei-lon) and Bodo recognized by the Indian constitution and Austroasiatic languages are commonly found. India (officially) follows a three-language policy. Hindi (spoken in the form of Hindustani) is the official federal language, English has the federal status of associate/subsidiary official language and each state has its own state official language (in the Hindi sprachraum, this reduces to bilingualism). Further, India does not have any national language. The Republic of India's state boundaries are largely drawn based on linguistic groups; this decision led to the preservation and continuation of local ethno-linguistic sub-cultures, except for the Hindi sprachraum which is itself divided into many states. Thus, most states differ from one another in language, culture, cuisine, clothing, literary style, architecture, music and festivities.

India has encountered religiously motivated violence, such as the Moplah Riots, the Bombay riots, the 1984 Sikh genocide, the 1990 Exodus of Kashmiri Hindus, the 2002 Gujarat riots, the 2008 Mumbai attacks, the 2012 Assam violence, the 2013 Muzaffarnagar riots, and the 2020 Delhi riots. This has resulted from traditionally disadvantaged communities in public employment such as the policing of the same locality, apprehension of owners in giving properties for sale or rent and of society in accepting inter-marriages.

==== Cultural minorities in India ====
The Indian constitution requires the various state-run institutions to provide quotas for minorities, which give these cultural minorities equal opportunities, as well as a forum through which they can actively participate in the institutions of the dominant culture. Indian polity after the 1990s has been marked by a shift from secular principles to a landscape that is dominated by Hindutva; the Bharatiya Janata Party has used this rhetoric by reconstructing Hinduism and bartering it under the guise of Indian nationalism. However, the rise of Hindutva, a Hindu nationalist ideology, has impinged on the rights of cultural minorities. This can be seen in the large scale violence against cultural minorities, votebank politics, and the promotion of issues faced by the larger religious communities over those faced by the backward groups in religious minorities.

==== Scheduled Castes (SC) and Scheduled Tribes (ST) and Other Backward Castes (OBC) ====
Scheduled Castes and Scheduled Tribes are constitutionally recognized terms in India and constitute approximately 25% of the Indian population. Moreover more than 40 percent of India's population belongs to the Other Backward Class as per the National Sample Survey Office or the NSSO which is a government organization for conducting surveys in India. So the total size of the lower castes in India is estimated to be around 70 percent of the country's population whereas the upper caste make up around 18 percent of the population. These groups have been provided with reservations that constitutionally guarantee them representation in governmental institutions, a mandate suggested by the Mandal Commission. The Indian constitution also provides SC's and ST's with protective measures that ensure equality, which is the main issue faced by members of both communities. However, while scheduled castes have turned into important political communities that the state concerns itself about, scheduled tribes continue to be politically marginalized.

=== Indonesia ===
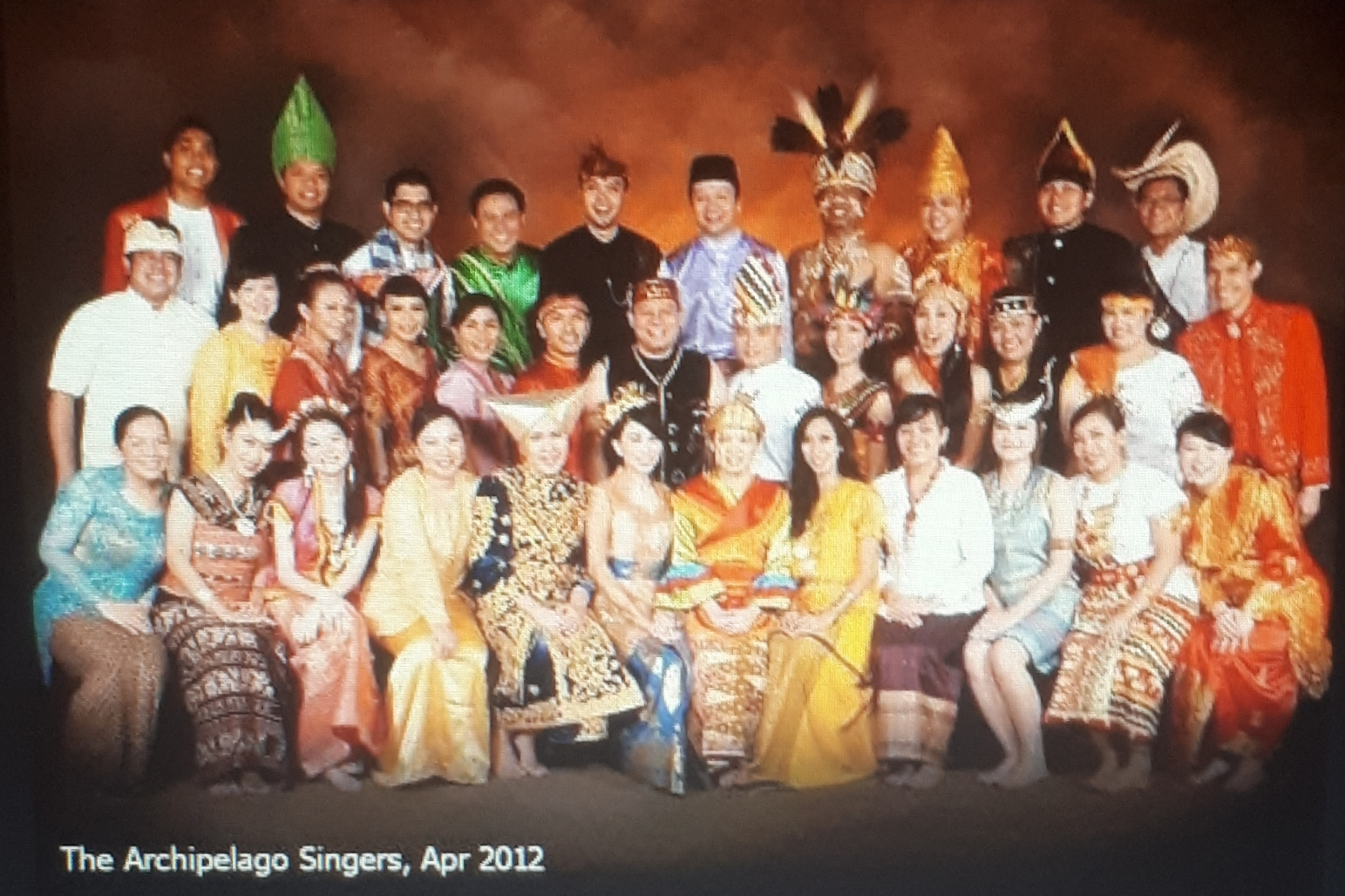
The Archipelago Singers, a choir group in Indonesia. Members are dressed in the various traditional attires of Indonesia’s ethnic groups.

Pluralism, diversity and multiculturalism is a daily fact of life in Indonesia. There are over 600 ethnic groups in Indonesia. 95% of those are of Native Indonesian ancestry. The Javanese are the largest ethnic group in Indonesia who make up nearly 42% of the total population. The Sundanese, Malay, and Madurese are the next largest groups in the country. There are also more than 700 living languages spoken in Indonesia and although predominantly Muslim the country also has large Christian and Hindu populations.

Indonesia's national motto, Bhinneka Tunggal Ika ("Unity in Diversity" lit. "many, yet one") enshrined in Pancasila the national ideology, articulates the diversity that shapes the country. The government nurtures and promotes the diversity of Indonesian local culture; adopting a pluralist approach.

Due to migration within Indonesia (as part of government transmigration programs or otherwise), there are significant populations of ethnic groups who reside outside of their traditional regions. The Javanese for example, moved from their traditional homeland in Java to the other parts of the archipelago. The expansion of the Javanese and their influence throughout Indonesia has raised the issue of Javanization, although Minangkabau, Malay, Madurese, Bugis and Makassar people, as a result of their merantau (migrating) culture are also quite widely distributed throughout the Indonesian archipelago, while Chinese Indonesians can be found in most urban areas. Because of urbanization, major Indonesian cities such as Greater Jakarta, Surabaya, Bandung, Palembang, Medan and Makassar have attracted large numbers of Indonesians from various ethnic, cultural and religious backgrounds. Jakarta in particular has almost all Indonesian ethnic groups represented.

However, this transmigration program and close interactions between people of different cultural backgrounds caused socio-cultural problems, as the inter-ethnics interactions have not always been conducted harmoniously. After the fall of Suharto in 1998 into the 2000s, a number of inter-ethnic and inter-religious clashes erupted in Indonesia. Like the clashes between native Dayak tribes against Madurese migrants in Kalimantan during the Sanggau Ledo riots in 1996–1997, the Sambas riots in 1999, and the Sampit conflict in 2001. There were also clashes between Muslims and Christians, such as violence erupted in Poso between 1998 and into 2000, and violences in Maluku between 1999 and into 2002. Nevertheless, Indonesia today still struggles and has managed to maintain unity and inter-cultural harmony, through a national adherence of pro-pluralism policy of Pancasila; promoted and enforced by the government and its people.

Chinese Indonesians are the largest foreign-origin minority that has resided in Indonesia for generations. Despite centuries of acculturation with native Indonesians, because of their disproportionate influence on Indonesian economy, and alleged question of national loyalty, Chinese Indonesians have suffered discrimination. The Suharto Orde Baru or New Order adopted a forced assimilation policy; which indicated that Chinese cultural elements were unacceptable. Chinese Indonesians were forced to adopt Indonesian-sounding names, and the use of Chinese culture and language was banned. The violence targeting Chinese Indonesians erupted during riots in 1998. As the looting and destruction took place, a number of Chinese Indonesians, as well as looters, were killed. The Chinese Indonesians were treated as the scapegoat of 1997 Asian financial crisis, a result of ongoing discrimination and segregation policies enforced during Suharto's New Order regime. Soon after the fourth Indonesian President, Abdurrahman Wahid came into power in 1999, he quickly abolished some of the discriminatory laws in efforts to promote acceptance and to improve inter-racial relationships, such as abolishing the ban on Chinese culture; allowing Chinese traditions to be practised freely. Two years later President Megawati Sukarnoputri declared that the Chinese New Year (Imlek) would be marked as a national holiday from 2003. Tense incidents however have included attacks on Chinese temples and Indonesian politician Basuki Tjahaja Purnama being given a two year prison sentence for blasphemy due to comments he made to his supporters in September 2016.

=== Kazakhstan ===
There are sizeable populations of ethnic Kazakhs, Russians, Uzbeks, Ukrainians, Uighurs, Tatars, Germans and more in Kazakhstan. Kazakhstan was one of a few countries in post-Soviet territories that avoided interethnic clashes and conflicts in the period of USSR's final crisis and its eventual breakup. In 1995, Kazakhstan created the Assembly of People of Kazakhstan, an advisory body designed to represent the country's ethnic minorities. However, recent ethnic clashes and discrimination have been reported for groups such as Christians, ultraconservative Muslims, ethnic Dungans, Chechens, Tajiks, and LGBT people.

=== Malaysia ===
Malaysia is a multiethnic country, with Malays making up the majority, close to 58% of the population. About 25% of the population are Malaysians of Chinese descent. Malaysians of Indian descent comprise about 7% of the population. The remaining 10% comprises:

- Native East Malaysians, namely Bajau, Bruneian, Bidayuh, Dusun, Iban, Kadazan, Kedayan, Melanau, Orang Ulu, Sarawakian Malays, etc.
- Other native tribes of Peninsular Malaysia, such as the Orang Asli and Siamese people, and
- Non-native tribes of Peninsular Malaysia such as the Chettiars, the Peranakan and the Portuguese.

The Malaysian New Economic Policy or NEP serves as a form of "racial equalization" in the view of the Malay-controlled government. It promotes structural changes in various aspects of life from education to economic to social integration. Established after the 13 May racial riots of 1969, it sought to address the "significant imbalance" in the economic sphere where the minority especially the Chinese population had substantial control over commercial activity in the country. Critics of this policy has called it synonymous to racial discrimination and synonymous to Apartheid.

The Malay Peninsula has a long history of international trade contacts, influencing its ethnic and religious composition. Predominantly Malays before the 18th century, the ethnic composition changed dramatically when the British introduced new industries, and imported Chinese and Indian labor. Several regions in the then British Malaya such as Penang, Malacca and Singapore became Chinese dominated. Until the riots 1969, co-existence between the three ethnicities (and other minor groups) was largely peaceful, although the three main racial groups for the most part lived in separate communities – the Malays in the villages, the Chinese in the urban areas, and the Indians in the towns and plantation. More Malays however have moved into the cities since the 1970s, and the proportion of the non-Malays have been decreasing continually, especially the Chinese, due in large part to lower birth-rate and emigration as a result of institutionalized discrimination.

Preceding independence of the Federation of Malaya, a social contract was negotiated as the basis of a new society. The contract as reflected in the 1957 Malayan Constitution and the 1963 Malaysian Constitution states that the immigrant groups are granted citizenship, and Malays' special rights are guaranteed. This is often referred to the Bumiputra policy.

These pluralist policies have come under pressure from racialist Malay parties, who oppose perceived subversion of Malay rights. The issue is sometimes related to the controversial status of religious freedom in Malaysia.

=== Singapore ===
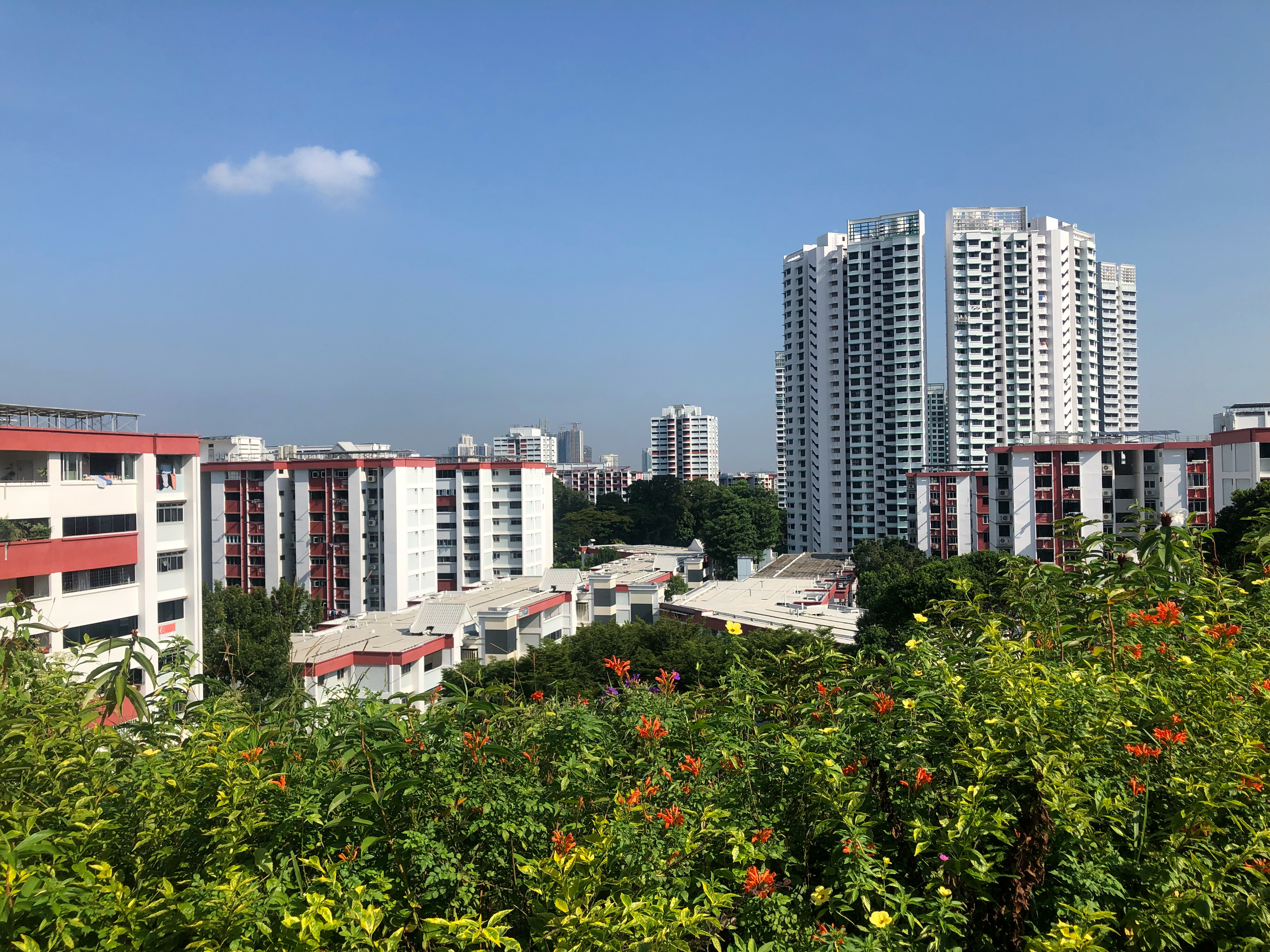
High density public housing in Singapore, which are a common sight in the country, consists of different ethnic groups living together.

Due to historical immigration trends, Singapore has a Chinese majority population with significant minority populations of Malays and Indians (predominantly Tamils). Other prominent smaller groups include Peranakans, Arabs, Armenians, Eurasians, Europeans, Americans, and Canadians. Besides English, Singapore recognizes three other languages—Malay, Mandarin Chinese and Tamil. English was established as the medium of instruction in schools during the 1960s and 1970s and is the language of trade and government while the other three languages are taught as second languages ("mother tongues"). Besides being a multilingual country, Singapore also acknowledges festivals celebrated by the three main ethnic communities.

Under the Raffles Plan of Singapore, the city was divided into ethnic enclaves such as Geylang, Chinatown, and Little India. Housing in Singapore is governed by the Ethnic Integration Policy, which ensures an even ethnic distribution throughout Singapore. A similar policy exists in politics as all Group Representation Constituencies are required to field at least one candidate from an ethnic minority.

Today, such ethnic enclaves has mostly been eliminated, due to the contemporary Singapore's government policy to encourage further ethnic integration between the different races of Singapore. A prominent example is its public housing system. Unlike other countries, public housing is not ostracised by a wide majority of the population and its government, and acts as a necessary and vital measure to provide immaculate and safe housing surrounded by public amenities at affordable prices, especially during its rapid development and industrialisation in the early years of independence. It is also meant to foster social cohesion between the social classes and races of Singapore, and prevent neglected areas or districts and ethnic enclaves from developing – known as the Ethnic Integration Policy (EIP). As such, it is considered a unique part of Singaporean culture, being commonly associated with the country.

=== South Korea ===
South Korea remains a relatively homogenous country ethnically, linguistically, and culturally. Foreigners, expatriates, and immigrants are often rejected by the mainstream South Korean society and face discrimination. This can be seen as a result of World War II where the first noteworthy wave of multiculturalism between American servicemen and Korean women occurred. South Korea has been long regarded as an ethnic homogeneous country, therefore, the rise in mixed-race children was seen as a new phenomenon. Before the 1990s, the term honhyeol was commonly used to identify multiracial individuals in Korea – primarily in relation to the children of Korean women and American servicemen; this common term strengthened the association of multiracial people with a sense of alienation, rather than promoting cultural diversity within Korea. Not only did this term effectively discriminate against mixed-race Koreans but it also made a clear distinction between native Koreans and mixed-race Koreans.

Han Geon-Soo 2007 notes the increased use of the word "multiculturalism" in South Korea: "As the increase of foreign migrants in [South] Korea transforms a single-ethnic homogeneous [South] Korean society into multiethnic and multicultural one, [the South] Korean government and the civil society pay close attention to multiculturalism as an alternative value to their policy and social movement." He argued, however, that "the current discourses and concerns on multiculturalism in [South] Korea" lacked "the constructive and analytical concepts for transforming a society".

The same year, Stephen Castles of the International Migration Institute argued:

"Korea no longer has to decide whether it wants to become a multicultural society. It made that decision years ago – perhaps unconsciously – when it decided to be a full participant in the emerging global economy. It confirmed that decision when it decided to actively recruit foreign migrants to meet the economic and demographic needs of a fast-growing society. Korea is faced by a different decision today: what type of multicultural society does it want to be?"

The Korea Times suggested in 2009 that South Korea was likely to become a multicultural society. In 2010, an opinion editorial written by Peter Underwood for the JoongAng Ilbo stated: "Media in [South] Korea is abuzz with the new era of multiculturalism. With more than one million foreigners in [South] Korea, 2 percent of the population comes from other cultures." He further opined:

"If you stay too long, Koreans become uncomfortable with you. [...] Having a two percent foreign population unquestionably causes ripples, but having one million temporary foreign residents does not make Korea a multicultural society. [...] In many ways, this homogeneity is one of Korea's greatest strengths. Shared values create harmony. Sacrifice for the nation is a given. Difficult and painful political and economic initiatives are endured without discussion or debate. It is easy to anticipate the needs and behavior of others. It is the cornerstone that has helped Korea survive adversity. But there is a downside, too. [...] Koreans are immersed in their culture and are thus blind to its characteristics and quirks. Examples of group think are everywhere. Because Koreans share values and views, they support decisions even when they are obviously bad. Multiculturalism will introduce contrasting views and challenge existing assumptions. While it will undermine the homogeneity, it will enrich Koreans with a better understanding of themselves."

In 2010, results from the Korean Identity Survey suggested that government programs promoting multiculturalism had seen some success with over 60% of Koreans supporting the idea a multicultural society. However, the same poll in 2015 showed that support of a multicultural society had dropped to 49.7% suggesting a possible return to ethnic exclusivism.

In October 2026, President Lee Jae Myung raised concerns about "reverse discrimination" in government support programs for multicultural families, questioning whether certain benefits unfairly favoured them over other households. His remarks prompted government reviews of such programs, including priority access to childcare and subsidized postpartum care. Migrant rights advocates criticized the remarks, cautioning that they could reinforce prejudice, deepen social divisions and portray multicultural families as undeserving of public assistance. The controversy also drew attention to the use of multicultural families as political tools in a society that officially promotes multiculturalism, particularly in debates over national identity, public resources and equity-based support measures. Advocates argued that repeated political disputes over benefits for multicultural families shifted attention away from the disadvantages they face and problems with the implementation of existing support programs, while potentially increasing public hostility toward them.

=== Turkey ===
Turkey is a country that straddles both Europe and Asia. It is home to several ethnic groups including Turkish, Arab, Armenian, Assyrian, Greek, Kurdish, and Jewish. There are cultural influences dating back to ancient Hellenic, Mediterranean, Semitic and Iranian civilizations which diffused and mingled in myriad ways over a period of centuries.

The Turkish migrant crisis (which is a part of the wider European migrant crisis) was a period during the 2010s characterised by a high number of people fleeing to Turkey, especially refugees fleeing the Syrian Civil War, and caused a backlash and anti-migrant sentiment in Turkish society.

== Africa ==
=== Cameroon ===
Officially known as the Republic of Cameroon, Cameroon is found in central Africa consisting of a diverse geographical and cultural area that makes it one of the most diverse countries known today. Ranging from mountains, deserts, and rainforests, to coast-lands and savanna grasslands, its diverse geography makes a large diverse population possible. This diverse geography resembles Africa as a whole and due to this, many people commonly label Cameroon as "Africa in Miniature".

==== Demographics and official languages ====
Before Cameroon's independence, it was under British and French colonial rule from 1916–1961. Upon gaining sovereignty, a major colonial influence was evident, having both English and French become the national language to roughly 25,000,000 Cameroonian residents. Apart from these two major languages, a new language consisting of a mixture of French, English, and Pidgin known as Frananglais gained popularity among Cameroonian residents.

==== Indigenous languages ====
Although these three languages are the most common in Cameroon, there are still approximately 273 indigenous languages being spoken throughout the country, making it not only culturally diverse but linguistically as well. Among those who speak these indigenous languages are people from Bantu, Sudanic, Baka, Wodaabe (or Mbororo) and even primitive hunter-gatherer groups known as Pygmies.

==== Indigenous peoples' rights ====
Although native to Cameroonian land, they faced constant discrimination much like other indigenous groups around the world. The United Nations General Assembly (UNGA) adopted the United Nations' Declaration on the Rights of Indigenous Peoples (UNDRIP) in 2007. What this allowed was the protection of land and resource rights and prevented others from exploiting or violating them. In 2016, a group of indigenous Baka and Bagyeli groups united to form Gbabandi. Gbabandi allowed these indigenous groups to have a form of representation and a declared list of requirements that people of Cameroon had to abide by. Among these requirements were guaranteed land rights, peoples' consent to the usage of their sacred land, traditional chiefs and the ability to participate in "local, regional, and national levels" of political and economic matters. As a result, this established a sense of justice and acknowledgment among indigenous groups in Cameroon and posed for future battles for indigenous peoples' rights.

=== Mauritius ===
Multiculturalism has been a characteristic feature of the island of Mauritius. This is mainly because of colonization that has been present from, the English, the French, and the Dutch. However, the Mauritian society includes people from many different ethnic and religious groups: Hindu, Muslim and Indo-Mauritians, Mauritian Creoles (of African and Malagasy descent), Buddhist and Roman Catholic Sino-Mauritians and Franco-Mauritians (descendants of the original French colonists). Mauritius has embraced intertwining of cultures from the origin of the country, and has coined the term fruit-salad, which is a much more appealing term in comparison to melting-pot showing that they were not forced to these cultures.

=== South Africa ===
South Africa is the fifth-most populous country and one of the most developed countries in Africa. South Africa also officially recognises 11 languages including English, making it third behind Bolivia and India in most official languages. The three most common languages are Zulu, Xhosa, and Afrikaans. Though South Africa's cultural traditions may decline as it becomes more and more Westernised due to its development, it is still known for its diverse culture.

== Oceania ==
=== Australia ===
The next country to adopt an official policy of multiculturalism after Canada was Australia, a country with similar immigration situations and similar policies – for example, the formation of the Special Broadcasting Service. The Australian Government retains multiculturalism in policy and as a defining aspect of modern Australia.

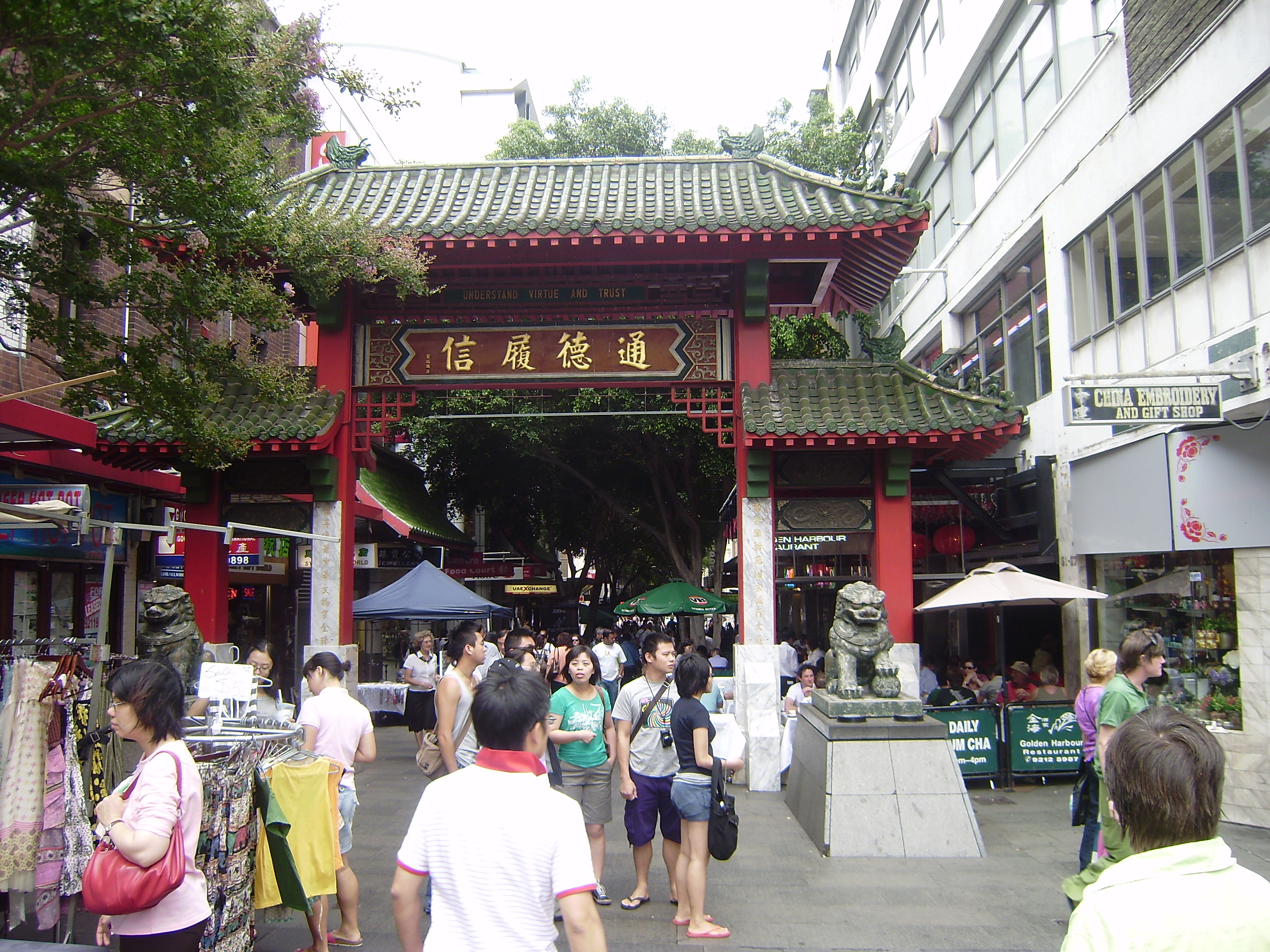
Sydney's Chinatown

The White Australia Policy was dismantled after World War II by various changes to immigration policy, although the official policy of multiculturalism was not formally introduced until 1972. The election of John Howard's Liberal-National Coalition government in 1996 was a major watershed for Australian multiculturalism. Howard had long been a critic of multiculturalism, releasing his One Australia policy in the late 1980s. A Practical Reference to Religious Diversity for Operational Police and Emergency Services, first published in 1999, was a publication of the Australasian Police Multicultural Advisory Bureau designed to offer guidance to police and emergency services personnel on how religious affiliation can affect their contact with the public. The first edition covered Buddhist, Hindu, Islamic, Jewish and Sikh faiths, with participation of representatives of the various religions. The second edition, published in 2002, added Christian, Aboriginal and Torres Strait Islander religions and the Baháʼí Faith to the list of religions.

Contact between people of different cultures in Australia has been characterised by tolerance and engagement, but have also occasionally resulted in conflict and rifts. Australia's diverse migrant communities have brought with them food, lifestyle and cultural practices, many of which have been absorbed into mainstream Australian culture.

Members of a multicultural community who are not of English-speaking Anglo-Australian, Anglo-Saxon or 'Anglo-Celtic' Australian background or not "assimilated" are often referred to in policy discourse as culturally and linguistically diverse (CALD), introduced in 1996 to replace non-English speaking background (NESB).

=== New Zealand ===
New Zealand is a sovereign Oceanic country that adopted its multicultural policies post World War II. The country used to have immigration policies similar to Australia's White Australia Policy and the United States Immigration Act of 1924, but it would later follow suit with Australia and Canada in the 1970s and adopt similar multicultural policies. The relaxation of migration led to an influx of new migration to New Zealand in the 1980s. This led to an increase of Asian and Pacific islander peoples on the island, and ultimately a more diverse European population. In 1985, the Law Commission Act was passed which required the New Zealand Law Commission to review laws while taking into account both the indigenous Māori of New Zealand and New Zealand's multicultural character. In 1987, New Zealand officially recognized the indigenous Māori language as a national language. The revitalization in the Māori language led to its immersion in schools and television broadcast.

In 2001, the New Zealand government opened an Office of Ethnic Affairs to advise its local governments on the advancement of ethnic diversity and affairs of its multicultural communities. Many landmarks on the island have both their Māori and English names officially recognized. Māori makes up 3.7% of the population's speaking language. A 2013 census of New Zealand's population showed that 74% of the population identifies ethnically as European, while the latter 15% majority identify as Māori. The remainder identify as Asian, Arab, African, Pacific Islander and Latin American.

=== Papua New Guinea ===
Papua New Guinea has one of the most heterogeneous indigenous populations in the world: there are several thousand separate communities, most with only a few hundred people. This Oceanian country is home to over eight million people that are divided into hundreds of different indigenous ethnic groups and cultures with over 820 different indigenous languages. A majority of the indigenous groups are Papuans who have ancestors that lived in New Guinea over ten thousand years ago. The latter majority are Austronesians whose ancestors arrived less than four thousand years ago. The island's population is also made up of many expatriate citizens from China, Australia, Indonesia, Europe and the Philippines. In 1975, the island population was found to be made up of 40,000 of these diverse expatriate citizens. Despite the large amount of culturally diverse locations on the island, the Kuk Early Agricultural Site is the only UNESCO World heritage location.

== See also ==
- Cosmopolitanism
- Cross-cultural
- Cross-cultural communication
- Cultural assimilation
- Cultural competence
- Cultural conflict
- Cultural homogenization
- Diversity (politics)
- Ethnic penalty
- Ethnocentrism
- Ethnocultural empathy
- Ethnopluralism
- Europeanism
- Global Centre for Pluralism (Canada)
- Hybridity
- Hyphenated American
- Immigration and crime
- Interculturalism
- Intercultural competence
- Intercultural relations
- Leitkultur
- List of countries ranked by ethnic and cultural diversity level
- Miscegenation
- Sociology of race and ethnic relations
- Multicultural art
- Multicultural education
- Multiculturalism and Islam
- Multikulti
- Multinational state
- National personal autonomy
- Parallel society
- Paradox of intolerance
- Pluriculturalism
- Plurinationalism
- Polyculturalism
- Polyethnicity
- Rainbow Nation
- Racial integration
- Sectarianism
- Syncretism
- The Society for the Study of the Multi-Ethnic Literature of the United States
- Transculturation
- Unity in diversity
- Xenocentrism
