= 1994 in literature =

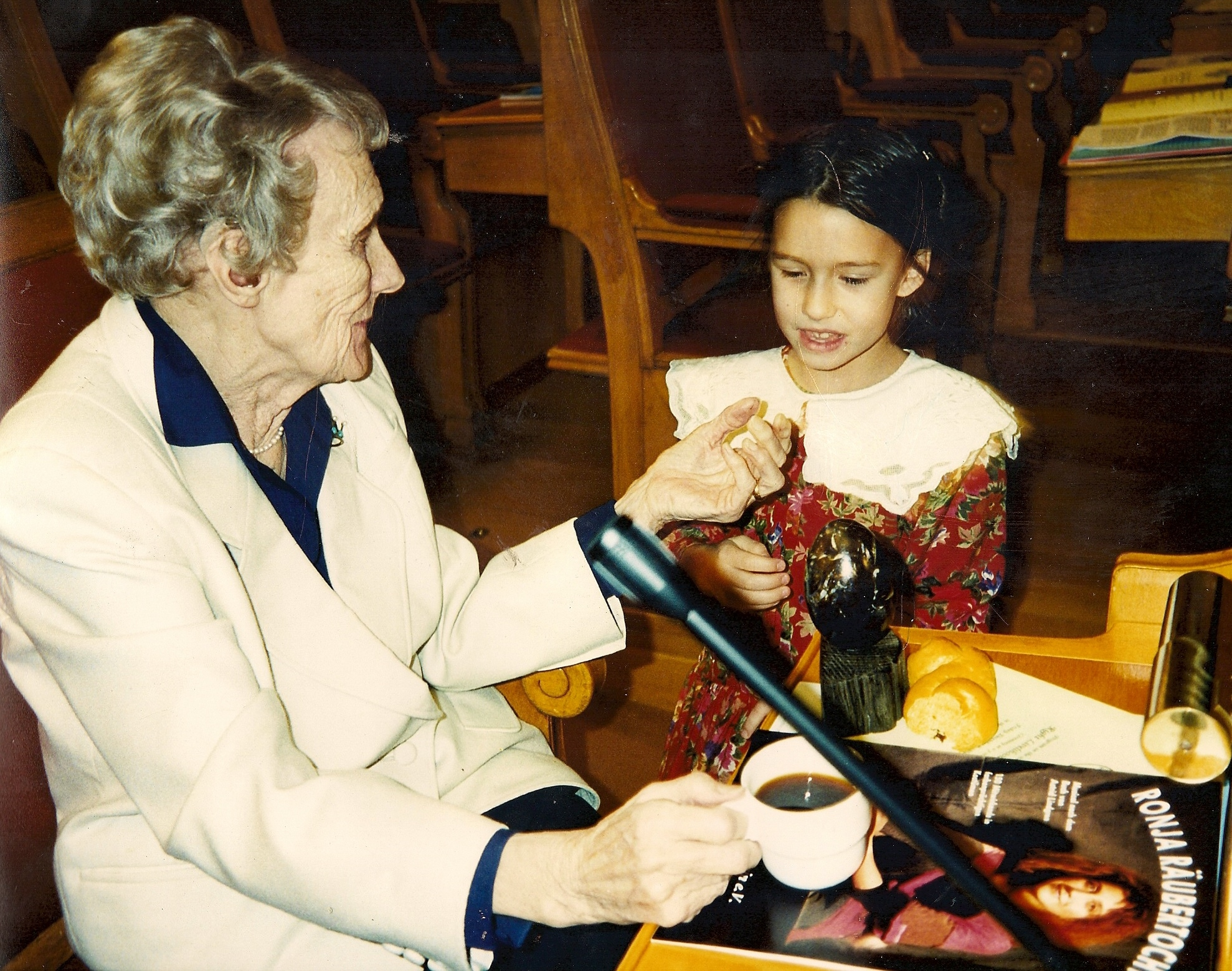
Astrid Lindgren receives the Right Livelihood Award in the Swedish Parliament in 1994.

This article contains information about the literary events and publications of 1994.

== Events ==
- October 11 – The choice of James Kelman's book How Late It Was, How Late as the year's Booker Prize winner proves controversial. One of the judges, Rabbi Julia Neuberger, declares it "a disgrace" and leaves the event, later calling the book "crap"; WHSmith's marketing manager calls the award "an embarrassment to the whole book trade"; Waterstone's in Glasgow (where it is set) sells a mere 13 copies of Kelman's "Mogadon" the following week.
- November 26 – Poland's Ministry of Culture and Art orders the exhumation of the presumed grave of the absurdist painter, playwright and novelist Stanisław Ignacy Witkiewicz (suicide 1939) in Zakopane. Genetic tests on the remains show they belonged to an unknown woman.
- December 1 – Iceland's National and University Library of Iceland (Landsbókasafn Íslands – Háskólabókasafn) is founded in Reykjavík by merging the former national library, Landsbókasafn Íslands, established in 1818, with the university library of 1940.
- unknown dates
  - Penguin Books offer Peter James's novel Host on two floppy disks as "the world's first electronic novel".
  - The first Giller Prize for Canadian Fiction is awarded.

== New books ==
=== Fiction ===
- Peter Ackroyd – Dan Leno and the Limehouse Golem
- Nelson Algren (died 1981) – The Texas Stories of Nelson Algren (short stories)
- Kevin J. Anderson
  - Champions of the Force
  - Dark Apprentice
  - Jedi Search
- Reed Arvin – The Wind in the Wheat
- Thomas Berger – Robert Crews
- Louis de Bernières – Captain Corelli's Mandolin
- Lily Brett – Just Like That
- George Mackay Brown – Beside the Ocean of Time
- Christopher Bulis – State of Change
- James Chapman – Glass (Pray the Electrons Back to Sand)
- Tom Clancy – Debt of Honor
- Jonathan Coe – What a Carve Up!
- Michael Connelly – The Concrete Blonde
- Paul Cornell
  - Goth Opera
  - No Future
- Bernard Cornwell – Copperhead
- Douglas Coupland – Life After God
- Michael Crichton – Disclosure
- Terrance Dicks – Blood Harvest
- Stephen R. Donaldson – The Gap into Madness: Chaos and Order
- Bret Easton Ellis – The Informers
- Valerio Evangelisti – Nicolas Eymerich, inquisitore
- David Frum – Dead Right
- Stephen Fry – The Hippopotamus
- William Gaddis – A Frolic of His Own
- Neil Gaiman
  - The Sandman: Brief Lives (graphic novel, seventh in The Sandman series)
  - The Sandman: Worlds' End (graphic novel, eighth in The Sandman series)
- Neil Gaiman & Dave McKean – Mr. Punch (graphic novel)
- John Gardner – SeaFire
- James Finn Garner – Politically Correct Bedtime Stories
- David S. Garnett – Stargonauts
- Mark Gatiss – St Anthony's Fire
- Judith Godrèche – Point de côté
- John Grisham – The Chamber
- Romesh Gunesekera – Reef
- Abdulrazak Gurnah – Paradise
- Suzette Haden Elgin – Earthsong
- Peter Handke – My Year in the No-Man's-Bay
- Epeli Hau'ofa – Tales of the Tikongs
- Dermot Healy – A Goat's Song
- Joseph Heller – Closing Time
- James Herbert – The Ghosts of Sleath
- Craig Hinton – The Crystal Bucephalus
- Alan Hollinghurst – The Folding Star
- Nancy Huston – La Virevolte
- John Irving – A Son of the Circus
- Alexander Jablokov – The Breath of Suspension
- James Kelman – How Late It Was, How Late
- Stephen King – Insomnia
- Dean R. Koontz – Dark Rivers of the Heart
- Joe R. Lansdale – Mucho Mojo
- Andy Lane – All-Consuming Fire
- Ursula K. Le Guin – "The Matter of Seggri" (in Crank!)
- Madeleine L'Engle – Troubling a Star
- Paul Leonard – Venusian Lullaby
- Jonathan Lethem – Gun, with Occasional Music
- H. P. Lovecraft – Miscellaneous Writings
- Steve Lyons – Conundrum
- F. Gwynplaine MacIntyre – The Woman Between the Worlds
- David A. McIntee – First Frontier
- Javier Marías – Tomorrow in the Battle Think on Me (Mañana en la batalla piensa en mí)
- Simon Messingham – Strange England
- James A. Michener – Recessional
- Rick Moody – The Ice Storm
- Jim Mortimore – Parasite
- Herta Müller – The Land of Green Plums
- Ryū Murakami (村上 龍) – Piercing (ピアッシング, English translation 2007)
- Tim O'Brien – In the Lake of the Woods
- Daniel O'Mahony – Falls the Shadow
- V. S. Naipaul – A Way in the World
- John Peel – Evolution
- Tito Perdue – The New Austerities
- Ellis Peters – Brother Cadfael's Penance
- Terry Pratchett
  - Interesting Times
  - Soul Music
- Qiu Miaojin (邱妙津) – Notes of a Crocodile
- James Redfield – The Celestine Prophecy
- Matthew Reilly – Contest
- Justin Richards – Theatre of War
- Gareth Roberts – Tragedy Day
- Gary Russell – Legacy
- David Sedaris – Barrel Fever
- Sidney Sheldon – Nothing Lasts Forever
- Michael Slade – Ripper
- S. P. Somtow – Jasmine Nights
- Danielle Steel
  - Accident
  - The Gift
  - Wings
- Botho Strauß – Living Glimmering Lying
- Antonio Tabucchi – Pereira Maintains (Sostiene Pereira)
- William Trevor – Felicia's Journey
- John Updike – Brazil
- Andrew Vachss – Down in the Zero
- Marlene van Niekerk – Triomf
- Jill Paton Walsh – Knowledge of Angels
- Tim Winton – The Riders

=== Children and young people ===
- Pamela Allen – Clippity-Clop
- Chris Van Allsburg – The Mysteries of Harris Burdick
- Nancy Farmer – The Ear, the Eye and the Arm
- Mem Fox – Tough Boris
- Gayle Greeno – Mind-Speakers' Call
- Donald Hall (with Barry Moser)
  - The Farm Summer 1942
  - I Am the Dog, I Am the Cat
- Julius Lester –John Henry
- J. Patrick Lewis (with Gary Kelley) – The Christmas of the Reddle Moon
- Sam McBratney – Guess How Much I Love You (board book)
- Andre Norton (with Martin H. Greenberg and Braldt Bralds) – Catfantastic III
- Glyn Parry –Monster Man
- Gloria Jean Pinkney –The Sunday Outing
- Jennifer Rowe (as Mary-Anne Dickinson) – The Charm Bracelet (first in the Fairy Realm series of ten books)
- Francesca Simon – Horrid Henry (first in the eponymous series of 24 books)
- Paul and Henrietta Stickland – Dinosaur Roar!
- Amy Tan – Sagwa, the Chinese Siamese Cat
- Jacqueline Wilson – Freddy's Teddy (first in the eponymous series of four books)

=== Drama ===
- Marina Carr – The Mai
- Kevin Elyot – My Night With Reg
- Jon Fosse – Og aldri skal vi skiljast (And We'll Never Be Parted)
- Terry Johnson – Dead Funny
- Arthur Miller – Broken Glass
- Yasmina Reza – Art

=== Poetry ===
- Sophie Cabot Black – The Misunderstanding of Nature

=== Non-fiction ===
- Michael Asher – Thesiger
- Alan Bennett – Writing Home
- John Berendt – Midnight in the Garden of Good and Evil
- Harold Bloom – The Western Canon: The Books and School of the Ages
- Denise Chong – The Concubine's Children
- Antonio Damasio – Descartes' Error: Emotion, Reason, and the Human Brain
- Anne Hugon – Vers Tombouctou : L'Afrique des explorateurs II
- Paul Lawrence Farber – Finding Order in Nature: The Naturalist Tradition from Linnaeus to E. O. Wilson
- Leon Forrest – Relocations of the Spirit: Collected Essays
- V. A. C. Gatrell – The Hanging Tree: Execution and the English People 1780–1868
- Martin Gilbert – In Search of Churchill
- Christina Hoff Sommers – Who Stole Feminism? How Women Have Betrayed Women
- Will Hutton – The State We're In
- Richard Leakey – The Origin of Humankind
- Li Zhisui (邱妙津) – The Private Life of Chairman Mao
- Steven Pinker – The Language Instinct
- Tricia Rose – Black Noise: Rap Music and Black Culture in Contemporary America
- Carl Sagan – Pale Blue Dot: A Vision of the Human Future in Space
- Richard B. Trask – Pictures of the Pain: Photography and the Assassination of President Kennedy
- Gabrielle van Zuylen – The Garden: Visions of Paradise
- Charles P. Cozic – Nationalism and Ethnic Conflict
- Elizabeth Wurtzel – Prozac Nation

== Births ==
- April 18 – Alexandra Adornetto, Australian children's novelist
- June 25 – Robbie Coburn, Australian poet
- October 16 – Alice Oseman, English author of young adult fiction

== Deaths ==
- January 3 – Frank Belknap Long, American horror, fantasy and sci-fi writer (born 1901)
- January 30 – Pierre Boulle, French novelist (born 1912)
- January 31 – Erwin Strittmatter, German writer (born 1912)
- February 6 – Jack Kirby, American comic book cartoonist (born 1917)
- February 11 – Paul Feyerabend, Austrian philosopher of science (born 1924)
- February 26 – J. L. Carr, English novelist (born 1912)
- February 27 – Harold Acton, English writer, scholar and dilettante (born 1904)
- March 9 – Charles Bukowski, German-born American poet and novelist (born 1920)
- March 20 – Lewis Grizzard, American journalist and author (born 1946)
- March 28 – Eugène Ionesco, Romanian playwright (born 1909)
- April 16 – Ralph Ellison, American scholar and writer (born 1914)
- May 24 – John Wain, English novelist, poet and critic (born 1925)
- May 30
  - Juan Carlos Onetti, Uruguayan writer (born 1909)
  - Isobel English (June Guesdon Jolliffe), English novelist (born 1920)
- June 7 – Dennis Potter, English TV dramatist (born 1935)
- June 17 – Yuri Nagibin, Soviet screenwriter and novelist (born 1920)
- June 26 – Jahanara Imam, Bangladeshi writer and political activist (born 1929)
- July 5 – Vaikom Muhammad Basheer, Malayalam short story writer (born 1908)
- July 30 – Robin Cook (Derek Raymond), English novelist (born 1931)
- August 7 – Rosa Chacel, Spanish writer (born 1898)
- August 14 – Alice Childress, African American playwright, actress and young-adult novelist (born 1916)
- August 25 – Bidhyanath Pokhrel, Nepali poet (born 1918)
- September 7 – James Clavell, Australian-born American novelist (born 1921)
- November 12 – J. I. M. Stewart (Michael Innes), Scottish novelist and critic (born 1906)
- November 15 – Elizabeth George Speare, American children's writer (born 1908)
- November 28 – Ian Serraillier, English novelist and poet (born 1912)
- December 12 – Donna J. Stone, American poet and philanthropist (born 1933)
- December 20 – Eva Alexanderson, Swedish novelist and translator (born 1911)
- December 24 – John Osborne, English dramatist (born 1929)

== Awards ==
- Nobel Prize for Literature: Kenzaburō Ōe
- Europe Theatre Prize: Heiner Müller
- Camões Prize: Jorge Amado

=== Australia ===
- The Australian/Vogel Literary Award: Darren Williams, Swimming In Silk
- C. J. Dennis Prize for Poetry: Robert Gray, Certain Things
- Kenneth Slessor Prize for Poetry: Barry Hill, Ghosting William Buckley
- Mary Gilmore Prize: Deborah Staines, Now, Millennium
- Miles Franklin Award: Rodney Hall, The Grisly Wife

=== Canada ===
- Bronwen Wallace Memorial Award
- Edna Staebler Award: Linda Johns, Sharing a Robin's Life,
- Giller Prize for Canadian Fiction: M.G. Vassanji, The Book of Secrets
- See 1994 Governor General's Awards for a complete list of winners and finalists for those awards.

=== France ===
- Prix Goncourt: Didier Van Cauwelaert, Un Aller simple
- Prix Décembre: Jean Hatzfeld, L'Air de guerre and Éric Holder, La Belle Jardinière
- Prix Médicis French: Yves Berger, Immobile dans le courant du fleuve
- Prix Médicis International: Robert Schneider, Frère Sommeil

=== United Kingdom ===
- Booker Prize: James Kelman, How Late It Was, How Late
- Carnegie Medal for children's literature: Theresa Breslin, Whispers in the Graveyard
- James Tait Black Memorial Prize for fiction: Alan Hollinghurst, The Folding Star
- James Tait Black Memorial Prize for biography: Doris Lessing, Under My Skin
- Cholmondeley Award: Ruth Fainlight, Gwen Harwood, Elizabeth Jennings, John Mole
- Eric Gregory Award: Julia Copus, Alice Oswald, Steven Blyth, Kate Clanchy, Giles Goodland
- Whitbread Best Book Award: William Trevor, Felicia's Journey

=== United States ===
- Agnes Lynch Starrett Poetry Prize: Jan Beatty, Mad River
- Aiken Taylor Award for Modern American Poetry: Wendell Berry
- Anisfield-Wolf Book Award: Judith Ortiz Cofer, The Latin Deli: Prose and Poetry
- Bernard F. Connors Prize for Poetry: Stewart James, "Vanessa", and (separately) Marilyn Hacker, "Cancer Winter"
- Bobbitt National Prize for Poetry: A. R. Ammons, Garbage
- Compton Crook Award: Mary Rosenblum, The Drylands
- National Book Award for Fiction: William Gaddis, A Frolic of His Own
- National Book Critics Circle Award: Carol Shields, The Stone Diaries
- Nebula Award: Greg Bear, Moving Mars
- Newbery Medal for children's literature: Lois Lowry, The Giver
- PEN/Faulkner Award for Fiction: Philip Roth, Operation Shylock
- Pulitzer Prize for Drama: Edward Albee, Three Tall Women
- Pulitzer Prize for Fiction: E. Annie Proulx, The Shipping News
- Pulitzer Prize for Poetry: Yusef Komunyakaa, Neon Vernacular: New and Selected Poems
- Wallace Stevens Award inaugurated with first award this year: W. S. Merwin
- Whiting Awards:

Fiction: Louis Edward, Mary Hood, Randall Kenan (fiction/nonfiction), Kate Wheeler
Nonfiction: Kennedy Fraser, Wayne Koestenbaum (nonfiction/poetry), Rosemary Mahoney, Claudia Roth Pierpont
Poetry: Mark Doty, Mary Swander (poetry/nonfiction)

=== Elsewhere ===
- Friedenspreis des Deutschen Buchhandels: Jorge Semprún
- Montana Book Award for Poetry: Bill Manhire, ed., 100 New Zealand Poems
- New Zealand Book Award for Poetry: Andrew Johnston, How to Talk
- Premio Nadal: Rosa Regàs, Azul
- Premio de la Crítica de narrativa gallega: Xurxo Borrazás, Vicious
