= Rosetta Smith =

Afro-Trinidadian slave trader

- Born: c. 1770-1775
- Died: c. 1825 (aged 49–55)
- Other names: Rosetta Picton, Rene Rosetta Picton
- Occupations: slave trader, entrepreneur
- Years active: 1797-1825

Rosetta Smith (c. 1770-1775 – c. 1825) was an Afro-Trinidadian slave trader and entrepreneur. Being a mistress of Thomas Picton, the governor of Trinidad, she was depicted as a seductress and sinister woman who used her wiles to manipulate the governor by contemporary sources. A reexamination of her life indicates that she was an astute businesswoman who was successful in enlarging her fortunes over at least three decades.

== Early life ==
Records of Smith's early life are limited. She was rumoured to be a mulattress of French extraction and was in her twenties when Thomas Picton became governor of Trinidad in 1797. She was also reputed to have been married and left her spouse because of his financial difficulties. By 1798, she had become Picton's mistress and the couple would have four children together.

== Career ==
Smith appears with regularity in the Books of Spanish Protocols of Port of Spain, which were the business transaction records held over from the Spanish colonial rule. The books were in use until 1813, when the British replaced them with their own recordkeeping system. The Protocols and Slave Registers show that she lived in Port of Spain, in an urban environment rather than on a plantation. From the time of Picton's arrival in Port of Spain, she and he engaged in slave catching, which was both legal and lucrative. Though she traded in property, the majority of her income came from the buying, selling and manumission of slaves.

Because of her association with Picton, Smith was often vilified by his detractors. Picton, though a competent military officer, ruled through fear and brutality. After torturing a fourteen-year-old girl by picketing her for theft in 1801, he was removed as Governor of Trinidad in 1803 and returned to England to stand trial. The main accuser of Picton, was William Fullarton, who had been appointed as part of a commission to look into the running of Trinidad. Fullarton and the pamphleteer Pierre McCallum widely reported that Smith was the instigator of Picton's cruelty, putting forth the view that the governor was under her influence. In his report, Fullarton accused Picton and Smith of jailing, punishing and starving maroons and runaways for petty offences and then conducting clandestine sales of them to friends for minimal purchase prices. In actuality, the two had a contract with Antonio Vallecilla, an operative of the Intendant of Caracas, who used his cover as an international slave catcher to conduct surveillance on the British.

Among the unscrupulous business practices Fullarton's accusation against Picton included were that Picton granted a contract to supply the soldiers with wood and sundries to "Mrs. Rosetta Smith, a Woman of Colour, who lived with him". Rumours then surfaced that she used the money from the contract to purchase a bordello, which she used to entertain influential men and elicit secrets from them which she reported to Picton. Further using her influence, she was accused of eliciting bribes from prisoners to secure reductions in their sentences and holding weekly salons to dole out her favors. In one instance, she was accused of using military forces to evict a widow and her two daughters from a home that she wanted to purchase. Smith's side of the story was that the widow had agreed to sell, but later tried to renegotiate the transaction for more money and alleged that they and not Smith were the aggrieved parties. When the women complained to the Colonial Office, no action was taken against Smith, perhaps suggesting that her story was credible.

Smith was not tried for any of the claims made against her. Long after Picton left Trinidad, a business relationship between him and Smith flourished and he left bequests to his four children by her in his will. Despite claims by Fullarton that Smith was unsavory and reviled, she continued to build her business in the slave trade with prominent local businesswomen and men including the Congnet and Philip families.

Records in the Protocols and Slave Registers show that by 1813, Smith owned 32 personal slaves. She used various names in the record books, including Rosetta Smith, Rene Rosetta Picton and Rosetta Picton. She also conducted business with Bartholomew Dwyer, a prosperous, free black attorney, purchasing slaves with him and jointly owning a 350-acre plantation, La Belle Fille, in the Quarter of Santa Cruz. They did not produce goods for export on the plantation, but rather used it to grow their own provisions, avoiding the costly import fees typically charged on food.

== Death and legacy ==
Smith disappears from records by 1825, at which time her daughter Augusta Picton was listed as owning slaves previously owned by Smith. The eldest child of Smith and Picton, Thomas, moved to London and trained as a doctor, Richard married in Trinidad and remained there until at least 1834. Frederick's only mention is in the 1816 will of his father. Smith is still recounted in local newspaper articles in Trinidad which characterize her as the malevolent figure portrayed by Fullarton and McCallum. More recent scholarship by Kit Candlin, and others shows that she was largely used to add fuel to the animosity between Picton and Fullarton and that no real evidence of her character exists. That she was able to expand her business from Port of Spain to Grenada and Venezuela, and do business with prominent white men, long after Picton left the island in 1803, shows that she was an astute entrepreneur with a large network of influential partners. Her adaptability to changing colonial rule and savvy to exploit gaps in the organization system, despite the Colonial government discouraging black people from engaging in "entrepreneurship", led her to become one of the most successful businesswomen in the southern Caribbean.
