= Recessional =

Recessional may refer to:

- Recessional hymn
- Recessional (novel), a novel by James A. Michener, published in 1994
- "Recessional" (poem), a poem by Rudyard Kipling
- "Recessional", a song by Vienna Teng
