= Stickland =

Stickland is a surname of British origin, which may be a locational surname, indicating a person from the village of Stickland in the parish of Winterborne Stickland, Dorset. Alternatively, it may be a topographic name for a person who lived by a steep slope, from the Middle English stickel ("steep") and "land". The surname may refer to:

- Jonathan Stickland (born 1983), American politician
- L. H. Stickland, British biochemist
- Lee Stickland, New Zealand soccer player
- Paul Stickland (born 1957), British illustrator

== See also ==
- Strickland (surname)
