= Luisa Calderón (torture victim) =

Trinidadian domestic servant and torture victim

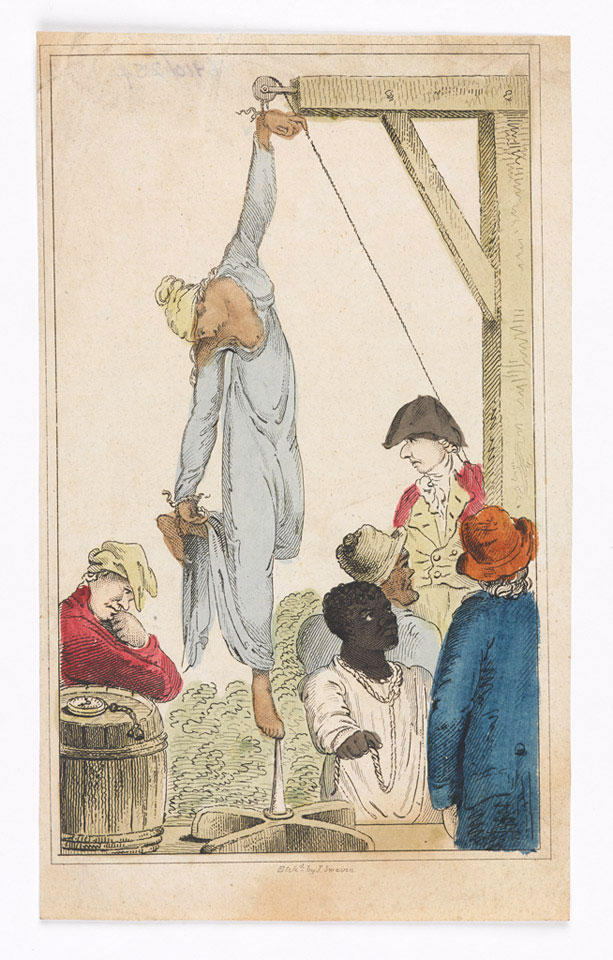
- Etching by John Swaine (1806)
- Born: Luisa Nuñez c. 1788
- Died: maybe 1825; Trinidad
- Occupation: Servant
- Employer: Pedro Ruiz
- Known for: Victim of torture

Luisa Calderón or Louisa Calderon (born maybe 25 August 1788 – died maybe 1825) was a Trinidadian servant and torture victim. In a high profile case, the former governor of Trinidad, Sir Thomas Picton, was found guilty of arranging for her to be tortured. His conviction was later overturned.

Following a re-evaluation of Thomas Picton, Calderón has featured in a display of the former governor's portrait at the National Museum Cardiff.

== Early life ==
Calderón's baptismal record claims that she was born on 25 August 1788, but this may be a later forgery. She was the last of three daughters of Maria Calderón, who had been released from slavery in the Spanish province of Venezuela. Her father was Juan Santiago Bacuba. Calderón was the name of the person who bought her mother out of slavery; the last name of the mother and daughter had previously been that of their owner, who was named Nuñez.

Trinidad was captured from the Spanish in 1797 and became a British colony. Calderón grew up speaking Spanish, the island's common language, and according to the Oxford Dictionary of National Biography, "Creole" (whether this was English-based or French-based is not specified). From around July 1799, when she was about 10 or 11 years old, she and her mother were the housekeepers of Pedro Ruiz. Ruiz was a cattle dealer from Venezuela living in Port of Spain. Calderón lived in his house, which was located in what was then called the Plaza de la Marina, near the governor's residence. Calderón's mother later testified that Luisa had been Ruiz's mistress and that he had promised to marry her.

== Trial ==
In December 1801, Pedro Ruiz found that a chest containing valuables had been broken into. He reported the theft to Governor Picton and accused his housekeeper, Calderón, and a man named Carlos Gonzales, whom he suspected of having an affair with Calderón. Calderón, her mother, and, later, Gonzales were arrested and imprisoned. The case appeared before the justice of the peace, Hilaire Bégorrat, who was a planter and a friend of the governor.

English law theoretically applied in Trinidad, but Spanish law was applied with the tolerance of the colonial power. Torture and executions were commonplace, and the Port of Spain prison was feared. In Great Britain abolitionism was gaining popularity, while the economy of the Trinidad colony was based on the exploitation of enslaved people which Governor Picton supported. The total population in 1797 was less than 20,000. During his period as Governor the population of enslaved black workers in Trinidad almost doubled (to around 19,700 people). In 1803 the proportion of the population that was free was 12%.

Calderón did not confess. On 22 December 1801, Bégorrat issued an order for a torture interrogation, which Picton signed. Bégorrat had Calderón subjected to a torture called "piquet" in prison, which was unusually harsh even by Trinidadian standards. Calderón's left foot was tied to her right wrist. She was suspended by the left wrist and rested with her right foot on a rounded, thin stake driven into the ground, on which her entire weight rested. The pain in her foot was considerable and could only be relieved by shifting her weight, which was also painful, onto her tied-up wrist. In addition to Bégorrat, five officials and assistants, including the clerk, were present as witnesses.

Calderón made a partial confession, incriminating Gonzales but denying any involvement in the crime. The next day, Christmas Eve, a similar torture session followed, but had to be stopped without a confession because Calderón fainted several times. Torture was illegal under English law at the time but permitted under Spanish law for those over the age of 14. There were no immediate consequences for the incident – Calderón refused to make a valid confession even under torture, and as governor, Picton was subject to few restrictions in Trinidad itself.

Over the years, Picton had made enemies among those residents of British descent. This opposition gained a hearing in London until, in July 1802, the relevant ministry decided to establish a three-person commissariat in place of the governor's post. William Fullarton was appointed First Commissioner, responsible for civil administration. Picton was to be Second Commissioner, responsible for military affairs on land; Samuel Hood was appointed Third Commissioner, responsible for the navy. In August 1802, Calderón was released on Picton's orders after eight months of imprisonment, although Picton remained convinced of her guilt; she had "expired her guilt by her long imprisonment".

In January 1803, Fullarton arrived with his wife Marianne Hamilton Fullarton. The role of governor had been abolished and Fullarton had been appointed as the first commissioner. Picton was the second commissioner. William and Marianne Fullarton interviewed Calderón as they gathered evidence for an indictment against Picton. Picton and Fullarton did not get on.

It was said that a forged birth certificate made Calderón two years younger and that Fullarton swore Luisa's mother to the new year of birth. The court in London, which Fullarton had written to, asked for witnesses and agreed to pay their way if they travelled to Great Britain with Fullarton.

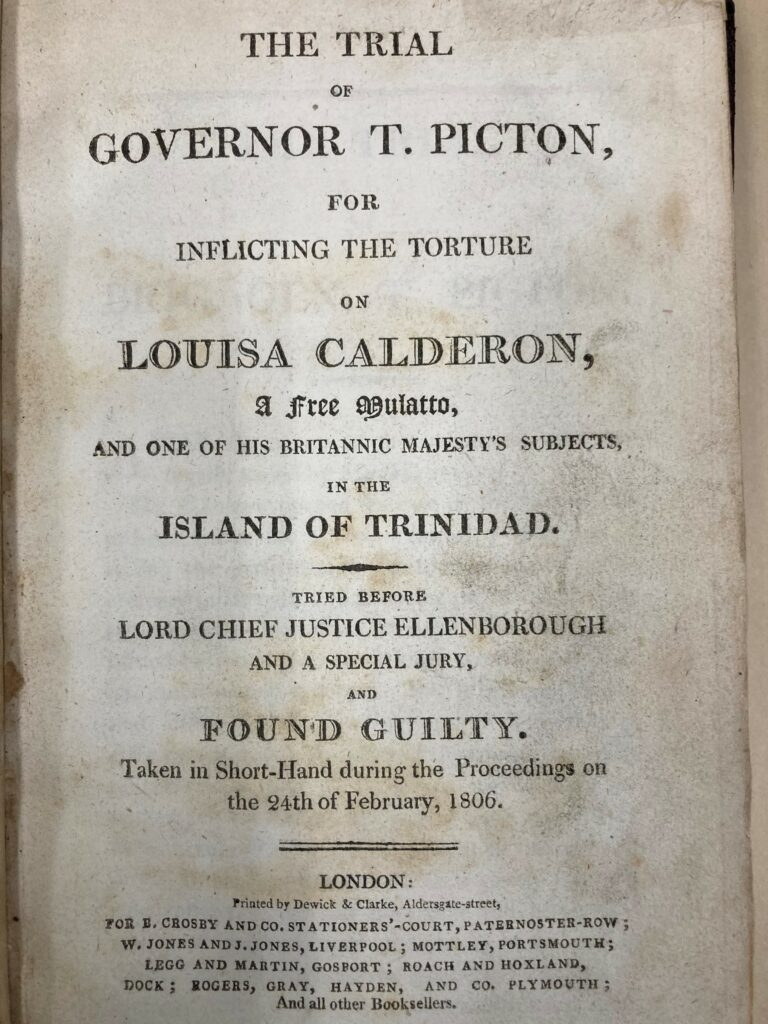
The 1806 trial

In July 1803, Fullarton, victim, and perpetrator travelled together to Great Britain, first to Glasgow, near which the entourage first spent a few days on Fullarton's estate in Ayrshire. As a Black woman with her traditional muslin turban, Calderón was a striking figure; contemporary reports described her as a "Creole with an interesting countenance, of distinguished appearance (and) slender and graceful." A few days later, the entourage departed for London, where Fullarton filed charges of illegally torturing a free black woman under the age of 14. Picton landed in October and found himself dubbed the "bloodstained governor of Trinidad."

Calderón, who was present in London during the trial, became a subject of tabloid coverage. Portraits of Calderón were sold on the streets of London. Negative rumours also circulated. Brevet major Edward Draper published support for Picton, which led him to be jailed for three months for libel. Picton was unusually visited by the Prince Regent.

In early December 1803, Picton was arrested and released after posting a high bail. The court requested additional documents from Trinidad and ordered the examination of additional witnesses on site. A one-way trip between Trinidad and London took two months. In Trinidad, friends of Picton and friends of Fullarton were said to be forging documents and influencing witnesses. In December 1804, witness testimony began in Port of Spain. A central focus was Calderón's correct age, which proved difficult due to the lack of written records and the fact that biased witnesses provided implausible statements. Calderón's mother gave dates of birth that would have meant that Calderón had become Ruiz's mistress at the age of seven. In London, interest shifted to the question of the extent to which Spanish law actually permitted torture.

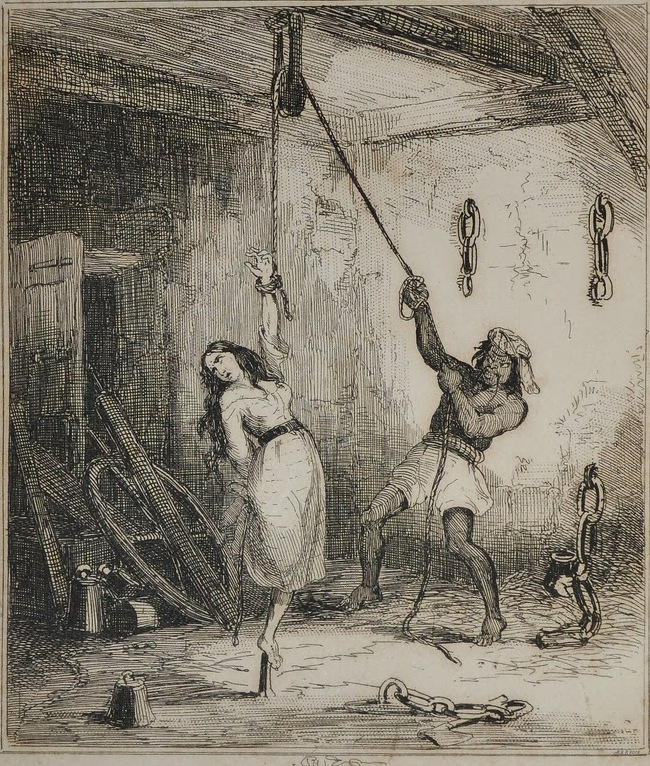
A contemporary illustration

On 24 February 1806, Picton was found guilty of torture, and an appeal was filed. Fullarton died in February 1808, and the case against Picton was reopened in the following June. Calderón had now been living in Great Britain for five years, and she had learned English well enough not to need an interpreter. Once again, she had to describe the torture and show the scars on her wrists. This time the court's assessment was different; Picton was acquitted.

It has been speculated that there never was a theft. It is said that Ruiz faked the theft and he then accused Calderón because of her relationship with Gonzales.

== Final years ==
She is reported to have asked for a passport to return to Trinidad in 1810. One source says that she died in 1825 in Trinidad.

== Legacy ==
Nobel Prize winner V. S. Naipaul, who was born in Trinidad, gave a detailed account of the affair in his The Loss of El Dorado (1969). He was interested in it as one of the few examples of the remote colony impacting events in Britain. He returned to the case in A Way in the World (1994), which reworks some of the material in the first book.

In the 21st century the display of memorials to Picton has been questioned. In 2021 due to Picton´s record in Trinidad, National Museum Cardiff removed from display a portrait by Sir Martin Archer Shee, which it has owned since 1907. On Emancipation Day in August 2022, the portrait, which had previously formed part of the "Faces of Wales" gallery, was put back on display in an exhibition called "Reframing Picton", which included work by artists of Trinidadian heritage. Along with the portrait, Calderón and other women were featured in a display which documented the cruelty of Picton.

== Bibliography ==
- Naipaul, V. S. (1969). The Loss of El Dorado: a history. London: André Deutsch.

The book has been translated into German (Abschied von Eldorado. List Verlag, Munich 2003, ISBN 3-548-60358-0) and Spanish (La pérdida de El Dorado).
