= Tito Perdue =

American writer (born 1938)

- Born: Albert Monroe Perdue; 16 August 1938 (age 88); Sewell, Chile
- Education: Antioch College, University of Texas
- Occupation: Novelist
- Spouse: Judy Clark (m. 1957)
- Children: 1
- Writing career
- Pen name: Tito Perdue
- Genres: Novel, satire
- Subjects: Degeneration, beauty
- Notable work: Lee (1991)
- Website: titoperdue.com

Tito Perdue (born 16 August 1938) is an American novelist. His works include his 1991 debut Lee.

== Personal life ==
=== Early life and education ===
Perdue was born Albert Perdue to American parents in Chile, where his father worked as an electrical engineer for the Braden Copper Company. (Note: In an interview on Counter-Currents Radio, ep. 205 (20 November 2017), 00:56-01:22, Perdue explains: "I was named, after my father, 'Albert.' But in Chile, the word tito means 'little.' It also can mean 'junior.' So I was called 'Albertito,' you know, 'Albert, Jr.,' 'little Albert.' And after a while they dropped the 'Albert' and people began calling me 'Tito.' And it sounds so much more literary, you know, than merely 'Albert': so I decided to use that for my pen-name.") The family returned to the United States in 1941, upon the country's entering the War. Perdue was brought up in Anniston, Alabama. He graduated from Indian Springs School in 1956. He attended Antioch College for a year before he was expelled for cohabiting with a fellow student, Judy Clark. They married in 1957.

Perdue received a BA in English literature from the University of Texas, and an MA in modern European history and an MLS from Indiana University.

=== Career ===
He then worked as an assistant professor and librarian at universities including Iowa State University and SUNY Binghamton. During this time, he contributed under his birth name to scholarly journals of history and library science.

In 1983, he retired to his mother's family's Alabama property to write full time. He wrote The Sweet-Scented Manuscript first; though this would be his fourth novel published.

=== Family ===
Judy Perdue worked as a librarian and professor of biology at Floyd College and elsewhere. She is fellow of the Royal Entomological Society (London) and member of other learned associations. Her father, Christopher Clark, wrote novels of working class life, including The Unleashed Will (1947) and Good Is for Angels (1950).

The Perdues have one daughter. They live in Centreville and Wetumpka, Alabama.

=== Views ===
As of 2001, Perdue was a member of the League of the South (since renamed), an American organization which the ADL and SPLC have characterized as "Neo-Confederate" and "white supremacist."

== Work ==
Perdue's novels are picaresques, built of "disjointed episodes." He explains: "I don't believe that prose should be translucent. I don't believe that plot is all that matters. I believe that language matters greatly. ... My books have very little plot. I don't even like plot." Perdue often incorporates elements of fantasy (like active volcanoes in nineteenth- and twentieth-century Alabama) or, in later novels, science fiction (like the "escrubilator," an indescribable "omni-competent" machine).

=== The Pefley sequence ===
Many of Perdue's novels chronicle the life of Leland "Lee" Pefley, an alter ego who, Perdue explains, "actually carries out actions that his creator would often wish to perform if he but had the courage." In narrative order, these are:

Title	Lee's age in novel	Publication date
The Smut Book	11	2020
Morning Crafts	13	2012
The Sweet-Scented Manuscript	at university	2004
The New Austerities	42	1994
Journey to a Location	70	2021
Though We Be Dead, Yet Our Day Shall Come	70	2018
Materials for All Future Historians	71	2019
Lee	72	1991
Fields of Asphodel	in the afterlife	2007

An aged Pefley also features prominently in the first half of Reuben. The lives of Lee's forebears are chronicled in Opportunities in Alabama Agriculture and the four-volume William's House, for which Perdue drew on records of his own family history.

== Reception ==
=== Critical reception ===
Perdue's novels have encountered "critical but not much popular success." Jim Knipfel and Gary Heidt have named Perdue among their favourite writers. For Knipfel, Perdue is "without question, one of the most important contemporary Southern writers we have" and "among the most important American writers of the early 21st century."

Critics have commented on Perdue's "idiosyncratic" prose. Anne Whitehouse of The New York Times finds Lee "vitriolic and hallucinatory, yet surprisingly lucid, producing a portrait both exceedingly strange and troubling." In the New York Press, Knipfel praises Perdue's "fluid, consciously musical prose," "full of rage but under complete control," noting that it becomes "progressively textured and more savage" with time. However, Publishers Weekly finds that Lee "sinks under the weight of its own pretensions"; and Dick Roraback of the Los Angeles Times complains of Perdue's eccentric (mis)usages in The New Austerities.

Thomas Fleming calls the Pefley sequence "some of the best satire on contemporary America"; and Kirkus Reviews notes the "marvelous black comedy" in Lee. Antoine Wilson of the Los Angeles Times finds "tone-deaf caricature" in some satirical passages of Fields of Asphodel, but praises its "utterly charming and brilliantly comic" denouement.

=== Scholarly reception ===
Lee is discussed in Bill Kauffman's analysis of secessionist literary fiction in Bye Bye, Miss American Empire (2010). In Imagining Alternative Worlds (2025), Bernhard Forchtner and Christoffer Kølvraa discuss Perdue's fiction as exemplary of the "nostalgic imaginary." Enrico Schlickeisen (2023) and Sof Sabbioni (2025) have discussed Perdue in the context of "far-right" politics.

His academic writing (as Albert Perdue) continues to be cited.

=== Recognition ===
On March 7, 2015, Perdue received the first H. P. Lovecraft Prize for Literature. The trophy was a porcelain bust of Lovecraft by Charles Krafft.

== Publications ==
=== Novels ===
- Lee, Four Walls Eight Windows, 1991 (ISBN 9780941423397); 2nd ed., Overlook Press, 2007 (ISBN 978-1-58567-872-3); 3rd ed., Arktos, 2019 (ISBN 9781912975280).
- The New Austerities, Peachtree Press, 1994 (ISBN 978-1-56145-086-2); 2nd ed., Standard American, 2023 (ISBN 9781642640359).
- Opportunities in Alabama Agriculture, Baskerville Press, 1994 (ISBN 978-1-880909-24-9); 2nd ed., Standard American, 2023 (ISBN 9781642640311).
- The Sweet-Scented Manuscript, Baskerville Press, 2004 (ISBN 978-1-880909-68-3); 2nd ed., Arktos, 2019 (ISBN 9781912975389).
- Fields of Asphodel, Overlook Press, 2007 (ISBN 978-1-58567-871-6); 2nd ed., Standard American, 2023 (ISBN 9781642640212).
- The Node, Nine-Banded Books, 2011 (ISBN 978-1-61658-351-4); 2nd ed., Standard American, 2026 (ISBN 978-1642640786).
- Morning Crafts, Arktos, 2013 (ISBN 978-1-907166-57-0).
- Reuben, Washington Summit, 2014 (ISBN 9781593680237); 2nd ed., Standard American, 2022 (ISBN 9781642641950).
- The Builder: William's House I, Arktos, 2015 (ISBN 9781910524343).
- The Churl: William's House II, Arktos, 2015 (ISBN 9781910524336).
- The Engineer: William's House III, Arktos, 2016 (ISBN 9781910524954).
- The Bachelor: William's House IV, Arktos, 2016 (ISBN 9781910524381).
- Cynosura, Counter-Currents, 2016 (ISBN 9781940933863).
- The Philatelist, Counter-Currents, 2017 (ISBN 9781940933986).
- Philip, Arktos, 2017 (ISBN 9781912079889).
- The Bent Pyramid, Arktos, 2018 (ISBN 9781912079858).
- Though We Be Dead, Yet Our Day Shall Come, Counter-Currents, 2018 (ISBN 9781940933894).
- The Gizmo, Counter-Currents, 2019 (ISBN 9781642641202).
- The Smut Book, Counter-Currents, 2020 (ISBN 9781642641424).
- Love Song of the Australopiths, Standard American, 2020 (ISBN 9781642641462).
- Materials for All Future Historians, Standard American, 2020 (ISBN 9781642641639).
- Journey to a Location, Arktos, 2021 (ISBN 9781914208263).
- Vade Mecum, Standard American, 2021 (ISBN 9781642641837).

=== Short Fiction ===
- "Good Things in Tiny Places," Counter-Currents (12 March 2015).

=== Nonfiction ===
- Review of Alex Kurtagić, Mister, in Counter-Currents (16 September 2013).
- "Decadence," Counter-Currents (19 March 2014).

=== Contributions to volumes ===
- Preface to Derek Turner, Sea Changes (Whitefish, MT: Washington Summit, 2012).
- Foreword to Greg Johnson, In Defense of Prejudice (San Fancisco: Counter-Currents, 2017).
- Preface to Jean Raspail, The Camp of the Saints (Petoskey, MI: Social Contract Press, 2018).

=== Academic writing (as Albert Perdue) ===
- "Hertzberg's Napoleonana," Books at Iowa, no. 10 (April 1969), pp. 3–10.
- "Conflicts in Collection Development," Library Acquisitions: Practice and Theory, vol. 2, no. 2, (1978), pp. 123–6.
- Review of Eliyahu Ashtor, The Medieval Near East: Social and Economic History, in Journal of Asian History, vol. 13, no. 2 (1979), pp. 191–2.
- Review of Maurice Gaudefroy-Demombynes, Le Pélerinage à la Mekke: Étude d'Histoire Religieuse, in The Reprint Bulletin Book Reviews, vol. xxiv, no. 1 (1979), p. 5.
- Review of Afaf Lutfi Al-Sayyid-Marsot, Society and the Sexes in Medieval Islam, in Journal of Asian History, vol. 14, no. 2 (1980), pp. 149–50.
- Review of Eliyahu Ashtor, A Social and Economic History of the Near East in the Middle Ages, in The American Historical Review, vol. 85, no. 2 (April 1980), p. 439.
