= The New Austerities =

1994 novel by Tito Perdue

- Cover of the first edition
- Author: Tito Perdue
- Language: English
- Publisher: Peachtree Press
- Publication date: 1994
- Publication place: United States
- Pages: 218
- ISBN: 9781561450862

The New Austerities is a 1994 novel by the American writer Tito Perdue. It is a prequel to his first novel, Lee.

== Publication history ==
The novel was first published in 1994 by Peachtree Press. A new edition was published by Standard American in 2023.

== Reception ==
Publishers Weekly notes Perdue's "magically evocative descriptive powers, pungent wit and iconoclastic point of view."

In the New York Press, Jim Knipfel notes approvingly that, since Perdue’s debut, Lee, his "writing had grown progressively textured and more savage." Elsewhere, Knipfel writes that "Perdue's craftsmanship and descriptive prose remains unmatched by most any writer I can think of today."

In the Los Angeles Times, Dick Roraback finds Lee "engaging character" but complains of Perdue's eccentric diction.

In Chronicles, Thomas Fleming judges The New Austerities, and Perdue’s fiction in general, "some of the best satire on contemporary America" and "novels which can hold their own with the best postmodern fiction."

== Series ==
The main character, Lee Pefley, and his forebears appear in many of Perdue's novels. Lee (1991) is about the end of his life and Fields of Asphodel (2007) follows his journeys in the afterlife.
