= Lee (novel) =

Novel by Tito Perdue

- Cover of the first edition
- Author: Tito Perdue
- Language: English
- Publisher: Four Walls Eight Windows
- Publication date: August 15, 1991
- Publication place: United States
- Pages: 145
- ISBN: 978-0-941423-39-7

Lee is a 1991 novel by the American writer Tito Perdue. It tells the story of an angry and well-read septuagenarian, Leland "Lee" Pefley, who returns to his hometown in Alabama after many years in the North.

== Publication history ==
The book was published on August 15, 1991 by Four Walls Eight Windows. It was reissued in paperback in 2007 by the Overlook Press to coincide with the publication of Fields of Asphodel. A new edition was published by Arktos in 2019.

== Reception ==
Publishers Weekly wrote: "Steeped in Greek classics, spouting cultured allusions to such subjects as Persian painting and Dostoyevski, Lee fancies himself a chastiser of humanity, satirist of the New South, a self-ordained Nietzschean prophet of the crumbling of the West. ... A solipsistic little parable of spiritual self-delusion, the novel starts out interestingly but sinks under the weight of its own pretensions."

Kirkus Reviews found that Perdue "writes convincingly and iconoclastically about a misanthrope who is frightening in his complete contempt for anyone who has not 'held on to their soul.'" The critic continued: "While Lee's critique of modernity seems to be deadly serious, Perdue offers a marvelous black comedy that is sometimes as astringent as John Yount's Toots in Solitude. A promising debut."

Jim Knipfel wrote in New York Press in 2001 that reading Lee when it came out "hooked [him] for good" on Perdue and made Perdue one of his favorite authors.

== Series ==
The main character and his relatives appear in a number of the author's other books. These include The New Austerities (1994), which depicts Lee in his middle age working for an insurance company, Opportunities in Alabama Agriculture (1994), which is about his grandfather, The Sweet-Scented Manuscript (2004), about Lee's college days, and Fields of Asphodel (2007), which is about Lee in the afterlife.
