= Monster Man =

Monster Man may refer to:

- Monster Man (film) a 2003 comedy horror movie
- Monster Man (TV series) a 2012 Syfy reality TV series
- Monster Man (novel) a 1994 novel by Glynn Parry
- Monsterman, a 2014 documentary film about Mr Lordi and the Finnish heavy metal band Lordi
- "Monster Man", a song by Soul Coughing from the 1998 album El Oso
- Monster man (gridiron football), a defensive position in American and Canadian football
