= The Loss of El Dorado =

1969 history book by V. S. Naipaul

- First edition
- Author: V. S. Naipaul
- Language: English
- Genre: History
- Publisher: André Deutsch (UK), Alfred A. Knopf (US)
- Publication date: 1969
- Media type: Print
- Pages: 334
- ISBN: 0233961429

The Loss of El Dorado is a 1969 history book by V. S. Naipaul about Venezuela and Trinidad. The title refers to the legend of El Dorado.

Naipaul looks at the Spanish-British colonial rivalry in the Orinoco Basin, drawing on contemporary sources written in Spanish and English. The book examines the obsessive quest for gold which was typical of the first Europeans to explore the region. In particular, Sir Walter Raleigh's voyages are examined with a psychological depth more typical of novels than historical works.

In the second half of the book, the focus shifts to Trinidad under British colonial rule, where rather than a fruitless quest for gold deposits, the colonial power developed a plantation economy. Naipaul gives a lot of attention to the trial of Sir Thomas Picton for the torture of Luisa Calderón while he was serving as the Governor of Trinidad. He also looks at Venezuela's struggle for independence from Spain in the early 19th century.

The Loss of El Dorado received positive reviews but was a commercial disappointment, selling only 3,000 copies in the United States. Naipaul confessed to not being completely happy with his book. He reworked some of its material in a later book, A Way in the World, where historical narrative is treated in a different way, and is in part rendered as fiction.

== Translations ==
- La pérdida de El Dorado (Spanish translation by Flora Casas, Madrid 2001).
- Abschied von Eldorado (German translation)
