= Fields of Asphodel =

2007 American novel

- Cover of first edition
- Author: Tito Perdue
- Language: English
- Publisher: The Overlook Press
- Publication date: 19 July 2007
- Publication place: United States
- Pages: 252
- ISBN: 9781585678716

Fields of Asphodel is a 2007 novel by the American writer Tito Perdue. It picks up the story of Leland "Lee" Pefley where Perdue's first novel, Lee, left off.

== Publication history ==
The novel was first published in 2007 by the Overlook Press simultaneously with the reissue of Perdue's first novel, Lee. A new edition was published by Standard American in 2023.

== Reception ==
Publishers Weekly praises the book's "funny scenes and arresting lines." In the Los Angeles Times, Antoine Wilson praises its "utterly charming and brilliantly comic penultimate scene" but also complains of "tone-deaf caricature" in passages where "satirical elements take center stage."

Both Kirkus Reviews and Publishers Weekly compare the novel to those of Samuel Beckett; but the latter finds that it lacks Beckett's "lyricism."

In the Quarterly Review, Derek Turner judges it "without a doubt the strangest" of Perdue's books yet published. Don Noble notes its "highly literate, idiosyncratic diction," while Turner finds it "difficult to know how to do justice to a book that combines ... courtly archaisms with crude street slang ... philosophical points ... with haemorrhoid-related humour."

== Series ==
The main character, Lee Pefley, and his forebears appear in many of Perdue's novels.
