= Edward Draper =

Edward Alured Draper (22 October 1776 in Oxfordshire, United Kingdom – 22 April 1841 in Rivière Noire, Mauritius) was a military officer in the British Army and civil servant in Mauritius.

== Life ==
Draper was educated at Eton College. In 1793 he matriculated at Brasenose College, Oxford.

=== Military career ===
In 1796, he became Lieutenant, then Captain in the British Army, and he served in West Indies and Egypt. As a brevet major, he brought home the despatches after the capture of St. Lucia in 1803. One of the people he knew in the Caribbean was Sir Thomas Picton, who served as governor of Trinidad. Picton was tried in England for permitting the torture of Luisa Calderón in Trinidad. Picton did not deny the use of torture, but Draper defended him and became involved in a pamphlet war, issuing an "Address to the British Public". Draper was jailed for three months for libelling Picton's accusers, and had the consolation of being visited by the Prince Regent, whom he seems to have met as a page. A few years later he was again in the limelight as ADC. He retired from the army as colonel.

=== Mauritius ===
In 1812, he came to Mauritius. In the same year, he founded the Mauritius Turf Club and initiated racing at Champ de Mars Racecourse. For a short period he was appointed Chief Secretary in Bourbon Island.

Back in Mauritius, Draper served in different capacities, namely as Chief of Police, Colonial Secretary, Collector of Customs, Civil engineer, Registrar of Slaves, Magistrate and Colonial Treasurer. In 1818, he was suspended by General Cage Hall but once more his powerful friends in England came to his rescue and Draper was reinstated. In 1822 he married a Mauritian lady named Lucie de Krivelt. Draper supported the Mauritian planters against the British official in respect of slaves trade and the abolition of slavery issues.

Dismissed by Governor Nicolay in 1832, Draper was sent back to England. In 1836, he was back again in Mauritius, this time appointed Colonial Treasurer and Paymaster General. He died on 22 April 1841 and was buried at Riviere Noire.

== Sources ==
- Stephen, Leslie, ed. (1888). "Draper, Edward Alured" . Dictionary of National Biography. Vol. 16. London: Smith, Elder & Co.
- Anniversaries and events, from the Mauritius philatelic bureau
