= Champ de Mars Racecourse =

Horse race track in Port Louis, Mauritius

Champ de Mars
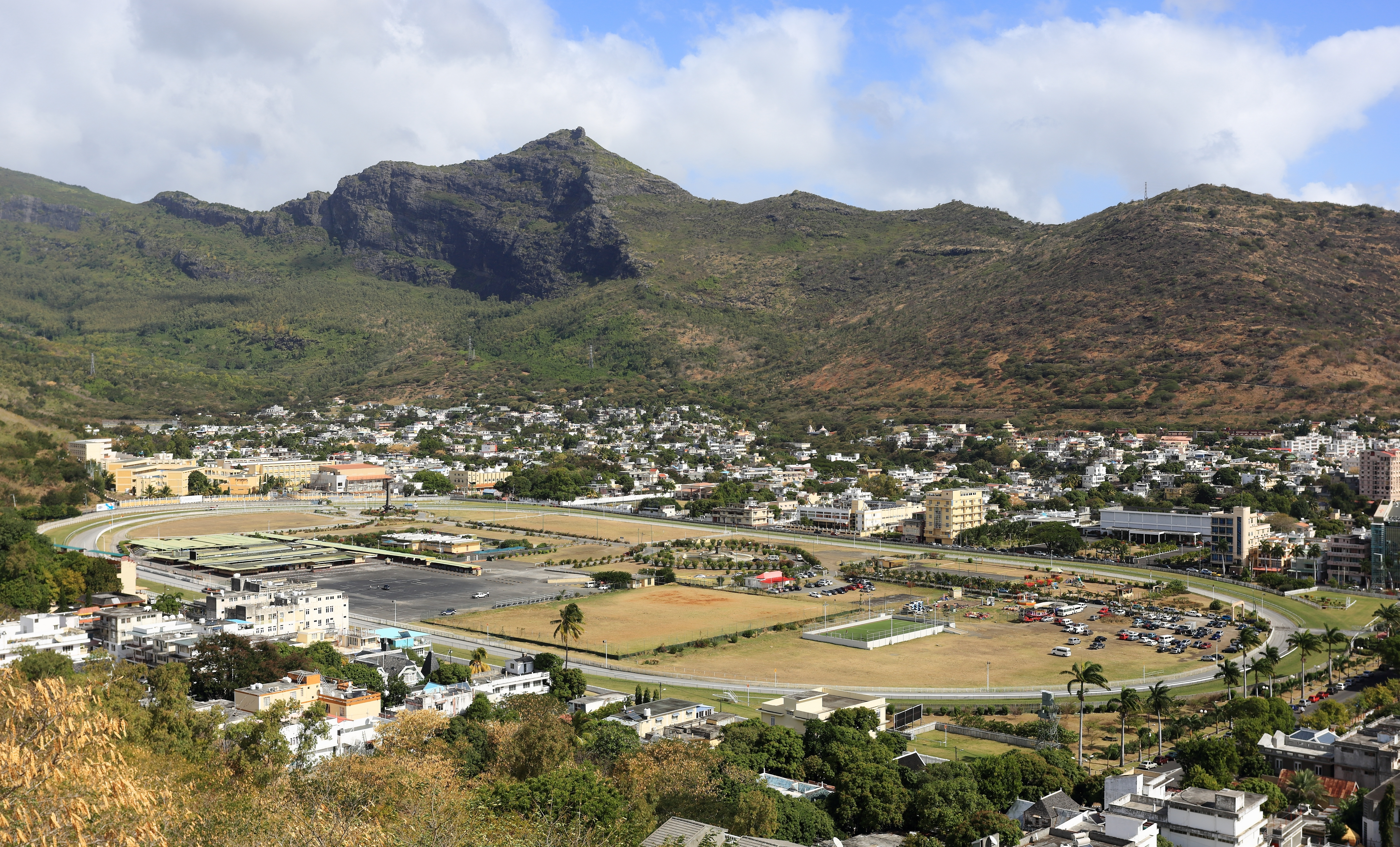
- The Champ de Mars Racecourse
- Interactive map of Champ de Mars
- Location: Port Louis, Mauritius
- Coordinates: 20.169159°S 57.510089°E
- Owned by: Mauritius Turf Club
- Date opened: 1812
- Race type: Flat
- Notable races: Barbé Cup; Duchess of York Cup; Duke of York Cup; Maiden Cup

The Champ de Mars Racecourse (French: Hippodrome du Champ de Mars) is a thoroughbred horse race track in Port Louis, Mauritius. The Racecourse was inaugurated on 25 June 1812, by The Mauritius Turf Club (MTC) which was founded earlier the same year by Edward Alured Draper, who served in different capacities, namely as Chief of Police, Colonial Secretary, Collector of Customs, Civil engineer, Registrar of Slaves, Magistrate and Colonial Treasurer. The Mauritius Turf Club is the oldest horse-racing club in the Southern Hemisphere and the second oldest in the world. The race track follows a very selective right hand oval path and is relatively small in size, with a circumference of 1,298 metres (4,259 ft) and width between 12 and 14 metres (39 and 46 ft). The home-straight extends uphill and is 225 metres (738 ft) long. When Mauritius gained independence on 12 March 1968, the event including the flag hoisting ceremony was held here. Since then and for many years, the racecourse has seen the annual celebration of the accession to independence.

Today, the Champ de Mars attracts tens of thousands of people on each racing day during the racing season from late March to early December and has become the ultimate meeting place for racing fanatics from all over the island and even from abroad. The track has also played a fundamental role in propelling horse racing as the most popular sport and form of entertainment among the local population.

== History ==
Before 1810, the area was a military training ground for French troops. The aim of the founders of the Mauritius Turf Club to set up horse racing at the Champ de Mars was to reconcile the French settlers with the English administration who had conquered the island in December 1810. They were convinced that the convivial atmosphere of horse racing would foster unity between the two communities and ensure social peace and harmony after years of fighting in the Indian Ocean. The new Governor, Sir Robert Farquhar and his wife of French origin, Maria Lautour, actively supported the organization of horse racing, the latter offering the first gold cup after the club's history to mark the occasion.

When he came to Mauritius, Colonel Edward Draper enthusiastically promoted horse racing at the Champ de Mars for some twenty years, racing his own thoroughbreds, often riding them in competition, to the point that he became known as the “Father” of the Mauritius Turf Club.

The main road leading to it is known to racing enthusiasts as “Rue Government”, and the Champ de Mars racecourse is at the foot of hills. It is the oldest racecourse in the southern hemisphere and the second oldest in the world. Within its premises stands a statue of King Edward VII by the sculptor Prosper d’Épinay, and the Malartic Tomb, an obelisk to a French governor.

In the 19th century, the only permanent boxes at the Champ de Mars were those reserved for the Governor, the Mayor of Port Louis and MTC officials. Temporary boxes were built and hired on the spot on race days, and over the years, new boxes were erected. In 1906 the MTC purchased a wooden house at 26, Pope Hennessy Street, Port Louis and it served as MTC offices for about forty years. Permanent stands were built in 1909 and they were improved in 1927, 1939 and 1954. During the past decades, new facilities were added while retaining the colonial aspects of the racecourse.

The attendance record at the Champ de Mars was set in 1984 when more than 100,000 people turned up at the Maiden Cup, the most prestigious race in the Mauritian racing calendar. Nippy Regen, owned by the Gujadhur stable, won the race and was ridden by Adrian Walkinshaw.

Notable royal visits include those of Queen Elizabeth II; Princess Margaret, Countess of Snowdon; and Prince William, Duke of Cambridge

== Gallery ==
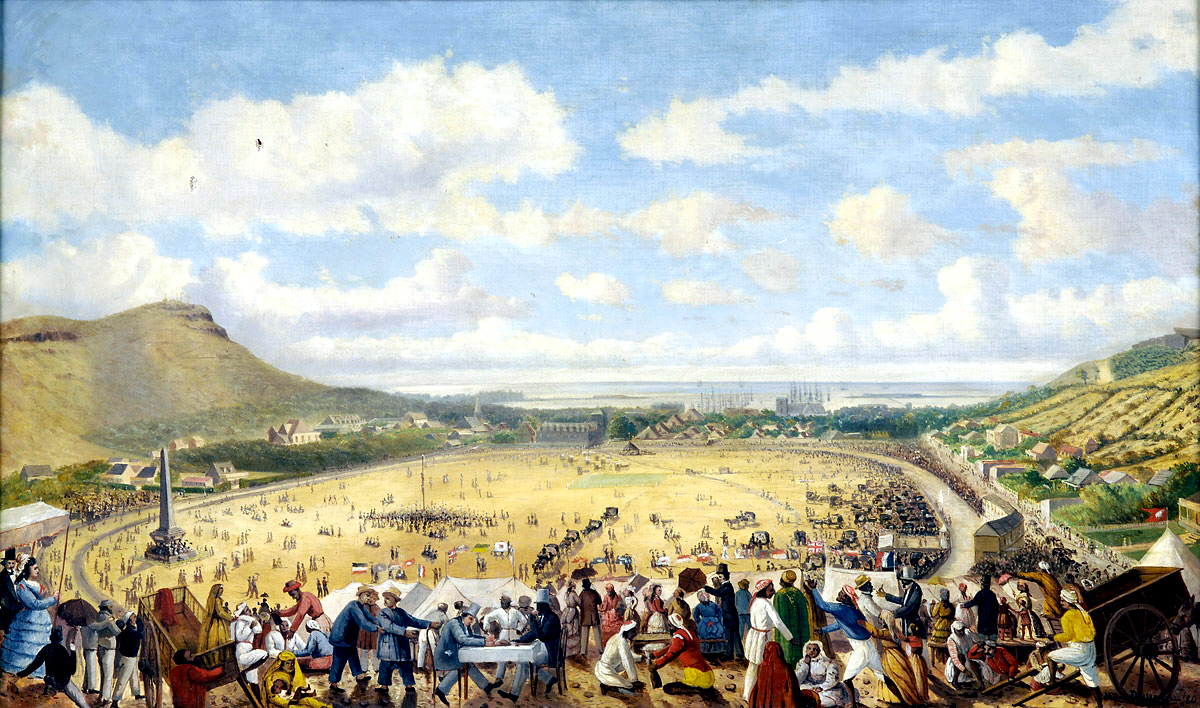
The Champ de Mars in 1880

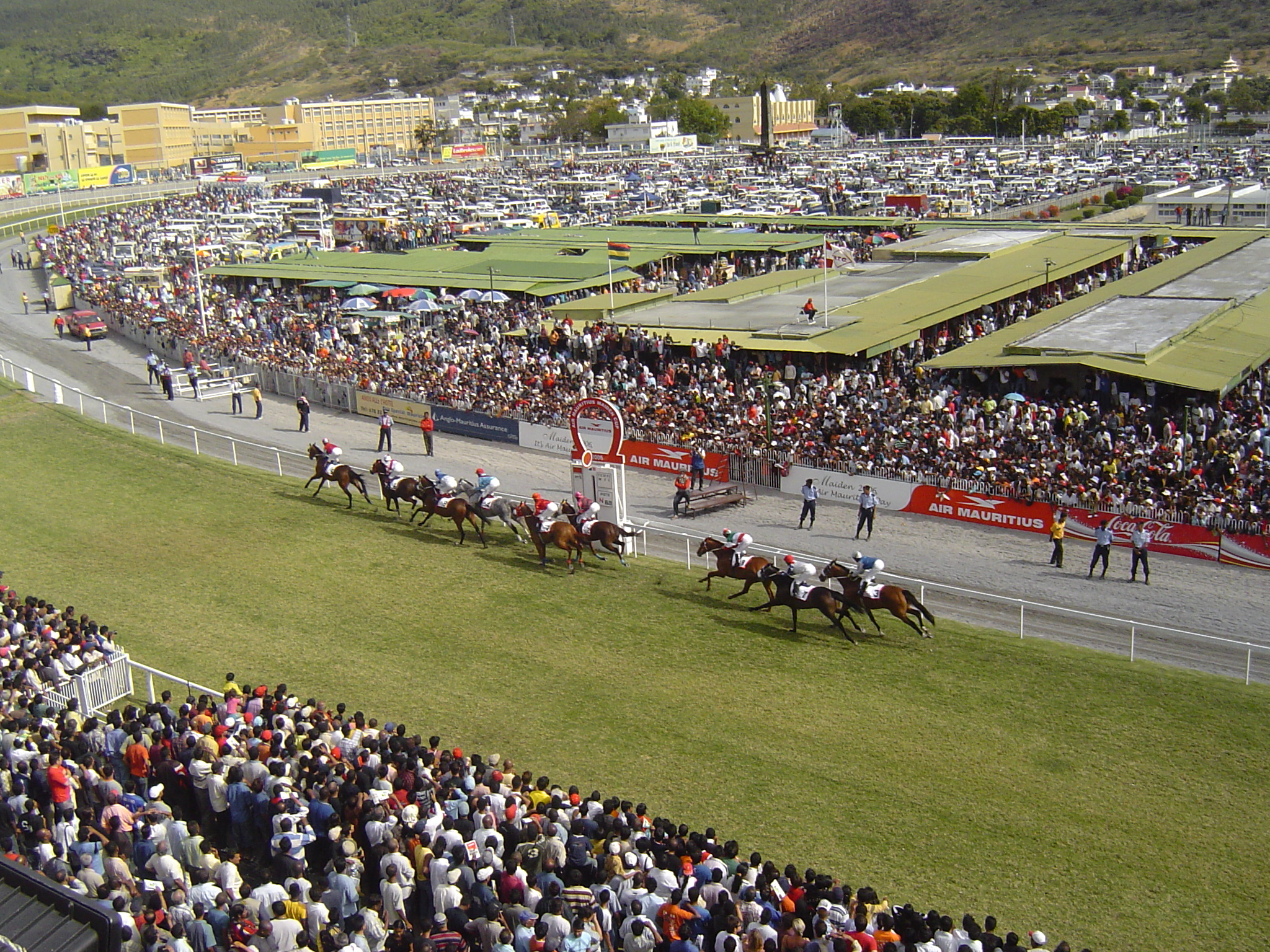
Maiden Cup 2006 - To The Line, winner of the race

== See also ==
- List of horse racing venues
