= William Fullarton =

Scottish soldier

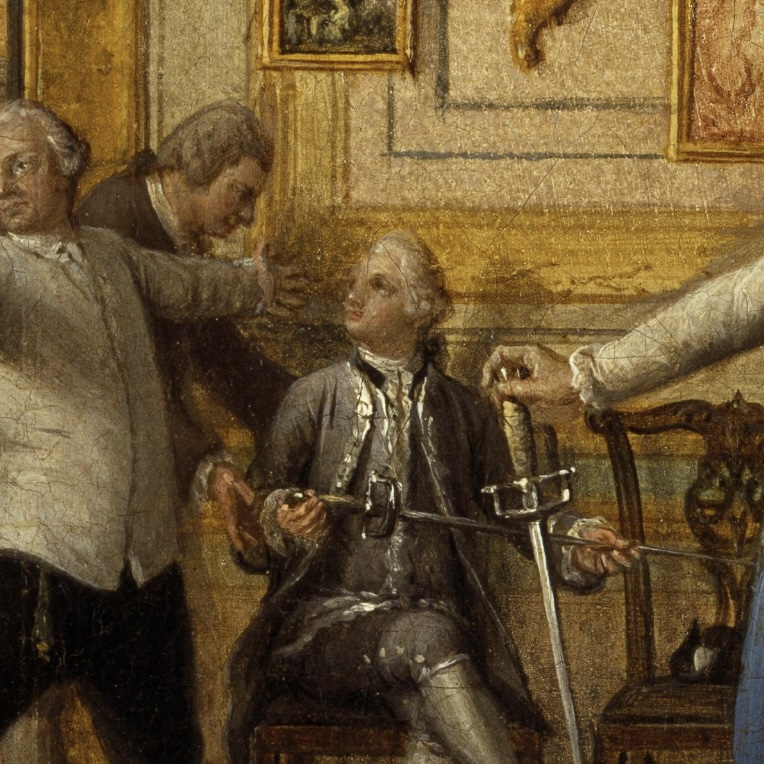
“Colonel” William Fullarton. (The background seated man.)

Colonel William Fullarton of Fullarton FRSE FRS (12 January 1754 – 13 February 1808) was a Scottish soldier, statesman, agriculturalist and author. He sat in the House of Commons between 1779 and 1803.

== Early life ==
He was born on 12 January 1754 the only son of William Fullarton of Fullarton, a wealthy Ayrshire gentleman. After spending some time at the University of Edinburgh he was sent to travel on the continent with Patrick Brydone, at one time the travelling tutor of William Beckford, and visited Sicily and Malta. Fullarton was at first intended for the diplomatic service, and was attached as secretary to Lord Stormont's embassy in Paris; but on his accession to the family estates he went to England and secured his election to parliament for the borough of Plympton Erle in 1779.

== Military commander in India ==
In the following year he did not seek re-election, for he had combined a plan of operations which the government accepted. This plan was that he and his intimate friend, Thomas Humberston Mackenzie, should each raise and equip a regiment on their Scottish estates at their own expense, which should be transported in government ships towards the coast of Mexico, in order to wait for and capture the Acapulco fleet. The regiments were accordingly raised, and Fullarton was gazetted lieutenant-colonel-commandant of the 98th Regiment on 29 May 1780.

The outbreak of the Fourth Anglo-Dutch War changed the destination of these regiments, which were then ordered to form part of the expedition against the Cape of Good Hope under the command of Commodore George Johnstone and General William Medows. This plan also came to nothing, owing to the arrival of the French admiral, the Bailli de Suffren, at the Cape before the British expedition.

The regiments then went on to India, to take their part in the Second Anglo-Mysore War against Haidar Ali. Mackenzie's regiment disembarked at Calicut, to make a diversion by invading Mysore from the Malabar coast, while Fullarton's went round to Madras. He remained in the neighbourhood of the capital of the presidency until after the Battle of Porto Novo, when he was sent south in command of the king's troops, in order if possible to attract the Mysore troops away from the Carnatic.

In June 1782 Fullarton was gazetted a colonel in the army for the East Indies, with Sir Robert Barker, Norman Macleod, John Floyd, and many others, in order to put an end to the perpetual disputes between the king's and the company's officers, and he co-operated in the winter campaign of 1782–3 in the suppression of the Kollars, the fighting tribes of Madura, and in the capture of Karur and Dindigal. Fullarton led the Madras Army against the rebel Kattaboman, a palaiyakarar of Panchalum Kurucchi, a fortress town in present-day Tinnevelly District of Tamil Nadu. Fullarton's name is associated with the destruction of the fort of the rebel chieftain at Nettkelcheval, again in Tinnevelly District. In May 1783 he succeeded to the general command of all the troops south of the Coleroon, and on 2 June he took Dharapuram. He then advanced towards General James Stuart, who was besieging Cuddalore.

On the news of the fall of that city, he determined to attack Pálghát, which had resisted all the efforts of Mackenzie in the previous year. He had to make his way through a dense forest. When he got through it, he had to storm the city. There, he heard that Tippoo Sultan, who had succeeded Haidar Ali on the throne, was not fulfilling the terms agreed to at the surrender of Mangalore, and Fullarton accordingly followed up his success by the capture of the fortress of Coimbatore. At this time, he was imperatively ordered to cease all hostilities by the government of Madras, and a sort of peace was patched up between the company and Tippoo Sahib.

James Mill praised Fullarton as the first Anglo-Indian commander who looked after his commissariat and organised a system for obtaining intelligence of the enemy's strength and whereabouts. Fullarton returned to England, where he published his polemical tract A View of English Interests in India in 1787. This work, addressed to David Murray, 2nd Earl of Mansfield (previously Lord Stormont), attacked the policies of the East India Company.

== Later life ==
He then settled down to a country life, and married Marianne Mackay, daughter of George Mackay, 5th Lord Reay. He took an interest in agricultural questions, and published two memoirs on the state of agriculture in Ayrshire and the advantages of pasture land. He was elected a fellow of the Royal Society of London and Royal Society of Edinburgh. He never again undertook service, but raised the 23rd, or Fullarton's dragoons, in 1794, and the 101st, or Fullarton's foot, in 1800, both of the regiments being reduced at the Peace of Amiens in 1802. He continued his parliamentary career, with a low profile, and sat for the Haddington Burghs from 1787 to 1790, for Horsham from 1793 to 1796, and for Ayrshire from 1796 to April 1803.

He was appointed first commissioner for the government of the island of Trinidad. The commission appointed for Trinidad consisted of Fullarton, Captain Samuel Hood of the Royal Navy, and Lieutenant-Colonel Thomas Picton, who had ruled the island since its capture by Sir Ralph Abercromby in 1797. When Fullarton asked for an account of all the criminal proceedings which had taken place in the island since Picton had been there, Picton resigned in disgust. Fullarton persisted in his inquiries, and the result of them was the trial of Picton for inflicting torture on a girl, Luisa Calderon, to extort a confession from her. This trial caused a public sensation in England. In February 1806, Picton was found guilty. Fullarton was attacked in print by Edward Alured Draper, as was John Sullivan. Picton applied for a new trial, at which he was acquitted; but before it started Fullarton died of inflammation of the lungs at Gordon's Hotel, London, on 13 February 1808. He was buried at Isleworth.

== Publications ==
- View of English Interest in India (1787)

== Sources ==
- William John Wilson (1882). History of the Madras army, Volume 2. E. Keys at the Government Press. p. 72.

Attribution

- This article incorporates text from a publication now in the public domain: "Fullarton, William". Dictionary of National Biography. London: Smith, Elder & Co. 1885–1900.

Parliament of Great Britain
Preceded by Sir Richard Philipps; John Durand	Member of Parliament for Plympton Erle; 1779–1780; With: John Durand	Succeeded by Viscount Cranborne; Sir Ralph Payne
Preceded by Francis Charteris	Member of Parliament for Haddington Burghs; 1787–1790	Succeeded by Thomas Maitland
Preceded by Lord William Gordon; James Baillie	Member of Parliament for Horsham; 1793–1796; With: Lord William Gordon	Succeeded by Sir John Macpherson; James Fox-Lane
Preceded by Hugh Montgomerie	Member of Parliament for Ayrshire; 1796–1801	Parliament replaced
Parliament of the United Kingdom
New parliament	Member of Parliament for Ayrshire; 1801–1803	Succeeded by Sir Hew Dalrymple-Hamilton
