= Nationalism and Ethnic Conflict =

1994 book

- Editor: Charles P. Cozic
- Language: English
- Series: Current Controversies
- Genre: Non-fiction
- Publisher: Greenhaven Press
- Publication date: 1994
- Publication place: United States
- Media type: Book
- Pages: 228
- ISBN: 1-56510-080-8

Nationalism and Ethnic Conflict is a 1994 book in the Current Controversies series, presenting selections of contrasting viewpoints on five central questions about nationalism and ethnic conflict: whether nationalism is beneficial; whether ethnic violence is ever justified; what the causes of ethnic conflict are; whether nations should intervene in ethnic conflicts; and how ethnic conflict can be prevented. It was edited by Charles P. Cozic.

It was published by Greenhaven Press (San Diego) in 1994 as a 288-page hardcover (ISBN 1-56510-080-8) and paperback (ISBN 1-56510-079-4).

== Reception ==
A review in Booklist stated "this collection of 41 short essays drawn from a variety of sources is arranged thematically into five topical chapters" and called the book "[a]n effective page format includes boxed quotations that can pique reader interest." The School Library Journal called the book "A timely look at contemporary world problems" and said, "Many of the authoritative essays on nationalism are scholarly and overburdened with sophisticated vocabulary, while articles and interviews on ethnic violence in Northern Ireland, Bosnia, and the Arab world are compelling and at times gruesome. A challenging but nonetheless excellent resource for research or debate students."
