= Glyn Parry (author) =

Australian writer

- Born: 1959 (age 66–67); England
- Writing career
- Period: 1992-present
- Genres: Children's literature, young adult fiction, speculative fiction
- Website: glynparry.blogspot.com

Glyn Parry is an Australian writer of children's literature, young adult fiction, and speculative fiction.

== Biography ==
Parry was born in 1959 in the north-east of England. At the age of 12 he moved to Lynwood, Western Australia where he attended Kinlock Primary School and then Rossmoyne Senior High School. Parry met his wife at a Friday night youth group with whom he raised three children. He has worked as a high school English teacher. In 1992 Parry's first novel was published entitled L.A. Postcards. In 1995 his second novel Radical Take-offs won the Premier's Prize and the award for best Children's & Young Adult's Books at the Western Australian Premier's Book Awards. Parry again won an award at the Western Australian Premier's Book Awards with his work Scooterboy winning the Young Adults Award. He is now currently living in West Toodyay, Western Australia.

== Awards and nominations ==
Year	Award	Work	Category	Result
1995	Western Australian Premier's Book Awards	Radical Take-offs	Premier's Prize	Won
1995	Western Australian Premier's Book Awards	Radical Take-offs	Children's & Young Adult's Books	Won
1998	Aurealis Award	"Dawn Chorus"	Best horror short story	Nomination
1999	Western Australian Premier's Book Awards	Scooterboy	Young Adults	Won
2002	Western Australian Premier's Book Awards	Harry & Luke (with Caroline Magerl)	Children's Book	Nomination

== Bibliography ==
=== Novels ===
- L.A. Postcards (1992)
- Monster Man (1994)
- Radical Take-offs (1994)
- Mosh (1996)
- Spooking the Cows (2002)
- Sad Boys (1998)
- Scooterboy (1999)
- Ocean Road (2007)

=== Non-fiction ===
- Stoked!: Real Life, Real Surf (1994)

=== Chapter books ===
- Harry & Luke (2002, illustrations by Caroline Magerl)

=== Collections ===
- Invisible Girl: Stories (2003)

=== Short fiction ===
- "Dawn Chorus" (1998) in Fantastic Worlds (ed. Paul Collins)
- "Past Midnight" (1999) in Last Gasps (ed. Paul Collins, Meredith Costain)
