= Gayle Greeno =

American fantasy author (born 1949)

Gayle Greeno (born 1949 in New York City) is an American fantasy author.

== Bibliography ==
=== Ghatti's Tale ===
- Finders Seekers (1993)
- MindSpeaker's Call (1994)
- Exiles' Return (1995)

=== Ghattens' Gambit ===
- Sunderlies Seeking (1998)
- The Farthest Seeking (2000)

=== Non-series novels ===
- Mind Snare (1997)
