= Louis Edwards (author) =

American novelist

- Born: Lake Charles, Louisiana, U.S.
- Education: Louisiana State University
- Occupation: Novelist
- Writing career
- Genre: Fiction
- Notable awards: Whiting Award (1994)
- Website: louisjedwards.com

Louis Edwards is an American novelist.

== Life ==
Edwards was born in Lake Charles, Louisiana. He graduated from Louisiana State University (LSU) in 1984 with a degree in journalism. He also attended Hunter College (City University of New York) for his junior year.

While in graduate school studying English literature at LSU, he began writing his first novel, Ten Seconds, which would eventually be published by Graywolf Press in 1991.

In 1993 and 1994, respectively, he received a Guggenheim Fellowship and a Whiting Award for his fiction. In August 2021, Amistad/HarperCollins will publish his fourth novel, Ramadan Ramsey.

He lives in New Orleans.

== Career ==
In addition to being an author, Edwards has had a successful, decades-long career in the music and entertainment industry. Since the mid-1980s he has worked for Festival Productions, Inc. in New Orleans (1986–present). The company produces the annual New Orleans Jazz & Heritage Festival among other events. He has worked on a wide variety of music festivals, such as the JVC Jazz Festival-New York (1987–1994), the Essence Festival (1995–2007), as well as events in Washington, D.C., Philadelphia, Los Angeles, Houston, and many other cities.

He is currently the Chief Creative Officer and the Chief Marketing Officer at Festival Productions, overseeing advertising and marketing, public relations, Internet and social media, corporate sponsorships, and merchandise.

== Works ==
- Ten Seconds (Graywolf Press, 1991), ISBN 9781555971502
- N: A Romantic Mystery (Dutton, 1997), ISBN 9780525941828
- Oscar Wilde Discovers America (Scribner, 2003), ISBN 9780743236898
- Ramadan Ramsey (Amistad/HarperCollins, 2021)
