= Stewart James =

Canadian inventor (1908–1996)

- Born: John George Stewart James; May 14, 1908; Courtright, Ontario
- Died: November 5, 1996 (aged 88)

Stewart James (May 14, 1908 – November 5, 1996) was a Canadian postman who became one of magic's most prolific inventors. He spent most of his life in Courtright, Ontario.

== Biography ==
Stewart James was highly respected for his creativity and invention of magic tricks; inventions of James's are used by many magicians despite his low name recognition Martin Gardner described him as "a magician who has probably devised more high-quality mathematical card tricks than anyone who ever lived". James ran a publishing company named Jogestja, Ltd.

== Books ==
- One More Thought on Cards (1955)
- Compiled and edited the Abbott Encyclopedia of Rope Tricks
  - Abbott's Encyclopedia of Rope Tricks, Vol. 1 (1941)
  - Abbott's Encyclopedia of Rope Tricks, Vol. 2 (1968)
  - Abbott's Encyclopedia of Rope Tricks, Vol. 3 (1980)
- Stewart James in Print: The First 50 Years (1989), edited by P. Howard Lyons and Allan Slaight
- The James File, Vol. 1 and 2 (2000) by Allan Slaight, contains nearly 1700 pages of Stewart James's magic.
- The Essential Stewart James (2007)

== Awards ==
- The Academy of Magical Arts Creative Fellowship (1981)
