= Thomas Picton =

British Army officer (1758–1815)

Lieutenant-General Sir Thomas Picton GCB
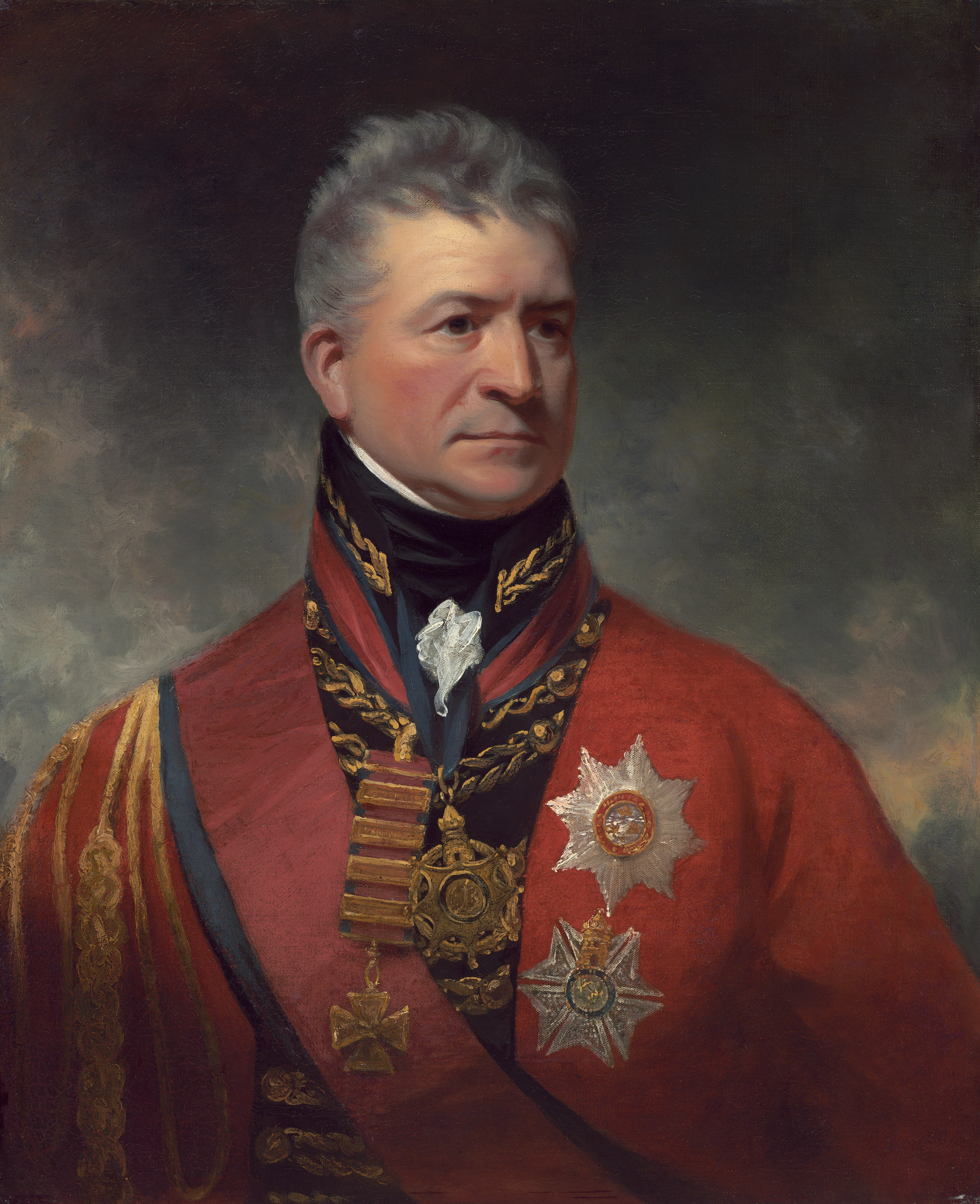
- Portrait of Thomas Picton by Sir William Beechey, c. 1815
- Born: 24 August 1758; Haverfordwest, Pembrokeshire, Wales
- Died: 18 June 1815 (aged 56); Waterloo, United Kingdom of the Netherlands
- Burial place: St George's, Hanover Square, London (later reburied at St Paul's Cathedral)
- Military career
- Allegiance: Great Britain; United Kingdom
- Branch: British Army
- Service years: 1771–1815
- Rank: Lieutenant-General
- Conflicts: French Revolutionary Wars; Napoleonic Wars †
- Awards: Knight Grand Cross of the Order of the Bath

Lieutenant-General Sir Thomas Picton GCB (24 August 1758 – 18 June 1815) was a British Army officer and colonial administrator. He fought in the Napoleonic Wars and died at the Battle of Waterloo. According to the historian Alessandro Barbero, Picton was "respected for his courage and feared for his irascible temperament". The Duke of Wellington called him "a rough foul-mouthed devil as ever lived", but found him capable.

While Picton's military prowess is not in doubt, as a colonial administrator he was considered to be a harsh disciplinarian, even by some at the time. He approved the use of torture during his governorship of Trinidad. He was put on trial in England for approving the picketing of a 14-year-old girl, Luisa Calderón, and convicted. He later had a retrial arguing that Trinidad was subject to Spanish law, in which no judgement was ever reached by the jury.

Controversy over Picton's use of torture has revived in recent years, and his role in the Atlantic slave trade has also come under scrutiny (he was a slave owner who was involved in slave catching). In 2020, Cardiff Council voted to remove his statue in the "Heroes of Wales" gallery in City Hall. In the same year, it was reported that a plaque was removed from his birthplace. In 2022, the National Museum Cardiff relocated his portrait from its "Faces of Wales" gallery to a side room, accompanied by descriptions of his brutal treatment of the people of Trinidad. The town of Picton in New Zealand, named after him, has considered reverting to its Māori name in response to his actions as governor of Trinidad.

Picton is also remembered for his exploits under Wellington in the Iberian Peninsular War of 1807–1814, during which he displayed great bravery and persistence. He was killed in 1815 fighting at the Battle of Waterloo whilst commanding the 5th Infantry Division. During a crucial stage in the battle he was ordered by Wellington to intervene in the Allied centre, which was beginning to buckle under the weight of a heavy French assault. Picton led the 5th division in aggressive counter-advance which stopped d'Erlon's corps' attack against the allied centre left. The manoeuvre cost Picton his life when he was struck through the head by French shot. His body was carried from the field by soldiers of the 32nd Foot whom he had led in a bayonet charge against the French line. He was the most senior officer to die at Waterloo. At the time of his death he was a sitting Member of Parliament.

== Early life ==
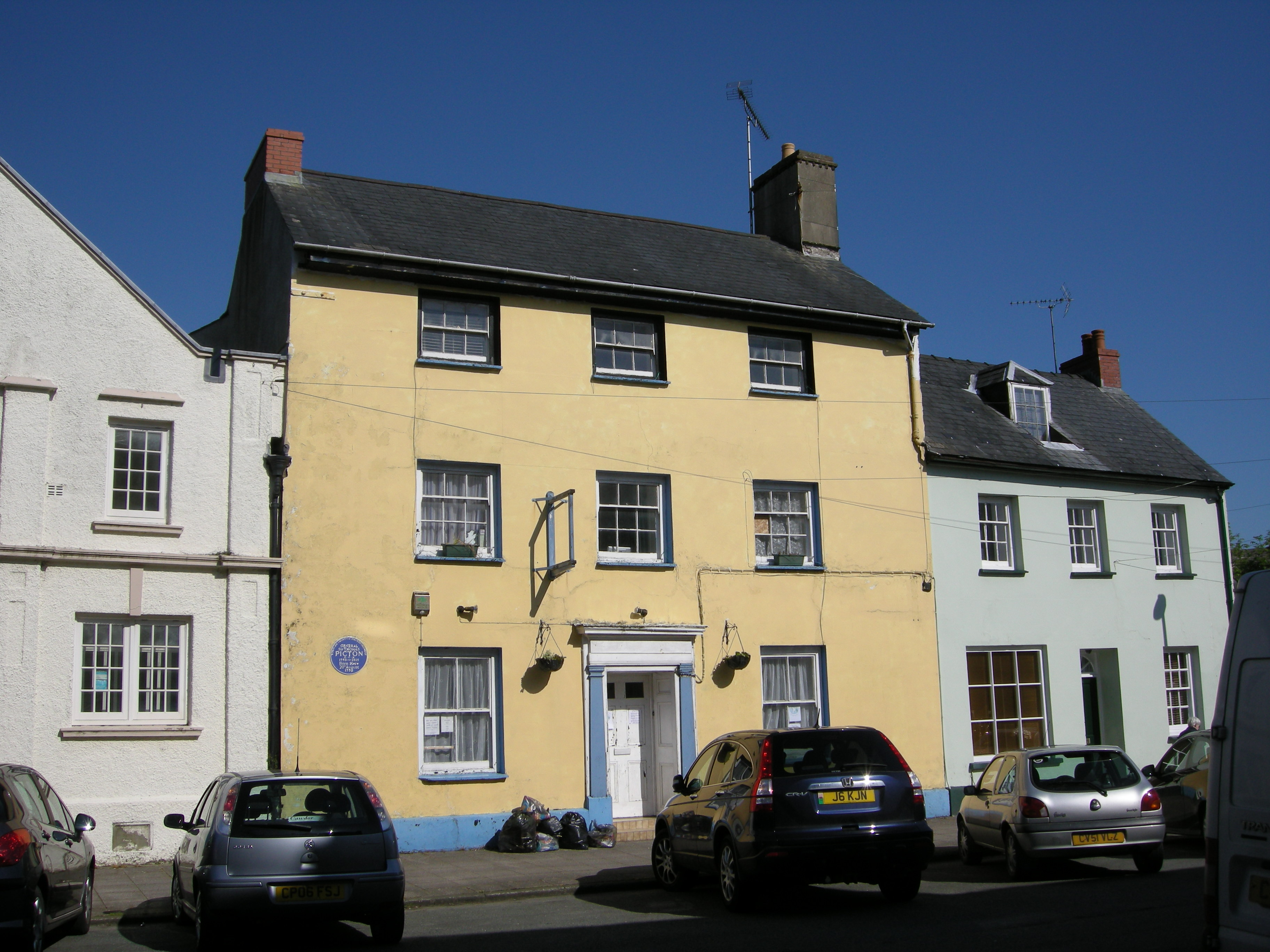
Picton's birthplace in Hill Street, Haverfordwest, marked with a commemorative blue plaque. The house later became the Dragon Hotel.

Thomas Picton was the seventh of 12 children of Thomas Picton (1723–1790) of Poyston Hall, Pembrokeshire, Wales, and his wife, Cecil née Powell (1728–1806). He was born in Haverfordwest, Pembrokeshire on (probably) 24 August 1758. In 1771 he obtained an ensign's commission in the 12th Regiment of Foot, but he did not join until two years later. The regiment was then stationed at Gibraltar, where he remained until he was made captain in the 75th Regiment of Foot (Prince of Wales's Regiment) in January 1778, at which point he then returned to Britain.

The regiment was disbanded five years later. Picton quelled a mutiny amongst the men by his prompt personal action and courage, and was promised the rank of major as a reward. He did not receive it, and after living in retirement on his father's estate for nearly 12 years, he went out to the West Indies in 1794 on the strength of a slight acquaintance with Sir John Vaughan, the commander-in-chief, who made him his aide-de-camp and gave him a captaincy in the 17th Regiment of Foot. Shortly afterwards he was promoted major in the 58th Regiment of Foot.

== Career in the New World ==
Under Sir Ralph Abercromby, who succeeded Vaughan in 1795, Picton was present at the capture of Saint Lucia, after which he was promoted to lieutenant colonel of the 56th Regiment of Foot, and then that of St Vincent.

After the invasion of Trinidad in 1797, Abercromby made Picton governor of the island. For the next five years he held the island with a garrison he considered inadequate against the threats of internal unrest and of reconquest by the Spanish. He ensured order by vigorous action, viewed variously as rough-and-ready justice or as arbitrary brutality. Picton was accused of the execution of a dozen slaves, and the slave trade was partly behind his considerable fortune. Historian Chris Evans said, "Delinquents who were sent for immediate execution might consider themselves lucky; others had to endure mutilation and torture."

In October 1801 he was gazetted to the local rank of brigadier-general. During the negotiations leading to the Peace of Amiens of 1802, many of the British inhabitants of Trinidad petitioned against the return of the island to Spain; this together with Picton's and Abercromby's representations, ensured its retention as a British possession.

By then, reports of arbitrariness and brutality associated with his governorship had led to a demand at home for his removal. Picton was also making money from speculation in land and slaves, and his free coloured mistress and mother of four of his children, Rosetta Smith, was believed to be corruptly influencing his decisions. Furthermore, Trinidad no longer faced any external threat, the Pitt ministry had fallen and the new Addington administration did not want Trinidad to develop the plantation economy Picton favoured. In 1802, William Fullarton (1754–1808) was appointed as the Senior Member of a commission to govern the island, Samuel Hood became the second member, and Picton himself the junior.

Fullarton had a very different background from Picton. He came from a wealthy and long-established Scots land-owning family and was a Whig MP, a Fellow of the Royal Society, an improving landlord, and a patron of Robert Burns. He had been a junior diplomat before raising a regiment in the course of the American War of Independence, of which he naturally became the Colonel. He ended that war in India, commanding an army of 14,000 men in operations against Tippu Sultan. Afterwards he had written an influential pamphlet arguing that the East India Company had brought trouble on itself by its unprincipled treatment of native princes and native subjects, and that a more humane policy would be preferable to "let them hate so long as they fear" (a favourite motto of Caligula).

Picton's policy with respect to various sections of the island population had effectively been one of rule by fear, and he and Fullarton rapidly fell out. (This, of itself, further worsened the rift: Fullarton's Indian pamphlet had also reported adversely on conflicts of interest and dissension between the English having weakened their ability to govern well, to negotiate effectively, and to effectively defend their possessions.) Fullarton commenced a series of open enquiries on allegations against Picton and reported his unfavourable views on Picton's past actions at length to meetings of the commission. Picton thereupon tendered his resignation on 31 May 1803.

== Arrest and trials ==
Picton joined Hood in military operations in Saint Lucia and Tobago, before returning to Britain to face charges brought by Fullarton. In December 1803 he was arrested by order of the Privy Council and promptly released on bail set at £40,000.

The Privy Council dealt with the majority of the charges against Picton. Those charges related principally to accusations of excessive cruelty in the detection and punishment of practitioners of Obeah, severity to slaves, and of execution of suspects out of hand without due process. Only the latter class of charge seems to have seriously worried the Privy Council. Here Picton's argument carried the day: that either the laws of Trinidad (then still the laws of the former Spanish colonial power: Abercromby had specifically instructed Picton to conduct himself according to those laws) or "the state of the garrison" (martial law) justified the immediate execution in the cases specified.

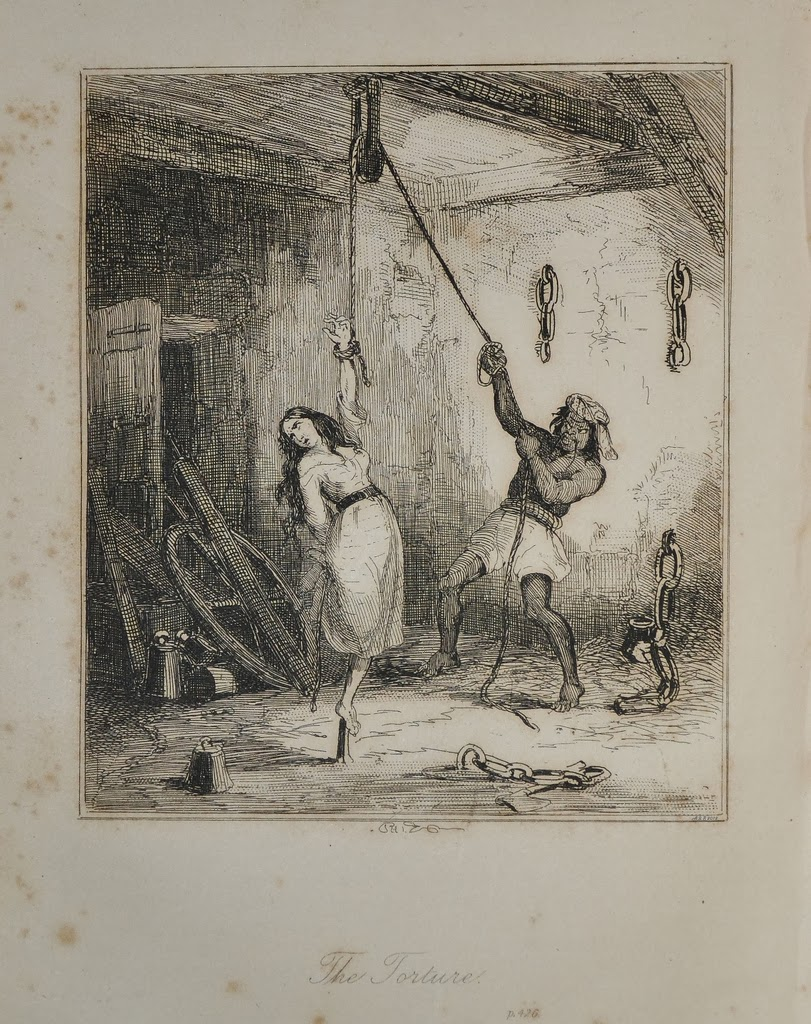
Luisa Calderón being tortured, as illustrated in one of the many prints at the time

Picton was, however, tried in the Court of King's Bench before Lord Ellenborough in 1806 on a single charge: the misdemeanour of having in 1801 caused torture to be unlawfully inflicted to extract a confession from Luisa Calderón, a 14-year-old free mulatto girl suspected of assisting one of her lovers to burgle the house of the man with whom she was living, making off with about £500. Torture (but not the specific form) had been requested in writing by a local magistrate and approved in writing by Picton. The torture applied ("picketing") was a version of a British military punishment and consisted in principle of compelling the trussed-up suspect to stand on one toe on a flat-headed peg for one hour on many occasions within a span of a few days. Calderón was subjected to one session of 55 minutes, and a second of 25 minutes the following day. The young girl was suspended by one arm on a pulley rope set in the ceiling and lowered onto a peg in the floor, bare foot first. This continued until her entire body weight rested on the peg. She did not confess and was imprisoned for a further eight months before being released.

The period between Picton's return and the trial had seen a pamphlet war between the rival camps, and the widespread sale of engravings showing a curious British public what an attractive 14-year-old mulatto girl being trussed up and tortured in a state of semi-undress might look like. At the trial, Luisa Calderón gave evidence in person ("Her appearance was extremely interesting, and her countenance, which was that of a mulatto, extremely prepossessing and agreeable") of the nature and duration of her picketing. The legal arguments, however, revolved on whether Spanish law permitted torture of suspects. Picton's defence, led by Robert Dallas, was damaged by the cross-examination of his witnesses:

Mr Bourville was examined relative to the nature of the office of alkald, or justice at Trinidad. On his cross examination by William Garrow, he said, the first introduction of torture was by General Picton ... Mr Gloucester, the Attorney-General at Trinidad, verified several books as books of authority, in which it was expressly laid down, that by the Spanish law torture might be inflicted; these books were, the Borvillia, the Curia Phillipion, and the Elesando. On his cross-examination he admitted that the Caedula and Raecopilazione were also books of authority. They contained a code expressly applicable to the Spanish West India Islands, and there was not a word about torture in them.

On this, and the evidence presented by the prosecution, the jury decided that Spanish law did not permit torture of suspects, and found Picton guilty.

Picton promptly sought a retrial, which he got in 1808. At the first trial Dallas had been denied access to the Raecopilazione. At the second trial, Dallas, still Picton's counsel, stressed that the use of torture had been requested by the local magistrate, that there were copious authorities showing its legality under Spanish law, and that Calderón had been old enough to be legally tortured. Against the argument that torture was legal under the laws of Spain, but nowhere authorised by those of its colonies, he presented a considerable body of depositions from inhabitants of Trinidad showing that torture had frequently been resorted to by magistrates in the last years of Spanish occupation. The jury found that torture was authorised by the law of the island at the time of the cession, and that the defendant acted without malice, further than making an order which he thought himself bound to comply with. They therefore reversed the verdict of the earlier trial but asked for the full court to consider the further argument of the prosecution that torture of a free person was so repugnant to the laws of England that Picton must have known he could not permit it, whatever Spanish law authorised. The court ordered that Picton's obligations to the court be postponed until the court could consider the matter further but no judgment was ever delivered.

Picton stated in a letter to a friend:

I was desired to administer the laws of the island as they existed at the capitulation. Of these I knew nothing; but my knowledge of the language enabled me to learn them. A judge was appointed under me, with the same instructions, to administer Spanish law; and he was acquainted with the laws of Spain: to him therefore I was obliged to look; and, however contrary to my opinion of justice and humanity, which was founded upon our own admirable institution, I was compelled to sanction his proceedings. Had I been told to administer English law, I should have done so to the best of my ability; but I was instructed to administer justice according to a code of which I was totally ignorant; and the disturbed state of the colony left me little time for study. In the case for which I am now being tried, if I was guilty of anything culpable, it was ignorance; but the notary cited the law to me, and I then thought I had no alternative but to administer the Spanish laws as they were, instead of, as I have since learned, modelling them to the forms prescribed by our own legislature, and to the feelings of the British public. By the laws of England, which it appears ought to have been put in force instead of those of Spain, I think the girl Luise Calderon as an accessory before the fact, and Gonzales as the principal, would have been hanged for stealing in a dwelling-house above the value of forty shillings, while Pedro Ruiz would have lost his money; and I leave impartial minds to determine whether in this instance Spanish law was not more satisfactory and merciful to all parties.

Friends of Picton in the military and among slave owners subscribed towards his legal expenses. Picton contributed the same sum to a relief fund after a widespread fire in Port of Spain. He had meanwhile been promoted major-general, and in 1809 he had been governor of Flushing in the Netherlands during the Walcheren expedition.

== European military service ==
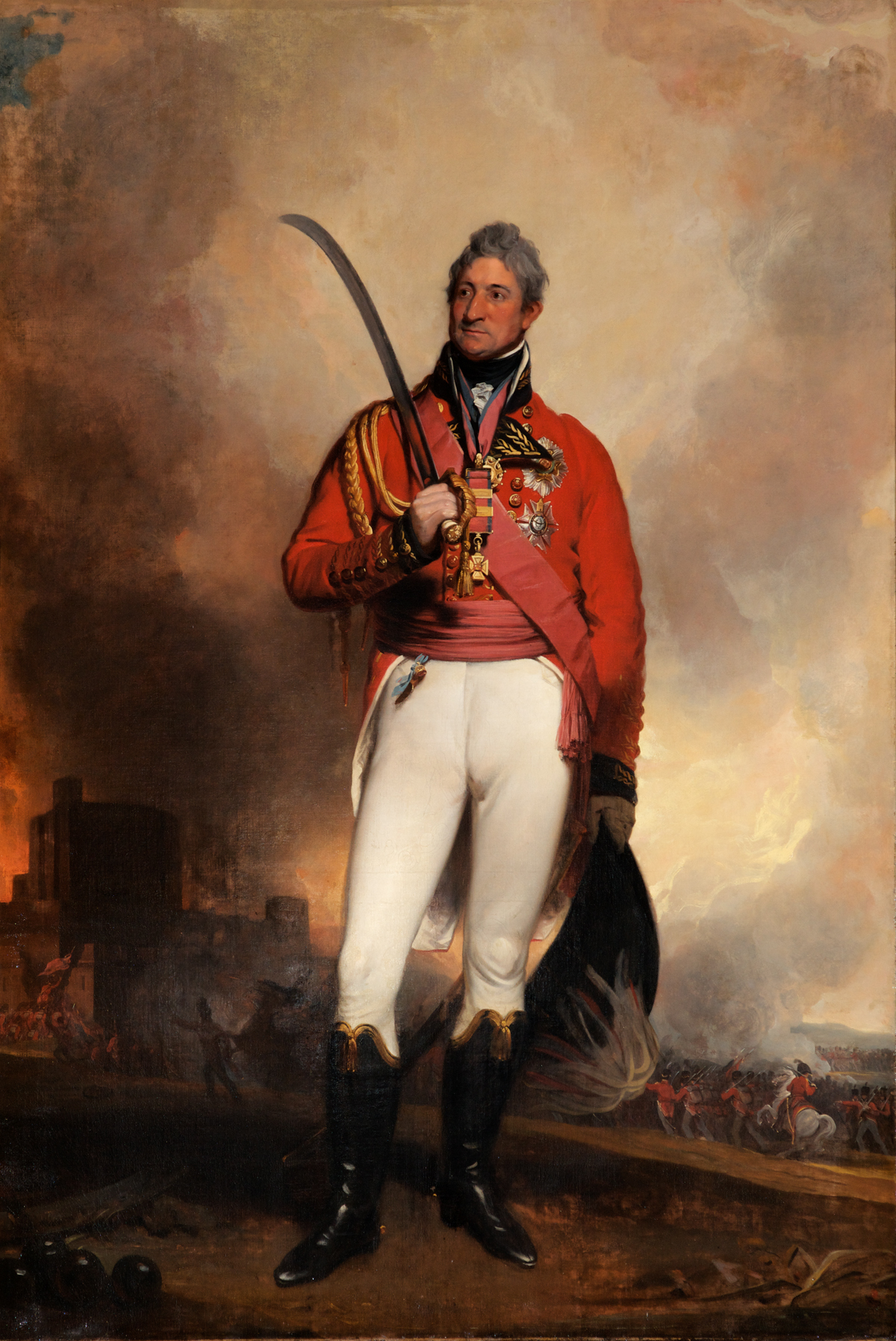
Picton painted by Martin Archer Shee

In 1810, at Wellington's request, Picton was appointed to command a division in Spain. Wellington recalled that he had been recommended by General Miranda, who considered him "extremely clever", but also did not trust him, because "he has so much vanity that if you sent him out to the Caraccas or the West India Islands, he would attempt to become the prince of them". Wellington commented when he met Picton,

I found him a rough foul-mouthed devil as ever lived, but he always behaved extremely well; no man could do better in different services I assigned to him, and I saw nothing to confirm what Miranda had said of his ambition.

For the remaining years of the Peninsular War, Picton was one of Wellington's principal subordinates. The commander-in-chief never reposed in him the confidence that he gave to Beresford, Hill and Robert Craufurd but in the resolute, thorough and punctual execution of a well-defined task Picton had no superior in the army. His debut, owing partly to his naturally stern and now embittered temper, and partly to the difficult position in which he was placed, was unfortunate. On the River Coa in July 1810 Craufurd's division became involved in an action, and Picton, his nearest neighbour, refused to support him, as Wellington's direct orders were to avoid an engagement. Shortly after this, however, at Busaco, Picton succeeded in driving French forces across a ravine in considerable disorder.

After the winter in the lines of Torres Vedras, he added to his reputation and to that of his division, the "Fighting" 3rd, at the Battle of Fuentes de Onoro. In September he was given the local rank of lieutenant-general, and in the same month the division won great glory by its rapid and orderly retirement under severe pressure from the French cavalry at the engagement at El Bodon. In October Picton was appointed to the colonelcy of the 77th Regiment of Foot.

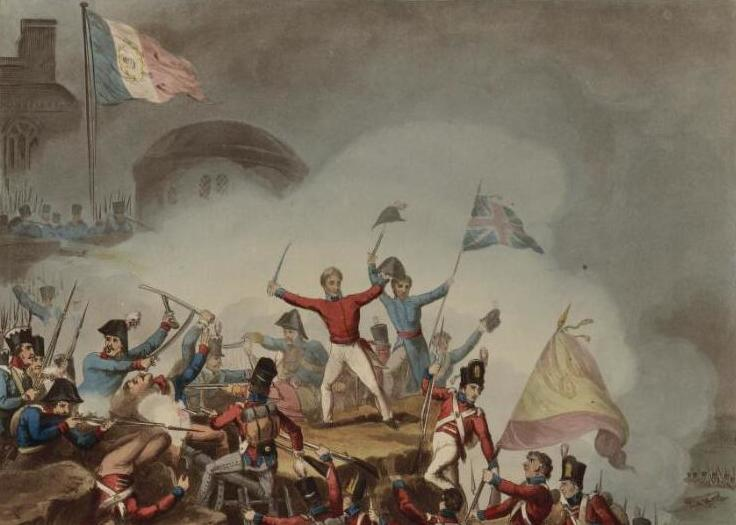
Picton storming the Castle of Badajoz, 31 March 1812

In the first operations of 1812 Picton and Craufurd, side by side, stormed the two breaches of Ciudad Rodrigo. Both Craufurd and Picton's second in command, Major-General Henry MacKinnon, were mortally wounded in the engagement. At Badajoz, a month later, the successful storming of the fortress was due to his daring self-reliance and penetration in converting the secondary attack on the castle, delivered by the 3rd Division, into a real one. He was himself wounded in this terrible engagement, but would not leave the ramparts, and the day after, having recently inherited a fortune, he gave every survivor of his command a guinea. His wound, and an attack of fever, compelled him to return to Britain to recoup his health, but he reappeared at the front in April 1813. While in Britain he was invested with the collar and badge of a Knight of the Order of the Bath by the Prince Regent George, and in June he was made a lieutenant-general in the army. At this time, Picton purchased the Iscoed estate in Carmarthenshire, and was returned triumphantly as Member of Parliament for Pembroke Boroughs at a by-election on 19 March 1813.

At the Battle of Vitoria, Picton led his division across a key bridge under heavy fire. According to Picton, the enemy responded by pummeling the 3rd with 40 to 50 cannon and a counter-attack on their right flank (which was still open because they had captured the bridge so quickly) causing the 3rd to lose 1,800 men (over one third of all Allied losses at the battle) as they held their ground. The conduct of the 3rd division under his leadership at Vittoria and in the engagements in the Pyrenees raised his reputation as a resolute and skilful fighting general to a still higher point. Early in 1814 he was offered, but after consulting Wellington declined, the command of the British forces operating on the side of Catalonia.

On the break-up of the division the officers presented Picton with a valuable service of plate, and on 24 June 1814 he received for the seventh time the thanks of the House of Commons for his great services. Somewhat to his disappointment he was not included amongst the generals who were raised to the peerage, but early in 1815 he was appointed Knight Grand Cross of the Order of the Bath (GCB).

== Death ==
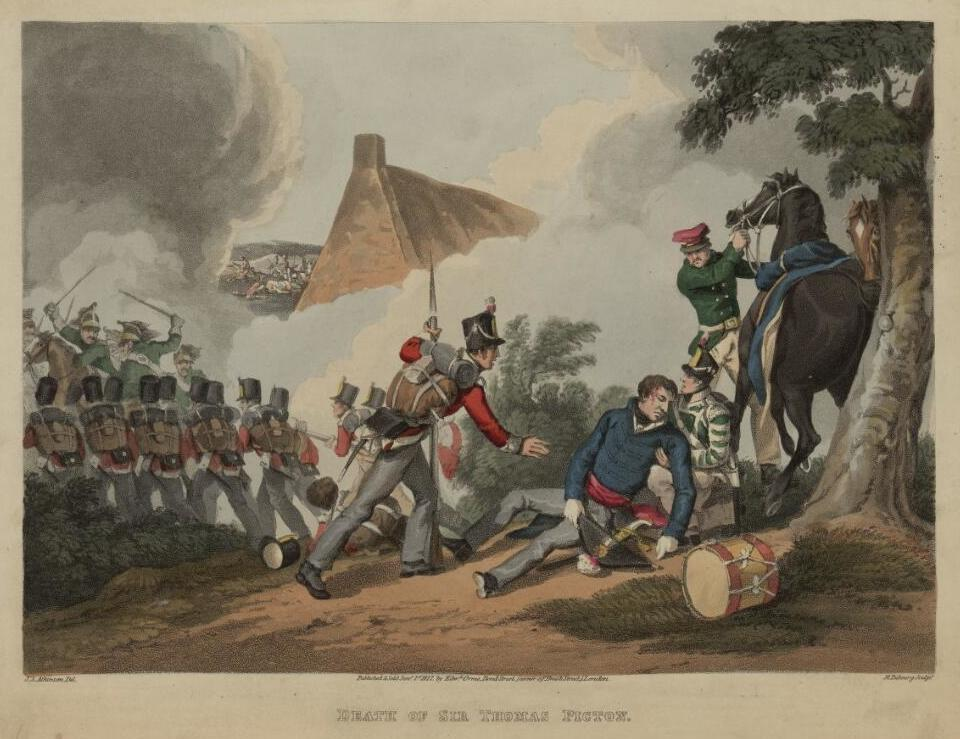
Death of Sir Thomas Picton

When Napoleon returned from Elba, Picton, at Wellington's request, accepted a high command in the Anglo-Dutch army, and was appointed commander of the 5th Infantry Division. Along with every other senior officer in the army, he was invited to the Duchess of Richmond's Ball that was held on 15 June.

On 18 June, at Waterloo, when Napoleon sent in the Comte d'Erlon's Corps to attack the Anglo-allied centre near La Haye Sainte at 13:30, Picton launched a bayonet charge on the advancing French column. While repulsing the attack with impetuous valour – his last words were "Charge! Charge! Hurrah! Hurrah!" – he was shot through the temple with a musket ball.

Announcing his death, Wellington wrote to the Minister of War, Lord Bathurst:

Your Lordship will observe, that such a desperate action could not be fought, and such advantages could not be gained, without great loss; and, I am sorry to add, that ours has been immense. In Lieutenant-General Sir Thomas Picton, His Majesty has sustained the loss of an Officer who has frequently distinguished himself in his service; and he fell, gloriously leading his division to a charge with bayonets, by which one of the most serious attacks made by the enemy of our position was defeated.

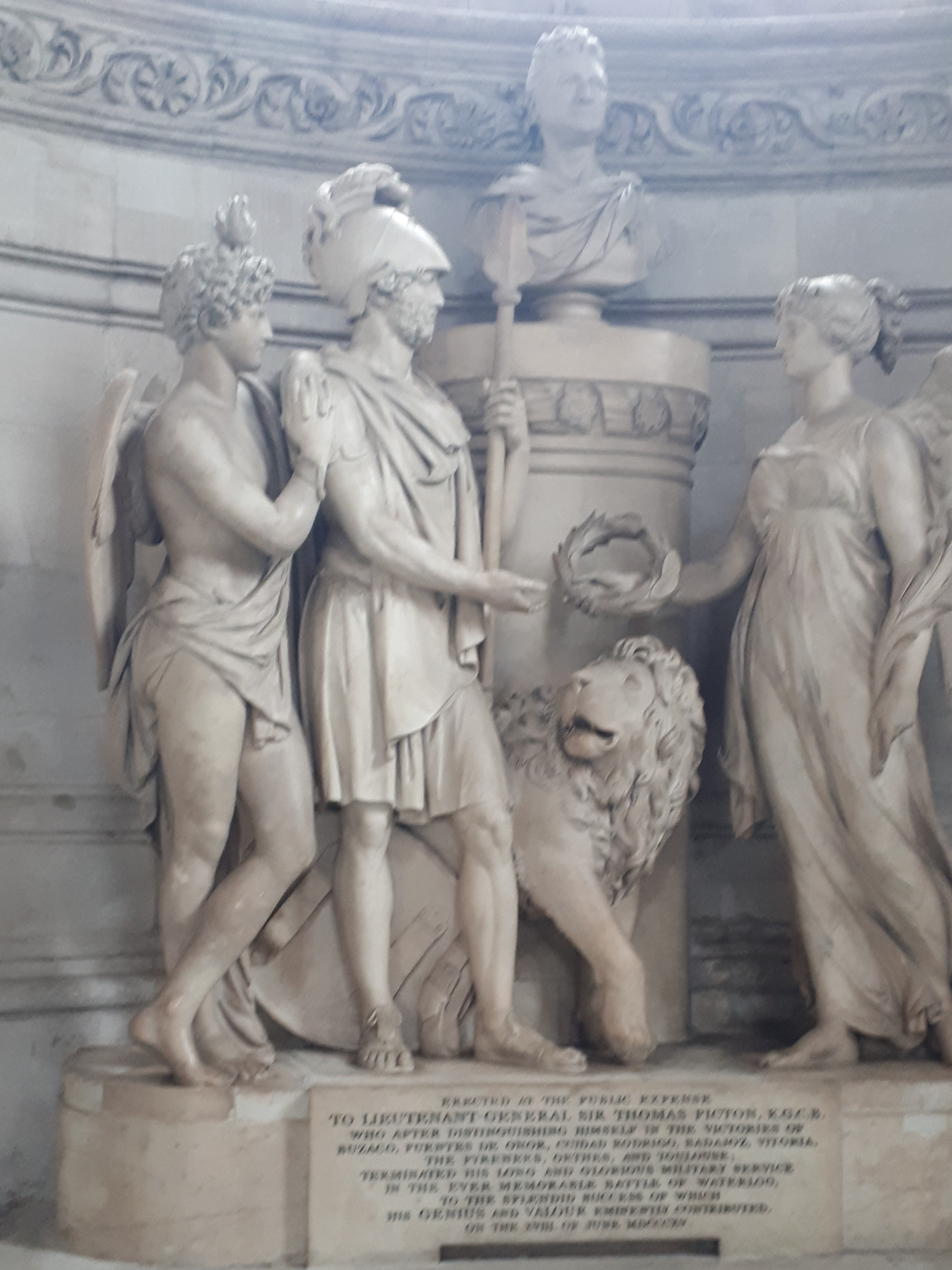
Sebastian Gahagan. Memorial to Thomas Picton at St. Paul's Cathedral (1816)

On subsequent examination, Picton's body was found to have suffered a serious musket ball wound to the hip at Quatre Bras on the 16th. Apart from his servant, he had told no one, nor had he consulted a surgeon, choosing instead to bandage the wound himself.

His body arrived in Deal in Kent on 25 June to a salute from the guns of the ships moored in The Downs. It reached Canterbury the same evening and was deposited in a room at the Fountain Inn where Picton had dined on his way to the Continent. At 6:00 am on 26 June, to the strains of the "Dead March" in Saul, the funeral procession accompanied by the 52nd Regiment of Foot with reversed arms moved off towards London where it arrived on 3 July.

== Burial and monuments ==
He was interred in the family vault at St George's, Hanover Square. A public monument was erected to his memory in St Paul's Cathedral, by order of Parliament, and in 1823 another Picton Monument was erected at Carmarthen by subscription, the king contributing a hundred guineas. On 8 June 1859, his body was re-interred in St Paul's Cathedral, lying close to the body of the Duke of Wellington.

He is memorialised in St Michael's Church, Rudbaxton in Pembrokeshire, the parish in which he grew up. There is also a monument on the battlefield of Waterloo.

== Namings in his honour ==
Places

- The town of Picton in Prince Edward County, Ontario, Canada
- The town of Picton, New Zealand.
- Picton, New South Wales, a town named by Picton's military colleague, Lachlan Macquarie
- Picton Junction, Western Australia was named by Waterloo veterans who settled the southwest of Western Australia
- Picton Island, at the east entrance of the Beagle Channel in Chile, South America; named by Robert Fitzroy and Phillip Parker King

Roads

- Picton Road, Abersychan, Wales
- Picton Road, Rhoose, Wales
- Picton Street, Griffithstown, Wales
- Picton Street, Brighton, England
- Picton Terrace, Blaenau Ffestiniog, Wales
- Picton Terrace, Carmarthen, Wales
- Picton Road, a highway in Australia
- Picton Street, Howick, Auckland, New Zealand
- Picton Avenue, Riccarton, Christchurch, New Zealand
- Picton Street, Montpelier, Bristol. There is also a double-bayed villa in the street named Picton Lodge.
- Picton Street, Port of Spain, Trinidad and Tobago

Public houses

- The General Picton Inn in Porthcawl
- The General Picton, 134 Cardiff Road, Aberaman, Aberdare
- The General Picton in Picton Place, Nantyffyllon, Maesteg. The sign bears an image of Sir Thomas. The area also contains a Picton Street named after him; he owned a large amount of land in the area.
- The Picton is a public house in Commercial Road, Newport. The sign depicts Sir Thomas in military uniform resting the blade of his sword upon his left shoulder.

Other

- Picton Barracks, Bulford Camp, Wiltshire – the headquarters of the British Army's 3rd Division since 1992
- Picton Barracks, Carmarthen, Wales
- HMS Sir Thomas Picton, a Royal Navy monitor launched in 1915
- The Rhymney Brewery in Rhymney, South Wales, produces a cask ale named General Picton
- The Picton, a boys' boarding house at Wellington College, Berkshire, a private school
- Picton House, a house at Haverfordwest Grammar School (closed 1978), Picton's old school in Haverfordwest, Pembrokeshire
- Sir Thomas Picton School (Ysgol Sir Thomas Picton), a mixed comprehensive school in Haverfordwest, Pembrokeshire, Wales – closed 2018.
- Picton Monument, Carmarthen, Wales
- Picton Arcade, Swansea. A covered city centre shopping area linking the Kingsway and Oxford Street.
- Picton House, Alameda Estate, Gibraltar.
- Fort Picton (St David's Tower), Laventille Hills, Port of Spain, Trinidad. This structure has been described as a Martello tower.

== In fiction ==
In the 1970 Soviet-Italian epic film, Waterloo, Picton was played by the English actor Jack Hawkins.

In episode one of the second series of the television programme Sharpe, Picton is portrayed in a top hat and frock coat, by an uncredited, nonspeaking actor. Picton is asked by Lord Wellington, who should replace Colonel Lawford, commander of the South Essex, and he appears briefly once more.

Picton's trial is depicted in episode three of the third series of the 2011 television series Garrow's Law; Picton is played by Patrick Baladi.

== Likenesses ==
- Oil portrait (c1812) of Sir Thomas Picton by Sir Martin Archer Shee, in the National Portrait Gallery.
- Oil portrait (c1815) by Sir William Beechey, at Apsley House, London.
- Bust (1816) by Sebastian Gahagan, in St Paul's Cathedral.
- Lithograph by an anonymous artist of Sir Thomas Picton on horseback (1815), in the National Portrait Gallery.
- Serravezza marble statue (1916) of Sir Thomas Picton by Thomas Mewburn Crook in Cardiff City Hall, one of a series entitled "Heroes of Wales".

In June 2020, in the wake of the George Floyd protests and the toppling of the statue of Edward Colston in Bristol, the Lord Mayor of Cardiff, Dan De'Ath, and the leader of Cardiff Council, Huw Thomas, supported calls to remove the City Hall statue on account of Picton's links to slavery. In July, the Council voted to remove the statue.

- In November 2021 National Museum Cardiff removed from display a portrait of Picton by Shree which had been in its collection since 1907, due to his record in Trinidad. In August 2022, the portrait, which had previously formed part of the "Faces of Wales" gallery, was put back on display in an exhibition called "Reframing Picton" and was surrounded by descriptions of his brutal treatment of the people of Trinidad.

== Bibliography ==
- A Near Observer (1815). The Battle of Waterloo, Containing The Series of Accounts Published by Authority, British and Foreign Sources &c.
- Barbero, Alessandro (2005). The Battle: A New History of Waterloo. New York: Walker & Co. p. 14. ISBN 9780802714534.
- Epstein, James (2007). "Politics of Colonial Sensation: The Trial of Thomas Picton and the Cause of Louisa Calderon". AHR Forum. American Historical Review. 112 (3): 712–741. doi:10.1086/ahr.112.3.712. ISSN 1937-5239. JSTOR 40006668.
- Havard, Robert (1996). Wellington's Welsh General: A Life of Sir Thomas Picton. London: Aurum. ISBN 1854104020.
- Havard, Robert (2004). "Picton, Sir Thomas (1758–1815)". Oxford Dictionary of National Biography (online ed.). Oxford University Press. doi:10.1093/ref:odnb/22219. (Subscription, Wikipedia Library access or UK public library membership required.)
- Michelena, Carmen L. (2010). Luces revolucionarias: De la rebelión de Madrid (1795) a la rebelión de La Guaira (1797). Caracas: CELARG.
- Myatt, Frederick (1980). Peninsular General: Sir Thomas Picton, 1758–1815. Newton Abbott: David & Charles. ISBN 0715379232.
- Naipaul, V. S. (1969). The Loss of El Dorado: A History. London: André Deutsch.
- Robinson, Heaton Bowstead (1836). Memoirs of Lieutenant-General Sir T. Picton, including his correspondence, etc (2nd ed.). London.
- Swann, B. P. (1984). "Sir Thomas Picton: some unpublished facts about his career and relations". Dyfed Family History Journal/Cymdeithas Hanes Teuluoedd Dyfed. 1: 172–175.

== Political summary ==
Political offices
Preceded by Sir Ralph Abercromby	Governor of Trinidad; 1797–1802	Succeeded by Commission (William Fullarton, Samuel Hood, Thomas Picton)
Preceded by Louis Cesar Gabriel Berthier	Governor of Tobago; 1803	Succeeded by William Johnstone
Military offices
Preceded by Sir Charles Hastings, Bt.	Colonel of the 77th (East Middlesex) Regiment of Foot; 1811–1815	Succeeded by George Cooke
Parliament of Great Britain
Preceded by John Owen	Member of Parliament for Pembroke Boroughs; 1813–1815	Succeeded by John Jones
