= Recessional (novel) =

1994 novel by James A. Michener

- First edition
- Author: James A. Michener
- Language: English
- Genre: Fiction
- Publisher: Random House
- Publication date: 1994
- Publication place: United States
- Media type: print
- Pages: 484pp.
- ISBN: 0-679-43612-X

Recessional (1994), the final novel by American author James A. Michener, centers on life in a fictional retirement home and hospice known as The Palms.

Disgraced obstetrician Andy Zorn's life changes when he is hired by John Taggart, the head of a retirement home chain, to run his financially unstable Florida operation called The Palms. Andy must agree to sign on as a business manager only, and is in no way authorized to provide medical advice or treatment to the residents of the geriatric care facility. This restriction eats away at him as difficult situations develop and call out to his medical expertise and sense of professional obligation. As Andy struggles to keep The Palms, his reputation, and hope afloat, he faces politics and morality, romance and bitterness, and a litigious scandal from his own past that threatens to ignite controversy wherever he goes.

Though not as epic in scope as some of Michener's other works, Recessional follows a familiar narrative rhythm that Michener largely maintained throughout his career. Michener's training at Swarthmore College in Pennsylvania was in history and sociology so he was well qualified to write on this subject especially as he was 87 when the book was published. Although this was his final novel, it was not his last book; his last book was A Century of Sonnets, a collection of his poetry published in 1997, the year he died, on the occasion of his 90th birthday. The novel educates as it tells a series of interconnected vignettes that collectively paint a larger picture of life in the retirement industry, both from a business point of view, and from that of the residents themselves as they seek meaning and companionship in the twilight of their lives.

Michener lived at Allegro retirement center in St. Petersburg, FL, during the writing and researching of the book; Allegro was then attached to Eckerd College where Michener used the school and library facilities for additional data gathering. Michener endowed a writing school at Eckerd College which was founded by Eckerd Drug and is the site of the 2011 annual meeting of the James A. Michener Society.
