= A Way in the World =

1994 book by V. S. Naipaul

- First edition cover
- Author: V. S. Naipaul
- Language: English
- Publisher: Alfred A. Knopf
- Publication date: 1994
- Media type: Print (hardcover and paperback)
- Pages: 380
- ISBN: 0394564782
- OCLC: 29519580

A Way in the World is a 1994 book by Nobel laureate V. S. Naipaul. Although it was marketed as a novel in America, A Way in the World, which consists of linked narratives, is arguably something different.

== Novel or sequence? ==
Despite his achievements as a novelist, in later life Naipaul described the novel as an outmoded form. A Way in the World was published in the United Kingdom with the sub-title "sequence", and this is reflected in British reviews. In the United States, A Way in the World was published as a novel, apparently at the request of the American publisher.

== Relationship to The Loss of El Dorado ==
A Way in the World is more fictional than Naipaul's earlier historical work The Loss of El Dorado (1969), which deals with some of the same material, for example the lives of Sir Walter Raleigh and Francisco de Miranda. Naipaul also includes autobiographical material, partly fictionalised, which was not in the earlier book.

== Recognition ==
The book was shortlisted for the International Dublin Literary Award.
