= Dinosaur Roar! =

- Author: Paul and Henrietta Stickland
- Illustrator: Paul Stickland
- Language: English
- Published: 1994, Dutton Juvenile
- Publication place: United Kingdom
- Media type: Print
- Pages: 12 pages
- ISBN: 0525458344

Dinosaur Roar! is a 1994 children's book that was written and illustrated by Paul and Henrietta Stickland. The book was first published on January 1, 1994, through Dutton Juvenile and has received multiple reprintings since then. Several spin-off works such as coloring books have been released and the book has sold over 5 million copies worldwide and has been translated into more than 30 languages. Rights to the book were purchased by Nurture Rights Kids Co. in 2013, with the intent to launch a wider franchise surrounding the work.

A 20th anniversary edition was published in April 2014, and Immediate Media is developing a mobile app of the book to coincide with the release.

== Synopsis ==
The book features pictures of various different types of dinosaurs that are paired with rhyming text that discusses various different features and differences such as "weak vs strong" and "long vs short".

== Reception ==
Kirkus Reviews praised the work upon its initial release for its "crafty details". The work has also received positive reviews from the Horn Book Guide, School Library Journal, and Booklist, with Booklist remarking that the work was "a good group read-aloud, even for the very young." In 2013 School Library Journal also listed the work as one of their "Must-have Board Books for Early Childhood Collections".

== Development, Publication and Reception ==
=== Translations ===
Dinosaur Roar! was translated into Scottish Gaelic and published in 2017 under the name Dìneasair Ràn!
