= Antoine Wilson =

Canadian-American writer

- Born: 1971 (age 54–55); Montreal, Quebec, Canada
- Occupation: Writer
- Writing career
- Period: 2000s–present
- Notable work: Panorama City
- Website: antoinewilson.com

Antoine Wilson (born 1971) is a Canadian-American novelist and short story writer. He was born in Montreal, Quebec, and later lived in Southern California, Central California, and Saudi Arabia. He attended UCLA and Iowa Writers' Workshop. He currently lives in Los Angeles, where he is a contributing editor of the Brooklyn-based literary magazine A Public Space.

== Career ==
His debut novel The Interloper, published by Other Press in 2007, grapples with themes of family, crime, and revenge through the lens of an unreliable narrator. Wilson has said that the novel was partly inspired by the murder of his older brother when Wilson was seven years old. The Interloper was a finalist for the Foreword Book of the Year and was named a Book of the Decade by The L Magazine.

His second novel, Panorama City, was published by Houghton Mifflin Harcourt in 2012. It spent seven weeks on the Los Angeles Times Bestseller list and was widely reviewed. In The New York Times Book Review, Adam Ross noted a shift in Wilson's focus: "If The Interloper was about lighting the way to hell, to paraphrase Milton, here the author's gaze is directed heavenward, toward sanity and the good in all of us. Panorama City is about our struggle to remain open to one another in a world that categorizes and closes us off at every turn."

In Germany, Panorama City was released as Ein Mann von Welt.

Wilson's third novel, Mouth to Mouth, was published by Avid Reader (Simon & Schuster) in 2022. It follows the story of a man who saves the life of a stranger and the fateful entanglements that follow. President Barack Obama included the book on his 2022 Summer Reading List. It was also chosen as one of the best books of 2022 by TIME and NPR.

Wilson's short fiction has appeared in A Public Space, The Paris Review, Storyquarterly, Quarterly West, and the Los Angeles Times, as well as Best New American Voices 2001. His stories have received Special Mention in The Pushcart Prize XXX and XXXVII.

In 2022, Wilson appeared on Storybound reading an excerpt from Mouth to Mouth.

== Awards ==
In 2001, he was awarded the Carol Houck Smith Fiction Fellowship at the University of Wisconsin Institute for Creative Writing.

In 2005, he was a finalist for the National Magazine Award in Fiction.

Panorama City was named a Best Book of 2012 by The San Francisco Chronicle and an editors' choice by The New York Times Book Review. Panorama City was a finalist for the Southern California Independent Booksellers Association Award in 2013. In 2017, Panorama City won the inaugural San Fernando Valley Award for Fiction from the Friends of the Library at California State University, Northridge.

Mouth to Mouth was a finalist for the 2022 California Independent Booksellers Alliance Golden Poppy Award and was longlisted for the 2022 Giller Prize.
