= Monster Man (novel) =

Book by Glyn Parry

Monster Man is a psychological thriller about the abduction of two Australian girls. The book is by the Australian author Glyn Parry.

== Overview ==
The story is set in Western Australia. Melanie Spence was just another sixteen-year-old until one sunny afternoon she was kidnapped. Suddenly her everyday problems—an oversexed boyfriend, an irritating mother, a dad who left home—paled in comparison to the sick fantasyland her kidnapper called reality.

Curtis Lowe was about forty, trapped in his own demented netherworld of domineering monsters, dead sisters, and an obsessive desire for a family. Melanie and a little four-year-old girl were his prisoners on a terrifying odyssey of danger and destruction. There was no way he would let them go...not alive, anyway.

Though bound and gagged, Melanie refused to give up hope. She still had her brains, so why be a victim when she could be a survivor?...

== Plot ==
Curtis abducts Melanie and a four-year-old girl to fulfill his desire for a family.

Curtis takes these two girl on a trip to his old school where he was bullied and burns down the school. He then hides with them down at a beach. When has to kill a man and his dog to cover their tracks, Melanie and the girl runs away.

Whilst everyone thinks that Curtis is dead, he comes back for revenge and tries to kill Melanie whilst she is in hospital recovering from the injuries sustained whilst being a prisoner of him.
