= Jim Knipfel =

American journalist (1965–2026)

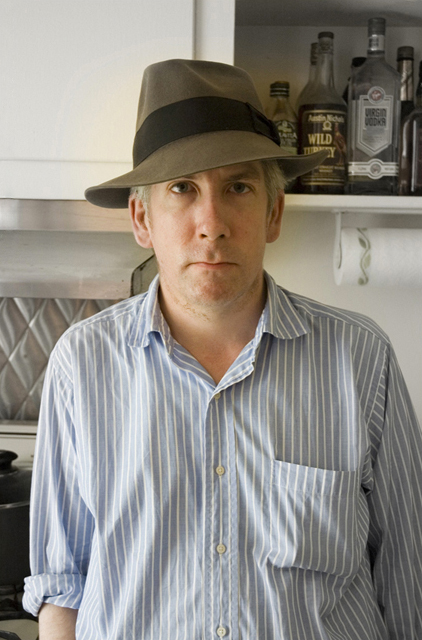
- Knipfel in his Brooklyn, New York apartment in 2006
- Born: June 2, 1965; Grand Forks, North Dakota, U.S.
- Died: October 7, 2026 (aged 61); Green Bay, Wisconsin, U.S.
- Occupations: Novelist, journalist
- Writing career
- Notable works: Memoir Slackjaw (1999); Fiction The Buzzing (2003)
- Website: missioncreep.com/slackjaw

James Knipfel (pronounced Kah-nipfel; June 2, 1965 – October 7, 2026) was an American journalist, autobiographer, and novelist.

Born in North Dakota and raised in Wisconsin, Knipfel was the author of three memoirs, Slackjaw, Quitting the Nairobi Trio, and Ruining It for Everybody; as well as two novels, The Buzzing, and Noogie's Time to Shine. He wrote news stories, film and music reviews, the crime blotter, and feature articles until June 13, 2006, for the weekly alternative newspaper New York Press.

Knipfel also wrote the long-running "Slackjaw" column for the Press. The first edition of "Slackjaw" appeared on October 25, 1987, in the Welcomat, a Philadelphia weekly (later renamed the Philadelphia Weekly), where he also reviewed restaurants and art exhibits.

== Background and early career ==
Knipfel was born on June 2, 1965, in Grand Forks, North Dakota, on the U.S. Air Force base where his father was then stationed. Before he was a year old, the Knipfel family moved to Green Bay, Wisconsin, where his father continued to work for the U.S. Air Force for many years and his mother worked in a variety of jobs. In his teens, he was diagnosed with a rare genetic disease called retinitis pigmentosa, which would progressively render him blind in later years. His first memoir, Slackjaw, chronicles the deterioration of his eyesight.

In his teens, while the family was living in Green Bay, he suffered from bouts of severe depression. Between the ages of 14 and 22, Knipfel tried to kill himself twelve times. After his final suicide attempt he was committed to a locked-door psychiatric ward in Minneapolis, Minnesota, where he spent six months. He recounted his time there in his second memoir. In a Salon.com interview, he expressed bafflement at his multiple attempts at suicide: "I can't explain why I [attempted suicide] so many times, and how I did such a horrible job of it." In a 2003 interview with Leonard Lopate he said he'd found happiness and was too interested in life to attempt suicide again.

He briefly studied physics at the University of Chicago, and then transferred to the University of Wisconsin, Madison, where he majored in philosophy. When Knipfel and a friend nicknamed Grinch formed a campus political party called the Nihilist Workers Party they put together a flier promoting "telephone terrorism" that was published in the University of Wisconsin, Madison's student newspaper The Daily Cardinal without their permission. The prank earned a brief mention in Time magazine in 1987.

Knipfel wrote that he planned, attempted, and committed many petty crimes in his youth. He wrote of a failed attempt to steal the corpse of the notorious American killer and graverobber Ed Gein from the graveyard at the Mendota Mental Health Institute in Madison. However, Gein was buried in Plainfield, Wisconsin, some 80 miles north of the hospital where he died.

In 1990, Knipfel moved to Brooklyn, New York, with his then-wife Laura. He continued to write his weekly "Slackjaw" column for Philadelphia's Welcomat and tried to get the editor of the alternative weekly New York Press, John Strausbaugh, interested in publishing "Slackjaw", but the Press did not want to share the column with the Welcomat. Knipfel kept "Slackjaw" at the Welcomat out of loyalty to his editor Derek Davis, but he began occasionally contributing articles and music reviews to New York Press.

In 1993, after Davis was pushed out by Welcomat management, Knipfel moved Slackjaw to the New York Press. Shortly thereafter Knipfel became a receptionist at the paper's offices, and later a full-time columnist and staff writer.

== Slackjaw: a memoir ==
At first Knipfel was dead set against writing a memoir, and was "content to publish in small publications" and quite "happy with the sheer disposability of newspaper writing", however, when Penguin Putnam editor David Groff offered him a book deal in 1997, after a decade of writing his column for New York Press, he accepted, rationalizing "that maybe there wasn't anything all that wrong with leaving something a little more solid behind". The first draft of Slackjaw was completed in two weeks, and at 500 pages long it was largely a collection of several dozen independent stories drawn from his columns. Although Knipfel could not discern a greater theme in the first draft, his editor pointed out that the memoir generally chronicled his journey towards blindness. With this theme in mind, Knipfel rewrote several drafts of Slackjaw, "looking at the stories in a different way and trying to find something that flows and has a rhythm", which finally produced a leaner memoir of which 60% of the content was fresh.

To promote Slackjaw, Knipfel went on a grueling 10-city tour, which was physically taxing due to his progressive vision loss. At readings, he read from computer printouts with large letters, using a magnifying glass and a bright, direct light from a strong lamp.

Slackjaw was well received by critics and was a popular success. A much-publicized blurb was provided by the reclusive novelist Thomas Pynchon, who received the galley proofs of this and subsequent works, describing Slackjaw as "an extraordinary emotional ride, through the lives and times of reader and writer alike, maniacally aglow with a born storyteller's gifts of observation". Roger K. Miller in The Chicago Sun-Times described Slackjaw as "a volume to set opposite all those chirpy, slurpy books on maximizing your potential, enhancing your self-esteem and accessing your inner powers" and Ellen Clegg in The Boston Globe summed it up succinctly as "a disease book with an attitude", elaborating that "Knipfel seems content to let the inner felon emerge."

== Subsequent memoirs ==
After Slackjaw, Knipfel wrote two additional memoirs, Quitting the Nairobi Trio (2000) and Ruining It for Everybody (2004). In contrast to his first book tour, Knipfel remained in New York City to promote Quitting the Nairobi Trio, a chronicle of the six months he spent in a locked psychiatric ward in Minneapolis following his final suicide attempt. Critics were largely impressed with Knipfel's second memoir, although there was one recurrent caveat: the chapters containing descriptions of Knipfel's personal hallucinations while at the ward did not work. Ellen Clegg in The Boston Globe believed that while personal hallucinations are "important to the beholder [they] don't always translate in the wider world" and Daphne Merkin in The New York Times expressed how her interest flagged "only when [Knipfel] went into lengthy descriptions of his wearyingly vivid dreams". In the introduction to Quitting the Nairobi Trio, Knipfel explained that although he had hallucinations in the past, "they've always faded in time", and yet the hallucinatory events of those first few days, as he settled into the psychiatric ward, were easier for him to recall than very recent events, because these hallucinations mysteriously have "a tenacity and clarity unattributable to any simple unconscious reaction in the brain's biochemistry".

A few years after his third memoir was published, Knipfel stated in a 2007 interview with Leonard Lopate that he was finished writing memoirs, and instead would concentrate on fiction. His sentiment on his memoirs was: "I had three of them out before I was forty, and I think that's just asinine."

== Fiction ==
Knipfel was fond of pulp fiction and his fiction has been categorized as such.

Several other attempts at fiction by Knipfel were rejected before his novel The Buzzing clicked with a publisher and thus his first novel was released by Vintage Books in 2003. The Buzzing is about Roscoe Baragon, an aging journalist reduced to working the kook beat, who investigates an elaborate cover-up; the storyline was noted to contain similarities to Knipfel's former job at New York Press and Knipfel admitted that "Roscoe, to put it simply, represents what I would like to be." Critical reception was mixed. According to Emily White in The New York Times, the novel entertains, however, "there are moments when the narrative stumbles or the dialogue slows".

Knipfel's second novel was Noogie's Time to Shine. His third novel Unplugging Philco was released in April 2009 by Simon & Schuster In 2010 Simon & Schuster published his short story collection These Children Who Come at You With Knives and Other Fairy Tales. They then published his novel The Blow-Off in 2011.

== Later journalism ==
In June 2006, Knipfel was fired by the New York Press, concluding thirteen years with the paper. His "Slackjaw" column continued at Electron Press, yet published exclusively online with a much diminished readership. Since Electron Press began publishing "Slackjaw" in October 2006, some of Knipfel's most notable columns have been, "History Lesson, Pt. 986", introducing Slackjaw's history; and "You Must Be Very Proud", about the inauguration of New York's first legally blind and first black governor, David Paterson. In an April 2008 column, "The Statistics of Contempt", Knipfel harangued mothers of Park Slope, Brooklyn for their inconsiderate use of their baby strollers on the local sidewalks, provoking a strong reaction from readers according to Knipfel: "I can't remember anything like this - at least not since the early days". The Brooklyn blog Brownstoner wrote that Knipfel's "new rant about Park Slope stroller culture ... sets the bar high for future diatribes on the subject".

From 2023 on, Knipfel contributed columns and cultural criticism to Truthdig. In 2025, he won first place in the online current-events columnist category at the Los Angeles Press Club's Southern California Journalism Awards for his work for the publication.

== Themes ==
Knipfel often spotlighted death in his writing and had written columns complaining that obituaries do not do justice to notable people. He complained about excessive media coverage of Heath Ledger's death, wrote about Charlton Heston's obituary, and, for a number of years, wrote an annual column on notable passings.

Knipfel's childhood in Green Bay, Wisconsin, was the subject of many of his essays, as well as his memoirs. He often recalled pleasant or defining moments from his youth, usually describing the state of his vision loss in those years.

== Death ==
Knipfel died from bile duct cancer at his home in Green Bay, Wisconsin, on October 7, 2026, at the age of 61.

== Selected bibliography ==
Memoirs

- Jim Knipfel (1999). Slackjaw. New York: Jeremy P. Tarcher/Putnam.
- Jim Knipfel (2000). Quitting the Nairobi Trio. New York: Jeremy P. Tarcher/Putnam.
- Jim Knipfel (2004). Ruining It for Everybody. New York: Jeremy P. Tarcher/Penguin.

Fiction

- Jim Knipfel (2003). The Buzzing: A Novel. New York: Vintage Books.
- Jim Knipfel (2007). Noogie's Time to Shine: A Novel. New York: Virgin Books.
- Jim Knipfel (2009). Unplugging Philco. Simon & Schuster. ISBN 9781416592846.
- Jim Knipfel (2010). These Children Who Come at You with Knives, and Other Fairy Tales. Simon & Schuster.

Short stories and essays

- Jim Knipfel (1998). "Human, All too (Almost) Human". In The Unbearables (Literary group) (ed.). Crimes of the Beats. Brooklyn, N.Y.: Autonomedia. pp. 69–72. ISBN 978-1-57027-069-7.
- Jim Knipfel (2001). "Working The Suit". In Danny Hellman (ed.). Legal Action Comics (V. 1 ed.). New York: Dirty Danny Legal Defense Fund. pp. 70–75. ISBN 978-0-9709363-0-1.
- Knipfel, Jim (November 2001). "Reading Louis-Ferdinand Céline". CONTEXT: A Forum for Literary Arts and Culture (8). The Center for Book Culture. Archived from the original on 2008-10-06.
- Helen Keller (2002). "Introduction by Jim Knipfel". The Story of My Life (100th Anniversary ed.). New York: Signet Classics. p. ix–xvii. ISBN 0-451-52825-5.
- Jim Knipfel (2007). "Subterranean Vaudeville". In Marshall Berman and Brian Berger (ed.). New York Calling: From Blackout to Bloomberg. London: Reaktion. pp. 42–52. ISBN 978-1-86189-338-3.
- Jim Knipfel (November 2008). "To Be Perfectly Honest" (PDF). New Haven Review (3). New Haven, Connecticut: 6–14. Archived from the original (PDF) on 2008-12-19.
