= 2001 Nobel Prize in Literature =

- Vidiadhar Surajprasad Naipaul
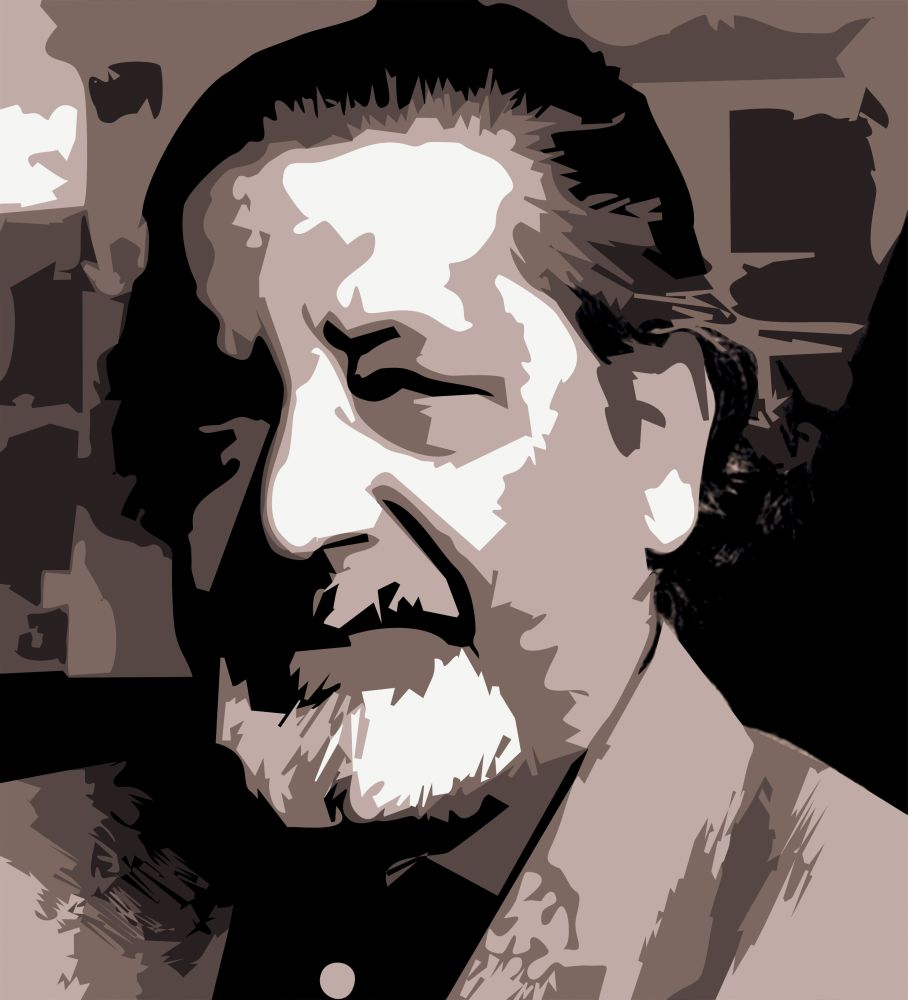
- "for having united perceptive narrative and incorruptible scrutiny in works that compel us to see the presence of suppressed histories."
- Date: 11 October 2001 (announcement); 10 December 2001 (ceremony)
- Location: Stockholm, Sweden
- Presented by: Swedish Academy
- First award: 1901
- Website: Official website

The 2001 Nobel Prize in Literature was awarded to the Trinidadian-born British writer Vidiadhar Surajprasad Naipaul (1932–2018), commonly known as V. S. Naipaul, "for having united perceptive narrative and incorruptible scrutiny in works that compel us to see the presence of suppressed histories." The Committee added: "Naipaul is a modern philosopher carrying on the tradition that started originally with Lettres persanes and Candide. In a vigilant style, which has been deservedly admired, he transforms rage into precision and allows events to speak with their own inherent irony." The Committee also noted Naipaul's affinity with the novelist Joseph Conrad:

Naipaul is Conrad's heir as the annalist of the destinies of empires in the moral sense: what they do to human beings. His authority as a narrator is grounded in the memory of what others have forgotten, the history of the vanquished.

== Laureate ==
In the heart of many V.S. Naipaul's works, colonialism and post-colonial society are the main settings, and the key themes are alienation and identity in a heterogeneous society. When A House for Mr Biswas was released in 1961, it was an enormous hit and Naipaul's big break on the world stage. His other well-known literary prose include A Flag on the Island (1967), The Mimic Men (1967), In a Free State (1971), Guerrillas (1974).

== Deliberations ==
V. S. Naipaul had been considered by the Nobel committee for many years. He was nominated in 1973 by committee member Artur Lundkvist, and according to another member, Anders Österling, Naipaul was a contender for the prize the following year. On awarding Naipaul the prize, the Swedish Academy singled out his book The Enigma of Arrival (1987) for particular praise, calling it "an unrelenting image of the placid collapse of the old colonial ruling culture and the decline of European neighbourhoods". Other contenders tipped to be in the running for the 2001 Nobel Prize in Literature included Israel's Amos Oz, South Africa's J. M. Coetzee (awarded in 2003), Canada's Margaret Atwood and America's Philip Roth.

== Reactions ==
The choice of V.S. Naipaul caused mixed reactions. In the Swedish newspaper Svenska Dagbladet professor Sture Linnér praised Naipaul's writing: "He is one of the greatest, not just in our generation but on the whole in modern literature." In the same newspaper, critic Mats Gellerfelt heavily criticised the Swedish Academy's decision to award Naipaul. Gellerfelt argued that Naipaul had his best time as a writer long behind him, a "postcolonial literature's favourite grandad", and pointed out three superior candidates for the prize: "In the art of writing novels there are today giants such as Antonio Lobo Antunes, Mario Vargas Llosa and Carlos Fuentes, perhaps the three most prominent novelists alive and still remarkably active and productive, right in the middle of a creativity booming with vigour." (Vargas Llosa subsequently won the Nobel Prize in 2010.) British author Martin Amis praised the Swedish Academy's choice of Naipaul, "His level of perception is of the highest, and his prose has become the perfect instrument for realising those perceptions on the page," Amis said, adding that Naipaul's travel writing "is perhaps the most important body of work of its kind in the second half of the century".

== Nobel lecture ==
V. S. Naipaul delivered his Nobel Lecture entitled Two Worlds at the Swedish Academy in Stockholm on 7 December 2001.

== Award ceremony ==
At the award ceremony in Stockholm on 10 December 2001, Horace Engdahl, permanent secretary of the Swedish Academy, said:

Naipaul has been praised for writing the best English in the market, and that may well be, but his view of style is reminiscent of Stendahl’s [sic], who believed a writer has failed if the reader remembers the words he has written: what should remain are his ideas. Naipaul is no worshipper of fantasy or utopia, no creator of alternative worlds. Dickens’ ability to describe London with the open gaze and simplicity of a child is his declared ideal. He continues a critical direction in literature that distances itself from myth and expressive hyperbole. His text is permanently unrelenting, like a chill wind that will not stop blowing. (...)

Decay and disappearance are a fundamental theme in Naipaul’s writings – but without grief, rather as something that makes existence bearable. The English landscape that he discovers in The Enigma of Arrival is the ruin of an age of greatness, and at last he feels at home! He says that even as a child, he has pondered that he was born into a world past its climax. Yet his books are not negative. His phrasing embodies an absence of resignation that keeps melancholy at bay and shares with the reader the pure joy of intelligence.
