= Robert Micklewright =

English artist

Robert Flavell Micklewright RWS (1923–2013) was a British artist, illustrator and designer. He worked as a freelancer and designed dust jackets for books by C. P. Snow and V. S. Naipaul, and posters for London Transport. According to The Guardian, his work was "always of a high standard".

Micklewright was born in West Bromwich, Staffordshire, the son of an illustrator, G. P. Micklewright, and Olive, née Flavell. He trained at the Croydon School of Art in the late 1930s. In World War II, he served in the Rifle Brigade, seeing action in North Africa, Italy, and Greece. His company commander was the glass engraver Laurence Whistler.

After the war, Micklewright trained at Wimbledon School of Art from 1947 to 1949 and the Slade School of Fine Art from 1949 to 1952. The Slade's focus was on fine art and, according to Micklewright, "wasn't a lot of use to ordinary mortals like myself".

Micklewright worked freelance and designed dust jackets for book publishers, Royal Mail stamp books, illustrations for the Radio Times, posters for London Transport, and paintings for companies including Shell and Gulf Oil. He created at least four posters for London Transport from 1968 to 1977, including Epping Forest in 1968, Kenwood House in 1975, and Marble Hill House in 1977. His 1970 London Transport poster for Ham House is in the permanent collection of the Victoria & Albert Museum, London.

Micklewright designed book dust jackets for various authors, including C. P. Snow, David Caute, Paul Hyde Bonner, Hubert Bagster, Malcolm Saville, and V. S. Naipaul. He designed the cover art for Naipaul's first novel, The Mystic Masseur, in 1957, and for his second, The Suffrage of Elvira , in 1958, both for André Deutsch.

Micklewright married while a student at the Slade and lived in the hamlet of Mogador, Surrey. He died in 2013.

== Gallery ==
The Mystic Masseur by V. S. Naipaul, cover illustration by Robert Micklewright

The Suffrage of Elvira by V. S. Naipaul, cover illustration by Robert Micklewright
