= One out of Many (story) =

Short story by V. S. Naipaul

"One out of Many" is a short story within an unconventionally formatted novel entitled In a Free State, written by V. S. Naipaul and originally published by André Deutsch in 1971. The protagonist, Santosh, is forced to give up his familiar life inside the stratified castes of India to move with his employer, now an Indian ambassador, to Washington, D.C., during the civil rights protests and commensurate "hippie era". Themes developed in the story reflect Santosh's abrupt displacement from a comfortable, life-long acclimation in India, to an alien environment in the United States, where his beliefs, perceptions, and sense of belonging are upended.

== About the author ==
V. S. Naipaul was a Trinidadian and Tobagonian British. He wrote works of fiction and nonfiction in English. He is known for his comedic early novels set in Trinidad, his bleaker novels of alienation in the wider world, and his vigilant chronicles of life and travels. He wrote in prose that was widely admired.

He published more than thirty books over fifty years. Naipaul won the Booker Prize in 1971 for his novel In a Free State. In 1989, he was awarded the Trinity Cross, Trinidad and Tobago's highest national honour. He received a knighthood in Britain in 1990, and in 2001, the Nobel Prize in Literature.

== See also ==
- Literature of the Caribbean
- Culture of the Caribbean
