= Among the Believers =

1981 book by V. S. Naipaul

- First edition
- Author: V. S. Naipaul
- Language: English
- Genre: Travel literature
- Publisher: André Deutsch
- Publication date: 1981
- Publication place: United Kingdom
- Media type: Print
- Pages: 430

Among the Believers: An Islamic Journey is a book by the Nobel laureate V. S. Naipaul. Published in 1981, the book describes a six-month journey across the Asian continent after the Iranian Revolution. V.S. Naipaul explores the culture and the explosive situation in countries where Islamic fundamentalism was growing. His travels start with Iran, on to Pakistan, Malaysia and end in Indonesia, with a short stop in Pakistan and Iran on the return to the UK.

== Purpose ==
The proposed aim of the author was to study cultures which have a long pre-Islamic history and their modern attempts to establish a religious state. Naipaul does not include Arab countries as he is interested in "converted peoples".

== Travels ==
Iran: he went to Iran just after the revolution and could listen to all the mixed voices, guided around the holy places like Qom by a communist, Behzad. Ayatollah Sadegh Khalkhali is interviewed.

Pakistan: His earlier book An Area of Darkness was banned in India, and here he gives a controversial portrait of Pakistan. Naipaul's views on Islam in the Indian sub-continent have been contested by William Dalrymple, for example.

Malaysia: Naipaul meets with the famous Anwar Ibrahim, when he is a rising star. Anwar had been to Iran and met Ayatollah Khomeini, and he wanted to awake Malaysian people.

Indonesia: He describes the Indonesian history, how the Japanese "liberated" them and how they later fought the Dutch until free. Islam in Indonesia is mixed with former beliefs and there are forces that want to make Islam more pure. He meet poets in Jakarta and he make a trip to visit the Koranic schools, called pesantren.

== Reception ==
A controversial work, this has been one of Naipaul's better-selling publications. It has been translated into German, Italian and Spanish.

After the book's publication, Naipaul was awarded the Jerusalem Prize.

In 1998 Naipaul published a sequel Beyond Belief: Islamic Excursions among the Converted Peoples.
