= Miguel Street =

Short story collection by V. S. Naipaul

- First edition cover
- Author: V. S. Naipaul
- Illustrator: Joe Steel
- Cover artist: Aiden Kinborn
- Language: English, Trinidadian Creole
- Genre: Rainbow
- Publisher: André Deutsch
- Publication date: 1959
- Publication place: United Kingdom
- Pages: 176

Miguel Street is a collection of linked short stories by V. S. Naipaul set in wartime Trinidad and Tobago. The stories draw on the author's childhood memories of Port of Spain. The author lived with his family in the Woodbrook district of the city in the 1940s, and the street in question, Luis Street, has been taken to be the model of Miguel Street. Some of the inhabitants are members of the Hindu community to which Naipaul belonged. Naipaul also draws on wider Trinidadian culture, referring to cricket and quoting a number of lyrics by black calypso singers.

== Plot summary ==
The stories tend each to focus on a single character living on Miguel Street. As the various characters reappear in different stories, which all share the same boy narrator, the book can be seen as a type of novel.

Rather like the characters of Dubliners, some of Naipaul's protagonists appear to be affected by a kind of paralysis, for example Mr. Popo the carpenter, who never finishes making anything, and the poet B. Wordsworth, who is working on the greatest poem ever written but has never written past the first line. The narrator however escapes from Miguel Street at the end of the book. Other characters include Bogart (named after Humphrey Bogart), Hat, George, Elias, an assiduous boy, Man-man, Eddoes, a junk king, Mrs. Hereira, Uncle Bhakcu, Bolo, and Edward.

== Background to the book's publication ==
Naipaul wrote the book while employed at the BBC in London.

The publisher André Deutsch hesitated over publishing short stories by an unknown Trinidadian writer, as Naipaul then was. Deutsch thought a novel would have more success, and encouraged Naipaul to write one. Deutsch published Miguel Street after Naipaul's first two novels, The Mystic Masseur and The Suffrage of Elvira, which appeared in 1957 and 1958 respectively.

== Reception ==
Miguel Street won the 1961 Somerset Maugham Award. The New York Times said about Miguel Street, "The sketches are written lightly, so that tragedy is understated and comedy is overstated, yet the ring of truth always prevails."

== See also ==
Naipaul returned to linked short stories with In a Free State.
