= Half a Life (novel) =

2001 novel by V. S. Naipaul

Half a life
- First edition
- Author: V. S. Naipaul
- Language: English
- Publisher: Knopf
- Publication date: 2001
- Publication place: United Kingdom
- Media type: Print (Hardback & Paperback)
- Pages: 211 pp
- ISBN: 0-375-40737-5
- OCLC: 48127889
- LC Class: PR9272.9.N32 H55 2001

Half a Life is a 2001 novel by Nobel laureate V. S. Naipaul published by Alfred A. Knopf. The novel is set in India, Africa and Europe (London, Berlin and Portugal). Half a Life was long listed for the Booker prize (2001).

== Plot summary ==
Willie Somerset Chandran is the son of a Brahmin father and a Dalit mother. His father gave him his middle name as a homage to the English writer Somerset Maugham who had visited the father in the temple where the father was living under a vow of silence. Having come to despise his father for giving him a split identity, Willie leaves India to go to 1950s London to study. There he leads a life as a different man with an interesting background 'oriental' and fakes the facts of his life. Later in London he writes a book of short stories and manages to publish it.

Willie receives a letter from Ana, a mixed Portuguese and black African girl, who admires his book, and they arrange to meet. They fall in love and Willie follows her to her country (an unnamed Portuguese colony in Africa, presumably Mozambique). Meanwhile, Willie's sister Sarojini marries a German and moves to Berlin. The novel ends with Willie having moved to his sister's place in Berlin after his 18-year stay in Africa.

Having discovered that he's been living other people's lives and mimicking their behaviours to hide his past, it is implied at the end that he drops the mask and comes to peace with his background.

Half a Life is a prequel to Naipaul's 2004 novel Magic Seeds which starts with Willie in Berlin.
