= India: A Million Mutinies Now =

1990 nonfiction book by V. S. Naipaul

- First edition
- Author: V. S. Naipaul
- Series: The Indian Trilogy
- Genre: Travel writing
- Publisher: Heinemann
- Publication date: 1990
- Pages: 521 (hardcover first edition)
- ISBN: 0434510270
- Preceded by: India: A Wounded Civilization

India: A Million Mutinies Now is a nonfiction book by V. S. Naipaul published in 1990. It is a travelogue written during the author's sojourn in his ancestral land of India. It is the final volume of Naipaul's Indian trilogy, which also includes An Area of Darkness and India: A Wounded Civilization. True to his style, the narration is anecdotal, using examples and specificity in its descriptions.

Naipaul expresses serious misgivings about Indian attitudes and the Indian way of life. On the other hand, he notes the economic growth and its associated emancipation of the various peoples of India. The title makes an analogy between the emancipation of millions and the Mutiny of 1857. The book is somewhat optimistic about the country and its peoples.
