= The Mimic Men =

1967 novel by V. S. Naipaul

- First edition
- Author: V. S. Naipaul
- Language: English
- Genre: Postcolonial fiction
- Publisher: Andre Deutsch
- Publication date: 1967
- Publication place: United Kingdom

The Mimic Men is a novel by V. S. Naipaul, first published by Andre Deutsch in the UK in 1967.

== Introduction ==
Not long after finishing A Flag on the Island, Naipaul began work on the novel The Mimic Men, though for almost a year he did not make significant progress. At the end of this period, he was offered a Writer-in-Residence fellowship at Makerere University in Kampala, Uganda. There, in early 1966, Naipaul began to rewrite his material, and went on to complete the novel quickly. The finished novel broke new ground for him. Unlike his earlier fiction, it is not comic. It does not unfold chronologically. Its language is allusive and ironic, and its overall structure is whimsical. It has strands of both fiction and non-fiction, a precursor of Naipaul's approach in later novels. It is intermittently dense, even obscure, but it also has beautiful passages, especially in the descriptions of the fictional tropical island of Isabella. The subject of sex appears explicitly for the first time in Naipaul's work.

== Plot summary ==
The plot, to the extent that there is one, is centred on Ralph Singh, an Indo-Caribbean politician from Isabella who narrates in the first person. Singh is in exile in London and attempting to write his political memoirs. Earlier, in the immediate aftermath of decolonisation in a number of British colonies in the late 1950s and early 1960s, Singh shared political power with a more powerful Afro-Caribbean politician. Soon the memoirs take on a more personal aspect. There are flashbacks to the formative and defining periods of Singh's life. In many of these, during crucial moments, whether during his childhood, his married life, or his political career, he appears to abandon engagement and enterprise. He rationalises later that these belong only to fully made societies.

== Characters ==
- Ralph Ranjit Kripal Singh or Ralph Singh, the first-person narrator, born and raised on Isabella, to which he returns, after a brief stay in England, to start a career as a businessman and, later, as a politician
- Pa, later Gurudeva, Singh's father
- Nana, Singh's maternal grandfather and owner of the Bella Bella Bottling Company on Isabella; dies at the end of the Second World War, bequeathing a sugar cane estate to Ralph
- Cecil, Nana's son and Singh's mother's brother, not much older than Ralph
- Sally, Cecil's elder sister, with whom Singh has a fling
- Sandra, a student in London whom Ralph Singh later marries and with whom he moves to Isabella
- Browne, Singh's classmate at Isabella Imperial High School, later co-editor of The Socialist, partner in politics and Chief Minister of Isabella
- Deschampsneufs, an old French family on Isabella, originally slave-owning
- Champ Deschampsneufs, classmate of Singh at Isabella Imperial High School, and before that at Isabella Boys School
- Wendy Deschampsneufs, Champ's sister
- Roger Deschampsneufs, Champ's father
- Sir Hugh Clifford, former British Governor of Isabella, who instituted the Malaya Cup, a horse race; in real life Sir Hugh was Colonial Secretary of Trinidad from 1903 to 1912
- Tamango, the Deschampsneufs' entry in the horse race, later killed by someone, a suspected Hindu, perhaps even Singh's father, Gurudeva
- Major Grant, Latin master at Isabella Imperial
- Hok, another classmate of Singh, who dreams about his Chinese ancestry
- Eden, another classmate of Singh's at Isabella Imperial
- Dalip, son of Gurudeva's mistress
- Mr Shylock, owner of the boarding house in which Singh lives upon arriving in London soon after the end of the Second World War
- Lieni, the Maltese housekeeper in the boarding house
- The Murals, who become Singh's landlords after he moves out of Mr Shylock's boarding house
- Mrs Ellis, the landlady at the time of Ralph Singh's engagement to Sandra.
- Lord Stockwell, British owner of estates on Isabella
- Lady Stella Stockwell, Stockwell's daughter, with whom Singh has a brief affair.

== Reception ==
When The Mimic Men was published, it received generally positive critical notice. In particular, Caribbean politicians such as Michael Manley and Eric Williams weighed in, the latter writing, "V. S. Naipaul's description of West Indians as 'mimic men' is harsh but true ..."

== Works cited ==
- Dooley, Gillian (2006), V.S. Naipaul, Man and Writer, University of South Carolina Press, ISBN 978-1-57003-587-6
- French, Patrick (2008), The World Is What It Is: The Authorized Biography of V. S. Naipaul, New York: Alfred Knopf, ISBN 978-0-307-27035-1
- King, Bruce (2003), V.S. Naipaul (2nd ed.), Palgrave Macmillan, ISBN 978-1-4039-0456-0

== Editions ==
=== English ===
- London: Andre Deutsch, 1967 [no ISBN].
- New York: Macmillan, 1967 [no ISBN].
- London: Readers Union, 1968 [no ISBN].
- Harmondsworth: Penguin, 1969 [no ISBN].
- New York: Vintage Books USA, 1985 ISBN 0394732324.
- Harmondsworth: Penguin, 1992 ISBN 0140029400.
- London: Picador, 2001 ISBN 0330487108.
- New York: Vintage International, 2001 ISBN 9780375707179.
- reissue with a new preface by the author, London: Picador, 2011 ISBN 9780330522922. W

=== Other languages ===
- Los Simuladores, translated by Jordi Beltran Ferrer, Madrid: Random House, 2009 ISBN 9788483469842
