= The Enigma of Arrival =

1987 novel by V. S. Naipaul

- First edition
- Author: V. S. Naipaul
- Cover artist: Giorgio de Chirico, The Enigma of the Arrival and the Afternoon - 1910
- Language: English
- Genre: Autobiographical novel
- Publisher: Viking Press
- Publication date: March 1987
- Publication place: United Kingdom
- Media type: Print (Hardback & Paperback)
- Pages: 318
- ISBN: 0-670-81576-4
- OCLC: 17651091
- Dewey Decimal: 823/.914 19
- LC Class: PR9272.9.N32 E5 1987b

The Enigma of Arrival: A Novel in Five Sections is a 1987 novel by Nobel laureate V. S. Naipaul.

Mostly an autobiography, the book is composed of five sections that reflect the growing familiarity and changing perceptions of Naipaul upon his arrival in various countries after leaving his native Trinidad and Tobago.

Most of the action of the novel takes place in Wiltshire, England, where Naipaul has rented a cottage in the countryside. On first arriving, he sees the area surrounding his cottage as a frozen piece of history, unchanged for hundreds of years. However, as his stay at the cottage where he is working on another book becomes extended, he begins to see the area for what it is: a constantly changing place with ordinary people simply living lives away from the rest of the world. This causes Naipaul to reflect upon the nature of our perceptions of our surroundings and how much these perceptions are affected by our own pre-conceptions of a place.

He re-examines his own emigration from Trinidad to New York City, and his subsequent removal to England and Oxford. Naipaul's narration illustrates the growing understanding of his place in this new environment and the intricate relations of the people and the land around them.

His landlord is modelled on his real-life landlord Stephen Tennant (1906–1987), a 1920s socialite and a "bright young thing" who is also the model for the Hon. Miles Malpractice in novels by Evelyn Waugh and for Cedric Hampton in Love in a Cold Climate by Nancy Mitford. Naipaul rented a cottage at Tennant's Wilsford House estate, north of Salisbury.

When the Swedish Academy awarded the 2001 Nobel Prize in Literature to Naipaul they singled out The Enigma of Arrival as "his masterpiece", calling it "an unrelenting image of the placid collapse of the old colonial ruling culture and the decline of European neighbourhoods".
