= Magic Seeds =

2004 novel by V. S. Naipaul

- First UK edition (publ. Picador)
- Author: V. S. Naipaul
- Language: English
- Publication date: 2004

Magic Seeds is a 2004 novel by British writer V. S. Naipaul published by Knopf in the US and Picador in the UK. The novel is set in India and Europe (Berlin and London). It has been compared with E. M. Forster's A Passage to India.

== Plot summary ==
Magic Seeds is a sequel to Naipaul's 2001 novel Half a Life. Magic Seeds takes over where "Half a Life" left off – with Willie Somerset Chandran, a transplanted Indian, living with his sister Sarojini in Berlin. He was forced to come to Germany after a revolution in an unnamed African country (presumably Mozambique) forced him into exile. He had spent 18 years in Africa, and is ill at ease in the urban European setting. His sister arranges for him to return to India and while there, he becomes involved with communist guerrillas. He accepts this mission, but without any real sense of commitment to the rebels cause. He is quickly disillusioned with the guerrillas – their personal shortcomings and the ill-advised tactics of the movement – but remains involved with them partly out of inertia and partly out of fear that his former comrades might kill him. Eventually he gets captured and imprisoned, and finds life in prison preferable to a life on the run. He gets released from the prison when his English friend Roger arranges for an old collection of his short stories to be republished, which causes some embarrassment to the Indian government. Willie moves to London, and there he finds himself in an upper-middle class social set, and he slowly drifts into the life in the suburbs, with all its ironies and quiet sense of claustrophobia.
