= The Mystic Masseur (novel) =

1957 comic novel by V. S. Naipaul

- First edition cover
- Author: V. S. Naipaul
- Cover artist: Robert Micklewright
- Language: English
- Genre: Contemporary fiction
- Publisher: André Deutsch (UK); Vanguard Press (US)
- Publication date: 1957
- Publication place: United Kingdom
- Media type: Print
- Pages: 215

The Mystic Masseur is a comic novel by V. S. Naipaul. It is set in colonial Trinidad and was published in London in 1957.

The novel is about a frustrated writer of Indian descent who rises from an impoverished background to become a successful politician on the back of his dubious talent as a 'mystic' masseur — a masseur who can cure illnesses.

== Plot summary ==
The Mystic Masseur follows the life of Ganesh Ramsumair, a Trinidadian of Indian heritage. As a young man, Ganesh attends a training college for teachers, and after graduation, he begins working as a primary school teacher in the Port of Spain, Trinidad’s capital. However, he quickly loses interest in this profession and returns to his hometown of Fourways, where he learns that his father has just died. Ganesh plans to be either a writer or a professional masseur, and he befriends a local shop owner named Ramlogan. Ramlogan has a 16-year-old daughter named Leela, and Leela and Ganesh soon marry. After the wedding, Ganesh demands a large dowry payment from Ramlogan, which angers the latter.

Ganesh and Leela go to live in the small rural village of Fuente Grove, and he befriends a shop owner there named Beharry. Beharry encourages Ganesh to read and become a writer, and Ganesh orders several hundred books by mail to comprise his personal library. He reads the books and makes notes, but Leela becomes frustrated by the lack of progress Ganesh makes with actually writing. She leaves Ganesh and returns to Fourways to live with her father again. Ganesh spends the next five weeks writing an educational text about Hinduism, and when he finishes it, he has hired a print shop to make copies of his book. He brings the book to Leela and Ramlogan, and they are ecstatic that he has written a book. However, Ramlogan becomes furious when he sees that the book is dedicated to Beharry rather than Leela or himself.

Leela returns to Ganesh, but Ganesh’s book does not sell well. Ganesh decides to become a mystic and a religious healer. His first client is a mother who says that a malevolent black cloud has been following her son. Ganesh performs a ritual over the boy, who then says that the black cloud is gone. Ganesh becomes a very successful mystic, but he soon discovers that the five local taxis are overcharging passengers to come to his home. He also discovers that the taxis are all owned by Ramlogan. He goes to Ramlogan and says that he wishes to buy the taxis from him and that if Ramlogan refuses, Ganesh will simply buy his own taxis and have them charge reasonable rates. Ramlogan, furious but defeated, agrees to sell the taxis to Ganesh.

Ganesh, having gained considerable personal wealth, invests his money in Fuente Grove’s businesses and infrastructure, and the village begins to prosper. One day, Hindu organizers approach Ganesh and inform him that C.S. Narayan, the president of the Trinidad Hindu Association, has been embezzling funds from the organization. Ganesh and the organizers publicize Narayan’s malfeasance by publishing their own newspaper. Soon, Narayan is voted out of his position in the organization, and Ganesh is voted in as the new president. Ganesh then decides to campaign for a position in the Legislative Council of Trinidad, and he wins easily, having gained widespread fame and popularity by this point. However, while he intends to fight for the wellbeing of Trinidad’s downtrodden, he is soon stymied by the politics of the Legislative Council and must instead follow the lead of the other Council members.

== Publication and critical reception ==
The publisher André Deutsch encouraged Naipaul to write a novel after seeing the manuscript of his collection of short stories, Miguel Street.

The Mystic Masseur won the John Llewellyn Rhys Prize in 1958.

== Film ==
The novel was the first by Naipaul to be filmed. The 2001 film adaptation, The Mystic Masseur, is a Merchant Ivory production.
