= The Writer and the World =

- First edition (US)
- Author: V. S. Naipaul
- Language: English
- Genre: Essays
- Publisher: Picador (UK); Alfred A. Knopf (US)
- Publication date: 13 August 2002
- Publication place: United Kingdom
- Media type: Print (hardcover & paperback)
- Pages: 544
- ISBN: 0-375-40739-1
- Dewey Decimal: 824/.914 21
- LC Class: PR9272.9.N32 W74 2002

The Writer and the World: Essays (2002) is a collection of essays and reportage, many previously published, spanning the 50-year career of Trinidad-born British writer V. S. Naipaul. The book contains some of Naipaul's most notable essays on post-colonial India, Trinidad, and Zaire. Originally published in the United States by Knopf, it was issued in paperback by Vintage in 2003. The book is edited and introduced by Pankaj Mishra.
