= A Turn in the South =

1989 travelogue by V. S. Naipaul

- First edition
- Author: V. S. Naipaul
- Language: English
- Genre: Travelogue
- Publisher: Viking Press
- Publication date: 1989
- Publication place: United Kingdom
- Media type: Print
- Pages: 307
- ISBN: 0-670-82415-1
- OCLC: 59695297

A Turn in the South is a travelogue of the Southern United States by V. S. Naipaul. The book was published in 1989 and is based on the author's travels across the South.

Naipaul had previously written fiction and non-fiction books about life in the Caribbean, India, Africa and South America. The object of this book is to compare U.S. states such as South Carolina, Florida and Mississippi to their geographical neighbors, the nations of the Caribbean. He discusses topics such as Martin Luther King Jr., the South's economy, technology, industrialization, tourism, religion, rednecks, the legacy of slavery, and racism.
