= India: A Wounded Civilization =

1977 book by V. S. Naipaul

- First edition
- Author: V. S. Naipaul
- Language: English
- Series: India
- Genre: Non-fiction
- Publisher: André Deutsch, Knopf
- Publication date: 1977
- ISBN: 978-0-394-40291-8
- Preceded by: An Area of Darkness
- Followed by: India: A Million Mutinies Now

India: A Wounded Civilization (1977), by V. S. Naipaul, is the second book of his "India" trilogy, after An Area of Darkness, and before India: A Million Mutinies Now. Naipaul came to write this book on his third visit to India. The book includes Naipaul's self evaluation and introspection of his views on India including poverty and suffering, while focussing more on history, religion and social structure in this book.
