= The Middle Passage (book) =

1962 non-fiction book by V. S. Naipaul

The Middle Passage: The Caribbean Revisited
- First edition
- Author: V. S. Naipaul
- Genre: Travel writing
- Publisher: André Deutsch
- Publication date: 1962
- Publication place: United Kingdom
- Pages: 232 (first edition)

The Middle Passage: The Caribbean Revisited is a 1962 book-length essay and travelogue by V. S. Naipaul. It is his first book-length work of non-fiction.

The book covers a year-long trip Naipaul took through Trinidad, British Guiana, Suriname, Martinique, and Jamaica in 1961. As well as giving his own impressions, Naipaul refers to the work of earlier travellers such as Patrick Leigh Fermor, who described a similar itinerary in The Traveller's Tree (1950). Naipaul addresses a range of topics including the legacy of slavery and colonialism, race relations, the roles of immigrants from India in the various countries, and differences in language, culture, and economics.

The book was poorly received in Trinidad and other Caribbean nations on account of Naipaul's "patronising attitude" towards these colonies and ex-colonies, his apparent approval of imperialism, among other reasons.
