= Beyond Belief: Islamic Excursions Among the Converted Peoples =

1998 book by V. S. Naipaul

Beyond Belief: Islamic Excursions among the Converted Peoples
- First edition (UK)
- Author: V. S. Naipaul
- Language: English
- Publisher: Little, Brown (UK); Random House (US)
- Publication date: 1998
- Publication place: United Kingdom
- Media type: Print (Hardback & Paperback)
- Pages: 408 pp (first edition, hardback)

Beyond Belief: Islamic Excursions among the Converted Peoples is a non-fiction book by V. S. Naipaul published by Vintage Books in 1998. It was written as a sequel to Naipaul's Among the Believers: An Islamic Journey (1981).

== Summary ==
Naipaul draws a distinction between Arab countries and the countries of "converted peoples" where the adoption of Islam involves to some extent the adoption of Arabic culture. The book describes his five-month journey in 1995 revisiting four Muslim countries: Indonesia, Iran, Pakistan and Malaysia. Naipaul also documents the ongoing Islamization of native cultures: central to the stories of Indonesia and Malaysia is the presence of Islamic radicals trying to purge what remained of the native cultures, such as their rituals, faith in spirits, and taboos.

Naipaul takes the view that "The British period--two hundred years in some places, less than a hundred years in others--was a time of Hindu regeneration."

== Reception ==
Beyond Belief has been criticized notably by Eqbal Ahmad, who regarded its view of Islam as erroneous. Ahmed Rashid, a personal friend of Eqbal's, appears in the book as the character "Shabaz".

Reviewing it in The Sunday Times Patrick French wrote that "The human encounters are described minutely, superbly, picking up inconsistencies in people’s tales, catching the uncertainties and the nuances." Later, in his authorised biography of Naipaul, he wrote that "Most of the converts in question changed faith somewhere between the seventh and eleventh century, yet Naipaul’s sense of the past is so intense, so profound, that he sees them as rejectors of their indigenous belief, engaged in 'a dreadful mangling of history', and suffering from resultant 'neurosis'. Conversion to Islam and the ensuing emphasis on foreign holy places is for him 'the most uncompromising kind of imperialism'. He does not consider the possibility that Islam might, over the centuries, have become an indigenous religion, while his claim that, 'Everyone not an Arab who is a Muslim is a convert' might just as well be made about Christianity."
