= A Bend in the River =

1979 novel by V. S. Naipaul

- First edition
- Author: V. S. Naipaul
- Language: English
- Publisher: Alfred A Knopf
- Publication date: May 1979
- Publication place: Trinidad and Tobago
- Media type: Print
- Pages: 278 pages
- ISBN: 0-394-50573-5
- OCLC: 4494403
- Dewey Decimal: 823/.9/14
- LC Class: PZ4.N155 Be 1979 PR9272.9.N32

A Bend in the River is a 1979 novel by Nobel laureate V. S. Naipaul.

The novel, telling the story of Salim, a merchant in post-colonial mid-20th century Africa, is one of Naipaul's best known works and was widely praised. It was shortlisted for the Booker Prize in 1979. In 1998, the Modern Library ranked A Bend in the River #83 on its list of the 100 best English-language novels of the 20th century. A Bend in the River has also been criticized for a perceived defence of European colonialism in Africa.

== Plot ==
The world is what it is; men who are nothing, who allow themselves to become nothing, have no place in it.

— A Bend in the River, opening line

Set in an unnamed African country after independence, the book is narrated by Salim, an ethnically Indian Muslim and a shopkeeper in a small but growing city in the country's remote interior. Salim observes the rapid changes in Africa with an outsider's distance.

Salim grows up in the community of Indian traders on the east coast of Africa. Feeling insecure about his future in East Africa, he buys a business from Nazruddin in a town at "a bend in the river" in the heart of Africa. When he moves there he finds the town decrepit, a "ghost town", its former European suburb reclaimed by the bush, and many of its European vestiges ruined in a "rage" by the locals in response to their suppression and humiliation during colonial times. Old tribal distinctions have become important again. Salim trades in what people in the villages need: pencils and paper, pots and pans, other household utensils. Soon he is joined by an assistant, Metty, who comes from a family of house slaves that his family had maintained in the east. One of his steady customers is Zabeth, a "marchande" from a village and a magician too. Zabeth has a son, Ferdinand, by a man of another tribe, and asks Salim to help him get educated. Ferdinand attends the local lycée run by Father Huismans, a Belgian priest who collects African masks and is considered a "lover of Africa". Life in the town is slowly improving. Salim's decision to move there seems to be vindicated when he learns that the Indian community on the east coast is being persecuted, but he still does not feel secure. Mahesh, a fellow Indian trader, says that the local Africans are "malins" (i.e. wicked), "because they lived with the knowledge of men as prey". A rebellion breaks out and the Indian merchants live in fear. Soon white mercenaries appear and restore order. After peace has returned Father Huismans goes on a trip. He is killed by unknown assailants and nobody cares. Afterwards his collection of African masks is denounced as an affront to African religion. An American visitor pillages most of the masks and ships them home as "the richest products of the forest".

The town now develops into a trading centre for the region. Government agencies spring up. European salesmen and visitors arrive. Salim's friends Mahesh and Shoba become successful with their new Bigburger franchise. The new army arrives, "poachers of ivory and thieves of gold". Portraits of the President, "the Big Man", are displayed everywhere. A new section of town is built, the "State Domain", to showcase the President's vision of a new Africa. Yet buildings are shoddy, the tractors at the agricultural centre never get put to work, and much of the Domain falls quickly into disrepair. Salim calls it a "hoax". The Domain is soon converted into a university and conference centre.

Salim is visited by Indar, who grew up with him on the east coast, then went to England to study and now has become a lecturer at the new institution. He takes Salim to a party in the Domain to meet Yvette and Raymond, an expatriate European couple. Raymond had been the advisor and mentor of the President. Although charismatic and admired, he finds himself outside the centre of power, his influence with the President seemingly in eclipse. Loyal to the President, he continues to write for him, hoping to be recalled to the capital.

Salim, whose experience with women has been limited to prostitutes, is intrigued by Yvette, Raymond's much younger wife. Salim and Yvette start an adulterous affair right under Raymond's eyes. But the affair ends abruptly when Salim, seized by sudden jealousy, beats her badly and sends her away.

Raymond's attempt to please the Big Man by editing a collection of his speeches is not successful. Instead the President publishes "a very small, brief book of thoughts, Maximes, two or three thoughts to each page, each thought about four or five lines long". Like others, Salim is forced to buy copies of the book for distribution. The local youth group displeases the President and is denounced in one of his propaganda speeches. As a result, unrest grows, corruption and extortion become more prevalent, and a "Liberation Army" forms underground. They reject the President, his cult of the black Madonna (modeled on the President's mother), and his vision of Africa, calling to return to the "truthful laws" of the ancestors.

Salim looks for a way out. He travels to London, where he meets Nazruddin. Nazruddin sold his business to Salim, moved to Uganda, left it because of persecution, moved then to Canada, left it because of its capitalistic rapaciousness, and finally landed in London, where he became a landlord. He bemoans the lack of security for honest businessmen: there is no safe place. Salim becomes engaged to Nazruddin's daughter, but soon returns to his place in Africa. Upon arrival he learns that his business has been expropriated under the President's new programme of "radicalization" and transferred to a local. Théotime, a "state trustee", is ignorant and lazy, and retains Salim as manager and chauffeur. Salim recognises that all is lost. He has hidden some ivory on his property, but, betrayed by Metty, is found out and put in jail. He is presented to the commissioner, Ferdinand, who has moved up in the administration after receiving training in the capital. Ferdinand tells him that there is no safety, no hope, and that everybody is in fear of his life: "We’re all going to hell, and every man knows this in his bones. We’re being killed. Nothing has any meaning." He sets Salim free and tells him to leave the country. Salim takes the last steamer before the President arrives. During the night there is a battle on the ship, as rebels try to hijack it. The attack is repelled, but the attached barge, full of Africans, is snapped loose and drifts down the river.

== Latin mottos ==
Miscerique probat populos et foedera jungi

— A Bend in the River, Motto of the town

This Latin phrase is still visible to Salim on the granite base of a ruined European monument near the dock. Later Father Huismans explains him its meaning. "He approves of the mingling of the peoples and their bonds of union", derived from Virgil's Aeneid, Book IV, line 112. Aeneas lands on the shores of Africa, falls in love with Queen Dido and wants to settle, putting his mission, the migration to Italy, in danger. The gods intervene: they do not approve of a settlement in Africa nor of the mingling of the peoples. In the motto, however, three words were altered to reverse the original meaning.

A second Latin phrase is encountered by Salim: Semper aliquod novi, the motto of the lycée. The original phrase by Pliny the Elder meant that there is always something new out of Africa (ex Africa). Huismans applied it jokingly to the unique masks and carvings with religious quality he had collected.

== Comments ==
Naipaul is recognised as a "magnificent novelist", and A Bend in the River has been described as a "full-bodied masterpiece". Yet he has been accused of being a "neo-colonialist", and in this novel post-colonial Africa is depicted as spiralling into a kind of Hell. He has also been accused of being "infected by an ancestral communal resentment" against blacks. Jennifer Seymour Whitaker indicates that Salim's plight as an outsider, a member of the Indian community in Africa, is credibly rendered, but takes Naipaul to task for ascribing to African people a "mysterious malevolence".

Irving Howe admires Naipaul's "almost Conradian gift for tensing a story", the psychic and moral tension of the novel, and its "serious involvement with human issues". Howe rejects the notion that Naipaul is an apologist of colonialism. He contrasts the foreground space occupied by Salim with the background acts set in motion by the Big Man. The Big Man never appears but finds a voice in Raymond, the white intellectual whom the President promotes but later ignores. Howe bemoans the fact that, as he sees it, Naipaul allows "the wretchedness of his depicted scene" to become "the limit of his vision".

Selwyn Cudjoe thinks that the novel depicts "the gradual darkening of African society as it returns to its age-old condition of bush and blood" and thinks this pessimistic view indicates Naipaul's "inability to examine postcolonial societies in any depth". The novel examines "the homeless condition of the East Indian in a world he cannot call home" and shows in Salim's case his passage to free himself from "the constricting ties to his society's past".

Imraan Coovadia examines Naipaul's Latin quotations, accuses him of misquotation and manipulation, and suggests that he tries to evoke fear, disgust and condescension. Massod Raja suggests that the novel takes an essentially bourgeois perspective, Salim being interested, not in revolutionary goals, but in maintaining a profitable enterprise. He asserts that Naipaul is not a postcolonial author but a "cosmopolitan" one (as defined by Timothy Brennan), who offers an "inside view of formerly submerged peoples" for target audiences that have "metropolitan literary tastes".

In 2001, without specifically referring to this novel, the Nobel Literature Prize Committee indicated that it viewed Naipaul as Conrad's heir as the annalist of the destinies of empires in the moral sense: what they do to human beings. In Heart of Darkness, Joseph Conrad presented a dark picture of the same region at the beginning of European colonization; this type of depiction of Africa is also found recast in Naipaul's novel.

Like Conrad, who in Heart of Darkness does not name the big river, Naipaul does not name the river in this novel, nor the town at its bend, nor the country or its president. Yet there are possible identifiers. Thus the reader learns that the town is located in the heart of Africa, at the end of the navigable river, just below the cataracts, and the European colonisers had been French-speaking, perhaps Belgians. Naipaul's description has been interpreted to point to the town of Kisangani on the Congo River. A link between the "Big Man" and President Mobutu of Zaire was drawn by some reviewers. Naipaul credits his extramarital affair with Margaret Gooding for giving A Bend in the River and his later books greater fluidity, saying that these "in a way to some extent depend on her. They stopped being dry.”
