= A Writer's People =

2007 book by V.S. Naipaul

- First North American edition (Alfred A. Knopf)
- Author: V.S. Naipaul
- Subject: Writing
- Genre: Biography
- Published: 2007
- Publisher: Picador, Alfred A. Knopf
- ISBN: 9780330485241 (first edition)
- OCLC: 137313035

A Writer's People: Ways of Looking and Feeling is a non-fiction book by V. S. Naipaul, first published in 2007.

== Content ==
In this book, Naipaul discusses how the work of other writers has affected his writing. The book attracted criticism from those in British literary circles who thought that Naipaul gave uncharitable treatment to several notable authors, and in particular Anthony Powell and his novel sequence A Dance to the Music of Time, especially since Powell had been a friend of Naipaul's.
