= An Area of Darkness =

1964 book by V. S. Naipaul

- First edition cover
- Author: V. S. Naipaul
- Language: English
- Series: The Indian Trilogy
- Genre: Travel writing
- Publisher: André Deutsch
- Publication date: 1964
- Publication place: United Kingdom
- Media type: Print
- Pages: 281 (hardcover first edition)
- Followed by: India: A Wounded Civilization

An Area of Darkness is a non-fiction book written by V. S. Naipaul and published in 1964. It is a travelogue detailing Naipaul's trip through India in the early sixties. It was the first of Naipaul's Indian trilogy that includes India: A Wounded Civilization (1977) and India: A Million Mutinies Now (1990). The narration is anecdotal and descriptive.

The book is considered Naipaul's reckoning with his ancestral homeland and a sharp chronicle of his travels through 1960s India, encountering distressing poverty in the slums, corrupt government workers in the cities, and the ethereal beauty of the Himalayas. A passionate but pessimistic work, An Area of Darkness conveys the sense of disillusionment which Naipaul experienced on his first visit to India in the 1960s. The book was banned in India for its "negative portrayal of India and its people".

According to some book reviewers, the title of the book, An Area of Darkness, was not so much a reference to India of the sixties, as to Naipaul's feelings of distress and anxiety encountering poverty and suffering in India.
