= A Flag on the Island =

Book by V.S. Naipaul

- First edition cover
- Author: V. S. Naipaul
- Cover artist: Omnific
- Language: English
- Genre: Collection of Short Stories
- Published: 1967 (André Deutsch)
- Publication place: England
- Pages: 214

A Flag on the Island is a collection of short stories written by V.S. Naipaul, and first published by André Deutsch in 1967. It includes the title novella, "A Flag on the Island," outtakes from previous books such as "The Enemy", from Miguel Street, and pieces published in periodicals in Britain or the United States. The book is dedicated to Diana Athill.

== List of stories included ==
- "My Aunt Gold Teeth"
- "The Raffle"
- "A Christmas Story"
- "The Mourners"
- "The Night Watchman's Occurrence Book"
- "The Enemy"
- "Greenie and Yellow"
- "The Perfect Tenants"
- "The Heart"
- "The Baker's Story"
- "A Flag on the Island"

== Title story: "A Flag on the Island" ==
In late 1964 Naipaul was asked to write an original script for an American film. He spent the next few months in Trinidad and Tobago writing a novella, "A Flag on the Island". The finished version was not to the director's liking and the film was never made. The novella is set in 1964 in a Caribbean island that is not named. The main character is an American named "Frankie" who affects the mannerisms of Frank Sinatra. Frankie has links to the island from having served there during World War II. He revisits reluctantly when his ship anchors there during a hurricane. Naipaul wilfully makes the pace of the book feverish, the narrative haphazard, the characters loud, the protagonist fickle or deceptive, and the dialogue confusing. Balancing the present time is Frankie's less disordered, though comfortless, memory of 20 years before. Then he had become a part of a community on the island. He had tried to help his poor friends by giving away the ample U.S. Army supplies he had. Not everyone was happy about receiving help and not everyone benefited. Frankie was left chastened about finding tidy solutions to the island's social problems. This theme, indirectly developed in the story, is one to which Naipaul would return.
