= The Suffrage of Elvira =

1958 novel by V. S. Naipaul

- First edition cover
- Author: V. S. Naipaul
- Cover artist: Robert Micklewright
- Language: English
- Publisher: Andre Deutsch
- Publication date: 1958
- Publication place: United Kingdom

The Suffrage of Elvira is a comic novel by V. S. Naipaul set in colonial Trinidad. It was written in 1957, and was published in London the following year. It is a satire of the democratic process and the consequences of political change, published a few years before Trinidad and Tobago achieved independence in 1962.

== Plot summary ==
The novel describes the slapstick circumstances surrounding a local election in one of the districts of Trinidad. Its main character is Surujpat Harbans. It also delves into the multiculturalism of Trinidad, showing the effects of the election on various ethnic groups, including Muslims, Hindus, and Europeans.
