= Guerrillas (novel) =

Book by V. S. Naipaul

- First UK edition
- Author: V. S. Naipaul
- Language: English
- Publisher: André Deutsch (UK); Knopf (US)
- Publication date: 1975
- Publication place: United States
- Media type: Print (hardback & paperback)
- ISBN: 0-233-96702-8

Guerrillas is a 1975 novel by V. S. Naipaul. The book is set on an unnamed, remote Caribbean island populated by a mix of ethnicities, but dominated by post-colonial British. Probably the island is modelled after Trinidad, Naipaul's birthplace.

== Plot summary ==
The main characters of the book are Jane, a woman from London, and her romantic partner Roche, a white South African man, who have recently arrived on the island. Roche is engaged with helping the poor on the island, which puts him in contact with a dishonest revolutionary opportunist named Jimmy. As they socialize with the privileged, Roche finds Jane contradictory and politically naive about her own place in the power structure, while also being challenged about his own motives and purpose. Jimmy has sexual fantasies about Jane, and has a perverse relationship with the boys he keeps in his commune. Amid the tumult of a societal crisis, the climax of the book is violent and tragic.

== Allusions/references to actual history, geography and current science ==
Some episodes in the book are based on the life of Michael X, a Trinidad revolutionary. Naipaul wrote about Michael X in his book of essays The Return of Eva Peron and The Killings in Trinidad.

== Literary significance and criticism ==
In his review of the novel in the New York Times (November 16, 1975), Paul Theroux wrote:

Guerrillas is one of Naipaul's most complex books; it is certainly his most suspenseful, a series of shocks, like a shroud slowly unwound from a bloody corpse, showing the damaged—and familiar—face last. The island now is infertile, crowded, reeking with gas fumes and the dust from the bauxite plant. The particularities of irritation are everywhere, for this is the Third World with her disordered armies and supine population, and—with a vengeance—her camp followers. Jimmy, the fifties' pimp and sixties' black power leader, is the seventies' guerrilla; Roche, the jaded white liberal, resembles in his wronged mood a slave-owner—he is a kind of benign puppeteer; and Jane, who uses the lingo of sympathy easily ("words that she might shed at any time, as easily as she had picked them up, and forget that she had ever spoken them")—Naipaul describes her best:

"She was without memory. . . She was without consistency or even without coherence. She knew only what she was and what she had been born to; to this knowledge she was tethered; it was her stability, enabling her to adventure in security. Adventuring, she was indifferent, perhaps blind, to the contradiction between what she said and what she was so secure of being; and this indifference or blindness, this absence of the sense of the absurd, was part of her unassailability."
