= Hubert Bagster Trumper =

British doctor and writer (1902–1975)

Hubert Bagster Trumper (27 December 1902 – 1975) was an English doctor and writer (as Hubert Bagster) from Lincolnshire. He also served in the Royal Army Medical Corps.

== Biography ==
He was born in Market Rasen, Lincolnshire, on 27 December 1902. His father was Oscar Bagster Trumper (1872–1932), also a doctor.

In 1926, he was a medical student, travelling in the United States and Canada.

On 4 April 1928, he was promoted to Lieutenant in the Royal Army Medical Corps.

In 1929, he married Frances E Greener in Birmingham.

Trumper was dismissed by ICI after raising his concerns about workers being exposed to the risk of cancer.

In 1958, the New York Times called the memoir Gallstones and Ghosts "richly entertaining clinical reminiscences".

== Publications (as Hubert Bagster) ==
- Gallstones and Ghosts: The Casebook Of A Country Doctor 1957, Simon and Schuster
- Country Practice 1957, Andre Deutsch
- Doctor's Weekend 1960, Andre Deutsch
