= V. S. Naipaul =

Trinidadian writer (1932–2018)

Sir V. S. Naipaul FRAS TC
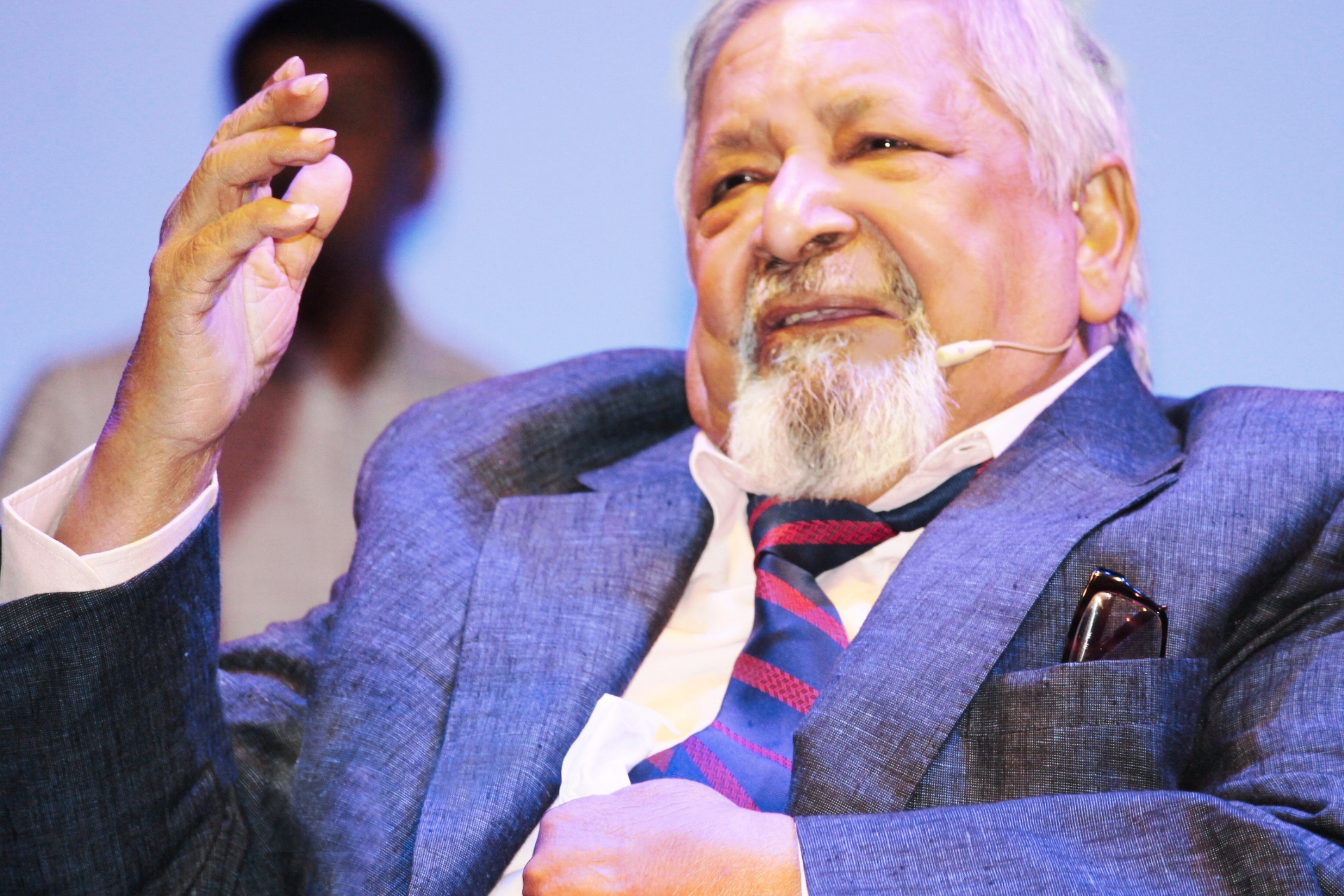
- Naipaul in 2016
- Born: Vidiadhar Surajprasad Naipaul; 17 August 1932; Chaguanas, Trinidad and Tobago
- Died: 11 August 2018 (aged 85); London, England
- Education: University College, Oxford
- Occupations: Novelist; travel writer; essayist
- Spouses: Patricia Ann Hale (m. 1955; died 1996) Nadira Khannum Alvi (m. 1996)
- Father: Seepersad Naipaul
- Relatives: Savi Naipaul Akal (sister); Shiva Naipaul (brother)
- Family: Capildeo
- Writing career
- Period: 1957–2010
- Notable works: A House for Mr Biswas (1961); In a Free State (1971); A Bend in the River (1979); The Enigma of Arrival (1987)
- Notable awards: Booker Prize (1971); Jerusalem Prize (1983); Nobel Prize in Literature (2001)

Sir Vidiadhar Surajprasad Naipaul (Note: Meaning: vidyādhar (Sanskrit and Hindi "possessed of learning", (p. 921) from vidyā (Sanskrit and Hindi "knowledge, learning", p. 921) + dhar (Sanskrit and Hindi "holding, supporting," p. 524)); sūrajprasād (from sūraj (Hindi "sun", p. 1036) + prasād (Sanskrit and Hindi "gift, boon, blessing", p. 666)) from McGregor, R. S. (1993). The Oxford Hindi–English Dictionary. Oxford University Press. ISBN 9780198643395.) (/ˈvɪdjɑːdər ˌsuːrədʒprəˈsɑːd ˈnaɪpɔːl, naɪˈpɔːl/; 17 August 1932 – 11 August 2018) was a Trinidad and Tobago-born British writer known for his works of fiction and nonfiction in English. He is known for his comic early novels set in Trinidad, his bleaker novels of alienation in the wider world, and his vigilant chronicles of life and travels. He wrote in prose that was widely admired, but his views sometimes aroused controversy. He published more than thirty books over fifty years.

Naipaul's breakthrough novel A House for Mr Biswas was published in 1961. Naipaul won the Booker Prize in 1971 for his novel In a Free State. He won the Jerusalem Prize in 1983, and was awarded the Trinity Cross, Trinidad and Tobago's highest national honour, in 1990. He received a knighthood in 1990, and the Nobel Prize in Literature in 2001.

== Life and career ==
=== Background and early life ===
"Where there had been swamp at the foot of the Northern Range, with mud huts with earthen walls that showed the damp halfway up ... there was now the landscape of Holland ... Sugarcane as a crop had ceased to be important. None of the Indian villages were like villages I had known. No narrow roads; no dark, overhanging trees; no huts; no earth yards with hibiscus hedges; no ceremonial lighting of lamps, no play of shadows on the wall; no cooking of food in half-walled verandas, no leaping firelight; no flowers along gutters or ditches where frogs croaked the night away."

— From Enigma of Arrival (1987)

V. S. Naipaul was born to Droapatie (née Capildeo) and Seepersad Naipaul on 17 August 1932 in the sugar plantation-town of Chaguanas on the island of Trinidad, the larger of the two islands in the British crown colony of Trinidad and Tobago. He was the couple's second child and first son.

Naipaul's father, Seepersad, was an English-language journalist. In 1929, he had begun contributing stories to the Trinidad Guardian, and in 1932 he joined the staff as the provincial Chaguanas correspondent. In "A prologue to an autobiography" (1983), Naipaul describes how Seepersad's great reverence for writers and for the writing life spawned the dreams and aspirations of his eldest son.

In the 1880s, Naipaul's paternal grandfather, Nyepal, had emigrated from British India to work as an indentured labourer in a sugar plantation. In the 1890s, his maternal grandfather, Capildeo, was to do the same. During this time, many people in India, their prospects blighted by the Great Famine of 1876–78, or similar calamities, had emigrated to distant outposts of the British Empire such as Trinidad and Tobago, British Guiana, Jamaica, Fiji, Mauritius, Natal, East Africa, Malaya, the French colonies of Martinique and Guadeloupe, and the Dutch colony of Suriname. Although slavery had been abolished in these places in 1833, slave labour was still in demand, and indenture was the legal contract being drawn to meet the demand.

According to the genealogy the Naipauls had reconstructed in Trinidad, they were Hindu Brahmins—embraced from the knowledge of his mother's family; his father's background had remained less certain. Their ancestors in India had been guided by ritual restrictions. Among these were those on food—including the prohibition against eating flesh—drink, attire and social interaction.

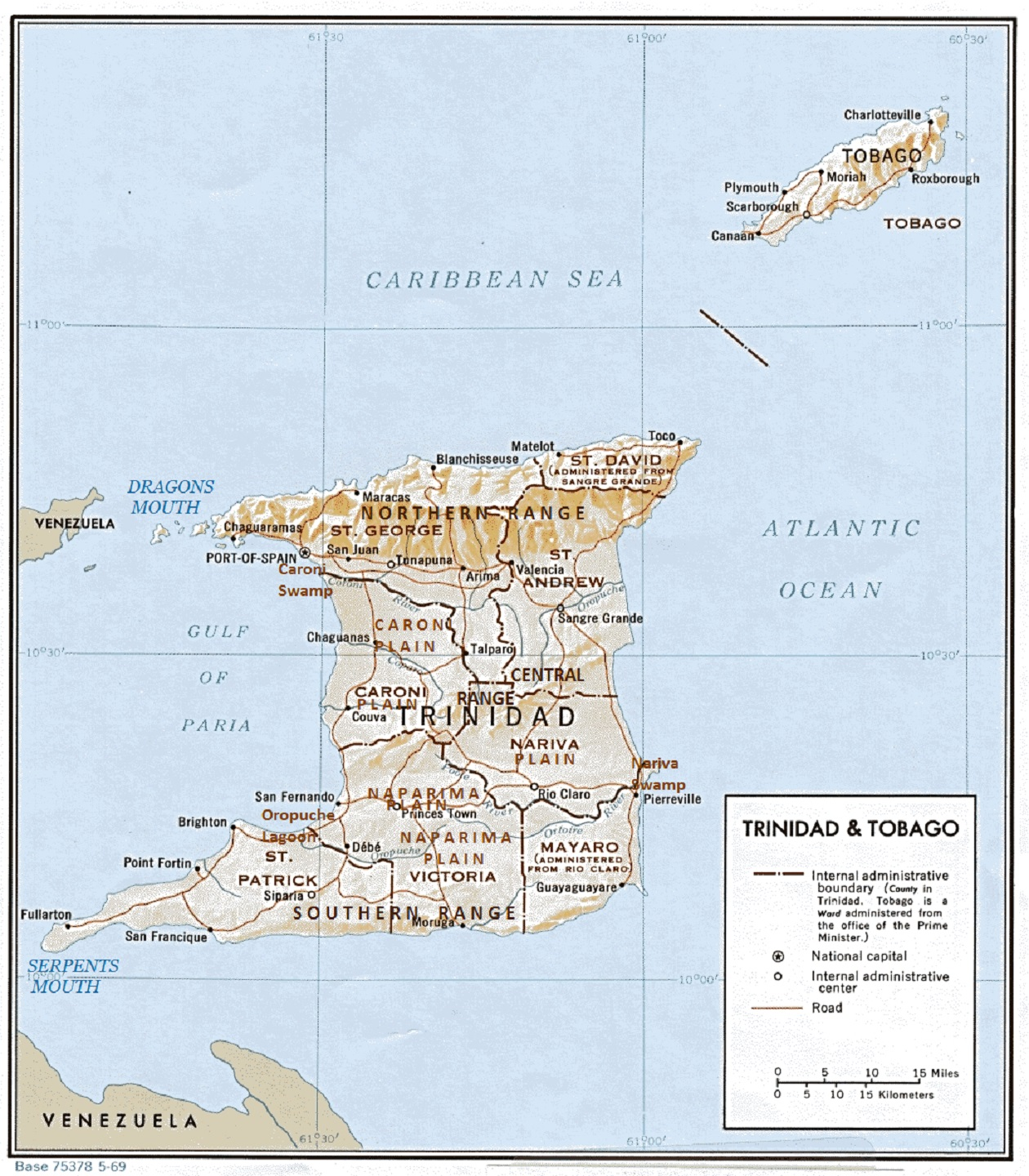
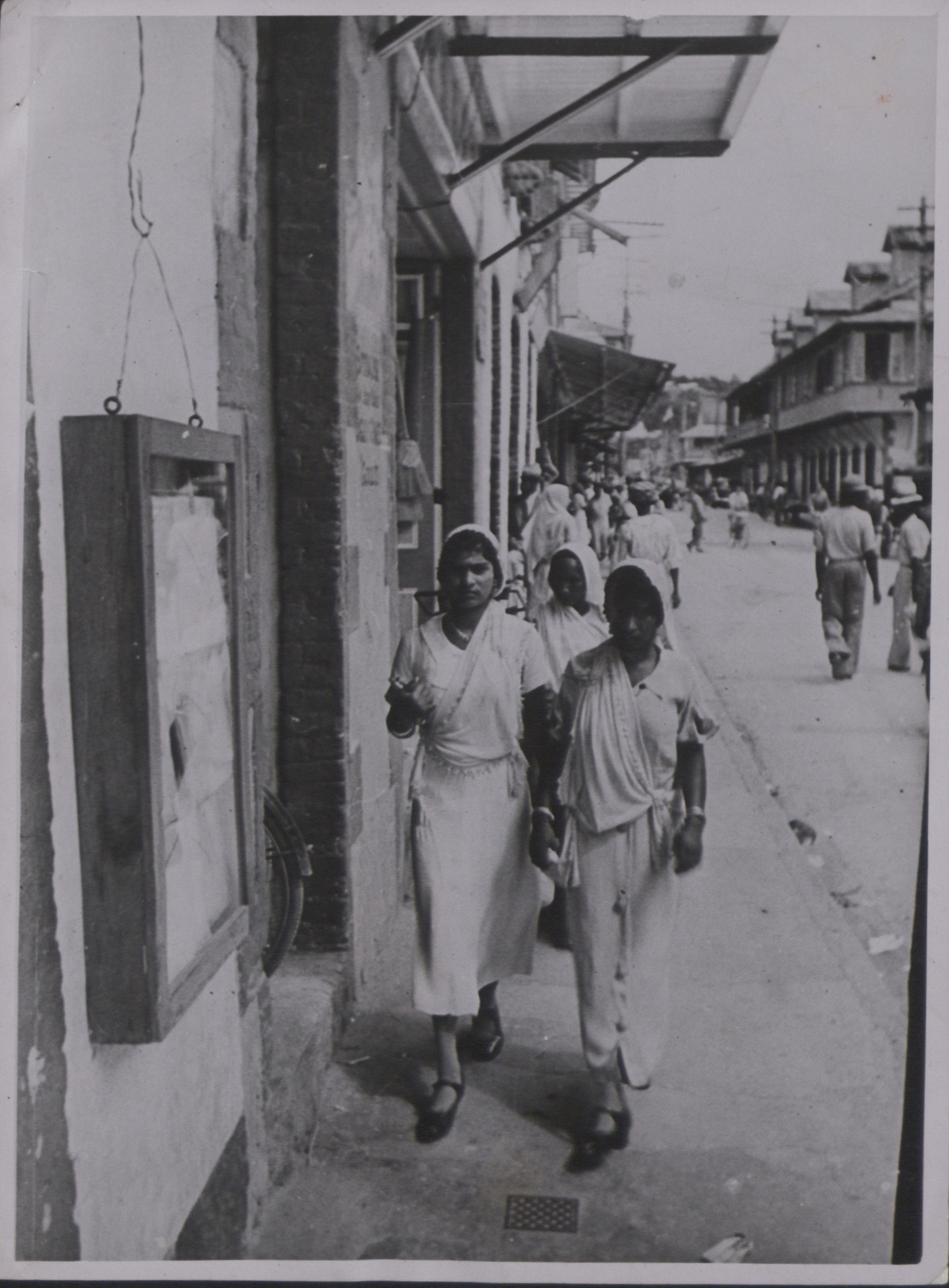
(Left) Chaguanas is just inward of the Gulf of Paria coast. County Caroni and Naparima were fictionalised as County Naparoni in Naipaul's The Suffrage of Elvira. (Right) Indian women go shopping in Port-of-Spain, Trinidad, 1945.

In Trinidad, the restrictions were to gradually loosen. By the time of Naipaul's earliest childhood memories, chicken and fish were eaten at the family's dining table, and Christmas was celebrated with a dinner. The men wore only western clothes. The women's saris were being accessorised with belts and heeled footwear, their hemlines rising in imitation of the skirt, and they were soon to disappear altogether as an item of daily wear. Disappearing as well were the languages of India. Naipaul and his siblings were encouraged to speak only English. At school, other languages were taught, but these were usually Spanish and Latin.

Naipaul's family moved to Trinidad's capital Port of Spain, at first when he was seven, and then more permanently when he was nine.

=== 1943–1954: Education: Port of Spain and Oxford ===
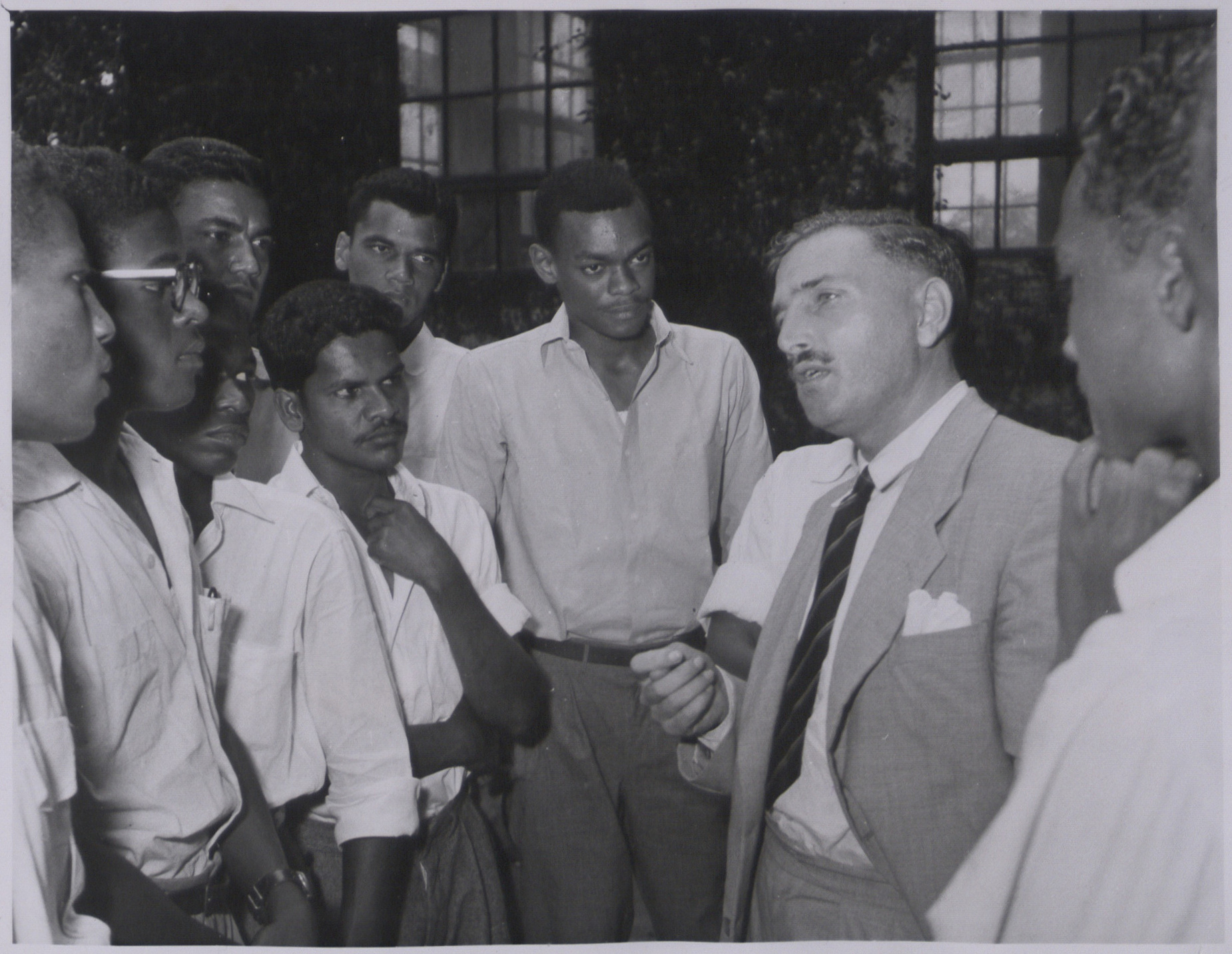
Naipaul attended the government-run Queen's Royal College (QRC), a high school, Port of Spain from 1942 to 1950. Shown here are some older students at QRC talking to a visitor in 1955.

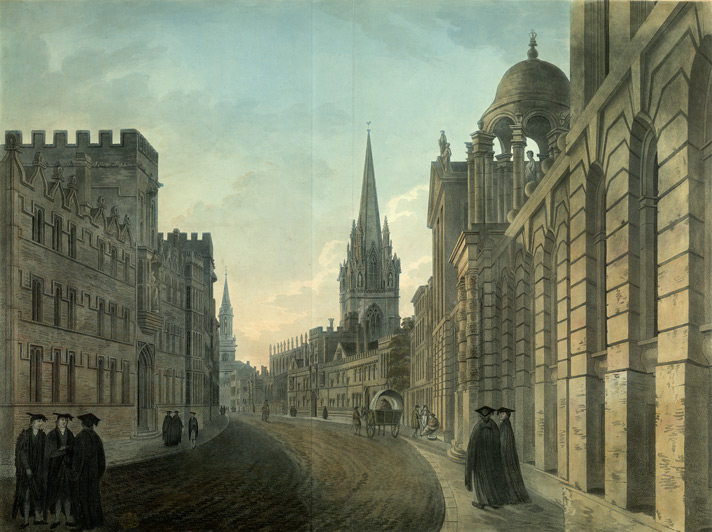
A 1790 aquatint of High Street, Oxford, showing University College in the left foreground. A century and a half later, V. S. Naipaul would spend four years at the college.

Naipaul was enrolled in the government-run Queen's Royal College (QRC), an urban, cosmopolitan, high-performing school, which was designed and functioned in the fashion of a British boys' public school. Before he turned 17, he won a Trinidad Government scholarship to study abroad. He reflected later that the scholarship would have allowed him to study any subject at any institution of higher learning in the British Commonwealth, but that he chose to go to Oxford to do a degree in English. He went, he wrote, "in order at last to write...." In August 1950, Naipaul boarded a Pan Am flight to New York, continuing the next day by boat to London. He left Trinidad, like the narrator of Miguel Street, hardening himself to the emotion displayed by his family. For recording the impressions of his journey, Naipaul purchased a pad of paper and a copying pencil, noting, "I had bought the pad and pencil because I was travelling to become a writer, and I had to start." The copious notes and letters from that time were to become the basis for the chapter "Journey" in Naipaul's novel The Enigma of Arrival, written 37 years later.

Arriving at Oxford for the Michaelmas term, 1950, Naipaul judged himself adequately prepared for his studies; in the judgement of his Latin tutor, Peter Bayley, Naipaul showed promise and poise. But, a year later, in Naipaul's estimation, his attempts at writing felt contrived. Unsure of his ability and calling, and lonely, he became depressed. By late March 1952, plans were made for his return to Trinidad in the summer. His father put down a quarter of the passage. However, in early April, in the vacs before the Trinity term, Naipaul took an impulsive trip to Spain, and quickly spent all he had saved. Attempting an explanation to his family, he called it "a nervous breakdown". Thirty years later, he was to call it "something like a mental illness."

Earlier in 1952, at a college play, Naipaul had met Patricia Ann Hale, a history student. Hale and Naipaul formed a close friendship, which eventually developed into a sexual relationship. With Hale's support, Naipaul began to recover and gradually to write. In turn, she became a partner in planning his career. When they told their families about their relationship, the response was unenthusiastic; from her family it was hostile. In June 1953, both Naipaul and Hale graduated, both receiving, in his words, "a damn, bloody, ... second." J. R. R. Tolkien, professor of Anglo-Saxon at Oxford, however, judged Naipaul's Anglo-Saxon paper to have been the best in the university.

In Trinidad, Naipaul's father had had a coronary thrombosis in early 1953, and lost his job at the Guardian in the summer. In October 1953, Seepersad Naipaul died. By Hindu tenets, it fell to Naipaul to light the funeral pyre—it was the mandatory ritual of the eldest son. But since there was not the time nor the money for Naipaul to return, his eight-year-old brother, Shiva Naipaul, performed the final rites of cremation. "The event marked him," Naipaul wrote about his brother. "That death and cremation were his private wound."

Through the summer and autumn of 1953, Naipaul was financially depleted. His prospects for employment in frugal post-war Britain were unpromising, his applications to jobs overseas repeatedly rejected, and his attempts at writing as yet haphazard. Working off and on at odd jobs, borrowing money from Pat or his family in Trinidad, Naipaul reluctantly enrolled for a B. Litt. post-graduate degree at Oxford in English Literature. In December 1953, he failed his first B.Litt. exam. Although he passed the second written examination, his viva voce, in February 1954, with F. P. Wilson, an Elizabethan scholar and Merton Professor of English Literature at Oxford, did not go well. He was failed overall for the B.Litt. degree. (Note: According to Naipaul's authorised biographer Patrick French, Wilson was "a retired professor ... who was renowned for being taciturn and socially awkward." and that Naipaul blamed Wilson for failing him—in Naipaul's words—"deliberately and out of racial feeling." However, according to Wilson's ODNB biographers, Wilson retired later, in 1957, and was, "a master of social graces and a witty conversationalist.") With that also ended all hopes of being supported for academic studies at Oxford. Naipaul would later say that he 'hated Oxford'.

=== 1954–1956: London, Caribbean Voices, marriage ===
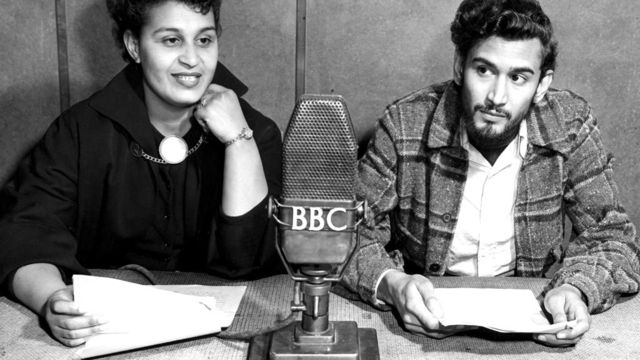
Pauline Henriques and Samuel Selvon reading a story on BBC's Caribbean Voices. In December 1954, Naipaul joined the staff.

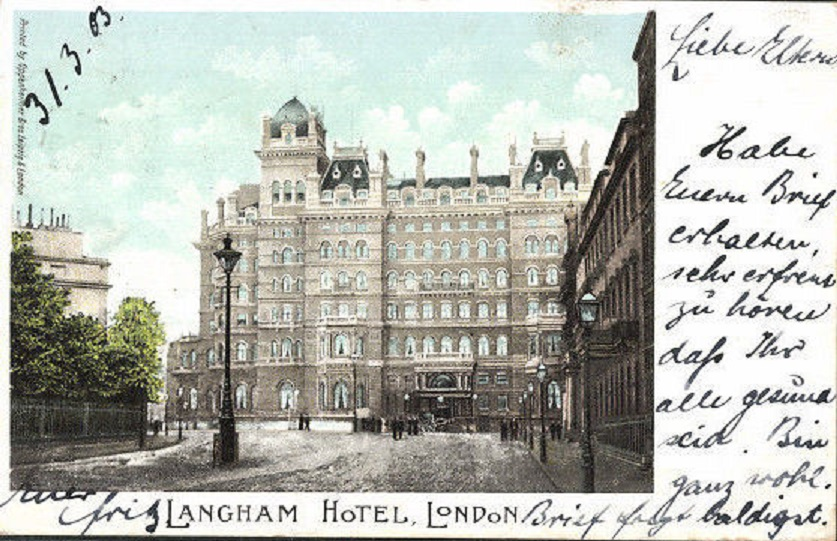
The old Langham Hotel in a picture-postcard ca. 1903. Here, in 1955 in the BBC freelancers' room, Naipaul wrote the first story of Miguel Street.

"The freelancers' room was like a club: chat, movement, the separate anxieties of young or youngish men below the passing fellowship of the room. That was the atmosphere I was writing in. That was the atmosphere I gave to Bogart's Port of Spain street. Partly for the sake of speed, and partly because my memory or imagination couldn't rise to it, I had given his servant room hardly any furniture: the Langham room itself was barely furnished. And I benefited from the fellowship of the room that afternoon. Without that fellowship, without the response of the three men who read the story, I might not have wanted to go on with what I had begun."

— From, "A Prologue to an Autobiography" (1983).

Naipaul moved to London, where he reluctantly accepted shelter in the flat of a cousin. Pat, who had won a scholarship for further studies at the University of Birmingham, moved out of her parents' flat to independent lodgings where Naipaul could visit her. For the remainder of 1954, Naipaul exhibited behaviour that tried the patience of those closest to him. He denounced Trinidad and Trinidadians; he castigated the British who he felt had taken him out of Trinidad but left him without opportunity; he took refuge in illness, but when help was offered, he rebuffed it. He was increasingly dependent on Pat, who remained loyal, offering him money, practical advice, encouragement, and rebuke.

Gainful employment appeared for Naipaul in December 1954. Henry Swanzy, producer of the BBC weekly programme, Caribbean Voices, offered Naipaul a three-month renewable contract as presenter of the programme. Swanzy, on whose program a generation of Caribbean writers had debuted, including George Lamming, Samuel Selvon, the 19-year-old Derek Walcott and, earlier, Naipaul himself, was being transferred to Accra to manage the Gold Coast Broadcasting System. Naipaul would stay in the part-time job for four years, and Pat would remain the critical breadwinner for the couple.

In January 1955, Naipaul moved to new lodgings, a small flat in Kilburn, and he and Pat were married. Neither informed their families or friends—their wedding guests were limited to the two witnesses required by law. Pat continued to live in Birmingham but visited on the weekends. At the BBC, Naipaul presented the programme once a week, wrote short reviews and conducted interviews. The sparsely furnished freelancers' room in the old Langham Hotel flowed with the banter of Caribbean writers and would-be writers, providing camaraderie and fellowship. There, one afternoon in the summer of 1955, Naipaul typed out a 3,000-word story. It was based on the memory of a neighbour he had known as a child in a Port of Spain street, but it also drew on the mood and ambience of the freelancers' room. Three fellow writers, John Stockbridge, Andrew Salkey, and Gordon Woolford, who read the story later, were affected by it and encouraged him to go on. Over the next five weeks, Naipaul would write his first publishable book, Miguel Street, a collection of linked stories of that Port of Spain street. Although the book was not published right away, Naipaul's talent caught the attention of publishers and his spirits began to lift.

=== 1956–1958: Early Trinidad novels ===
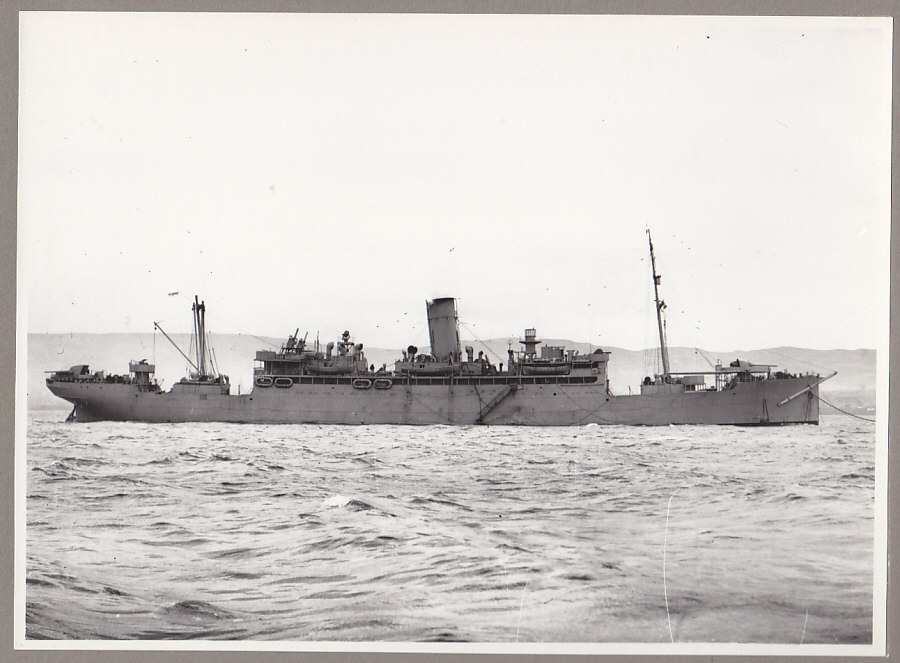
HMS Cavina, the peacetime Elders & Fyffes passenger-carrying banana boat, shown in 1941, requisitioned for World War II. In August 1956, Naipaul returned on TSS Cavina to Trinidad for a two-month stay with his family.

Diana Athill, the editor at the publishing company André Deutsch, who read Miguel Street, liked it. But the publisher, André Deutsch, thought a series of linked stories by an unknown Caribbean writer unlikely to sell profitably in Britain. He encouraged Naipaul to write a novel. Without enthusiasm, Naipaul quickly wrote The Mystic Masseur in autumn 1955. On 8 December 1955, his novel was accepted by Deutsch, and Naipaul received a £125 payment.

In late August 1956, six years after arriving in England, three years after his father's death, and in the face of pressure from his family in Trinidad, especially his mother, to visit, Naipaul boarded TSS Cavina, an Elders & Fyffes passenger-carrying banana boat, in Bristol. From on board the ship, he sent harsh and humorous descriptions of the ship's West Indians passengers to Pat, recording also their conversations in dialect. His early letters from Trinidad spoke to the wealth created there during the intervening years, in contrast to the prevailing frugal economy in Britain. Trinidad was in its last phase before decolonisation, and there was a new-found confidence among its citizens. Among Trinidad's different racial groups, there were also avowals of racial separateness—in contrast to the fluid, open racial attitudes of Naipaul's childhood—and there was violence. In the elections of 1956, the party supported by the majority blacks and Indian Muslims narrowly won, leading to an increased sense of gloom in Naipaul. Naipaul accompanied a politician uncle, a candidate of the Hindu party, to his campaign rallies. During these and other events he was gathering ideas for later literary use. By the time he left Trinidad, he had written to Pat about plans for a new novelette on a rural election in Trinidad. These would transmute upon his return to England into the comic novel The Suffrage of Elvira.

Back in England, Deutsch informed Naipaul that The Mystic Masseur would not be published for another ten months. Naipaul's anger at the publisher together with his anxiety about surviving as a writer aroused more creative energy: The Suffrage of Elvira was written with great speed during the early months of 1957. In June 1957, The Mystic Masseur was finally published. The reviews were generally complimentary, though some were also patronising. Still shy of his 25th birthday, Naipaul copied out many of the reviews by hand for his mother, including the Daily Telegraph's, "V. S. Naipaul is a young writer who contrives to blend Oxford wit with home-grown rambunctiousness and not do harm to either." Awaiting his book royalties, in summer 1957, Naipaul accepted his only full-time employment, the position of editorial assistant at the Cement and Concrete Association (C&CA). The association published the magazine Concrete Quarterly. Although he disliked the desk job and remained in it for a mere ten weeks, the salary of £1,000 a year provided financial stability, allowing him to send money to Trinidad. The C&CA was also to be the office setting for Naipaul's later novel, Mr Stone and the Knights Companion. Around this same time, writer Francis Wyndham, who had taken Naipaul under his wing, introduced him to novelist Anthony Powell. Powell, in turn, convinced the publisher of the New Statesman, Kingsley Martin, to give Naipaul a part-time job reviewing books. Naipaul would review books once a month from 1957 to 1961.

With many West Indian writers now active in England, Caribbean Voices was judged to have achieved its purpose and slated to terminate in August 1958. Naipaul's relations with his BBC employers began to fray. Despite three years of hosting the programme and three completed novels, he had been unable to make the transition to mainstream BBC programming. He claimed later that he was told those jobs were reserved for Europeans. In July 1958, after arriving late for a program, Naipaul was reprimanded by the producers, and, in his words, "broke with the BBC".

With promotional help from André Deutsch, Naipaul's novels would soon receive critical acclaim. The Mystic Masseur was awarded the John Llewellyn Rhys Prize in 1958, and Miguel Street the Somerset Maugham Award in 1961, W. Somerset Maugham himself approving the first-ever selection of a non-European.

=== 1957–1960: A House for Mr Biswas ===
Seepersad Naipaul, father of V. S. Naipaul, and the inspiration for the protagonist of the novel, Mr Biswas, with his Ford Prefect

Not long after Naipaul began writing A House for Mr Biswas, he and Pat moved across town from their attic flat in Muswell Hill to an upstairs flat in Streatham Hill. It was the first home in which they felt comfortable. In his foreword to the 1983 Alfred A. Knopf edition of the book, Naipaul was to write:

"I had more than changed flats: for the first time in my life I enjoyed solitude and freedom in a house. And just as, in the novel, I was able to let myself go, so in the solitude of the quiet, friendly house in Streatham Hill I could let myself go. ... The two years spent on this novel in Streatham Hill remain the most consuming, the most fulfilled, the happiest years of my life. They were my Eden."

The book is an imagined version of his father's life as fashioned from childhood memories. The story as it evolved became so real for Naipaul, that he later claimed it had "destroyed memory" in some respects. The protagonist, Mohun Biswas, referred to throughout the book as Mr Biswas, is propelled by the forces of circumstance into a succession of vocations: apprentice to a Hindu priest; a signboard painter; a grocery store proprietor in the "heart of the sugarcane area"; a driver, or "sub-overseer," in a dark, damp and overgrown estate; and a reporter for The Trinidad Sentinel. What ambition or resourcefulness Mr Biswas possesses is inevitably undermined by his dependence on his powerful in-laws and the vagaries of opportunity in a colonial society. His in-laws, the Tulsis, with whom he lives much of the time, are a large extended family, and are caricatured with great humour, and some unkindness, in the novel. There is a melancholic streak in Mr Biswas which makes him at times both purposeless and clumsy, but it also stirs flashes of anger and of sniping wit. Humour underpins the many tense relationships in the book. Eventually, as times change, as two of his children go abroad for college, and as ill health overcomes him, he buys a house, with money borrowed from a friend, and moves into it with his wife and remaining children, and in small measure strikes out on his own before he dies at age 46. According to the author Patrick French, A House for Mr Biswas is "universal in the way that the work of Dickens or Tolstoy is universal; the book makes no apologies for itself, and does not contextualize or exoticize its characters. It reveals a complete world."

The writing of the book consumed Naipaul. In 1983, he would write:

The book took three years to write. It felt like a career; and there was a short period, towards the end of the writing, when I do believe I knew all or much of the book by heart. The labour ended; the book began to recede. And I found that I was unwilling to re-enter the world I had created, unwilling to expose myself again to the emotions that lay below the comedy. I became nervous of the book. I haven't read it since I passed the proofs in May 1961.

The reviews of the book both in the British press and the Caribbean were generous. In The Observer, Colin McInnes wrote that the book had the "unforced pace of a masterpiece: it is relaxed, yet on every page alert". Francis Wyndham, writing in the London Magazine, suggested that the book was "one of the clearest and subtlest illustrations ever shown of the effects of colonialism ...." In his Trinidad Guardian review, Derek Walcott, judged Naipaul to be "one of the most mature of West Indian writers".

In 2011, on the fiftieth anniversary of the publication of A House for Mr Biswas, and ten years after Naipaul had won the Nobel Prize in Literature, he dedicated the book to his late wife Patricia Anne Hale, who had died in 1996.

=== 1961–1963: The Middle Passage, India, An Area of Darkness ===
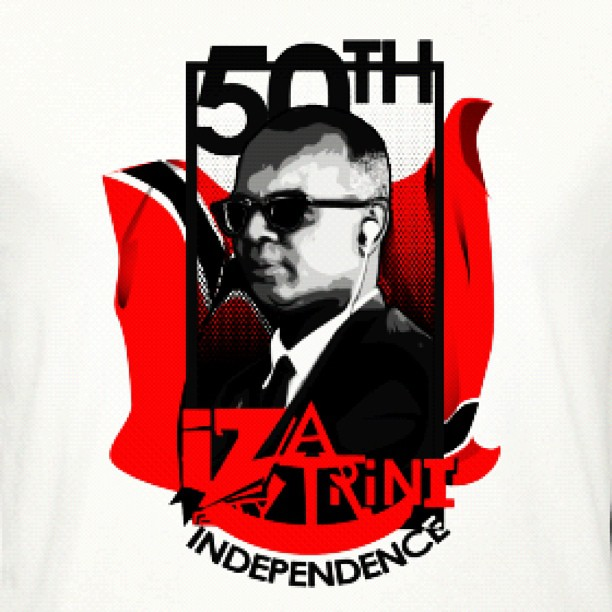
Eric Williams, the Premier of Trinidad and Tobago, invited Naipaul to visit in early 1961 and to write a book on Caribbean history, published as The Middle Passage.

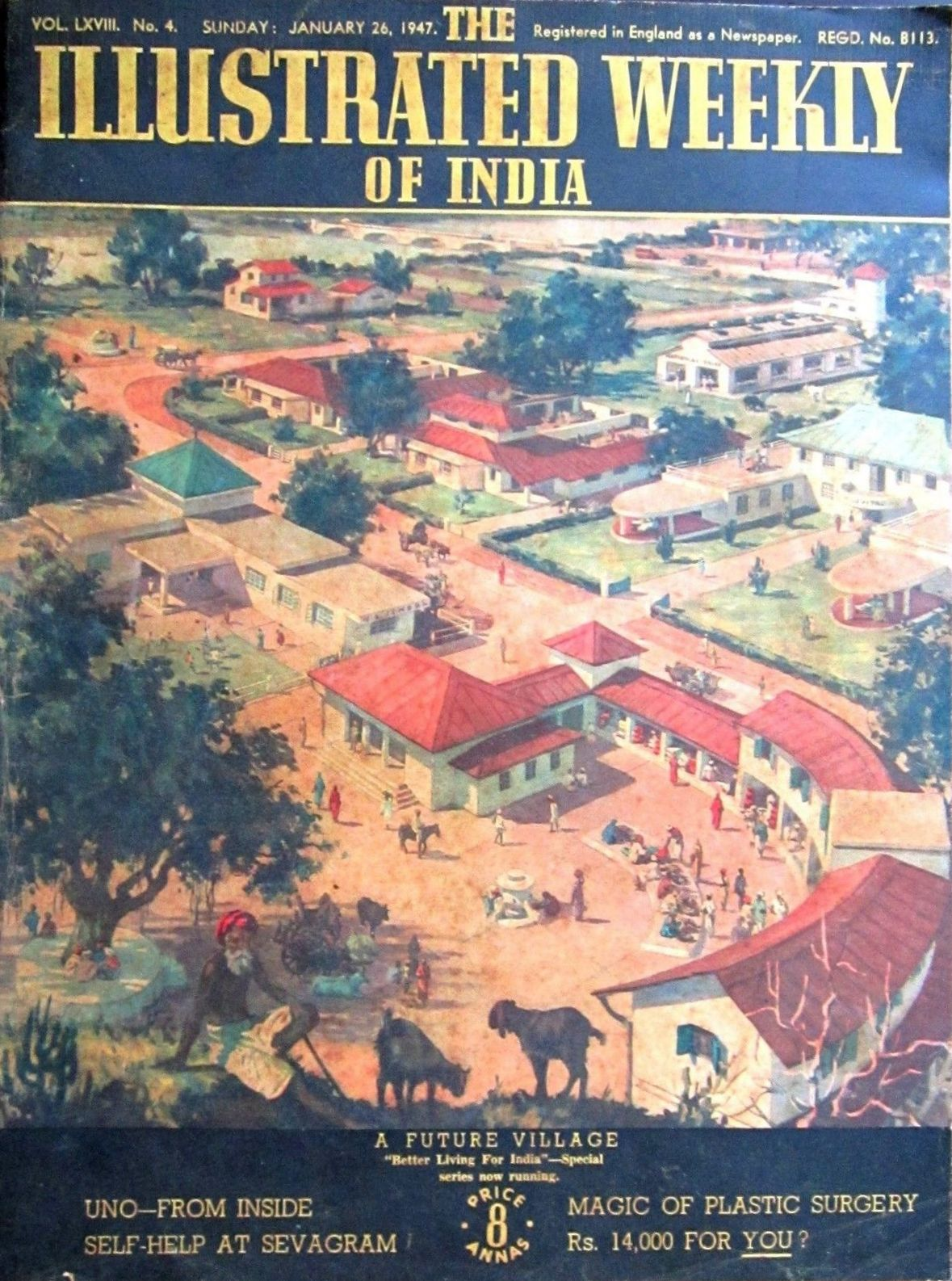
Naipaul wrote a monthly "Letter from London" for the Illustrated Weekly of India from 1963 to 1965.

In September 1960, Naipaul was sounded out about visiting Trinidad as a guest of the government and giving a few lectures. The following month an invitation arrived offering an all-expenses-paid trip and a stipend. Naipaul and Pat, both exhausted after the completion of A House for Mr Biswas, spent the next five months in the Caribbean. In Port of Spain, Naipaul was invited by Eric Williams, Premier of Trinidad and Tobago within the short-lived West Indies Federation, to visit other countries of the region and write a book on the Caribbean. The Middle Passage: Impressions of Five Societies – British, French and Dutch in the West Indies and South America, Naipaul's first work of travel writing, was the result. To gather material for the book, Naipaul and Pat travelled to British Guiana, Suriname, Martinique and Jamaica.

The book begins with perceptive, lively, but unflattering and gratuitously descriptive portraits of fellow passengers bound for Trinidad. Although he was later criticised for the insensitiveness of these descriptions, he stood by his book, claiming it was "a very funny book", and that he was employing a form of irreverent West Indian humour. Naipaul does not attempt to be detached in the book, continually reminding the reader of his own ties to the region. For him, the West Indies are islands colonised only for the purpose of employing slaves for the production of other people's goods; he states, "The history of the islands can never be told satisfactorily. Brutality is not the only difficulty. History is built around achievement and creation; and nothing was created in the West Indies." As the narrative progresses, Naipaul becomes more sympathetic and insightful, noting that no African names remain on the islands; that slavery had engendered "self-contempt," impelling the descendants of the slaves to idealise European civilisation and to look down on all others; and that the debasement of identity has created racial animosity and rivalry among the brutalised peoples. As Naipaul does not see nationalism as having taken root in these societies, only cults of personality, he does not celebrate the coming of independence, though he does not suggest a return to colonial subjecthood.

In early 1962, Naipaul and Pat arrived in India for a year-long visit. It was Naipaul's first visit to the land of his ancestors. The title of the resulting book, An Area of Darkness, was not so much a reference to India as to Naipaul's effort to understand India. Soon after arrival, Naipaul was overwhelmed by two sensations. First, for the first time in his life, he felt anonymous, even faceless. He was no longer identified, he felt, as part of a special ethnic group as he had been in Trinidad or England and this made him anxious. Second, he was upset by what he saw was the resigned or evasive Indian reaction to poverty and suffering. After a month in Bombay and Delhi, Naipaul and Pat spent five months in Jammu and Kashmir, staying in the lakeside Hotel Liward in Srinagar. Here, Naipaul wrote a novella, Mr Stone and the Knights Companion, set in London, and based, in part, on his experiences working for the Cement and Concrete Association, and, in part, on his relationship with Pat. He wrote a number of short stories which were eventually published in the collection A Flag on the Island. His evolving relationship with the hotel manager, Mr. Butt, and especially his assistant, Mr. Aziz, became the subject of the middle section of An Area of Darkness, Naipaul bringing his novelistic skills and economy of style to bear with good effect. During the rest of his stay, his frustration with some aspects of India mounted even as he felt an attraction to other aspects. Gorakhpur, in eastern Uttar Pradesh, he wrote later, had "reduced him to the early-Indian stage of (his) hysteria". During his visit to his ancestral village, soon afterwards, Naipaul impatiently turned down a request for assistance and made a quick escape. But in a letter, he also wrote: "As you can imagine I fell in love with these beautiful people, their so beautiful women who have all the boldness and independence ... of Brahmin women ... and their enchanting fairy-tale village."

Just before he left India, Naipaul was invited by the editor of the Illustrated Weekly of India, a prominent, established, English-language magazine, to write a monthly "Letter from London" for the magazine. Naipaul accepted for a fee of £30 a letter. He wrote a monthly letter for the next two years. It would be the only time he would write regularly on the contemporary culture in England, his country of domicile. The topics included cricket, The Beatles, the Profumo affair, advertising in the London Tube, and the Queen.

=== 1964–1967: A Flag on the Island, Africa, The Mimic Men ===
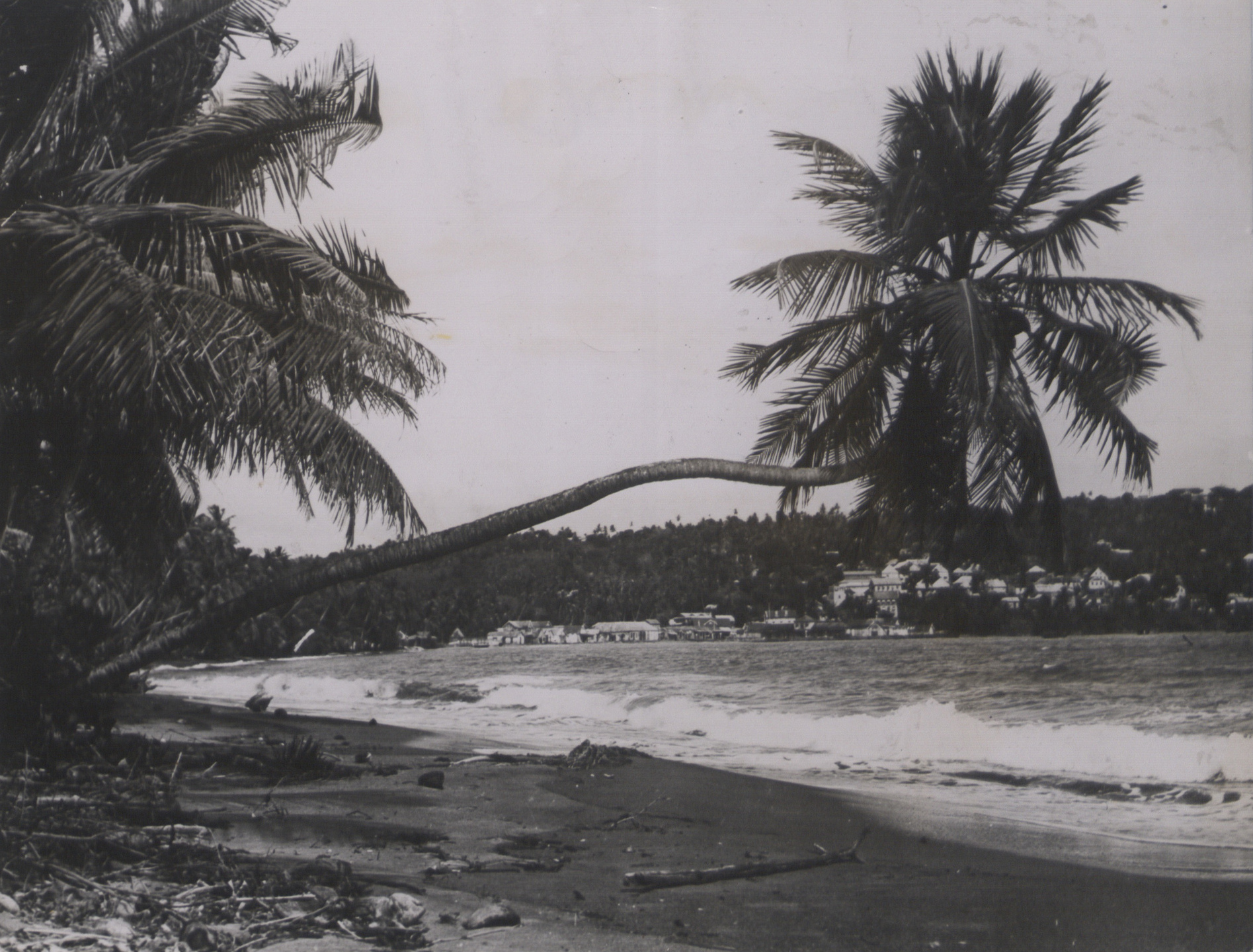
A beach near Scarborough, Tobago, similar to the one on the fictional island of Isabella in The Mimic Men.

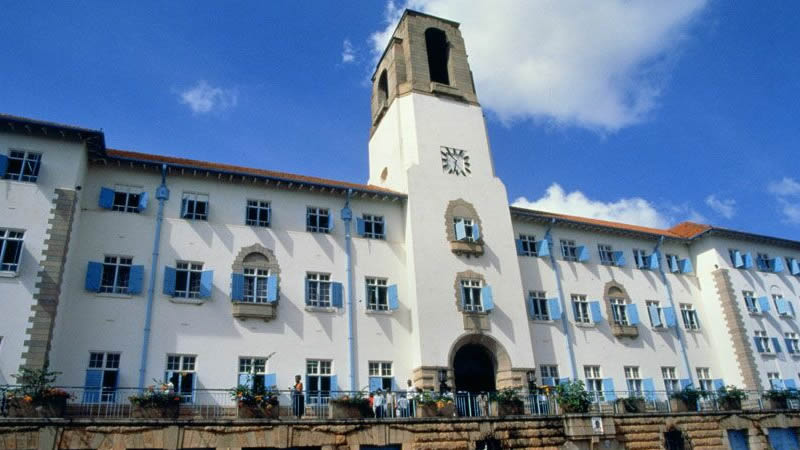
Naipaul served as writer-in-residence at Makerere University in Kampala, Uganda, and finished his novel The Mimic Men

"Coconut trees and beach and the white of breakers seemed to meet at a point in the distance. It was not possible to see where coconut turned to mangrove and swampland. Here and there, interrupting the straight line of the beach, were the trunks of trees washed up by the sea. I set myself to walk to one tree, then to the other. I was soon far away from the village and from people, and was alone on the beach, smooth and shining silver in the dying light. No coconut now, but mangrove, tall on the black cages of their roots. From the mangrove swamps channels ran to the ocean between sand banks that were daily made and broken off, as neatly as if cut by machines, shallow channels of clear water touched with the amber of dead leaves, cool to the feet, different from the warm sea."

— From, The Mimic Men (1967).

Naipaul had spent an overwrought year in India. Back in London, after An Area of Darkness was completed, he felt creatively drained. He felt he had used up his Trinidad material. Neither India nor the writing of Mr Stone and the Knights Companion, his only attempt at a novel set in Britain with white British characters, had spurred new ideas for imaginative writing. His finances too were low, and Pat went back to teaching to supplement them. Naipaul's books had received much critical acclaim, but they were not yet money makers. Socially, he was now breaking away from the Caribbean Voices circle, but no doors had opened to mainstream British society.

That changed when Naipaul was introduced to Antonia Fraser, at the time the wife of conservative politician Hugh Fraser. Fraser introduced Naipaul to her social circle of upper-class British politicians, writers, and performing artists. In this circle was the wealthy second Baron Glenconner, father of novelist Emma Tennant and owner of estates in Trinidad, who arranged for an unsecured loan of £7,200 for Naipaul. Naipaul and Pat bought a three-floor house on Stockwell Park Crescent.

In late 1964, Naipaul was asked to write an original script for an American movie. He spent the next few months in Trinidad writing the story, a novella named, "A Flag on the Island," later published in the collection, A Flag on the Island. The finished version was not to the director's liking and the movie was never made. The story is set in the present time—1964—in a Caribbean island, which is not named. The main character is an American named "Frankie" who affects the mannerisms of Frank Sinatra. Frankie has links to the island from having served there during World War II. He revisits reluctantly when his ship anchors there during a hurricane. Naipaul wilfully makes the pace of the book feverish, the narrative haphazard, the characters loud, the protagonist fickle or deceptive, and the dialogue confusing. Balancing the present time is Frankie's less disordered, though comfortless, memory of 20 years before. Then he had become a part of a community on the island. He had tried to help his poor friends by giving away the ample US Army supplies he had. Not everyone was happy about receiving help and not everyone benefited. Frankie was left chastened about finding tidy solutions to the island's social problems. This theme, indirectly developed in the story, is one to which Naipaul would return.

Not long after finishing A Flag on the Island, Naipaul began work on the novel The Mimic Men, though for almost a year he did not make significant progress. At the end of this period, he was offered a Writer-in-Residence fellowship at Makerere University in Kampala, Uganda. There, in early 1966, Naipaul began to rewrite his material and went on to complete the novel quickly. The finished novel broke new ground for him. Unlike his Caribbean work, it was not comic. It did not unfold chronologically. Its language was allusive and ironic, its overall structure whimsical. It had strands of both fiction and non-fiction, a precursor of other Naipaul novels. It was intermittently dense, even obscure, but it also had beautiful passages, especially descriptive ones of the fictional tropical island of Isabella. The subject of sex appeared explicitly for the first time in Naipaul's work. The plot, to the extent there is one, is centred around a protagonist, Ralph Singh, an East Indian-West Indian politician from Isabella. Singh is in exile in London and attempting to write his political memoirs. Earlier, in the immediate aftermath of decolonisation in a number of British colonies in the late 1950s and early 1960s, Singh had shared political power with a more powerful African Caribbean politician. Soon, the memoirs take on a more personal aspect. There are flashbacks to the formative and defining periods of Singh's life. In many of these, during crucial moments, whether during his childhood, married life, or political career, he appears to abandon engagement and enterprise. These, he rationalises later, belong only to fully made European societies. When The Mimic Men was published, it received generally positive critical notice. In particular, Caribbean politicians, such as Michael Manley and Eric Williams weighed in, the latter writing, "V. S. Naipaul's description of West Indians as 'mimic men' is harsh but true ..."

=== 1968–1972: The Loss of El Dorado, In A Free State ===
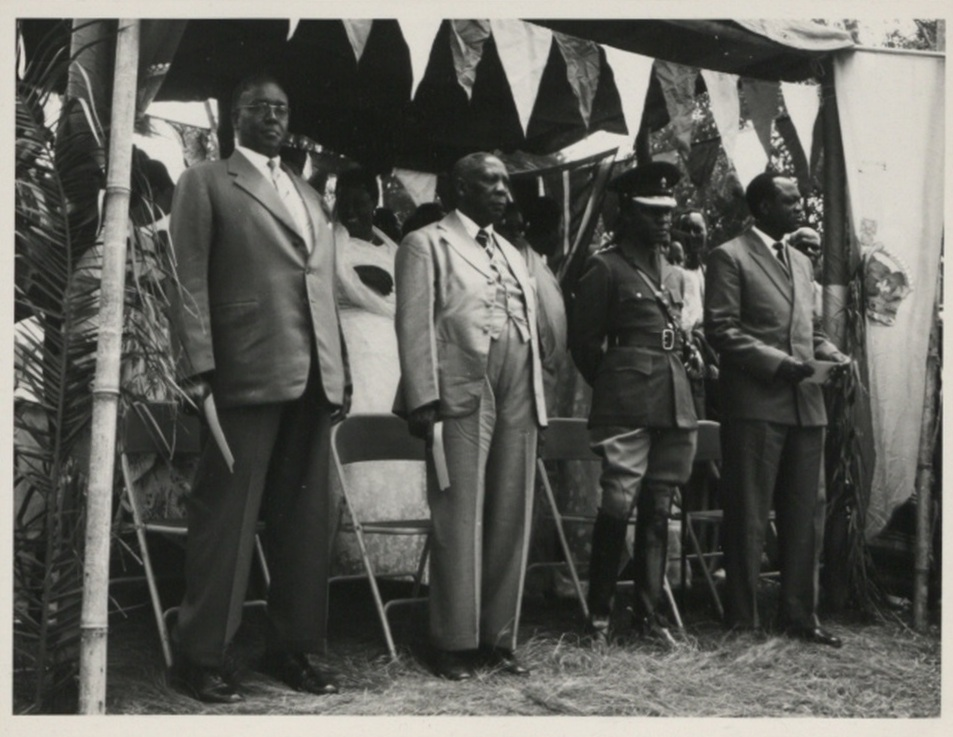
Four kings of Ugandan kingdoms, from left to right: The Omugabe of Ankole, Omukama of Bunyoro, the Kabaka of Buganda, and the Won Nyaci of Lango, at the signing of an agreement in Kabarole, Toro, Uganda, between the British governor, Sir Frederick Crawford and the Omukama of Toro.

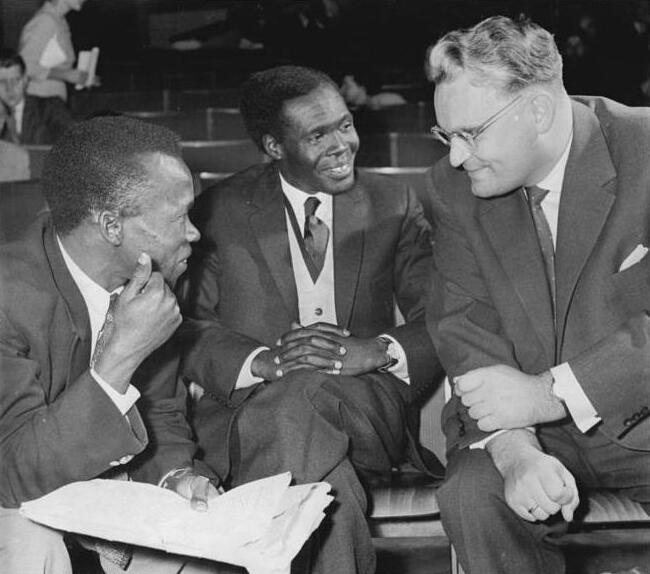
At "Kenya Day," Leipzig, 1960, Milton Obote, centre, later PM of Uganda, demanded the release of Jomo Kenyatta, the Kenyan nationalist. In 1966 and 1967, Obote would depose all the Ugandan kings, including the Kabaka of Buganda.

Back in London in October 1966, Naipaul received an invitation from the American publisher Little, Brown and Company to write a book on Port of Spain. The book took two years to write, its scope widening with time. The Loss of El Dorado eventually became a narrative history of Trinidad based on primary sources. Pat spent many months in the archives of the British Library reading those sources. In the end, the finished product was not to the liking of Little, Brown, which was expecting a guidebook. Alfred A. Knopf agreed to publish it instead in the United States as did Andre Deutsch later in Britain.

The Loss of El Dorado is an attempt to ferret out an older, deeper, history of Trinidad, one preceding its commonly taught history as a British-run plantation economy of slaves and indentured workers. Central to Naipaul's history are two stories: the search for El Dorado, a Spanish obsession, in turn pursued by the British, and the British attempt to spark from their new colony of Trinidad, even as it was itself becoming mired in slavery, a revolution of lofty ideals in South America. Sir Walter Raleigh and Francisco Miranda would become the human faces of these stories. Although slavery is eventually abolished, the sought-for social order slips away in the face of uncertainties created by changeable populations, languages, and governments and by the cruelties inflicted by the island's inhabitants on each other.

Before Naipaul began writing The Loss of El Dorado, he had been unhappy with the political climate in Britain. He had been especially unhappy with the increasing public animosity, in the mid-1960s, towards Asian immigrants from Britain's ex-colonies. During the writing of the book, he and Pat sold their house in London, and led a transient life, successively renting or borrowing use of the homes of friends. After the book was completed, they travelled to Trinidad and Canada with a view to finding a location in which to settle. Naipaul had hoped to write a blockbuster, one relieving him of future money anxieties. As it turned out, The Loss of El Dorado sold only 3,000 copies in the US, where major sales were expected; Naipaul also missed England more than he had calculated. It was thus in a depleted state, both financial and emotional, that he returned to Britain.

Earlier, during their time in Africa, Naipaul and Pat had travelled to Kenya, staying for a month in Mombasa on the Indian Ocean coast. They had travelled in rural Uganda to Kisoro District on the south-western border with Rwanda and the Congo. Naipaul showed interest in the clans of the Bagandan people. When Uganda's prime minister Milton Obote overthrew their ruler, the Kabaka of Buganda, Naipaul was critical of the British press for not condemning the action enough. Naipaul also travelled to Tanzania with a young American he had met in Kampala, Paul Theroux. It was upon this African experience that Naipaul would draw during the writing of his next book, In a Free State.

In the title novella, 'In a Free State', at the heart of the book, two young expatriate Europeans drive across an African country, which remains nameless, but offers clues about Uganda, Kenya, and Rwanda. The novella speaks to many themes. The colonial era ends and Africans govern themselves. Political chaos, frequently violent, takes hold in newly decolonised countries. Young, idealistic, expatriate whites are attracted to these countries, seeking expanded moral and sexual freedoms. They are rootless, their bonds with the land tenuous; at the slightest danger they leave. The older, conservative, white settlers, by contrast, are committed to staying, even in the face of danger. The young expatriates, though liberal, can be racially prejudiced. The old settlers, unsentimental, and sometimes brutal, can show compassion. The young, engrossed in narrow preoccupations, are uncomprehending of the dangers that surround them. The old are knowledgeable, armed, and ready to defend themselves. The events unfolding along the car trip and the conversation during it become the means of exploring these themes.

=== 1972–1976: Trinidad killings, Argentina, Guerrillas ===
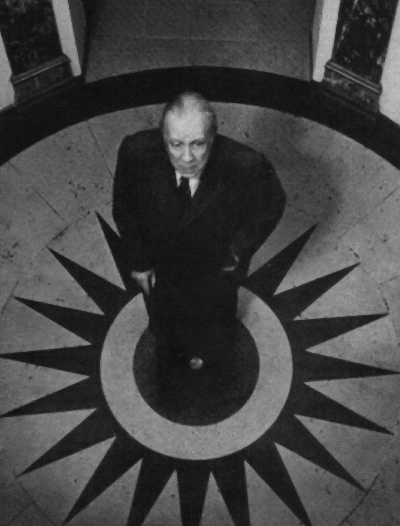
Naipaul met Argentine author Jorge Luis Borges in Buenos Aires in 1972, and wrote critically of Borges in the New York Review of Books. Here Borges is shown three years earlier.

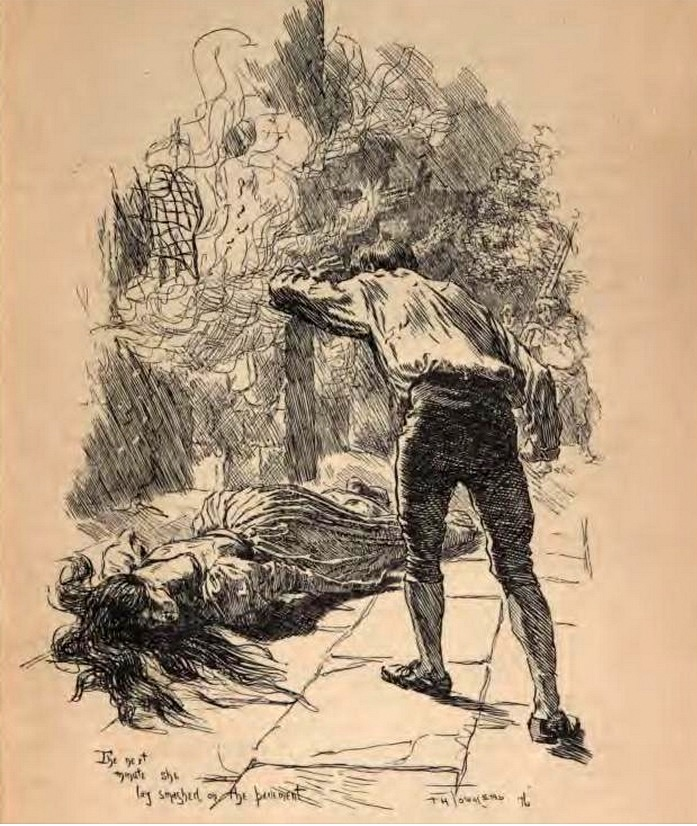
Jane and Roche in Guerrillas also evoke the title character in Jane Eyre and her employer Rochester, whose deranged West Indian wife dies at the end of the novel while attempting to set fire to their house.

The short life and career of Michael de Freitas, a Trinidadian immigrant in the London underworld of the late 1960s, who returned to Trinidad in the early 1970s as a Black Power activist, Michael X, exemplified the themes Naipaul had developed in The Mimic Men and In a Free State.

In late December 1971 as news of the killings at Michael X's commune in Arima filtered out, Naipaul, accompanied by Pat, arrived in Trinidad to cover the story. This was a time of strains in their marriage. Naipaul, although dependent on Pat, was frequenting prostitutes for sexual gratification. Pat was alone. Intensifying their disaffection was Pat's childlessness, for which neither Pat nor Naipaul sought professional treatment, preferring instead to say that fatherhood would not allow time for Naipaul's sustained literary labours. Naipaul was increasingly ill-humoured and infantile, and Pat increasingly reduced to mothering him. Pat began to keep a diary, a practice she would continue for the next 25 years. According to biographer Patrick French,

"Pat's diary is an essential, unparalleled record of V. S. Naipaul's later life and work, and reveals more about the creation of his subsequent books, and her role in their creation, than any other source. It puts Patricia Naipaul on a par with other great, tragic, literary spouses such as Sonia Tolstoy, Jane Carlyle and Leonard Woolf."

Naipaul visited the commune in Arima and Pat attended the trial. Naipaul's old friend Wyndham Lewis, who was now editor of the Sunday Times, offered to run the story in his newspaper. Around the same time, Naipaul received an invitation from Robert B. Silvers, editor of the New York Review of Books to do some stories on Argentina. The Review, still in its first decade, was short of funds and Silvers had to borrow money to fund Naipaul's trip.

In 1973, Naipaul was nominated for the Nobel Prize in Literature by Artur Lundkvist of the Swedish Academy's Nobel committee.

=== Later works ===
In 1974, Naipaul wrote the novel Guerrillas, following a creative slump that lasted several years. His editor at André Deutsch, Diana Athill, made minor suggestions for improving the book, which led Naipaul to leave the publishing house. He returned a few weeks later. A Bend in the River, published in 1979, marks the beginning of his exploration of native historical traditions, deviating from his usual "New World" examinations. Naipaul also covered the 1984 Republican National Convention in Dallas, Texas, at the behest of Robert B. Silvers, editor of The New York Review of Books, after which Naipaul wrote "Among the Republicans", an anthropological study of a "white tribe in the United States".

In 1987, The Enigma of Arrival, a novel in five sections, was published.

In his 1998 non-fiction book Beyond Belief: Islamic Excursions Among the Converted Peoples, Naipaul argued that Islam is a form of Arab imperialism that destroys other cultures.

Naipaul continued to write non-fiction works, his last being The Masque of Africa: Glimpses of African Belief (2010), written following his trips to Africa in 2008–09. The book explores indigenous religious beliefs and rituals, where Naipaul portrays the countries he visited in real life as bleak, and the people primitive.

=== Personal life ===
During his first trip to Argentina, in 1972, Naipaul met and began an affair with Margaret Murray Gooding, a married Anglo-Argentine mother of three. He revealed his affair to his wife one year after it began, telling her that he had never been sexually satisfied in their relationship. In Patrick French's biography, Naipaul recounts his domestic abuse towards Margaret: "I was very violent with her for two days with my hand ... She thought of it in terms of my passion for her ... My hand was swollen." French writes that the "cruelty [for Naipaul] was part of the attraction". He moved between both women for the next 24 years.

In 1995, as he was travelling through Indonesia with Gooding, his wife Patricia was hospitalised with cancer. She died the following year. Within two months of her death, Naipaul ended his affair with Gooding and married Nadira Alvi, a divorced Pakistani journalist more than 20 years his junior. He had met her at the home of the American consul-general in Lahore. In 2003, he adopted Nadira's daughter, Maleeha, who was then 25.

Naipaul's brother, Shiva Naipaul, was a novelist and journalist. Shiva died in 1985 at the age of 40.

Naipaul died at his home in London on 11 August 2018. Before dying he read and discussed Lord Tennyson's poem Crossing the Bar with those at his bedside. His funeral took place at Kensal Green Cemetery.

== Reception ==
In awarding Naipaul the 2001 Nobel Prize in Literature, the Swedish Academy praised his work "for having united perceptive narrative and incorruptible scrutiny in works that compel us to see the presence of suppressed histories." The Committee added: "Naipaul is a modern philosophe carrying on the tradition that started originally with Lettres persanes and Candide. In a vigilant style, which has been deservedly admired, he transforms rage into precision and allows events to speak with their inherent irony." The committee also noted Naipaul's affinity with the novelist Joseph Conrad:

Naipaul is Conrad's heir as the annalist of the destinies of empires in the moral sense: what they do to human beings. His authority as a narrator is grounded in the memory of what others have forgotten, the history of the vanquished.

Naipaul's fiction and especially his travel writing have been criticised for their allegedly unsympathetic portrayal of the Third World. The novelist Robert Harris has called Naipaul's portrayal of Africa "racist" and "repulsive", reminiscent of Oswald Mosley's fascism. Edward Said argued that Naipaul "allowed himself quite consciously to be turned into a witness for the Western prosecution", promoting what Said classified as "colonial mythologies about wogs and darkies". Said believed that Naipaul's worldview may be most salient in his book-length essay The Middle Passage (1962), composed following Naipaul's return to the Caribbean after 10 years of exile in England, and the work An Area of Darkness (1964).

Naipaul was accused of misogyny, and of having committed acts of "chronic physical abuse" against his mistress of 25 years, Margaret Murray, who wrote in a letter to The New York Review of Books: "Vidia says I didn't mind the abuse. I certainly did mind."

Writing in The New York Review of Books about Naipaul in 1980, Joan Didion offered the following portrayal of the writer:

The actual world has for Naipaul a radiance that diminishes all ideas of it. The pink haze of the bauxite dust on the first page of Guerrillas tells us what we need to know about the history and social organization of the unnamed island on which the action takes place, tells us in one image who runs the island and for whose profit the island is run and at what cost to the life of the island this profit has historically been obtained, but all of this implicit information pales in the presence of the physical fact, the dust itself. ... The world Naipaul sees is of course no void at all: it is a world dense with physical and social phenomena, brutally alive with the complications and contradictions of actual human endeavour. ... This world of Naipaul's is in fact charged with what can only be described as a romantic view of reality, an almost unbearable tension between the idea and the physical fact ...

Nissim Ezekiel wrote the 1984 essay "Naipaul's India and Mine" as a reply to Naipaul's An Area of Darkness.

Fouad Ajami rejected the central thesis of Naipaul's 1998 book Beyond Belief, that Islam is a form of Arab imperialism that destroys other cultures. He pointed to the diversity of Islamic practices across Africa, the Middle East and Asia.

== Awards and recognition ==
Naipaul was awarded the Booker Prize for In a Free State in 1971. He won the Jerusalem Prize in 1983. He was awarded the Trinity Cross in 1990. He was also made a Knight Bachelor in the 1990 New Year Honours. He won the Nobel Prize in Literature in 2001.

== Works ==
=== Fiction ===
- The Mystic Masseur (1957)
- The Suffrage of Elvira (1958)
- Miguel Street (1959)
- A House for Mr Biswas (1961)
- Mr Stone and the Knights Companion (1963)
- The Mimic Men (1967)
- A Flag on the Island (1967)
- In a Free State (1971) – Booker Prize Winner
- Guerrillas (1975)
- A Bend in the River (1979)
- The Enigma of Arrival (1987)
- A Way in the World (1994)
- Half a Life (2001)
- Magic Seeds (2004)

=== Non-fiction ===
- The Middle Passage: Impressions of Five Societies – British, French and Dutch in the West Indies and South America (1962)
- An Area of Darkness (1964)
- The Loss of El Dorado (1969)
- The Overcrowded Barracoon and Other Articles (1972)
- India: A Wounded Civilization (1977)
- A Congo Diary (1980), published by Sylvester & Orphanos
- The Return of Eva Perón and the Killings in Trinidad (1980)
- Among the Believers: An Islamic Journey (1981)
- Finding the Centre: Two Narratives (1984)
- A Turn in the South (1989)
- India: A Million Mutinies Now (1990)
- Beyond Belief: Islamic Excursions among the Converted Peoples (1998)
- Between Father and Son: Family Letters (1999, edited by Gillon Aitken)
- The Writer and the World: Essays (2002)
- A Writer's People: Ways of Looking and Feeling (2007)
- The Masque of Africa: Glimpses of African Belief (2010)
- "Grief: A Writer Reckons with Loss". Personal History. The New Yorker. 95 (43): 18–24. 6 January 2020.

== See also ==
- Capildeo family
- Caribbean literature
- Postcolonial literature
- List of British writers
- List of Indian writers

== Notes and references ==
Notes

Citations

Sources

- Dooley, Gillian (2006). V.S. Naipaul, Man and Writer. University of South Carolina Press. ISBN 978-1-57003-587-6.
- French, Patrick (2008). The World Is What It Is: The Authorized Biography of V. S. Naipaul. New York: Alfred Knopf. ISBN 978-0-307-27035-1.
- Hayward, Helen (2002). The Enigma of V. S. Naipaul. (Warwick University Caribbean Studies). Palgrave Macmillan. ISBN 978-1-4039-0254-2.
- Jussawalla, Feroza F., ed. (1997). Conversations with V. S. Naipaul. Univ. Press of Mississippi. ISBN 978-0-87805-945-4.
- King, Bruce (2003). V.S. Naipaul (2nd ed.). Palgrave Macmillan. ISBN 978-1-4039-0456-0.
- Naipaul, V. S. (1964). An Area of Darkness.
- Naipaul, V. S. (1967). The Mimic Men.
- Naipaul, V. S. (1983a). "Foreword". A House for Mr. Biswas with a new foreword by the author. New York: Alfred Knopf Inc. ISBN 978-0-679-44458-9.
  - Also: Naipaul, V. S. (24 November 1983b). "Writing A House for Mr. Biswas". The New York Review of Books. 30 (18).
  - Also: Naipaul, V. S. (2012). "Foreword to A House of Mr. Biswas". Literary Occasions. Knopf Canada. p. 186. ISBN 978-03-0-737065-5.
  - Also: Naipaul, V. S. (1983c). "A prologue to an autobiography". Vanity Fair.
- Naipaul, V.S. (1987). The Enigma of Arrival. New York: Alfred A. Knopf. ISBN 978-0-307-74403-6.
- Naipaul, V.S. (2007) [2000]. Gillon Aitken (ed.). Between Father and Son: Family Letters. New York: Alfred A. Knopf Inc. ISBN 978-0-307-42497-6.
  - Also: Aitken, Gillon (2007) [2000]. "Introduction". In Gillon Aitken (ed.). Between Father and Son: Family Letters. New York: Alfred A. Knopf Inc. ISBN 978-0-307-42497-6.
- Nixon, Rob (1992). London Calling: V. S. Naipaul, Postcolonial Mandarin. Oxford University Press. ISBN 978-0-19-536196-4.
- Robertson, Jean; Connell, P. J. (2004). "Wilson, Frank Percy (1889–1963)". Oxford Dictionary of National Biography (online ed.). Oxford University Press. doi:10.1093/ref:odnb/36953. (Subscription, Wikipedia Library access or UK public library membership required.)
- Rosen, Jonathan; Tejpal, Tarun, eds. (1998). "V. S. Naipaul, The Art of Fiction No. 154". The Paris Review. Fall 1998 (148).
- Said, Edward W. (2000). "Bitter Dispatches from the Third World". Reflections on Exile and Other Essays. Harvard University Press. p. 98. ISBN 978-0-674-00302-6.
- Visaria, Pravin; Visaria, Leela (1983). "Population (1757–1947)". In Dharma Kumar, Meghnad Desai (ed.). The Cambridge Economic History of India, Volume 2, c.1757–c.1970. Cambridge University Press. ISBN 978-0-521-22802-2.
