= In a Free State =

1971 novel by V. S. Naipaul

- First edition
- Author: V. S. Naipaul
- Language: English
- Publisher: André Deutsch
- Publication date: 1971
- Publication place: United Kingdom
- Media type: Print
- Pages: 256
- ISBN: 0-233-95832-0

In a Free State is a work of fiction by V. S. Naipaul published in 1971 by Andre Deutsch. It won that year's Booker Prize. The plot consists of a framing narrative and three stories – "One out of Many", "Tell Me Who to Kill", and the title story, "In a Free State". The work is symphonic, with different movements converging towards a common theme; although the theme is not spelled out, it evidently concerns the price of freedom, with analogies implicitly drawn among the three scenarios. The story "In a Free State" was later published as a standalone novel under the same title.

== Plot summary ==
The novel begins with a narrator on a ferry to Egypt, and concludes many years later when he returns to Egypt as a tourist.

=== First tale ===
The first tale concerns an Indian servant from Bombay who, having no real alternative at home, accompanies his master on a diplomatic mission to Washington, D.C. The two Indians initially must cope with the poor exchange rate of Indian currency in the United States.

The servant lives in what is virtually a cupboard, and inadvertently blows several weeks' salary just buying a snack. He then meets a restaurant proprietor who offers him an apparent fortune as a salary, so he absconds and works at the restaurant. Once he has his affairs in reasonable order, however, he starts to live in fear that his master will find him and order him back. He also learns that he is working illegally and is liable to deportation.

The only way of resolving the situation is to marry a woman who had seduced him, but whom he had avoided ever since out of shame.

=== Second tale ===
The second story features an extended South Asian family in the rural West Indies, in which one wealthy cousin manages to humiliate another, the narrator. The richer family has a son who goes to Canada and is destined to do well, while the other cousins can expect nothing.

The younger brother of the second family then sets out for England to study engineering, while his elder brother does all he can to support him. Eventually the elder brother follows him to England with the aim of helping him further. He works long hours in demeaning jobs to support his brother's studies, but eventually makes enough money to set up his own business in a restaurant. He subsequently discovers that his brother, despite appearances, is doing no studying at all; his restaurant, meanwhile, becomes frequented by hooligans. In a fit of rage, the narrator ends up murdering one of them, who turns out to be a friend of his brother. The story ends when he attends his brother's wedding, with a carer for company.

=== Third tale ===
The story is set in an African Great Lakes state that has recently acquired independence. The king, although favored by the colonial settlers, is weak and on the run, while the president is poised to take absolute power. Incidents of violence become more frequent in the cities, while there are signs of further violence in the countryside. There are rumors that the nation's Asian community will be "deported."

Bobby is an official who has been attending a conference in the capital city. He now heads back to the governmental compound where he lives; he has offered a lift to Linda, another colleague's wife. We learn early on that Bobby is homosexual. He is rebuffed by a young Zulu when he tries to pick him up at the hotel bar. He soon discovers that Linda has plans of her own as they embark on the journey.

The relationship between the two is complex from the outset; it seems Bobby is intent on aggravating the initially calm Linda. His previous history of mental illness is explored. Things go from bad to worse when they put up at a hotel, run by an old colonel who refuses to adapt to the new conditions of independence. There, they have dinner, and they witness a scene between the colonel and Peter, his servant, whom he accuses of planning his murder. Meanwhile, Bobby discovers that Linda was planning some extra-marital activity with a friend along the way; he becomes furious and hostile.

The two reach their destination, but not before visiting the site where the nation's old king was recently murdered; encountering a philosophical Hindu who is planning to move to Egypt; and observing the beginnings of a genocidal wave of violence. Bobby is beaten by the army at a checkpoint.

The story follows the conventions of the road novel, allowing the reader to become increasingly aware, along with Bobby and Linda, of how serious the situation has become.

== Awards ==
This book won the Booker Prize for 1971. According to the Booker Prize Foundation: "Through five connected tales, V.S. Naipaul explores alienation, disruption and racial tension in a perilously unpredictable world."

== Standalone novel ==
In 2011, V.S. Naipaul decided to publish the central narrative of this work as a standalone novel due to the various changes that he perceived had happened in the world. The book itself is titled "In a Free State."
