= Criticism of multiculturalism =

Criticism of multiculturalism questions the ideal of the hegemonic maintenance of distinct ethnic cultures within a country. Multiculturalism is a particular subject of debate in certain European nations that are associated with the idea of a nation state. Critics of multiculturalism may argue against cultural integration of different ethnic and cultural groups to the existing laws and values of the country. Alternatively critics may argue for assimilation of different ethnic and cultural groups to a single national identity.

== Social trust ==
Harvard professor of political science Robert D. Putnam conducted a nearly decade long study on how diversity affects public trust and social cohesion. In the presence of such ethnic diversity, Putnam maintains that "we hunker down. We act like turtles. The effect of diversity is worse than had been imagined. And it's not just that we don't trust people who are not like us. In diverse communities, we don't trust people who look like us."

== Australia ==
Rifts within Australian society, right through history, whether between the continent's Indigenous people and the European settler population or, in recent times, inter-ethnic tension manifest in the form of riots, street violence and ethnic gangs pose major challenges to multiculturalism in the country.

The response to multiculturalism in Australia has been varied. A nationalist, anti-mass immigration party, the One Nation Party, was formed by Pauline Hanson in the late 1990s. The party enjoyed brief electoral success, most notably in its home state of Queensland, but became electorally marginalized until its resurgence in 2016. In the late 1990s, One Nation called for the abolition of multiculturalism alleging that it represented "a threat to the very basis of the Australian culture, identity and shared values", arguing that there was "no reason why migrant cultures should be maintained at the expense of our shared, national culture."

An Australian Federal Government proposal in 2006 to introduce a compulsory citizenship test, which would assess English skills and knowledge of Australian values, sparked renewed debate over the future of multiculturalism in Australia. Andrew Robb, then Parliamentary Secretary for Immigration and Multicultural Affairs, told a conference in November 2006 that some Australians worried the term "multicultural" had been transformed by interest groups into a philosophy that put "allegiances to original culture ahead of national loyalty, a philosophy which fosters separate development, a federation of ethnic cultures, not one community". He added: "A community of separate cultures fosters a rights mentality, rather than a responsibilities mentality. It is divisive. It works against quick and effective integration." The Australian citizenship test commenced in October 2007 for all new citizens between the ages of 18 and 60.

In January 2007, the Howard Government removed the word "multicultural" from the name of the Department of Immigration and Multicultural Affairs, changing its name to the Department of Immigration and Citizenship.

=== Intellectual critique ===
The earliest academic critics of multiculturalism in Australia were the philosophers Lachlan Chipman and Frank Knopfelmacher, sociologist Tanya Birrell and the political scientist Raymond Sestito. Chipman and Knopfelmacher were concerned with threats to social cohesion, while Birrell's concern was that multiculturalism obscures the social costs associated with large scale immigration that fall most heavily on the most recently arrived and unskilled immigrants. Sestito's arguments were based on the role of political parties. He argued that political parties were instrumental in pursuing multicultural policies, and that these policies would put strain on the political system and would not promote better understanding in the Australian community.

It was the high-profile historian Geoffrey Blainey, however, who first achieved mainstream recognition for the anti-multiculturalist cause when he wrote that multiculturalism threatened to transform Australia into a "cluster of tribes". In his 1984 book All for Australia, Blainey criticised multiculturalism for tending to "emphasise the rights of ethnic minorities at the expense of the majority of Australians" and also for tending to be "anti-British", even though "people from the United Kingdom and Ireland form the dominant class of pre-war immigrants and the largest single group of post-war immigrants."

According to Blainey, such a policy, with its "emphasis on what is different and on the rights of the new minority rather than the old majority," was unnecessarily creating division and threatened national cohesion. He argued that "the evidence is clear that many multicultural societies have failed and that the human cost of the failure has been high" and warned that "we should think very carefully about the perils of converting Australia into a giant multicultural laboratory for the assumed benefit of the peoples of the world."

In one of his numerous criticisms of multiculturalism, Blainey wrote:

For the millions of Australians who have no other nation to fall back upon, multiculturalism is almost an insult. It is divisive. It threatens social cohesion. It could, in the long-term, also endanger Australia's military security because it sets up enclaves which in a crisis could appeal to their own homelands for help.

Blainey remained a persistent critic of multiculturalism into the 1990s, denouncing multiculturalism as "morally, intellectually and economically ... a sham".

The late historian John Hirst was another intellectual critic of multiculturalism. He has argued that while multiculturalism might serve the needs of ethnic politics and the demands of certain ethnic groups for government funding for the promotion of their separate ethnic identity, it was a perilous concept on which to base national policy.

Critics associated with the Centre for Population and Urban Research at Monash University have argued that both Right and Left factions in the Australian Labor Party have adopted a multicultural stance for the purposes of increasing their support within the party. A manifestation of this embrace of multiculturalism has been the creation of ethnic branches within the Labor Party and ethnic branch stacking.

Following the upsurge of support for the One Nation Party in 1996, Lebanese-born Australian anthropologist Ghassan Hage published a critique in 1997 of Australian multiculturalism in the book White Nation.

== Canada ==
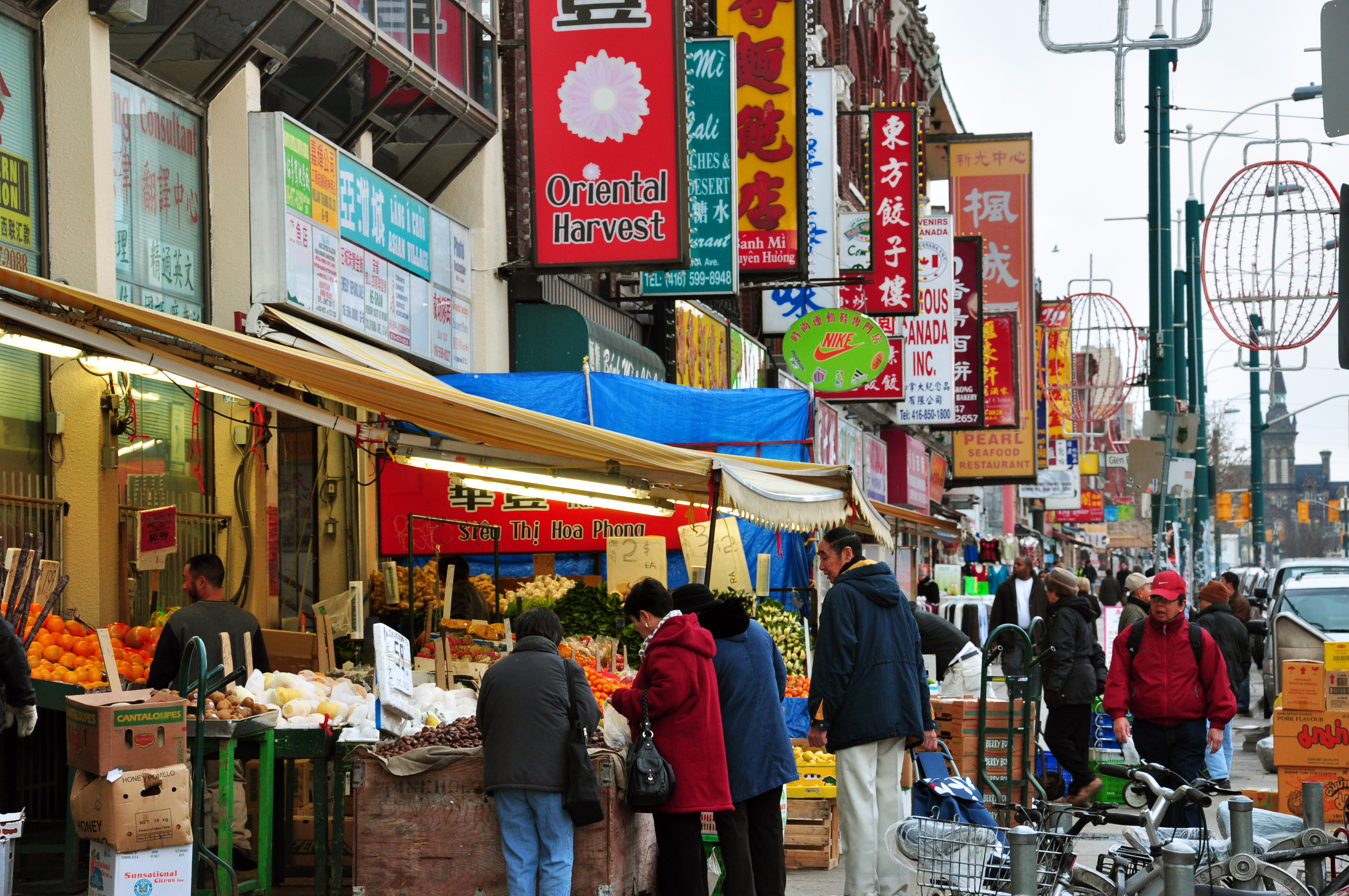
Toronto's Chinatown is an ethnic enclave located in the city centre.

Many Québécois, despite an official national bilingualism policy, insist that multiculturalism threatens to reduce them to just another ethnic group. Quebec's policy seeks to promote interculturalism, welcoming people of all origins while insisting that they integrate into Quebec's majority French-speaking society. In 2008, a Consultation Commission on Accommodation Practices Related to Cultural Differences, headed by sociologist Gerard Bouchard and philosopher Charles Taylor, recognized that Quebec is a de facto pluralist society, but that the Canadian multiculturalism model "does not appear well suited to conditions in Quebec". The Premier of Quebec François Legault openly opposes multiculturalism as a policy, stating that putting all cultures on the same level hurts Quebec and their ability to define themselves as a distinct nation. Quebec Parliament have also passed bills that directly oppose Federal policies of multiculturalism, such as Bill 21 which prevents people who wear religious symbols from participating as public servants.

The leader of the Peoples Party of Canada, Maxime Bernier, has criticized the policy of "extreme multiculturalism". Examples of this would be the naming of a park after foreign historical figures. Bernier believes that diversity is good, but not the 'our' strength. He fears that immigrants with different cultures will have different values, and that the celebration of diversity promotes disunity. His political party has proposed cutting all government funding towards policies of multiculturalism and utilizing funding and resources towards integration. Additionally, they would face-to-face interviews to be conducted on all immigration candidates to ensure their values align with "Canadian Values".

Neil Bissoondath in his book Selling Illusions: The Cult of Multiculturalism in Canada, argues that official multiculturalism limits the freedom of minority members, by confining them to cultural and geographic ethnic enclaves. He also argues that cultures are very complex, and must be transmitted through close family and kin relations. To him, the government view of cultures as being about festivals and cuisine is a crude oversimplification that leads to easy stereotyping.

Daniel Stoffman's book Who Gets In questions the policy of Canadian multiculturalism. Stoffman points out that many cultural practices, such as allowing dog meat to be served in restaurants and street cockfighting, are simply incompatible with what he regards as Canadian (i.e. Western) culture. He also raises concern about the number of recent immigrants who are not being linguistically integrated into Canada (i.e., not learning either English or French). He stresses that multiculturalism works better in theory than in practice and Canadians need to be far more assertive about valuing the "national identity of English-speaking Canada".

== Germany ==
Criticisms of parallel societies established by some immigrant communities increasingly came to the fore in the German public discourse during the 1990s, giving rise to the concept of the Leitkultur ("lead culture"). In October 2010, amid a nationwide controversy about Thilo Sarrazin's bestselling book Deutschland schafft sich ab ("Germany is abolishing Itself"), chancellor Angela Merkel of the conservative Christian Democratic Union judged attempts to build a multicultural society in Germany to have "failed, utterly failed". She added: "The concept that we are now living side by side and are happy about it does not work". She continued to say that immigrants should integrate and adopt Germany's culture and values. This has added to a growing debate within Germany on the levels of immigration, its effect on the country and the degree to which Muslim immigrants have integrated into German society. According to one poll around the time, one-third of Germans believed the country was "overrun by foreigners".

The principle of "Ius sanguinis" complicated citizenship for immigrants, as their dual citizenship was not recognized. This particularly affected the Turkish community in Germany as it led to political setbacks, such as losing in elections. Despite many efforts, there has been a growing disdain towards multiculturalism, accompanied by the rise of far-right parties in Germany. Thus, to reduce populist agendas, there is a growing importance for multicultural policies in addressing the needs of minority groups and immigrants in Germany to improve social cohesion and integration.

== Italy ==
Italy has recently seen a substantial rise in immigration and an influx of African immigrants.

Many intellectuals have opposed multiculturalism, including Ida Magli, professor emeritus of cultural anthropology at the University of Rome. She was a contributor to the weekly L'Espresso and was a columnist for the dailies La Repubblica and Il Giornale. She expressed criticism of multicultural societies.

Another figure opposing multiculturalism was Oriana Fallaci, an Italian journalist, author, and political interviewer. A partisan during World War II, she had a long and successful journalistic career. Fallaci became famous worldwide for her coverage of war and revolution, and her interviews with many world leaders during the 1960s, 1970s, and 1980s. After the September 11 attacks, she returned to the spotlight after writing a series of controversial articles and books critical of Islam and immigration.

== Japan ==
Japanese society, with its homogeneity, has traditionally rejected any need to recognize ethnic differences in Japan, even as such claims have been rejected by such ethnic minorities as the Ainu and Ryukyuans. Former Japanese Prime Minister (Deputy Prime Minister as of 26 December 2012) Taro Aso has called Japan a "one race" nation.

== Malaysia ==
Malaysia is a multicultural society with a Muslim Malay majority and substantial Malaysian Chinese and Malaysian Indian minorities. Criticisms of multiculturalism have been periodically sparked by the entrenched constitutional position the Malay ethnicity enjoys through, inter alia, the Malaysian social contract. Contrary to other countries, in Malaysia affirmative action is often tailored to the needs of the Malay majority population. In 2006, the forced removal of Hindu temples across the country has led to accusations of "an unofficial policy of Hindu temple-cleansing in Malaysia".

== Netherlands ==
Legal philosopher Paul Cliteur attacked multiculturalism in his book The Philosophy of Human Rights. Cliteur rejects all political correctness on the issue: Western culture, the Rechtsstaat (rule of law), and human rights are superior to non-Western culture and values. They are the product of the Enlightenment. Cliteur sees non-Western cultures not as merely different but as anachronistic. He sees multiculturalism primarily as an unacceptable ideology of cultural relativism, which would lead to acceptance of barbaric practices, including those brought to the Western World by immigrants. Cliteur lists honor killings, torture, oppression of women, homophobia, racism, anti-Semitism, gangs, female genital cutting, discrimination by immigrants, and the death penalty. Cliteur compares multiculturalism to the moral acceptance of Auschwitz, Joseph Stalin, Pol Pot and the Ku Klux Klan.

In 2000, Paul Scheffer—a member of the Labour Party and subsequently a professor of urban studies—published his essay "The multicultural tragedy", an essay critical of both immigration and multiculturalism. Scheffer is a committed supporter of the nation-state, assuming that homogeneity and integration are necessary for a society: the presence of immigrants undermines this. A society does have a finite "absorptive capacity" for those from other cultures, he says, but this has been exceeded in the Netherlands. He specifically cites failure to assimilate, spontaneous ethnic segregation, adaptation problems such as school drop-out, unemployment, and high crime rates (see immigration and crime), and opposition to secularism among Muslim immigrants as the main problems resulting from immigration.

== United Kingdom ==
With considerable immigration after the Second World War making the UK an increasingly ethnically and racially diverse state, race relations policies have been developed that broadly reflect the principles of multiculturalism, although there is no official national commitment to the concept. This model has faced criticism on the grounds that it has failed to sufficiently promote social integration, although some commentators have questioned the dichotomy between diversity and integration that this critique presumes. It has been argued that the UK government has since 2001, moved away from policy characterised by multiculturalism and towards the assimilation of minority communities.

Opposition has grown to state sponsored multicultural policies, with some believing that it has been a costly failure. Critics of the policy come from many parts of British society. There is now a debate in the UK over whether explicit multiculturalism and "social cohesion and inclusion" are in fact mutually exclusive. In the wake of the 7 July 2005 London bombings David Davis, the opposition Conservative shadow home secretary, called on the government to scrap its "outdated" policy of multiculturalism.

The British columnist Leo McKinstry has persistently criticized multiculturalism, stating that "Britain is now governed by a suicide cult bent on wiping out any last vestige of nationhood" and called multiculturalism a "profoundly disturbing social experiment".

McKinstry also wrote:

We are paying a terrible price for the creed of Left-wing politicians. They pose as champions of progress yet their fixation with multiculturalism is dragging us into a new dark age. In many of our cities, social solidarity is being replaced by divisive tribalism, democracy by identity politics. Real integration is impossible when ethnic groups are encouraged to cling to customs, practices, even languages from their homeland.

Trevor Phillips, the head of the Commission for Racial Equality, who has called for an official end to multicultural policy, has criticised "politically correct liberals for their "misguided" pandering to the ethnic lobby".

Journalist Ed West argued in his 2013 book, The Diversity Illusion, that the British political establishment had uncritically embraced multiculturalism without proper consideration of the downsides of ethnic diversity. He wrote:

Everyone in a position of power held the same opinion. Diversity was a good in itself, so making Britain truly diverse would enrich it and bring 'significant cultural contributions', reflecting a widespread belief among the ruling classes that multiculturalism and cultural, racial and religious diversity were morally positive things whatever the consequences. This is the unthinking assumption held by almost the entire political, media and education establishment. It is the diversity illusion.

West has also argued:

Advocates of multiculturalism argue that immigrants prefer to stick together because of racism and the fear of racial violence, as well as the bonds of community. This is perfectly reasonable, but if this is the case, why not the same for natives too? If multiculturalism is right because minorities feel better among themselves, why have mass immigration at all, since it must obviously make everyone miserable? (And if diversity 'enriches' and strengthens, why integrate, since that will only reduce diversity?) All the arguments for multiculturalism—that people feel safer, more comfortable among people of the same group, and that they need their own cultural identity—are arguments against immigration, since English people must also feel the same. If people categorised as "white Britons" are not afforded that indulgence because they are a majority, do they attain it when they become a minority?

In the May 2004 edition of Prospect Magazine, the editor David Goodhart temporarily couched the debate on multiculturalism in terms of whether a modern welfare state and a "good society" is sustainable as its citizens become increasingly diverse.

In November 2005, John Sentamu, the Archbishop of York, stated, "Multiculturalism has seemed to imply, wrongly for me: let other cultures be allowed to express themselves but do not let the majority culture at all tell us its glories, its struggles, its joys, its pains." The Bishop of Rochester Michael Nazir-Ali was also critical, calling for the Church to regain a prominent position in public life and blaming the "newfangled and insecurely founded doctrine of multiculturalism" for entrenching the segregation of communities.

Whilst minority cultures are allowed to remain distinct, British culture and traditions are sometimes perceived as exclusive and adapted accordingly, often without the consent of the local population. For instance, Birmingham City Council was heavily criticised when it was alleged to have renamed Christmas as "Winterval" in 1998, although in truth it had done no such thing.

In August 2006, the community and local government secretary Ruth Kelly made a speech perceived as signalling the end of multiculturalism as official policy. In November 2006, Prime Minister Tony Blair stated that Britain has certain "essential values" and that these are a "duty". He did not reject multiculturalism outright, but he included British heritage among the essential values:

When it comes to our essential values—belief in democracy, the rule of law, tolerance, equal treatment for all, respect for this country and its shared heritage—then that is where we come together, it is what we hold in common.

== United States ==
The US Congress passed the Emergency Quota Act in 1921, followed by the Immigration Act of 1924. The Immigration Act of 1924 was aimed at further restricting Southern and Eastern Europeans, especially Italians and Slavs, who had begun to enter the country in large numbers starting in the 1890s.

Many criticisms were expressed in the 1980s and 1990s, from both the left and right. Criticisms come from a wide variety of perspectives, but predominantly from the standpoint of liberal individualism, from American conservatives concerned about shared traditional values, and from a national unity perspective.

A prominent criticism in the US, later echoed in Europe, Canada and Australia, was that multiculturalism undermined national unity, hindered social integration and cultural assimilation, and led to the fragmentation of society into several ethnic factions (Balkanization).

In 1991, Arthur M. Schlesinger, Jr., a former advisor to the Kennedy and other US administrations and Pulitzer Prize winner, published a book critical of multiculturalism with the title The Disuniting of America: Reflections on a Multicultural Society.

In his 1991 work, Illiberal Education, Dinesh D'Souza argues that the entrenchment of multiculturalism in American universities undermined the universalist values that liberal education once attempted to foster. In particular, he was disturbed by the growth of ethnic studies programs (e.g., black studies).

The late Samuel P. Huntington, political scientist and author, known for his Clash of Civilizations theory, described multiculturalism as "basically an anti-Western ideology." According to Huntington, multiculturalism had "attacked the identification of the United States with Western civilization, denied the existence of a common American culture, and promoted racial, ethnic, and other subnational cultural identities and groupings." Huntington outlined the risks he associated with multiculturalism in his 2004 book Who Are We? The Challenges to America's National Identity.

== See also ==
- Cultural critic
- Ethnic penalty
- Ethnic nationalism
- Immigration and crime
- Opposition to immigration
- Monoculturalism
- Multiculturalism and Islam
- Nationalism
- Cultural assimilation
- Divide and rule
- Racism
- Xenophobia

=== Assimilation ===
- Race traitor
- Criticism of Catholicism
- Cultural conflict
- Protracted social conflict
- Undercover Mosque
- Stop Islamisation of Europe
- English Defence League
- Londonistan: How Britain is Creating a Terror State Within
- Eurabia
- Silent Holocaust (Judaism)
- White genocide (Armenians)
