= Savi Naipaul Akal =

Trinidadian memoirist (1938–2024)

Savitri (Savi) Naipaul Akal
- Born: Savitri Naipaul; April 1938; Lion House, Chaguanas, Trinidad
- Died: 2024 (aged 85–86)
- Education: University of Edinburgh (1961–1963), University of the West Indies at St. Augustine (1968, 1973)
- Occupations: Memoirist, teacher, boutique retailer
- Children: 3
- Relatives: Seepersad Naipaul (father), Shiva Naipaul (brother), V.S. Naipaul (brother), Neil Bissoondath (nephew)
- Writing career
- Genre: Memoir
- Subject: Capildeo family
- Notable work: The Naipauls of Nepaul Street

Savitri (Savi) Naipaul Akal (April 1938 – 2024) was a memoirist and teacher from Trinidad. She was the daughter of author Seepersad Naipaul and his wife Droapatie (née Capildeo), and the sister of V. S. Naipaul and Shiva Naipaul.

== Early life and education ==
Savitri (Savi) Naipaul Akal was born at the Lion House in Chaguanas, Trinidad, in April 1938. She was the fifth child and fourth daughter of Droapatie Naipaul (née Capildeo) and Seepersad Naipaul.

The Naipaul family lived for a time at Lion House (Anand Bhavan), the historic home of the Capildeo family in Trinidad, before living at 26 Nepaul Street (now Naipaul House and Literary Museum). Both houses were memorialised in her brother V. S. Naipaul's novel A House for Mr Biswas, and would be revisited by Naipaul Akal in her memoir, The Naipauls of Nepaul Street.

Naipaul Akal studied at Tranquillity Intermediate School and St. Joseph's Convent in Port of Spain. She obtained a BA degree partially from University of Edinburgh in Scotland (1961–1963), and completed at the University of the West Indies at St. Augustine, Trinidad (1968). She followed this with a Diploma of Education in 1973.

== Career ==
From 1968 to 1972, Naipaul Akal worked as a part-time tutor in Sociology at the University of the West Indies at St. Augustine, Trinidad, followed by a full-time post as a teacher of Geography at the Convent schools and at Tranquillity. In 1980, she retired from the latter, having risen to Vice-Principal. Until the 2010s, she ran an up-scale boutique, Smaks, in Valsayn.

In 2018, Naipaul Akal published her memoir of the literary Naipaul family, The Naipauls of Nepaul Street (Leeds: Peepal Tree Press, 2018). Both she and her sister Kamla had wanted to write a memoir about the family and their time at 26 Nepaul Street (now Naipaul House and Literary Museum), but Savi had deferred to her elder sister. When Kamla passed before she could accomplish it, Savi's surviving family encouraged her to write the memoir.

== The Naipauls of Nepaul Street ==
Savi Naipaul Akal's memoir The Naipauls of Nepaul Street tells of the Naipaul family's literary beginnings, their life at 26 Nepaul Street (now Naipaul House and Literary Museum), and the eventual emigrations and dispersals that led to the end of their time there. In the book, she tells the story of her parents, and their role in the large family of seven children.

The memoir is unique in expanding upon the lives of the Naipaul women, who were often overlooked in literary biographies until that point. Though the women of the Naipaul family were briefly given additional focus when Nicholas Laughlin added unpublished correspondences with these women to Letters between a Father and Son (as co-editor of its second edition), V. S. Naipaul later removed these letters and restored the earlier text for subsequent editions.

Naipaul Akal writes of how her mother, Droapatie, managed the family's finances and ensured all seven children (including the five daughters) went to university. She also explains that V. S. used his mother as a source of information — via savage "interrogations" — to inform his own writing. The book also explores Droapatie's diplomatic handling of her husband's desire for independence — as well as his job as a reporter and his literary ambitions — against the demands of being a part of the large, high-profile Capildeo family.

The book also covers the time V. S. Naipaul was in Oxford, his "war of words" with their brother Shiva, and the surprise early deaths of their father Seepersad and then Shiva, too. Like Vidia's early work, she portrays a family encouraged by Seepersad's belief that books and literature would be a way to better themselves.

Writing in the Trinidad Express, historian Bridget Brereton called the book "lively" and "moving", and said it was "a valuable record of a remarkable family and a formative period in Trinidad's social and cultural evolution".

In The Spectator, reviewer Patrick Skene-Catling describes Naipaul Akal herself as "evidently ... sharply observant as well as affectionate" and says that the author mostly maintains "admirable moderation, balance and good humour" on her subjects. On the subject of her brother V. S. Naipaul, however, he argues that Vidia's own work needs to be read alongside Naipaul Akal's to offer some "justification" for the actions she criticises.

Naipaul Akal donated photographs to Naipaul House for its restoration as a museum. Her son, Ashvin, donated much of the museum's memorabilia and is the treasurer of the organisation charged with managing the museum, the Friends of Mr Biswas.

== Personal life ==
Naipaul Akal married into the Akal family. Her son Kiran has developed her former Valsayn-based boutique into an international tea and spirits brand, SMAKS Luxury Group. Her other son, Ashvin, is treasurer of the Friends of Mr Biswas — the group that manages Naipaul House and Literary Museum.

Naipaul Akal remained close with her brothers and sisters. Though V. S. Naipaul moved away at 18 and her brother Shiva died at the age of 40—Naipaul Akal publicly lamented the "war of words" between the brothers—she maintained communication with Vidia throughout his life and was on good terms with him when he passed.
