= Love and Death in a Hot Country =

A Hot Country (published as Love and Death in a Hot Country in the US) was the last novel to be written by Shiva Naipaul and also his shortest in length. It was published in 1983.

Before its publication, Naipaul had not written a novel in ten years. A Hot Country departs from the comic style of his earlier novels Fireflies and The Chip-Chip Gatherers.

It is set during an election in the fictional Caribbean country of Cuyama, thought to be based on Guyana, where Naipaul had researched his book Black & White about the Jonestown Massacre, which profoundly affected him.
