= An Unfinished Journey =

An Unfinished Journey may refer to:

- An Unfinished Journey (book), a 1986 collection of essays by Shiva Naipaul
- An Unfinished Journey (film), a 2024 Canadian-French documentary film
