= Geoffrey Langlands =

British educationalist (1917–2019)

Major Geoffrey Langlands CMG MBE HI SPk
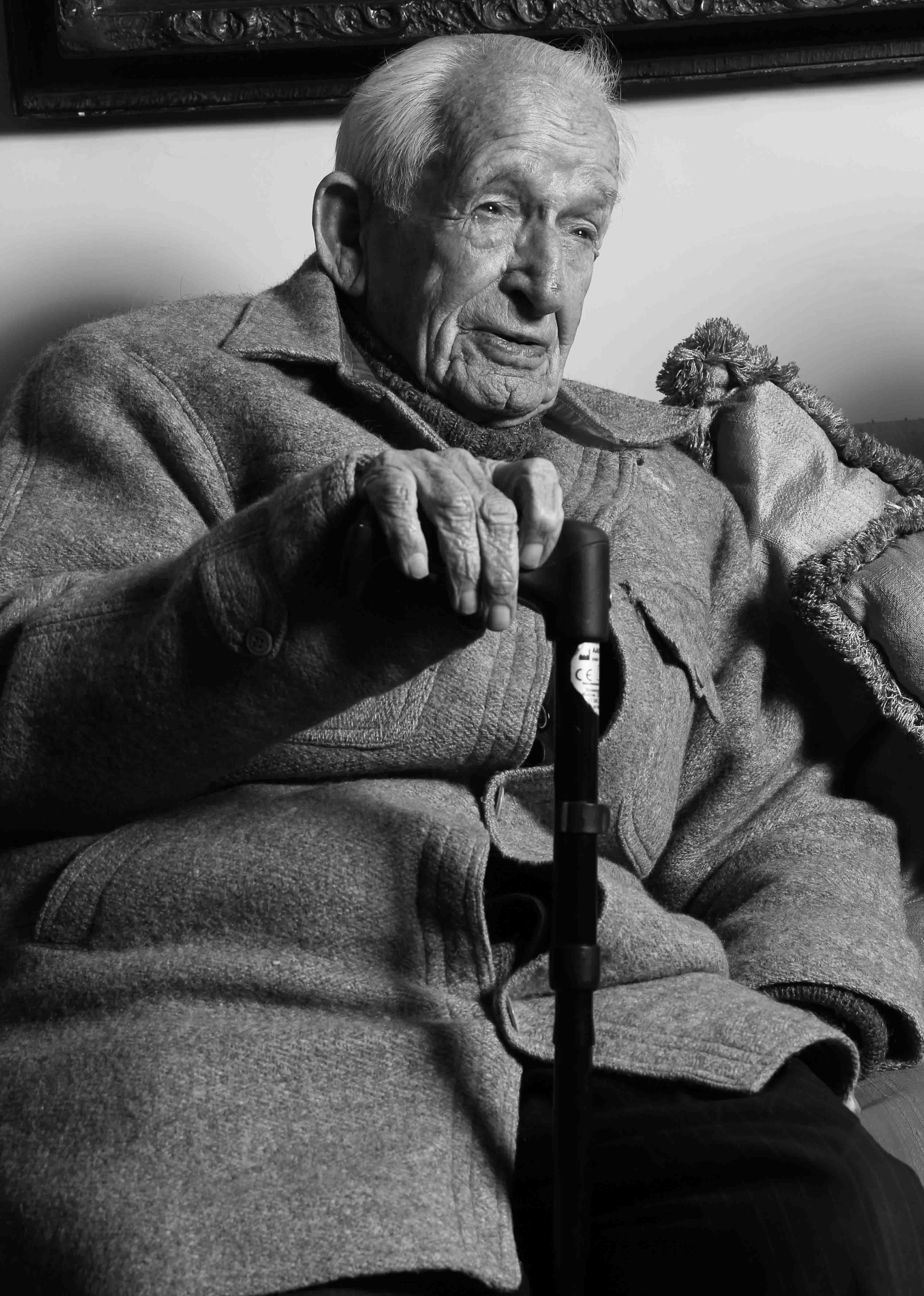
- Langlands in 2012
- Born: Geoffrey Douglas Langlands; 21 October 1917; Kingston upon Hull, England, United Kingdom
- Died: 2 January 2019 (aged 101); Lahore, Pakistan
- Military career
- Branch: British Army (1939-1944); British Indian Army (1944-1947); Pakistan Army (1947-1953)
- Service years: 1939–1953
- Rank: Major
- Nickname: The Major
- Conflicts: World War II; Indo-Pakistani War of 1947
- Awards: Sitara-e-Pakistan; Hilal-i-Imtiaz; Order of St Michael and St George; Order of the British Empire
- Other work: Headmaster Aitchison College; Principal Cadet College Razmak; Principal Langlands School and College

Geoffrey Douglas Langlands CMG, MBE, HI, SPk (21 October 1917 – 2 January 2019) was a British educationalist and former army officer who spent most of his life teaching in and leading schools in Pakistan, instructing many of the country's elite.

In World War II, he joined the British Army as a volunteer and became a commando, taking part in the Dieppe Raid. He was posted to British India in 1944 and opted for the Indian Army, where he worked to keep the peace during the Partition of British India in 1947. He subsequently transferred to the Pakistani Army where he trained army officers.

At the invitation of President Ayub Khan in the 1960s, he joined the so-called "Eton of Pakistan", Aitchison College in Lahore. After 25 years there, he left to lead a military high school, Cadet College Razmak. He ended his career by taking on a new school in Chitral and raising it to internationally high standards; he continued to lead it into his 90s, when it was renamed in his honour Langlands School and College.

== Early life ==
Langlands was born in 21 October 1917 in Yorkshire, with a twin brother, in Hull, England, to a father employed in an Anglo-American company and a mother who was a classical folk dance instructor. His father died in the 1918 flu pandemic that killed millions worldwide. His mother then took her children to her parents' home in Bristol.

She died of cancer ten years later, as soon thereafter did the children's grandfather, leaving Langlands and his siblings without any living relatives. He was given a free place at King’s College, Taunton (a private - i.e.fee-paying - school) by its headmaster, a family friend. His older brother received a scholarship to an orphan school in Bristol, and a family friend helped secure positions for the other children.

== Career ==
=== Military career (1939-1953) ===
In July 1935, Langlands completed his A Level education and began his teaching career in London, the following year at age 18. In September 1936, he was a mathematics and science teacher to second grade students in a school in Croydon. When World War II began in 1939, Langlands joined the British Army as an enlisted soldier. In 1942, Langlands became a commando and took part in the Dieppe Raid.

In January 1944, Langlands arrived in British India as an army volunteer on a troop carrier and worked three years as part of the selection board for officers training in Bangalore. Rising to the acting rank of troop sergeant major, he received an emergency commission in the British Indian Army as a second lieutenant in the Garhwal Rifles on 3 September 1944. After Bangalore, Langlands was stationed in Dehradun. He was promoted to temporary captain on 28 July 1945, subsequently transferring to the 14th Punjab Regiment. During the partition of the sub-continent in 1947 when India and Pakistan became independent nations, Langlands decided to move to Pakistan and was transferred to Rawalpindi where he joined the Pakistan Army.

=== Teaching career ===
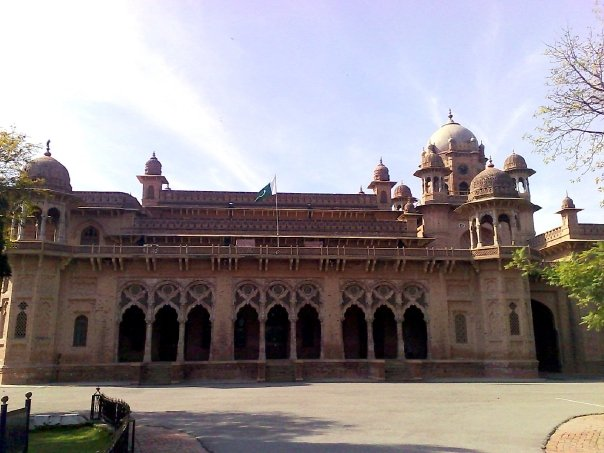
Aitchison College

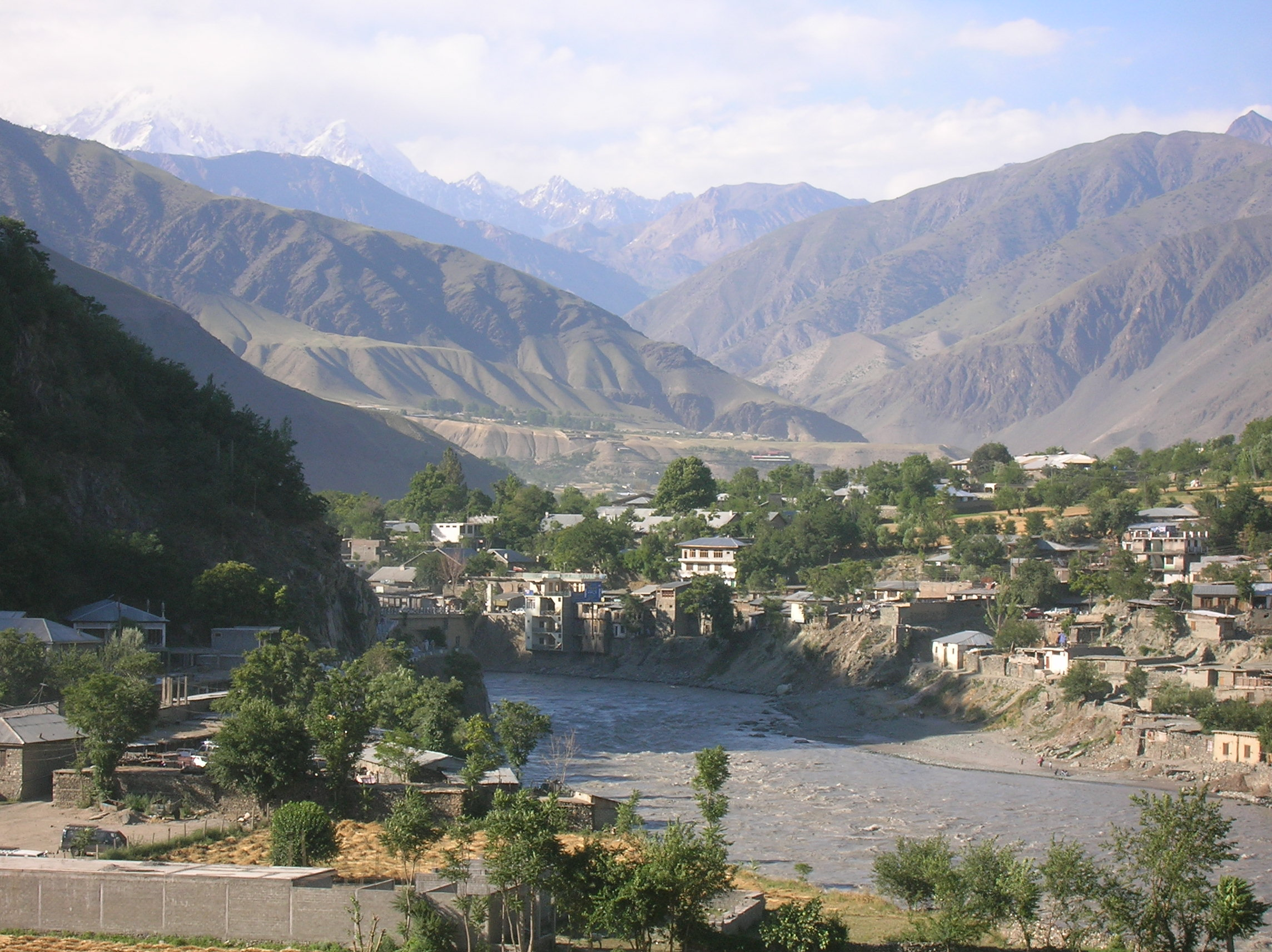
Chitral in summer

Langlands began his career in Pakistan by working as an instructor for the country's newly created army. He selected and trained officers for approximately six years. Upon the completion of the contract with Pakistan Army, British Army troops began to leave the country, and Langlands had to decide what to do next. Ayub Khan, then President of Pakistan, asked him to stay and teach, which he immediately agreed to do.

He devoted the next 25 years to the so-called "Eton of Pakistan", Aitchison College in Lahore, teaching mathematics to "upper-crust young Pakistanis destined to lead in business, politics and the army" and rising to be the college's dean and headmaster of its prep school.

In 1979, the Chief Minister of the Northwest Frontier Province (now Khyber Pakhtunkhwa) offered Langlands the post of principal at Cadet College Razmak in North Waziristan. IN April Langlands joined the Cadet College, which had been created only the year before, and served until September 1989.

In late 1989, Langlands took charge of the first private school in Chitral, which was later renamed Langlands School and College in his honour. The school, founded in September 1988 by local Deputy Commissioner Javed Majeed, grew steadily under his leadership. From 80 pupils it grew to 800, about a third girls, and many won scholarships to universities.

Langlands served the school for the rest of his life. He suffered a stroke in 2008, which hastened the search for a replacement. By the time Declan Walsh reported on the man and the school in 2009, it was clear that standards had slipped, and the financial situation was parlous; the district's top official said Langlands was "A brilliant teacher but not a good manager." Eventually another principal was found, and Langlands reluctantly agreed to move to grace and favour accommodation on the grounds of Aitchison College, as it was thought that he could do more good for the Chitral school by fundraising in the capital. At the age of 94 in September 2012, he moved back to Lahore.

Langlands disagreed with some of the changes his successor - also a British citizen - began to put in place. He attempted to prevent Carey Schofield from doing her work by asking a former pupil, Chaudhary Nisar Ali Khan, the Interior Minister, to deny her a work visa. Eventually scores of the college staff boarded a school bus for the 1000 km drive to Lahore, where they met with Langlands and persuaded him to allow Schofield to continue her work.

He turned 100 in October 2017, which was celebrated with a party which many luminaries attended, as reported in Dawn.

== Death and legacy ==
Geoffrey Langlands died at the age of 101 in a hospital in Lahore on 2 January 2019 following a brief illness. Al-Jazeera called him one of the country's "most respected educators" The BBC said his "death [sent] a whole country into mourning"

Many of his students, especially those from Aitchison College, rose to high places. One of those was the Prime Minister of Pakistan Imran Khan. In a tweet he paid tribute: "Apart from being our teacher, he instilled the love for trekking and our northern areas in me - before the KKH (Karakoram Highway) was built". Other former students include Foreign Minister Shah Mahmood Qureshi and Aleem Khan.

Aaj News called Langlands "a phenomenon":

Generations of Pakistanis owe their education to him. In a career lasting 60 years, he has sought to maintain the ethos of the English public school in an alien land, long after the sun set on the empire he served. Britain has changed out of all recognition since Langlands departed its shores in the middle of the Second World War to serve with the Indian Army. By going away and staying away, his old-fashioned brand of Britishness, involving service rather than gain, has been preserved.

== Recognition ==
- Member of the Order of the British Empire (MBE; 1982)
- Order of St Michael and St George (CMG; 2010)
- Hilal-e-Imtiaz (HI; 2011)
- Sitara-i-Imtiaz (1987)
- Sitara-i-Pakistan (SPk, 2004)

== See also ==
- Hugh Catchpole – British educator who lived in Pakistan
- Ruth Pfau – medical doctor who served leprosy patients in Pakistan
- Hal Bevan-Petman – English artist who lived in Pakistan and painted many famous Pakistanis
- Maureen P. Lines – British social worker who worked with the Kalasha people of Northern Pakistan
