= Neil Bissoondath =

Trinidadian-Canadian author

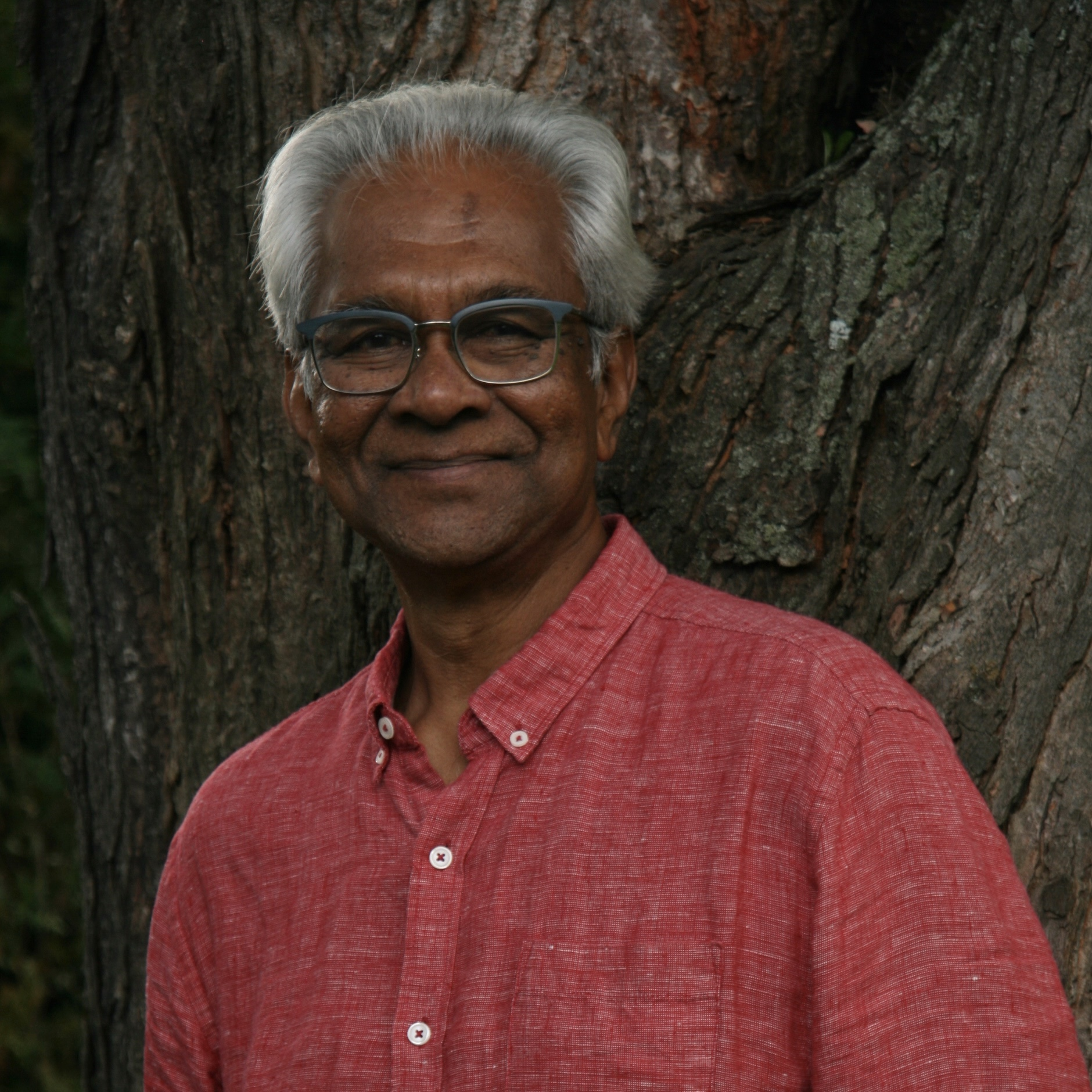
Image of Neil Bissoondath

Neil Devindra Bissoondath OC CQ (born 19 April 1955) is a Trinidadian-Canadian author who lives in Quebec City, Quebec, Canada. He is a noted writer of fiction. He is an outspoken critic of Canada's system of multiculturalism, and is the nephew of authors V. S. Naipaul, Shiva Naipaul, and Savi Naipaul Akal; grandson of Seepersad Naipaul; grandnephew of Rudranath Capildeo and Simbhoonath Capildeo; and cousin of Vahni Capildeo.

== Life and career ==
Born in Arima, Bissoondath attended St. Mary's College, located in his home borough of Arima in Trinidad and Tobago. Although he was from a Hindu tradition, he was able to adapt to a Catholic high school. He describes himself as not very religious and distrustful of dogma. In the early 1970s, political upheaval and economic collapse had created a climate of chaos and violence in the island nation.

In 1973, at the age of 18, Bissoondath left Trinidad and settled in Ontario, where he studied at York University and received a Bachelor of Arts in French in 1977. He then taught English and French at the Inlingua School of Languages and the Toronto Language Workshop. He won the McClelland and Stewart award and the National Magazine award, both in 1986, for the short story "Dancing". Bissoondath was interviewed by Ali Lakhani in the journal Rungh about his views on writing and life.

== Awards ==
He won the Writers' Trust of Canada's Gordon Montador Award in 1995 for Selling Illusions.

Bissoondath has received honorary doctorates from Glendon College, York University and Université de Moncton. In 2010 he was made a Chevalier of the Ordre national du Québec. In 2012, he was awarded the NALIS (National Library of Trinidad and Tobago) Lifetime Literary Achievement Award.

== Bibliography ==
=== Novels ===
- A Casual Brutality (ISBN 9781896951409) – 1989
- The Innocence of Age – 1993
- The Worlds Within Her (ISBN 9781896951874) – 1999 (Nominated for a Governor General's Award)
- Doing the Heart Good (ISBN 9781896951645) – 2002
- The Unyielding Clamour of the Night (ISBN 9781896951874) – 2005
- The Soul of All Great Designs (ISBN 9781897151327) – 2008

=== Novella ===
- Postcards from Hell – 2009

=== Short story collections ===
- Digging Up Mountains – 1986
- On the Eve of Uncertain Tomorrows – 1990

=== Non-fiction ===
- Selling Illusions: The Cult of Multiculturalism in Canada 1994

== See also ==
- Capildeo family
