= Fireflies (novel) =

1970 novel by Shiva Naipaul

Fireflies is a novel by Shiva Naipaul originally published in 1970. It was his first book, a comic novel set in Trinidad. In an essay in An Unfinished Journey, Naipaul described how in 1968 as a final year student at Oxford University studying Chinese, he had been moved to write down a sentence, which proved to be the beginning of his first novel, which he then worked on for the next two years. The novel was hailed on publication, winning the Jock Campbell New Statesman Award, the John Llewellyn Rhys Prize and the Winifred Holtby Memorial Prize.

Writer Martin Amis said of Fireflies

The moment I finished his first novel, Fireflies, I felt delight in being alive at the same time as such a writer. I passed the book round to friends (I must have bought half a dozen of those Penguins), and there are many with whom I can initiate a long train of quotation - and laughter - from that book alone.
