= Gurudeva and Other Indian Tales =

Gurudeva and Other Indian Tales is a collection of short stories by Seepersad Naipaul. It was first published in Trinidad and Tobago in 1943.

Seepersad Naipaul was a journalist on the staff of the Trinidad and Tobago Guardian. He hoped to find a British publisher for his stories with a view to alleviating his family's financial difficulties. However, he died in his 40s. His son V. S. Naipaul continued the search for a British publisher for his father's work. V. S. Naipaul contributed a foreword when, in 1976, 23 years after the elder Naipaul's death, the collection was re-edited as The Adventures of Gurudeva, and Other Stories and published by André Deutsch.

The publisher Peepal Tree Press intends to republish the collection in 2026 under its original title. It has already republished some of Seepersad Naipaul's journalism for the Trinidad and Tobago Guardian as Seepersad Naipaul, Amazing Scenes: Selected Journalism 1928–1953 (Peepal Tree Press 2024).
