= Carey Schofield =

British journalist, writer, and educator

Carey Schofield OBE (born 1953) is the British principal of Langlands School and College in Pakistan, noted for its academic excellence. She had a previous career as a journalist and writer, particularly on military affairs.

== Career ==
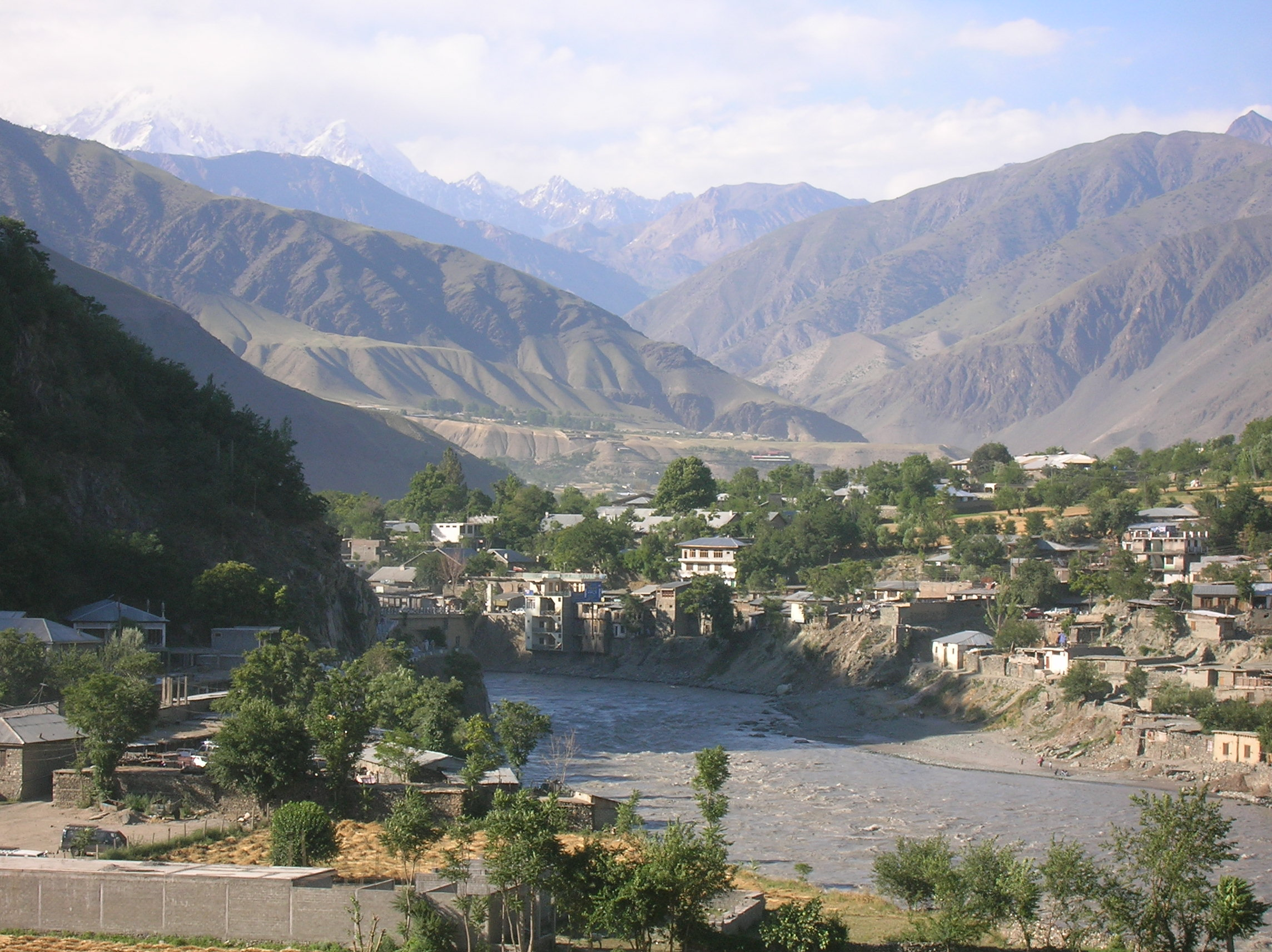
Chitral in summer

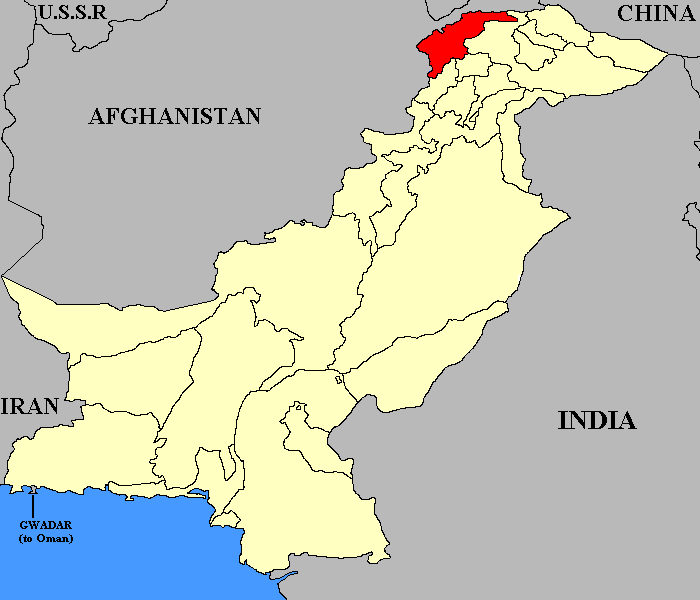
Chitral map

=== Writing ===
After a degree in English at Clare College, Cambridge, in the late 1970s Schofield began working as a journalist, and wrote her first book, a lively biography of the French gangster Jacques Mesrine. This was followed by "a coolheaded, slickly written account" of the life of Mick Jagger of the Rolling Stones. From rock biography she went on to military affairs, publishing two books on the Soviet Army. With the support of the President of Pakistan Pervez Musharraf, Schofield spent five years embedded with the Pakistan Armed Forces, interviewing all ranks for Inside the Pakistan Army (2011) One of her informants was Special Forces commander Ameer Faisal Alavi, assassinated in 2008. During these years, she reported for the Sunday Times.

=== Langlands College ===
Although she had experience as a state school governor in Britain, she had never taught for a living before taking on the challenge of leading Langlands School and College, in North-west Pakistan. The school, despite its remote location (in Chitral in the Hindu Kush mountains), had developed a reputation for academic excellence, sending its students on to national and international universities. The man it was named for - and its head for almost all of its existence - was Major Geoffrey Langlands, a legend in Pakistani education, having taught many of the country's elite. He was in his 90s, and Schofield was brought in to help recruit his successor, but instead was offered the job herself. He described her as "extraordinary", not least because she was unafraid of the security situation, which had frightened away several candidates. Aaj News interviewed her shortly after her appointment:

Miss Schofield has forsaken her home near London’s fashionable Sloane Square for a mountain fastness. So why, at the age of 59, has she abandoned an enviable lifestyle in Britain to come here? “Because it would be nice to make a difference,” she says, speaking for the first time about her new job. “It is good in middle age to be able to do something useful. The College and its associated primary schools educate a thousand pupils. If we can turn them around it will improve a thousand young lives. The job is daunting but worth doing.” And the Taliban? “Chitral is safer than Chelsea [a prosperous area of central London]. [...] The risk is very slight.”

In the years following the Major's stroke, his ability to manage the school had declined, and Schofield had some hard decisions to take at the beginning of her tenure; she described the school as being "in a parlous state". She sacked seven members of staff (including the vice-principal) for "conduct unbecoming", which led to plotting against her; while she was out of the country, her work visa was denied, leaving her unable to return. Her enforced absence coincided with the October 2015 Hindu Kush earthquake and exceptionally bad flooding in the region, which complicated matters as she tried to run the school from her kitchen table in London.

The Board of Governors respected her efforts to turn the school around, and following lobbying by her staff, after eight months Schofield was allowed to return. She has improved discipline and finances. Her innovations at the school, where all lessons are in English, include appointing a learning support coordinator for pupils with dyslexia and dyspraxia, and "working to strengthen contacts with leading schools and educationists from across the world".

In the 2019 New Year Honours, she was awarded an OBE for "services to education and the community in northern Pakistan".

In August 2026, she was awarded the Hilal-i-Quaid-i-Azam ("Crescent of Great Leader") by the Pakistani government for "services to Pakistan".

== Works ==
- Mesrine - The Life and Death of a Supercrook. Penguin, 1980.
- Jagger. Methuen Publishing, 1983.
- Inside the Soviet Military. Abbeville Press, 1991.
- The Russian Elite: Inside Spetsnaz and the Airborne Forces. Greenhill Books, 1993.
- Inside the Pakistan Army: A Woman’s Experience on the Frontline of the War on Terror. Biteback Publishing, 2011.
