= Capildeo family =

Indo-Trinidadian family

- Parent family: Dubey
- Current region: Trinidad and Tobago; India; United Kingdom; United States of America; Canada
- Etymology: From Capil Deo Dubey; Capil Deo
- Origin: Mahadeva Dubey Village, Gorakhpur district, North-Western Provinces, British India (present-day Mahadeva Dubey Village, Maharajganj district, Gorakhpur division, Uttar Pradesh, India)
- Founder: Pundit Capildeo Dubey
- Titles: Pundit; Leader of the Opposition of Trinidad and Tobago; Member of the Legislative Council; Member of Parliament; Senator; Secretary General of the Sanatan Dharma Maha Sabha
- Members: Pundit Capildeo Dubey; Soogee Capildeo; Rudranath Capildeo; Simbhoonath Capildeo; Surendranath Capildeo; Vahni Capildeo; Droapatie Capildeo; V. S. Naipaul; Shiva Naipaul; Savi Naipaul Akal; Neil Bissoondath; Kalawatee Permanand
- Connected members: Seepersad Naipaul and Nadira Naipaul
- Connected families: Gobin family, Naipaul family, Permanand family, Bissoondath family, Maraj family, Tewari family, Goswami family
- Traditions: Sanātanī Hinduism
- Estates: Anand Bhavan (आनंद भवन; Mansion of Bliss) a.k.a. The Lion House, Main Road Chaguanas, Trinidad and Tobago
- Website: http://www.thelionhouse.com/

The Capildeo family (pronounced [kəpiləd̪eːoː]) is an Indo-Trinidadian and Tobagonian family of Hindu pundits, politicians, scientists, attorneys, and writers. The most notable members are 2001 Nobel laureate V. S. Naipaul and mathematician and politician Rudranath Capildeo. The ancestral home of the Capildeo family is The Lion House, or Anand Bhavan, on Chaguanas Main Road; according to the National Trust of Trinidad and Tobago, Pundit Capildeo began constructing it in 1924, completed it in 1926, and named it Anand Bhavan, meaning "Mansion of Bliss". No-one today knows how the name Kapil transformed into Capildeo. It is possible that Kapil added dev, meaning God, from his village's name of Mahadeva Dubey to his name. Transliteration from Hindi to English was not well developed in the 19th century and words were spelt differently then from the way they are now. Thus, Kapil was changed to Capil and dev to deo, giving Kapil's descendants the surname of Capildeo.

== Family tree ==
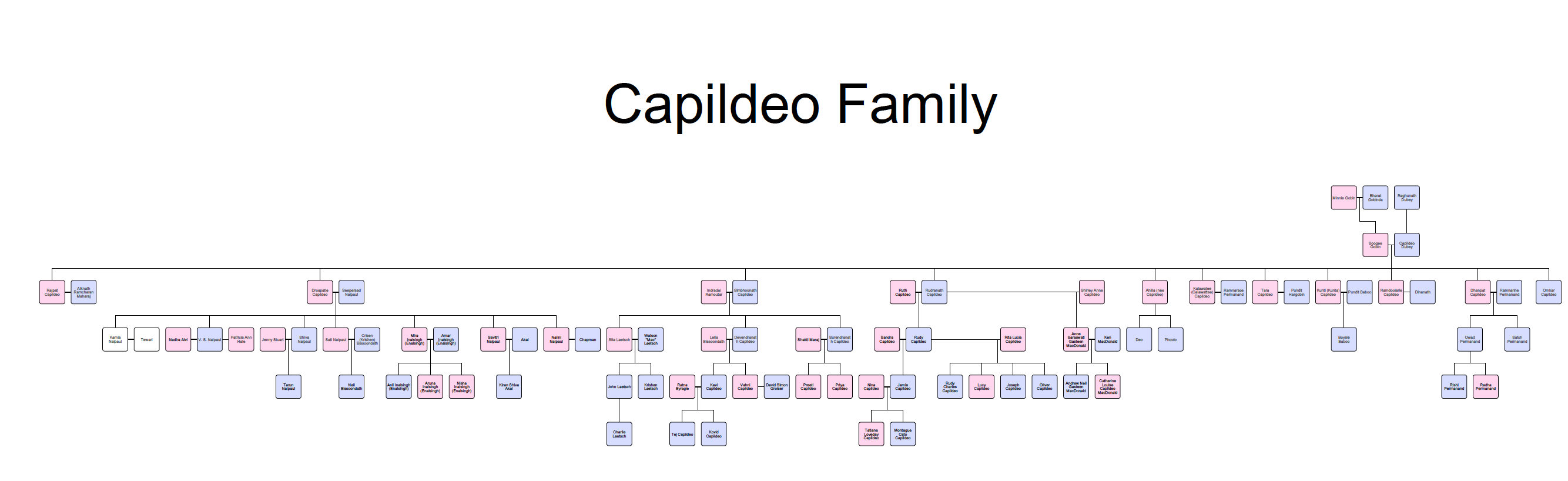
Capildeo genealogy tree
- Pt. Raghunath Dubey
  - Pt. Capil Deo Dubey a.k.a. Pundit Capildeo (1873 – 1926)= Soogee Capildeo (née Gobin) (1880 – 1952) (daughter of Bharat Gobinda and Minnie Gobin)
    - Droapatie Naipaul (née Capildeo) (1913 –1991) = Seepersad Naipaul (1906 –1953)
      - Sati Bissoondath (née Naipaul) = Crisen (Krishen) Bissoondath
        - Neil Bissoondath (1955 – )
      - Kamla Tewari (née Naipaul) (1929 – 2009)
        - Shalini Tewari
      - V. S. Naipaul (1932 – 2018) = Patricia Ann Naipaul (née Hale) †
      - V. S. Naipaul (1932 – 2018) = Nadira Naipaul (née Alvi) (1953 – )
      - Mira Naipaul Inalsingh (Enalsingh) = Amar Inalsingh (Enalsingh)
        - Aruna Inalsingh (Enalsingh)
        - Anil Inalsingh (Enalsingh)
        - Nisha Inalsingh (Enalsingh)
      - Savitri Naipaul-Akal
        - Kiran Shiva Akal
        - Ashvin Rai Akal
        - Siri Shamin Akal
      - Shiva Naipaul (1945 – 1985) = Jenny Naipaul (née Stuart)
        - Tarun Naipaul (1974 – )
      - Nalini Naipaul Chapman
    - Simbhoonath Capildeo (1914 – 1990) = Indradai Capildeo (née Ramoutar) (1920 – 2009)
      - Sita Capildeo (1936 – 2019) = Watson 'Mac' Laetsch
        - John Laetsch
          - Charlie Laetsch
        - Krishen Laetsch
      - Devendranath Capildeo (1938 – 2003) = Leila Capildeo (née Bissoondath)
        - Kavi Capildeo (1969 – ) = Ratna (Ratnawalie) Capildeo (née Byragie)
          - Tej Capildeo (2002 – )
          - Kovid Capildeo (2006 – )
        - Vahni Capildeo (1973 – ) = David Simon Groiser (marriage dissolved)
      - Surendranath Capildeo (1940 – 2016) = Shakti Capildeo (née Maraj)
        - Preeti Capildeo
        - Priya Capildeo
    - Rudranath Capildeo (1920 – 1970) = Ruth Capildeo (née Goodchild)
      - Rudy Capildeo = Sandra Capildeo (née Melough)
        - Jamie Capildeo = Nina Capildeo (née Goswami)
          - Tatiana Loveday Capildeo and Montague Cato Capildeo
      - Rudy Capildeo = Rita Lucia Capildeo (née Campolini)
        - Rudy Charles Capildeo
        - Lucy Capildeo
        - Joseph Capildeo
        - Oliver Capildeo
    - Rudranath Capildeo (1920 – 1970) = Shirley Capildeo (née Gasteen) (1933 – 2007)
      - Anne Saraswati Gasteen Macdonald (née Capildeo) = Ken Macdonald
        - Andrew Neil Gasteen Macdonald
        - Catherine Louise Capildeo Macdonald
    - Dhanpatee (a.k.a. Dhan/Dhanpat) Permanand (née Capildeo) = Ramnarine Permanand
      - Owad Permanand
        - Vijaya Permanand
        - Rajendra Permanand
        - Narendra Deva Permanand
        - Radha Permanand
        - Rishi Permanand
      - Sachedanand "Sash" Permanand = Jean Angela Permanand
    - Rajdaye (a.k.a. Rajpat) Maharaj (née Capildeo) (1900 – 1944) = Aiknath Ramcharan Maharaj (1896 – 1960)
    - Kalawatee (Calawattee) Capildeo = Ramnarace Permanand
      - Rabindranath "Robbie" Permanand
      - Baidwatie Permanand
      - Chitrawatie Permanand
      - Sawatee Permanand
    - Ahilla Capildeo
      - Deo
      - Phoolo
    - Beena Capildeo
    - Tara Capildeo = Pundit Hargobin
    - Kunti (Kunta) Capildeo = Pundit Baboo
      - Boysie
    - Ramdoolarie Capildeo = Dinanath (div.)
    - Bindmatee Capildeo = Satnarine Panday
    - Omkar Capildeo (died in infancy)
