= Monoculturalism =

Practice of actively preserving a culture to the exclusion of external influences

Monoculturalism is the policy or process of supporting, advocating, or allowing the expression of the culture of a single social or ethnic group. It generally stems from beliefs within the dominant group that their cultural practices are superior to those of minority groups and is often related to the concept of ethnocentrism, which involves evaluating another culture based on the values and standards of one's own culture. This is usually not the case when cultural nationalism is centered on civic integration, shared national institutions, and common citizenship rather than ethnic identity, as opposed to forms of ethno-nationalism that define national belonging primarily in ethnic or racial terms. Ethno-nationalism, as seen during the decline of the Weimar Republic and the rise of Nazi Germany, was associated with the weakening of constitutional safeguards, the capture of institutions by antisemitic and authoritarian movements, and the intimidation, exclusion, and silencing of those regarded as political, racial, or ideological opponents.

Rather than the suppression of different ethnic groups within a given society, sometimes monoculturalism manifests as the active preservation of a country's national culture via the exclusion of external influences. Japan, South Korea, and North Korea are examples of this form of monoculturalism. However it may also be the result of less intentional factors such as geographic isolation, historical racial homogeneity, or political isolation.

== Ethnocentric monoculturalism ==
Monoculturalism is often closely associated with ethnocentrism. Ethnocentrism is the practice of framing one's way of life as natural and valid, and applying that belief system to interpret the characteristics of other cultures.

=== In genocide ===
Many of the genocides practiced throughout history were based on ethnic supremacy. Ethnic supremacy is assumed by one group within a culture, following some distinct action by an external group or from one of the ethnic groups. With European intervention in places like Rwanda, social institutions worked to socially construct an ethnic inferiority, distinguishing the Hutus and Tutsis from one another and causing what would be one of the most horrific demonstrations of genocide in modern history.

A similar example to that of the Rwandan genocide was the ongoing civil war in Burma. The civil war spanned from a constitution that granted Burma their independence from the British Empire in which a group of leaders created conditions that did not involve many of Burma's ethnic minorities, and instigated a fight from them. Many of these ethnic minorities in Burma, including the Karen, have been significantly displaced by the military junta and placed into refugee camps in bordering nations. The remaining ethnic minorities have been living in poor conditions, and have been met by a variety of human rights abuses.

=== Globalization ===
Globalization involves the free movement of goods, capital, services, people, technology and information throughout the world. It also involves the international integration of potentially very different countries through the adoption of the same or similar worldviews, ideologies, and other aspects of culture. American academic Anthony J. Marsella argues that this is monoculturalism on a grand scale. Potentially it could lead to the suppression and loss of different ethnic cultures on a global scale.

== See also ==
- Criticism of multiculturalism
- Cultural diversity
- Cultural homogenization
- Monoethnicity
