= Langlands School and College =

- Chitral; Pakistan

Information
- Type: Private
- Motto: There is always room for improvement
- Opened: 1988
- Principal: Carey Schofield (since 2012)
- Enrollment: 1,000
- Website: langlandsschool.edu.pk

Langlands School and College, is located in Chitral, North-West Pakistan, and is formerly known as Sayurj Public School. The school educates about a thousand pupils, aged from four to eighteen, on four separate sites in and above the town of Chitral. More than a third of the pupils are girls, and the school has a record of academic excellence.

The school is registered with the Securities and Exchange Commission of Pakistan under the Societies Registration Act, 1860 as a non-profit institution. Although private, school fees are very low, even by local standards.

== History ==
=== Formation ===
Sayurj School (later Langlands School) was set up in September 1988 by Javed Majid, Deputy Commissioner of Chitral as a school for boys and girls aged five to ten years old. Juliette Seibold was the school's first principal until August 1989. In October 1989, a former British major Geoffrey D Langlands was appointed by Javed Majid as headmaster. He started his career as a teacher in mathematics in Croydon before World War II, had arrived in British India on a troop carrier in 1944, and remained when India and Pakistan became independent nations; first as an instructor for the young Pakistani army for six years; and from 1953 as a teacher at Aitchison College in Lahore. In 1979 he left Aitchison College for the post of headmaster of Cadet College Razmak, in North Waziristan, where he stayed until taking up the post in Chitral.

In 1989, the school had 80 pupils, from nursery school to Class 4, and six female teachers. The school grew quickly, with a new class added each year. In 1993 Langlands recruited the first male teachers, to teach science subjects. The teaching faculty is mixed with a majority of male teachers at senior level. Girls are taught separately in the senior school, but have access to all the school's facilities.

== Controversy ==
After having a stroke in 2008, the then 91-year-old Langlands contemplated retirement, and in September 2012 was replaced by 58-year-old British woman Carey Schofield, a foreign correspondent for London based newspapers for several decades and author of several books on military matters, among them Inside the Pakistan Army (2011).

During the last years of Langland's tenure, standards in the school declined. Upset that the new principal had updated the trustees on the need for reforms, Langlands persuaded the Minister of Interior, Chaudhary Nisar Ali Khan (an old Aitchison pupil) to block her visa. Mr Langlands attempted to seize control of the school and its bank accounts, pretending to be the owner and founder of the school.

The issue became public in Pakistan with questions raised in the Senate over Langland's behaviour. The Senate supported Schofield, as did the Governors and parents. The teachers of the school supported Schofield and travelled to Lahore to berate Langlands for his unseemly conduct.

Schofield returned to Chitral in January 2016 to take up the helm. In August 2026, still in post, she was awarded the Hilal-i-Quaid-i-Azam ("Crescent of Great Leader") by the Pakistani government for "services to Pakistan".
