= Abu Layth =

British Islamic scholar (born 1979)

Mufti Abu Layth
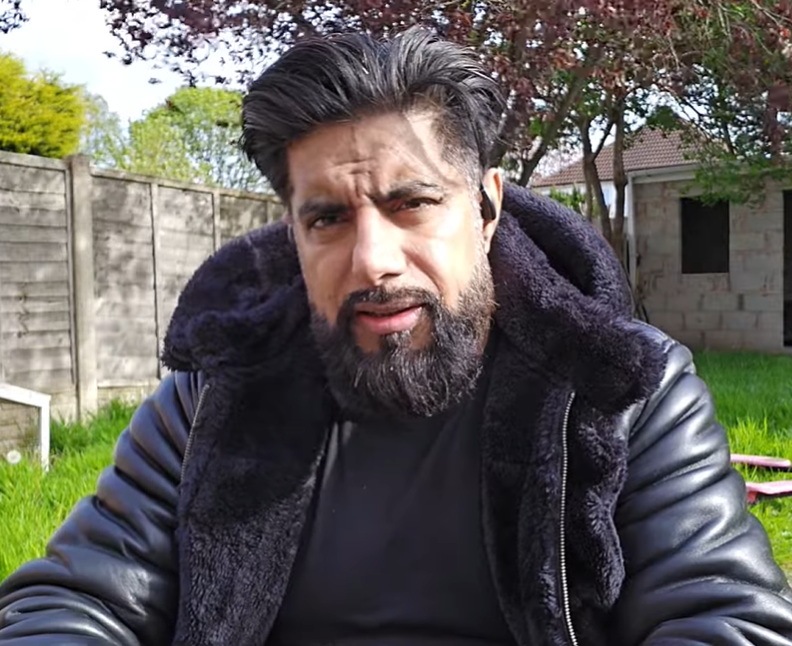
- Abu Layth in 2024

Personal life
- Born: Nahiem Ajmal c. 1979 (age 46–47)
- Education: Damascus University; Jamia Darul Uloom, Karachi
- Occupation: Islamic scholar; teacher

Religious life
- Religion: Islam
- Denomination: Sunni
- Movement: Progressive

YouTube information
- Channel: Mufti Abu Layth
- Years active: 2012–present
- Subscribers: 41 thousand
- Views: 13.42 million
- Last updated: 25 June 2024

Nahiem Ajmal (born c. 1979), commonly known by the kunya Abu Layth, is a British Islamic scholar. A Mufti, Ajmal is known for prioritizing reason and critical thinking and also for adopting an allegorical approach (Ta'wil) to Quranic exegesis. He's been the subject of criticism from puritanical Islamic scholars for many perceivedly heterodox views; and for his non-dogmatic engagement with Islamic thought, where he uses his platform to challenge clericalism, institutionalization, legalism, superstition, extremism, stagnated interpretations and rigid literalism within contemporary religious discourse.

== Early life and education ==
Ajmal was born in c. 1979 to a British Pakistani family. He begin Arabic and Islamic Studies as a teenager in the UK before travelling to Damascus, Syria in the late 90s to seek traditional Islamic scholarship. There, he adopted the Maliki madhhab, studying privately under young Maliki scholars of Moroccan, Algerian, and Tunisian backgrounds. It was with them that he studied basic Maliki Fiqh and Usul, alongside completing formal Islamic studies at Ma'had al-Amaniya and Damascus University.

He subsequently traveled to Pakistan to memorize the Quran and study Tafsir at Jami'ah Muhammadiyyah Institute in Islamabad. Following the completion of his studies in Islamabad he returned to Syria to recite the complete Qur'an to Shaykh Abdu'l-Haadi at-Tabbaa' (a senior student of Shaykh Bakri al-Tarabeeshi) to earn his ijazah.

After earning his ijazah in Damascus, Ajmal (once again) returned to Pakistan to complete the Dars-e-Nizami Alim course at Jami'ah Binnoria, Karachi — which one of the most respected traditional Islamic seminaries in Pakistan. There he studied Tafsir, Hadith, Usul, comparative Fiqh, Arabic literature and grammar, history, and Aqidah. In his final year (Dawrah Hadith), he completed the major classical Hadith collections (Muwatta, Bukhari, Muslim, Tirmidhi, Abu Dawud, Nasa'i, Ibn Majah, and Sharh Ma'ani al-Athar) with full authorization to teach them. He went on to complete the rigorous two-year Mufti Course at the same institute, specialising in comparative Fiqh, studying key texts such as the Mudawwanah, Radd al-Muhtar, Mawahib al-Jalil, Fawakih al-Dawwani, and al-Muwafaqat.

Returning to the UK in 2005, he pursued further formal education — qualifying as a teacher (PGCE), completing a Master's in Education (M.Ed), and later a B.Sc in Psychology — while teaching Arabic, Islamic Studies, and Religion & Philosophy at school and college level. He is based in Birmingham.

== Views ==
=== Jurisprudence ===
Despite a conservative education, Ajmal has been known to exercise critical thinking and adopt progressive positions as opposed to blindly adhering to conservative doctrine when deriving fiqh rulings, often satirizing mainstream positions. In particular, he is known for issuing fatawa (Islamic legal opinions) on social media where he has a large following.

=== Theology ===
Theologically, he does not align with literalist schools of thought that believe in anthropomorphism. He also adopts an allegorical approach towards the Quran's miracle stories. His hermeneutical approach is similar to that of other modernist scholars, in that laws were designed to reflect the day and age in which they came, and do not need to be the same in every era. In his sessions he also answers theological questions, such as, "Do we accept mutawatir hadith if they contradict the Qur'an?"

=== Politics ===
Ajmal was invited to the White House in recognition of his anti-terror work. He has also been described as a key figure locally in the UK's counter-extremism Prevent strategy. On 17 May 2021, Ajmal's house in Birmingham was invaded by a mob, accusing him of supporting Israel, which Ajmal denied.

== Criticism, controversy and legal issues ==
Abu Layth's views has caused criticism and denunciations. English Islamic scholar Muhammad Yasir al-Hanafi labelled him a dajjal ("deceiver") due to Ajmal's satirical approach and boldness in front of fundamentalist preachers. Others accuse him of "mocking the din" and have stated he has "no ghayra", with some criticising in particular his choice of topics in his live streams, especially when he covers topics with a rational point of view.

During the Park View School Trojan Horse scandal, Ajmal was a part-time tutor at the school. In a statement, the police revealed however that Ajmal was involved in Prevent. After this was revealed, Ajmal was promptly suspended by the school. The police's statement, Ajmal argued, had jeopardised his safety.

This is the Trojan Horse school, run by senior staff who were people of potential interest to the police. For obvious reasons I didn't tell them about my other works. It was grossly negligent to share such data on potential terrorists with them and it clearly compromised the people concerned for potential manipulation by groomers.

— Ajmal's statement quoted by the Telegraph

=== Criminal charges ===
In 2015, Ajmal asked an officer if he could access information to locate the woman who had fled her husband. He was thus charged with aiding and abetting misconduct in a public office and received a 6 month suspended sentence.

== Sources ==
- Ali, Rashad; Stuart, Hannah (2013). A Guide to Refuting Jihadism. London: Henry Jackson Society. ISBN 9781909035089.
- "Birmingham police officer sentenced for misconduct". BBC. 10 February 2015.
- "Teacher at 'Trojan Horse' school charged over extreme porn". Birmingham Mail. 29 May 2014.
- "Moment armed gang burst into Castle Bromwich home of imam as kids and family inside". Birmingham Mail. 18 May 2021.
- Brekke, Torkel; Larsen, Malik (2020). "Allah, Villa, Volvo: Muslim Professionals in the Nordic Countries and Their Financial Attitudes and Practices". Open Library of Humanities. 6 (2). doi:10.16995/olh.570. hdl:11250/3017887.
- Cartledge, James (10 February 2015). "Teacher who 'stopped kids joining Isis' is jailed over plot to track down jilted pal's wife". Birmingham Mail. Birmingham.
- Dalvi, Mohammed Subhan (2018). Fatawa and their development since the early Islamic era (PDF) (MRes). University of Wales Trinity Saint David.
- Gilligan, Andrew (15 February 2015). "Police chief investigated over Trojan horse school leak". The Daily Telegraph. London.
- Hussein, Dilly (15 May 2018). "Leaked audio recording reveals controversial "Mufti" Abu Layth using vile sexual profanities against critics". 5 Pillars. London.
- Kesvani, Hussein (2019). Follow me, Akhi: the online world of British Muslims. New York: Oxford University Press. ISBN 9781787381254.
- Oldham, Jeanette (29 May 2014). "Teacher at 'Trojan Horse' school charged over extreme porn". Birmingham Mail. Birmingham.
