= Beyond the Dragon's Mouth =

Beyond the Dragon's Mouth: Stories and Pieces is a collection of Shiva Naipaul's journalism and stories prefaced by a short memoir, published by Hamish Hamilton in 1984.

The first part consists of a short memoir in which Naipaul writes about his childhood in Trinidad, the Dragon's Mouth in the title referring to the curious shape of the harbour through which he would set sail for Britain and Oxford University.

The second part consists of his short stories, such as A Man of Mystery, set in Trinidad.

The last part showcases his engaging journalism, both at home in England and around the globe, from cities such as Bombay (including coverage of the death of Sanjay Gandhi), Tehran in the last days of the Shah, and being forced to stay sober during Ramadan in Marrakesh, as well as more rural areas such as Bihar.

His pieces on England are more personal than anything written about England by his more famous brother, the Nobel Laureate V S Naipaul, such as his account of enduring prejudice while looking for lodging in London during the 1960s. Living in Earl's Court was reproduced as part of an anthology of Black British Writing. Also included is his piece about Ugandan Asians relocating to a hostile Britain.
