= Ameer Faisal Alavi =

Pakistan army officer (1954–2008)

- General Alavi with General Bryan D. Brown

Personal details
- Born: Ameer Faisal Alavi; 28 March 1954 British Kenya
- Died: 19 November 2008 (aged 54) Islamabad, Pakistan
- Relations: Nadira Naipaul (sister); V. S. Naipaul (brother-in-law)
- Children: 2 daughters

Military service
- Allegiance: Pakistan
- Branch/service: Pakistan Army
- Years of service: 1974–2005
- Rank: Major General
- Unit: Army Armoured Corps (26th Cavalry)
- Commands: General Officer Commanding SSG
- Battles/wars: Kargil War; War in North-West Pakistan; Battle of Wana

Ameer Faisal Alavi (28 March 1954 – 19 November 2008) was a Pakistan Army two-star general and special operations expert who was the first General Officer Commanding (GOC) of the elite Special Service Group of Pakistan Army. A former member of Special Service Group, he was credited with masterminding the Angoor Ada operation in 2004, where many Arabs and Chechens based in the tribal areas were killed or arrested and turned over to the Americans.

Two months before his death, he threatened to expose two Pakistani army generals who had made deals with Taliban militants. He had given a copy of a letter he had sent to then Army Chief Ashfaq Parvez Kayani, to author Carey Schofield and told her to publish it if he was killed. The letter contained names of two generals. On 19 November 2008, while driving to work in his car in Islamabad, he was shot dead by three unknown gunmen. It was alleged that Ilyas Kashmiri, the chief of Jammu & Kashmir chapter of Harkat-ul-Jihad-al-Islami, was behind the murder of Maj-Gen Faisal Alavi at the behest of the Tehrik-i-Taliban Pakistan in North Waziristan.

== Early life ==
Alavi was born and raised in British Kenya, a British national. In 1966 at the age of 12, he moved to Pakistan to study at Abbottabad Public School where he studied from 1966 to 1971. Out of his love and zeal for the military he renounced his British nationality. He got his Pakistani citizenship when he wrote to then President of Pakistan Zulfikar Ali Bhutto to be granted citizenship in order to be able to join the Pakistan Army. He thus renounced his British nationality to join Pakistan Army. He was commissioned in the 49th PMA Long Course in 1974 in the 26th Cavalry Regiment of the Armoured Corps.

== Family ==
Maj Gen Alavi has two daughters who live in with their mother but at the time of his death they were both in USA. His sister Nadira Naipaul is a former journalist and widow of British-Trinidadian novelist and Nobel laureate V. S. Naipaul. At the time of his death, Alavi was living with his wife in Bahria Town, Rawalpindi.

== Commander SSG and forced retirement ==
Alavi was promoted to major general in January 2003 and assigned as the first General Officer Commanding (GOC) of Special Service Group (SSG). This post was upgraded from brigadier-general to major-general level post. He was also the first Pakistan Army officer who captained the Armed Forces Skydiving Team (AFST) as a General Officer on 23 March 2005. While serving as the SSG GOC, Major General Alavi spearheaded an operation against the Taliban in Pakistan's North-West Frontier Province, the first-ever Army operation in North Waziristan in 2004.

In August 2005, however, he was sacked by General Pervez Musharraf from his post as head of Pakistan's Special Service Group (SSG), for "conduct unbecoming." Carey Schofield, writing for the British newspaper The Sunday Times, reported that there was a plot by Major General Faisal Alavi's enemies using an affair with a divorced Pakistani woman to discredit him. While having a conversation with his colleagues he was challenged on the issue, Faisal Alavi made a remark considered disrespectful to General Pervez Musharraf, then the president. Some of his enemies played the recording of this conversation to General Musharraf and Faisal Alavi was sacked.

== Post-retirement years ==
After his retirement he worked as CEO and executive director of REDtone Telecommunication Pakistan Ltd, a privately held telecommunications company in Pakistan.

He however, continued to make efforts to clear his name from the allegations made against him that lead to his sacking. He wanted his honour to be restored and to be given then Hilal-e-Imtiaz (Military) or the Crescent of Excellence, a medal he would have been given had he not been dismissed.

== Assassination ==
On 19 November 2008, while driving to work in his car, he was shot dead by three unknown gunmen on Islamabad Highway near the PWD Colony in the Koral police precincts, close to his home in Bahria Town.

Earlier on 21 July 2008, General Faisal Alavi had sent a letter to the chief of Pakistan Army, General Ashfaq Parvez Kayani, requesting to restore his benefits and suggesting that two army general officers had plotted to get him expelled from the army because they wanted to hide their involvement in "a matter he was privy to". He had threatened to expose Pakistani army generals who he believed had made deals with Taliban militants and warned that he would "furnish all relevant proof."

In October 2008, risking his life, he gave a copy of this letter to Carey Schofield in Talkingfish Islamabad restaurant which was also his favorite. When he did not get a reply from General Kayani he was concerned for his life and mentioned that to Schofield in a conversation, "It hasn't worked, They'll shoot me."

Four days after his conversation with the British journalist while he was driving through Islamabad his car was halted by another vehicle and the gunmen opened fire from either side. He was shot eight times. His driver was also killed. The gunmen had used 9 mm pistols, a standard army issue, and the killings were believed to be "far more clinical than a normal militant attack" giving rise to speculation of involvement of Pakistani Army personnel in the murder.

=== Revelations to Carey Schofield and British SAS ===
In August 2005 while visiting Hereford, the home of the Special Air Service (SAS) he was keen to revive the SSG's relationship with British special forces and expressed unhappiness about the way some elements of Pakistan's army were behaving. He wanted kit, skills and training from the UK for the SSG. When he was bluntly asked by an SAS officer why the Pakistani army should be given all this help if nothing came of it in terms of getting the Al-Qaeda leadership, he replied "he knew that Pakistan was not pulling its weight in the war on terror."

He told Carey Schofield how one general had done a deal with Baitullah Mehsud, the 35-year-old Taliban leader. Mehsud, was the main suspect in the assassination of Benazir Bhutto in 2007. He was also believed to have been behind a plot to bomb transport networks in several European countries including Britain, which came to light when 14 alleged conspirators were arrested in Barcelona. He revealed that a senior Pakistani general came to an arrangement with Mehsud "whereby – in return for a large sum of money – Mehsud's 3,000 armed fighters would not attack the army."

Carey Schofield later reported that Faisal Alavi had suggested that two senior generals named in Faisal Alavi's letter to Kayani were in effect complicit in giving the militants free rein in return for refraining from attacks on the Pakistani army.

=== Role of Ilyas Kashmiri ===
The editorial in Daily Times claimed that Maj (Retd) Haroon Ashiq was the assassin of Maj-Gen Faisal Alavi "for Rs 150,000 given him by [Ilyas] Kashmiri." This was consistent with Interior Minister Rehman Malik's statement on television in August 2009 that "officers of the rank of major" in the intelligence agencies with links with the Taliban and Al-Qaeda had been arrested "because they wanted to target army generals."

Ilyas Kashmiri was reportedly killed in a US drone attack in Waziristan on 7 September 2009, but survived and remains at large. He had reorganized 313 Brigade in North Waziristan (it was earlier active in Kashmir before 9/11) that was responsible for carrying out multiple terrorist attacks throughout the country. Earlier Kashmiri was arrested after the twin attacks on President General Pervez Musharraf in December 2003, but was later released in February 2004 at the insistence of United Jihad Council led by Sayeed Salahudeen.

== Funeral ==
He was buried at the army graveyard in Rawalpindi a few days after his assassination. Soldiers had come from across Pakistan to bury the general with military honours. Wreaths were laid on behalf of Kayani and most of the country's military leadership.

After his death he was described by his daughter to a Pakistani newspaper as an "easy going, humble, compassionate, but very fearless" person.
