= Seepersad Naipaul =

Trinidadian writer (1906–1953)

- Naipaul in 1935
- Born: Supersad Nyepal; 14 April 1906; Cunupia, Caroni County, Trinidad and Tobago
- Died: 3 October 1953 (aged 47); Port of Spain, Saint George County, Trinidad and Tobago
- Other names: Seepersad Naipal, Bholah Supersad
- Citizenship: British
- Occupations: Journalist and author
- Spouse: Droapatie Capildeo (m. 1929)
- Children: 7, including V. S., Savi, and Shiva
- Relatives: Nadira Naipaul (daughter-in-law); Capildeo family (in-laws)
- Writing career
- Language: English and Hindustani
- Years active: 1929–1953
- Notable work: The Adventures of Gurudeva

Seepersad Naipaul (/ˈnaɪpɔːl, naɪˈpɔːl/; né Supersad Nyepal; 14 April 1906–3 October 1953) was a Trinidadian writer. He was the father of writers V. S. Naipaul, Shiva Naipaul, and Savi Naipaul Akal, and married into the influential Indo-Trinidadian Capildeo family. Mohun Biswas, the title character of his son's novel, A House for Mr Biswas, is based on him and his life.

== Early life ==
Naipaul was born 14 April 1906 to Phoolkareah and Nyepal. Nyepal was a Brahmin who was born in India and immigrated with his mother under the Indian indenture system and Phoolkareah was born to a father from Patna in Bihar, India. They were a poor Hindu Indian family in Cunupia in rural central Trinidad. Naipaul largely educated himself. Sent to live with extended family, he would help rear goats and cows in the mornings, and then walk to school without shoes. He was only allowed to attend primary school; his brother was sent to work in the cane fields for 8 cents a day, while his sister remained illiterate.

Though Naipaul was only in school a few years, he taught himself to read and write, and wished to become a writer. His role models were O. Henry and William Somerset Maugham.

He was married to Droapatie Capildeo of the Capildeo family in 1929 in Chaguanas. They had seven children, including V. S. Naipaul, Savi Naipaul Akal, and Shiva Naipaul.

== Career ==
Despite his limited formal education, Naipaul became the Central correspondent for the Trinidad Guardian, where he was the paper's first Indo-Trinidadian journalist. He was hired as part of an attempt to modernise the T&T Guardian, which was primarily read by the white urban elite at the time.

Naipaul's journalism was noted for his acute observations of Trinidadian society and his prose, which "boldly creolised reporting styles and showed his sons the possibilities of combining fiction and non-fiction". Professor Aaron Eastley, of Brigham Young University in Utah, describes Naipaul's as "a voice that was creative, often sensational, and certainly dramatic". Guardian sales reportedly rose during his employ.

=== Gurudeva and Other Indian Tales (1943) ===
Naipaul's first book, Gurudeva and Other Indian Tales, is a collection of linked short stories that was first published in Trinidad and Tobago in 1943. Like most Caribbean writers at the time, Naipaul had to self-publish. Only 1000 copies of the pamphlet were published and it became highly sought after.

The elder Naipaul wanted his son V. S. Naipaul (or "Vido", as he called him) to try to get his short story collection published in London, hoping any money it earned would help the family escape from poverty in Trinidad. After he had a heart attack, his daughter Kamla also wrote to Vidia, urging him to send an encouraging letter to their father and to demand he find a publisher for the book to save Seepersad's life. The book would not be published in London for two more decades.

In 1976, 23 years after the elder Naipaul's death, the collection was re-edited and republished as The Adventures of Gurudeva, and Other Stories (Andre Deutsch). V. S. Naipaul opted to omit some stories for this second edition, including a story in which his father satirised himself through a character called Gopi. According to publisher and Caribbean scholar Jeremy Poynting, V. S. declined the option to republish the book a second time.

Despite its limited time in print, Gurudeva and Other Indian Tales has been called "a landmark in Indian diasporic fiction" by N. Jayaram and "a book of rare quality" by Patrick French.

Though out of print for several decades, Gurudeva and Other Indian Tales is due to be republished in 2025, as part of Peepal Tree Press' Caribbean Modern Classics series. The new edition will include new stories, originally broadcast on the BBC World Service's Caribbean Voices programme or published in Caribbean periodicals, as well as those stories removed from the 1976 second edition.

=== Between Father and Son: Family Letters (1999) ===
Letters from Seepersad Naipaul are featured in Between Father and Son: Family Letters (edited by Gillon Aitken), which collects correspondence between V. S. Naipaul and his family, dating from around the time Vidia won a scholarship to Oxford University until after the older Naipaul's death. The book was published in 1999, and extracted in The New Yorker.

In a review of the book, James Woods notes Seepersad Naipaul's dedication to his seven children and the combination of humour and pathos in his letters. Though the elder Naipaul describes feeling "trapped" in his day job, which does not let him write as much as he would like, he takes joy in his son's accomplishments.

=== Seepersad Naipaul, Amazing Scenes: Selected Journalism 1928–1953 (2024) ===
Edited by Aaron Eastley, Brinsley Samaroo, Kenneth Ramchand and Nivedita Misra, Seepersad Naipaul, Amazing Scenes: Selected Journalism 1928–1953 (Leeds: Peepal Tree Press, 2024) covers 25 years of Naipaul's columns and articles in the T&T Guardian. Naipaul was initially charged with reporting on the lives of the East Indians on the island. The articles often reflect on topical issues of the day but are notable for their humour.

The incidents described in book often highlight the parallels between the elder Naipaul's career in journalism and V. S. Naipaul's character of Mohan Biswas in his novel A House for Mr Biswas. It also includes Naipaul's writings on the infamous "Kali cult" incident.

==== "Kali cult" incident ====
In one article, written in 1933, Naipaul describes a rabies epidemic infecting local animals and the superstitious owners who, rather than vaccinate their animals, sacrifice them to avoid "the wrath of Kali". Shortly after, he receives a threatening letter. The letter warns him of a deadly curse, which can only be undone if he sacrifices a goat to Kali Mai. He initially responds with humour, when he writes: "Briefly and explicitly, I say bunkum."

Despite this initial flippancy, Naipaul was eventually persuaded by his friends and family to perform the sacrifice of a goat in 1933. He was reportedly distressed that he had been forced to do something he did not believe in and, according to his son V. S. Naipaul and others, this triggered a mental breakdown a few months later.

== Death ==
On 2 February 1953, after their father had a heart attack, Kamla Naipaul wrote to her brother Vidia, who was still in Oxford. She demanded that, in order to save their father's life and the lives of their siblings, he send an encouraging letter to Seepersad urgently, and that he find a London publisher for The Adventures of Gurudeva, and Other Stories.

Seepersad Naipaul hoped the sale of his book would alleviate the family's financial difficulties at the time. In response, V. S. sent a letter discussing author Joyce Cary, who found success in his late 40s. Unfortunately, the elder Naipaul died of a heart attack on 3 October that year, aged just 46. The Adventures of Gurudeva was not republished until 1976.

== Legacy ==
Though Naipaul died before seeing The Adventures of Gurudeva republished, his work is now highly regarded. At Oxford, V. S. Naipaul's mentor Peter Bayley argued that the book inspired Vidia's first four novels: "I found there The Mystic Masseur, The Suffrage of Elvira and of course quite a lot of Miguel Street and indeed anticipations of Mr Biswas." Writing in the T&T Guardian, Shereen Ali noted that the "older, more sympathetic Naipaul" also used many of the features lauded in the work of V. S. "a generation before his son did".

According to V. S. Naipaul, Seepersad's career as a writer showed his sons "an example of labour" which would influence their own careers. V. S. Naipaul wrote in his autobiography that "the ambition to be a writer was given me by my father" and that The Adventures of Gurudeva served as his own "private epic" until it was republished. Seepersad Naipaul's own career in journalism inspired the titular character from A House for Mr Biswas.

Reflecting on his childhood, V. S. Naipaul wrote, "There was a big ledger in which my father had pasted his early writings...This ledger became one of the books of my childhood. It was there, in the old-fashioned Guardian type and layout...that I got to love the idea of newspapers and the idea of print." His father would read books aloud at home, including Shakespeare, Charles Dickens, H.G. Wells, Jonathan Swift and Charles Kingsley. Vidia was particularly inspired by his father reading from Booker T. Washington's Up From Slavery.

Aaron Eastley has also argued that Seepersad Naipaul's writing influenced other local writers to express themselves. Naipaul's journalism spanned hundreds of articles over 25 years. Although some of his journalism was not written under his name, the characteristic language he used was enough to identify much of it through lexical stylometry.

=== Naipaul House and Literary Museum ===
By 1946, though supporting a wife and seven children on a journalist's salary, Naipaul achieved the feat of purchasing 26 Nepaul Street, a modest but decent detached house which inspired the book A House for Mr Biswas by V. S. Naipaul and The Naipauls of Nepaul Street by his sister, Savi Naipaul Akal.

In 2000, an act of Parliament established the Friends of Mr Biswas, an organisation led by Professor Kenneth Ramchand, to manage the property. As a result, the Government of Trinidad and Tobago bought and restored 26 Nepaul Street in 2002 — a year after V. S. Naipaul won the Nobel Prize in Literature.

In 2006, the Government granted a 99-year lease to the Friends of Mr Biswas to operate and develop a museum of the Naipaul family at the property now known as Naipaul House. Between 2008 and 2010, the house was fully restored to match the descriptions given in A House for Mr Biswas, including the addition of recognisable items from the book, such as the yellow typewriter, dining table, hatrack, and bookcase.

As well as running Naipaul House and Literary Museum, the Friends of Mr Biswas also works to support and promote Trinbagonian writers through its ongoing programme of activities.

=== The Naipauls of Nepaul Street ===
In 2018, Savi Naipaul Akal published her memoir, The Naipauls of Nepaul Street (Leeds: Peepal Tree Press). The book explores family life at Naipaul House, including the sacrifices made by Seepersad Naipaul and his wife, Droapatie, to raise their seven children.

The book explores Savi's relationship with her father and the stories he told his children — including his firm belief that the family would improve its means through writing — but also offers additional context about the women of the family and their role in shaping its legacy. For example, she explains how her mother coped with her father's early death, succeeding in sending all seven children to university (including all five daughters), and how she and Seepersad imparted a sense of independence in the girls from a young age.

Akal has also explained how much of her brother V. S. Naipaul's research involved savage "interrogations" of Droapatie, because she had so much knowledge of the family and its history. It was also their mother, Akal explains, who managed the family's finances through both Seepersad's and V. S.'s attempts to launch literary careers.

The book also details the family estrangements and emigrations, including V. S. Naipaul's move to Oxford. Akal writes of the reason so many Naipauls moved away, and the impact of this emigration on the family, as well as the impact of a second premature death — that of her brother, Shiva Naipaul.

=== Seepersad and Sons: Naipaulian Synergies ===
In 2009, Aaron Eastley of Brigham Young University, Utah, met Kenneth Ramchand of the University of the West Indies (UWI) at St. Augustine, Trinidad. Eastley had been collecting Seepersad Naipaul's articles in the T&T Guardian, while Ramchand had been collecting his short stories. They decided to work together.

In 2015, based on their shared interest in the elder Naipaul, Eastley, Ramchand and others presented a three-day conference, Seepersad and Sons: Naipaulian Creative Synergies with the UWI Department of Literary, Cultural and Communication Studies and the National Archives of Trinidad and Tobago. This later developed into the anthology Seepersad and Sons: Naipaulian Synergies, published by Peepal Tree Press in 2019. Contributors to the anthology include Eastley, Ramchand, J. Vijay Maharaj, Nicholas Laughlin, Arnold Rampersad, Andre Bagoo, Sharon Millar, Keith Jardim, Raymond Ramcharitar, and others.

== Bibliography ==
- Gurudeva and Other Indian Tales (1943, republished in 1976 as The Adventures of Gurudeva), reissue forthcoming by Peepal Tree Press, 2025 ISBN 978-1-84523-554-3
- Seepersad Naipaul, Amazing Scenes: Selected Journalism 1928-1953, edited by Aaron Eastley, Brinsley Samaroo, Kenneth Ramchand and Nivedita Misra (Leeds: Peepal Tree Press, 2024) ISBN 978-1-84523-563-5
