= A House for Mr Biswas =

1961 novel by V. S. Naipaul

- First edition cover
- Author: V. S. Naipaul
- Cover artist: Stephen Russ
- Language: English
- Genre: Contemporary fiction
- Published: 1961; 65 years ago
- Publisher: André Deutsch
- Publication place: United Kingdom
- Media type: Print

A House for Mr Biswas is a 1961 novel by V. S. Naipaul, significant as Naipaul's first work to achieve acclaim worldwide. It is the story of Mohun Biswas, a Hindu Indo-Trinidadian who continually strives for success and mostly fails, who marries into the influential Tulsi family only to find himself dominated by it, and who finally sets the goal of owning his own house. It relies on some biographical elements from the experience of the author's father.

In 1998, the Modern Library ranked A House for Mr Biswas number 72 on its list of the 100 best English-language novels of the 20th century. Time magazine included the novel in its list of the 100 best English-language novels from 1923 to 2005. In 2022, it was included on the "Big Jubilee Read" list of 70 books by Commonwealth authors, selected to celebrate the Platinum Jubilee of Elizabeth II.

== Synopsis ==
=== Plot ===
Mohun Biswas (based on V. S. Naipaul's father, Seepersad Naipaul) is born in rural Trinidad and Tobago to Hindu Indian parents. His father is a Brahmin. His birth was considered inauspicious as he is born "in the wrong way" and with an extra finger. A pundit prophesies that the newborn child "will be a lecher and a spendthrift. Possibly a liar as well", and that he will "eat up his mother and father". The pundit advises that the boy be kept "away from trees and water. Particularly water". A few years later, Mohun leads a neighbour's calf, which he is tending, to a stream. The boy, who has never seen water "in its natural form", becomes distracted and allows the calf to wander off. Mohun then hides in fear of punishment. His father, believing his son to be in the water, drowns in an attempt to save him, thus in part fulfilling the pundit's prophecy. The family breaks up as a result of this. Mohun's sister is transferred to live with Tara and Ajodha, a well-off aunt and uncle. Mohun moves in with other family members along with his mother and two elder brothers.

The boy is withdrawn prematurely from school and apprenticed to a pundit, but is cast out on bad terms. Ajodha then puts him in the care of his alcoholic and abusive brother Bhandat, an arrangement which also ends badly. Finally, the young Mr Biswas decides to make his own fortune. He encounters a friend from his school days who helps him get into the business of sign-writing. While on the job, Mr Biswas attempts to romance a client's daughter but his advances are misinterpreted as a wedding proposal. He is drawn into a marriage which he does not have the nerve to stop and becomes a member of the Tulsi household.

Mr Biswas becomes very unhappy with his wife Shama (based on Droapatie Naipaul) and her overbearing family. The Tulsis (based on the Capildeo family), and the big decaying Hanuman House (based on Anand Bhavan aka the Lion House) where they live represent the communal way of life which is traditional throughout Asia. Mr Biswas is offered a place in this cosmos, a subordinate place to be sure, but a place that is guaranteed and from which advancement is possible. But Mr Biswas wants more than being just a gharjamai. He is, by instinct, a modern man. He wants to be the author of his own life. That is an aspiration with which the Tulsis cannot deal, and their decaying world conspires to drag him down. Despite his poor education, Mr Biswas becomes a journalist, has four children with Shama, and attempts several times to build a house that he can call his own, a house which will symbolise his independence. Mr Biswas' desperate struggle to acquire a house of his own can be linked to an individual's need to develop an authentic identity. He feels that only by having his own house he can overcome his feelings of rootlessness and alienation.

=== Characters ===
- Mohun Biswas (based on V. S. Naipaul's father, Seepersad Naipaul)
- Shama (based on Droapatie Naipaul), Mohun's wife
- Bipti, Mohun's mother
- Raghu, Mohun's father
- Pratap,Elder brother of Mohun
- Prasad, brother of Mohun
- Dehuti, Sister of Mohun
- Tara, Mohun's mother's sister
- Ajodha, Tara's husband.
- Bhandat, Tara's brother-in-law
- Pundit Jayaram, Mohun's cruel employer, with whom he worked as an assistant
- Mrs. Tulsi, Shama's mother
- Padma, Mrs.Tulsi's sister
- Seth, Padma's husband.
- Savi, Mohun's daughter.
- Anand, Mohun's son (based on V. S. Naipaul). Anand excels in school and shows signs of talent as a writer.

== Development and publication ==
Naipaul wrote the book based on his own experiences as a child. Writing for The New York Review of Books in 1983, he stated that, "Of all my books A House for Mr. Biswas is the one closest to me." The book took him three years to write.

Naipaul finished the final proofreading of the book in May 1961. The book was first published in London by André Deutsch in 1961. McGraw Hill published the first US edition of the book in New York in the same year.

== Style and themes ==
A central theme of the novel is alienation. Right from his birth, Mr Biswas is alienated due to the prophecy. He grew up as a lonely child who lived in isolation. Following his marriage to Shama, the joint family of the Tulsis expected him to merge his personal identity with theirs, which he finds difficult and makes him feel trapped. They later humiliate him and he is forced to work at the estate at Green Vale, where he grows resentful of even his own children. Ultimately, this sense of alienation motivates him to search for a house, symbolising an effort to find and create his own identity.

Throughout the novel, Mr Biswas' gradual progress is indicated through the many objects he and his wife acquire over the years. Naipaul lists out detailed inventories, much like "the catalogue of ships in the Iliad or the many descriptions of rooms by Dickens".

== Legacy ==
The novel is generally regarded as Naipaul's most significant work and is credited with launching him into international fame and renown.

Time magazine included the novel in its "All-Time 100 Novels". On 5 November 2019, BBC News listed A House for Mr Biswas on its list of the 100 most influential novels.

== Adaptations ==
The novel was later adapted as a stage musical (unproduced), with compositions by Monty Norman. One of the songs written for the play, "Good Sign, Bad Sign", was later rewritten as the "James Bond Theme", according to the documentary Inside Dr. No.

In 1980, the book was serialised by the BBC in England as part of A Book at Bedtime and broadcast on the BBC World Service in 1981.

A two-part radio dramatisation, featuring Rudolph Walker, Nitin Ganatra, Nina Wadia and Angela Wynter, ran on BBC Radio Four on 26 March and 2 April 2006.
