= Multiculturalism and Islam =

The relationship between multiculturalism and Islam is an important aspect in the overall debate on the soundness of the modern doctrine of multiculturalism.

== Backlash against multicultural policies ==
In an article in the Hudson Review, Bruce Bawer writes about what he sees as a developing distaste toward the idea and policies of multiculturalism in Western Europe, especially in the Netherlands, Denmark, the United Kingdom, Norway, Sweden, Austria and Germany. The belief behind this backlash on multiculturalism is that it creates friction within society.

== Incompatibility with secular society ==
Incompatibility with secular society has been influenced by a stance against multiculturalism advocated by recent philosophers, closely linked to the heritage of New Philosophers. Fiery polemic on the subject by proponents like Pascal Bruckner and Paul Cliteur has kindled international debate.

== Introduction of sharia in Western countries ==
In Canada, the possible introduction of sharia family courts became a contentious issue, and received much media attention. In the UK, London is far more segregated on religious grounds than by race; 25% of London's seven million residents live in religiously segregated neighbourhoods.

== Suspicion towards Muslims ==
A survey showed that 18% in Britain think that "a large proportion of British Muslims feel no sense of loyalty to this country and are prepared to condone or even carry out acts of terrorism". A 2026 study conducted by British Future and the British Muslim Trust showed that 17% of Britons “strongly agree” that “the growth in the Muslim population poses a foundational threat to UK culture”.

== See also ==
- Multiculturalism
- Islam
- 73 Sects (Hadith)
- Perennial philosophy
- Omnism
- Interspirituality
- Liberalism and progressivism within Islam
- Religious pluralism
- Religious exclusivism
- Religious discrimination
- Religious intolerance
- Religious persecution
- Religious violence
- Religious fanaticism
- Sectarian violence
