= An Unfinished Journey (book) =

1986 essay collection by Shiva Naipaul

- Title page for An Unfinished Journey (1986)
- Author: Shiva Naipaul
- Genre: Essays
- Publisher: Hamish Hamilton
- Publication date: 1986
- Publication place: United Kingdom

An Unfinished Journey is a collection of essays by Shiva Naipaul, posthumously published by Hamish Hamilton in 1986.

The foreword is by the author's father-in-law, Douglas Stuart, who in a short biographical sketch of the author describes him as a writer who gained in discipline but was painfully slow, even at times spending an entire afternoon trying to finish a sentence. He also asked Shiva Naipaul why he had lost the comic tone in his writing, and wrote that Naipaul attributed it to the arresting horror of witnessing the aftermath of the Jonestown Massacre, part of his research for the book Black & White (1980).

The essays in An Unfinished Journey are in part autobiographical, such as those on Naipaul's relationship with his brother V. S. Naipaul, and his experiences in Australia and other countries. The titular essay is the beginning of an unfinished (due to death) travel book about South East Asia. Also included is an essay called "The Illusion of the Third World", originally commissioned by Channel 4 Television.
