= Selling Illusions =

Selling Illusions: The Cult of Multiculturalism in Canada
- First edition
- Author: Neil Bissoondath
- Language: English
- Publisher: Penguin Group
- Publication place: Canada
- Pages: 272
- ISBN: 978-0-14-100676-5

Selling Illusions: The Cult of Multiculturalism in Canada is a non-fiction book by Canadian author Neil Bissoondath, first published in 1994. The book puts forward an assessment of Canada's Multiculturalism Act (1988) and how the bi-cultural nature of the country is to be willfully refashioned into a multicultural "mosaic". Bissoondath argues that the policy of multiculturalism, with its emphasis on the former or ancestral homeland and its insistence that "there is more important than Here", discourages the full loyalty of Canada's citizens.

The book won the Writers' Trust of Canada's Gordon Montador Award in 1995.
