= Hal Bevan-Petman =

British painter (1894–1980)

- Born: Henry Charles Bevan-Petman; 28 October 1894; Barton Regis Rural District, Gloucestershire, England
- Died: 9 May 1980 (aged 85); Rawalpindi, Pakistan
- Resting place: Christian Cemetery, Rawalpindi, Pakistan; 33.343759°N 73.25511°E
- Education: Slade School of Fine Art
- Known for: Painting, Drawing

Henry Charles 'Hal' Bevan-Petman (1894–1980) was a British painter, who made a career in British India and Pakistan. He stayed through during the Partition of India and chose to reside in Pakistan, till his death on 9 May 1980 in Rawalpindi. He painted significant civil and military personalities, landscapes and still life. His works included many Pakistan Army officers, two of whom became Pakistan's Heads of State: Field Marshal Ayub Khan and General Yahya Khan. He is buried in the Christian Graveyard in Rawalpindi, Pakistan.

== Early life ==
Born in Barton Regis Rural District, Gloucestershire, England on 28 October 1894, to Bertram Amor Bevan-Petman (1870–1931) and Maria Minnie Bevan Petman (1869–1942), his family was of Anglo-Indian ancestry, and included prominent lawyers and judges who served at various eminent positions during the British Raj. He was educated at Clifton College, Bristol "Clifton College Register" Muirhead, J.A.O. p288: Bristol; J.W Arrowsmith for Old Cliftonian Society; April 1948 from 1908 to 1910 and resided through this period at North Town Boys House; and played cricket for the Clifton College XI at Lord's against Tonbridge in 1914.

Bevan-Petman subsequently applied to and was accepted by Slade School of Fine Art in 1914, and received a two-year scholarship amounting to £35. This scholarship was then renewed in 1916. During this scholastic period he received the First Prize for Figure Painting and Figure Drawing. Furthermore, he was awarded certificates in Perspective, History of Art, Figure Drawing, and satisfied the requirements for a Diploma in Fine Art in History of Art (Painting in Spain and the Netherlands). He graduated from Slade School of Art in 1917 after being awarded a certificate in 'Painting from Life'.

== Career beginnings ==
As a young artist in 1920s London, he painted models who came to be known as 'The Petman Girls', serialised in The Illustrated London News, The Sketch and Bystander. The drawings were considered risque in a prudish post-Edwardian era, and could be considered as precursors to the modern 'Page 3 Girls' of The Sun Newspaper of today.

== Personal life ==
Records show that Hal Bevan-Petman married three times to:

- Ms. Frances Slough (an artists model), whom he married on 25 April 1917 to 1923 producing one offspring named Minnie Frances Duncan.
- Ms. Gabrielle Hunter from 1927 to 1935 No offspring is reported.
- Ms. Beryl Dyer (a former dance hall hostess at Standards & Stifles), Lahore. They married in 1940 at Naulakha Church, Lahore. No offspring is reported. She lived many years, later after his death, in Abbottabad, Pakistan On her death she was also buried next to him in Rawalpindi.

== Pre-partition British India ==
Hal Bevan-Petman painted many landscapes during this era and on one occasion was commissioned by the India Tourism Office for a 'See India' poster. The mountain ranges of Kashmir appear frequently in his landscapes and are considered rare.

During this time, he also taught a young Amrita Sher-Gil (1913–1941), who went on to become a talented Indian painter.

He also had clients from Indian Royalty for whom he did portraits and the occasional risque renditions. This included the Nawab of Bahawalpur, who corresponded with Hal on a regular basis. Such commissions have remained very private, elusive and very rarely displayed.

== Post-Partition Pakistan ==
During his time in Pakistan he painted practically every notable personality and/or their spouses, ranging from Mohammad Ali Jinnah, the founder of Pakistan, various subsequent presidents and Military Commanders. He was commissioned to paint military battle scenes which adorn the walls of various Pakistani Military Academic Institutions. He also painted several war heroes who were decorated posthumously with the Nishan-e-Haider, Pakistan's highest military award. One of the most celebrated amongst them is Major Raja Aziz Bhatti.

== Death ==
He died on 9 May 1980 and is buried in the Rawalpindi Christian Cemetery flanked by the graves of his wife Beryl and sister-in-law, Eve Strauss née Dyer respectively.

== Art ==
He is known to have built a considerable reputation in the art scene and was commissioned by the Pakistan Army to paint many Generals, Commanders and Battle Scenes. Most of the portraits are held in Private Collections, and many adorn various Pakistan Army's Educational Institutions, Messes and Regimental Headquarters. The Ladies portraits of various socialites and influential personalities are considered romanticised renditions with almost hazily surreal backgrounds. Queen Elizabeth II was presented four paintings by the Government of Pakistan in 1961. These paintings are on display at Sandringham House and are part of the Royal Collection.

According to Chris Cork, who in his article remarked, "He was a quick painter, three or four sittings and the work was done. Looking at his pictures today they are almost ephemeral. Not for him the heavy brushstroke but instead a hint of a smile, a slightly raised and querulent eyebrow and those Petman eyes, all so different but identifiably Petman eyes no matter who they belonged to in the first place."

== Documentary ==
A documentary, directed by Taqi Shaheen, was premiered at Kuch Khaas on 4 September 2012, receiving positive reviews, later featuring in 'Migration Stories', a British Council Pakistan roadshow in 2013.
