= The Chip-Chip Gatherers =

1973 novel by Shiva Naipaul

First edition

The Chip-Chip Gatherers is a novel by Shiva Naipaul originally published in 1973 by Andre Deutsch. It was reprinted in a new edition as a Penguin Twentieth Century Classic in 1997. It is a comic story following a cast of colourful Hindu and Muslim characters of Indian descent in a large village in Trinidad. It won the Whitbread Award.
