= Nadira Naipaul =

Pakistani journalist

Nadira, Lady Naipaul (born Nadira Khannum Alvi; 1953) is a Kenyan-born British Pakistani journalist and the widow of novelist Sir V. S. Naipaul.

== Early life ==
Naipaul was born in Mombasa, Kenya to two Pakistani immigrants to the country.

== Journalism career ==
Naipaul worked as a columnist for The Nation, a Pakistani newspaper where she published a weekly column titled Letter from Bahawalpur. In his 1998 book Sir Vidia's Shadow: A Friendship Across Five Continents, Paul Theroux described Naipaul's columns as "lovable, ungrammatical, clumsy, audacious."

In 2003, Naipaul received media attention for asking then-Deputy Prime Minister of India L. K. Advani to comment on India's commitment to secularism, following the 2002 Gujarat violence while attending the first Pravasi Bharatiya Divas.

In 2009, Naipaul wrote opinion articles for the Mail on Sunday and The Evening Standard decrying the actions of the Taliban in Swat Valley. In these articles Naipaul shared the details of the 2008 assassination of her brother, Ameer Faisal Alavi, a two-star general in the Pakistan Army.

In 2010, Winnie Madikizela-Mandela granted an interview to Naipaul which was published in The Evening Standard. In the interview, Mandela attacked her ex-husband, Nelson Mandela, claiming that he had "let blacks down", that he was only "wheeled out to collect money", and that he is "nothing more than a foundation". She further attacked his decision to accept the Nobel Peace Prize with F. W. de Klerk. Among other things, she reportedly claimed Mandela was no longer "accessible" to her daughters. She referred to Archbishop Desmond Tutu, in his capacity as the head of the Truth and Reconciliation Commission, as a "cretin". The interview attracted media attention, and the African National Congress announced that it would ask Mandela to explain her comments. Days later, a statement was issued on Madikizela-Mandela's behalf claiming that the interview was a fabrication. The Evening Standard stood behind Naipaul, stating "Nadira Naipaul is a distinguished journalist who visited Willie Mandela at home and spoke to her at length about her experiences."

== Personal life ==
At the age of 16 she married an engineer, Agha Hashim, who was 26 years her senior. They had two daughters, Gul Zehra (aka Naeema Hashim) and Sumar Zahra, who lived with various relatives after the marriage ended. Nadira's second marriage was to Iqbal Shah, by whom she had a daughter Maleeha, whom her third husband V. S. Naipaul later adopted, and a son, Nadir Shah.

Naipaul was married to V. S. Naipaul in 1996, and moved to England after their marriage.
