= Black & White (book) =

1980 non-fiction book by Shiva Naipaul

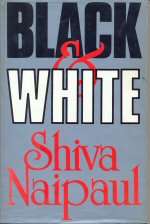
- Cover of U.K. first edition
- Author: Shiva Naipaul
- Language: English
- Published: 1980
- Publisher: Hamish Hamilton
- Publication place: United Kingdom
- ISBN: 0-241-10337-1
- OCLC: 7231272

Black & White is a non-fiction book written by Shiva Naipaul and published by Hamish Hamilton in the U.K. in 1980. It was published with the title Journey to Nowhere: A New World Tragedy in the U.S. The book is based on Naipaul's trip to Guyana in the aftermath of the Jonestown Massacre, and his subsequent trip to the United States, in which he explored links between the People's Temple and other groups and individuals. Naipaul attempted to connect Rev. Jim Jones, founder of the People's Temple, with disparate parts of California's counterculture, and Guyanese and other Third World governments and the revolutionary ideologies which supported them. Naipaul was highly critical of these and other movements, including black theology, the nascent New Age movement and EST, in as much as they helped, in his analysis, to create fertile ground for the People's Temple to flourish on the two continents. The book's US paperback cover tagline reads "How American ideas and ideologies led to the mass suicide of 900 people in Jonestown, Guyana."

Naipaul later told his father-in-law of the arresting effect that visiting Jonestown had had on him, saying that the dissipation of the earlier comic, lighter tone in his work was due to this experience.
