= Shiva Naipaul =

Indo-Trinidadian and British novelist and journalist (1945–1985)

- Born: 25 February 1945
- Died: 13 August 1985; London Borough of Camden
- Occupation: Writer
- Writing career
- Language: English language
- Notable awards: Guggenheim Fellowship

Shiva Naipaul (/ˈnaɪpɔːl, naɪˈpɔːl/; 25 February 1945 – 13 August 1985), born Shivadhar Srinivasa Naipaul in Port of Spain, Trinidad and Tobago, was an Indo-Trinidadian and British novelist and journalist.

== Life and work ==
Shiva Naipaul was the younger brother of novelist V. S. Naipaul. He went first to Queen's Royal College and St Mary's College in Trinidad, then emigrated to Britain in 1964, having won a scholarship to study Chinese at University College, Oxford. At Oxford, he met and later married Jenny Stuart, with whom he had a son, Tarun.

With Jenny's support, Shiva Naipaul wrote his first novel, Fireflies (1970), which won the Winifred Holtby Memorial Prize from the Royal Society of Literature for best regional novel. It was followed by The Chip-Chip Gatherers (1973). He then decided to concentrate on journalism, and wrote two non-fiction works, North of South (1978) and Black & White (1980), before returning to the novel form in the 1980s with A Hot Country (1983), a departure from his two earlier comic novels set in Trinidad, as well as a collection of fiction and non-fiction, Beyond the Dragon's Mouth: Stories and Pieces (1984).

=== Death ===
On the morning of 13 August 1985, at the age of 40, Naipaul had a fatal heart attack while working at his desk. In an essay V. S. Naipaul wrote for The New Yorker, published in 2019, his older brother reports that he was not surprised at the time to hear about Shiva's death, that Shiva was a drinker, and that a year prior to his death (at a funeral for their younger sister that both had attended) V. S. describes having already seen "the look of death in his brother's face".

== Literary reception ==
Shiva Naipaul did not receive much positive acclaim from reviewers in his lifetime, although he won the Winifred Holtby Memorial Prize for best regional novel from the Royal Society of Literature for Fireflies (1970). An early review by John G. Moss was critical of Naipaul's debut, saying:

There is light without heat. Nowhere does the novel burn with creative energy, yet its uninspired competence is occasionally illuminating. Each fluttering of light is independent of the others and, overshadowed by its context, is extinguished by too much captivity before the reader's eye. Unlike the ones in the story which light up the way, these fireflies have not been collected in a glass jar to die together. They move sporadically, without the discipline of confinement, commanding just enough attention to remind the reader of how dull they actually are.

In 1985, Anglo-Nigerian scholar and writer Adewale Maja-Pearce said that the Naipaul brothers' portrayals of Africa were overly informed by their "slavish worship of an alien tradition which they have adopted wholesale and which they use to measure everything that falls outside it". In 2004, Kenyan literature scholar Tom Odhiambo made a similar critique, saying Shiva Naipaul's portrayal of East Africa in North of South: An African Journey suffered from its over-reliance on existing Western accounts (a "biased archive") of the wider continent. He writes:

Shiva Naipaul's extensive reliance on the existing pre- and colonial-time archive of writing on Africa seriously undermines his representation of life in postcolonial East Africa. The result is a travelogue filled with a great sense of personal disappointment with the political, cultural, economic and social conditions in postcolonial Kenya, Tanzania and Zambia – the countries that he visits. Shiva seems to unwittingly translate this sense of deep disappointment into a 'demonisation' of Eastern Africa.

Following Naipaul's death, some reviewers became more accepting of his work. Martin Amis wrote, in his obituary for Naipaul, "The moment I finished his first novel, Fireflies [1970], I felt delight in being alive at the same time as such a writer … there are many people with whom I can initiate a long train of quotation — and laughter — from that book alone." In 1998, scholar Richard F. Patteson said Naipaul had been "openly reviled by some Caribbean critics on grounds more political than aesthetic". In 2003, Mohamed Bakari, comparing him to his older brother Vidia, described Naipaul as "equally gifted". In 2005, his friend and colleague Geoffrey Wheatcroft said he wrote "splendid journalism", even though he hated being a journalist.

In 2008, writing for The Atlantic, Christopher Hitchens called Naipaul's debut novel Fireflies "one of the great tragicomic novels of our day". That same year, Paul Theroux published Sir Vidia's Shadow, a memoir of Shiva's elder brother, V. S. Naipaul. In it, Theroux takes issue with the younger Naipaul's literary skills, particularly as a travel writer. In 2009, scholar S. Walter Perera said Naipaul's An Unfinished Journey was "a palpable example of traditional travel writing", but criticises Naipaul's "critical rigor" and "First or Second World perspective".

In 2018, C. Darius Stonebanks said Naipaul's work has value for its consideration of the experiences and positionality of brownness as a racial category, especially in the chapter "Between Master and Slave" in North of South. (Note: Stonebanks writes, "Brown-ness is never absent from his writing, and I wonder if it is this positioning that causes irritation and offence in his descriptions as he is not part of this 'special relationship', therefore, not allowed to experience, assess and/or speak. As I read his work, I realized very quickly that he was writing from a perspective that was indeed subversive of the travel genre, as it did not come from the usual sources of Whiteness, nor did it fall into the category of writer as the comprador intellectual (Dabashi, 2011) fueling fantasies of Kipling’s (1899) 'White Man’s Burden'. He is not writing as White or Black, and therefore risks being a nonperson.) He concludes:

Naipaul’s early death leaves his writing in stasis, a snapshot of his moment, yet not fully realized and open to valid and unanswered criticism, sadly, leaving us with no idea how he would have re-examined his narrative. However, Naipaul’s examination of Brown as a marginalized experience resonates today with those who are questioning the limitations of the prevailing Black/White anti-racism paradigm.

In 2020, Bénédicte Ledent writes of Naipaul's attempts to "come to a personal understanding of other peoples, and eventually of himself" in his travel writing. Ledent says that ultimately:

While the younger Naipaul brother’s ambiguous travel narratives may be an index to his own development from a rather binary view of history in North of South to a subtler vision in An Unfinished Journey, they also point to the difficulty of achieving self-knowledge, especially as a diasporic individual, and they are suggestive of an unresolved tension. As a traveller in search of self-definition he is indeed divided between a genuine desire to 'clear up misconceptions' about the postcolonial world, and a tendency to regard his subjects with some contempt, an attitude that often translates into a scathing tone reminiscent of that adopted by his elder brother in his own travelogues.

In 2024, George Cochrane suggested in The Critic that Naipaul had been "unjustly overlooked". He commends Naipaul's "immaculate prose style" and says "Living in Earl's Court" is "an important work of Windrush literature and an interrogation of its author’s wanderlust". Cochrane also suggests that because the younger Naipaul son was raised primarily by his mother, after the death of his father Seepersad Naipaul, his ability to write from the female perspective was "correspondingly strong", unlike his older brother's. At Naipaul's best, he says, his articles are "models of good journalism, full of vivid reportage, provocative opinion and a formidably assured grasp of the (very complex) issues". He further says that while Naipaul was critical of Africa, "there is no question of him defending colonialism, as there is with Vidia".

== Legacy ==
The novelist Martin Amis wrote that "Shiva Naipaul was one of those people who caused your heart to lift when he entered the room ... in losing him, we have lost thirty years of untranscribed, unvarnished genius". An Arena documentary on his brother V. S. Naipaul reproduced footage of Shiva from an earlier documentary from the early 1980s, in which Shiva returned to Trinidad to see his mother.

Shiva Naipaul's literary archive is held at the British Library. The collection (The Shiva Naipaul Archive) "consists of autograph and typescript drafts of Shiva Naipaul's fiction novels, non-fiction and travel writing. It also includes research and drafts relating to his articles, short stories and prose. There is a run of autograph notebooks, largely with notes and research gathered on his travels in India, Trinidad and Tobago, Surinam, Guyana, America, South Africa, Africa, and Australia. There is correspondence dating form his university days, with his family, his wife and a run of business correspondence."

The Spectator magazine, for which his wife Jenny had worked as a secretary, and which had published many of his articles, established the Shiva Naipaul Memorial Prize in his name until 2014.

== Works ==
Novels

- Fireflies (1970)
- The Chip-Chip Gatherers (1973)
- A Hot Country (1983), published in the U.S. as Love and Death in a Hot Country

Nonfiction

- North of South (1978)
- Black & White (1980), published in the U.S. as Journey to Nowhere
- An Unfinished Journey (1986)

Collections

- Beyond the Dragon's Mouth: Stories and Pieces (1984)
- A Man of Mystery and Other Stories (1995), a selection of stories taken from Beyond the Dragon's Mouth

== See also ==
- Capildeo family
