= Fazaia Schools & Colleges =

Educational Institutions operated by the Pakistan Air Force

Fazaia Schools and Colleges is a system of schools in Pakistan affiliated with the FBISE or Federal Board of Pakistan. Its headquarters are in E-9, Islamabad. These educational institutions are operated by the Pakistan Air Force which operates a total of 27 of these schools and colleges. These include:

PAF Schools & Colleges
Institute	Airbase	City
Air University (Pakistan)	PAF Complex E-9	Islamabad
Fazaia Degree College Peshawar	Peshawar Airbase	Peshawar
Fazaia Degree College, Risalpur	Pakistan Air Force Academy	Risalpur
Fazaia Degree College, MRF	Pakistan Aeronautical Complex	Kamra
Fazaia Degree College, F-6	Pakistan Aeronautical Complex	Kamra
Fazaia Degree College Rafiqui	Rafiqui Airbase	Shorkot
Fazaia Degree College, Faisal	Faisal Airbase	Karachi
Fazaia Intermediate College, Islamabad	PAF Complex E-9	Islamabad
Fazaia Inter College, Kallar Kahar	Kallar Kahar Airbase	Kallar Kahar
Fazaia Inter College, Shaheen Camp	Peshawar Airbase	Peshawar
Fazaia Model School, Badaber	PAF Camp Badaber	Peshawar
Fazaia Inter College Minhas	Minhas	Kamra
Fazaia Inter College, Kohat	Kohat Airbase	Kohat
Fazaia Intermediate College, Chaklala	Chaklala Airbase	Rawalpindi
Fazaia Inter College, Jinnah Camp, Chaklala	Chaklala Airbase	Rawalpindi
PAF Public School Lower Topa	Lower Topa	Murree
Fazaia Inter College, Lower Topa	Lower Topa	Murree
Fazaia Inter College, Kalabagh	Kalabagh Airbase	Kalabagh
Fazaia Inter College, Sakesar	Sakesar Airbase	Sakesar
Abdul Razzaq Fazaia College, Mianwali	PAF Base M.M. Alam	Mianwali
Fazaia Inter College, Lahore	Lahore Airbase	Lahore
PAF Public School Sargodha	Mushaf Airbase	Sargodha
Fazaia Inter College, Mushaf	Mushaf Airbase	Sargodha
Fazaia Model Inter College, Mushaf	Mushaf Airbase	Sargodha
Saleem Nawaz Fazaia College, Masroor	Masroor Airbase	Karachi
Fazaia Inter College, Malir	Malir Airbase	Karachi
Fazaia Inter College, Korangi Creek	Korangi Airbase	Karachi
Fazaia Inter College, Shahbaz	Shahbaz Airbase	Jacobabad
Fazaia Inter College Samungli	Samungli Airbase	Quetta

== See also ==
- Pakistan Air Force
