= Mushaf Ali Mir =

Pakistani Air Chief Marshal (1947-2003)

Air Chief Marshal Mushaf Ali Mir NI(M) HI(M) SI(M) SBt
- مصحف علی میر
- ACM Mushaf Ali Mir (1947–2003)

9th Chief of Air Staff
- In office 20 November 2000 – 20 February 2003
- Preceded by: Pervaiz Mehdi Qureshi
- Succeeded by: Kaleem Saadat

Chairman Pakistan Aeronautical Complex
- In office September 2000 – December 2000
- Preceded by: Himself (as Director General)
- Succeeded by: Air Marshal Pervez A Nawaz

Director General Pakistan Aeronautical Complex
- In office January 1999 – September 2000
- Preceded by: Air Marshal Saeed Anwer
- Succeeded by: Himself (as Chairman)

Personal details
- Born: 5 March 1947 Lahore, Punjab Province (British India) (now Punjab, Pakistan)
- Died: 20 February 2003 (aged 55) Kohat Pass, Kohat District, Pakistan
- Cause of death: Aviation accident
- Resting place: Mominpura Graveyard
- Children: 2
- Relatives: Yunus Hussain (brother-in-law)
- Nickname(s): Mashoo; Mir

Military service
- Branch/service: Pakistan Air Force
- Years of service: 1966–2003
- Rank: Air Chief Marshal
- Unit: No. 25 Squadron Night Strike Eagles
- Commands: DCAS (Air Operations); Central Air Command; Northern Air Command; Project ROSE; Project Green Flash; ACAS (Plans); Joint Intelligence X (JIX)
- Battles/wars: Indo-Pakistani war of 1971; Afghan Civil War (1996–2001); 2001–2002 India–Pakistan standoff; War on terror; War in Afghanistan (2001–03)
- Awards: See list

Air Chief Marshal Mushaf Ali Mir (Note: Punjabi, Urdu:مصحف على مير) (5 March 1947 – 20 February 2003) was an influential statesman and a four-star rank air officer who served as the ninth Chief of Air Staff of the Pakistan Air Force (PAF), appointed on 20 November 2000 until his accidental death in a plane crash on 20 February 2003.

In 2001–02, he also commanded and provided the strategy to deploy troops during the military standoff with India. In addition, Air Chief Marshal Mir later went onto facilitate the United States military's war logistics for war operations in Afghanistan. His appointment was cut short when a former PAF Fokker F-27 in which he was a passenger crashed near Kohat, Pakistan.

His death has been subject of numerous conspiracy theories, with many American authors charging him of having advanced knowledge on terrorist attacks in the United States in 2001.

== Early life ==
Mushaf Ali Mir was born in Lahore on 5 March 1947. He belonged to a lower middle class family and was of Kashmiri descent. The family practiced Shia Islam. Mushaf's oldest sister, Surayya Jabeen, was married to Yunus Hussain, who died in the 1965 war.

Mushaf's father, Farzand Ali Mir, was a calligrapher who died when Mushaf was still young. He attended Govt. Wattan Islamia High School in Lahore. Upon his matriculation from a local school in Lahore, Mir initially attended the Government College University but joined the Pakistan Air Force in 1966 which directed him to attend the famed Pakistan Air Force Academy in Risalpur, after the second war with India.

== Personal life ==
Mushaf married Bilquis and they had two sons, Nabeel and Maseel.

== Career in the Air Force ==
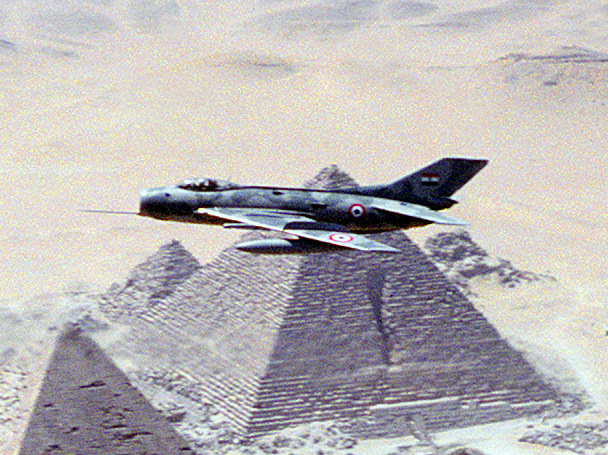
F-6 in Flight: In 1971, Flying Officer Mir flew his F-6 Farmer against the Indian Air Force's MiG-21, shooting down the Indian MiG with his missile.

In 1967, he gained commission in the Pakistan Air Force as a Pilot officer in the GD(P) branch through the Second Short Course.

At the PAF Academy, he qualified to fly the F-6 Farmer fighter jet, and was posted to join the No. 25 Squadron Night Strike Eagles in 1970. In 1971, F/Off. Mir successfully flew his F-6 Farmer against the Indian Air Force's MiG-21, and was credited with shooting an Indian Air Force jet down with his missile.

After the war in 1971, Flt. Lt. Mir attended the Air War College where he attained his master's in War studies, and later went on to attend the National Defence University where he graduated with a master's in Strategic studies. During this time, he became acquainted with then Brig. Pervez Musharraf.

== War and command appointments in the military ==
In the 1970s, Mir joined the Combat Commander's School, first serving as a student before joining its faculty, eventually commanding an Aggressor squadron composing of Dassault Mirage IIIER to act as an Indian IAF's MiG-29M. Wing-Commander Mir was a commanding officer of the No. 33 Wing attached at the Northern Air Command and later took over the command of the Southern Air Command as its AOC. In the 1980s, Gp-Capt. Mir was posted as an air attaché at the Embassy of Pakistan in Washington, D.C. in United States.

He qualified to fly the F-16 Fighting Falcon, as a Group Captain of No. 33 Wing at Kamra Air Base, with personnel from No. 14 Squadron.

In 1994–95, Air commodore Mir, as an ACAS (Plans) at Air AHQ, visited Poland to hold discussions to acquire the Russian Su-27 Flanker but returned since the aircraft was not available.

In 1995, AVM Mir was appointed as Project-Director of Project Green Flash, aiming to acquire Mirage 2000-V from France, and begin his lobbying to acquire the aircraft after test piloting the fighter jet. In 1996, Air Vice Marshal Mir was appointed as Project-Director of Project Falcon that was started to negotiate with Turkey and Jordan to acquire F-16As/Bs.

In 1996–99, Air Vice Marshal Mir took over the command of the Northern Air Command headquartered in Peshawar, and became associated with the ISI, where he aided in providing the aerial support during the civil war in Afghanistan. During this time, Air Vice Marshal Mir was posted as a military adviser to the Saudi Arabian Army and later assumed the short-time command of the Pakistan Armed Forces-Middle East Command before returning to Pakistan for the command appointments.

In 1999, Air Marshal Mir was appointed as the chairman of Pakistan Aeronautical Complex at Kamra.

== Chief of Air Staff ==
In 2000, ACM PQ Mehdi's retirement was confirmed by President Rafiq Tarar, and the Pakistan MoD sent potentials list of three-star air officers for the promotion of the four-star rank.

At the time of promotion to the four-star appointment, there were six senior air marshals who were in the race which included in seniority:

- Air-Mshl. Farooq Qari – Vice Chief of Air Staff at Air Headquarters (AHQ) in Islamabad.
- Air-Mshl. Zahid Anis – DCAS (Air Operations) at AHQ in Islamabad.
- Air-Mshl. Qazi Javed Ahmad – DCAS (Personnel) at AHQ in Islamabad.
- Air-Mshl. Pervez Iqbal Mirza – AOC Southern Air Command headquartered in Karachi.
- Air-Mshl. Riazuddin Shaikh – DCAS (Administration) at AHQ in Islamabad.
- Air-Mshl. Mushaf Ali Mir – Chairman of Pakistan Aeronautical Complex (PAC) in Kamra.

Eventually, the race for the appointment for the air chief was rumored between Air Marshal Farooq Qari and Air Marshal Riazuddin.

On 13 November 2000, President Rafiq Tarar surprisingly approved the appointment of junior-most Air-Mshl. Mir to be promoted to as the four-star air officer in the air force, and appointed him as the Chief of Air Staff. The surprise promotion and command appointment was said to be at the behest of special and personal requests made by then Chairman Joint chiefs Gen. Pervez Musharraf.

Despite the agitation and criticism, Air Chief Marshal Mir eventually assumed the command of the air force as its chief on 20 November 2000.

After the deadly terrorist attacks in New York in the United States in 2001, ACM Mir successfully negotiated with the United States Air Force of releasing the spare parts and updating the software of the F-16s.

During his tenure, the PAF's F-6 aircraft were retired from service, and were transferred to Bangladeshi Air Force. During the military standoff with the Indian Army, ACM Mir placed the air force at war level command, issuing orders for targeting the Indian military posts.

== Death in the air crash ==
This is a very sad day for me. I have lost a very good friend. This is a sad day for the whole nation. The death of Mushaf Ali Mir is a great loss for the country.

— President Musharraf, 2003

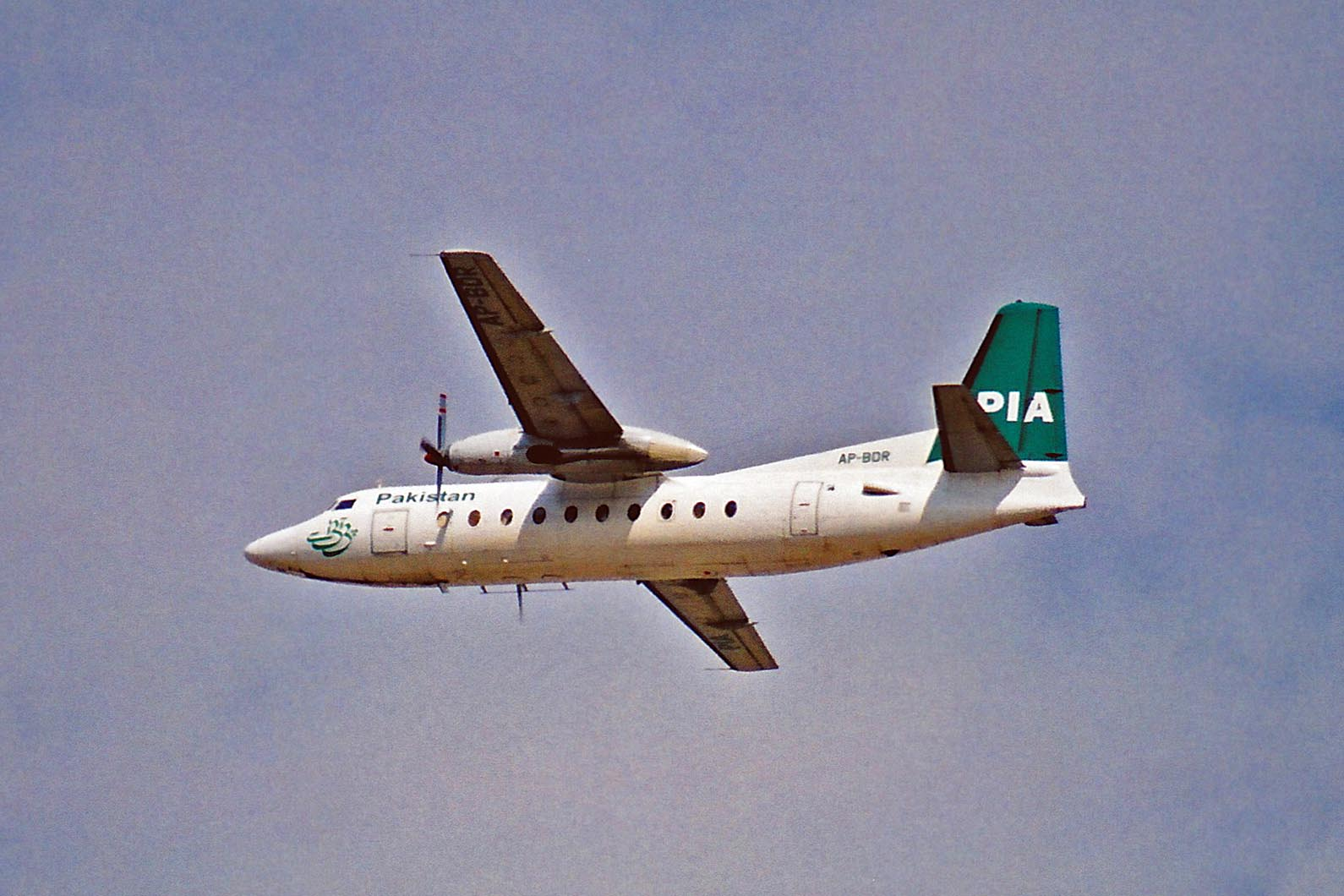
A civilian PIA Fokker F27 in flight. A similar but military F27 was involved in the 2003 crash.

On 20 February 2003, Air Chief Marshal Mushaf Ali Mir boarded on a Fokker F-27 aircraft operated by the Air Force, along with his wife and 15 senior air force officers from Chaklala Air Force Base for a routine flight to Northern Air Command based in Kohat, Khyber-Pakhtunkhwa in Pakistan to review annual preparations and readiness.

The plane lost contact from its military radars at the Northern Air Command and crashed after hitting the highest peak of the mountain at the Tolanj mountain range in Kohat due to an extreme fog and winter temperature. Among the casualties were other high-ranking officials of the Pakistan Air Force, including three Principal Staff Officers – Air Vice Marshal Abdul Razzaq Anjum, DCAS (Training & Evaluation) and Air Vice Marshal Saleem Nawaz, DCAS (Administration) – and Air Commodore Rizwan Ullah Khan, Personal Staff Officer and the air crew.

Upon his accidental death, the Pakistan government give him a state funeral, with many foreign dignitaries attending his funeral and was buried in Mominpura cemetery in Lahore, Punjab, Pakistan.

The Air Force Flight Safety and the Civil Aviation Authority (CAA) ruled out the "act of sabotage" and termed the incident as an accident. Additional inquiries in 2015 resulted by the air force and civilian investigations, the Government declared the aircraft as faulty, not an act of sabotage.

Further military insights revealed at the parliamentary committee noted that the aircraft was in fact faulty, as it was first identified as such by the Navy's inspection team as early as 1993. The Navy purchased the aircraft for its reconnaissance missions before it was transferred to Army Aviation in 1993, which then transferred the plane to Air Force in 1994, which never reviewed the inspection protocol to assess the performance of the aircraft.

Reactions

United States: American ambassador to Pakistan Nancy Jo Powell expressed her sorrow and grief over the tragic air crash on behalf of the United States.

Iran: Iranian President Syed Mohammad Khatami convened a message to President Pervez Musharraf saying: "While expressing condolence and sympathy to Your Excellency as well as the noble people of Pakistan, I pray to Almighty Allah for forgiveness and Divine blessings for the deceased, and patience and fortitude for the survivors."

Afghanistan: Afghan President Hamid Karzai sent a cable where he noted: "On behalf of the people, government of transitional Islamic state of Afghanistan and on my own behalf, I would like to express deepest sorrow and condolences to Your Excellency and to the families of the victims and to the brotherly people of the Islamic Republic of Pakistan."

India: Indian air chief Air Chief Marshal S. Krishnaswamy conveyed sympathies on behalf of the Indian IAF and his own behalf on the sudden and untimely demise of Mushaf Ali Mir.

Pakistan: Foreign Minister K.M. Kasuri termed the death of Air Chief Marshal Mushaf Ali Mir a great loss for Pakistan and its military, and he quoted: "We have lost one of our great sons and a fine soldier; he was an outstanding soldier and his services to Pakistan will always be remembered."

=== Conspiracy theories ===
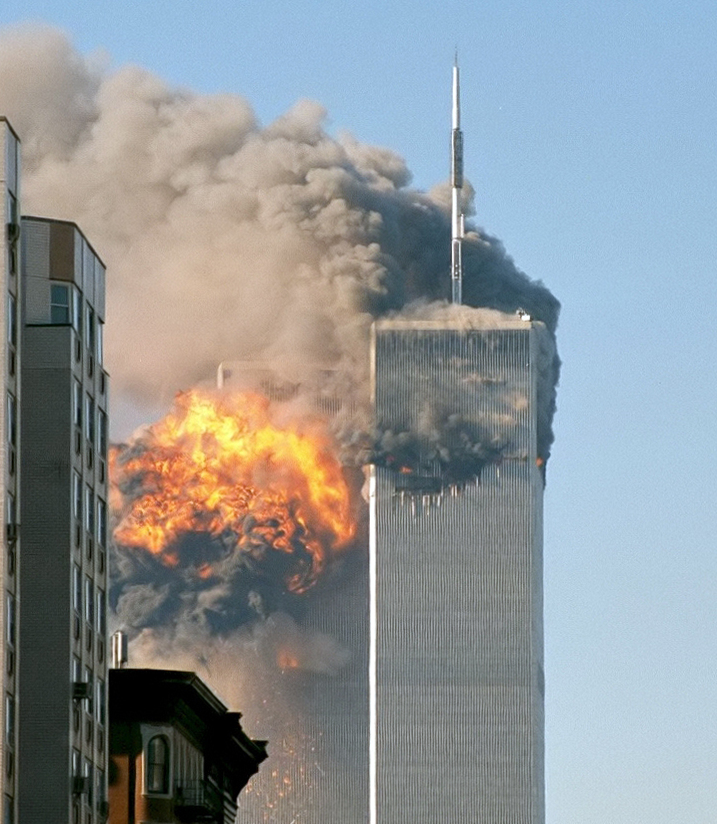
The 9/11 attacks in the United States in 2001. Many American authors have leveled charges on Air Chief Marshal Mir having the advanced knowledge during his time as a spymaster in ISI in 1999.

Since the plane crash in 2003, Air Chief Marshal Mir's death has attracted significant amount of attention and has been subject of conspiracy theories in media and literature. According to Gerald Posner, an American journalist, Mir's death in a plane crash was not an accident but an act of sabotage, which he claimed in his book: Why America Slept: The Failure to Prevent 911, written in 2003.

Several American authors of counterterrorism studies have suspected him of having advanced intelligence knowledge on the planning of the terrorist attacks in the United States by al-Qaeda, during his time when Mir was serving in the ISI as its spymaster.

Subsequently, Posner and his American colleagues have claimed that Osama bin Laden and other Afghan Arabs had struck a deal with Inter-Services Intelligence (ISI) through Mir in 1996 to get protection, arms, and supplies for Al-Qaeda. The meeting was blessed by the Saudi royal family through Prince Turki bin Faisal Al Saud — the Saudi intelligence chief.

However, after the terrorist attacks in the United States in 2001, and a reversal of Pakistani and Saudi stances favoring the Afghan Taliban and their allies al-Qaeda, the three Saudi princes associated with the deals died within days, and seven months after that, Mir's plane crashed in the Kohat region of Pakistan.

Prince Turki bin Faisal, on the other hand, was removed as intelligence chief and sent as Ambassador to United Kingdom during the same time.

In 2015, the Air Force's Flight Inquiry Board and the CAA dismissed the claims of sabotage when they submitted their year long investigation reports to the Public Accounts Committee of the Pakistan Parliament, citing the poor maintenance of the aircraft. They backed up their evidence when identifying the faulty Fokker F27 Friendship that the Air Force had transferred the plane to Navy but the aircraft was returned to the Air Force due to its faults during its flight.

According to the analysis written in 2003 by Najam Sethi, a Pakistani commentator, the claims might have been "untrue" but the allegations are very explosives directed towards the Pakistani military.

== Awards and decorations ==
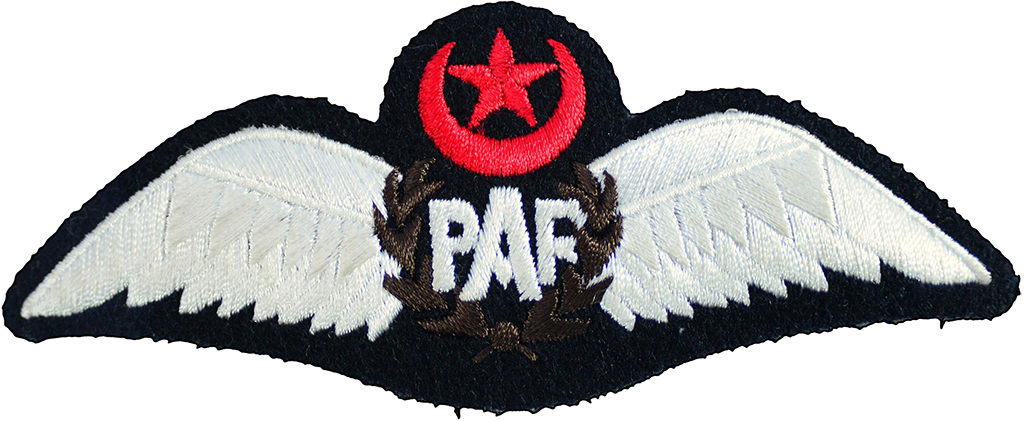

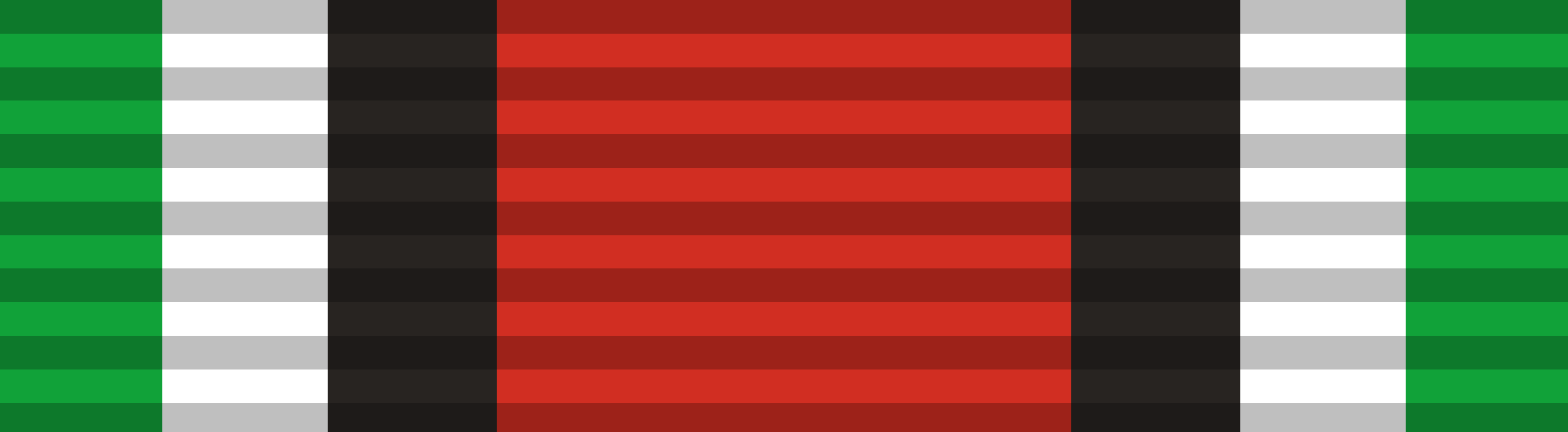

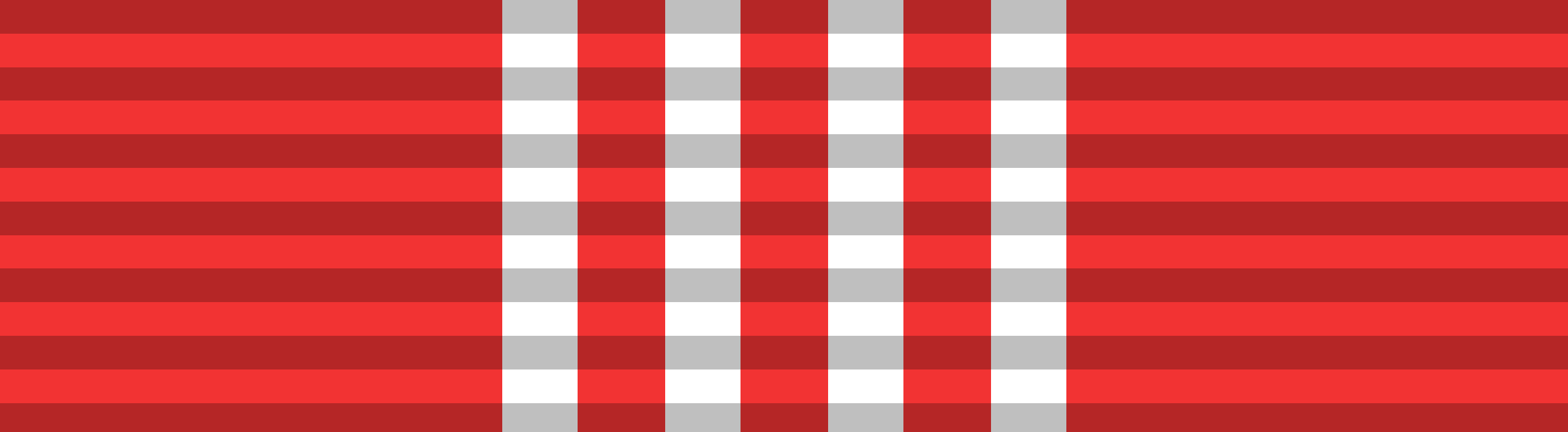

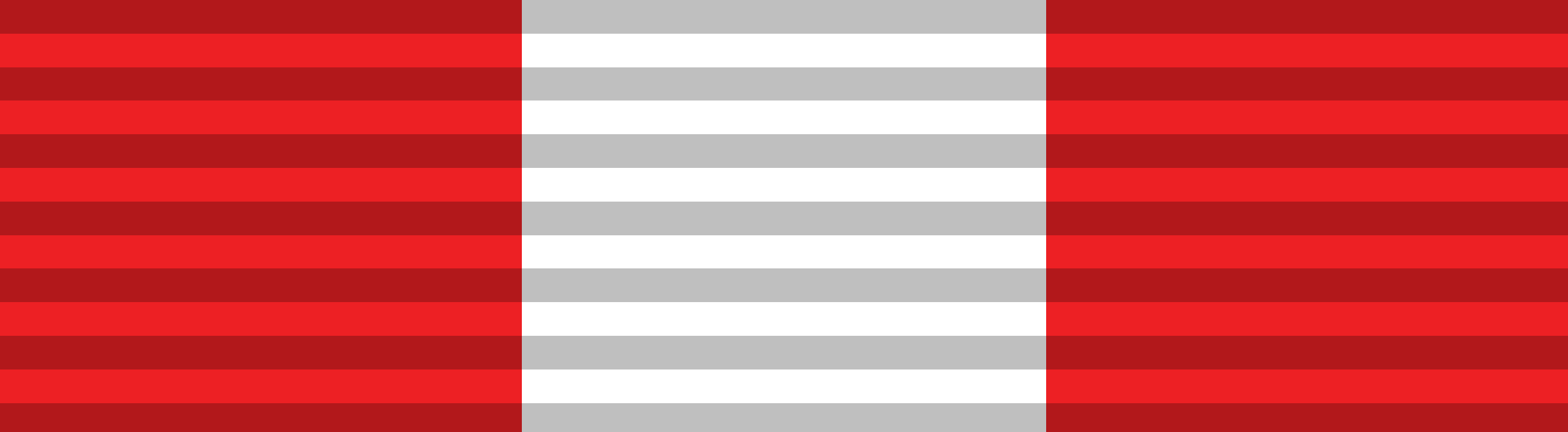

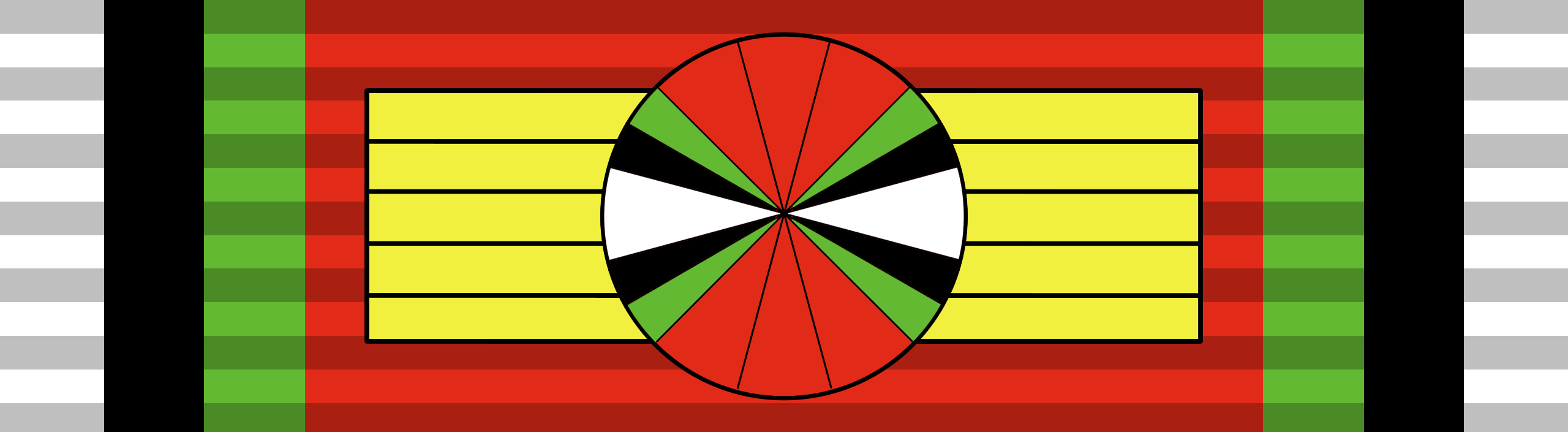

PAF GD(P) Badge RED (More than 3000 Flying Hours)
Nishan-e-Imtiaz (Military) (Order of Excellence)		Hilal-i-Imtiaz (Military) (Crescent of Excellence)	
Sitara-i-Imtiaz (Military) (Star of Excellence)	Sitara-e-Basalat (Star of Valour)	Sitara-e-Harb 1965 War (War Star 1971)	Sitara-e-Harb 1971 War (War Star 1971)
Tamgha-e-Jang 1965 War (War Medal 1965)	Tamgha-e-Jang 1971 War (War Medal 1971)	Tamgha-e-Baqa (Nuclear Test Medal) 1998	10 Years Service Medal
20 Years Service Medal	30 Years Service Medal	Tamgha-e-Sad Saala Jashan-e-Wiladat-e-Quaid-e-Azam (100th Birth Anniversary of Muhammad Ali Jinnah) 1976	Hijri Tamgha (Hijri Medal) 1979
Tamgha-e-Jamhuriat (Democracy Medal) 1988	Qarardad-e-Pakistan Tamgha (Resolution Day Golden Jubilee Medal) 1990	Tamgha-e-Salgirah Pakistan (Independence Day Golden Jubilee Medal) 1997	UAE Defence Forces Unification Medal (UAE)
Abu Dhabi Defence Forces Service Medal (UAE)	Order of Merit of the Republic of Turkey (Turkey)	Military Merit Order 1st Class (UAE)	Legion of Merit (Degree of Commander) (USA)

=== Foreign decorations ===
Foreign Awards
UAE	UAE Defence Unification Medal
UAE	Abu Dhabi Defence Forces Service Medal
Turkey	Turkish Legion of Merit
UAE	Military Merit Order - 1st Class
USA	The Legion of Merit (Degree of Commander)

== See also ==
- Pakistan Air Force

== Notes ==
Military offices
Preceded by Parvaiz Mehdi Qureshi	Chief of Air Staff; 2000 – 2003	Succeeded by Kaleem Saadat
