= College of Flying Training =

Flying Training college in KPK, Pakistan

- کالج آف فلائنگ ٹریننگ
- Other name: CFT
- Motto: مرے شہپر کی زد میں ہے گردوں
- Motto in English: The vast sky is bound to my strongest feather
- Type: Military college
- Academic affiliations: Air University
- Dean: Air Commodore Faisal
- Commandant: Air Commodore Saqib
- Location: Risalpur, Khyber Pakhtunkhwa, Nowshera District, 24090, Pakistan; 34°04′52″N 071°58′21″E
- Language: English; Urdu
- CFT College of Flying Training (Pakistan)

The College of Flying Training (CFT) is located at Risalpur, Nowshera District, Khyber-Pakhtunkhwa, Pakistan. The college is a constituent unit of the Pakistan Air Force Academy and affiliated with Air University (Islamabad) since 24 August 2010. College of Flying training consists of four flying training squadrons, which include Basic Flying Training squadron, Primary Flying Training squadron, Advance Jet Training squadron, and Flying Instructor School.

== Academics ==
The college offers undergraduate programs in BS (Aviation Sciences and Management) with specialization in Fighter, Light Communication Aircraft, Helicopter, Air Defence, Air Traffic Control, Logistics.

== Notable alumni ==
- Rab Nawaz Choudhary
