= PAF College Sargodha =

Pakistan Air Force College

Location
- Sargodha, Punjab; Pakistan
- 32.0639°N 72.6755°E

Information
- Type: Cadet college
- Motto: Aim High
- Established: January 1953; 73 years ago
- School district: Sargodha
- Principal: Air Vice Marshal (R) Nadeem Akhtar Khan
- Staff: 500
- Faculty: 41
- Grades: 8th to Intermediate
- Enrollment: 370
- Color: Sky Blue
- Affiliation: Federal Board of Intermediate and Secondary Education; Board of Intermediate and Secondary Education, Sargodha
- Website: www.pafcollegesargodha.edu.pk

PAF College Sargodha is a Pakistan Air Force (PAF) operated boarding school located in Sargodha, Punjab, Pakistan since 1953. Founded as a feeder school of the PAF Academy, it has been a public school since 1990 and is funded by the PAF.

== History ==
Sometime in 1950, Air Vice Marshal Richard Atcherley, the Commander-in-Chief of the Royal Pakistan Air Force (RPAF), in his first meeting with Air Commodore M. K. Janjua, who was Officer-in-Charge of the RPAF, expressed their concerns regarding the training of officers. The outcome of these discussions led to the establishment of two feeder schools, the PAF College Sargodha and the other in Lower Topa. Eric Sprawson was appointed as Principal of Royal PAF Public School Sargodha in January 1953. In its first batch, the school inducted 100 boys.

== Principals and Commandants ==
A list of Principals and commandants of PAF College Sargodha since 1953.

No.	Office	Name	Tenure
1	Principal	Eric Sprawson	January 1953 – February 1958
2	Principal	Hugh Catchpole	February 1958 – June 1967
3	Principal	A. Rehman Quraishi	June 1967 – January 1984
4	Principal	Group Captain C. M. Latif	January 1984 – January 1986
5	Principal	Air Commodore M. Akram Lodhi	January 1986 – December 1987
6	Commandant	Air Commodore Fareed A. Shah	December 1987 – April 1991
7	Commandant	Air Commodore M. Bilal Khan	April 1991 – January 1993
8	Commandant	Air Commodore S. Imtiaz Hyder	January 1993 – November 1993
9	Commandant	Air Vice Marshal (Retired) Aftab Raja	November 1993 – November 2001
10	Commandant	Air Commodore (Retired) M. A. Qadir Sargaana	November 2001 – February 2002
11	Principal	Air Commodore (Retired) M. A. Qadir Sargaana	February 2002 – February 2007
12	Principal	W. C. Hignett	February 2007 – November 2009
13	Principal	Air Commodore (Retired) Tayyab N. Akhtar	November 2009 – August 2012
14	Principal	Air Commodore (Retired) Farooq H. Kiyani	August 2012 – July 2013
15	Principal	Air Vice Marshal (Retired) Sajid Habib	July 2013 – October 2016
16	Principal	Air Vice Marshal (Retired) Qasim Masood Khan	October 2016 – December 2020
17	Principal	Air Vice Marshal (Retired) Imran Khalid	December 2020 – December 2022
18	Principal	Air Vice Marshal (Retired) Asif Maqsood	February 2023 – 14 April 2024
19	Principal	Air Vice Marshal (Retired) Nadeem Akhtar Khan	15 April 2024 – present

== Notable alumni ==
- Farooq Feroze Khan, former Chairman Joint Chiefs of Staff Committee (CJCSC) and Chief of Air Staff (CAS)
- Kaleem Saadat, former Chief of Air Staff (CAS), PAF
- Tanvir Mahmood Ahmed, former Chief of Air Staff (CAS), PAF
- Rao Qamar Suleman, former Chief of Air Staff (CAS), PAF
- Abdul Razzaq Anjum, Deputy Chief of the Air Staff (Training & Evaluation), PAF
- Rizwan Ullah Khan, Personal Staff Officer to Chief of Air Staff (CAS) Mushaf Ali Mir, PAF
- Ahsan Iqbal, former Federal Education minister, Government of Pakistan
- Muhammad Abdul Mannan, Planning Minister of Bangladesh
- Shahid Aziz Siddiqi, Vice Chancellor, Ziauddin Medical University, Karachi
- Ahsan Saleem Hyat, former Vice Chief of Army Staff (VCOAS), Pakistan Army
- Ehsan ul Haq, former Chairman Joint Chiefs of Staff Committee (CJCSC)
- Moeen U Ahmed, former Chief of Army Staff, Bangladesh Army
- Shahid Lateef, former Vice Chief of Air Staff (VCAS), PAF
- Ghulam Muhammad Malik, former Commander X Corps, Rawalpindi
- Abul Manzur, Bir Uttam, Bangladesh Army
- Saiful Azam, Sitara-e-Jurat, PAF, BAF
- Mohammad Ziauddin BU
- Matiur Rahman (military pilot), Bir Sreshtho, Bangladesh Air Force.
- Momtaz Uddin Ahmed, Chief of Air Staff, Bangladesh Air Force.
- Sultan Mehmood, Chief of Air Staff, Bangladesh Air Force.
- Mohammad Rafiqul Islam, Chief of Air Staff, Bangladesh Air Force.
- Fakhrul Azam, Chief of Air Staff, Bangladesh Air Force.

== See also ==
- PAF Public School Lower Topa
- Cadet College Hasan Abdal
- Military College Jhelum
- Cadet College Petaro
- Cadet College Fateh Jang
