= Abdul Razzaq Anjum =

Pakistani Air Vice Marshal (1952-2003)

Air Vice Marshal Abdul Razzaq Anjum SI(M) TI(M) SBt
- عبدالرزاق انجم
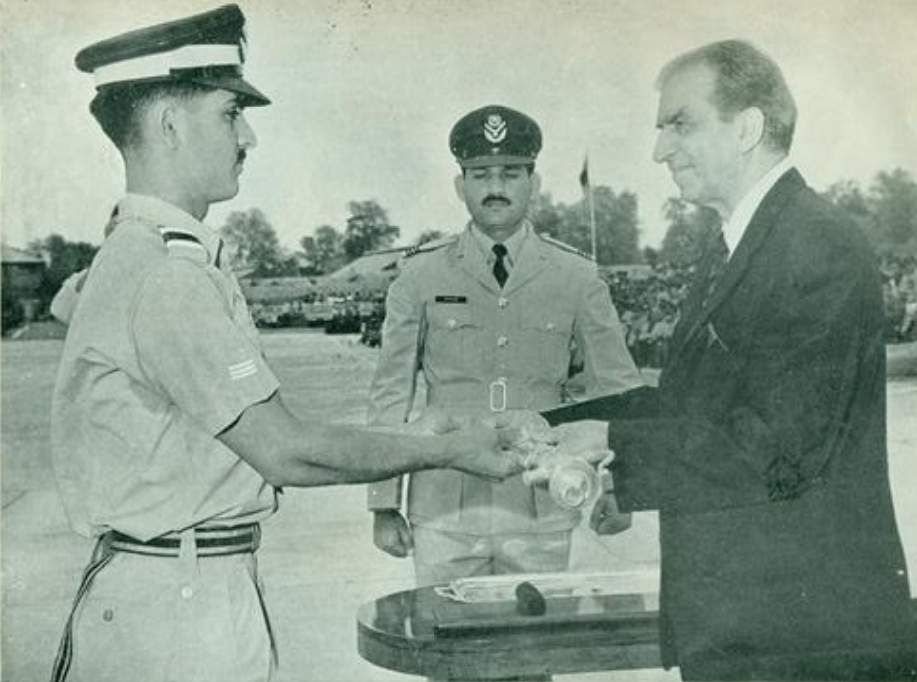
- Flt Cadet Abdul Razzaq receives the Sword of Honour from Aziz Ahmed as the top graduate, PAF Academy, 1973.

Deputy Chief of Air Staff (Training & Evaluation)
- In office 30 November 2000 – 20 February 2003

Commander PAF Base Masroor
- In office July 1998 – March 2000

12th Commanding Officer Combat Commanders' School
- In office August 1992 – March 1994

Officer Commanding No. 14 Squadron PAF
- In office July 1988 – February 1989
- Preceded by: Abdus Sami Toor
- Succeeded by: S. Muzaffar Ali

Officer Commanding No. 9 Squadron PAF
- In office October 1985 – July 1988

Personal details
- Born: Mian Abdul Razzaq Anjum; 25 November 1952 Wan Bhachran, Pakistan
- Died: 20 February 2003 (aged 50) Kohat Pass, Pakistan
- Resting place: Graveyard Pakka Ghanjera, Wan Bhachran, Pakistan
- Children: 4
- Education: PAF College Sargodha (FSc); PAF College Lower Topa; PAF Academy; Combat Commanders' School; PAF Staff College; National Defence College, Rawalpindi
- Civilian awards: Gold Medal from the Board of Intermediate and Secondary Education, Sargodha (1970)

Military service
- Branch/service: Pakistan Air Force
- Years of service: 1973-2003
- Rank: Air Vice Marshal
- Commands: PAF Base Masroor; Combat Commanders' School; No. 14 Squadron PAF; No. 9 Squadron PAF
- Battles/wars: Indo-Pakistani War of 1971; Soviet–Afghan War; 2001–2002 India–Pakistan standoff
- Military awards: See List

Air Vice Marshal Abdul Razzaq Anjum (Note: Urdu: عبدالرزاق انجم) (25 November 1952 – 20 February 2003) was a two-star rank officer of the Pakistan Air Force who held the position of Deputy Chief of the Air Staff (Training & Evaluation) until his death in an aviation accident, along with Chief of Air Staff Mushaf Ali Mir, his wife Begum Bilquis Mir, Air Vice Marshal Saleem Akhtar Nawaz, Air Commodore Rizwan Ullah Khan, and 13 other senior air force officials and aircrew.

Born in Wan Bhachran, Anjum graduated from PAF College Sargodha and secured the first position in the Sargodha Boards of Intermediate/FSc exams in 1970 with a record-breaking score of 884/1000, earning a gold medal while his record stood for 27 years. He received scholarship offers from the British and American embassies in Pakistan to study abroad, but he chose to join the PAF Academy. By 1973, he graduated at the top of his course, winning the Sword of Honour and the trophy for best performance in ground subjects, and was commissioned into the Pakistan Air Force.

In 1987 as Officer Commanding No. 9 Sqn, Wing Commander Abdul Razzaq initiated a mission from PAF Base Sargodha aboard his F-16A alongside his No. 2 Wingman Squadron Leader Sikandar Hayat. The duo fired their AIM-9 Sidewinder missiles and shot down an Afghan Antonov An-26 military aircraft, which had violated Pakistani airspace and was engaged in reconnaissance.

In collaboration with former cricketer-turned-politician Imran Khan, Abdul Razzaq, also a resident of Mianwali, aspired to establish a cadet college in their hometown. Their vision gained momentum when Governor Khalid Maqbool announced the establishment of the cadet college during a public gathering on 24 January 2002, followed by instructions to prepare a feasibility report. Anjum, wished to return to Mianwali after retirement and aimed to contribute to the district's development. After his death, the plan did not materialize and the college was never built.

A year after his death, the Junior Model School was renamed to Abdul Razzaq Fazaia College (ARFiC) by Commander PAF Base Mianwali Air Commodore Inamullah Khan.

== Early life ==
Mian Abdul Razzaq Anjum was born on 25 November 1952 in Wan Bhachran to Mian Mohammad Hayat, a school teacher. He began his education at a local school, excelling academically, and was awarded scholarships in Class V and VIII. He then enrolled at PAF College Sargodha as part of the 16th Entry, attending from Class VIII to XII. Assigned Student No. 795, he resided in the Sabre House and secured first place in the Matriculation examination.

He was described as an excellent soccer player during his student life at the college and contemplated joining the Pakistan men's national field hockey team but his instructors didn't allow him and forced him to go to the Air Force.

In Class XII, he topped the Intermediate exams and in the Science/Humanities Groups from the Sargodha board, announced on 12 September 1970. Abdul Razzaq's record remained unbroken for 27 years until 1997.

Despite receiving scholarship offers from the American and British embassies to study in their countries, he declined and chose to join the Pakistan Air Force (PAF).

== Personal life ==
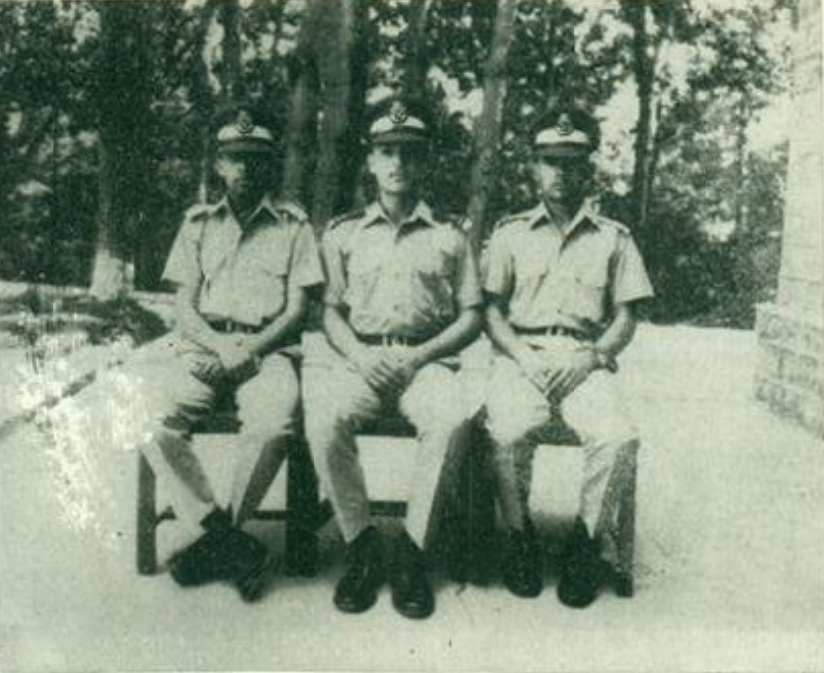
From left: Waseem Raza, Abdul Razzaq, and Mansoor Shaukat. In the Sargodha board Intermediate Exam of 1970, Abdul Razzaq clinched the 1st position and was awarded the gold medal. Mansoor secured the second position, earning the silver medal, while Waseem attained the third position, 1970

Abdul Razzaq has three brothers, retired Lieutenant Colonel Mian Aamir Hayat of the Pakistan Army, Mian Muhammad Nawaz Salar and Mian Asif Hayat.

Abdul Razzaq was survived by his widow and their four children, two sons and two daughters.

The Abdul Razzaq Fazaia College (ARFiC) magazine in its January 2019 issue, described him as a "very humble, simple, hardworking, brave, ambitious, industrious person and a real son of the soil," who was obedient to his parents and teachers.

== Service years ==
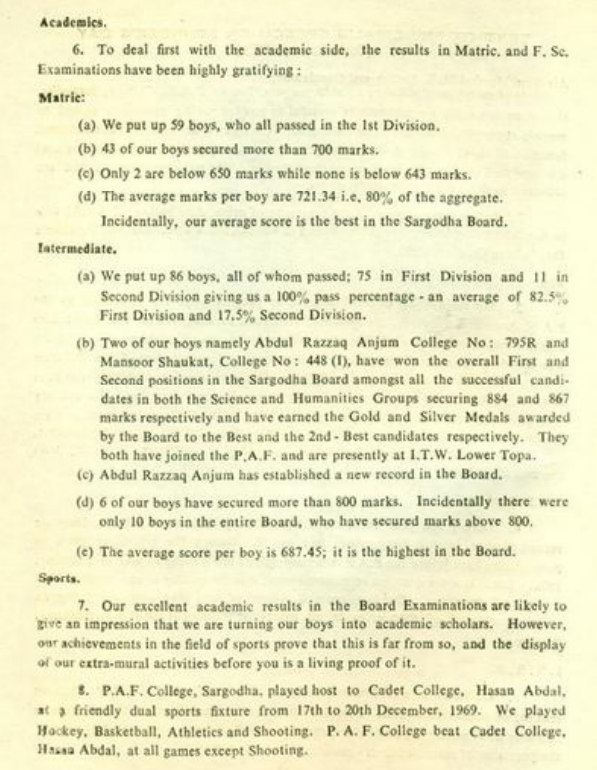
Abdul Razzaq's achievement highlighted in the 1970 PAF Cadet College Sargodha journal

Commissioned in the Pakistan Air Force on 21 April 1973 from the 55th GD(P) course at the PAF Academy, Abdul Razzaq was the top graduate of his course, receiving the Sword of Honour and trophy for "Best Performance in Ground Subjects". Columnist Rai Muhammed Saleh Azam wrote that the Best Pilot Trophy was suspended during the 40th-58th GD(P) courses, otherwise Abdul Razzaq would have won that as well.

He graduated from the Combat Commanders' School, PAF Staff College, and National Defence College, Rawalpindi.

During a joint air combat exercise with the United States Air Force at PAF Base Masroor in April 1978, Jamal Hussain (later an Air Commodore) and his wingman Flight Lieutenant Abdul Razzaq, faced off against two American F-15 pilots in their Mirages. The duo executed an unconventional vertical split manoeuver that caught the F-15s by surprise. Abdul Razzaq's exceptional situational awareness enabled him to line up a successful engagement on one aircraft while Jamal pursued the other.

After the exercise, Hussain noticed Abdul Razzaq waiting on the tarmac with a grin similar to that of the Cheshire Cat. Abdul Razzaq revealed that he had managed to position his Mirage directly behind an F-15 and capture what appeared to be a perfect gun camera shot. The duo assessed each other's camera film and Hussain mentions that both his assertions and Abdul Razzaq's were accurate, but there was a catch. According to the Rules of Engagement, the minimum safe distance during a gunshot scenario was set at 600 feet. In Abdul Razzaq's gun camera footage, his gun sight was the same size as the canopy of the F-15 and he had approached to less than 100 feet of the aircraft. Despite this, he maintained a steady aim on the target.

Jamal Hussain was stunned by the footage and worried about the consequences if senior officers reviewed it, as the manoeuver technically violated safety rules. Recalling the incident, Hussain writes that he could not hide his admiration for Abdul Razzaq's aggressive flying style, confidence, and precision under pressure. The exercise ultimately ended with both sides credited with two kills each. According to Hussain, the leader of the American F-15 pair was dumbfounded and impressed by the skill of the PAF pilots.

In October 1985, he was appointed Officer Commanding No. 9 Sqn. On 30 March 1987, Wing Commander Abdul Razzaq initiated a mission from PAF Base Sargodha aboard his F-16A alongside his No. 2 Wingman Squadron Leader Sikandar Hayat and Ground Controller Squadron Leader Pervaiz Ali Khan. The duo launched AIM-9 Sidewinder missiles at an Antonov An-26 military aircraft that had violated Pakistani airspace, engaged in reconnaissance. They targeted the intruder and the aircraft crashed near Miranshah. On 1 April, a spokesman for the Foreign Office of Pakistan reiterated that the Afghan plane was a military plane and not a transport aircraft as alleged by the Afghan regime, who contended that it was a civilian transport plane carrying 40 passengers, including two children, enroute to Khost. In a telephone call to Reuters, eyewitness Major Shah Nawaz, identified the Antonov An-26 as an reconnaissance aircraft.

Abdul Razzaq detailed the event in his incident report to the Air Force:

DETAIL
Wing Commander Abdul Razzak (PAK/5837)

"The vector given by the controllers started the flow of adrenaline. All the preparatory actions were over in less than 30 seconds. The bandits (two of them) were reported close to Parachinar; another 30-40 miles had to be covered. Soon the controller reported that now only one bandit was violating the border. The second had turned away. When I brought the target into the TD [Target Designator] box at 3-4 NM [nautical miles], I realized that it was a slow moving, larger aircraft. I asked for permission to shoot, which was quickly given. With an overtake rate of well over 200 knots and a low IR [Infra-Red] signature; the minimum range cue was lying close to 4,000 feet. Effectively, I had no more than 1.5 second firing window available. Everything worked as conceived and with the press of the button, the missile was on its way. As I was breaking off, I saw the missile impact the target. No. 2 also released his missile, which also impacted the target. The enemy aircraft crashed on the snow-clad mountains below."

From July 1988 to February 1989, he commanded No. 14 Sqn. As Group Captain, he served as Officer Commanding Combat Commanders' School from August 1992 to March 1994. He later served as Director Operations and Air Staff Officer in Southern Air Command.

In July 1998, Air Commodore Abdul Razzaq was appointed Commander PAF Base Masroor. On 30 November 2000, he was promoted to Air Vice Marshal and appointed Deputy Chief of the Air Staff (Training & Evaluation).

In 2002, AVM Anjum decided to share the lighter and humorous side of military life with the public. To bring the idea to life, he approached (Retd) Wing Commander Zafar Iqbal. Air Chief Marshal Tahir Rafique Butt described him as "an unseemingly choice, knowing that the Wg Cdr had a reputation of being a serious gentleman with humour nowhere part of his personality." The book, "The Air Pockets," was eventually published in 2013. In the foreword, Butt wrote: "I wish to dedicate this book to the memory of the Shaheed AVM Abdul Razzaq, who conceptualized, initiated, and supported this great work."

=== Death in air crash ===
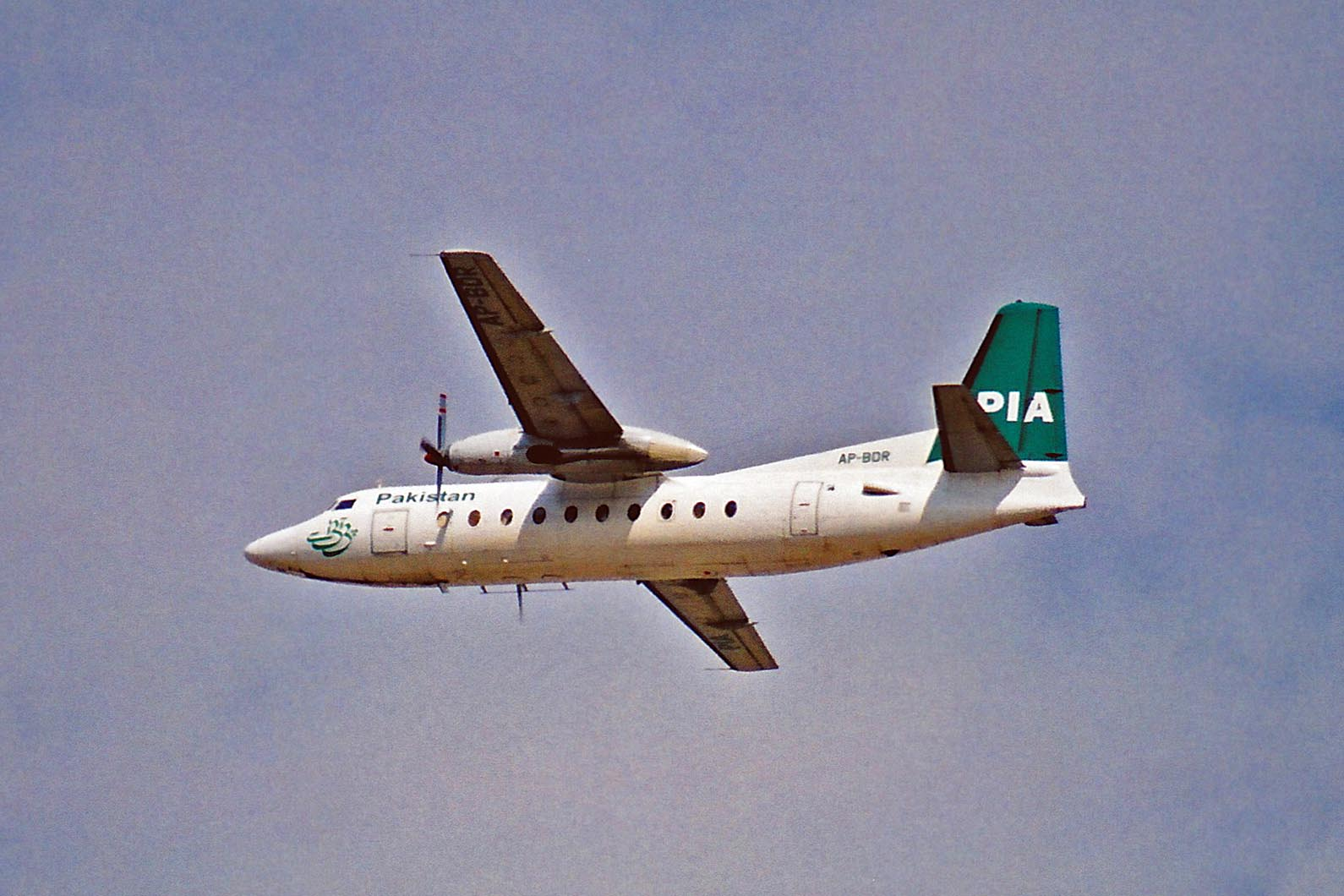
A civilian Pakistan International Airlines Fokker F27 in flight. A similar but military F27 was involved in the 2003 crash.

On 20 February 2003, Abdul Razzaq and Air Chief Marshal Mushaf Ali Mir boarded a Fokker F-27 aircraft at Chaklala airbase, along with his wife Bilquis Mir and other high-ranking officials of the PAF, including two other Principal Staff Officers – Air Vice Marshal Saleem Nawaz, Deputy Chief of Air Staff (Administration) – and Air Commodore Rizwan Ullah Khan, for a routine flight to Northern Air Command at PAF Base Kohat for the annual inspection of the base to review preparations and readiness.

The plane lost contact from military radars at the Northern Air Command and crashed after hitting the highest peak of the mountain at the Tolanj mountain range in Kohat District due to extreme fog and winter temperature. There were no survivors.

The Government of Pakistan honoured the victims with a state funeral which was attended by over 75,000 people along with foreign dignitaries. Citizens lined the streets from Chaklala to Islamabad and according to Dawn as their coffins passed, many were crying. Mushaf Ali Mir and his wife, Bilqees, were buried in Lahore. The remains of Air Vice Marshal Abdul Razzaq were taken to Mianwali while Air Commodore Rizwan Ullah Khan and Air Vice Marshal Saleem Akhtar Nawaz were buried next to each other in Islamabad. The remains of Group Captain Aftab Cheema were sent to Sargodha, Corporal Technician Amjad to Jhelum, Squadron Leader Abdul Rab to Kohat; Squadron Leader Mumtaz Kiani to Abbottabad; Senior Technician Khan Mohammad to Chontra; Senior Technician Ashraf to Chakwal; Senior Technician Ghazanfar to Gujrat; Technician Fayyaz to Swabi; and Technician Khush Qaddam Shah to Gilgit.

Over 10,000 people attended Abdul Razzaq's funeral at PAF Base Mianwali. He was buried at his ancestral graveyard of Pakka Ghanjera in his hometown Wan Bhachran.

Following the crash, PAF's Flight Safety and the Civil Aviation Authority (Pakistan) ruled out the "act of sabotage" and termed the incident as an accident.

Further insights revealed in the 2015 parliamentary committee noted that the aircraft was faulty, and was first identified as such by the Pakistan Navy inspection team as early as 1993. The Navy purchased the aircraft for reconnaissance missions before it was transferred to Pakistan Army Aviation Corps in 1993, who then transferred the plane to the Pakistan Air Force in 1994, which never reviewed the inspection protocol to assess the performance of the aircraft.

== Awards and decorations ==
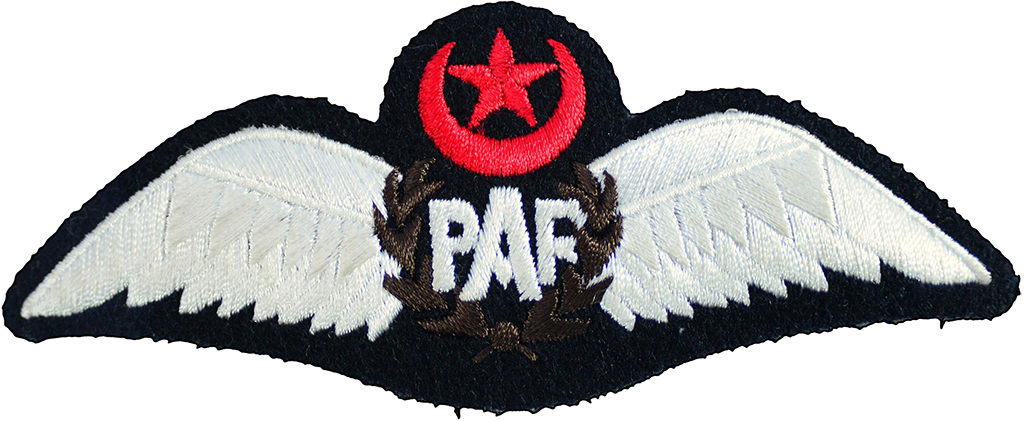

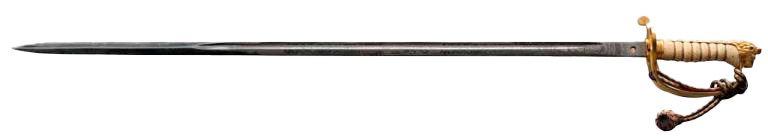

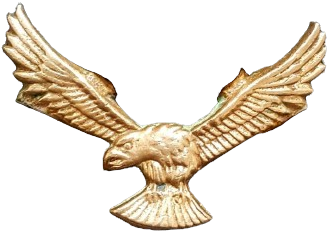

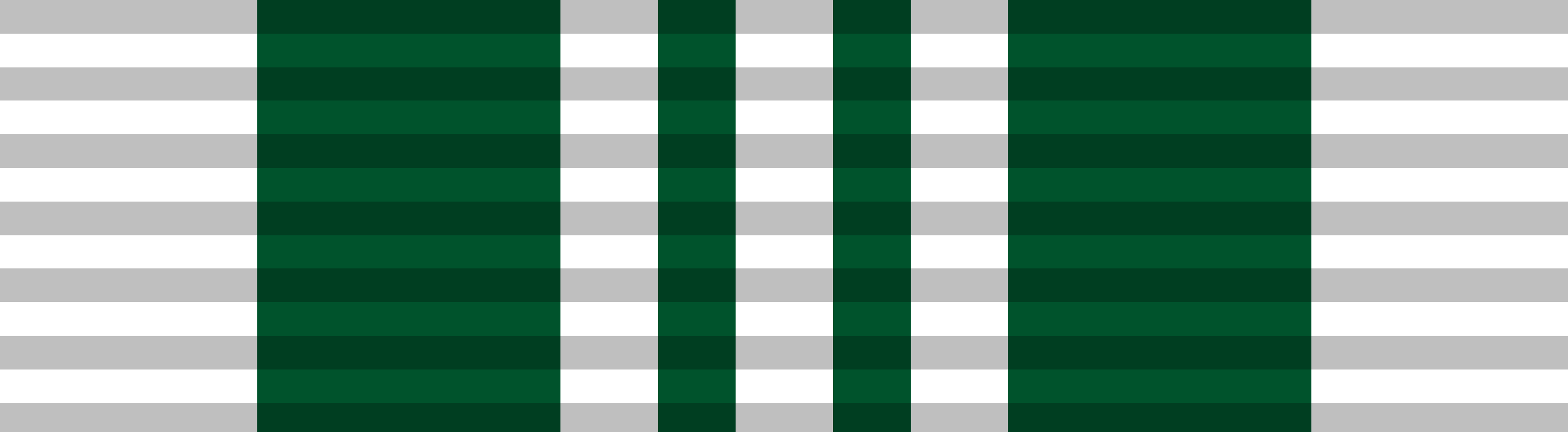

PAF GD(P) Badge RED (More than 3000 Flying Hours)
Sword of Honour; PAF Academy; 1973
Golden Eagle Award (Exceptional Fighter Pilot)
Sitara-i-Imtiaz (Military) (Star of Excellence)			Sitara-e-Basalat (Star of Valour)
Tamgha-i-Imtiaz (Military) (Medal of Excellence)	Sitara-e-Harb 1971 War (War Star 1971)	Tamgha-e-Istaqlal Pakistan (2001–2002 India–Pakistan standoff) 2002	Tamgha-e-Baqa (Nuclear Test Medal) 1998
10 Years Service Medal	20 Years Service Medal	30 Years Service Medal	Tamgha-e-Sad Saala Jashan-e-Wiladat-e-Quaid-e-Azam (100th Birth Anniversary of Muhammad Ali Jinnah) 1976
Hijri Tamgha (Hijri Medal) 1979	Tamgha-e-Jamhuriat (Democracy Medal) 1988	Qarardad-e-Pakistan Tamgha (Resolution Day) (Golden Jubilee Medal) 1990	Tamgha-e-Salgirah Pakistan (Independence Day Golden Jubilee Medal) 1997
