= Rizwan Ullah Khan =

Pakistani Air Commodore (1957–2003)

Air Commodore Rizwan Ullah Khan SBt MRAeS M-PEC
- رضوان اللہ خان
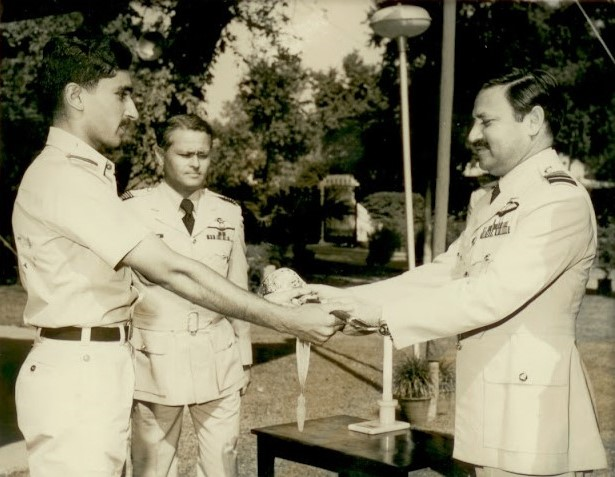
- Flt Cdt Rizwan Ullah receives the Sword of Honour as the top graduate of the 66th GD(P) course, PAF Academy.

Personal Staff Officer to Chief of the Air Staff
- In office August 2002 – 20 February 2003
- Chief of Air Staff: Mushaf Ali Mir

Officer Commanding Combat Commanders' School
- In office July 2001 – July 2002
- Preceded by: Atique Rafique
- Succeeded by: Sohail Aman

Officer Commanding No. 11 Squadron PAF
- In office July 1995 – April 1997
- Preceded by: Ali Asad Khan
- Succeeded by: Akhtar H. Bukhari

Personal details
- Born: Raja Rizwan Ullah Khan; 13 August 1957 Rawalpindi, Pakistan
- Died: 20 February 2003 (aged 45) Kohat Pass, Pakistan
- Education: Cadet College Hasan Abdal; PAF College Sargodha (FSc); PAF Academy; Flying Instructors School; PAF College Sargodha (BSc); College of Aeronautical Engineering (BE); RAF Staff College, Bracknell; King's College London (M.A.); Combat Commanders' School
- Civilian awards: See list

Military service
- Branch/service: Pakistan Air Force
- Years of service: 1978–2003
- Rank: Air commodore
- Commands: Combat Commanders' School; No. 11 Squadron PAF
- Military awards: See list

Air Commodore Raja Rizwan Ullah Khan (Note: Urdu: راجہ رضوان اللہ خان) (13 August 1957 — 20 February 2003), affectionately known as "Razi" by his family and colleagues, was a one-star rank officer of the Pakistan Air Force, an author, and aeronautical engineer. He served as the Personal Staff Officer to Air Chief Marshal Mushaf Ali Mir. They were killed in an air crash alongside his wife Begum Bilquis Mir, Air Vice Marshals Abdul Razzaq Anjum and Saleem Akhtar Nawaz, and 13 other senior air force officials and crew.

During his career, Khan was the Chief Instructor at the Combat Commanders' School (CCS), commanded the No. 11 Sqn (1995—1997), and served as Deputy Director and then Director Operations Research & Development at the Directorate of Plans, Air Headquarters. He also commanded the Combat Commanders' School from July 2001 to July 2002. He was a member of the Royal Aeronautical Society and the Pakistan Engineering Council.

In the 1997 TV series Shahpar, he played the role of Officer Commanding No. 11 Sqn, mirroring his real-life position at the time.

== Early life and education ==
Rizwan Ullah was born on 13 August 1957 in Rawalpindi. He was the first child of then Captain Abdullah Khan of the Pakistan Army and Zubaida. He grew up on various army bases. His father, was held as a prisoner of war (POW) of the Indo-Pakistani War of 1971 and spent three years in a POW camp as a Lieutenant Colonel.

Zubaida decided to enroll both of her sons in Cadet College Hasan Abdal. This decision, along with the insightful letters regularly sent by their POW father, became a defining chapter in Khan's life.

Rizwanullah was in the 17th Entry (1970) of PAF College Sargodha.

== Personal life ==
At the time of Rizwan's death, his brother Imran Ullah Khan was a tanker captain in Houston, Texas and their sister Nabeela, a medical doctor, worked for Fauji Foundation.

Rizwan married Samina Rais, the daughter of (Retd) Air Commodore Rais Rafi Ahmad. They have four children, Andaleeb, Taimur, Sabine, and Bilal. At the time of his death, Samina was the Regional Manager Oracle Corporation for Pakistan, Sri Lanka, Bangladesh, and Nepal.

== Career in the Air Force ==
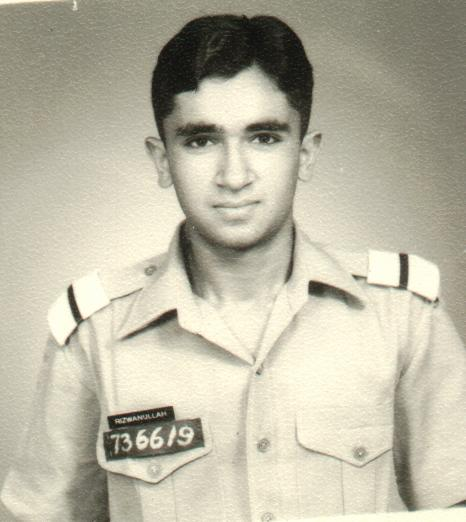
Flt Cdt Rizwan Ullah at the PAF College Sargodha, 1973

Rizwan Ullah Khan was commissioned into the Pakistan Air Force as the top graduate of the 66th GD(P) course at the PAF Academy, earning the Sword of Honour. He acquired his basic fighter flying skills on the Shenyang J-6.

He earned a Bachelor of Science in Aerosciences from PAF College Sargodha in 1977 and graduated from the Flying Instructor's School at PAF Academy in 1982, subsequently serving as a Cessna T-37 Tweet instructor for two years. In 1987, he obtained a Bachelor of Engineering in Aerospace from the College of Aeronautical Engineering. Additionally, he had also graduated from RAF Staff College, Bracknell and earned a Master of Arts in Defence Studies from King's College London.

From July 1995 to April 1997, he commanded the No. 11 Sqn. He was appointed as the Personal Staff Officer of Air Chief Marshal Mushaf Ali Mir in August 2002.

=== Death in air crash ===
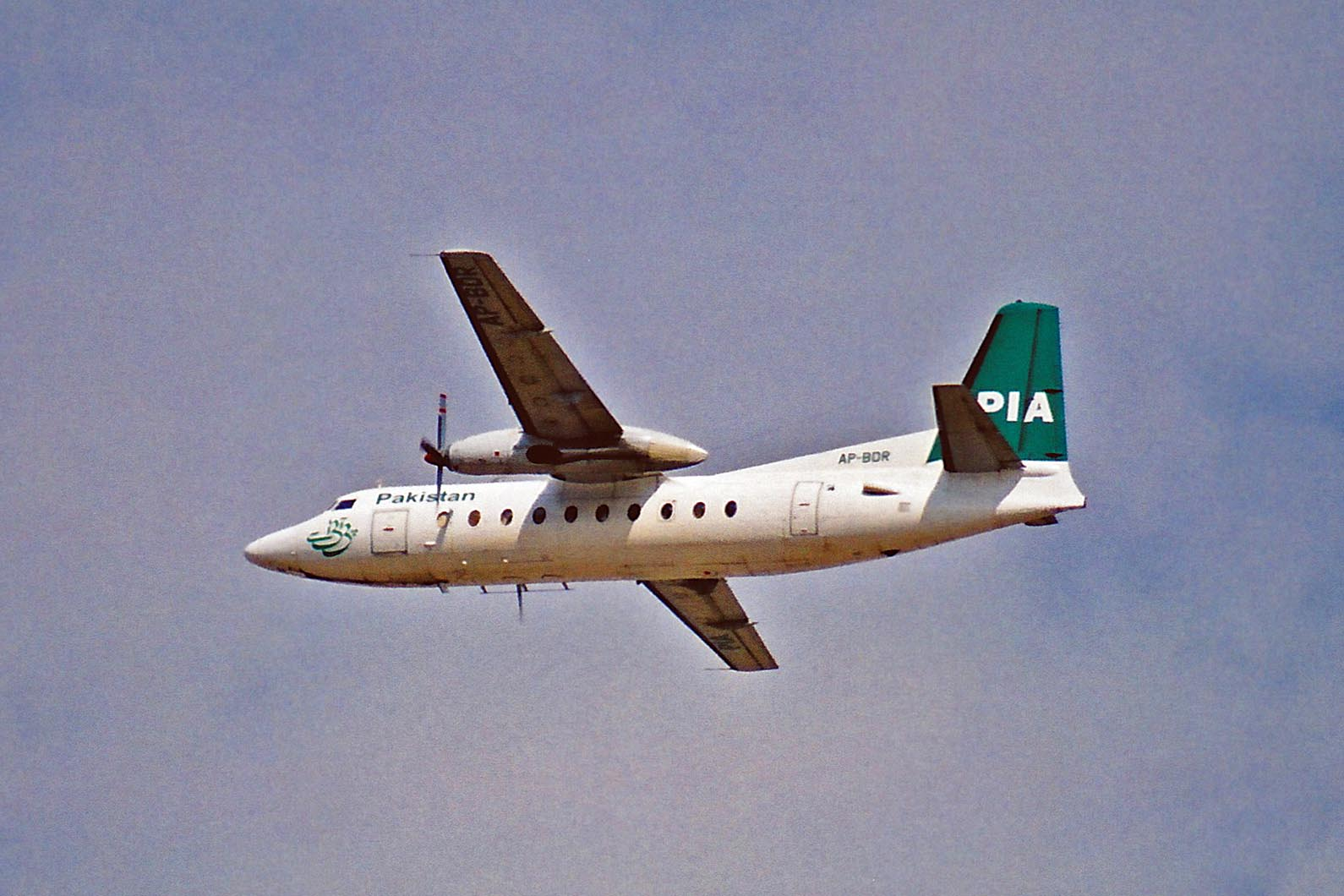
A civilian PIA Fokker F27 in flight. A similar but military F27 was involved in the 2003 crash.

On 20 February 2003, Air Commodore Raja Rizwan Ullah Khan and Air Chief Marshal Mushaf Ali Mir boarded a Fokker F-27 aircraft operated by the Pakistan Air Force, along with the air chief's wife Bilquis Mir and 14 senior air force officers and crew from Chaklala airbase for a routine flight to Northern Air Command PAF Base Kohat in Khyber Pakhtunkhwa for the annual inspection of the base and to review annual preparations and readiness.

The plane lost contact with military radars at the Northern Air Command and crashed after hitting the highest peak of the mountain at the Tolanj mountain range in Kohat District due to extreme fog and winter temperature. Among the casualties were other high-ranking officials of the PAF, including Air Commodore Rizwan, Personal Staff Officer to Mushaf Ali Mir and two Principal Staff Officers – Air Vice Marshal Abdul Razzaq Anjum, DCAS (Training & Evaluation) and Air Vice Marshal Saleem Nawaz, DCAS (Administration) – and the air crew.

The Government of Pakistan honoured them with a state funeral which was attended by over 75,000 people along with foreign dignitaries. Citizens lined the streets from Chaklala to Islamabad and as their coffins passed, many were crying openly. Air Commodore Raja Rizwan Ullah Khan and Air Vice Marshal Saleem Akhter Nawaz were buried next to each other in Islamabad.

The Pakistan Air Force Flight Safety and CAA ruled out sabotage and termed the crash an accident. After additional inquiries in 2015 by the air force and civilian investigations, the Government of Pakistan declared the aircraft as faulty.

Further military insights revealed in the 2015 parliamentary committee noted that the aircraft was faulty and was first identified as such by the Pakistan Navy's inspection team as early as 1993. The Pakistan Navy purchased the aircraft for reconnaissance missions before it was transferred to Pakistan Army Aviation Corps in 1993, who then transferred the plane to the Pakistan Air Force in 1994, which never reviewed the inspection protocol to assess the performance of the aircraft.

== Memorial ==
The Air Commodore Rizwan Ullah Khan Shaheed Memorial Trust also known as Rizwan Scholars, was established by his family and friends and aims to support students from low-income backgrounds. In June 2009, the trust announced that scholarships of Rs. 8.5 million (equivalent to Rs. 43 million or US$150,000 in 2021) had been granted to 200 students, with 90 successfully graduating. The Pakistan Centre for Philanthropy awarded the trust the Nonprofit organization Certification, which has been given to few organisations in Pakistan.

== Books ==
- Rizwan Ullah Khan (1998). Commanding a Fighter Squadron. PAF press.
- Rizwan Ullah Khan (1999). Training to be a Fighter Pilot. PAF press.

== Awards and decorations ==
=== Civilian ===
Awards and decorations received as a civilian:

- National Talent Scholarship after Intermediate Examination, 1975

=== Military ===
Awards and decorations received in military service:

- Sword of Honour, PAF Academy, 1978
- Best Pilot's Trophy, PAF Academy, 1978
- Best Flying Instructor's Trophy, 1982
- Distinction in Bachelor of Engineering (Aerospace), 1987
- Gold Medal in Bachelor of Engineering (Aerospace), 1987
- Trophy for Best in Engineering Discipline, 1987
- Best Aerospace Vehicle Design Certificate, 1987
- Best Combat Commander's Trophy, 1993
- ACES Top Gun Trophy for No. 11 MR Sqn during Sqn Command, 1996
- Sitara-e-Basalat, 1997

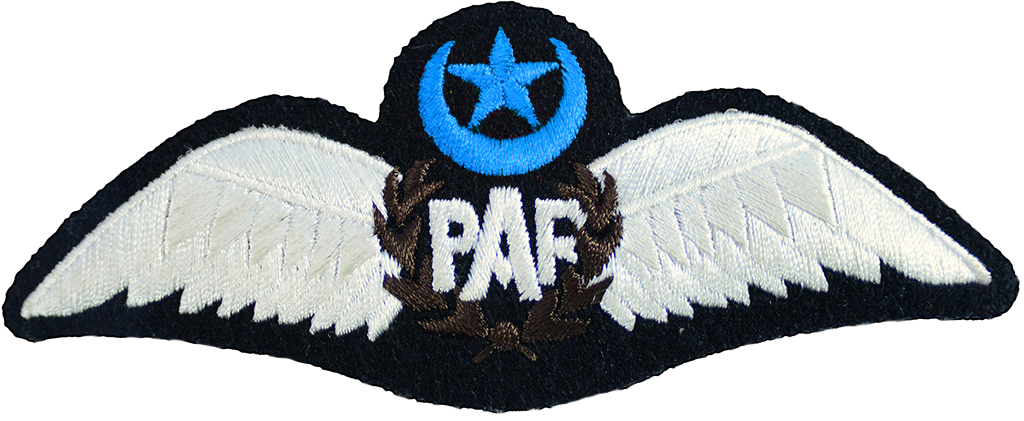

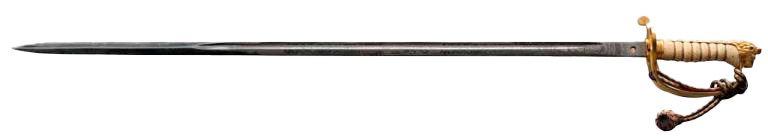

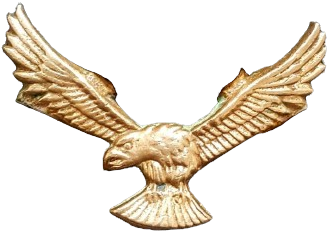

PAF GD(P) Badge BLUE (More than 2000 Flying Hours)
Sword of Honour; PAF Academy; 1978
Golden Eagle Award (Pakistan) (Exceptional Fighter Pilot)
	Sitara-e-Basalat (Star of Valour); 1997		
Tamgha-e-Baqa (Nuclear Test Medal) 1998	10 Years Service Medal	20 Years Service Medal	Tamgha-e-Sad Saala Jashan-e-Wiladat-e-Quaid-e-Azam (100th Birth Anniversary of Muhammad Ali Jinnah) 1976
Hijri Tamgha (Hijri Medal) 1979	Tamgha-e-Jamhuriat (Democracy Medal) 1988	Qarardad-e-Pakistan Tamgha (Resolution Day) (Golden Jubilee Medal) 1990	Tamgha-e-Salgirah Pakistan (Independence Day Golden Jubilee Medal) 1997
