= Wan Bhachran =

Wan Bhachran واں بهچراں
- Town Committee
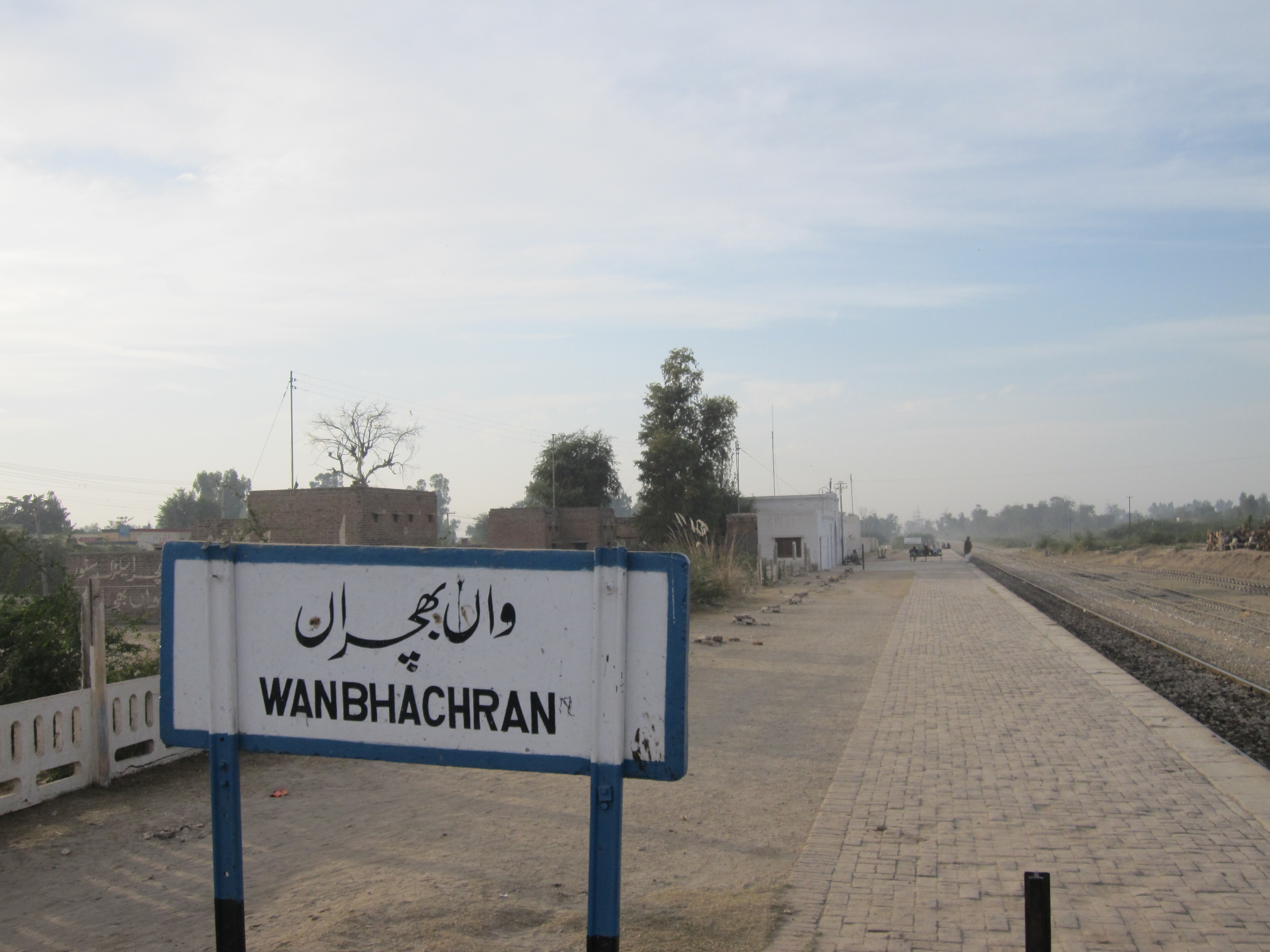
- Wan Bhachran Railway Station (made in the British Raj)

- Location in Pakistan
- Coordinates: 32.4159°N 71.6940°E
- Country: Pakistan
- District: Mianwali District

Government
  - Chairman: Malik Sajjad Ahmad Khan Bhacher Bandial

Population
  - Town Committee: 95,000
  - Urban: 65,000
- Time zone: UTC+5
- Postal code: 42100

Wan Bhachran (Urdu: واں بهچراں) is a town committee of Mianwali District in Punjab province of Pakistan. It is part of Mianwali Tehsil. The word 'Wan' means 'a well' in the Punjabi language. It refers to the well that is situated in the town made by Sher Shah Suri. Whereas 'Bhachars' refers to Qutabshahi khoker Awan, Bhachar clan is prevalent in this part of the region.

In the British era, Wan Bhachran was an independent state consisting of several surrounding areas, including Wan Bhachran City, Pakka Ghanjera, Nangni, Chak Maris, Nari, Sheikhali, Chandni, Phati, Chor Wala, Tibi, Shadia, Pakka Sandan Wala, Muhammad Shah, Bhattian Wala, Jhabar, Bhouki, Kabari, Main Din Wala, Natalanwala, Khichi, Asran Wala, Anwar Chowk, Bala Sharif, Vichven, and several Chakouk etc.

These areas come under the jurisdiction of Wan Bhachran police station

The people of Wan Bhachran and surrounding areas speak Punjabi and belong to several sub castes of Jutt Tribes.

Wheat, rice, sugarcane, millet, corn, millet, cotton, peanuts, canola orchards, canola, gram, guava, peanuts and sunflower are the popular crops here.

== Images ==
Pictures of Wan Bhachran
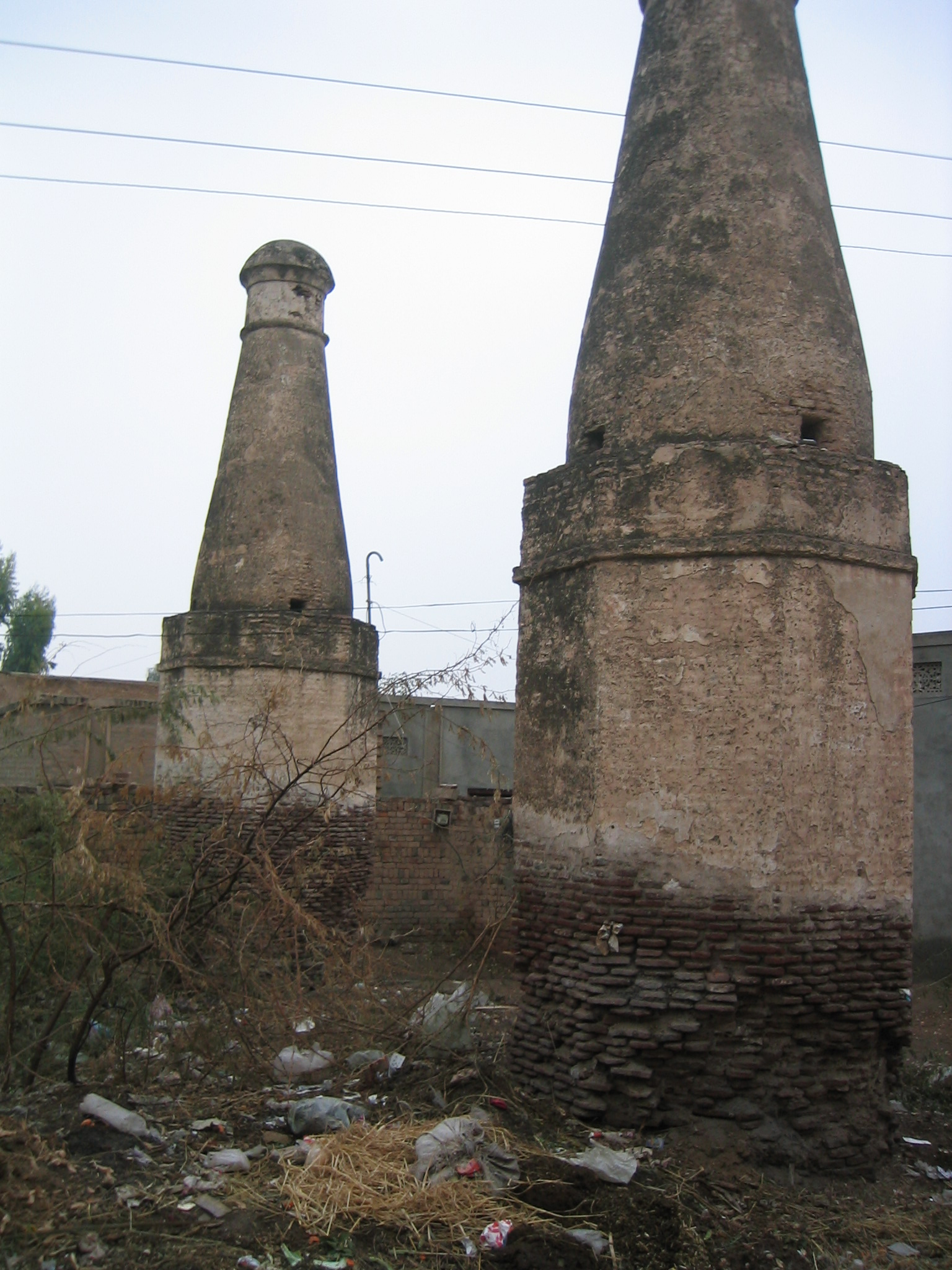
Entrance to the stairs of well made by Sher Shah Suri (presumably used for horses and elephants)

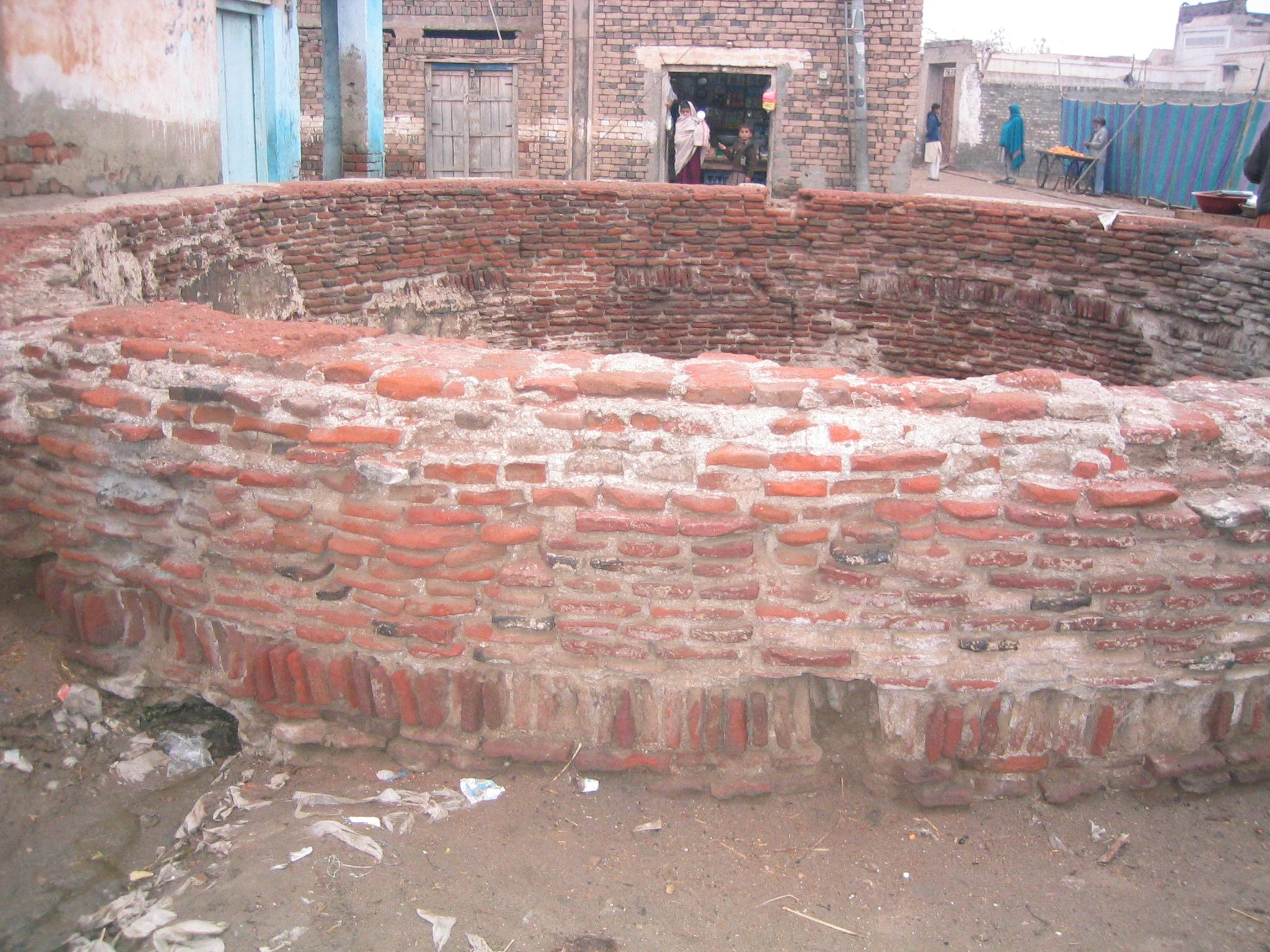
The vertical opening of the well made by Sher Shah Suri (Brick work is now getting damaged.)

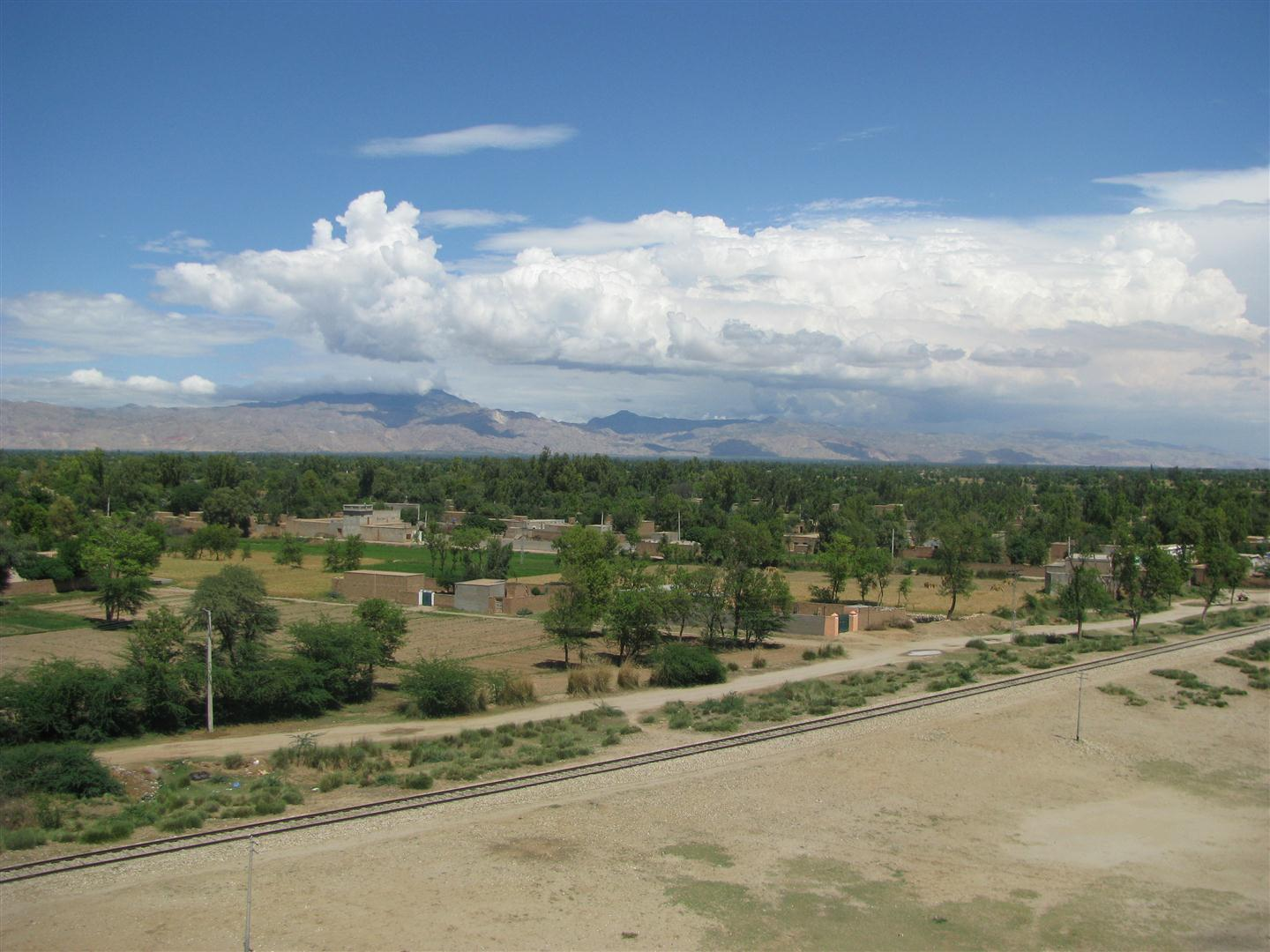
View of Wan Bhachran looking North (In the background is Salt Range, specifically Sakesar.)

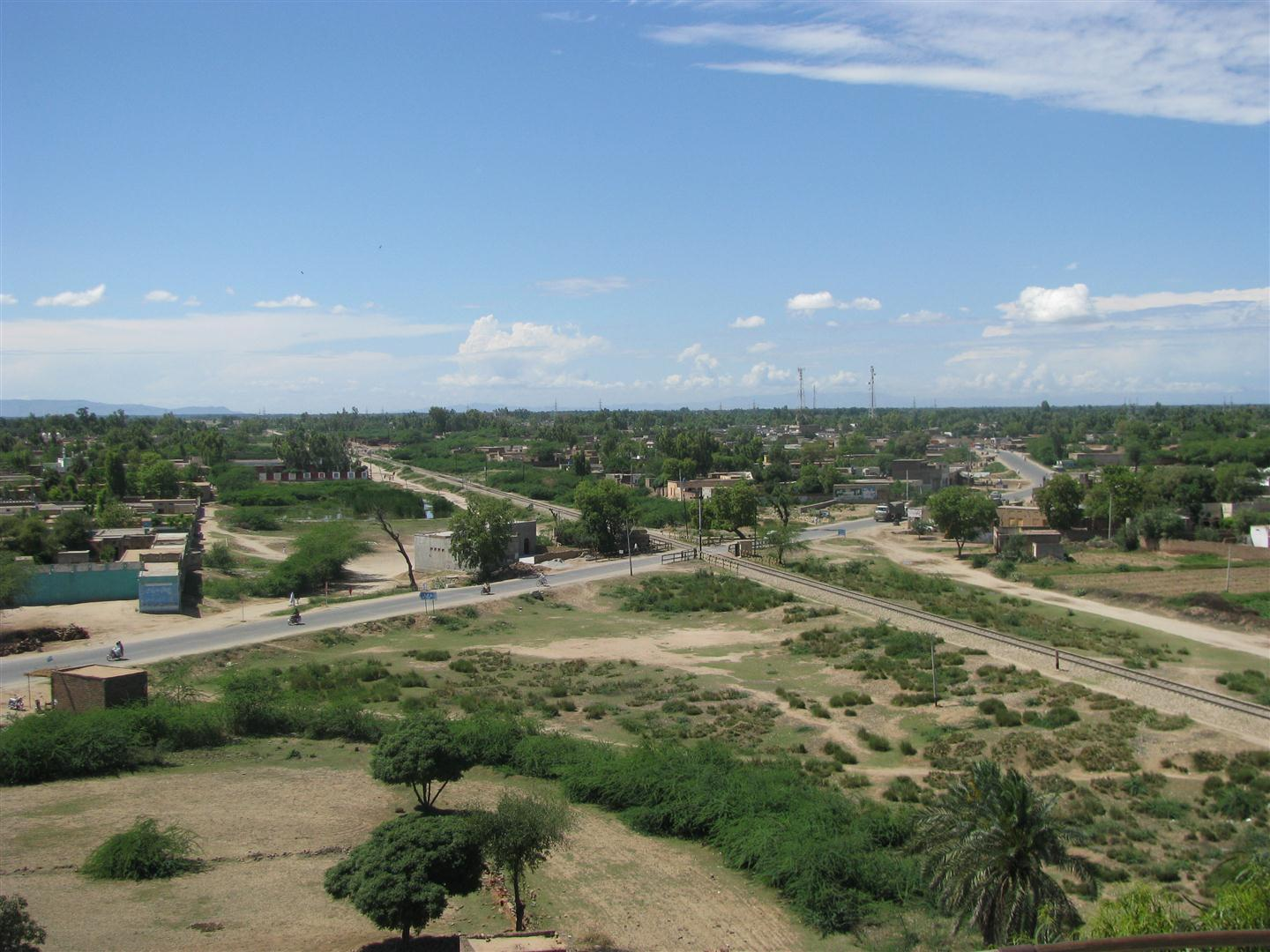
View looking West (Here greenry is primarily due to the irrigation canal passing on the outskirts.)
