= Tamgha-e-Jamhuriat =

Tamgha-e-Jamhooriyat (Urdu: تمغہء جمہوریت) or Medal of the Republic, is a medal that commemorates those who perform an extraordinary service to democracy in Pakistan from the country of Pakistan. The medal has only been bestowed once in the country’s history, when former prime minister Benazir Bhutto awarded it to the then chief of army staff, General Mirza Aslam Beg, in 1988.

- Republic Medal, 1988 (Jamhuriat Tamgha, A.H. 1409)
- Recipients - Military forces of Pakistan

The medal was created in 1988 to commemorate the return to democratic government following the death of General Zia-ul-Haq in an aeroplane crash and the election of Benazir Bhutto as Prime Minister.

== Shape ==
Jamhuriat Tamgha Pakistan

Ribbon

- Circular silvered bronze medal with swivel scrolls and ribbon bar for suspension.
- Obverse - the face with an inscription in Urdu within a floral wreath.
- Reverse - inscribed in Urdu "تمغہء جمہوریت".
- Diameter - 1.3/8th inches (36mm)
- Ribbon - Original

== See also ==
- 1988 Pakistani general election
- Awards and decorations of the Pakistan Armed Forces
