= Pakistan Air Force Academy Asghar Khan =

National air force training school

PAF Academy Asghar Khan
- پاکستان فضائیہ اکیڈمی اصغر خان
- Former names: RPAF Flying Training School (1947-48); RPAF College (1948-56); PAF College (1956-67); PAF Academy (1967-2017)
- Motto: Urdu: فقط ذوقِ پرواز ہے زندگى
- Motto in English: Life is only the taste of flight
- Type: Military service academy
- Established: 15 September 1947; 79 years ago
- Founder: Asghar Khan
- AOC: AVM Shahryar Khan GD(P) SI(M) TI(M)
- Administrative staff: 400
- Undergraduates: 1000 (approx.)
- Postgraduates: 100 (approx.)
- Location: Risalpur, Khyber Pakhtunkhwa, Pakistan
- Nickname: Home of Eagles
- Mascot: Eagle

Risalpur Air Base
- IATA: none; ICAO: OPRS

Summary
- Airport type: Military
- Operator: Pakistan Air Force
- Location: Risalpur, Pakistan
- Opened: 1910; 116 years ago
- Elevation AMSL: 1,050 ft (320 m)
- Coordinates: 34°04′52″N 071°58′21″E

Map
- Location within Pakistan

Runways
Direction	Length		Surface
Direction	m	ft	Surface
09R/27L	2,769	9,085	Asphalt
09L/27R	1,780	5,840	Asphalt
- Source: DAFIF

The Pakistan Air Force Academy Asghar Khan (PAFAA) (Note: Urdu: پاکستان فضائیہ اکیڈمی اصغر خان) is an accredited four-year military academy which provides undergraduate education to officer candidates of the Pakistan Armed Forces, primarily the Pakistan Air Force (PAF). It is named after Air Marshal Asghar Khan, the first native chief of the PAF.

Eligible and selected candidates from all over Pakistan are sent to the academy for flying training. Located in the town of Risalpur in the Nowshera District of Khyber Pakhtunkhwa, the academy's role is the training of General Duty Pilots (GDP), aeronautical and avionics engineers and the initial training of other Ground Branch cadets. Cadets join the academy following a recommendation by the Inter Services Selection Board (Pakistan) and the AHQ (PAF) Special Selection Board for Short Service Commission candidates. Graduates of the four-year program receive a Bachelor of Science degree and are commissioned as Flying Officers.

== History ==
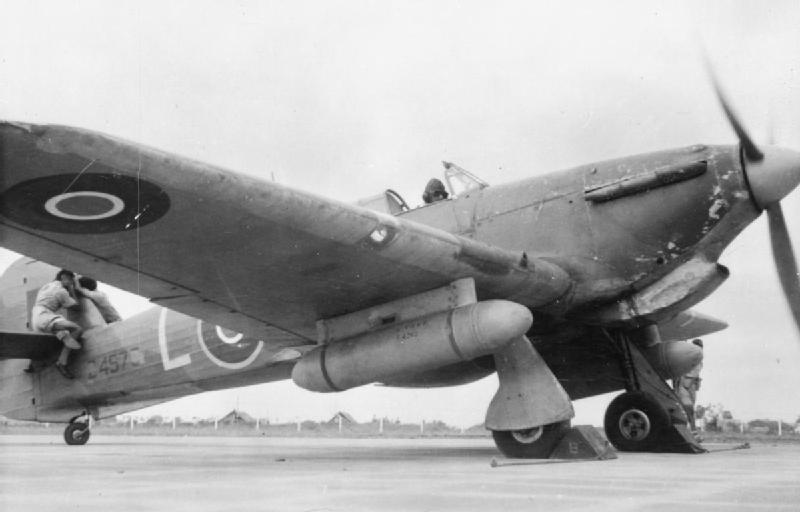
Hawker Hurricane of No. 2 Squadron RIAF at Risalpur before moving to Eastern India for training in support of the Chindits, c. 1939-45

The history of Risalpur airbase dates back to 1910 when an airstrip was developed there. During the First World War, the Royal Flying Corps established a base at Risalpur. In December 1915, the newly raised No. 31 Squadron RAF was stationed here, which was later used against troublesome tribesmen of the Tribal areas along the Afghan border. The squadron flew B.E.2c and Farman biplane in ground support missions. On 24 May 1919, Handley Page V/1500 flew its first mission to attack Kabul from the airfield. In 1925 the air fleet of base was tasked to carry out a survey of the about four hundred square miles area of Ravi River's old river bed for finding ancient sites. After the First World War, the No. 11 Squadron of Royal Air Force equipped with Westland Wapiti was stationed at the base in 1928, that was also used in the operations in the tribal areas. By 1940, Risalpur had become both a training and an operational base. During the Second World War, an operational training squadron was stationed at Risalpur. The base also conducted fighter conversion courses.

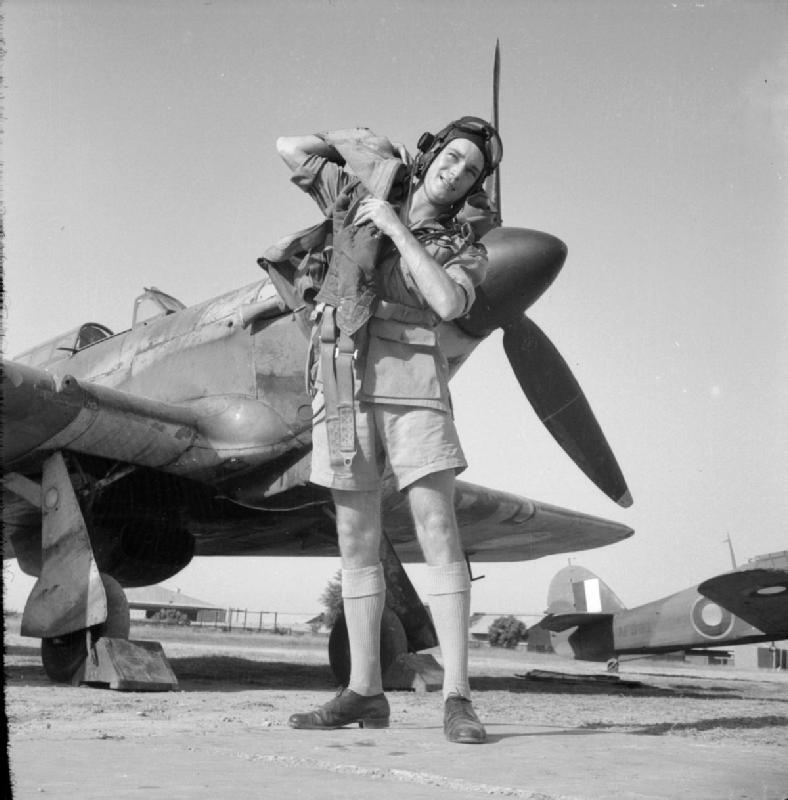
A trainee pilot shoulders his parachute harness, standing in front of a Hawker Hurricane at No. 151 (Fighter) Operational Training Unit at Risalpur, c. 1941-45

After the departure of the British, Risalpur was like an abandoned airfield. The airfield was formally established after Pakistan became an independent nation on 14 August 1947 with 20 officers, 21 trainees, 23 senior non-commissioned officers (SNCOs) and 257 airmen. The base comprised only a handful of men and some equipment. On 15 September 1947, the RPAF Flying Training School was established at Risalpur, carrying out initial, elementary and advanced flying training. Wing Commander Asghar Khan, took over as the first Officer Commanding of the School, with Harvard and Tiger Moth aircraft in the inventory. Flt Lt M Khyber Khan, and his student, Flight Cadet Akhtar, flew the first training sortie on 22 September 1947. That month, six Harvard aircraft from the Flying Training School of Ambala, that were allocated to Pakistan after partition, reached Risalpur.

During the Indo-Pakistani War of 1947, the airfield was used to transport personnel and other equipment to the mountainous terrain of Northern Areas.

On 13 April 1948, the founder of Pakistan, Muhammad Ali Jinnah, visited Risalpur Flying Training School and raised its level to that of a college. Risalpur thus became the genesis of PAF pilots. It became the only military academy of Pakistan to be visited by Jinnah. At this ceremony, Jinnah took the General Salute at the parade and fighter aircraft from Peshawar Air base performed aerobatics.

In March 1950, The Shah of Iran, who was the first Head of state to visit Pakistan and a flyer himself, visited the academy.

During Indo-Pakistani War of 1965 a bomber squadron was stationed here after PAF Station Peshawar was hit by IAF. On 21 January 1967 President Ayub Khan elevated the status of the PAF College, Risalpur to that of an academy.

During 1979 the base was home to No. 2 Squadron which operated the Cessna T-37C Tweet.

After fifty years of Jinnah's visit to the academy, a commemoration was held on 13 April 1997, where among other veterans, Asghar Khan also attended.

=== Commandants/AOC ===
Commandants	Term start
Wg Cdr Asghar Khan	August 1947
Wg Cdr Nur Khan	September 1948
Gp Capt M. A. Rahman	October 1949
Gp Capt R H Water House	June 1951
Gp Capt Maqbool Rabb	June 1954
Gp Capt B. K. Dass	November 1954
Gp Capt Khyber Khan	January 1958
Gp Capt Salahuddin	December 1959
Gp Capt Zafar Chaudhry	January 1962
Air Cdre Choudhry Rab Nawaz	January 1965
Air Cdre Saeedullah Khan	February 1968
Air Cdre Michael John O'Brian	September 1969
Air Cdre Zulfiqar Ali Khan	February 1973
Air Cdre Shujat Ullah Khan	May 1974
Air Cdre Sultan M Dutta	November 1975
Air Cdre M Akhtar	August 1978
Air Cdre M Ashraf Chaudhry	December 1979
Air Cdre M Younis	June 1981
Air Officers Commanding	Term start
AVM Altaf H Shah	January 1984
AVM Anwar Mehmood Khan	August 1987
AVM Raja Aftab Iqbal	August 1989
AVM Aamir Ali Sharriff	March 1993
AVM Hamid A Malik	January 1995
AVM Syed Imtiaz Haider	February 1997
AVM Qazi Javed Ahmed	July 1997
AVM Syed Ataur Rehman	August 1998
AVM Tanveer M Ahmad	January 2000
AVM Aurangzeb Khan	January 2001
AVM Abdus Sami Toor	June 2002
AVM Inam Ullah Khan	November 2004
AVM Mohammad Hassan	July 2006
AVM M Safdar Khan	December 2007
AVM Hafeez Ullah	March 2009
AVM Syed Hassan Haza	November 2010
AVM Kamal	June 2012

== Location ==
Located in a basin 1050 feet above sea level, it is bounded on the south and west by the Kabul and Kalpani rivers, respectively. It is located in Risalpur in Nowshera District and is situated eight kilometers from the city (and district capital) of Nowshera; the famous Khyber Pass lies 90 kilometers to the north. The Risalpur Cantonment itself lies on high ground, some 30 feet above the surrounding area, with the oldest building dating from 1913 or 1914.

== Campus ==
The academy campus is centered around the drill square. The Cadets' mess houses two dining halls for Wing No 1 and Wing No 2, the Sky Lounge, two conference rooms, a movie room and the internet facility. In the front of the mess, lies the red carpet which terminates at the Falcon's Hearth with five cadet blocks on either side of the red carpet to accommodate the cadets. The campus has a gymnasium, four football fields, four hockey fields, four tennis courts, a swimming pool, a polo ground, ten basketball courts, and an athletics field. The academy also features a Cadets' Mosque, the Hobbies' Club building, the Academy Auditorium, and the Academy Library. New training platforms such as the paradise point and KFC are also being included where mental exercises, MCP and various other activities are carried out.

== Aircraft ==
Initially, the institution was equipped with Harvard, Tiger Moth, Auster, Fury and Tempest aircraft. A major change came with the introduction of the Lockheed T-33 jet trainer in 1955 and the air fleet of the academy was transformed from propeller to jet engine aircraft. Eight years after the college was upgraded to an academy in 1967, the T-6G (Harvard), which had rendered extensive service to the PAF since 1947, was replaced by the Mushshak (Saab Trainer). Currently, the trainer aircraft at the PAF Academy are T-37, MFI-17 Mushshak and the K-8, the last of which was brought into service with the PAF in 1995. The academy has two aviation wings and a squadron. The Primary Flying Training (PFT) Wing consists of MFI-17 while Basic Flying Training (BFT) Wing consists of T-37 aircraft. An Advance Flying Training squadron is composed of K-8 aircraft. Additionally, the academy has a fleet of Para Motor Gliders which are used to provide aerial experience to the cadets. These gliders are being looked after by MTW (Military Training Wing).

== Constituent units ==
The PAF Academy consists of 5 components:

=== College of Flying Training ===
The College of Flying Training imparts four-year undergraduate programs in science along with equipping cadets of the Flying branch, with flying skills. CFT is affiliated with Air University. The college consists of Flying Training Wing, Directorate of Studies (DOS), Engineering Wing and Flying Instructors School. While the Flying Training Wing with BFT, PFT and K-8 Squadron its sub units, carry out flying training, the Engineering Wing supports the flying wing by maintaining the air fleet and the Directorate of Studies educates the flying and non-flying branch cadets about aviation sciences, administration, airspace management, humanities and other related academic disciplines. The College of Flying Training imparts education to cadets of the General Duty (Pilot), Air Defence, Administration and Special Duties, Logistics, and Navigation courses. After studying the first three semesters, the GD(P) cadets proceed to the Flying Training Wing. Similarly the others course cadets of CFT proceed for further training in SATS (School of Air Traffic Services) and ADTS (Air Defence Training School).

=== College of Aeronautical Engineering ===
College of Aeronautical Engineering (CAE) is a constituent institute of the academy, which imparts engineering education to the cadets inducted in the engineering branch of PAF. The institute was set up in July 1965 at Korangi Airfield, Karachi, with the help of US Air Force (USAF) and Colonel John H. Blakelock, a member of USAF became its first principal. The first course graduated from the college on 9 November 1968. In May 1986, the college was shifted from Karachi to Risalpur. The college conducts four-year undergraduate program in two engineering disciplines namely aerospace and avionics. CAE started postgraduate programs in 1997. The college was initially affiliated with University of Karachi and then to NED University of Engineering and Technology in March 1977. The college affiliated with National University of Sciences and Technology in 1995. The institute is equipped with modern engineering labs and workshops. CAE got ISO-9001 certified in 1999 for successfully managing quality system of its academic programs. Apart from Aerospace and Avionics, the institute has three more departments: Industrial Engineering, Humanities & Science, and Professional Continuing Education.

=== Flying Instructors School ===
The Flying Instructors School (FIS) began operations on 14 April 1952 with the mission to develop instructional expertise at the Primary, Basic, and Fighter Conversion levels. The first cohort of four officers graduated in August 1952. In May 1954, the school relocated to PAF Station Chaklala before returning to Risalpur in April 1962. FIS trains instructors for the Pakistan Air Force, Army, and Navy, as well as for countries across the Middle East, Southeast Asia, and Africa. The school is responsible for maintaining high teaching standards at the College of Flying Training and Fighter Conversion units. Additionally, it manages the re-categorization of instructors for all three branches of the armed forces. The curriculum includes academic and flight training, along with instructional techniques. Between 1990 and 1997, FIS collaborated with the UK's Central Flying School through reciprocal visits to improve training standards.

=== Para Training School ===
The Para Training School was established at the PAF Academy Risalpur in 2003. It is the second parachute school in Pakistan after the Pakistan Army Para School located at Peshawar. Before its establishment, PAF personnel were trained at the Pakistan Army Para School. The school conducts various basic and advanced courses, including free fall training. It also trains cadets to fly para motor gliders. The Special Service Wing of the PAF also receives parachute training at this school. After a rigorous physical test the top cadets are selected to do the paragliding and para-trooping courses. Paragliding involves wearing a parachute and after jumping from a height, glide and land. Cadets who successfully complete the paragliding course are entitled to wear the paragliding (PG) badge on their uniforms and they further get a chance to now fly para motor gliders which gets them to wear them the PMG badge on their uniforms.

=== Military Training Wing ===
The role of the Military Training Wing (formerly Cadet's Wing) is aimed to impart general service training and develop physical fitness, discipline, personal and leadership qualities in cadets. The subjects covered include:

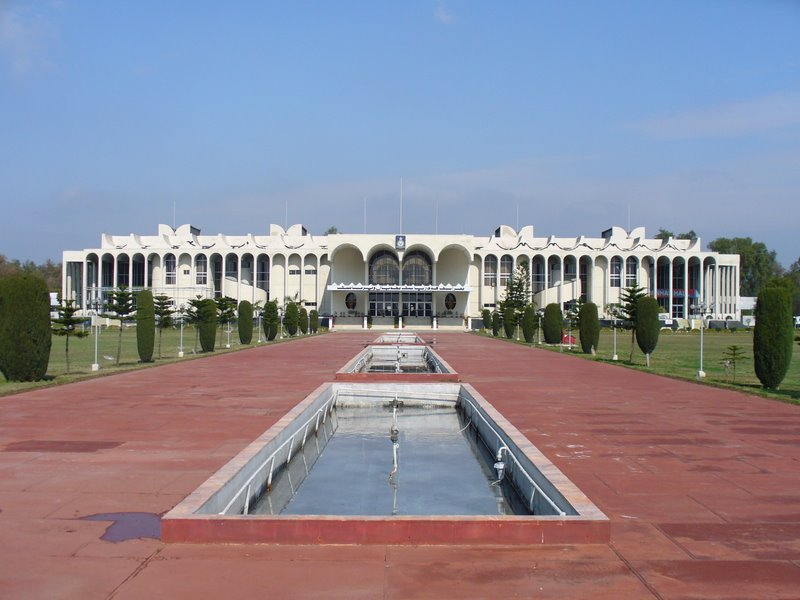
Cadets' Mess

- Air operations
- Use of Small Arms
- Fieldcraft (camping, field exercises etc.)
- Leadership
- Character building
- Physical exercises
- Military drill
- Sports activities
- The cadets mess
- Extracurricular activities
- Literary activities
- Educational visits
- Student counselling

The Military Training Wing comprises officers and instructors who monitor the activities of cadets throughout their training period. The Military Training Wing is sub-divided into four squadrons. The squadrons take part in competitions and the winning squadron is awarded the "Quaid-e-Azam Banner" at the passing out ceremony which is held at the end of term.

The PAF Academy trains officers of the PAF, and cadets and officers of the Pakistan Army, Navy and claims to train officers of other countries including Bangladesh, Brunei, China, Indonesia, Iran, Iraq, Jordan, Malaysia, Nepal, Nigeria, Qatar, Saudi Arabia, Sri Lanka, Sudan, Syria, Turkey, Turkmenistan and the UAE.

== Events ==
=== Passing Out Parade ===
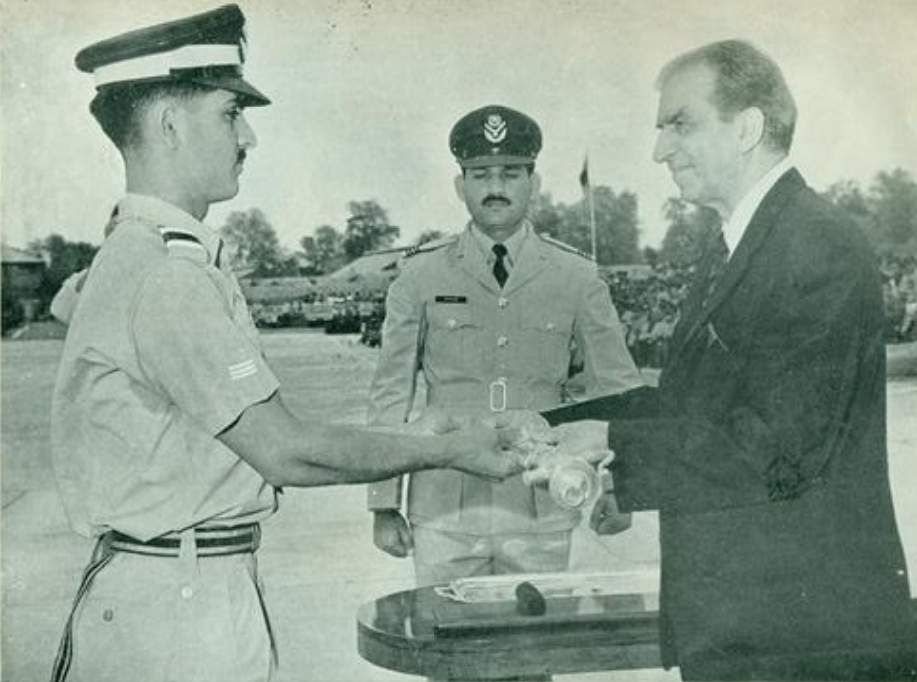
Flt Cdt Abdul Razzaq Anjum receives the Sword of Honour from Aziz Ahmed as the top graduate of the 55th GD(P) course, PAF Academy, 1973.

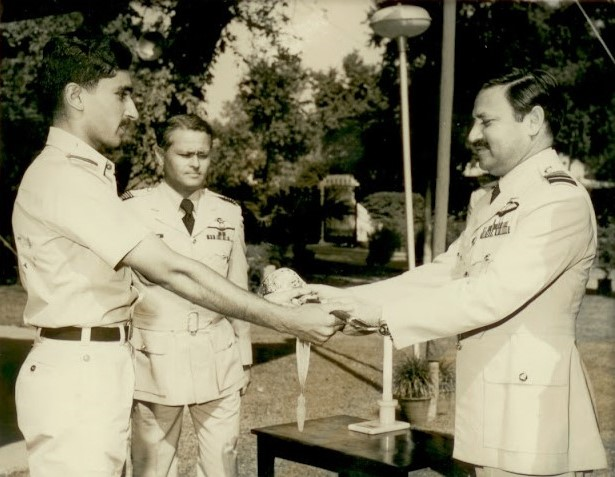
Flt Cdt Rizwan Ullah Khan receives the Sword of Honour as the top graduate of the 66th GD(P) course, PAF Academy.

The Passing Out Parade is held every six months, when the graduating cadets of flying and engineering pass out. The chief guests are usually the President, Prime Minister or the service chiefs of the Pakistan Armed Forces. Graduating cadets take the Oath of Allegiance under the flag of Pakistan, after which they take the salute of the parade. The end of the parade is marked by the aerobatics display of the PAF Aerobatic team renowned as the "Sherdils" (flying T-37 aircraft) and the Academy Aerobatic team known as "Academy Hawks" (flying K-8 aircraft). The awards presented to the cadets at this occasion are:

- CJCSC's Trophy (for Best performance in General Service Training in CAE)
- CJCSC's Trophy (for Best performance in General Service Training in CFT)
- Chief of Air Staff's Trophy (for Best performance in Engineering Discipline)
- Chief of Air Staff's Trophy (for Best performance in Flying)
- Sword of Honor (for Best performance in CAE)
- Sword of Honor (for Best performance in CFT)

The squadron that achieves best score in sports and other activities during the term is also awarded at this occasion with Quaid-e-Azam Banner.

=== Convocation ===
This event also takes place after six months. Two convocations are held each time – one for graduating cadets of the GD(P) branch and the other for cadets of the engineering branch. The awards presented at this occasion are:

GD(P) Course Convocation

- Best Performance Trophy (Air Science Subject)
- Best Performance Trophy (Ground Subjects)
- Best Performance Trophy (Humanities Subject)

Engineering Course Convocation

- President's Gold Medal (Aerospace Engineering)
- Rector's Gold Medal (Aerospace Engineering)
- Rector's Best Aerospace Vehicle Design Certificate (Aerospace Engineering)
- President's Gold Medal (Avionics Engineering)
- Rector's Gold Medal (Avionics Engineering)
- Rector's Best Avionics System Design Certificate (Avionics Engineering)

=== Graduation ===
The graduation ceremony of courses is held semi-annually. The cadets joining ground branches after completing their HSSC spend two to four years at the academy whereas the Bachelor BS degree holder cadets course has a duration of six months.

=== Changing of the Guard at Mazare-e-Quaid ===
The annual Changing of the Guard ceremony at Mazar-e-Quaid, Karachi on Pakistan Defence Day (6 September). Cadets from the PAF Academy assume guard duties at the mazar on this day.

View of the Cadets Mess at Risalpur, 2008

=== All Pakistan Bilingual Declamation Competition ===
The PAF Academy holds an All-Pakistan Declamation Competition, one of the biggest annual events. Some forty teams from major higher education institutes in Pakistan are invited to take part. The event takes place over four days during which a number of rounds are held. The PAF bears all the expenses of travel and accommodation of the teams.

== Falcons Hearth ==
The memorial of the academy is known as 'Falcons Hearth' and is situated on the stairs in front of parade ground. It was erected in memory of cadets and instructors who died during training, and also those who lost their lives on active service during the Indo-Pakistani War of 1965 and the Indo-Pakistani War of 1971.

== Gallery ==
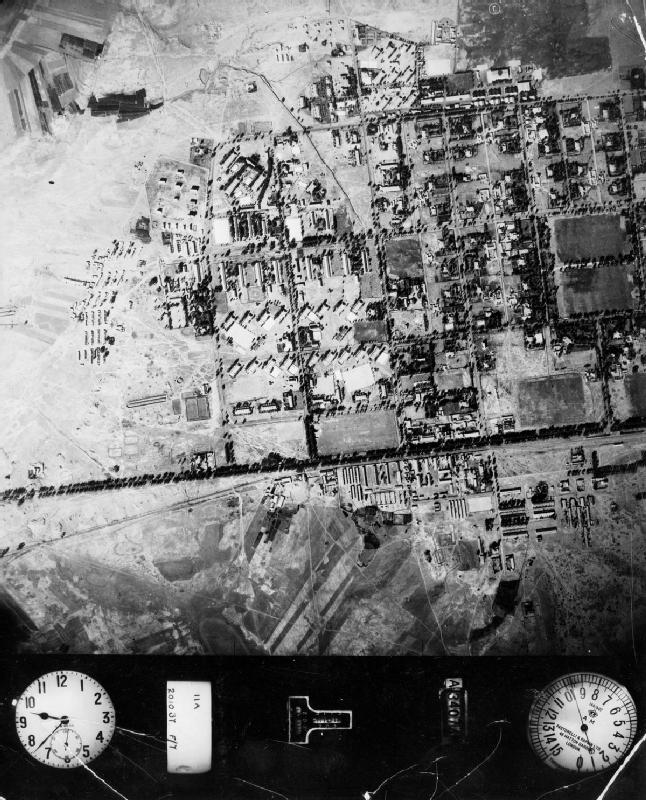
Aerial view of Risalpur Air Station c. 1930–40

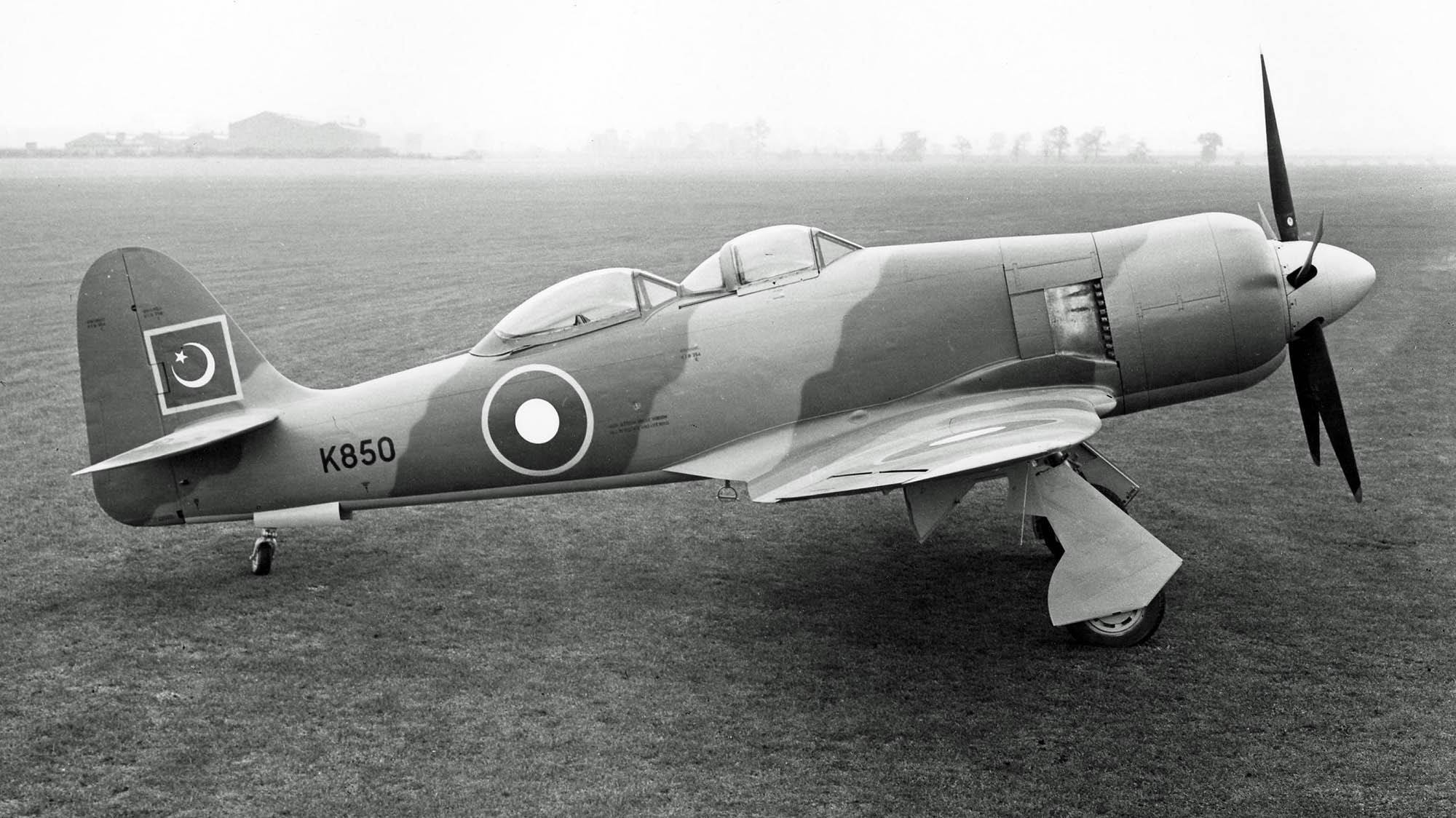
The first Fury of Pakistan, K850 in a pre-delivery photo. Afterwards with a Conversion Squadron, the aircraft received the black code letter N c. 1948

== See also ==
- Military academies in Pakistan
- List of former Royal Air Force stations
- Army Burn Hall College
- Sword of Honour (Pakistan)
