= Risalpur =

Risalpur رسالپور
- City
- Risalpur
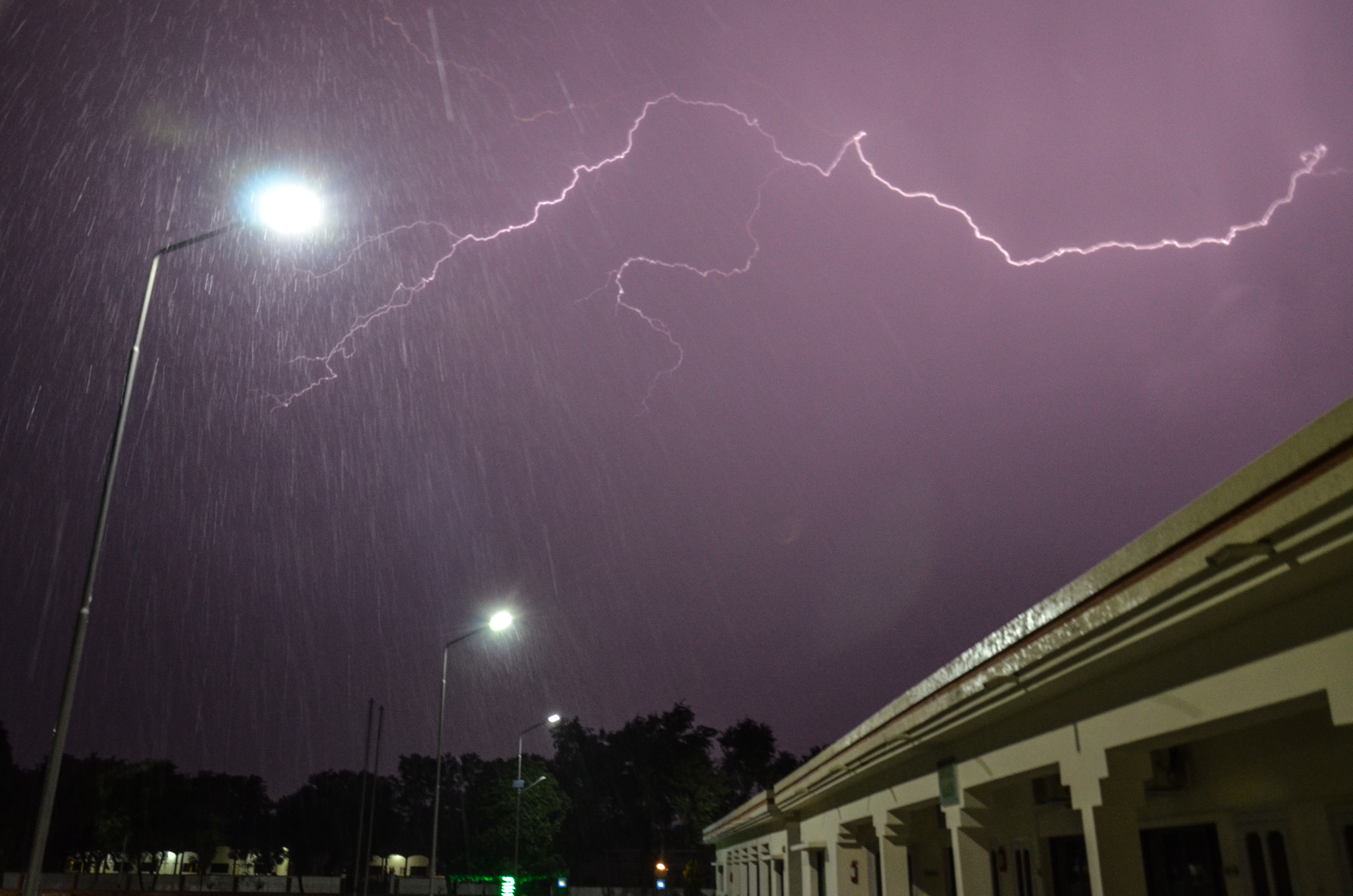
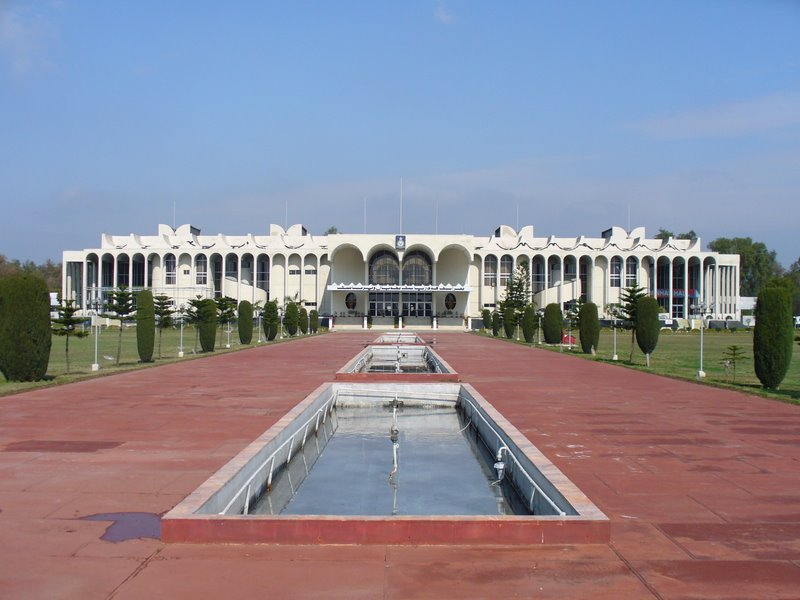
- Top: A rainy day at Risalpur Below: PAF Academy Asghar Khan located in Risalpur
- Nicknames: Home of Sappers, Home of Eagles
- Location within Pakistan
- Coordinates: 34°04′52″N 71°58′21″E
- Country: Pakistan
- Province: Khyber Pakhtunkhwa
- District: Nowshera
- Elevation: 309.0672 m (1,014.000 ft)

Population (2023)
  - Total: 36,074
- Time zone: UTC+5 (PST)
- Postal code: 23200

Risalpur (Pashto/Urdu: رسالپور) is a city in Nowshera District, Khyber-Pakhtunkhwa, Pakistan, situated on the Nowshera-Mardan Road. It is nearly 39 km from Peshawar and 17 km from Mardan and is located at Latitude 34°4'52N and longitude 71°58'21E. In a basin, some 316 meters above sea level, it is bounded on the south and west by the Kabul and Kalpani rivers respectively. The famous Khyber Pass lies 90 kilometers to the north.

Risalpur is known as "Home of Eagles" and "Home of Sappers". It has several important educational institutions and industrial plants. Languages spoken here are Urdu, English, Pashto, and others.

The Risalpur Export Processing Zone is on the main Nowshera-Mardan road. The Risalpur Cantonment itself lies on high ground, some 30 feet above the surrounding area, with its oldest building dating from 1913 (or 1914). The population that mostly lives here are from mixed Pushtoon tribes.

== History ==
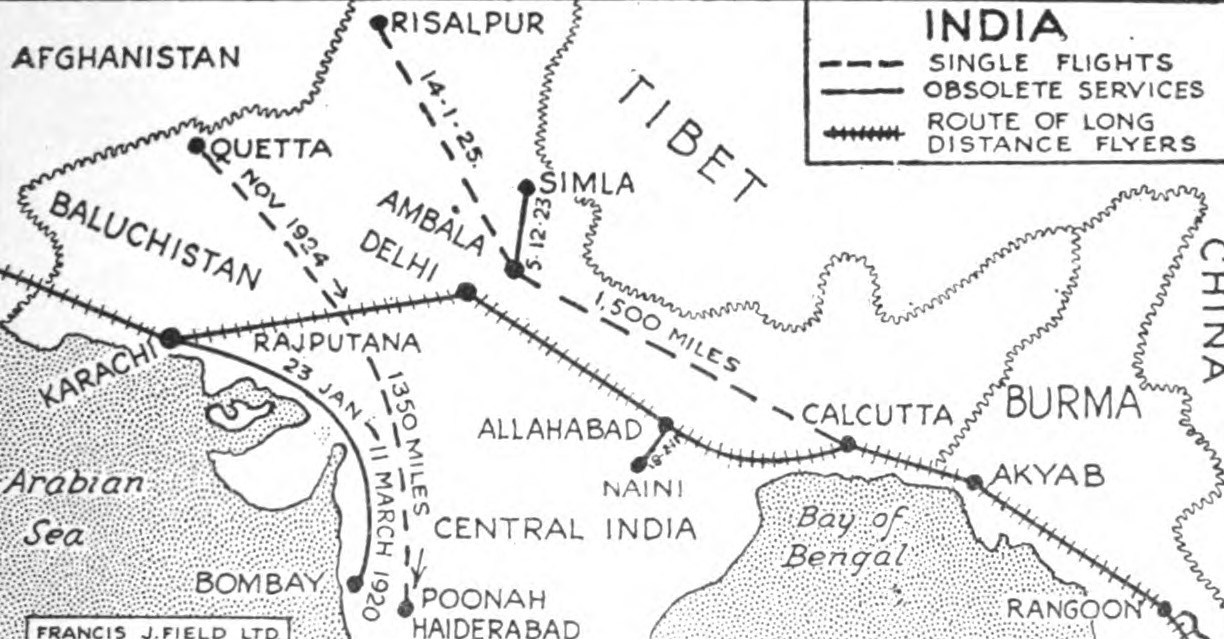
Air routes of British India in 1925, with single flight between Risalpur and Ambala Air Force Station (now in Haryana in India).

In 1910 Risalpur had a former aerodrome and airfield of the Royal Flying Corps, and later the Royal Air Force.

During the First World War, the Royal Flying Corps established an airfield and a fighter conversion unit at Risalpur in British India.

In the Second World War and by 1940, RAF Risalpur had become both an established training and an operational airfield of the Royal Air Force (RAF) of the United Kingdom. It officially became the airfield of the Pakistan Air Force (PAF) on 15 August 1947.

No. 31 Squadron RAF was stationed at Risalpur in 1919 and was used to bomb Kabul and Jalalabad in Afghanistan and later conducted operations in FATA against Faqir of Ipi in Waziristan, along with No. 114 Squadron RAF of the Royal Air Force of Britain. No. 31 Squadron RAF was formed at Farnborough on 11 October 1915. Its first deployment was to Risalpur's Nowshera District of Pakhtunkhwa province (previously North-West Frontier Province), in British India.

With its BE2Cs and Farmans, during this time No. 31 Squadron RAF and No. 114 Squadron RAF took part in operations in the Third Anglo-Afghan War and being part of The Great Game, on the North-West Frontier and FATA. The bombing was done to ensure the patency of the Durand line border between Afghanistan and British India.

In September 1919 BE2s of the Royal Flying Corps were replaced by Bristol Fighters.

The No. 31 Squadron RAF and No. 114 Squadron RAF bombing of Kabul and FATA stopped with the signing of the Rawalpindi Agreement in Rawalpindi (signed on 8 August 1919 and amended on 22 November 1921) between British India and Afghanistan, celebrated as Afghanistan's National Day now.

No. 114 Squadron RAF was disbanded by being re-numbered No 28 on 1 April 1920.

But the Waziristan campaign (1936–1939) continued in FATA and Bannu Pakhtunkhwa against Faqir of Ipi, which included the use of aircraft such as Hawker Harts, Westland Wapitis, and Hawker Audaxs flying from Risalpur and Peshawar.

The No. 31 Squadron RAF conducted air support in the FATA campaign against Faqir of Ipi in Mir Ali and in Wanna, and in Pakhtunkhwa's district of Bannu.

Trouble flared up on 23 July 1938, when a lashkar launched a daring attack on the town of Bannu, Mir Ali and Wanna, killing up to 200 civilians and damaging a considerable amount of property. At the height of the campaign, some 60,000 regular and irregular troops were employed by the British in an effort to bring in control an estimated 4,000 hostile tribesmen of FATA.

In April 1939 the No. 31 Squadron RAF changed to the bomber and transport role.

During 1941, the No. 31 Squadron RAF began to concentrate on transport duties with seconded DC-2s. Returning to India the No. 31 Squadron RAF re-equipped with the Dakota.

After the Japanese invasion of Burma, No. 31 Squadron RAF flew missions between Calcutta and Rangoon dropping supplies for the XIVth Army.

After World War II the No. 31 Squadron RAF moved to Java. In 1946 the Squadron was disbanded in Java and reformed at PAF Base Masroor, Maripur Karachi. At the end of 1947 No. 31 Squadron RAF was again disbanded, but reformed in July 1948 in Britain.

During British rule, the British Army's 14/20th Hussars were garrisoned for two years at Risalpur, Nowshera Pakhtunkhwa until 1933.

It is stated that the army of 14th/20th Hussars stayed in Risalpur town of Nowshera Pakhtunkhwa until 1933. In fact, they never arrived for their tour of duty in British India until early in 1934.

Upon arriving from Egypt, where they had previously been stationed for two years, they disembarked in Karachi and immediately traveled to the town of Risalpur in district Nowshera North West Frontier Province and stayed there until late in 1936 whereupon they were transferred to Lucknow.

The Royal Horse Artillery were also stationed at Risalpur Town of District Nowshera of Pakhtunkhwa.

The airfield was formally established as PAF Station Risalpur, after the creation of Pakistan on 15 August 1947 with 20 officers, 21 trainees, 23 senior non commissioned officers (SNCOs) and 257 airmen. The airfield comprised only a handful of men and some equipment.

One month later, the Flying Training School was established here. Wing Commander Asghar Khan, later to become the first Air Chief of the PAF, took over as the first Officer Commanding of the school, with Harvard and Tiger Moth aircraft in the inventory.

Flt Lt M Khyber Khan, who later rose to the rank of Air Vice Marshal, and his student, Flight Cadet Akhtar, flew the first training sortie on 22 September 1947.

On 13 April 1948, the founder of Pakistan, Muhammad Ali Jinnah, visited Risalpur Flying Training School and raised its level to that of a college.

Risalpur thus became the genesis of PAF pilots. It became the only military academy of Pakistan to be visited by Jinnah. At this ceremony, Jinnah took the General Salute at the parade. Fighter aircraft from Peshawar Airbase, from the nearby Peshawar district of Pakhtunkhwa performed aerobatics at the event.

On 21 January 1967 President Ayub Khan elevated the status of the Pakistan Air Force College, Risalpur to that of a Pakistan Air Force Academy. Currently, it consists of five different components.

At the heart of the Pakistan Air Force since its inception, the Pakistan Air Force Academy, Risalpur's Nowshera Pakhtunkhwa, has bred generations of officers for the PAF and other branches of the Pakistani Armed Forces.

The Pakistan Air Force Academy at Nowshera Pakhtunkhwa was established in 1947.

== Demographics ==
=== Population ===
Historical population
Year	Pop.	±% p.a.
1951	9,981	—
1961	11,291	+1.24%
1972	12,136	+0.66%
1981	20,386	+5.93%
1998	31,416	+2.58%
2017	36,653	+0.81%
2023	36,074	−0.27%

As of the 2023 census, Risalpur had a population of 36,074.

=== Religion ===
Religious groups in Risalpur City (1911−1941) (Note: 1911-1941: Data for the entirety of the town of Risalpur, which included Risalpur Municipality and Risalpur Cantonment.)
Religious group	1911		1921		1931		1941	
Religious group	Pop.	%	Pop.	%	Pop.	%	Pop.	%
Islam	2,268	71.61%	2,721	32.02%	3,170	39.55%	3,506	38.93%
Hinduism (Note: 1931-1941: Including Ad-Dharmis)	716	22.61%	3,369	39.64%	2,900	36.18%	3,937	43.71%
Sikhism	177	5.59%	601	7.07%	314	3.92%	1,024	11.37%
Christianity	6	0.19%	1,808	21.27%	1,629	20.32%	333	3.7%
Zoroastrianism	0	0%	0	0%	3	0.04%	0	0%
Jainism	0	0%	0	0%	0	0%	—N/a	—N/a
Judaism	0	0%	0	0%	0	0%	0	0%
Buddhism	0	0%	0	0%	0	0%	—N/a	—N/a
Others	0	0%	0	0%	0	0%	207	2.3%
Total population	3,167	100%	8,499	100%	8,016	100%	9,007	100%

== Incidents ==
On 9 November 2007, unknown miscreants fired three rockets that landed near Risalpur in Nowshera District, without causing any damage to life or property.

== Schools ==
- College of Aeronautical Engineering NUST
- Military College of Engineering (M.C.E.), NUST, Risalpur Cantt
- Fazaia Degree College, Risalpur Cantt
- Nisar Shaheed Degree College, Risalpur Cantt
- Presentation Convent High School, Risalpur Cantt
- Federal Government (F.G.) Public High School, Risalpur Cantt
- Army Iqra Public School, Risalpur Cantt
- Government Higher Secondary School, Risalpur Cantt
- Federal Government (F.G.) Sapper Boys High School, Risalpur Cantt
- Federal Government (F.G.) Sapper Girls High School, Risalpur Cantt
- Saint Joseph High School, Risalpur Cantt
- The City School, Risalpur Cantt
- Beaconhouse School System, Risalpur Cantt
- Sir Syed Public School and College Risalpur Cantt
- MM School System Risalpur Cantt.

== Additional information ==
Due to the lack of quality educational institutions in Mardan and Nowshehra District many students travel daily to Risalpur in order to study at the relatively better educational institutions operated by the Armed Forces of Pakistan. The students who come to these institutions usually belong to the privileged class of the two districts, or their parents suffer through tremendous financial hardship in order to send their children to these schools.

There is no provincial Government High School or College for Girls in the area.

== Climate ==
Risalpur has a humid subtropical climate (Köppen: Cwa) which has hot and humid summers, and cold to mild winters.
