= Cass =

Cass may refer to:

== People and fictional characters ==
- Cass (surname), a list of people
- Cass (given name), a list of people and fictional characters
- Big Cass, ring name of wrestler William Morrissey
- Cass, in British band Skunk Anansie
- Cass, British singer, artist name of Brian Cassar
- Henri Cassini (1781–1832), French botanist, standard author abbreviation "Cass."
- Kevin Cassidy (born 1981), Gaelic footballer often referred to as "Cass"

== Places ==
=== United States ===
- Cass, Indiana, an unincorporated community
- Cass, Michigan, a ghost town
- Cass, West Virginia, a census-designated place
  - Cass Scenic Railroad State Park, in West Virginia
- Cass County (disambiguation)
- Bartow County, Georgia, formerly Cass County
- Cass Township (disambiguation)
- Fort Cass, in present-day Tennessee, 19th century US Army fortification

=== New Zealand ===
- Cass, New Zealand, a locality
- Cass (painting), a painting by Rita Angus

=== Greenland ===
- Cass Fjord

=== Multiple countries ===
- Cass Lake (disambiguation)
- Cass River (disambiguation)

== Schools ==
- Cass Business School, London
- Cass High School (disambiguation), several high schools
- Cass Technical High School, Detroit, Michigan

== CASS ==
- Chinese Academy of Social Sciences
- Centre for Aerospace and Security Studies
- Coding Accuracy Support System
- Committee for the Advancement of Scientific Skepticism, a Canadian organization
- Cargo Accounts Settlement Systems of the International Air Transport Association
- CASS microscopy : Collective Accumulation of Single Scattering microscopy
- Command Activated Sonobuoy System

== Other uses ==
- Cass (1978 film), an Australian television film
- Cass (2008 film), a British crime drama
- Cass, a brand of beer from the South Korean company Oriental Brewery
- Cass Community Social Services, an American nonprofit focused on political activism
- Cass identity model, theory of gay and lesbian identity development
- Cass (painting), a 1936 painting by Rita Angus
- Cass Review, an independent review of gender services in the United Kingdom

== See also ==
- Kass (disambiguation)
- CAS (disambiguation)
