= Kass (disambiguation) =

Kass is a surname.

Kass or L-Kass (Arabic: الكاس, romanized: L Kas; transliterated: al Kas; El-Kas; alKass; Elkass;), or variation, may also refer to:

== People ==
- Ḳāṣṣ, Muslim preachers in early Islam
- DJ Kass (born 1987), Dominican-American DJ
- Kass Fleisher (born 1959), U.S. writer
- Kass Morgan (born 1984), U.S. writer
- Ahmed El-Kass (Arabic: أحمد الكاس, born 1965), Egyptian soccer manager
- Saeed Al Kass (Arabic: سعيد حسن سالم الكاس), Emirati soccer player

== Places ==
- Qass, Azerbaijan
- Kass, Swat, Pakistan

== Mass media ==
- KASS, a radio station in Wyoming, United States
- Al Kass Sports Channels (Arabic: قناة الدوري والكأس), Qatari sports channels

== Other uses ==
- Kass, a character in The Legend of Zelda: Breath of the Wild

== See also ==
- Cass (disambiguation)
- Kas (disambiguation)
- Cup (disambiguation)
- Alka (disambiguation)
- Elka (disambiguation)
