= Rao Qamar Suleman =

Former Chief of Air Staff

Rao Qamar Suleman راؤ قمر سلیمان NI(M) HI(M) SI(M) SBt TI(M)

12th Chief of Air Staff
- In office 19 March 2009 – 19 March 2012
- President: Asif Ali Zardari
- Prime Minister: Yusuf Raza Gillani
- Preceded by: Tanvir Mahmood Ahmed
- Succeeded by: Tahir Rafique Butt

Personal details
- Born: 1954 (age 71–72) Lahore, Dominion of Pakistan

Military service
- Allegiance: Pakistan
- Branch/service: Pakistan Air Force
- Years of service: 1 June 1975 – 18 March 2012
- Rank: Air Chief Marshal
- Commands: PAF Base Peshawar; PAF Air War College; Southern Air Command; DG Air Force Strategic Command; DCAS (Operations); Chief of Air Staff
- Battles/wars: War in North-West Pakistan
- Awards: Nishan-e-Imtiaz (Military); Hilal-e-Imtiaz (Military); Sitara-e-Imtiaz (Military); Sitara-e-Basalat; Tamgha-i-Imtiaz (Military); Order of King Abdulaziz; Turkish Legion of Merit; Legion of Merit; Santos-Dumont Medal

Rao Qamar Suleman NI(M) HI(M) SI(M) SBt TI(M) (Urdu: راؤ قمر سلیمان) was the 12th Chief of Air Staff of the Pakistan Air Force. The four-star ranked general commanded the PAF from 2009 to 2012. Earlier, Suleman served as Deputy Chief of Air Staff of Operations. He was succeeded by Air Chief Marshal Tahir Rafique Butt as Chief of Air Staff on 7 March 2012.

== Early life and education ==
ACM Rao Qamar Suleman was initially trained at PAF Public School, Sargodha where he belonged to the 17th entry (851 – Sabre House). Thereafter, he joined the Pakistan Air Force Academy, Risalpur, in 1972 and was commissioned in the Pakistan Air Force as a fighter pilot on 1 June 1975, in the 59th GD(P) Course.

Suleman is a graduate of the PAF Air War College. He holds a master's degree in defense and strategic studies from National Defence College, Islamabad. He has more than 3400 command hours to his credit. He is a Qualified Flying Instructor (QFI) and has been an instructor at the Combat Commanders' School. He has served in the Turkish as well as UAE Air forces.

=== Command and staff appointments ===
ACM Suleman is an accomplished fighter pilot with rich experience in fighter aircraft. He has commanded an elite fighter squadron, wing and base that includes No. 15 Squadron, No. 31 Wing, PAF Base Peshawar and Southern Air Command.

Suleman was promoted to "Air Vice Marshal" on 9 October 2003 and to "Air Marshal" on 15 November 2007.

In staff jobs, he served as directing staff (DS) at PAF Air War College and later became Commandant of Air War College. He served as deputy director at Operations Branch; assistant chief of staff (plans), assistant chief or air staff (evaluation) and deputy inspector general of Pakistan Air Force at air headquarters. In senior staff appointments, Air Marshal has the distinction of having served as Director-general Air Force Strategic Command and Deputy chief of air staff (operations) at the air headquarters, Islamabad.

=== DCAS (O) ===
As Deputy Chief of Air Staff Operations "DCAS (O)", Suleman was responsible for all the operations of the PAF. He is the architect of anti-surgical strike strategy, which barred India from carrying out strikes against Pakistan in the aftermath of the Mumbai attacks. In this capacity, he planned the response to Indian Air Force threat of surgical strikes against Pakistan in the wake of terrorists strike at Mumbai. He deployed force to face Indian threat in November 2008, which thwarted the Indian Air Force plans of surgical strikes.

=== Chief of Air Staff ===
As Chief of Air Staff, ACM Suleman is credited with developing PAF's counter terrorism policy, which was a new role. To improve the operational readiness and train in this new role, he conducted the largest number of operational exercises for PAF such as High Mark 2010, Azm-e-Nau, Saffron Bandit, etc., during his command. He also planned operational training exercises with other modern air forces like USAF (Red & Green Flags), Turkish Air Force (Anatolian Eagle and Indus Viper), UAE Air force (ATLC), PLA Air force (Shaheen I), Royal Saudi Air Force (Al Saqoor), Jordanian Air Force (Falcon Meet), etc.

During his tenure, PAF flew maximum with least accidents due to his emphasis on flight safety. In 2010, there was not a single accident despite extensive operational exercises, overseas deployments and maximum flying, making 2010 an accident-free year for the first time in history of PAF.

Several new types of aircraft and capabilities were added to the PAF fleet and operationalized during his tenure. He started JF 17 aircraft production at Pakistan Aeronautical Complex Kamra and raised two JF 17 aircraft Squadrons. He introduced JF 17 to the world by sending it in various air shows such as Farnborough Air Show (UK), Zhuhai Air Show (China) and Dubai Air Show (UAE). It was also displayed in "Air Show Turkiye," the Centennial Celebration to celebrate 100 years of Turkish Air Force. He also demonstrated the operational capabilities of the new aircraft by its participation in Fire Power display in front of Air attaches, foreign air force observers and aviators from all over the world.

== Role in war on terror ==
ACM Suleman is the architect of counter terrorism policy. Under his command, PAF successfully achieved its objectives of destroying the Taliban infrastructure, and killing the terrorists during the aerial operations. He enabled PAF to defeat the terrorists successfully through new operational trainings and exercises. He led successful aerial operations in Swat and FATA against terrorists.

He is also credited for developing close relations between PAF and the Pakistani Army. This resulted in close coordination between the services that resulted in successful joint operations against terrorists and enabled the military forces to engage and destroy the terrorists in remote areas that were inaccessible. The Air Force squadrons are currently engaged in the military operations along with Pakistan Army.

== Medals and awards ==
In recognition of his meritorious and exceptionally dedicated services, he has received the Medal of Excellence Tamgha-e-Imtiaz (Military), Star of Good Conduct Sitara-e-Basalat, Star of Excellence Sitara-e-Imtiaz, Crescent of Excellence Hilal-e-Imtiaz (Military) and Order of Excellence Nishan-e-Imtiaz (Military) among many other medals and awards.

Based on his bravery, leadership and successful achievements, ACM Suleman was awarded the Legion of Merit (Degree of Commander) by the United States of America, King Abdul Aziz Medal Class I by the Kingdom of Saudi Arabia, Order of Merit of the Republic of Turkey by Republic of Turkey, and Medal of Merit Santos-Dumont by the Federative Republic of Brazil.

=== Awards and decorations ===
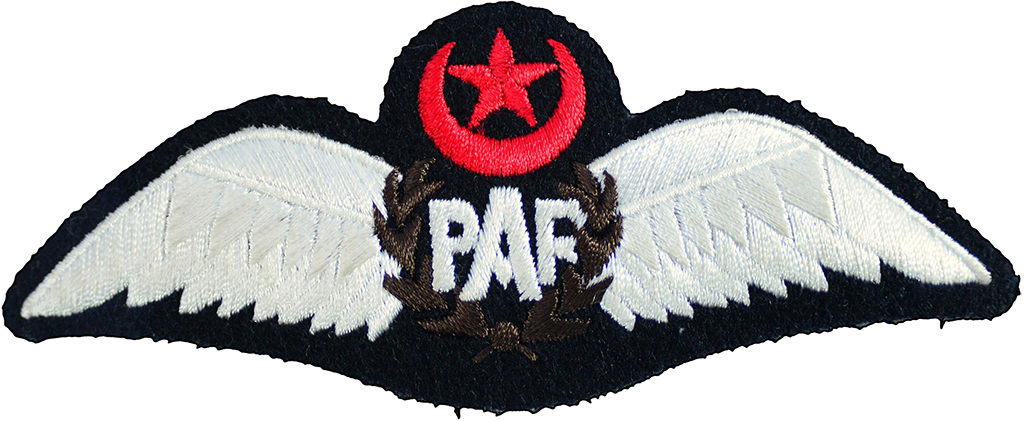

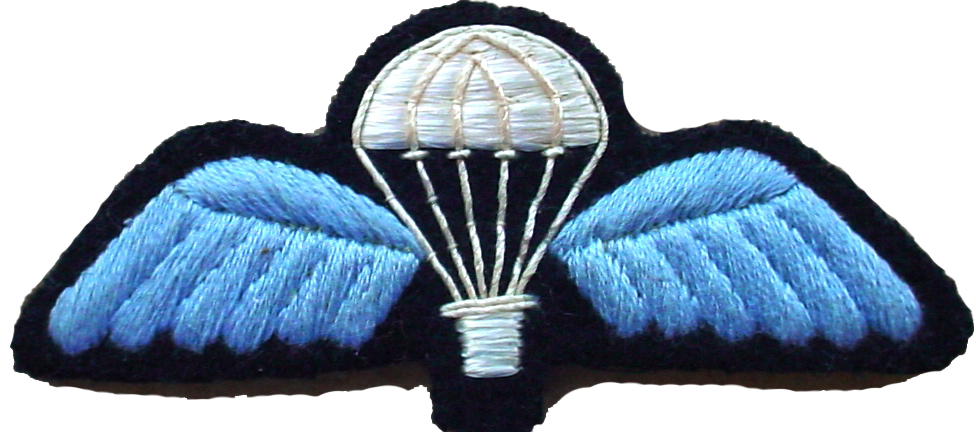

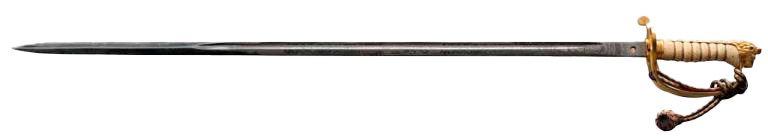

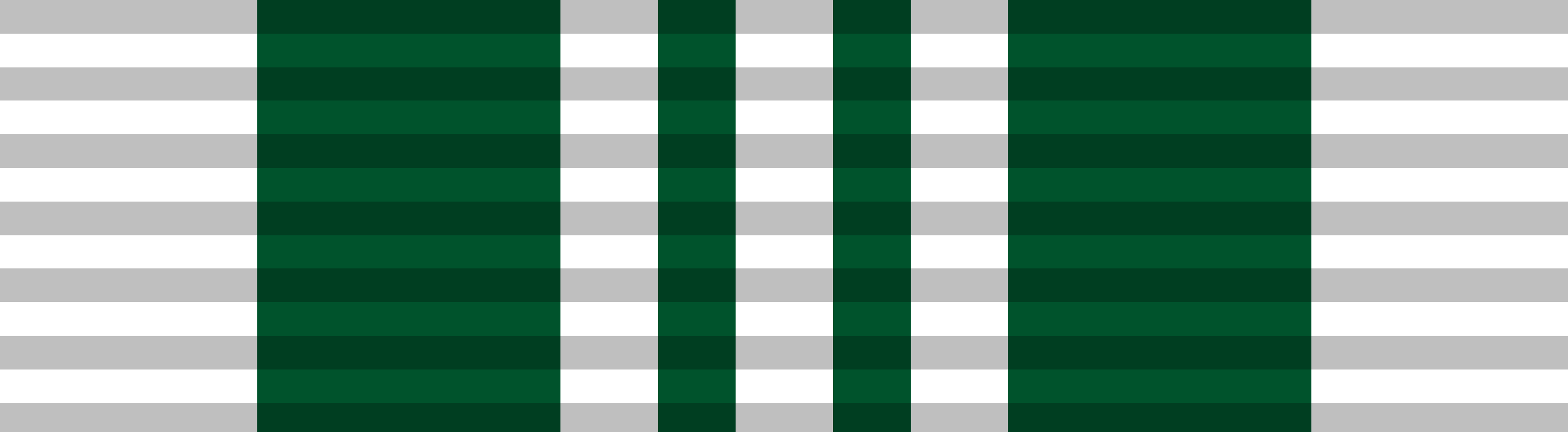

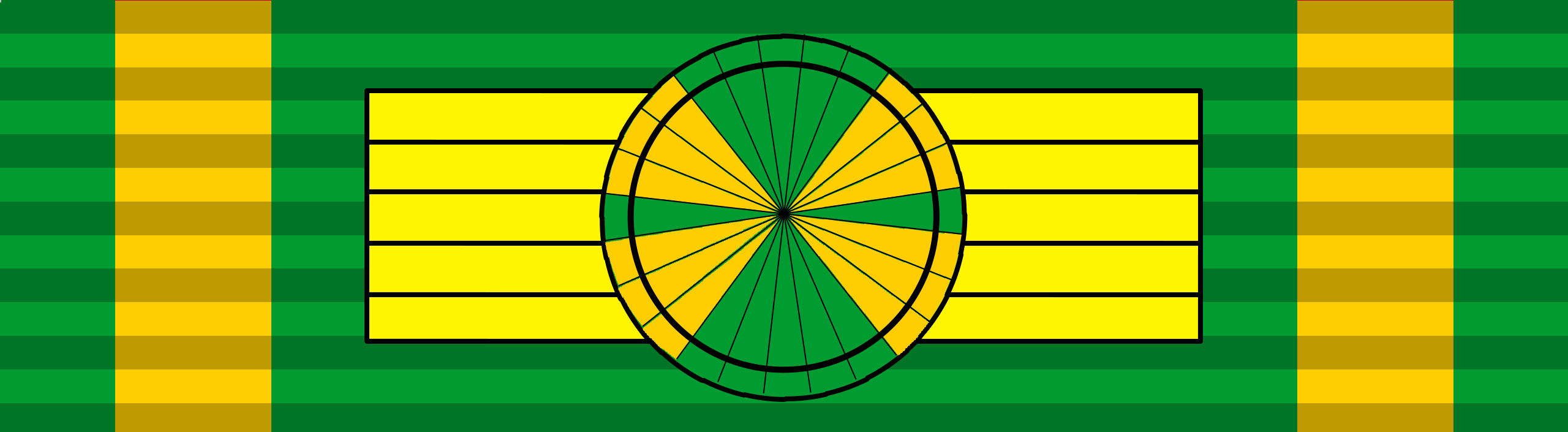

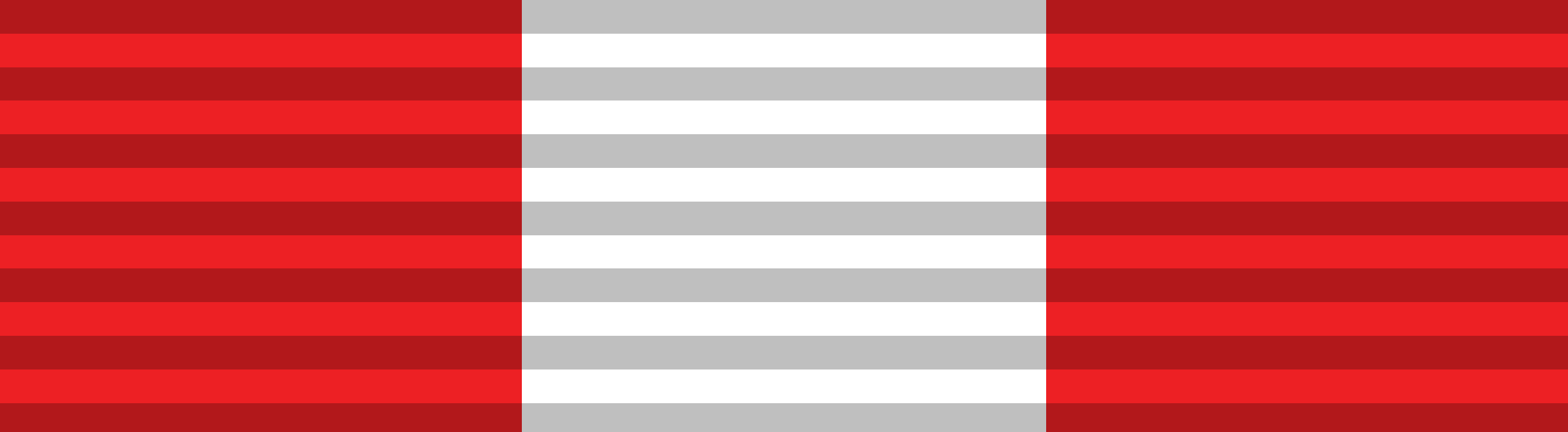

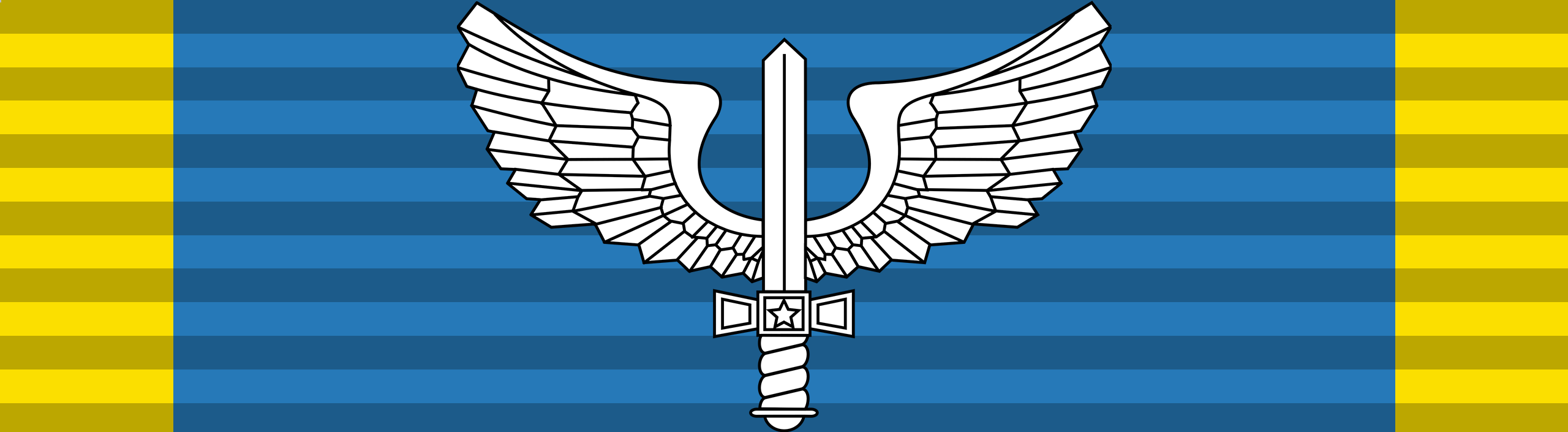

PAF GD(P) Badge RED (More than 3000 flying hours)
Parachutist Badge
Combat Commanders' School Sargodha Instructor's Sword
Nishan-e-Imtiaz (Military) (Order of Excellence)	Hilal-e-Imtiaz (Military) (Crescent of Excellence)	Sitara-e-Imtiaz (Military) (Star of Excellence)	Sitara-e-Basalat (Star of Good Conduct)
Tamgha-e-Imtiaz (Military) (Medal of Excellence)	Tamgha-e-Baqa (Nuclear Test Medal) 1998	Tamgha-e-Istaqlal Pakistan (Escalation with India Medal) 2002	10 Years Service Medal
20 Years Service Medal	30 Years Service Medal	35 Years Service Medal	Tamgha-e-Sad Saala Jashan-e- Wiladat-e-Quaid-e-Azam (100th Birth Anniversary of Muhammad Ali Jinnah) 1976
Hijri Tamgha (Hijri Medal) 1979	Jamhuriat Tamgha (Democracy Medal) 1988	Qarardad-e-Pakistan Tamgha (Resolution Day Golden Jubilee Medal) 1990	Tamgha-e-Salgirah Pakistan (Independence Day Golden Jubilee Medal) 1997
Order of King Abdul Aziz (1st Class) (Saudi Arabia) 2010	Turkish Legion of Merit (Turkey) 2010	The Legion of Merit (Degree of Commander) (United States) 2010	Santos-Dumont Merit Medal (Brazil) 2011

=== Foreign decorations ===
Foreign Awards
Saudi Arabia	Order of King Abdul Aziz (1st Class)
Turkey	Turkish Legion of Merit
United States	The Legion of Merit (Degree of Commander)
Brazil	Santos-Dumont Merit Medal

Military offices
Preceded by Tanvir Mahmood Ahmed	Chief of Air Staff; 2009 – 2012	Succeeded by Tahir Rafique Butt
