= Kaleem Saadat =

Pakistani air marshal (born 1951)

Kaleem Saadat NI(M) HI(M) SI(M) TI(M) LoH
- کلیم سعادت

10th Chief of Air Staff
- In office March 18, 2003 – March 18, 2006
- Preceded by: ACM Mushaf Ali Mir
- Succeeded by: ACM Tanvir Ahmad

Personal details
- Born: 12 December 1951 (age 74) Faisalabad, Punjab Province, West Pakistan (now-Pakistan)

Military service
- Allegiance: Pakistan
- Branch/service: Pakistan Air Force
- Years of service: 1971–2006
- Rank: Air Chief Marshal
- Commands: Chief of Air Staff; Deputy Chief of Air Staff (Operations); Deputy Chief of Air Staff (Personnel); AOC PAF Base Peshawar; Chief Instructor ND Wing at NDC; OC No. 14 Squadron Tail choppers No. 32 Wing
- Battles/wars: Indo-Pakistani War of 1971; 2001 India–Pakistan standoff War in North-West Pakistan
- Awards: Nishan-e-Imtiaz (Military); Hilal-e-Imtiaz (Military); Sitara-e-Imtiaz (Military); Tamgha-i-Imtiaz (Military); Turkish Legion of Merit; Legion of Honour; Order of King AbdulAziz; Santos-Dumont Medal

Kaleem Saadat NI(M) HI(M) SI(M) TI(M) LoH (Urdu: کلیم سعادت ; b. 12 December 1951) is a retired four-star air officer in the Pakistan Air Force who served as the Chief of Air Staff from 18 March 2003 until retiring on 20 March 2006. His appointment came after an air crash that killed Air Chief Marshal Mushaf Ali Mir, the air chief, along with several other high-ranking Air Force officers on 19 February 2003. He is the President of the Centre for Aerospace and Security Studies.

== Biography ==
Kaleem Saadat was born in Lyallpur (now Faisalabad), Punjab in Pakistan into a Punjabi-speaking Rajput family on 12 December 1951. He was educated at the Air Force Public School in Sargodha and matriculated 14th out of 697 in his class in 1969. He entered in the Air Force Academy in Risalpur and passed out with the class of 51st GD(P) course, along with his close friend and classmate Rashid Minhas. Rashid Minhas was the trainee pilot who lost his life preventing his flight instructor from defecting to India in 1971 when their struggled for control of their aircraft caused it to crash.

Saadat took the Basic Weapons Course, Turkey; the Flying Instructors' Course from Risalpur; the Staff College and Air War Course from the PAF Air War College; L'ESGI and CSI from the École Militaire in France; and the National Defence Course from the National Defence College, Islamabad. His foreign tours include: Exchange Pilot in Turkey (1977–78); Deputation to Algeria (1980–83); War Course at the École Militaire, Paris, France (1989–90).

== Command and staff assignments ==
During his Air Force career, Saadat commanded No. 14 OCU Squadron, No. 32 Wing at PAF Base Masroor, and PAF Base Peshawar.

His staff and instructional appointments include assistant commandant of the College of Flying Training at PAF Academy, director of plans at AHQ, chief instructor at the National Defence College, Islamabad, and deputy chief of air staff (operations) at AHQ.

== PAF Air Chief ==
=== Death of Air Chief Mushaf Ali Mir ===
On 20 February 2003, the PAF Chief Air Chief Marshal Mushaf Ali Mir died in a plane crash when the Fokker he, his wife and fifteen other high-ranking officers were flying in crashed near Kohat in northwestern Pakistan, killing all the passengers on board. Thereafter, the then vice chief, Air Marshal Syed Qaiser Hussain, was made the acting Air Chief of the PAF. On 19 March 2003, Air Marshal Kaleem Saadat, then deputy chief of air staff (personnel), was chosen over Hussain and Air Marshal Sarfraz Arshad Toor, air officer commanding, Air Defence Command (ADC), as the new chief of Pakistan Air Force.

=== Achievements ===
The JF-17 Thunder program under Kaleem Saadat was throttled into full gear. It was during this time that the aircraft prototype was unveiled; it flew some hours, with semi-production starting in 2005. The Air Headquarters were shifted to its permanent location in Islamabad after having stayed in Karachi, Peshawar and Rawalpindi. The PAF achieved its best Flight Safety record of its history when in the Year 2004, it had the lowest major aircraft accident rate. The PAF had the largest ever flying operations Exercise Highmark 2005 after nearly ten years' gap as well as holding its first ever tri-service wargame titled Tempest-I.

Saadat is a recipient of Tamgha-e-Imtiaz (Military), Sitara-e-Imtiaz (Military), Hilal-e-Imtiaz (Military) and Nishan-e-Imtiaz (Military). In addition, he was decorated with the French Légion d'honneur (Legion of Honour) on 13 July 2005 for the "excellent cooperation existing between French defence industries related to aeronautics and the Pakistan Air Force, which happens to maintain the most important fleet of Mirages in the world, after France, and acknowledges the impulse given personally by the Chief of Air Staff."

=== Retirement ===
In March 2006, ACM Kaleem Saadat's three-year term expired and he was replaced by the then Vice Chief of Air Staff, Air Marshal Tanvir Mahmood Ahmed, as the air chief.

== Centre for Aerospace and Security Studies ==
In 2019, ACM Kaleem Saadat became the first president of the Centre for Aerospace and Security Studies (CASS), which is an independent research think tank founded by the Pakistan Air Force with specializations in the domains of aerospace, aviation, security, doctrine, and economics. CASS was inaugurated by Air Chief Marshall Mujahid Anwar Khan in July 2019.

== Awards and decorations ==
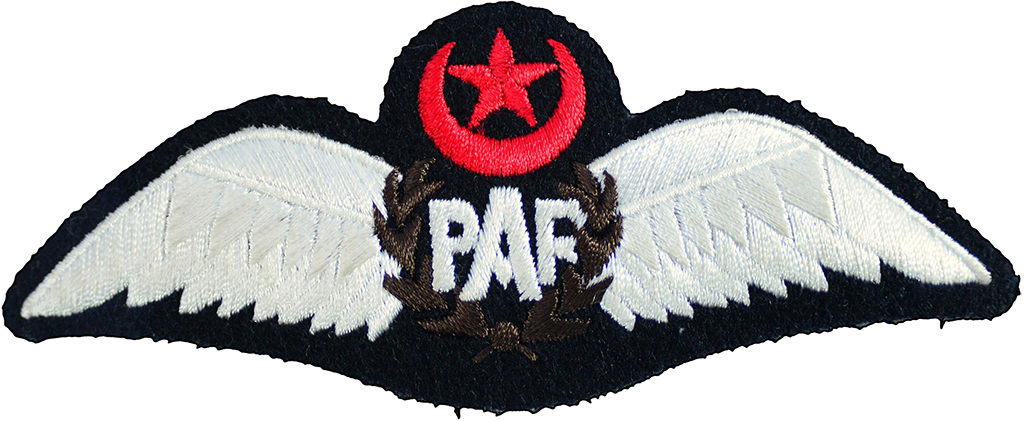

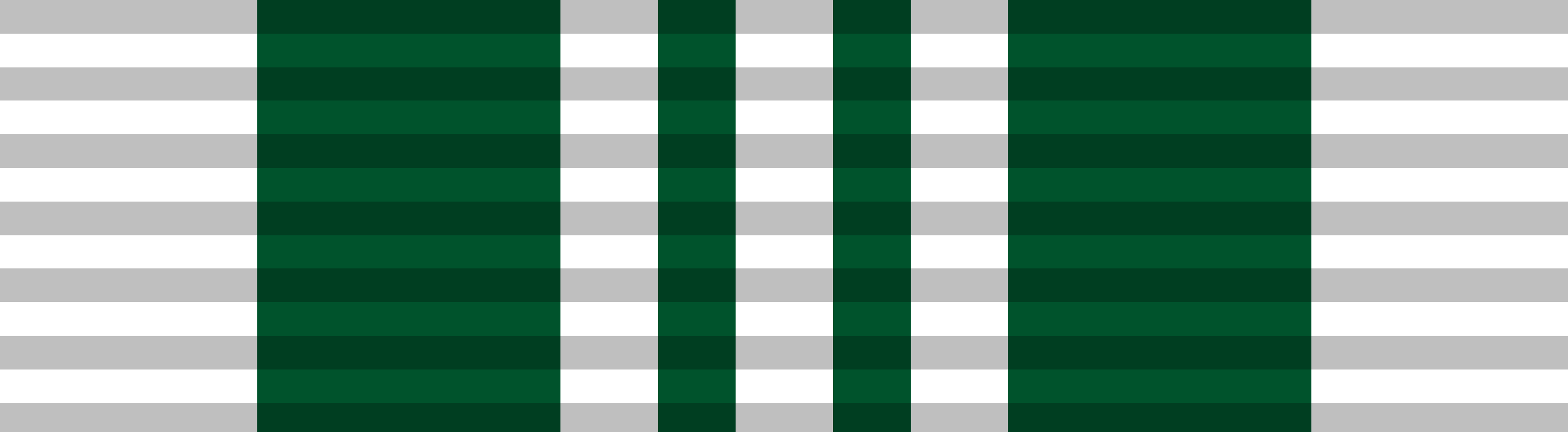

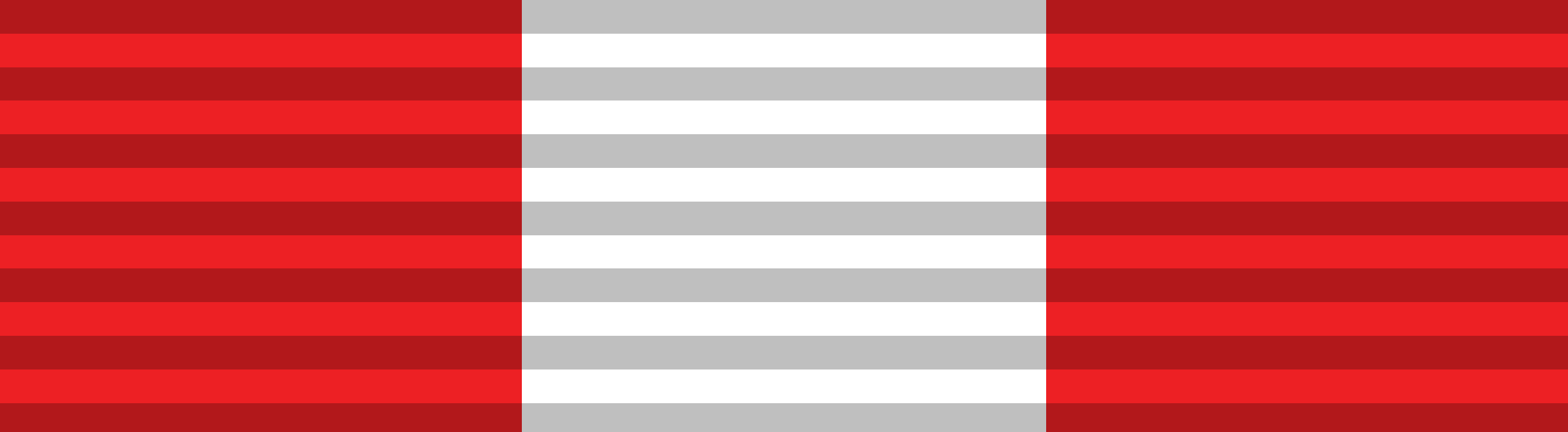

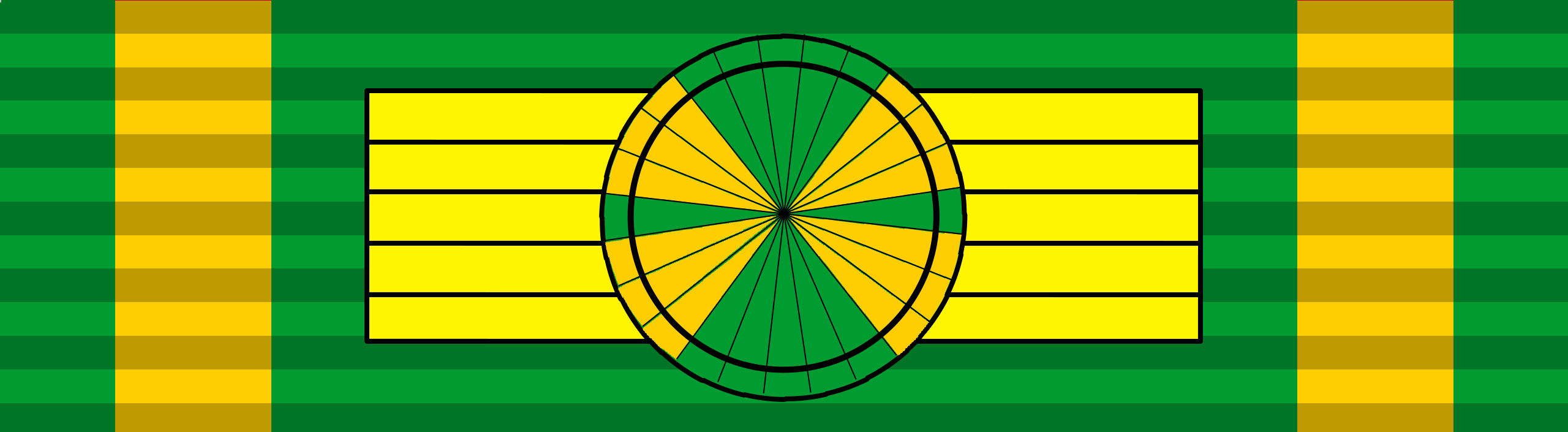

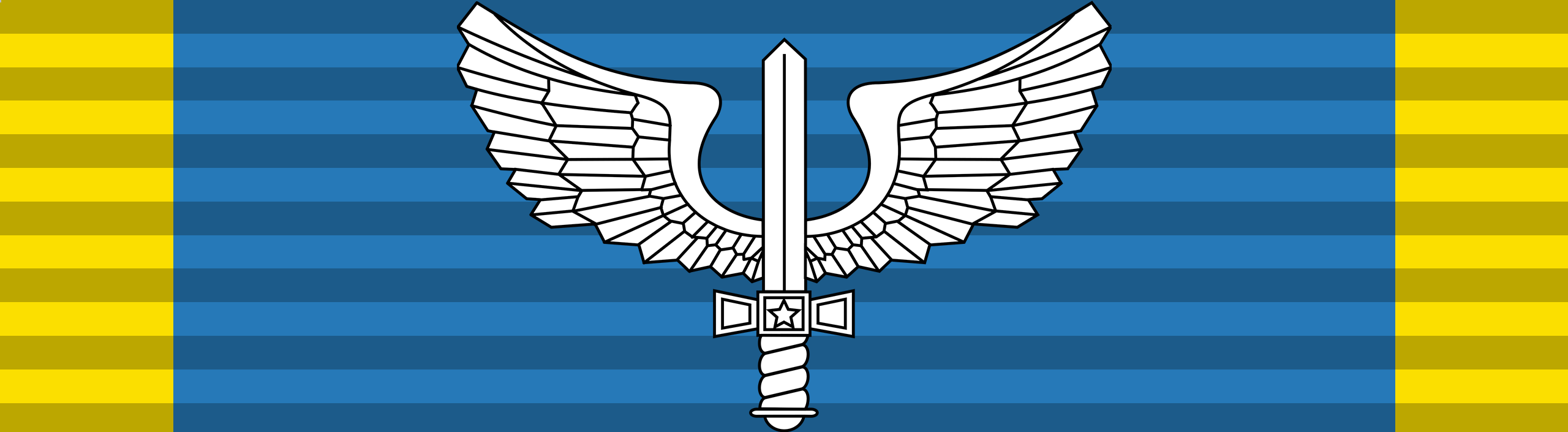

PAF GD(P) Badge RED (More than 3000 Flying Hours)
	Nishan-e-Imtiaz (Military) (Order of Excellence)		
Hilal-e-Imtiaz (Military) (Crescent of Excellence)	Sitara-e-Imtiaz (Military) (Star of Excellence)	Tamgha-e-Imtiaz (Military) (Medal of Excellence)	Sitara-e-Harb 1971 War (War Star 1971)
Tamgha-e-Jang 1971 War (War Medal 1971)	Tamgha-e-Baqa (Nuclear Test Medal) 1998	Tamgha-e-Istaqlal Pakistan (Escalation with India Medal) 2002	10 Years Service Medal
20 Years Service Medal	30 Years Service Medal	35 Years Service Medal	Tamgha-e-Sad Saala Jashan-e- Wiladat-e-Quaid-e-Azam (100th Birth Anniversary of Muhammad Ali Jinnah) 1976
Hijri Tamgha (Hijri Medal) 1979	Jamhuriat Tamgha (Democracy Medal) 1988	Qarardad-e-Pakistan Tamgha (Resolution Day Golden Jubilee Medal) 1990	Tamgha-e-Salgirah Pakistan (Independence Day Golden Jubilee Medal) 1997
Turkish Legion of Merit (Turkey)	Legion of Honour Officer Class (France) 2005	Order of King AbdulAziz (Saudi Arabia)	Santos-Dumont Merit Medal (Brazil) 2006

=== Foreign Decorations ===
Foreign Awards
Turkey	Turkish Legion of Merit
France	Legion of Honour - Officer Class
Saudi Arabia	Order of King Abdul Aziz (Class I)
Brazil	Santos-Dumont Merit Medal

Military offices
Preceded by Mushaf Ali Mir	Chief of Air Staff; 2003–2006	Succeeded by Tanvir Mahmood Ahmed
