= Kash =

Kash or KASH may refer to:

== Places ==
- Nashua Municipal Airport (ICAO airport code KASH) Nashua, New Hampshire, United States

=== Canada ===
- The local name of Kashechewan First Nation, a First Nation community in northern Ontario

=== Iran ===
- Kash, Iran, a village in Alborz Province
- Kash, Hormozgan, a village in Hormozgan Province

== People, characters ==
=== Surname ===
- Amos Kash (1868–1948), Russian sport shooter
- Daniel Kash (born 1959), Canadian actor and film director
- Dima Kash (born 1989), Russian-born singer, songwriter and rapper
- Linda Kash (born 1961), Canadian actress
- Tim Kash (born 1982), British television presenter

=== Nickname ===
- Cassius Marcellus Coolidge (1844–1934), American painter noted for his Dogs Playing Poker series
- Kash Ali (born 1992), British boxer
- Kash Beauchamp (born 1963), American baseball coach
- Kash Farooq (born 1996), Pakistani-born Scottish boxer
- Kash Gill (born 1966), British kickboxer
- Kash Heed (born 1955), Canadian politician and police officer, first Indo-Canadian police chief in Canada
- Kash Patel (born 1980), American lawyer and director of the Federal Bureau of Investigation

=== Stage or ring name ===
- Kash Doll, American rapper Arkeisha Antoinette Knight (fl. 2014–present)
- BRS Kash, American rapper Kenneth Duncan Jr. (born 1993)
- J Kash, American songwriter/record producer Jacob Kasher Hindlin (born 1983)
- Lady Kash, Singaporean rapper/songwriter Kalaivani Nagaraj (born c. 1990)
- MC Kash, Kashmiri rapper Roushan Illahi (born 1990)
- Kid Kash, ring name of American mixed martial artist and professional wrestler David Tyler Cash (born 1969)

=== Characters ===
- Kash, a character in many GEICO commercials from the late 2000s to the early 2010s

== Radio stations ==
- KASH-FM, licensed to Anchorage, Alaska, United States
- KOPB (AM), licensed to Eugene, Oregon, United States, which had the call sign KASH until April 1985

== Other uses ==
- KASH (software), the command line interface of the KANT computer algebra system
- KASH domain, the conserved C-terminal protein regions
- Slang term among cannabis users for hashish covered with kief
- Kash or Kans grass, Saccharum spontaneum, a tall grass used for thatching and fencing in South Asia

== See also ==
- Kaas (disambiguation)
- Kas (disambiguation)
- Khash (disambiguation)
- Cash (disambiguation)
