= Tanvir Mahmood Ahmed =

Pakistan Air Force officer

Tanvir Mahmood Ahmed NI(M) HI(M) SI(M) SBt
- تنویر محمود احمد

18th Chief of Air Staff
- In office 18 March 2006 – 18 March 2009
- President: Pervez Musharraf; Asif Ali Zardari
- Prime Minister: Shaukat Aziz; Yusuf Raza Gillani
- Preceded by: Kaleem Saadat
- Succeeded by: Rao Qamar Suleman

Personal details
- Born: 1 February 1952 (age 74) Lahore, Punjab Province, West Pakistan
- Relations: Married

Military service
- Allegiance: Pakistan
- Branch/service: Pakistan Air Force
- Years of service: 1969–2009
- Rank: Air Chief Marshal
- Unit: CCS Mirage Squadron Skybolts
- Commands: Chief of Air Staff; Vice Chief of Air Staff; Deputy Chief of Air Staff (Operations); Deputy Chief of Air Staff (Administration); Base Commander PAF Base Sargodha; Air OfficerCommanding Pakistan Air Force Academy; Officer Commanding. Mirage Squadron, Combat's Commander School
- Battles/wars: Indo-Pakistani War of 1971; Indo-Pakistani War of 1999; 2001-2002 India-Pakistan standoff War in North-West Pakistan
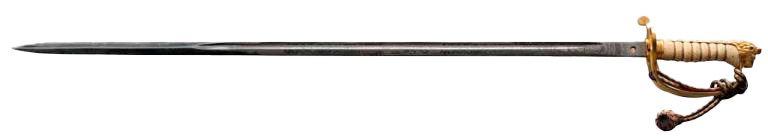
- Awards: Nishan-e-Imtiaz (Military); Hilal-e-Imtiaz (Military); Sitara-e-Imtiaz (Military); Sitara-e-Basalat; Turkish Legion of Merit; Aeronautical Merit Order; Order of King Abdulaziz; Military Merit Order; Military Order of Oman CCS Instructor's Sword

Tanvir Mahmood Ahmed NI(M) HI(M) SI(M) SBt (Urdu: تنویر محمود احمد;) is a retired air chief of the Pakistan Air Force who was the Chief of the Air Staff from 2006 to 2009. He was succeeded by Rao Qamar Suleman on 18 March 2009.

== Initial training and education ==
Tanvir Ahmed got his initial education from Central Model High school in Lahore, and subsequently, he did his F Sc from PAF Public School Sargodha where he belonged to 15th entry (767 – Fury House). Thereafter, he joined PAF Academy, Risalpur in 1969 and was commissioned in Pakistan Air Force as a fighter pilot on 15 April 1972 in the 53rd GD(P) Course. During his training at Risalpur, he flew and qualified as a jet pilot on T-37 aircraft.

== Air Force career ==
Air Marshal Tanvir is a Qualified Flying Instructor (QFI) and a graduate of Combat Commanders School (CCS). He has commanded the CCS Mirage Squadron, No. 38 Flying Wing, PAF Base Sargodha and his alma mater the PAF Academy, Risalpur. He has flown the American F-86 Sabre, Chinese MiG-15, F-6, F-7, French Mirage-3 and Mirage-5. Additionally, he flew the F-16 Fighting Falcon aircraft during his last 20 years of service in the PAF. He has also flown many training aircraft and has vast experience as a flying / fighter instructor.

The Air Marshal has also served in United Arab Emirates Air Force as a fighter instructor pilot during 1979 - 1983.

== Staff commands ==
As a Wing Commander (Lt Col) Tanvir served as deputy director in the Operations branch at AHQs before serving as Personal Staff Officer (PSO) with two Chiefs of Air Staff. As an Air Commodore, he had a lengthy tenure as Chief Project Director of the F-16 system. At senior staff assignments, Tanvir first served as Deputy Chief of Air Staff for Administration and then Operations branch. Before taking over the PAF, he was the Vice Chief of Air Staff for over 2 1/2 years. He took over as VCAS on 13 October 2003.

Tanvir M. Ahmed was promoted to Air Vice Marshal in January 2000 and to Air Marshal rank on 7 August 2002.

== Chief of Air Staff ==
He took over as the 18th Chief of Air Staff (CAS), PAF on 18 March 2006, when the previous chief completed his three-year term. Having been in the office of Vice Chief for well over two years, Tanvir was ready to role out his vision and plan for the PAF for the next three years. His vast and varied experience helped him in preparing a thorough and very ambitious plan for the PAF. He wished to see the PAF truly transitioning into the 21st century along with procurement of essential hardware and development of infrastructure. His motto for the PAF was To-do-more-with-less and build PAF as a lean, very efficient and hard hitting Air Force. Towards these objectives, he launched a massive drive to bring the entire working/functioning of the PAF online and fully integrated. Procurement of new generation F-16s (Block-52), Spada SAMs, Chinese AWACS, Swedish AEW&C, locally upgraded/maintained and operationalized Air Defense system, Retrieval of Peace Gate-IV F-16s from the USAF, complete upgradation of older F-16 fleet to most modern version, procurement of highly potent Beyond Visual Range AAMs along with host of other weapons from the US, High Tech Simulators, induction and local manufacturing capability of UAVs, a highly versatile Automated Inventory Management System and local manufacturing of Block-1 of the JF-17 weapon system were some of the major inductions that were contracted by him and in due course inducted in the PAF. Other than these new procurements to make PAF a very potent force, Tanvir was also responsible for operationalization of strategic capability for the PAF. This he achieved over a period of five years while concurrently holding the position of DG, AWC along with his primary responsibilities in the PAF. In addition to the above, Tanvir focused on developing and upgrading physical infrastructure, both operational and domestic. He especially built a lot of accommodation for the low paid employees in addition to building a major new air base for housing of new F-16s and upgrading Skardu as a fully functional air base. He had a keen eye for the welfare of PAF personnel and built hospitals in Karachi and Lahore. By bringing the PAF online, he streamlined all of the budgeting, logistics, procurements and accounting systems of the PAF.

=== Criticism of US drone attacks inside Pakistan ===
Air Marshal Tanvir Mahmood Ahmad during his tenure expressed PAF's capability to be able to stop US drone attacks inside Pakistan as he considered it a violation of Pakistan's sovereignty. However, in his opinion such military actions needed approval from the government, before PAF could go on to take such action. Saying at one point: "The decision as to whether or not we want to start a war [with the US] will have to be made by the nation and the government."

=== National Girl Child Day photograph ===
Air Chief Marshal Tanvir Mahmood Ahmad appeared in a full-page newspaper advertisement (see External Links below) taken out by the government of India's Ministry of Women and Child Development to mark the National Girl Child Day. Krishna Tirath, Minister of Women and Child Development, apologised on behalf of her ministry for publishing a photograph of a former Pakistan Air Force chief in a government advertisement and said an inquiry will ascertain who was responsible for it. Ahmed, upon learning of the publication, "wasn't aware about this [and felt it was] an innocent mistake".

== Awards and decorations ==
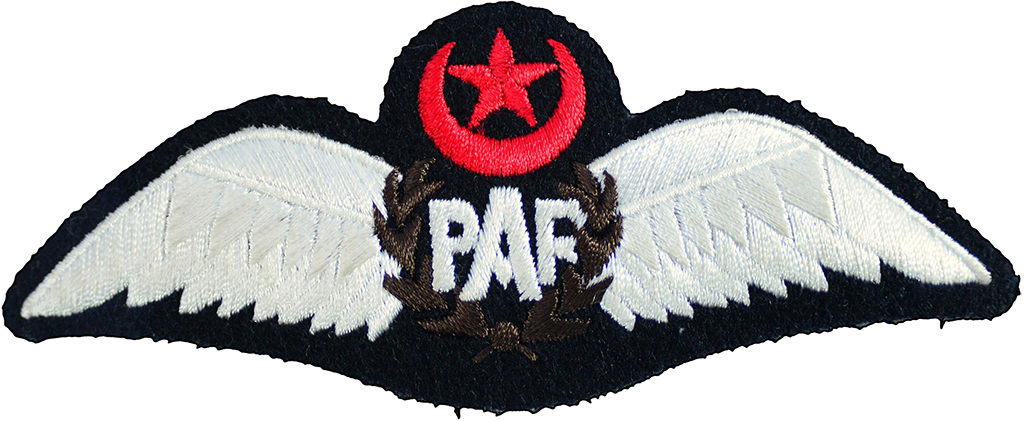

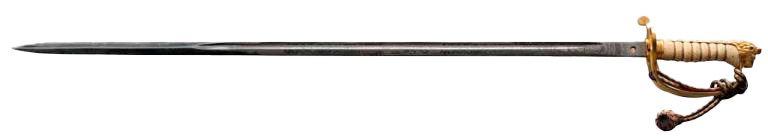

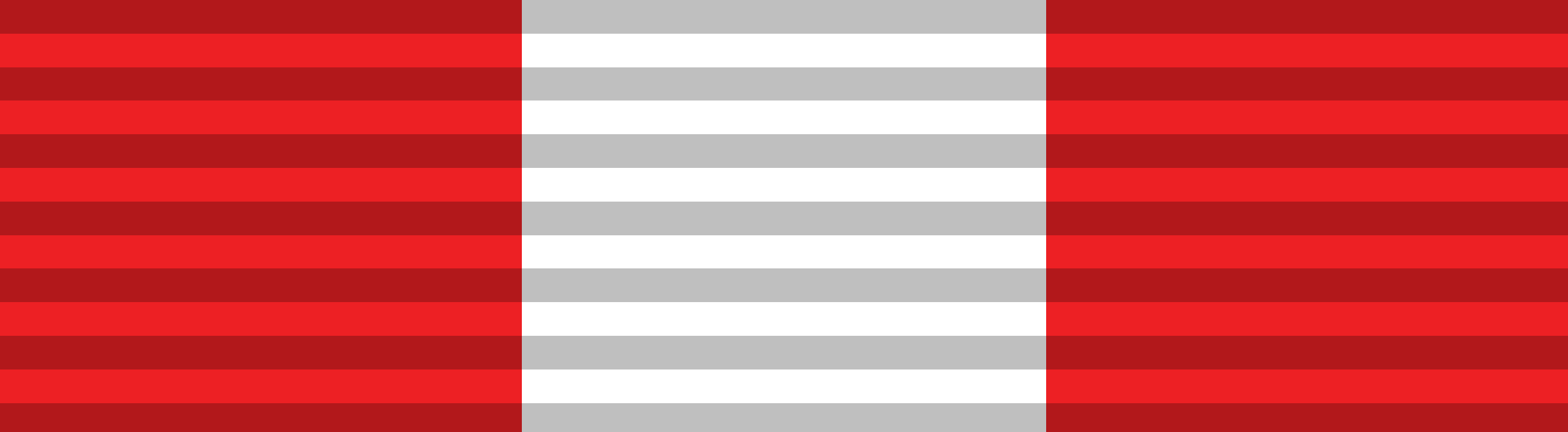

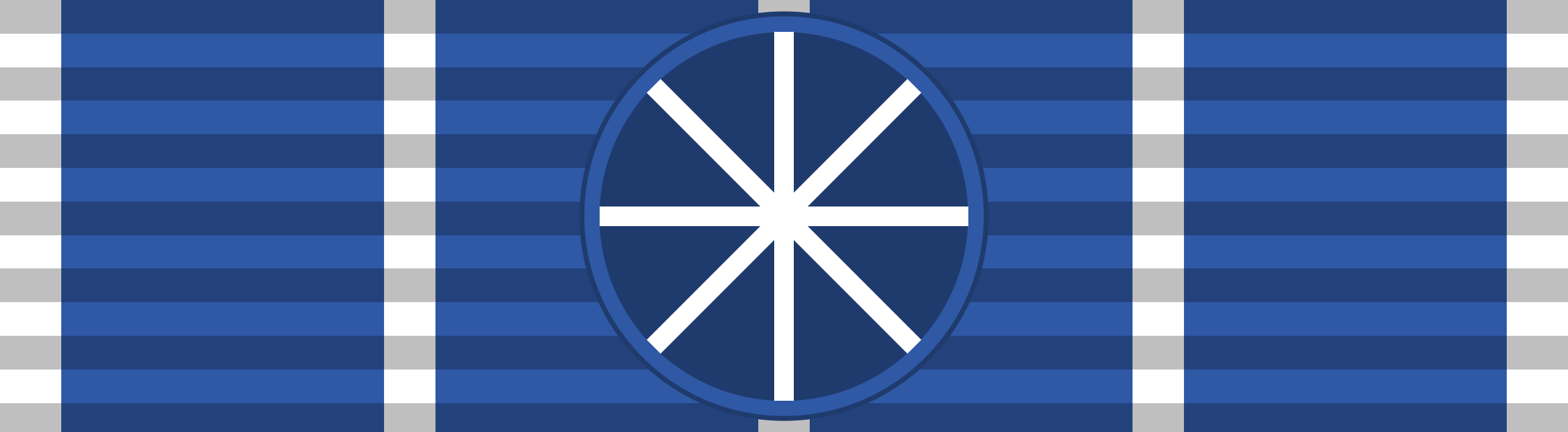

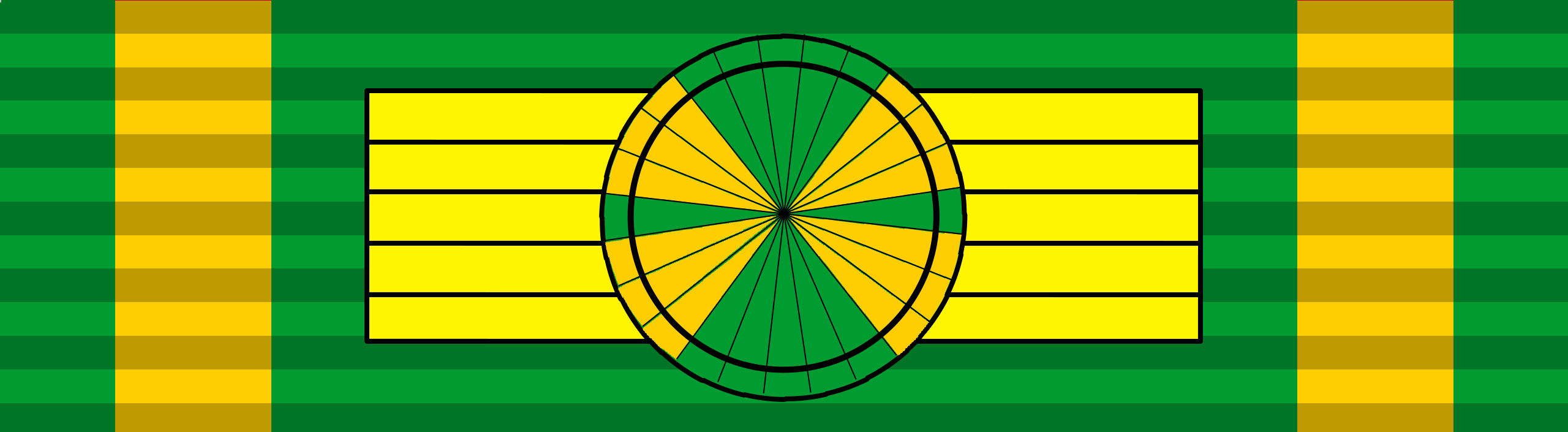

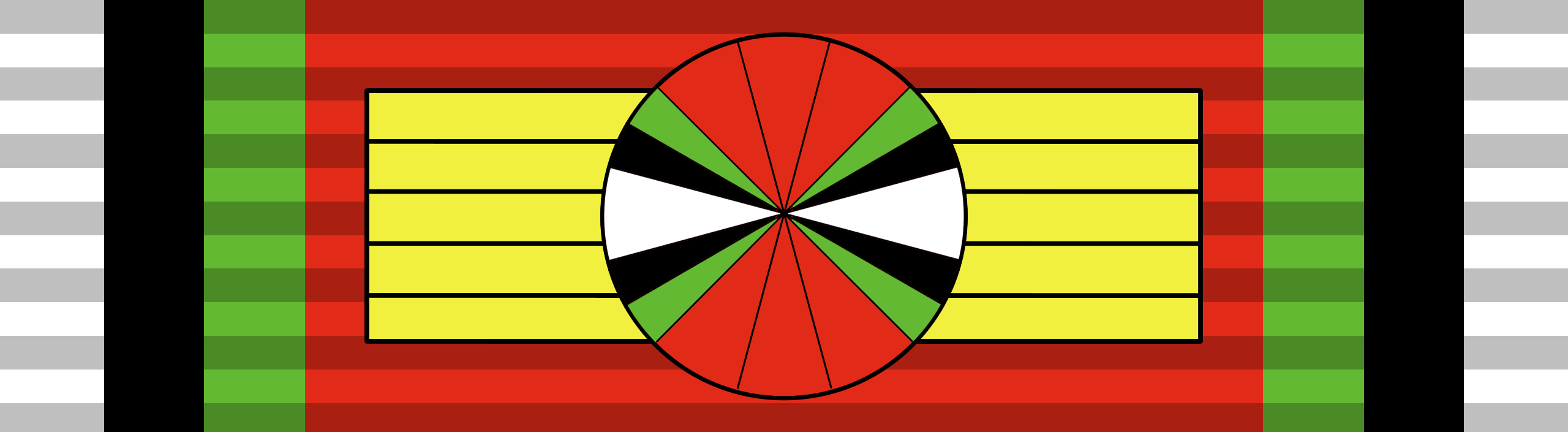

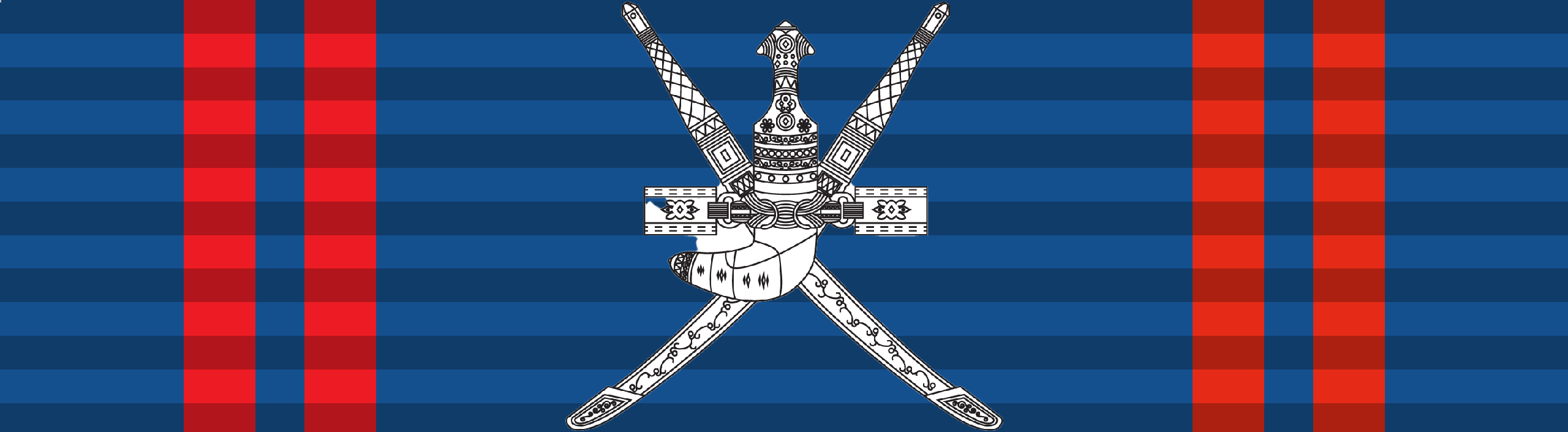

PAF GD(P) Badge RED (More than 3000 Flying Hours)
Combat Commanders' School Sargodha Instructor's Sword
	Nishan-e-Imtiaz (Military) (Order of Excellence)	Hilal-e-Imtiaz (Military) (Crescent of Excellence)	
Sitara-e-Imtiaz (Military) (Star of Excellence)	Sitara-e-Basalat (Star of Good Conduct)	Sitara-e-Harb 1971 War (War Star 1971)	Tamgha-e-Jang 1971 War (War Medal 1971)
Tamgha-e-Baqa (Nuclear Test Medal) 1998	Tamgha-e-Istaqlal Pakistan (Escalation with India Medal) 2002	10 Years Service Medal	20 Years Service Medal
30 Years Service Medal	35 Years Service Medal	Tamgha-e-Sad Saala Jashan-e- Wiladat-e-Quaid-e-Azam (100th Birth Anniversary of Muhammad Ali Jinnah) 1976	Hijri Tamgha (Hijri Medal) 1979
Jamhuriat Tamgha (Democracy Medal) 1988	Qarardad-e-Pakistan Tamgha (Resolution Day Golden Jubilee Medal) 1990	Tamgha-e-Salgirah Pakistan (Independence Day Golden Jubilee Medal) 1997	Turkish Legion of Merit (Turkey)
Order of Aeronautical Merit Grand Officer (Brazil)	Order of King Abdul Aziz (Saudi Arabia)	Military Merit Order First Class (UAE)	Military Order of Oman (Oman)

=== Foreign decorations ===
Foreign Awards
Turkey	Turkish Legion of Merit
Brazil	Order of Aeronautical Merit (Grand Officer)
Saudi Arabia	Order of King Abdul Aziz (Class I)
UAE	Military Merit Order (Class I)
Oman	Military Order of Oman - Class I

Military offices
Preceded by Kaleem Saadat	Chief of Air Staff; 2006–2009	Succeeded by Rao Qamar Suleman
