= Kas =

Kas, Kaš, or KAS may refer to:

== Government ==
- Kerala Administrative Service, administrative civil service of the state of Kerala, India
- Karnataka Administrative Service, civil service of the Indian state of Karnataka

== People ==
- Kaş (surname), a Turkish surname
- Martien Kas (born 1966), Dutch neuroscientist

=== Fictional characters ===
- Kas the Bloody-Handed, in the Greyhawk setting

== Places ==
- Kås, a town in Denmark
- Kaş, a town in Antalya province of Turkey
- Gash, Hormozgan, also known as Kās, a town in Iran
- Qass, Azerbaijan, also known as Kas, a village on Azerbaijan
- Kryoneri Astronomical Station, an observatory in Greece

== Schools ==
- Kaohsiung American School in Taiwan
- Karachi American School in Pakistan

== Organizations ==
- Kas (cycling team), Spain, sponsored by the soft drink
- Konrad Adenauer Stiftung, a German political foundation
- Korean Astronomical Society

== Other uses ==
- Kas (drink), a brand of soft drink produced by PepsiCo
- Beta-ketoacyl-ACP synthase, a group of enzymes
- Kas, a Dutch style of closet for storing clothes

== See also ==
- Kaskas (disambiguation)
- Kass (disambiguation)
- Kaas (disambiguation)
- Kash (disambiguation)
