= Khash =

Khash may refer to:

== Places ==
- Khash County, a county in Iran
  - Khash, Iran, capital of Khash County

=== Afghanistan ===
- Khash River, a river in Afghanistan
- Khash Desert, a desert in Afghanistan
- Khash Rod District, a district in Nimruz Province, Afghanistan
  - Khash, Nimruz, capital of Khash Rod District, Afghanistan
- Khash District, a district in Badakhshan Province, Afghanistan

== Other uses ==
- Khash (dish), Armenian dish, popular in the Caucasus

== See also ==
- Kash (disambiguation)
- Hash (disambiguation)
- Cash (disambiguation)
