= Chash =

Chash may refer to:

In computing

- C Sharp (programming language)
- cHash, a hash value

Places

- Tashkent, the capital of Uzbekistan, which was known as "Chach" in medieval times

== See also ==
- Cash (disambiguation)
