= Gash =

Gash may refer to:

== Places ==
- Gash, Hormozgan, a village in Hormozgan Province, Iran
- Gash, Razavi Khorasan, a village in Razavi Khorasan Province, Iran
- Gash River or Mareb River, flowing out of northern Ethiopia

== People ==
- Jim Gash (born 1967), president of Pepperdine University
- Lauren Beth Gash (born 1960), American politician and lawyer
- Michael Gash (born 1986), English footballer

== Music ==
- Gash (Foetus album), 1995
- Gash (EP), an EP by Pram
- "The Gash", a song by The Flaming Lips from The Soft Bulletin

== Slang ==
- Wound, a type of injury
- Colloquial term for the vulva
- British military slang (specifically from the Royal Navy and Royal Marines) for rubbish (garbage), or for something that is considered useless, broken or otherwise of little value

== Other uses ==
- Gash (TV series), a British television series
- Gash Bell, a fictional character in the manga series Zatch Bell!
