= Kaş (surname) =

Kaş is a Turkish surname. Notable people with the surname include:

- Erkan Kaş (born 1991), Turkish footballer
- İbrahim Kaş (born 1986), Turkish footballer

== See also ==
- Kas (disambiguation)
