= Dasht-e Khash =

Desert in Nimroz Province, Afghanistan

Coordinates: 31°49′59″N 62°30′0″E

The Dasht-e Khash, also Dasht-e Khash or Dasht-e Khāsh is a desert in Afghanistan's Nimruz Province. The desert is adjacent to the Dasht-e Margo. Located at 620 meters above sea level, it is among the five major deserts in Afghanistan, the other four being Dasht-e-Leili, Dasht-e Margo, Dasht-e Naomid, and Registan Desert.
