= Order of King Abdulaziz =

Saudi Arabian order of merit

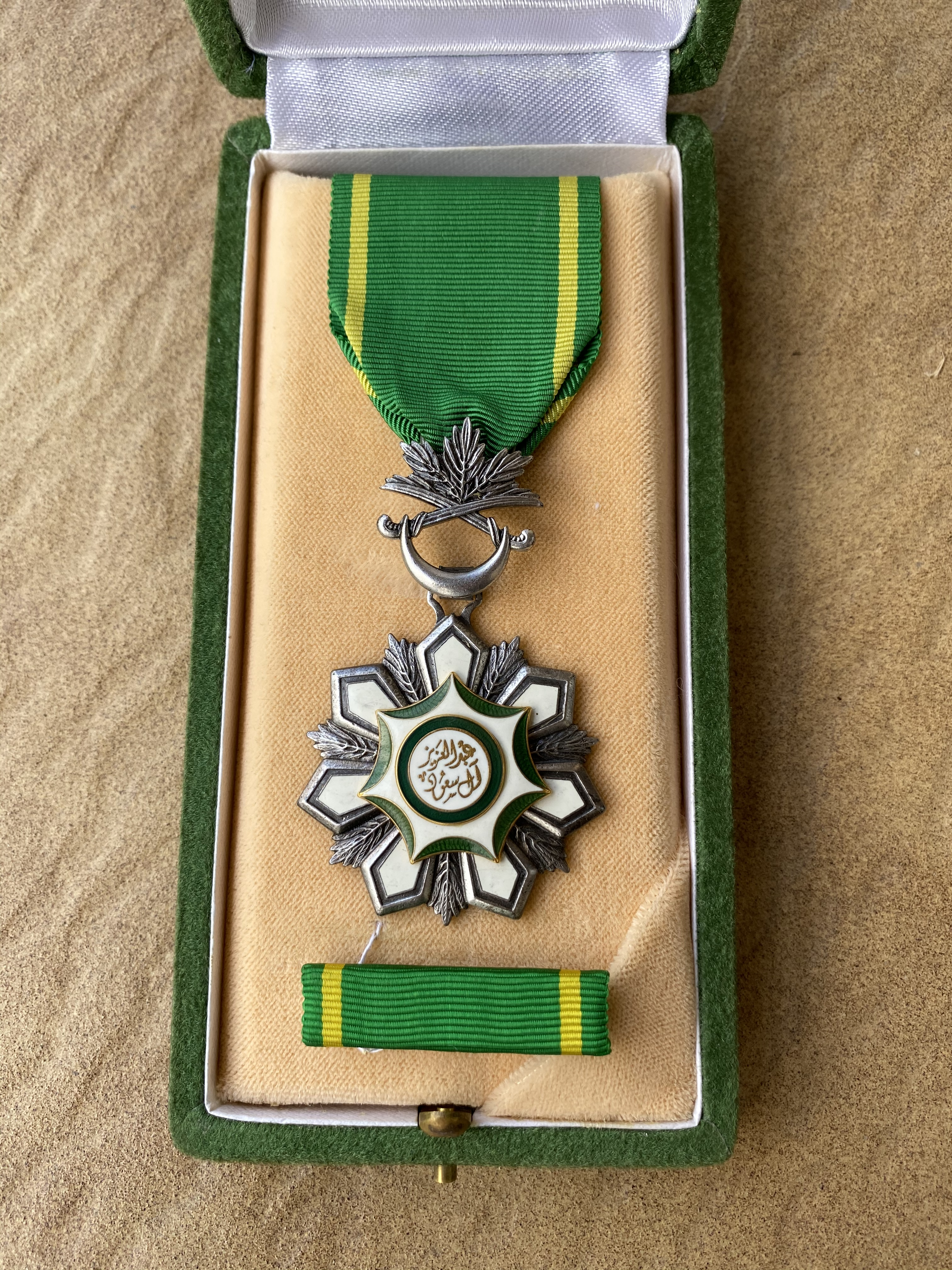
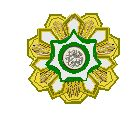
- Insignia of the Order of Abdulaziz Al Saud (5th grade) Star of the Order of Abdulaziz Al Saud

Awarded by The King of Saudi Arabia
- Type: Order of merit with 5 degrees
- Established: 20 March 1971
- Status: currently constituted
- Sovereign: Salman

Precedence
- Next (higher): Great Chain of Badr
- Next (lower): Order of King Faisal
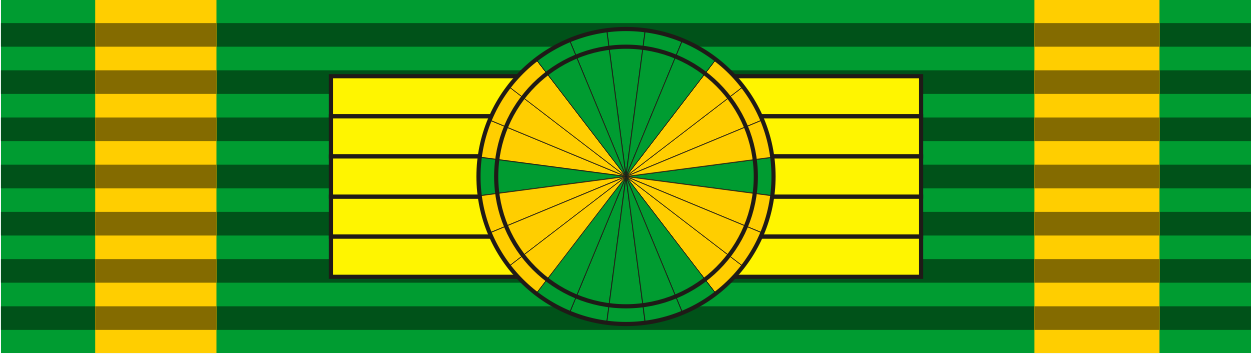
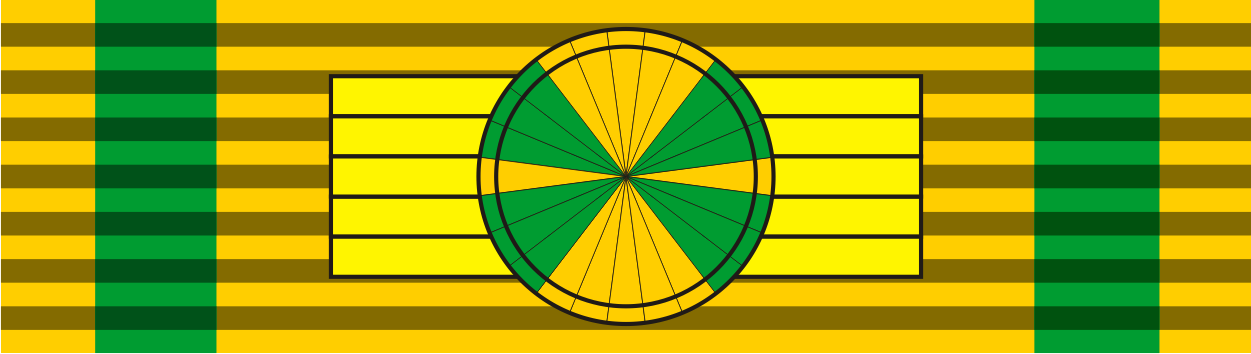
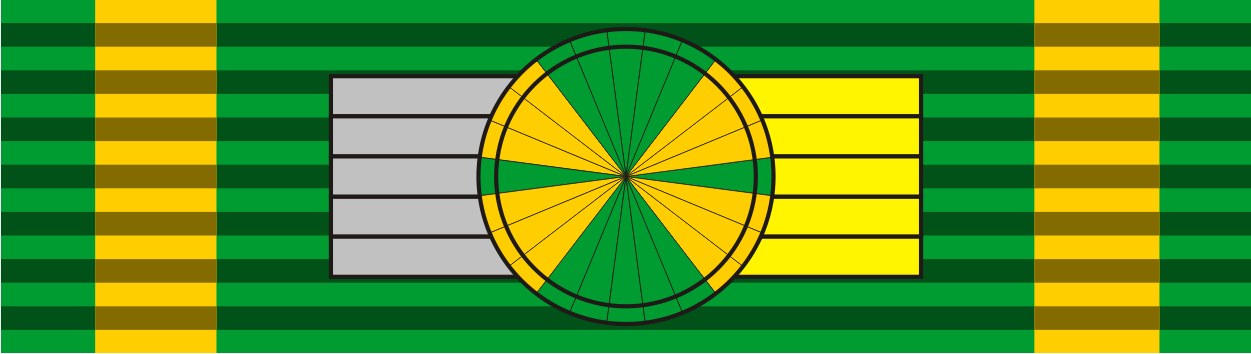
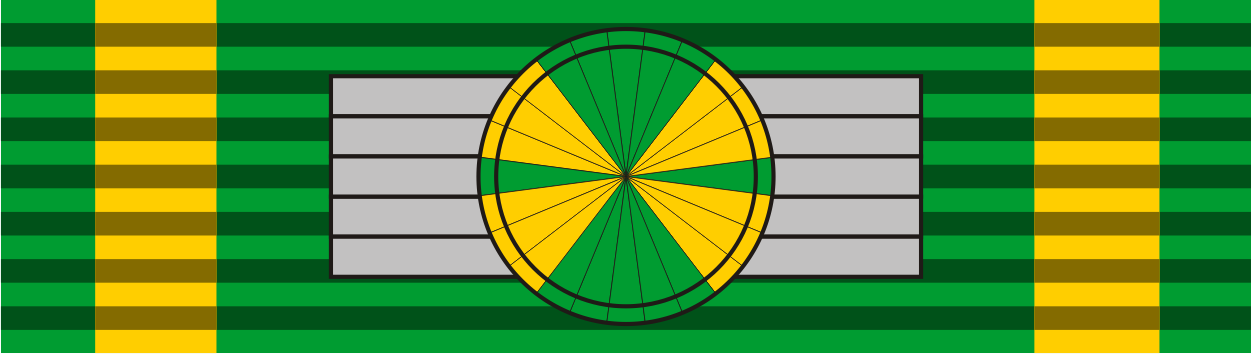
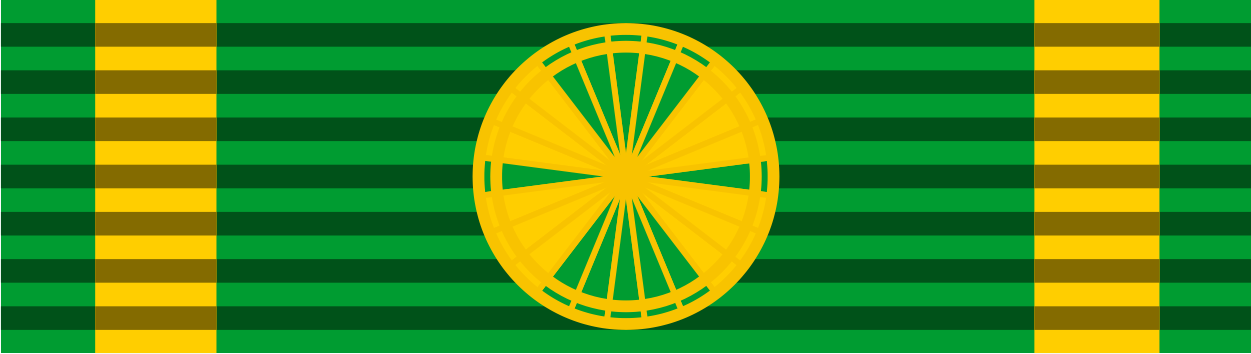
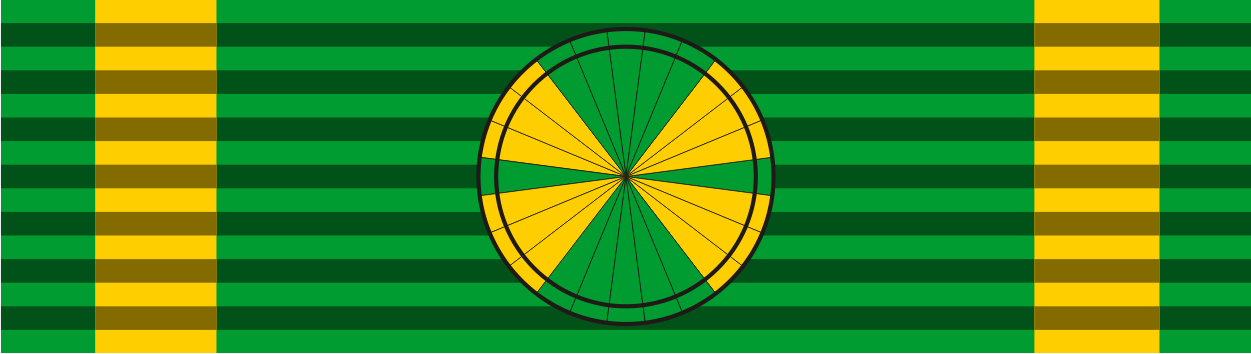
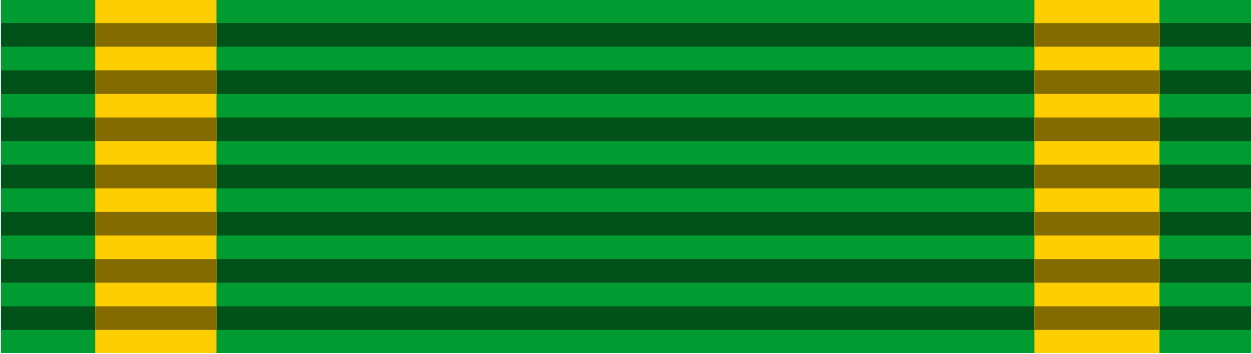
- Order of King Abdulaziz Sash (Special Class); Order of King Abdulaziz Sash (Class II); Order of King Abdulaziz Medal (Distinguished Class I); Order of King Abdulaziz Medal (Class I); Order of King Abdulaziz Medal (Class II); Order of King Abdulaziz Medal (Class III); Order of King Abdulaziz Medal (Class IV); Service Ribbons of the Order of King Abdulaziz

The Order of King Abdulaziz (Arabic: وسام الملك عبد العزيز Wisām al-malik ‘Abd al-‘Azīz) is a Saudi Arabian order of merit. The order was named after Abdulaziz Al Saud, founder of the modern Saudi state.

== History ==
In 1971, the introduction of orders was announced in a decree. It was instituted by King Faisal on 20 March 1971. However, the order had been awarded before that date unsystematically. These earliest versions were produced by Bichay in Cairo, Egypt. The early version of the order was called Great Chain of Badr. The Saudi king, Fons honorum of the orders, confirmed the decree in his Royal decree.

== Collar of the Order of Abdulaziz Al Saud ==
The collar is regarded as a separate order. It also confers the highest rank in the Order of Abdulaziz Al Saud and, unlike the Great Chain of Badr, is awarded to non-Muslim heads of state.

== The Order of Abdulaziz Al Saud ==
The order is awarded to citizens of Saudi Arabia and foreigners for meritorious service to the Kingdom. The Council of Ministers makes the nominations but the King confers awards to foreigners himself when he determines it to be appropriate. Awardees enter in the 4th class of the order, with the exception of ministers and appointees for bravery, who can enter the order in a higher class. Members of the order can advance to the next higher class every five years.

The number of Saudi conferments is limited annually. The statutes of the order stipulate no more than 20 grand sashes of the distinguished class. Up to 40, 60, 80 and 100 awards can be granted to members of the 1st, 2nd, 3rd and 4th classes, respectively.

=== Classes ===
The Classes include:

Order of King Abdulaziz Sash

- Special Class (comparable with "Grand Cordon"). A sash with pendant is worn on the right shoulder, plus a golden star on the left chest;
- Second Class (comparable with "Cordon"). A sash with pendant is worn on the right shoulder, plus a silver star is worn on left chest;

Order of King Abdulaziz Medal

- Distinguished First Class (comparable with "Grand Officer"). The insignia is worn on a necklet, plus a golden star on the left chest;
- First Class (comparable with "Commander 1st Class"). The insignia is worn on a necklet, plus a silver star on the left chest;
- Second Class (comparable with "Commander"). The insignia is worn on a necklet;
- Third Class (comparable with "Officer"). A badge is worn on a ribbon with a rosette on the left chest;
- Fourth Class (comparable with "Knight"). A badge is worn on a ribbon on the left chest.

Order of King Abdulaziz Service Ribbons
Sash		Medal				
Special Class	2nd Class	Distinguished 1st Class	1st Class	2nd Class	3rd Class	4th Class

The Saudis avoid words like "cross" (as in "grand cross") and "knight".

The order is sometimes referred to as the:

- King Abdulaziz Order of Merit
- King Abdulaziz Al Saud Excellence Medal
- King Abdulaziz Medal

== Notable recipients ==
=== Saudi royalty ===
- Bandar bin Sultan Al Saud
- King Faisal
- Fahd bin Abdullah bin Mohammed Al Saud
- Muqrin bin Abdulaziz Al Saud
- Nayef bin Abdulaziz Al Saud – King Abdulaziz Medal (First Class)
- Sara bint Faisal bin Abdulaziz – King Abdulaziz Medal (First Class; 2013)
- Sattam bin Abdulaziz Al Saud – King Abdulaziz Medal (First Class)
- Khalid bin Bandar Al Saud (2011)
- Sultan bin Abdulaziz Al Saud – King Abdulaziz Medal (First Class; 2011)
- Turki bin Nasser Al Saud – King Abdulaziz Medal (First Class)
- Al Waleed bin Talal Al Saud – King Abdulaziz Medal (First Class; 2002)
- Talal bin Abdulaziz Al Saud – King Abdulaziz Sash (Special Class; 1976)

=== Politicians and officials ===
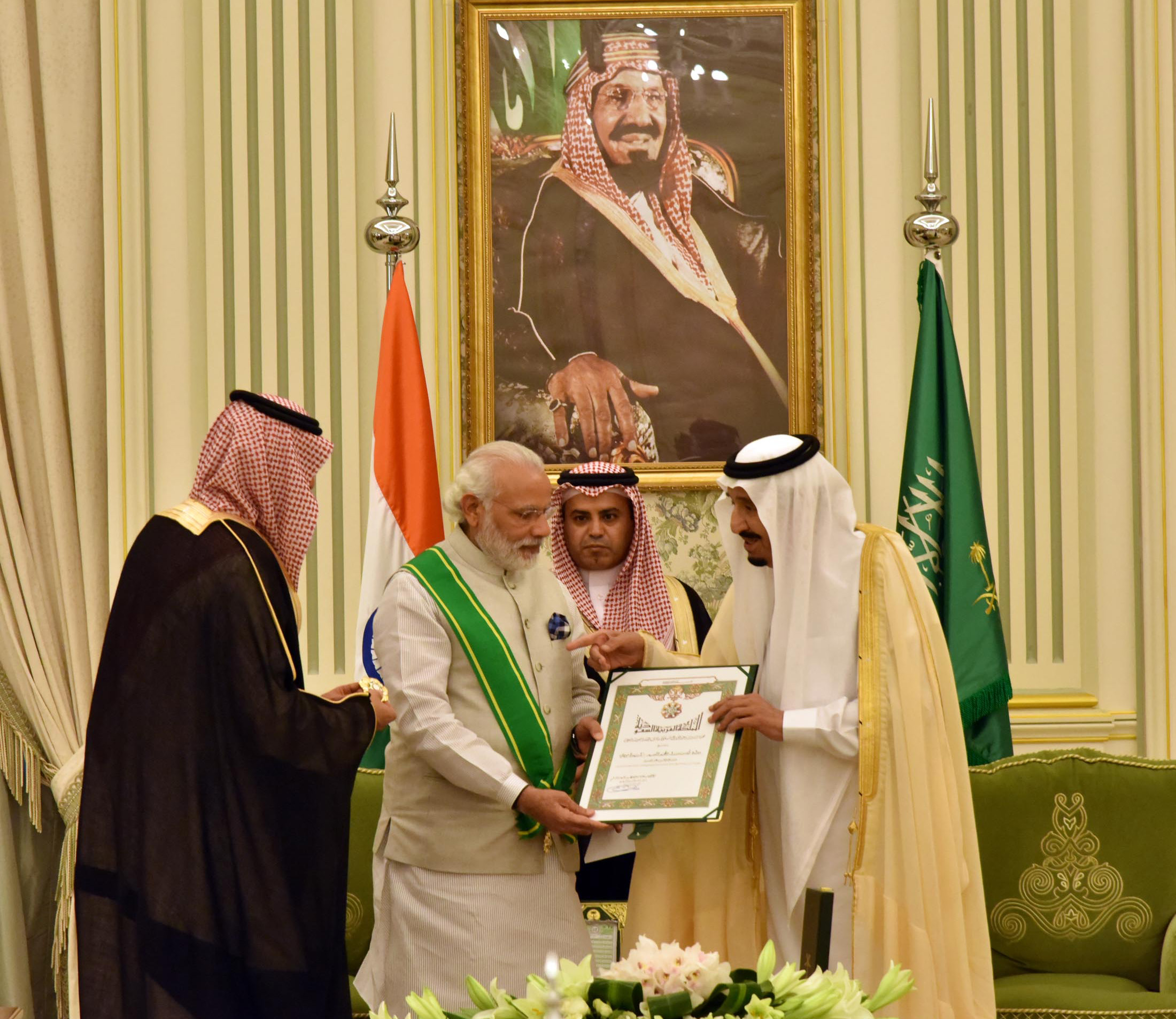
Indian Prime Minister Narendra Modi being conferred the award by King Salman

- Abiy Ahmed – Prime Minister of Ethiopia (16 September 2018)
- Beji Caid Essebsi – President of Tunisia (29 March 2019)
- Isaias Afwerki – President of Eritrea (16 September 2018)
- Petro Poroshenko – President of Ukraine (1 November 2017)
- Donald Trump – President of the United States of America, Collar of Abdulaziz Al Saud (20 May 2017)
- Theresa May – Former Prime Minister of the United Kingdom (Special Class, 6 April 2017)
- Narendra Modi – Prime Minister of India, Order of Abdulaziz Al Saud (Special Class, 3 April 2016)
- Mubarak bin Mohammed Al Nahyan, Emirati official
- Jacob Zuma – President of South Africa (28 March 2016)
- Xi Jinping – President of China and General Secretary of the Chinese Communist Party, Medal of King Abdulaziz (20 January 2016)
- Enrique Peña Nieto – President of Mexico, Order of Abdulaziz Al Saud (Special Class, 17 January 2016)
- Joko Widodo – President of Indonesia, Medal of King Abdulaziz (First Class, September 2015)
- Abdel Fattah el-Sisi – President of Egypt, Medal of King Abdulaziz (First Class; August 2014)
- François Hollande – Former President of France, (Special Class, 30 December 2013)
- David Cameron – Former Prime Minister of the United Kingdom (8 November 2012)
- Manmohan Singh – Prime Minister of India, Order of King Abdulaziz Al Saud (Special Class, 28 February 2010)
- Najib Tun Razak – Former Prime Minister of Malaysia, Medal of King Abdulaziz (First Class, 19 January 2010)
- Giorgio Napolitano – Former President of Italy, Collar of the Order of Abdulaziz Al Saud (5 November 2007)
- Silvio Berlusconi – Former Prime Minister of Italy, Order of Abdulaziz Al Saud (First Class; 22 November 2009)
- Bashar al-Assad – President of Syria, Medal of King Abdulaziz (8 October 2009)
- Barack Obama – Former President of the United States, King Abdul Aziz Order of Merit (June 2009)
- Mohammad Al Jasser – Saudi minister, Medal of King Abdulaziz (First Class; May 2009)
- George W. Bush – Former President of the United States, Medal of King Abdulaziz (First Class; 14 January 2008)
- Mohammed VI – King of Morocco (18 May 2007)
- Carl XVI Gustaf – King of Sweden, Collar of the Order of Abdulaziz al Saud
- Shinzō Abe – Former Prime Minister of Japan, Order of Abdulaziz Al Saud (Special Class; April 2007)
- Vladimir Putin – President of Russia (12 February 2007)
- Sabah Al Khalid Al Sabah – Kuwaiti royal and politician, Medal of King Abdulaziz (First Class)
- Edmond Leburton – Former Prime Minister of Belgium
- Bill Clinton – Former President of the United States
- Gyanendra of Nepal – Former King of Nepal
- Hussein bin Talal – Former King of the Hashemite Kingdom of Jordan, Collar of Abdulaziz Al Saud (1960)
- Hosni Mubarak – Former President of Egypt
- Mohammed bin Ali Aba Al Khail – Former Saudi Finance Minister, 2nd Class Sash
- Ray Mabus – Former ambassador of the United States to Saudi Arabia (April 1996)
- Shakhbout bin Nahyan bin Mubarak Al Nahyan – Former ambassador of the United Arab Emirates to Saudi Arabia, 2nd Class Sash (February 2021)
- Syed Nasir Ali Rizvi – Former Federal Minister of Pakistan for Housing and Urban development (1976)
- Choi Kyu-hah (May 1980)
- Halimah Yacob – President of Singapore (6 November 2019)
- Haitham bin Tariq – Sultan of Oman, (11 July 2021)
- Cyril Ramaphosa – President of South Africa (12 July 2018)
- Al-Muhtadee Billah – Crown Prince of Brunei (3 January 1999)
- Mohammad Reza Pahlavi – Former Shah of Iran (9 August 1955 or 12 March 1957)

=== Military ===
- Syed Asim Munir Ahmed Shah – Chief of Army Staff of Pakistan Army and Chief of Defence Forces of Pakistan Armed Forces (21 December 2025)
- Zaheer Ahmed Babar Sidhu – Chief of Air Staff of Pakistan Air Force (27 February 2024)
- Sahir Shamshad Mirza – Chairman Joint Chiefs of Staff Committee of Pakistan Armed Forces (9 November 2025)
- Mohammed Aly Fahmy – Egyptian Air Force Chief (First class)
- Pervez Musharraf – Pakistan's President & Chief of Army Staff
- Raheel Sharif – Pakistan's Chief of Army Staff
- Amjad Khan Niazi – Chief of the Naval Staff, Pakistan Navy
- Qamar Javed Bajwa – Pakistan's Chief of Army Staff
- Zafar Mehmood Abbasi – Chief of the Naval Staff, Pakistan Navy
- Asif Sandila – Chief of the Naval Staff, Pakistan Navy
- Ashfaq Parvez Kayani – Pakistan's Chief of Army Staff
- Ehsan Ul Haq – Chairman Joint Chiefs of Staff Committee of Pakistan Armed Forces
- Jehangir Karamat – Pakistan's Chief of Army Staff
- Anwar Shamim – Chief of Air Staff of Pakistan Air Force
- Mirza Aslam Beg – Pakistan's Chief of Army Staff
- Noman Bashir – Chief of the Naval Staff, Pakistan Navy
- Iftikhar Ahmed Sirohey – Chief of the Naval Staff, Pakistan Navy
- Lt. Gen Mian Muhammad Afzaal (Shaheed) – Pakistan Army's Chief Of General Staff – (1987)
- Tariq Majid – Pakistan's Chairman of the Joint Chiefs of Staff Committee (2009)
- Lt. General James Ahmann – US Air Force Commander USMTM
- Ali Shamkhani – Former Defence Minister of Iran
- Sir Alan William John West – Chief of British Naval Staff (2004), Medal of King Abdulaziz (First Class)
- Kaleem Saadat – Chief of Air Staff of Pakistan Air Force
- Katsutoshi Kawano – Chief of Staff of the Japan Maritime Self-Defense Force (February 2014)
- Stephane Abrial – Former SACT
- Rao Qamar Suleman – Chief of Air Staff of Pakistan Air Force
- Denis Mercier – Former Chief of Staff of the French Air Force
- Necdet Özel – Chief of Staff of the Turkish Armed Forces (2012)
- Zubair Mahmood Hayat – Pakistan's Chairman Joint Chiefs of Staff Committee
- Muhammad Zakaullah – Chief of the Naval Staff, Pakistan Navy (2 October 2017)
- Tanvir Mahmood Ahmed – Chief of Air Staff, Pakistan Air Force
- Farooq Feroze Khan – Chairman Joint Chiefs of Staff Committee of Pakistan Armed Forces
- Sohail Aman – Chief of Air Staff of Pakistan Air Force (10 February 2018)
- Belal Shafiul Huq – Chief of Army Staff, Bangladesh Army (8 March 2018)
- Aziz Ahmed – Chief of Army Staff, Bangladesh Army (4 February 2018)
- Afzal Tahir – Chief of the Naval Staff, Pakistan Navy
- Shahid Karimullah – Chief of the Naval Staff, Pakistan Navy
- Mansur Ul Haq – Chief of the Naval Staff, Pakistan Navy

=== Others ===
- Krzysztof Płomiński – Polish diplomat
- Samar Al Homoud (King Abdulaziz Medal of First Class)
- ENG. Sultan Al Romayan (King Abdulaziz Medal of Fourth Class)
- Gen. Yousef A. Jamalallail (King Abdulaziz Medal of Second Class)

== See also ==
- Orders, decorations, and medals of Saudi Arabia
