= Feroz Ahmad =

Indian-born academic and historian (1938–2025)

- Born: Ferouz-Uddin Ahmad; 26 January 1938; Delhi, British India
- Died: 20 February 2025 (aged 87); Istanbul, Turkey
- Citizenship: Turkey; United States
- Education: Delhi University; University of London
- Known for: Modern Turkish studies
- Spouse: Bedia Turgay Ahmad
- Children: 2
- Awards: Order of Merit of the Republic of Turkey
- Scientific career
- Fields: History and political science
- Institutions: University of Massachusetts Boston; Yeditepe University
- Thesis: The Committee of Union and Progress in Turkish Politics, 1908–1914 (1966)
- Doctoral advisor: Bernard Lewis

Feroz Ahmad (26 January 1938 – 20 February 2025) was a Turkish-American academic, historian, and political scientist who taught at different universities, including the University of Massachusetts Boston, Tufts University, Harvard University, Columbia University, and Yeditepe University. He was one of the leading scholars studying modern history of Turkey.

== Early life and education ==
Ahmad was born in Delhi, British India, in 1938. He received a bachelor's degree in history from Delhi University and a master's degree in the same field from the University of London. He obtained a PhD from the University of London under the supervision of Bernard Lewis in 1966, and his thesis was about the Young Turk Revolution in 1908. It was first published by Clarendon Press in 1969 with the title The Young Turks: The Committee of Union and Progress in Turkish Politics, 1908-1914.

== Career ==
Ahmad worked at several U.S. universities between 1966 and 2003, including Columbia University and Harvard University. He was Emeritus Professor of history at the University of Massachusetts at Boston. From 2006 he taught at Yeditepe University, Istanbul.

=== Work and views ===
Ahmad published many books and articles, most of which are concerned with Ottoman and modern Turkish history. His major books are as follows: The Young Turks: The Committee of Union and Progress in Turkish Politics, 1908–1914 (1969); An Annotated Chronology of Multi-Party Politics in Turkey (1976, with Bedia Turgay Ahmad); From Unionism to Kemalism, Essays (1985); Turkish Experiment in Democracy (1994); The Making of Modern Turkey (1995); Turkey: The Quest for Identity (2006); From Empire to Republic: Essays on the Late Ottoman Empire and Modern Turkey (2008); and The Young Turks and the Ottoman Nationalities: Armenians, Greeks, Albanians, Jews, and Arabs, 1908–1918 (2014).

In From Empire to Republic: Essays on the Late Ottoman Empire and Modern Turkey Ahmad argued that the reports of the British Foreign Office and of the Istanbul correspondents of The Times newspaper, and the conservative publications in the Ottoman Empire are the roots of the popular anti-semitic conspiracy theories in Turkey.

== Personal life and death ==
Ahmad's wife was a Turkish woman, Bedia Turgay Ahmad (died December 2018), whom he married in 1964. He had twin girls from this marriage. He lived at Darüşşafaka Residence in Istanbul from 2017 until his death. Ahmad died in Istanbul on 20 February 2025, at the age of 87.

== Honors ==
Ahmad was the recipient of the Order of Merit of the Republic of Turkey, which was awarded to him in August 2014.
