= Alka =

Alka, AlkA or ALKA may refer to:

== People ==
- Alka Ajith (born c. 1997), Indian multilingual playback singer
- Alka Amin (active from 2011), Indian television actress
- Alka Balram Kshatriya, Indian politician, Member of the Parliament of India representing Gujarat
- Alka Kaushal (born 1969), Indian film actress in Marathi cinema
- Alka Kriplani (active from before 1995), Indian gynecologist, medical writer and academic
- Alka Kubal (active from born 1965), Indian film actress in Marathi cinema
- Alka Lamba (born 1975), Indian politician
- Alka Matewa (born 1987), Belgian mixed martial artist from Democratic Republic of the Congo
- Alka Nath (born 1950), Indian social worker and politician
- Alka Nupur (active from 1981), Indian film actress in Hindi cinema
- Alka Pande (born 1956), Indian art curator
- Alka Rai, Indian politician
- Alka Sadat (born 1981), Afghan documentary and feature film producer, director and cameraman
- Alka Saraogi (born 1960), Indian novelist and short story writer in Hindi
- Alka Singh, an Indian politician
- Alka Tomar (active from 2003), Indian freestyle wrestler who won a gold medal at the 2010 Commonwealth Games
- Alka Verma (active from 2014), Indian actress
- Alka Vuica (born 1961), Croatian singer-songwriter and politician
- Alka Yagnik (born 1966), Indian playback singer in Hindi cinema

== Other uses ==
- Alka (Baltic religion), a sacred place in Baltic religion
- Alka (insurance), a Danish insurance company
- Alka (Svalbard), a Norwegian island
- ALKA (weapon), a directed-energy weapon
- American Lithuanian Cultural Archives (Lithuanian: Amerikos lietuvių kultūros archyvai), or ALKA, in Putnam, Connecticut, U.S.
- DNA-3-methyladenine glycosylase II, also known as AlkA, an enzyme

== See also ==
- Alka-Seltzer, an effervescent antacid and pain reliever
- Alka-Seltzer Time, a U.S. radio series broadcast 1949–1953
- Hamari Bahu Alka, a 1982 Hindi movie
- Sinjska alka, an equestrian competition held annually in Sinj, Croatia
