= Dasht-e Margo =

Plain in Afghanistan

Coordinates: 31°N 63°E

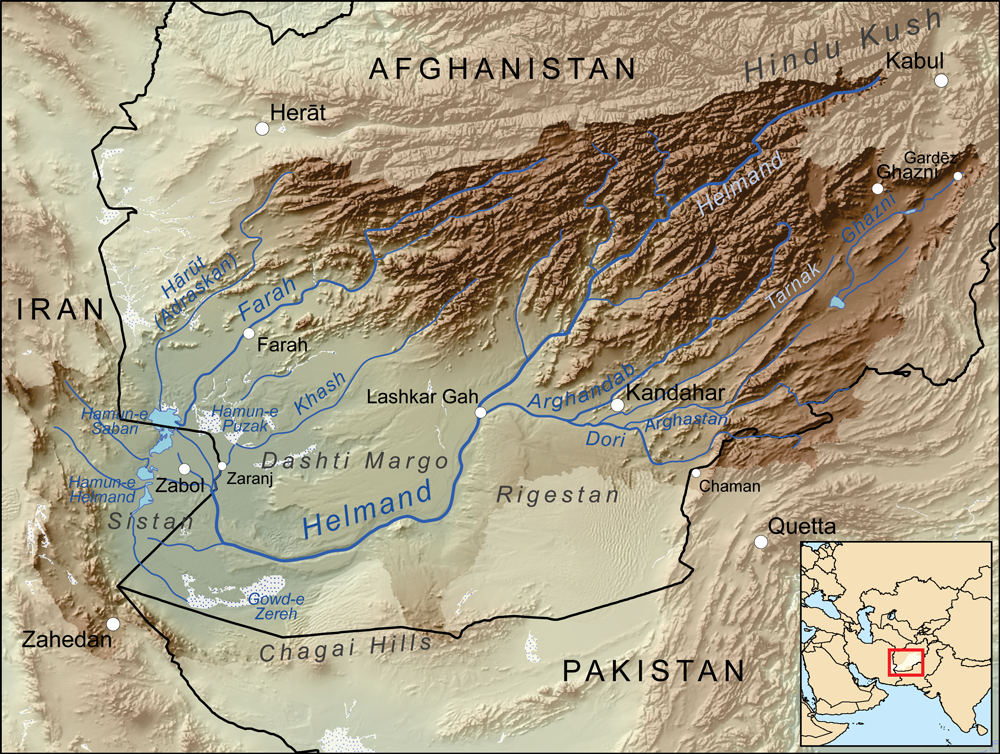
Dasht-e Margo, left of centre

Dasht-e Margo (Persian: دشت مارگو), also Dasht-e Mārgow or Dasht-e Margoh, is a desert region in the southern provinces of Nimruz and Helmand in Afghanistan. The desert is adjacent to the Dasht-e Khash and Registan Desert. It is the world's 20th largest desert at about 150,000 km^{2} in area with an elevation of 500–700 meters above sea level. The desert consists mainly of and rocky-clayish plains with solonchaks, takirs, and rarely oases.

The desert's name means "Desert of Death" in Dari, with dasht meaning "plain" and margo meaning "death".
