= Cass Lake =

Cass Lake may refer to:

Lakes

- Cass Lake (Vancouver Island), Canada
- Cass Lake (Michigan), United States
- Cass Lake (Minnesota), United States

Communities

- Cass Lake, Minnesota, United States
