= Kaas =

Kaas or KAAS may refer to:

- Kaas (noble family)
- KAAS-LP, a low-power television station (channel 31) licensed to Garden City, Kansas, US
- KAAS-TV, a television station (channel 17 virtual/digital) licensed to Salina, Kansas, US
- Kås, or Kaas, a town in Jammerbugt Municipality, Denmark
- Knowledge as a service, a type of computing service
- Cheese (novel) (Dutch: Kaas), a 1933 novel by Willem Elsschot
- Taylor County Airport (Kentucky) (ICAO: KAAS)

== See also ==
- Kas (disambiguation)
- Kash (disambiguation)
