= Orders, decorations, and medals of Saudi Arabia =

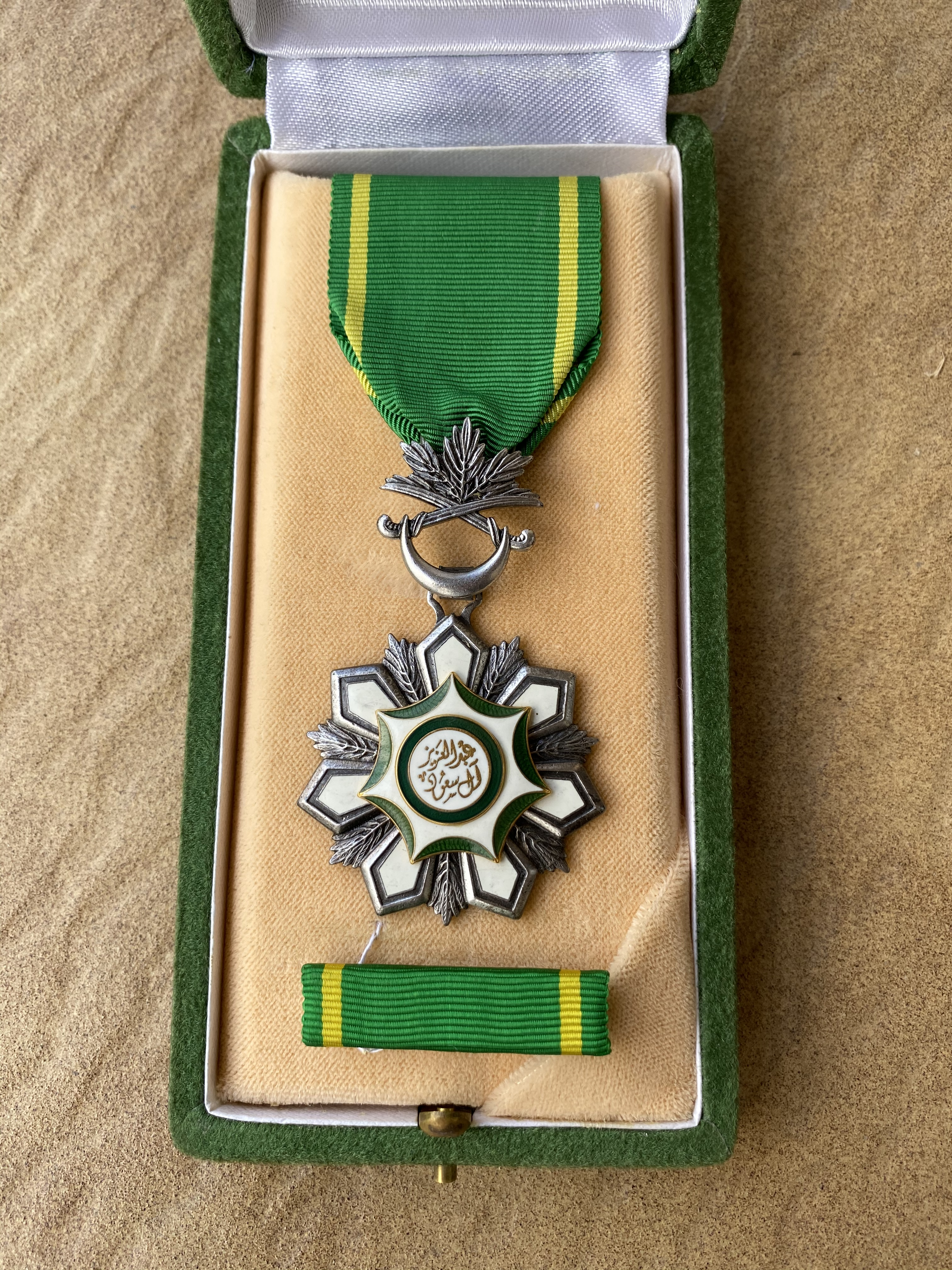
The fifth class or the Order of King Abdul Aziz

Orders, decorations, and medals of Saudi Arabia include:

== Orders of the first degree ==
- A. Great Chain of Badr (قلادة بدر العظمى)
- B. Collar of the Order of King Abdulaziz (قلادة الملك عبد العزيز)

== Orders of the second degree ==
- A. King Abdulaziz Sash (وشاح الملك عبد العزيز), first class
- B. King Abdulaziz Sash (وشاح الملك عبد العزيز), second class

== Orders of the third degree ==
- A. Order of King Abdulaziz (وسام الملك عبد العزيز; five classes)

== Orders of the fourth degree ==
- A. Order of King Saud (وسام الملك سعود; three classes)
- B. Order of King Faisal (وسام الملك فيصل; three classes)
- C. Order of King Khalid (وسام الملك خالد; three classes)
- D. Order of King Fahd (وسام الملك فهد; three classes)
- E. Order of King Abdullah (وسام الملك عبدالله; three classes)
- F. Order of King Salman (وسام الملك سلمان; three classes)

== Other orders, decorations, and medals ==
- Medal of Merit (ميدالية الإستحقاق; three classes)
- Military Appreciation Medal (ميدالية تقدير عسكري; three classes)
- Air Falcon Medal (ميدالية النسر الجوي; three classes)
- Naval Forces Medal (ميدالية القوات البحرية; three classes)
- Hajj Service Medal (ميدالية الحرم; separate levels for officers and non-commissioned officers)
- 1991 Liberation of Kuwait Medal (ميدالية تحرير الكويت 1991 م)
- Leadership Medal (ميدالية القيادة)
- Bravery Medal (ميدالية الشجاعة)
- Combat Medal (ميدالية القتال (المعركة))
- Honour Medal (ميدالية الشرف)
- Military Management Medal (ميدالية الإدارة العسكرية)
- Security Medal (ميدالية الأمن)
- Rescue Medal (ميدالية الإنقاذ)
- Teacher Medal (ميدالية المعلم)
- Perfection Medal (ميدالية الامتياز)
- Invention Medal (ميدالية الاختراع)
- Shooting Medal (ميدالية الرماية)
- Military Service Medal (ميدالية الخدمة العسكرية; with up to five service stars)
- 1979 Holy Mosque Medal (ميدالية الحرم الشريف 1979 م)
- 1984 Exercise Island Crown Medal (ميدالية تدريب تاج الجزيرة 1984 م)
- Centenary Medal (نوط الذكرى المئوية)
- Sports Medal (ميدالية الرياضة; now obsolete)
