= Elka =

ELKA, Elka, or Elkas may refer to:

- Aspioti-ELKA, Greek publishing and printing firm, active 1873–1997
- An Italian synthesizer manufacturer, now defunct; brand now owned by Generalmusic, used for their amplifier products
  - Elka Synthex, a synthesizer produced from 1981–1985
- ELKA, a Bulgarian manufacturer of calculators
  - Elka 22, the most famous model
- Elka (singer) (born 1982), Ukrainian singer
- Elka de Levie (1905–1979), Dutch gymnast
- Elka Gilmore (1960–2019, American chef (of eponymous San Francisco restaurant Elka)
- Elka Graham (born 1981), Australian swimmer
- Elka Nikolova, Bulgarian-American film director
- Elka Ostrovsky, a fictional character from the TV show Hot in Cleveland
- Elka Todorova, Bulgarian sociology, psychology, and social work researcher
- Edward Elkas (fl. 1862–1926), American silent film actor
- Peter Elkas (born 1976), Canadian singer-songwriter
