= Dasht-e Naomid =

Desert in Central Asia

Dasht-e Naomid دشت ناامید (Persian)
- Desert
- Coordinates: 32°45′23″N 60°48′09″E
- Location: Iran-Afghanistan border

Dasht-e Naomid (Persian: دشت ناامید), also Dasht-e Namid, Dasht-e Namadī, or Dasht-e Nāomīd, is a desert in Central Asia, on the Afghanistan-Iran border. It can also be considered part of the Dasht-e Kavir, a large desert in Iran. It occupies a broad intermontane depression east of the East Iranian Mountains. It is partly flooded by the Farah River and its tributaries. The surface is made up of clayey and solonchak plains with desert vegetation. Wormwood and saltwort groupings predominate, with thinned-out black-saksaul thickets in some places. Along the East Iranian Mountains is a strip of steppes. There is transhumant sheep raising and camel raising.
