= Elka Todorova =

Elka Todorova (Bulgarian: Елка Тодорова) is a researcher in the fields of sociology, psychology, and social work, working in the Institute of Sociology at the Bulgarian Academy of Sciences as a senior research associate. She is the author of 6 books and over 35 articles, studies and research reports.

In 2003, she completed the Mid-Career Second Degree Master of Public Administration at Harvard's Kennedy School of Government, which she attended as both a Kokkalis Fellow and an Edward S. Mason Fellow. She is also the recipient of two Fulbright Program fellowships.

Currently, she is director and professor of the Master Program European Social Policy and Social Work at New Bulgarian University in Sofia and senior research fellow at the Institute of Sociology, Department Sociology of Labour and Social Policy at the Bulgarian Academy of Sciences, and a visiting professor at both City University and International University in Bulgaria. She mid

Among her professional memberships, she is member of the Consultative Board for the Union for Private Enterprise and member of the Executive Board for the National Agency for Vocational Training.

== Publications ==
Her publications include the first Bulgarian textbook on Social Psychology - Social Psychology, VSU Publ. House, 1995, 1996, 1997 as well as numerous studies in education and family structure:

- Ethnicity and Politics in Bulgaria and Israel, 1993
- Todorova, E. (2002) "University Education in Bulgaria: Imitation of Overcontrol and Factual Semi Anarchy." In: Knowledge, Power and Freedom in a Changing World. Proceedings from the Fifth Fulbright Conference. pp 93–102. Sofia, Bulgarian-American Commission for Educational Exchange.
- Todorova, E. (2002) "Transforming Post-Communist Countries' Welfare System: The Role Of The State And The Civil Society." In: Sociologitcheski Problemi: The Social World in the 21 C: Ambivalent Legacies and Rising Challenges. pp. 185–196. Special Issue in English.
- Todorova, E. (2003) "The Political Exploitation of Old Age and Intergenerational Conflicts." In: N. Genov (Ed). Prospects of Sociology in Bulgaria. pp. 165–178. REGLO.
- Todorova, E., T. Dechev (2004) The Discussion on Corruption and Its Effect On the Bulgarian Business. Economic Initiative Union Consulting Center, EIU Library.
