= Centre for Aerospace and Security Studies =

Pakistani research institute in the area of aerospace, aviation

Centre for Aerospace & Security Studies
- سینٹر فور ایروسپیس اینڈ سیکوریٹی سٹڈیز
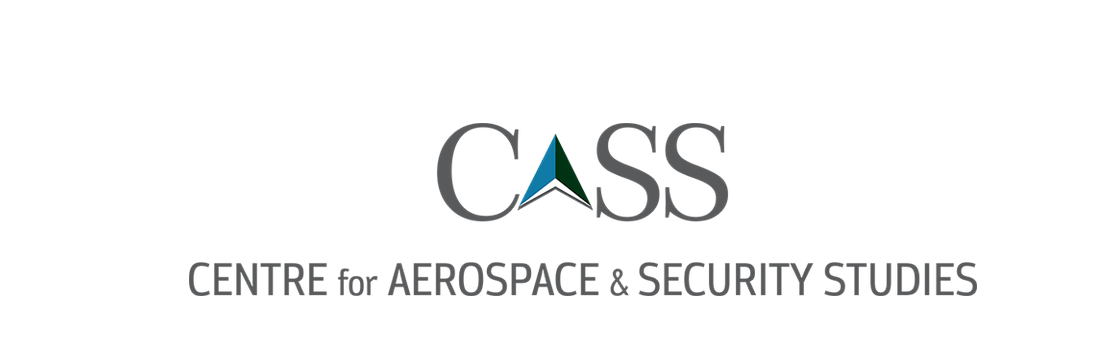
- Abbreviation: CASS
- Formation: December 2018; 7 years ago
- Founder: Pakistan Air Force
- Type: Think tank
- Headquarters: Old Airport Road, Islamabad, Pakistan
- Location(s): Islamabad and Lahore
- President: Air Marshal Javaid Ahmed (Retd)
- Publication: Journal of Aerospace & Security Studies
- Website: www.casstt.com

The Centre for Aerospace & Security Studies (CASS; Urdu: سینٹر فور ایروسپیس اینڈ سیکوریٹی سٹڈیز) is an independent think tank in Islamabad, Pakistan, founded by the Pakistan Air Force (PAF). It conducts research on aerospace, emerging technologies, national security, strategic foresight and related policy areas. CASS was established in December 2018 and formally inaugurated in July 2019 by the then Chief of the Air Staff, Air Chief Marshal Mujahid Anwar Khan. Its founding president was former Air Chief Marshal Kaleem Saadat, and its current president is Air Marshal Javaid Ahmed (Retd), who took office on 29 April 2024. In addition to Islamabad, CASS is also based in Lahore.

CASS's mission is "to provide independent insight and analysis on aerospace and international security issues, of both an immediate and long-term concern; and to inform the discourse of policymakers, academics, and practitioners through a diverse range of detailed research outputs disseminated through both direct and indirect engagement on a regular basis." Its vision is "to serve as a thought leader in the aerospace and security domains globally, providing thinkers and policymakers with independent, comprehensive and multifaceted insight on aerospace and security issues."

== History ==
CASS was established in December 2018 by the Pakistan Air Force to address what its founders saw as a gap in specialised research on aerospace and national security in Pakistan. It was formally inaugurated on 5 July 2019 at a ceremony at which Air Chief Marshal Mujahid Anwar Khan was the chief guest. The News International reported in October 2019 that CASS was the first specialised aerospace research think tank in the country.

In March 2020, CASS held the first edition of its flagship international conference, Global Strategic Threat and Response (GSTAR). In 2022, it launched its peer-reviewed annual journal, the Journal of Aerospace & Security Studies. A Lahore campus, referred to as CASS Lahore, has organised seminars, roundtables and guest lectures since 2021.

== Leadership ==
CASS is headed by a president. All presidents to date have been retired senior officers of the Pakistan Air Force.

No.	President	Term
1	Air Chief Marshal Kaleem Saadat (Retd)	2018 – 2021
2	Air Marshal Farhat Hussain Khan (Retd)	13 September 2021 – 28 April 2024
3	Air Marshal Javaid Ahmed (Retd)	29 April 2024 – present

Air Marshal Farhat Hussain Khan, a former Vice Chief of the Air Staff, also served as Adviser on Aviation to the caretaker Prime Minister of Pakistan, with the status of a federal minister, from August 2023 to March 2024 while president of CASS. Javaid Ahmed, previously Vice Chancellor of Air University and Chairman of the Pakistan Aeronautical Complex, was one of the founding directors of CASS.

== Research ==
CASS organises its research into nine areas: Warfare & Aerospace; Emerging Technologies; National Security; Strategic Foresight; Aviation Industry & Technology Studies; Economic Affairs & National Development; Peace & Conflict Studies; Foreign Policy; and Strategic Defence, Security & Policy. It publishes in English. CASS is part of the Advisory Board of the Government of Pakistan's National Security Division, and advises government stakeholders on issues of national interest.

Following the May 2025 India–Pakistan conflict, CASS researchers published extensively on the air war, and the centre devoted the first issue of its CASS Opinion Roundup series to the May 2025 conflict between India and Pakistan.

=== Publications ===
CASS publishes Issue Papers, Working Papers, Policy Briefs, Reports, Opinion Articles, Book Reviews and Infographics. Its CASS Opinion Roundup compiles thematic collections of opinion articles.

The Journal of Aerospace & Security Studies (JASS) is the centre's flagship publication. It is an annual, double-blind peer-reviewed, open-access journal published in print and online (ISSN 2790-7139; eISSN 2958-082X) under a Creative Commons Attribution 4.0 licence, covering aerospace and emerging technologies, security and defence strategy, and cyber and space security. The first volume was launched in 2022, and the fourth volume appeared in 2025. Its Editor-in-Chief is Dr Aqdas Afzal. JASS has also received Y-category recognition from the Higher Education Commission (HEC).

== Global Strategic Threat and Response (GSTAR) ==
CASS's flagship event is the biennial Global Strategic Threat and Response (GSTAR) international conference.

- GSTAR 2020 was held in Islamabad on 4–5 March 2020. The chief guest was the President of Pakistan, and the Foreign Minister addressed the concluding session.
- GSTAR 2022, themed "Evolving Global Order: Challenges and Opportunities", was held on 19–20 October 2022 at Air Headquarters, Islamabad, and was inaugurated by the President of Pakistan. At the conference, Chief of the Air Staff Air Chief Marshal Zaheer Ahmad Babar Sidhu announced the formal inauguration of the National Aerospace Science & Technology Park (NASTP). Sixteen papers were presented by scholars from seven countries.

== Partnerships and engagement ==
CASS has signed Joint Synergy Charters with some of Pakistan's leading think tanks for joint research, conferences and publications, including one with the Center for International Strategic Studies, Azad Jammu and Kashmir (CISSAJK) in January 2025.

CASS regularly hosts visiting delegations from parliamentary bodies and foreign military staff colleges. The Senate Committee on Defence visited CASS in December 2020. In January 2026, it hosted a delegation from the Army Command and Staff College of Nepal, and in August 2026 a delegation from the Defence Services Command and Staff College of Sri Lanka.

== See also ==
- National Aerospace Science & Technology Park
- International Institute of Air and Space Law
- Korea Aerospace Research Institute
- National Aeronautical Research Institute
- National Institute of Aerospace
