= Kash-e Takht =

Village in Hormozgan, Iran

Kash-e Takht كش تخت
- Village
- Location within Iran
- Coordinates: 26°16′39″N 57°54′24″E
- Country: Iran
- Province: Hormozgan
- County: Bashagard
- Bakhsh: Central
- Rural District: Sardasht

Population (2006)
  - Total: 93
- Time zone: UTC+3:30 (IRST)
  - Summer (DST): UTC+4:30 (IRDT)

Kash-e Takht (Persian: كش تخت; also known as Kash) is a village in Sardasht Rural District, in the Central District of Bashagard County, Hormozgan Province, Iran. As of the 2006 census, its population was 93, in 26 families.
