= Cass High School =

Cass High School can refer to:

- Cass High School (Georgia) in Cartersville, Georgia
- Cass High School (Indiana) (Lewis Cass Jr. / Sr. High School) in Walton, Indiana
- Cass Technical High School in Detroit, Michigan
