= Cass County =

Cass County may refer to:

== Counties in the United States ==
- Bartow County, Georgia, formerly called Cass County
- Cass County, Illinois
- Cass County, Indiana
- Cass County, Iowa
- Cass County, Michigan
- Cass County, Minnesota
- Cass County, Missouri
- Cass County, Nebraska
- Cass County, North Dakota
- Cass County, Texas

== Other uses ==
- Cass County (album), by Don Henley
