= Cass Lake (Vancouver Island) =

CassLake
- Location within Vancouver Island
- Location: Vancouver Island, British Columbia
- Coordinates: 49°02′10″N 124°57′45″W
- Lake type: Natural lake
- Basin countries: Canada

Cass Lake is a lake located on Vancouver Island on the west side Alberni Inlet, south of the Nahmint River.

== See also ==
- List of lakes of British Columbia
