= Alka Singh =

Indian politician

Member of the Rajasthan Legislative Assembly
- Incumbent
- Assumed office 2013
- Constituency: Bandikui

Personal details
- Party: Bharatiya Janata Party
- Occupation: Politician

Alka Singh is an Indian politician from the Bharatiya Janata Party and a member of the Rajasthan Legislative Assembly representing the Bandikui Vidhan Sabha constituency of Rajasthan.
