= Cass River =

Cass River may refer to:

- Cass River (Mackenzie District), New Zealand
- Cass River (Selwyn District), New Zealand
- Cass River (Michigan), United States
- Cass River Railroad, defunct railroad, Michigan, United States
