= CASS microscopy =

CASS is an acronym of Collective Accumulation of Single Scattering. This technique collects faint single scattering signal among the intense multiple scattering background in biological sample, thereby enabling conventional diffraction-limited imaging of a target embedded in a turbid sample.

== Principle ==
CASS microscopy makes use of time-gated detection and spatial input-output wave correlation. Theoretical description is given below.

=== Input-Output Relationship for a given Object Function ===
Let $O(\mathbf{r})$ be a planar object function that we wish to reconstruct. Then, it is related to its Fourier transform $\tilde{O}(\mathbf{k}_s)$ by

$$O(\mathbf{r}) = \int \tilde{O}(\mathbf{k}_s) e^{i\mathbf{k}_s\cdot \mathbf{r}} d\mathbf{k}_s$$

where $\mathbf{k}_s$ represents a 2-dimensional wavevector.

Now, let's take a look at the relation between input and output wave in reflection geometry.

$$E_o(\mathbf{r}) = O(\mathbf{r}) E_i(\mathbf{r}) = O(\mathbf{r}) e^{i \mathbf{k}_i \cdot \mathbf{r}}$$

where we assumed the incoming wave is plane wave.

Then, the angular spectrum of the output field with given input field is

$\tilde{E}_o(\mathbf{k}_o, \mathbf{k}_i) = \int E_o(\mathbf{r}_o;\mathbf{k}_i)e^{i\mathbf{k}_o\cdot \mathbf{r}_o} d\mathbf{r}_o = \tilde{O}(\mathbf{k}_o-\mathbf{k}_i)$

where $E_o(\mathbf{r}_o;\mathbf{k}_i) = O(\mathbf{r}_o)e^{i \mathbf{k}_i \cdot \mathbf{r}_o} = \int \tilde{O}(\mathbf{k}_s)e^{i(\mathbf{k}_i+\mathbf{k}_s)\cdot \mathbf{r}_o} d\mathbf{k}_s$ has been used.

=== Coherent Addition ===
Now, consider a reflection matrix in wavevector space without aberration.

$$\tilde{E}_o(\mathbf{k}_o;\mathbf{k}_i) = \sqrt{\gamma}\tilde{O}(\mathbf{k}_o-\mathbf{k}_i) + \sqrt{\beta}\tilde{E}_M(\mathbf{k}_o;\mathbf{k}_i)$$

where $\gamma(z)=\exp{(-2z/l_s)}$ explains the attenuation of single-scattered wave, and $\beta$ explains the attenuation of the time-gated multiple-scattered waves.

With $\Delta\mathbf{k} \equiv \mathbf{k}_o-\mathbf{k}_i$, total summation of output field over all possible input wavevector becomes:

$$\tilde{E}_{CASS}(\Delta\mathbf{k}) = \sum_{k_i}^N \tilde{E}(\Delta\mathbf{k}+\mathbf{k}_i;\mathbf{k}_i) = N\sqrt{\gamma}\tilde{O}(\Delta\mathbf{k}) + \sum_{k_i}^N \sqrt{\beta}\tilde{E}(\Delta\mathbf{k}+\mathbf{k}_i;\mathbf{k}_i)$$

from which we observe that single-scattered field adds up coherently with the increasing number of incoming wavevectors, whereas the multiple-scattered field adds up incoherently.

Accordingly, the output intensity behaves as follows with the number of incoming wavevector N

$$I_{CASS} \sim \gamma N^2 |\tilde{O}(\Delta\mathbf{k})|^2 + \beta N$$

== Comparison to Confocal Microscopy ==
CASS microscopy has a lot in common with confocal microscopy which enables optical sectioning by eliminating scattered light from other planes by using a confocal pinhole. The main difference between these two-microscopy modality comes from whether the basis of illumination is in position space or in momentum space. So, let us try to understand the principle of confocal microscopy in terms of momentum basis, here.

In confocal microscopy, the effect of the pinhole can be understood by the condition that $A(\mathbf{k}_i)e^{i\mathbf{k}_i\cdot\mathbf{r}_c}=1$ for all possible input wavevector $\mathbf{k}_i$'s, where it is assumed that illumination is focused at $\mathbf{r}=\mathbf{r}_c$.

The resulting field from confocal microscopy (CM) then becomes

$$E_{CM}(\mathbf{r}_o)  = \sum_{\mathbf{k}_i}^N E_o(\mathbf{r}_o ; \mathbf{k}_i) = \sum_{\mathbf{k}_i} A(\mathbf{k}_i)e^{i\mathbf{k}_i\cdot\mathbf{r}_o} O(\mathbf{r}_o) = \sum_{\mathbf{k}_i} e^{i\mathbf{k}_i\cdot(\mathbf{r}_o-\mathbf{r}_c)}O(\mathbf{r}_o)$$

where N refers to the number of possible input wavevector $\mathbf{k}_i$'s.

The formula above gives $E_{CM}(\mathbf{r}_o) = N \cdot O(\mathbf{r}_c)$ for the case of $\mathbf{r}_o=\mathbf{r}_c$.

== Application ==
=== Rat brain imaging through skull ===
CASS microscopy has been used to image rat brain without removing skull. It has been further developed such that light energy can be delivered on the target beneath the skull by using reflection eigenchannel, and about 10-fold increase in light energy delivery has been reported.
