= Orders, decorations, and medals of Turkey =

Orders, decorations, and medals of Turkey are civil and military state decorations regulated and bestowed by the Turkish Republic.

== Civil decorations ==
Civil decorations were established on October 24, 1983, with the Law on Medals and Orders, Act No. 2933. They are rewarded to Turkish citizens, foreigners and organizations for distinguished service, honor and pride in contribution to the emerge of Turkish State through generous action, self-sacrifice, achievement or merit at home or abroad.

=== Medals ===
Award	Name	Decree	Date	Award criteria
	State Medal of Distinguished Service; Devlet Üstün Hizmet Madalyası	No. 2933	24 October 1983	Awarded for the gallantry and sacrifice for the survival of Turkey, the unity of the land and people, peace, unity and solidarity of the society.
	State Medal of Honor; Devlet Şeref Madalyası	No. 2933	24 October 1983	Awarded for the extraordinary service and devotion with high achievement and showing great merit in Turkey or abroad.
	State Medal of Pride; Devlet Övünç Madalyası	No. 2933	24 October 1983	Awarded for the extraordinary success, devotion, effort with respect to peers in any field for the benefit of the state.
	State Medal of War; Devlet Savaş Madalyası	No. 4541	1 March 2000	Awarded to military personnel that demonstrate superior heroism and courage that leads to the change of the course of the war or affect the outcome of the war.

=== Orders ===
Award	Name	Decree	Date	Award criteria
	Order of the State; Devlet Nişanı	No. 2933	24 October 1983	Awarded to the foreigners that foster peaceful relations between Turkey and other states, bring peoples together.
	Order of the Republic; Cumhuriyet Nişanı	No. 2933	24 October 1983	Awarded to the foreigners that foster peaceful relations between Turkey and other states, bring peoples together.
	Order of Merit; Liyakat Nişanı	No. 2933	24 October 1983	Awarded for the promotion and glorification of Turkey in international arena with science and arts.

== Military decorations ==
=== Medals ===
Name	Decree	Date	Award criteria
Turkish Armed Forces Medal of Honor; TSK Şeref Madalyası	No. 4541	27 July 1967	Awarded to those whose achievements in war cannot be awarded with the State Medal of War, although their conduct and conduct prepared or facilitated the victory of the war.; Awarded to those who successfully serve as a Commander for one year in peace time.
Turkish Armed Forces Medal of Pride in Service; TSK Hizmet Övünç Madalyası	No. 4541	27 July 1967	Awarded to injured personnel while performing their duty with great effort and who are a source of pride for the Turkish Armed Forces.
Turkish Armed Forces Medal of Distinguished Courage and Self-Sacrifice; TSK Üstün Cesaret ve Feragat Madalyası	No. 4541	27 July 1967	Awarded to those who fulfill the duties entrusted to them with great courage and renunciation, while putting their lives in danger.
Turkish Armed Forces Medal of Distinguished Service; TSK Üstün Hizmet Madalyası	No. 4541	27 July 1967	Awarded to those that are responsible for the rise and strengthening of the Armed Forces in fields such as defence, administration and science.; Those who discover necessary resources such as tools and equipment for the Armed Forces, or those who have great success in the development of what they have.; Soldiers who excel in the work of the Armed Forces at home and abroad in all fields, who increase the prestige of the union and are beneficial to national interests, and who perform their duties at a superior level by working with renunciation and self-sacrifice compared to their peers.; To lieutenant generals and vice-admirals that are promoted to the rank of general or admiral.; To those who have excelled in the development and strengthening of the Armed Forces.
Turkish Armed Forces Medal of Achievement; TSK Başarı Madalyası	No. 4541	27 July 1967	Awarded to those who have shown exceptional success in the performance of important missions during war time. During peace time, it is given to those whose achievements in the Service exceed what is expected of them.
Turkish Armed Forces Medal of Merit; TSK Liyakat Madalyası	No. 4541	27 July 1967	Awarded to those who show great skill in the achievement of the tasks assigned to them or who are successful in various tasks, who ensure the development of friendly relations between the Turkish Armed Forces and the armed forces of which they are members, and to those who bring nations closer to each other.

=== Orders ===
Name	Decree	Date	Award criteria
Turkish Armed Forces Order of Honor; TSK Şeref Nişanı	No. 4541	27 July 1967	Awarded to those who have done great service for the success and development of the Turkish Armed Forces.
Turkish Armed Forces Order of Pride; TSK Övünç Nişanı	No. 4541	27 July 1967	Awarded to those who died while serving for the Turkish Armed Forces.
Turkish Armed Forces Order of Merit; TSK Liyakat Nişanı	No. 4541	27 July 1967	Awarded to those who show merit in the achievement of important tasks for the Turkish Armed Forces, to those that develop friendly relations between the Turkish Armed Forces and the armed forces of which they are members, and to those who bring nations closer to each other.

== Former decorations ==
- Medal of Independence (İstiklal Madalyası)
