= Qass, Azerbaijan =

Qass
- Location within Azerbaijan Location within Shaki-Zagatala Economic Region
- Coordinates: 41°32′39″N 46°55′08″E
- Country: Azerbaijan
- Rayon: Zaqatala
- Time zone: UTC+4 (AZT)
  - Summer (DST): UTC+5 (AZT)

Qass (also, Kas and Kass) is a village in the Zaqatala Rayon of Azerbaijan.
