= Santos-Dumont Merit Medal =

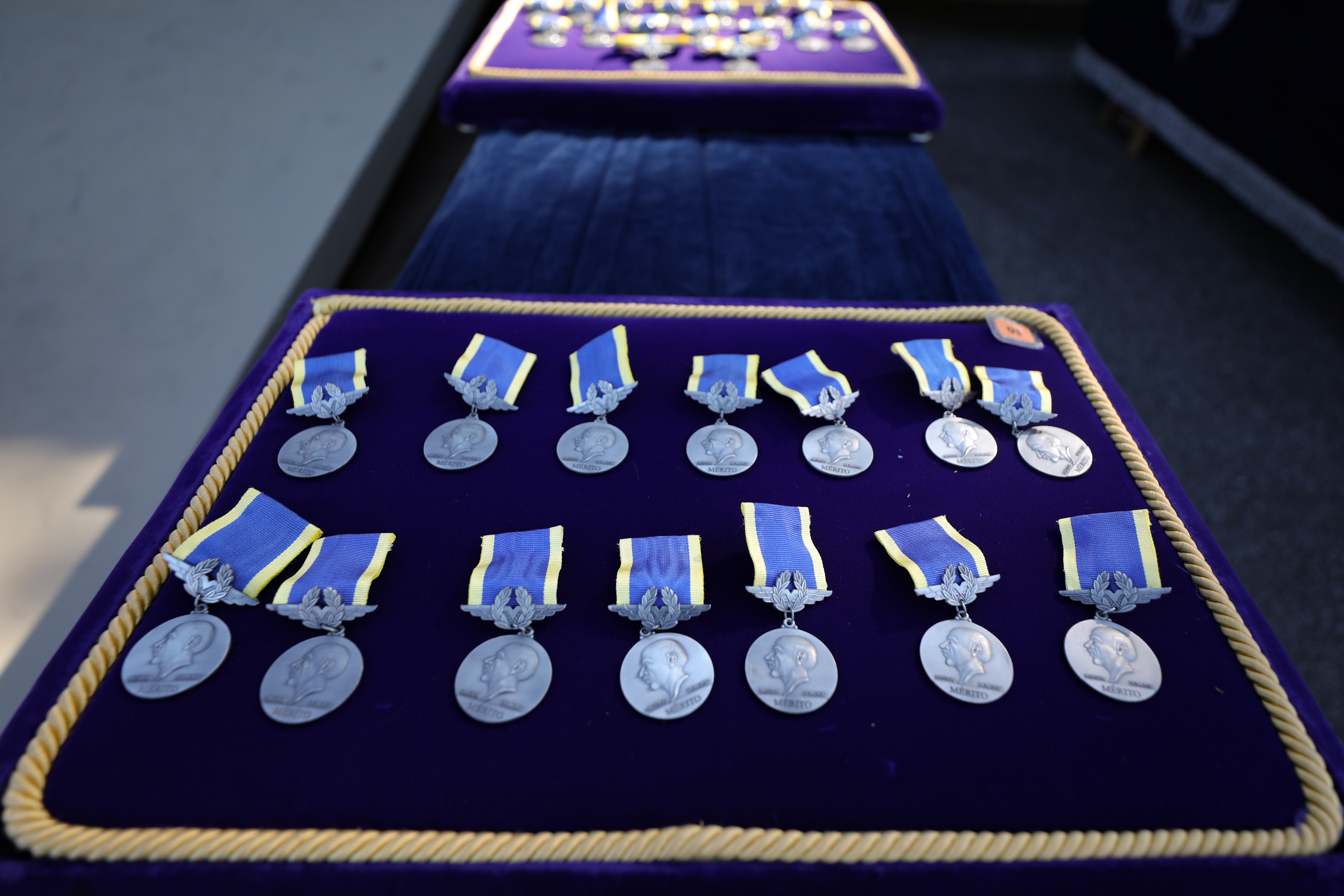
- Country: Brazil
- Presented by: Brazilian Air Force
- Established: 5 July 1956 (70 years ago)
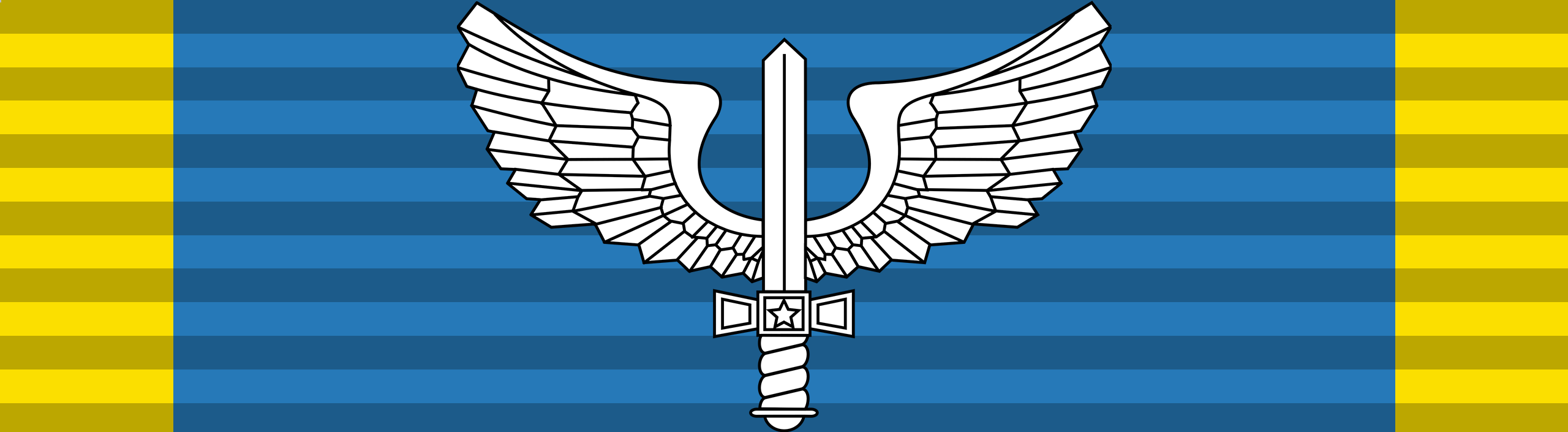
- Ribbon bar of the order

The Santos-Dumont Merit Medal is a Brazilian decoration created to honor civilians and military, Brazilian or foreign, for outstanding services rendered to the Brazilian Air Force or in recognition of its qualities and value in relation to aeronautics.

== History ==
It was created by Decree No. 39,905, of September 5, 1956, on the occasion of the 50th anniversary of the first flight of the Santos-Dumont 14-bis plane.

The medal is granted by act of the Commander of the Air Force. The merit of the candidates eligible to be awarded the medal is examined by the Santos-Dumont Merit Council. The council consists of the Commander of the Aeronautics, acting as its President; the Chief of the Aeronautics Staff; the General Staff Commander; and, as secretary, the Chief of Staff of the Commander of the Air Force.
