= Gash, Hormozgan =

Gash گاش
- Village
- Location within Iran
- Coordinates: 27°33′15″N 56°25′54″E
- Country: Iran
- Province: Hormozgan
- County: Bandar Abbas
- Bakhsh: Central
- Rural District: Isin

Population (2006)
  - Total: 27
- Time zone: UTC+3:30 (IRST)
  - Summer (DST): UTC+4:30 (IRDT)

Gash (Persian: گاش, also Romanized as Gāsh; also known as Gāsh-e Mayāmey, Gash Meyamey, Gāsh Mīāmey, and Kās) is a village in Isin Rural District, in the Central District of Bandar Abbas County, Hormozgan Province, Iran. At the 2006 census, its population was 27, in 13 families.
