= Cash (disambiguation) =

Cash is legally recognized money in such forms as banknotes and coins.

Cash also may refer to:

== Currency ==
- Cash (currency), various Asian units
  - Cash (Chinese coin), also called "方孔錢" (fāng kǒng qián)
  - Chinese cash (currency), also called "文" (wén)
  - Vietnamese cash (văn), a historical Vietnamese currency unit and a specific copper coin

== Places in the United States ==
- Cash, Arkansas, a city
- Cash, Georgia, an unincorporated community
- Cash, Kentucky, an unincorporated area
- Cash, Michigan
- Cash, South Carolina, an unincorporated community and census-designated place
- Cash, Texas, an unincorporated community

== People ==
- Cash (surname), a list of people
- Cash Asmussen (born 1962), American thoroughbred horse racing jockey
- Wack 100 (born Cash Jones; 1978), American rapper, music manager, hip hop commentator, and record executive
- Cash McCall (musician) (1941–2019), American electric blues guitarist, singer and songwriter
- Cashman Cash Peters (born 1956), British writer
- Amir "Cash" Esmailian, Iranian-Canadian music industry executive
- Chri$ Ca$h (1982–2005), stage name of American wrestler Christopher Bauman

== Arts and entertainment ==
=== Films ===
- Cash (1933 film), a British film by Zoltan Korda
- Cash (2007 film), Bollywood film set in Cape Town, South Africa
- Cash (2008 film) (stylized as Ca$h), French film directed by Eric Besnard
- Cash (2010 film) (stylized as Ca$h), American thriller directed by Stephen Milburn Anderson
- Cash (2021 film) Indian comedy drama
- the protagonist of Cash McCall, a 1960 American film
- Gabriel Cash, a protagonist of Tango & Cash, a 1989 American film

=== Music ===
- C.A.S.H. (album), a 2010 album by Cassidy
- "Cash", a song by Patti Smith from her 2004 album Trampin'
- "Cash", a song by Brockhampton from Saturation
- "Cash", a song by Lil Baby from Harder Than Ever

=== Other arts and entertainment ===
- Cash: The Autobiography, an autobiography of Johnny Cash
- "Cash" (The Young Ones), an episode of the British sitcom
- Cash (suit), a card suit for money-suited cards

== CASH ==
- Centers for Agricultural Safety and Health, eleven federally funded U.S. agencies focused on agricultural safety
- Coatesville Area Senior High School
- Combat Support Hospital, a type of US-military field-hospital
- Composers and Authors Society of Hong Kong
- Cortical androgen-stimulating hormone

== Other uses ==
- Cash Buckzo, a fictional character in the animated series Helluva Boss, voiced by Jonathan Freeman
- Cash (mass) (厘 lí), a traditional Chinese unit of mass or weight
- Cash's, an English manufacturer of ribbons and other woven products
- MetaBank (Nasdaq: CASH), an American bank headquartered in South Dakota

== See also ==
- Cash Cash, an American band
- Cache (disambiguation)
