= Order of Merit of the Republic of Turkey =

Order of Merit of the Republic of Turkey Türkiye Cumhuriyeti Liyakat Nişanı

Awarded by President of Turkey
- Type: State Orders
- Eligibility: Foreign scientists, academics, artists and intellectuals
- Awarded for: "Given to people who foreign nationals in recognition of their contributions for international promotion and glorification of the Republic of Turkey in science and arts."
- Status: Currently constituted

Statistics
- First induction: 8 June 1990 (Germany) Josef Jakob Heinrich Otten
- Last induction: 11 June 2014 (United States) Feroz Ahmad
- Total inductees: 55

Precedence
- Next (higher): Order of the Republic
- Next (lower): None

The Order of Merit of the Republic of Turkey (Turkish: Türkiye Cumhuriyeti Liyakat Nişanı) is awarded by the President of Turkey upon the proposal of the relevant members of the Cabinet considering the opinions of the Ministry of Foreign Affairs and the Atatürk Supreme Council for Culture, Language and History.

The order is awarded to foreign scientists, academics, artists and intellectuals in recognition of their contributions to international promotion and celebration of the Republic of Turkey in science and arts.

== Recipients of the Order of Merit ==
- 8 June 1990 – Germany : Joseph Jacob Heinotten
- 8 June 1990 – Austria : Clemens Holzmeister
- 25 October 1996 – Germany : Rupert Wilbrandt
- 25 October 1996 – Austria : Wilhelm Leitner
- 25 October 1996 – Germany : Annemarie Schimmel
- 28 August 1997 – Hungary : Geza Feher
- 28 August 1997 – Hungary : Gerö Gyözü
- 28 August 1997 – Hungary : Geza David
- 20 November 1997 – Ireland : Ninette de Valois
- 14 January 1998 – France : Jean-Paul Roux
- 14 January 1998 – France : Robert Mantran
- 14 January 1998 – Japan : Yuzo Nagata
- 14 January 1998 – Japan : Shoichiro Toyoda
- 14 January 1998 – Japan : Isao Yonekura
- 14 January 1998 – Azerbaijan : Kamil Veli Nerimanoğlu
- 14 January 1998 – Azerbaijan : Tofig Ismayilov
- 14 January 1998 – United States : Justin McCarthy
- 14 January 1998 – United States : Stanford Shaw
- 14 January 1998 – United Kingdom : Bernard Lewis
- 14 January 1998 – United Kingdom : Andrew Mango
- 14 January 1998 – United Kingdom : Geoffrey Lewis
- 14 January 1998 – Ukraine : Omeljan Pritsak
- 14 January 1998 – Uzbekistan : Roziya Galiyevna Mukminova
- 14 January 1998 – Kyrgyzstan : Bubina Oruzbayeva
- 14 January 1998 – Russia : Edhem Tenişev
- 14 January 1998 – Ukraine : Gubeydolla Aydarov
- 13 February 1998 – Austria : Bert G. Fragner
- 13 February 1998 – Turkmenistan : Oraz Yağmur
- 14 February 1998 – France : André Clot
- 5 October 1998 – Italy : Augusto Sinegra
- 9 October 1998 – United Kingdom : Patrick Kinross
- 9 October 1998 – Egypt : Nasrullah Mübeşşir el-Tırazi
- 9 October 1998 – Egypt : Hüseyin Mucib el-Mısri
- 1 January 1999 – Kazakhstan : Abdimalik Nisanbayev
- 4 January 1999 – Egypt : İbrahim El-Mouelhy
- 3 June 2008 – Japan : Sachihiro Omura
- 20 October 2008 – Sweden : Lars Johanson
- 20 October 2008 – Hungary : András Róna-Tas
- 20 October 2008 – United States : Robert Dankoff
- 20 October 2008 – United States : Walter G. Andrews
- 20 October 2008 – Russia : Viktor Guzev
- 11 June 2014 – Greece : Evangelia Balta
- 11 June 2014 – Germany : Suraiya Faroqhi
- 11 June 2014 – United States : Cornell Fleischer
- 11 June 2014 – Canada : Feridun Hamdullahpur
- 11 June 2014 – Hungary : György Hazai
- 11 June 2014 – Netherlands : Machiel Kiel
- 11 June 2014 – Bosnia and Herzegovina : Fehim Nametak
- 11 June 2014 – Russia : Dimitri Mihailoviç Nasilov
- 11 June 2014 – United States : Julian Raby
- 11 June 2014 – Austria : Claudia Römer
- 11 June 2014 – Japan : Tadashi Suzuki
- 11 June 2014 – Tunisia : Abdeljelil Temimi
- 11 June 2014 – China : Abudurexıti Yakufu
- 11 June 2014 – United States : Feroz Ahmad
