= Polish people in Pakistan =

- (Poland) (Pakistan)

Total population
- Unknown

Regions with significant populations
- Karachi, Islamabad

Languages
- Urdu, English, Polish

Religion
- Roman Catholicism, Islam

Related ethnic groups
- Polish people

The Polish community in Pakistan consists of Pakistani citizens of Polish ancestry, as well as Polish nationals who migrated to and settled in the country.

== History ==
During the Second World War, between August 1942 and December 1944, approximately 28,000 Polish refugees arrived in Karachi, then part of the British Raj. Many of them were later resettled in other countries, but a number died during their stay. About 58 Polish graves remain in the Christian Gora Qabaristan cemetery in Karachi. In 2012, the Polish government erected a memorial at the cemetery, inscribed with the names of the 58 individuals who died in Karachi during the 1940s.

Most of the current migrants came to the country after its independence in 1947. The Pakistan Air Force employed some 30 Polish pilots to help develop it in the initial years with three year contracts.

== Notable people ==
- Władysław Turowicz — A Polish pilot who settled in Pakistan after the Second World War. He joined the Pakistan Air Force, rising to the rank of Air Commodore, and later became a leading figure at the Space and Upper Atmosphere Research Commission (SUPARCO).
- Muhammad Asad — A Polish-Jewish writer and polymath who converted to Islam in 1926, he would later support the Pakistan Movement after meeting Muhammad Iqbal in 1932. He served in several roles in the Pakistani government and as a diplomat before resigning in 1952 due to Foreign Office regulations on marrying non-Pakistani individuals. His third wife was also a Polish convert to Islam, though she only lived with him in Pakistan briefly.
- Anna Molka Ahmed — Born to a Polish-Jewish family in London, she migrated to Lahore after marriage. She became a pioneering artist and founded the Department of Fine Arts at the University of the Punjab.
- Ilona Yusuf — A contemporary Pakistani poet of Polish descent, known for her English-language poetry collections and for contributing to Pakistani literary journals.

== See also ==
- Polish civilian camps in World War II
- Murder of Piotr Stańczak
- Pakistan–Poland relations
- Polish diaspora
- Immigration to Pakistan
