= Air University Pakistan =

Public university in Islamabad, Pakistan

Coordinates: 33.7138°N 73.0247°E

Air University
- جامعہ فضائیہ
- Air University
- Other name: AU
- Motto: Taking Academic Excellence To New Heights
- Type: Public
- Established: 2002
- Affiliations: Higher Education Commission, Pakistan Engineering Council, Pakistan Medical Commission, Association of Commonwealth Universities, International Association of Universities
- Vice-Chancellor: Air Marshal Abdul Moeed Khan, HI(M)
- Principal: 2
- Dean: 7
- Director: 15
- Academic staff: 260
- Administrative staff: 700
- Students: 6043
- Undergraduates: 5043
- Postgraduates: 1000
- Location: Islamabad, ICT, Pakistan
- Campus: Air university Multan Campus, Air university kharian Campus, Air university Kamra Campus, Air University Karachi Campus
- Website: https://au.edu.pk/

The Air University (AU) (Urdu: جامعہ فضایہ Jāmiʿah Fazaiyah) is a federally chartered public-sector research university in Pakistan. Established in 2002, its main campus is located in the capital city of Islamabad, Pakistan. The university has Four other functional campuses: the Aerospace and Aviation Campus at Kamra and a campus in Multan Campus in karian and another campus in Karachi.

The university offers undergraduate and post-graduate degrees in artificial intelligence, business management, computer science, cyber security, engineering, medicine, and humanities. It is ranked among the country's top ten universities in the Engineering and Technology category by the Higher Education Commission (HEC).

Air University is recognized by the HEC and accredited by the Pakistan Engineering Council and Pakistan Medical Commission. It is a member of Association of Commonwealth Universities of the United Kingdom and International Association of Universities.

== History ==
The university was established in 2001 with the aim to promote science and technology in Pakistan with Air Marshal Qazi Javed Ahmed appointed as its founding chancellor.

In August 2001, a feasibility report regarding the university was submitted to then University Grants Commission (UGC, now HEC) for approval. Later, in November 2001, UGC done a detailed inspection of the proposed premises.

In April 2002, the feasibility report was revised based on the feedback provided by the UGC. Meanwhile, construction of the admin block was started.

In September 2002, the first batch was admitted and classes began.

In October 2002, the university received a charter from the president of Pakistan.

In June 2003, the prime minister of Pakistan inaugurated the university formally and made a contribution of Rs 20 million for the expansion of the university.

In February 2006, the construction work on the Institute of Avionics and Aeronautics was started.

In November 2008, Air Commodore Ijaz A Malik was appointed as the second vice-chancellor of the university.

In March 2011, a new sub-campus of the university in Multan was established.

In October 2014, Air Vice Marshal Faaiz Amir was appointed as the new vice-chancellor of Air University.

In January 2020, Air Marshal Javaid Ahmed succeeded Air Vice Marshal Faaiz Amir as the new vice-chancellor.

In February 2020, Air University Aviation & Aerospace Campus Kamra, located on a land of 50 acres in PAC Kamra became functional.

In April 2024, Air Marshal Abdul Moeed Khan HI(M) has been appointed as new Vice-Chancellor.

== Campuses, constituent colleges, and affiliated institutes ==
There is one main campus in Islamabad, two other functional campuses are located in Kamra Multan and Kharian, and Another new campus is under construction in Islamabad.

=== Campuses ===
==== Main Campus ====
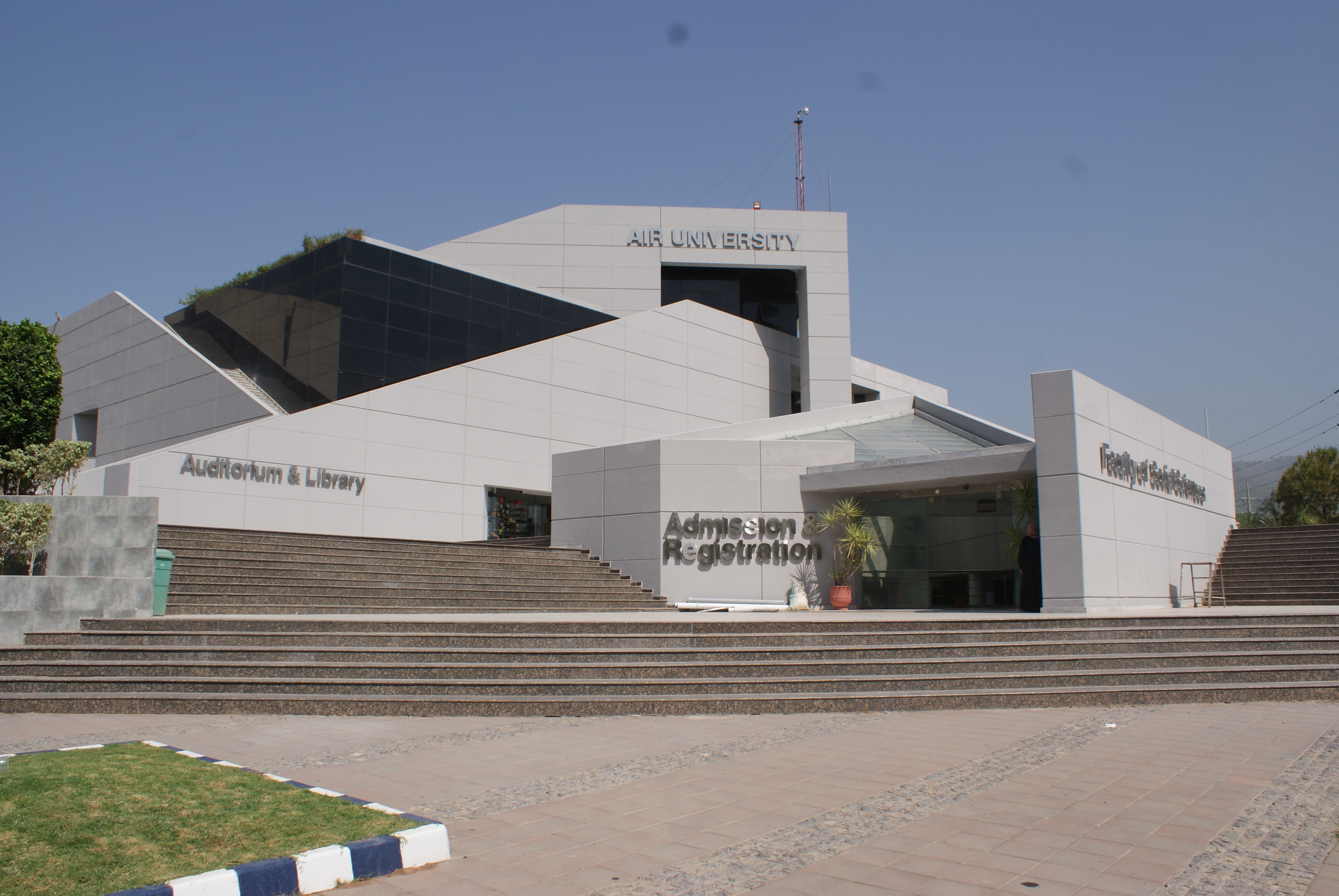
Air University Main Campus, Islamabad

The main campus is situated close to the Margalla foothills in the southeast of sector E-9 (PAF Complex) of Islamabad. The primary entrance is adjacent to the intersection of Agha Shahi Avenue (9th Avenue) and Khayaban-e-Iqbal (Margalla Road), opposite to E/9 Campus of Bahria University, Islamabad. Different departments have different buildings. Faculty of Electrical Engineering Department is the oldest one. The newest edition to the buildings is the faculty of Computer Science, C block functional since 2022.

==== Air University Aerospace and Aviation Campus Kamra ====
Air University Aviation & Aerospace Campus Kamra is a 20.2 ha (50-acre) campus located in PAC Kamra and aims to further research in aviation. The campus is being built in five phases with phase one being complete and functional since February 2020.

The facilities of the campus include a separate hostel for boys and girls hostels, a dining area, medical facilities, and sports arenas.

==== Air University Multan campus ====
Air University Multan Campus was inaugurated in 2011 by then prime minister of Pakistan, Yousaf Raza Gillani.

In the first phase, the campus started its operations in a commercial plaza named "Khan Centre" at Abdali Road, Multan Cantt, with a total covered area of about thirty-three thousand square feet, and about 700 enrolled students.

Now, the Air University Multan Campus (AUMC) has shifted to a proper built campus on 10.3 ha (25 acres) of land located at Bahawalpur Road, Multan. Phase-1 of the project is completed, in which one academic block and one hostel block have been completed, whereas three more academic blocks, two more residential hostels, an auditorium and a student center are planned in the near future. khariyan campus

==== South Campus ====
Another campus is in the construction phase in Sector H-11/2 of Islamabad. The campus will comprise seven academic blocks, two residential blocks, a new automated central library, an administration block, an auditorium, and a cafeteria.

In January 2020, then prime minister of Pakistan, Imran Khan, laid the foundation of the new campus. First academic block and hostel was completed by December 2022. In addition to its own campuses, the university has two constituent colleges and five affiliated institutes. The H-11 campus is functional as of October 2025.

==== Kharian campus ====
Air University Kharian Campus is located near Kharian in Punjab, Pakistan. It was established in 2024 and began offering undergraduate programs from the Spring 2024 semester.

=== Constituent units ===
- Fazaia Medical College
- Fazaia Ruth Pfau Medical College
- PAF College of Aviation & Safety Management (CASM), Karachi
- College of Flying Training (CFT), PAF Academy Asghar Khan, Risalpur
- NASTP Institute of Information Technology(NIIT), Lahore

=== Affiliated institutes ===
- Bilquis College of Education for Women, Chaklala, Rawalpindi
- Fazaia College of Education for Women, Lahore
- Aero Medical Institute, PAF Base Masroor, Karachi
- College of Education, Peshawar
- College of Education for Women, Peshawar

== Organization and administration ==
=== Vice-Chancellors ===
- Air Marshal Qazi Javed Ahmed (retd) (2001 – November 2008)
- Air Cdre Ijaz Ahmad Malik (retd) (November 2008 – October 2014)
- Air Vice Marshal Faaiz Amir (retd) (October 2014 – January 2020)
- Air Marshal Javaid Ahmed (retd) (January 2020 – May 2024)
- Air Marshal Abdul Moeed Khan, HI(M) (May 2024 – present)

== Academic profile ==
=== Faculties ===
==== Faculty of Basic and Applied Sciences ====
The faculty of Basic and Applied Sciences comprises two departments: the department of mathematics, and the department of Physics.

Recently, the Department of Mathematics has started a master's degree in mathematical modeling and scientific computing.

==== Faculty of Engineering ====
The department of electrical engineering offers degrees in three areas: electronics, telecommunications, and power.

Moreover, the faculty of engineering also offers BS and MS programs in mechatronics and biomedical engineering.

It has also collaborated with national centers such as the National Institute of Vacuum Science and Technology (NINVAST) and the National Center of Physics (NCP) to further strengthen the students and faculty.

==== Faculty of Computing and AI ====
The Faculty of Computing and AI (FCAI) offers bachelor's, master's, and Ph.D. programs in computing and artificial intelligence fields.

In 2019, the department was upgraded as the Faculty of Computing & Artificial Intelligence with three separate departments, including the department of Computer Science, Creative Technologies, Computer Games Design and cyber security.

FCAI faculty members have been included among the world's top two percent researchers.

FCAI also offers certification programs of Huawei, Oracle, Microsoft, and CISCO through its newly established academy named Air University Computing Academy.

==== Faculty of Humanities and Social Sciences ====
The Faculty of Humanities and Social Sciences offers bachelor's, master's, and Ph.D. degree programs in linguistics and literature.

The faculty also offers a bachelor's of science in psychology and a master's of science in clinical psychology and education subjects.

The faculty has also established joint ventures with other organizations such as the Social Sciences Research Centre (SSRC), in order to tackle the contemporary challenges of society.

==== Faculty of Aerospace Sciences and Strategic Studies ====
The department of Strategic Studies is a department of the Faculty of Aerospace Sciences and Strategic Studies which helps in policy building related to geopolitical, economic, and social areas.

The Department of Aerospace Sciences and Strategic Studies also offers master's degree in strategic studies to civilians and officers of Pakistan Air Force.

==== Institute of Avionics and Aeronautics ====
The Institute of Avionics and Aeronautics (IAA) is a research institute that provides research services in emerging fields such as aerospace propulsion systems, active and passive surveillance systems, communication systems, digital signal processing, guidance and control systems, fluid dynamics, microwave circuit design, and navigation systems.

==== Air University School of Management ====
The Air University School of Management (AUSOM) is a graduate business school of Air University. It offers bachelor's, master's, and Ph.D. degrees in accounting, finance, project management, hospitality management, and human resources (HR).

=== Programs ===
Discipline	Degree Program		
Discipline	BS, BE	MS / M Phil	Ph.D.
Cyber Security	✓	✓	✓
Electrical Engineering (Power/Electronics/Telecom)	✓	✓	✓
Mechatronics Engineering	✓	✓	
Mechanical Engineering	✓	✓	✓
Computer Engineering	✓		
Bio Medical Engineering	✓	✓	✓
Aerospace Engineering		✓	✓
Avionics Engineering		✓	✓
System Security		✓	
Information Security		✓	
Business Administration (BBA)	✓	✓	
Physics	✓	✓	✓
Computer Science	✓	✓	✓
Mathematics	✓	✓	✓
English	✓	✓	✓
Management Sciences		✓	✓
Accounting and Finance	✓		
Computer Games Design	✓		
Information Technology	✓		
Artificial intelligence	✓	✓	
Data science		✓	
Software Engineering	✓		
Strategic Studies		✓	
Psychology	✓	✓	
Education		✓	
Aviation Management	✓		
Health Care Management	✓		
Tourism and Hospitality Management	✓		
Project Management		✓	
Business Analytics		✓	
International Relations (I.R)	✓		
MBBS	✓		

=== Research centers ===
==== CPEC Research Center ====
In February 2018, the CPEC Center of Excellence was established at Air University School of Management, Islamabad. The research center was established with an aim to understand the importance and contributions of export-processing zones (EPZs) in human welfare and particularly maximizing its potential in the post-CPEC scenario.

The center is also working with the Ministry of Overseas Pakistanis to establish a university in Islamabad, Pakistan.

==== National Centre for Cyber Security (NCCS) ====
National Center for Cyber Security was established in May 2018 with the headquarters at Air University, Islamabad. The center was inaugurated by then Federal Minister for Interior, Ahsan Iqbal.

=== Laboratories and research facilities ===
The university maintains state-of-the-art laboratories for research and training purposes. These labs include:

- Aerodynamics laboratory (ADL)
- National centre for cyber-security (NCCS)
- Aerospace sensors and systems Laboratory
- Micro-electro-mechanical-systems (MEMS) Laboratory
- Avionics integration laboratory
- Communication security and embedded systems laboratory
- Computer laboratory
- Computer aided engineering laboratory (CAEL)
- CNC machines and robotics laboratory
- Control engineering laboratory
- Digital electronics laboratory
- Digital signal processing laboratory
- Dynamics and strength laboratory (DSL)
- ECM and radar laboratory
- Electro-optics laboratory
- Electronic systems laboratory
- Embedded systems laboratory
- Fluid mechanics laboratory
- Heat and mass transfer laboratory
- Industrial automation laboratory
- Lego Mindstroms – advanced mechatronics laboratory
- Machine design laboratory
- Materials and structures laboratory (MSL)
- Mechanics of materials laboratory
- Mechanical workshop
- Power electronics and electrical machines laboratory
- Power systems laboratory
- Projects laboratory
- RF and optical communication laboratory
- Thermo fluids and propulsion laboratory (TFPL)
- Thermodynamics laboratory

=== Library ===
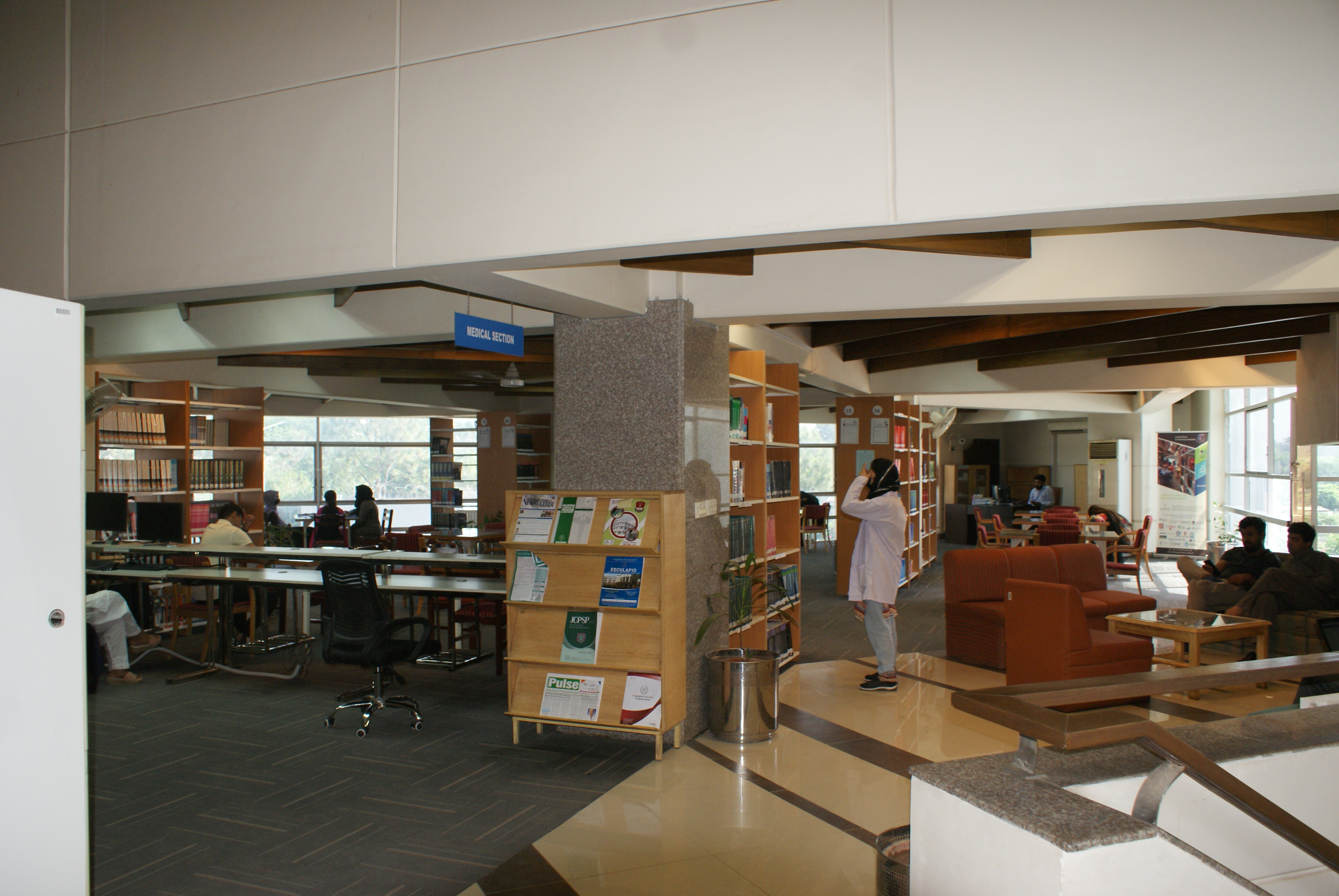
Air University Central Library

The Air University Central Library is the main library of the university and houses about 15,844 volumes of the print collection. Additionally, the library also maintains an active subscription with fifty-one publications and seven newspapers.

The library is also a member of the HEC's National Digital Library Program which provides on-campus access to 22,000 electronic journals and about 140,000 e-books.

The library facilities include six discussion rooms, fifty-six study carrels, and seventy computers for research purposes.

=== Rankings and reputation ===
University rankings

Regional – Overall
- QS Asia: 351–400 (2023)

Among rankings for the engineering category, the Higher Education Commission has ranked Air University on 8th among engineering universities in Pakistan. Among rankings for specific indicators, the Office of Research Innovation & Commercialization (ORIC) has maintained the "W" category in the HEC ranking since 2013.

Among rankings for world universities, Air University received 740th position in Universitas Indonesia (UI) Green Matric World University Ranking published in 2020.

=== Accreditation ===
Accreditation of Degree Programs
Degree Programs	Accredited by
Engineering	Pakistan Engineering Council as per Washington Accord (OBE) Level II
BBA and MS (Management Science)	National Business Education Accreditation Council (NBEAC), Pakistan
BS (Accounting & Finance) program	ACCA, UK (Exemption of 9 modules upon completion of Degree)
Computer Science programs	National Computing Education Accreditation Council (NCEAC), Pakistan
MBBS	Pakistan Medical Commission (PMC)

=== Research ===
- Journal of Business & Economics ISSN 2075-6909

"JBE".

- CPEC Center of Excellence
- National Center for Cyber Security
  - Smart Devices & Networks Security Lab
    - Smart Devices Security
    - Network Cyber Defence
  - National Cyber-crime & Forensics Lab
    - Social Media Forensics
    - Computer Forensics
    - Mobile Forensics
- Corporum: Journal of Corpus Linguistics ISSN 2617-2917
- Corpus Research Centre "CRC".
- Erevna Journal of Linguistics and Literature ISSN 2521-5078"Erevna".

== Office of Research, Innovation, and Commercialization ==
In January 2011, the Office of Research, Innovation, and Commercialization (ORIC) was established at Air University, Islamabad on the directives of the Higher Education Commission, Pakistan. In August 2013, the registration process was completed.

The office has established linkages with stakeholders and has secured research grants from research funding organizations including, the British Council, HEC, Ignite, Pakistan Science Foundation, and Ministry of Science & Technology.

=== Business Incubator Center ===
Air University Business Incubation Center (AUBIC) is currently under the developmental phase.

This center will provide various facilities to incubatees including a conference room, meeting room, separate workstations, and halls for seminars. It will provide networking facilities to entrepreneurs with potential investors and venture capital firms.

== International Cooperation Office (ICO) ==
International Cooperation Office is a department of Air University that helps in the internationalization of the university. The office works to form associations and academic linkages with international universities and colleges and signs memorandum of understandings (MOUs) on the behalf of university.

AU has more than 80 formal and informal international linkages with international higher education institutes of the world.

=== Partner universities ===
- Merseburg University of Applied Sciences
- Kingston University
- Blekinge Institute of Technology
- Mississippi State University
- Nanjing University of Science & Technology
- Beihang University
- Northwestern Polytechnical University
- Nanjing University of Aeronautics and Astronautics
- University of Southampton
- Shenyang Aerospace University
- Gediz University
- Istanbul Medeniyet University
- University of Bedfordshire
- University of Nova Gorica
- National University of Singapore
- King Saud University
- Akdeniz University
- Mersin University
- Istanbul University
- Anadolu University
- Sidi Mohamed Ben Abdellah University
- University of Hassan II Casablanca
- University of Technology Malaysia
- China Women's University
- Wayne State University
- Jiangxi University of Science and Technology
- South China University of Technology
- Shanghai University
- Beijing Technology and Business University
- Technische Universität Darmstadt
- Xinjiang Medical University
- University of Hamburg
- Macquarie University
- Adam Mickiewicz University in Poznań
- Shenzhen University
- Ulster University

== Gallery ==
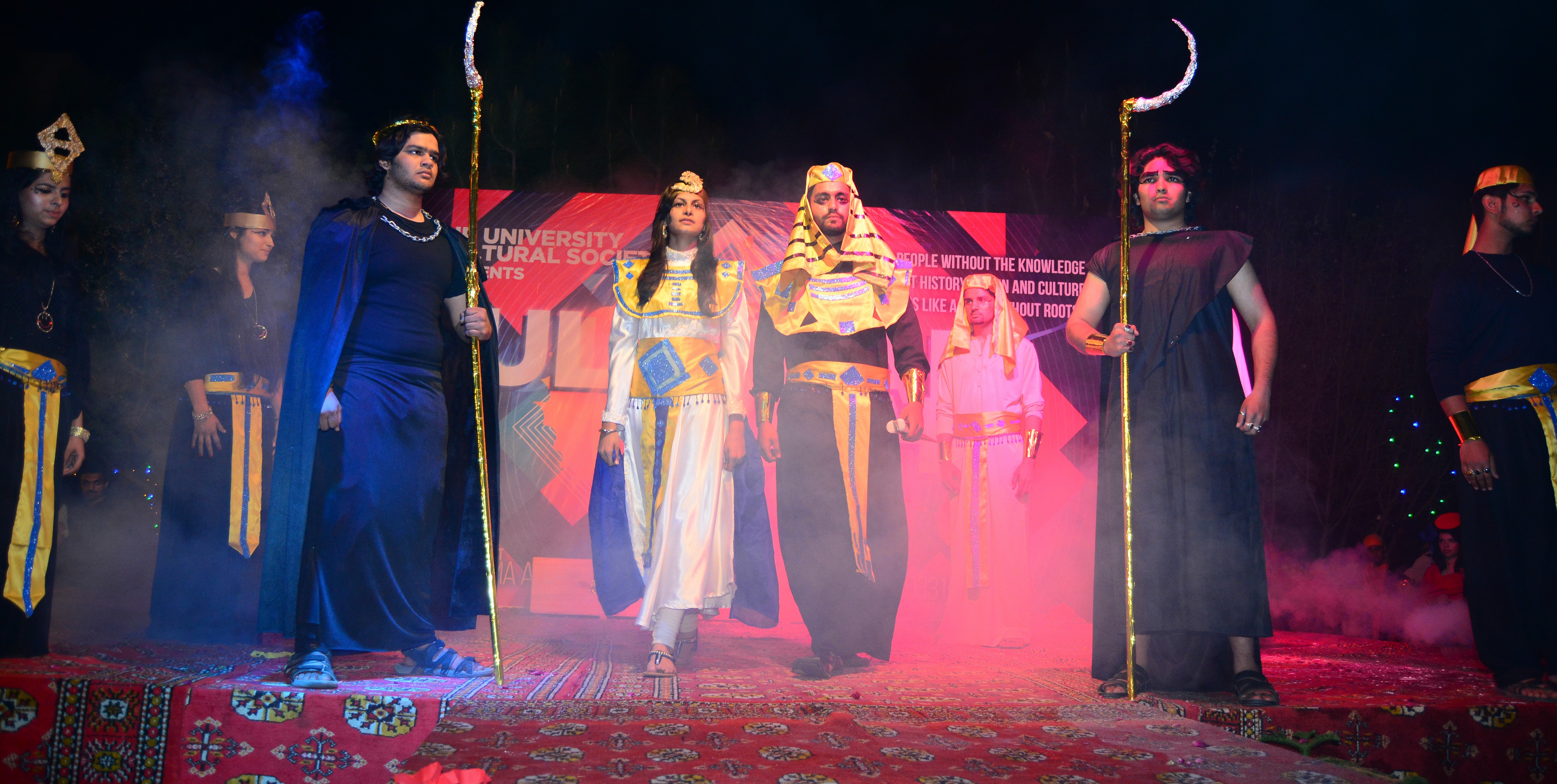
Cultural Night

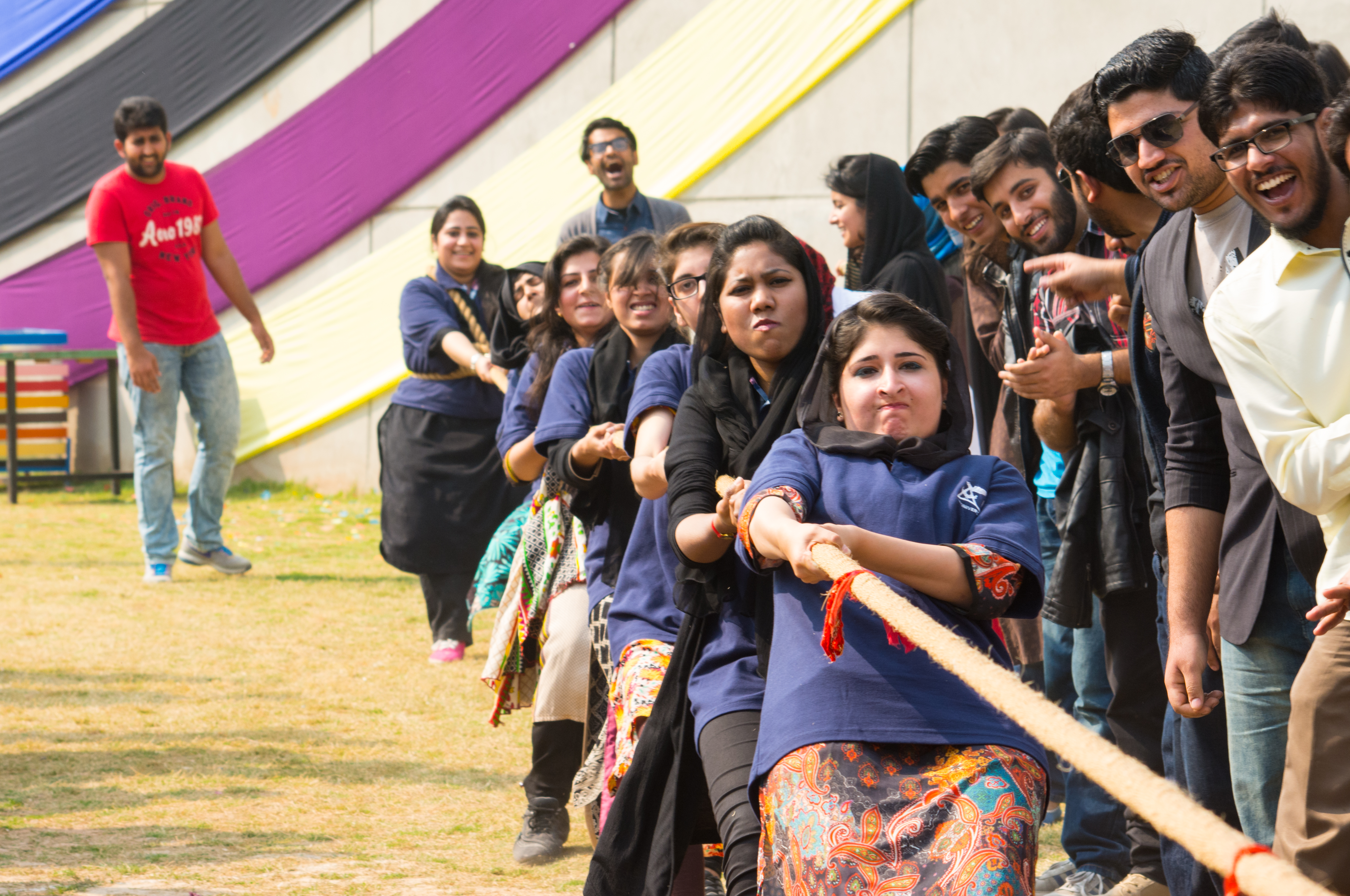
Sportsweek

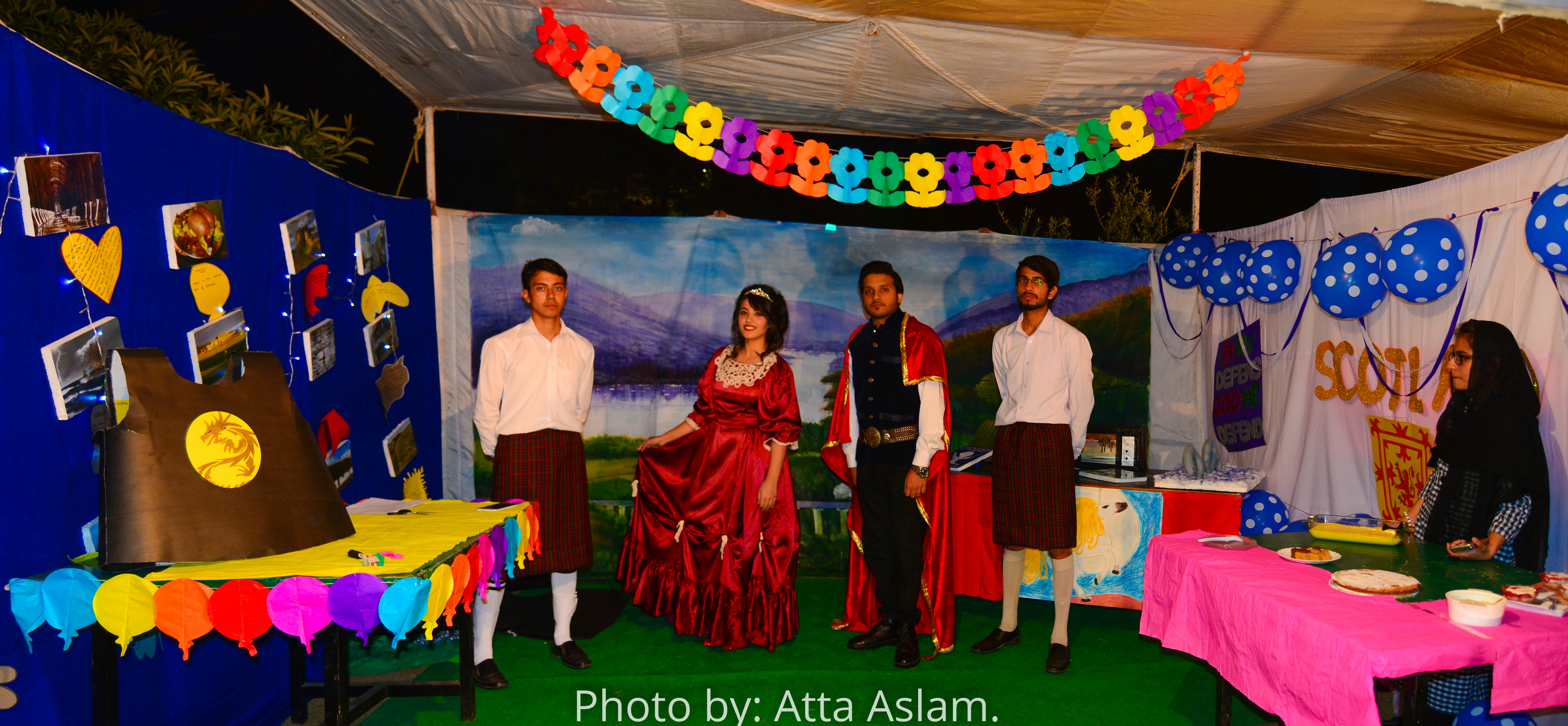
Thespian Night

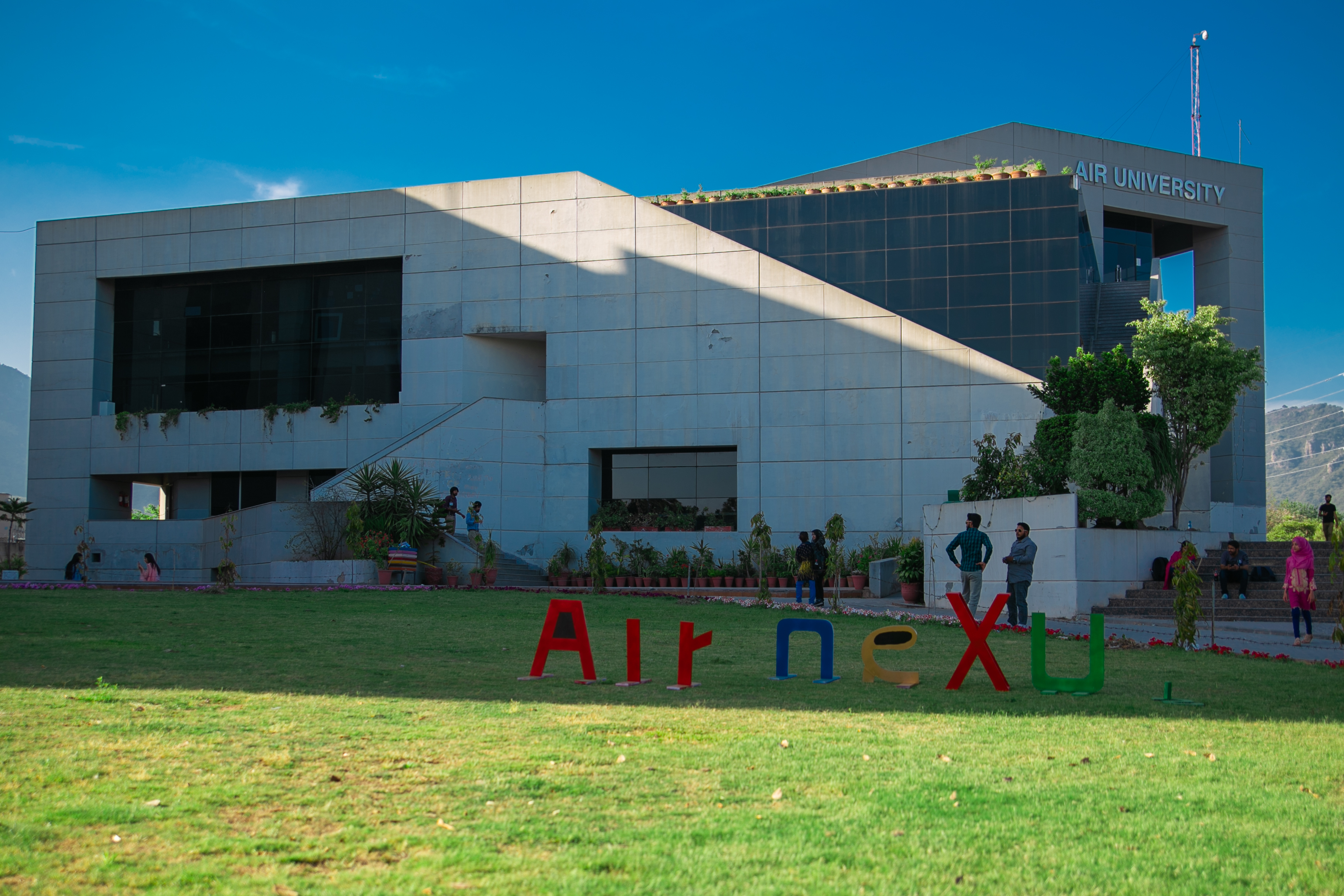
Air neXU

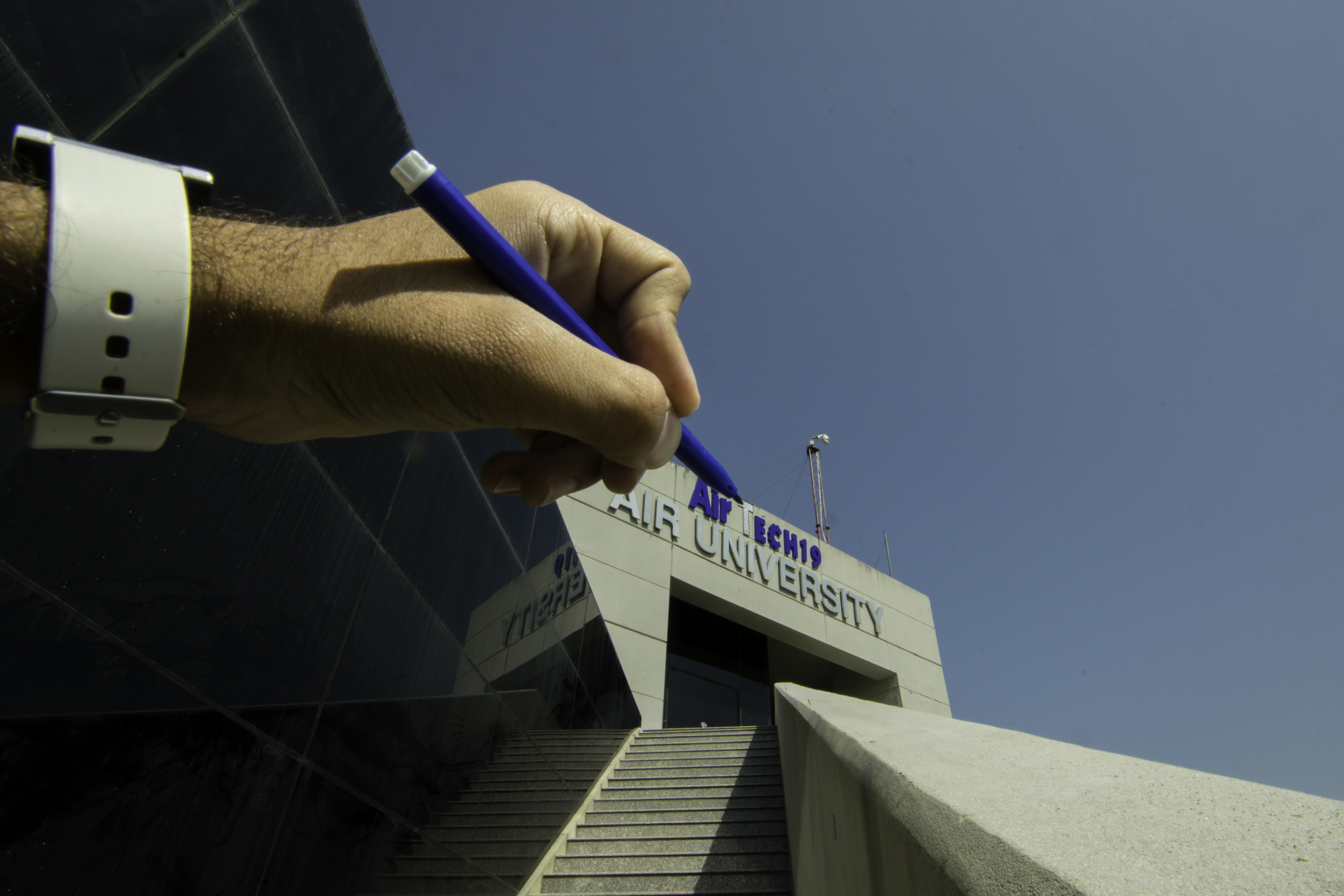
Air Tech

== See also ==
- National Center for Cyber Security
- Higher Education Commission (Pakistan)
- Bahria University
