= Brigitte Sarry =

German chemist

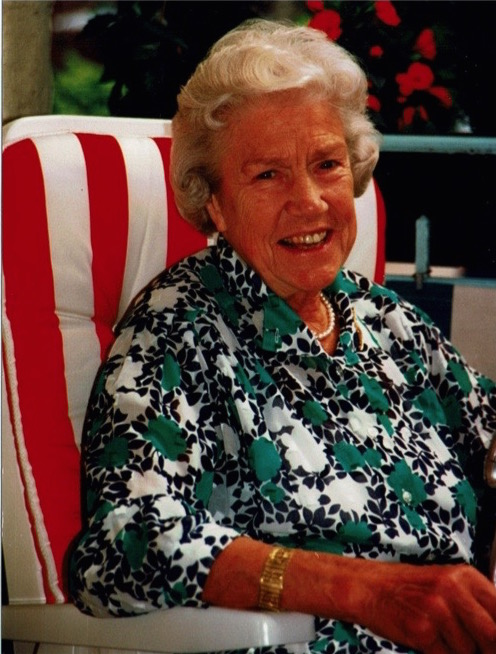
Brigitte Sarry

Brigitte Sarry (6 September 1920 in Allenstein – 19 June 2017 in Berlin) was a German chemist and a professor at Technische Universität Berlin.

== Life ==
Sarry grew up in Allenstein. After moving with her family to Göttingen, she finished her Abitur in Göttingen in 1939. Sarry studied chemistry at the University of Göttingen, interrupted by an interlude at the Ludwig-Maximilians-Universität München. She wrote her diploma thesis as well as her dissertation in the working group of Günther Rienäcker on para-hydrogen conversions on solid solutions of copper and platinum. She started her dissertation in Göttingen and finished it later at the University of Rostock. Brigitte Sarry received her doctorate in Rostock on the 14th of April in 1945. In 1954, she finished her habilitation in Inorganic Chemistry at the University of Rostock. This habilitation focused on the investigation of hydrogen compounds of transition metals. Sarry declined a professorship Technische Hochschule Leuna-Merseburg, did research at the University of Stuttgart, and then worked as a lecturer at the University of Halle. In 1958, Brigitte Sarry fled to West Berlin, where she continued her scientific research under difficult external conditions at today's TU Berlin. She started as a "wissenschaftliche Rätin" and then worked as an extraordinary professor. In March 1969, Sarry was appointed full professor at TU Berlin. She worked there at the Institute of Inorganic and Analytical Chemistry in the field of organometallic compounds of transition elements, and she provided important impulses for the development of homoleptic metal organyls. In autumn 1982, Brigitte Sarry retired early for health reasons.

== Research ==
One of her research topics were homoleptic metal organyls. She was also able to isolate and characterize pyrophoric and thermically unstable solids such as Li_{4}Ta(C_{6}H_{5})_{6} ∙ 3.5 O(C_{2}H_{5})_{2} and Li_{3}Mo(p-C_{6}H_{4}Me)_{6} ∙ 3 O(C_{2}H_{5})_{2}.

== Publications ==
Sarry published the following textbook on general chemistry:

- Sarry, Brigitte (1956). Eigenschaften und Bau der Atome. Urania. ASIN B00709UCES.

She also updated and extended a German translation of a textbook on inorganic chemistry:

- Huheey, James E.; Reuter, Bertold; Sarry, Brigitte (1988). Anorganische Chemie: Prinzipien von Struktur und Reaktivität. Berlin: De Gruyter. ISBN 978-3110081633. OCLC 46194314.
