= Fazaia Medical College =

Medical school in Islamabad, Pakistan

Fazaia Medical College Air university Islamabad
- FMC-AU
- Type: Private
- Established: 2015
- Affiliations: PMC, HEC
- Chairman: Air Chief Marshal
- Vice-Chancellor: Air Marshal Abdul Moeed Khan, HI(M)
- Principal: Maj Gen Muhammad Tahir Khadim, HI(M) (Retd)
- Location: Islamabad, Pakistan
- Campus: Air university PAF Complex Sector E-9 Islamabad
- Website: https://fazaiamedical.edu.pk/

Fazaia Medical College (FMC) is a private sector medical college located in Islamabad, Pakistan. The medical college is a constituent college of Air University, Islamabad. It was founded by the Pakistan Air Force along with Fazaia Ruth Pfau Medical College for undergraduate medical education and training.

== History ==
College was originally established on 16 March 2015 and was inaugurated in December 2015 with the start of first academic year of the college. College is located in the premises of Air University in the secure and scenic environment of PAF Complex and Margala foothills. The college is built on atrium concept of architecture to ensure conducive and congenial environment for education. The college has highly qualified and well experienced faculty.

== Programs ==
The FMC college offers undergraduate programs of MBBS at its attached teaching hospital.

== Faculty ==
The college has four main faculties:

- Faculty of Basic Science
- Faculty of Clinical Science
- Faculty of Medical Education
- Faculty of Clinical Skills and Simulation
