= Nishan-e-Quaid-e-Azam =

Pakistani civil award for leadership

Nishan-i-Quaid-i-Azam
- Type: Civil award
- Established: March 1957
- Country: Pakistan
- Status: Currently awarded

Precedence
- Next (higher): None
- Next (lower): Hilal-i-Quaid-i-Azam

Nishan-i-Quaid-i-Azam (Urdu: نشانِ قائداعظم) is a civil decoration awarded by the Government of Pakistan. It is the highest honour in the Order of Quaid-i-Azam, established in March 1957. The award is named after Muhammad Ali Jinnah, the founder of Pakistan, who is referred to as "Quaid-i-Azam".

== Purpose ==
The award is conferred on individuals, including foreign nationals, in recognition of their exceptional leadership and distinguished service to the state of state of Pakistan, particularly in the fields of international diplomacy, public service, or advancement of the national interest.

== Conferment ==
Recipients are selected by the President of Pakistan upon recommendations made through the Cabinet Division. The awards are usually announced annually on Pakistan Day (23 March) and presented on Independence Day (14 August) or another official ceremony.

== Notable recipients of Nishan‑i‑Quaid‑i‑Azam ==
- Ruth Pfau (Germany/Pakistan) – Awarded in 2010 for her decades-long leprosy eradication work with the Marie Adelaide Leprosy Centre in Pakistan.
- Sadiq Muhammad Khan Abbasi V (Pakistan – former Nawab of Bahawalpur) – Awarded 1959, recognized for public service during his tenure; listed in official honours.
- John Berchmans Conway was an Irish Roman Catholic religious sister and teacher who worked in Pakistan for 60 years.
- Lee Kuan Yew – Awarded in 1988, recognized for being one of Asia's ablest leaders whose forward-looking policies have policies and propelled Singapore to a high level of economic development and affluence.
