= Ruth Pfau =

German-Pakistani physician and nun

HP HI NQA SQA OM Ruth Pfau FCM
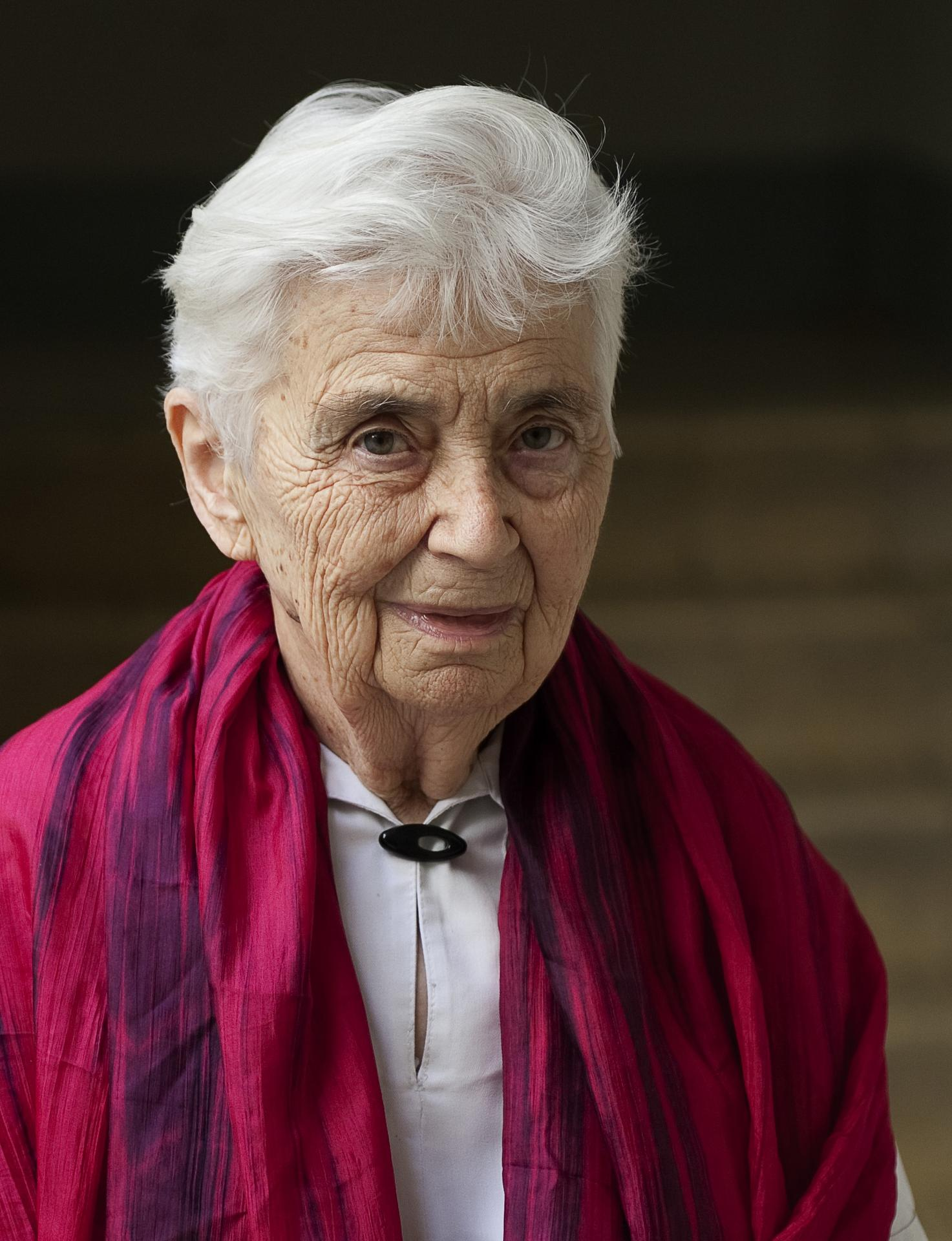
- Born: Ruth Katherina Martha Pfau; 9 September 1929; Leipzig, Weimar Republic
- Died: 10 August 2017 (aged 87); Karachi, Sindh, Pakistan
- Resting place: Gora Qabaristan, Karachi
- Monuments: Dr. Ruth Pfau Hospital
- Education: University of Mainz
- Occupations: Nun, physician, writer
- Organization: Marie Adelaide Leprosy Centre
- Notable work: National Leprosy Control
- Awards: Full list

Ruth Katherina Martha Pfau, FCM (Urdu: رتھ فاؤ; 9 September 1929 – 10 August 2017) was a German–Pakistani Catholic religious sister and physician who was a member of the Society of the Daughters of the Heart of Mary. She emigrated from Germany in 1961 and devoted more than 55 years of her life to fighting leprosy in Pakistan. Pfau was honoured with Hilal-e-Pakistan, Hilal-i-Imtiaz, Nishan-i-Quaid-i-Azam, and the Sitara-i-Quaid-i-Azam awards.

Pfau contributed to the establishment of 157 leprosy clinics across Pakistan that treated over 56,780 people. Fazaia Ruth Pfau Medical College and Dr. Ruth Pfau Hospital are named after her in Karachi. She died in August 2017 and was buried with full state honours.

== Early life ==
Pfau was born on 9 September 1929 in Leipzig, Germany, to Lutheran Christian parents. She had four sisters and one brother. Her home was destroyed by bombing during World War II. Following the post-war Soviet occupation of East Germany she moved to West Germany along with her family, and chose medicine as her future career. During the 1950s, she studied medicine at the University of Mainz. During this period Pfau frequently met a Dutch Christian woman who was a concentration camp survivor and was dedicating her life to "preaching love and forgiveness". After "her life-changing experience", Pfau left "a romantic association" with a fellow student and became involved in discussions in Mainz's philosophy and classical literature department. After completing her clinical examination, Pfau moved to Marburg to carry on her clinical studies. She was baptised as a Protestant in 1951, before her conversion to Roman Catholicism in 1953. Pfau stated that she learned the "courage of being human" from Saint Thomas Aquinas through Josef Pieper's writing. She joined a Catholic parish, and she was greatly influenced by Romano Guardini's The Lord in this period.

In 1957, Pfau travelled to Paris and joined the Daughters of the Heart of Mary, a Catholic order. She said, "When you receive such a calling, you cannot turn it down, for it is not you who has made the choice. ... God has chosen you for himself." The order later sent her to southern India; however, in 1960, a visa issue meant she had to stay in Karachi. She travelled to various parts of Pakistan and across the border to Afghanistan to rescue patients who were abandoned by their families or locked in small rooms for a lifetime.

== Life in Pakistan ==
Pfau in c. 2000

Not all of us can prevent a war; but most of us can help ease sufferings—of the body and the soul.

— Ruth Pfau

In 1960, aged 31, Pfau decided to dedicate the rest of her life to the people of Pakistan and their battle against leprosy outbreaks. While in Karachi, by chance she visited the Lepers' Colony behind McLeod Road (now I. I. Chundrigar Road) near the City Railway Station. Here she decided that the care of patients would be her life's calling. She started medical treatment for the leprosy patients in a hut in this area. The Marie Adelaide Leprosy Centre was founded (which later branched out into tuberculosis and blindness prevention programmes) and social work for the leprosy patients and their family members was started by Dr I K Gill. A leprosy clinic was bought in April 1963 and patients from all over Karachi, from elsewhere in Pakistan, and even from Afghanistan came for treatment.

In 1979, she was appointed as the Federal Advisor on Leprosy to the Ministry of Health and Social Welfare of Government of Pakistan. Pfau went to distant areas of Pakistan where there were no medical facilities for leprosy patients. She collected donations in Germany and Pakistan and co-operated with hospitals in Rawalpindi and Karachi. In recognition of her service to the country, she was awarded Pakistani citizenship in 1988.

Due to her continued efforts, in 1996 the World Health Organization declared Pakistan one of the first countries in Asia to have controlled leprosy. According to the Dawn, the number of leprosy cases nationwide dropped significantly from 19,398 in the early 1980s to 531 in 2016.

On 9 September 1999, the Archbishop of Karachi, Simeon Anthony Pereira, celebrated a Mass at St. Patrick's Cathedral to celebrate Pfau's 70th birthday, which was attended by both Christians and Muslims.

== Death ==
In the early morning on 10 August 2017, around 4:00 AM PKT, Pfau died at the Aga Khan University Hospital in Karachi after being admitted there due to respiratory problems on 4 August 2017. She was put on a ventilator after her condition worsened on 6 August. She refused life support, which her doctors removed the next day, according to her wish for "living a natural life". Pfau had been dealing with several health problems due to her advanced age, including kidney and heart disease, for which she had been undergoing treatment for several years.

=== Reaction ===
President Mamnoon Hussain issued the statement: "Dr Pfau’s services to end leprosy in Pakistan cannot be forgotten. She left her homeland and made Pakistan her home to serve humanity. The Pakistani nation salutes Dr Pfau and her great tradition to serve humanity will be continued."

Prime Minister Shahid Khaqan Abbasi said: "Dr Ruth Pfau may have been born in Germany, [but] her heart was always in Pakistan." He further added that, "she came here at the dawn of a young nation looking to make lives better for those afflicted by disease and in doing so found herself a home. We will remember her for her courage, her loyalty, her service to the eradication of leprosy and most of all her patriotism." He also announced that a state funeral would be held for her.

Chief of Army Staff Qamar Bajwa referred to Pfau as an "ambassador of humanity".

Chief of Air Staff Air Chief Marshal Sohail Aman named a medical college, being built at an airbase in Karachi, in her name. The college is now named as "Fazaia Ruth Pfau Medical College". Its first classes are expected to commence in December 2019.

=== State funeral ===
On 19 August 2017, Pfau's body lay in state at the Holy Family Hospital in Karachi ahead of the funeral. The state funeral for Pfau was held at Saint Patrick's Cathedral, in front of which the flags of Pakistan and Vatican City were flown at half mast, with Archbishop Joseph Coutts presiding over the Requiem. The Pakistani flag was draped over her coffin and a 19-gun salute was offered by contingents of all three wings of the Pakistan Armed Forces. The ceremony was broadcast live on Pakistan Television. Pfau was reportedly the first Christian and first non-Muslim to have a state funeral in Pakistan. She was then buried at Gora Qabaristan, a Christian cemetery in Karachi.

== Legacy ==
Pfau is well respected by Muslims in Pakistan who were the majority of patients at the Marie Adelaide Leprosy Centre. Saleem Maseh Amir says that she never talked about religion, yet "her faith, service, and love" were demonstrations of the spirit that inspired inter-religious dialogue.

In 2018, Pfau's private residence in Karachi was converted into a museum to showcase some of her personal possessions.

== Awards and recognition ==
Pfau is remembered in Pakistan and abroad as a distinguished human being, and had been awarded many awards and medals. On 23 March 1989, Pfau received the Hilal-i-Pakistan award presented by the then-President of Pakistan Ghulam Ishaq Khan at the President House for her work with leprosy patients.

Speaking at a function in Islamabad on 30 January 2000 to mark the 47th World Leprosy Day, the then-President Rafiq Tarar praised Pfau, who built up the National Leprosy Control Program in Pakistan, for working not only for those afflicted with leprosy but also for those with tuberculosis. In 2006, Pfau was honoured as the 'Woman of the Year 2006' by City FM89.

On 14 August 2010, on the occasion of Pakistan's Independence Day, the then-President of Pakistan Asif Ali Zardari awarded Pfau the Nishan-i-Quaid-i-Azam for public service. She was hailed as Pakistan's "Mother Teresa" after her work towards helping people displaced by the 2010 Pakistan floods. In 2015, Pfau was awarded the Staufer Medal, the highest award of the German state of Baden-Württemberg.

On 19 August 2017, Sindh Chief Minister Syed Murad Ali Shah announced renaming of the Civil Hospital Karachi to Dr Ruth Pfau Hospital as an acknowledgment of "selfless services of the late social servant".

On 9 September 2019, Google honoured her with a Google Doodle of her treating a patient.

In February 2020, the President of Pakistan Dr. Arif Alvi inaugurated the Fazaia Ruth Pfau Medical College in Karachi. The college was established by the Pakistan Air Force.

On 10 August 2026, a documentary about Pfau premeried at a short film competition held during Pakistan Minority Week, where it won third prize.

== Honours ==
- 1969: Order of Merit (Germany)
- 1969: Sitara i Quaid i Azam
- 1979: Hilal-e-Imtiaz
- 1989: Hilal-i-Pakistan
- 2002: Ramon Magsaysay Award
- 2003: Jinnah Award from the Jinnah Society
- 2004: Doctor of Science (DSc), honoris causa. Aga Khan University, Karachi.
- 2010: Nishan-i-Quaid-i-Azam for public service.
- 2017: Civil Hospital, Karachi renamed to Dr Ruth K.M. Pfau Hospital
- The Pakistan Mint will issue 50,000 commemorative coins in honor of Dr Pfau.

== Books ==
- To Light a Candle: Reminiscences and Reflections of Dr Ruth Pfau. Islamabad: National Book Foundation. 1987. OCLC 19537050.
- Wer keine Tränen hat: was mein Leben trägt. Verlag Herder. 2000. ISBN 978-3-451-04924-8.
- Verrückter kann man gar nicht leben: Ärztin, Nonne, Powerfrau. Verlag Herder. 2004. ISBN 978-3-451-04913-2.
- Das Herz hat seine Gründe: mein Weg. Verlag Herder. 2005. ISBN 978-3-451-05593-5.
- Liebe und tu, was du willst: Wege meines Lebens. Verlag Herder. 2006. ISBN 978-3-451-05617-8.
- Ma vie, une pure folie: médecin, religieuse, battante. Editions Saint-Augustin. 2007. ISBN 9782880113926.
- Und hätte die Liebe nicht: 50 Jahre in Pakistan. Verlag Herder. 2010. ISBN 978-3-451-30297-8.
- Leben heißt anfangen: Worte, die das Herz berühren. Verlag Herder. 2014. ISBN 978-3-451-06652-8.
- The Last Word Is Love: Adventure, Medicine, War and God. Crossroad Publishing Company. 2017. ISBN 978-0-8245-2369-5.

== Sources ==
- Mutaher, Zia (2004). Serving the Unserved: The Life of Dr Ruth Pfau. Karachi: City Press. ISBN 9698380728.
- Pflughaupt, Bengt (2004). Ruth Pfau, mit den Augen der Liebe: als Reporter unterwegs mit einer ungewöhnlichen Frau im wilden Pakistan. Freiburg: Herder. ISBN 9783451285424.
