= Mervyn Lobo =

Pakistani health activist

Mervyn Lobo SI
- Born: Mervyn Francis Lobo
- Education: St. Patrick's High School, Karachi, Master of Business Administration (1982)
- Occupation: Health activist
- Known for: Marie Adelaide Leprosy Centre
- Awards: Sitara-e-Imtiaz (2023); Order of Merit of the Federal Republic of Germany (2024)
- Website: malc.org.pk

Mervyn Francis Lobo is the chief executive officer of the Karachi-based Marie Adelaide Leprosy Centre (MALC). Following Ruth Pfau, Lobo manages the MALC's nationwide humanitarian efforts by focusing on treatment of leprosy, tuberculosis (TB) and blindness.

Lobo is renowned for his tireless efforts in combating leprosy throughout Karachi, Balochistan, the interior of Sindh province, and among Afghan refugees.

He has been honoured with several awards, most notably the Sitara-e-Imtiaz (Star of Excellence) by the Government of Pakistan in 2023 and the Cross of Merit with Ribbon of the Order of Merit of the Federal Republic of Germany in 2024 for his work as health activist at MALC.
