= National Centre for Cyber Security =

Pakistani research centre

- Abbreviation: NCCS
- Formation: June 2018
- Headquarters: Islamabad, Pakistan
- Parent organisation: Higher Education Commission (HEC) and the Planning Commission
- Website: nccs.pk

The National Centre for Cyber Security (NCCS) is a government-established research and development centre founded by the Pakistani government in June 2018. This project is a collaborative effort between the Higher Education Commission (HEC) and the Planning Commission.

== History ==
The NCCS project represents a collaboration between the Higher Education Commission (HEC) and the Planning Commission. It involves the establishment of Research and Development (R&D) Labs in selected universities across Pakistan. The universities were chosen through a competitive process initiated by HEC in early 2018, and after careful evaluation, 11 technical proposals were shortlisted. These universities were then tasked with setting up NCCS-affiliated labs specialising in various areas of cyber security under the centre's secretariat. The Air University was granted the responsibility of serving as the NCCS Secretariat, in addition to overseeing the two affiliated labs focusing on Cyber Crime Forensics and Smart Devices and Networks Security.
