= Pakistan–Poland relations =

- Pakistan: Poland

Pakistan–Poland relations are the bilateral relations between Poland and Pakistan, which date back to the 1940s. After the Independence of Pakistan on August 14, 1947, Liaquat Ali Khan, the first Prime minister of Pakistan, made the first diplomatic approaches to the People's Republic of Poland and finally, on December 17, 1962, Pakistan became one of the first Muslim countries to establish relations with then-communist government of Poland.

Poland opened an embassy in Karachi in 1962, but moved it to Islamabad Capital Venue in 1965. The Pakistani Government opened its embassy in Warsaw in 1969. Currently, Poland also maintains a cultural Consulate-General in Karachi as well as an honorary Consulate-General in Lahore.

== History ==
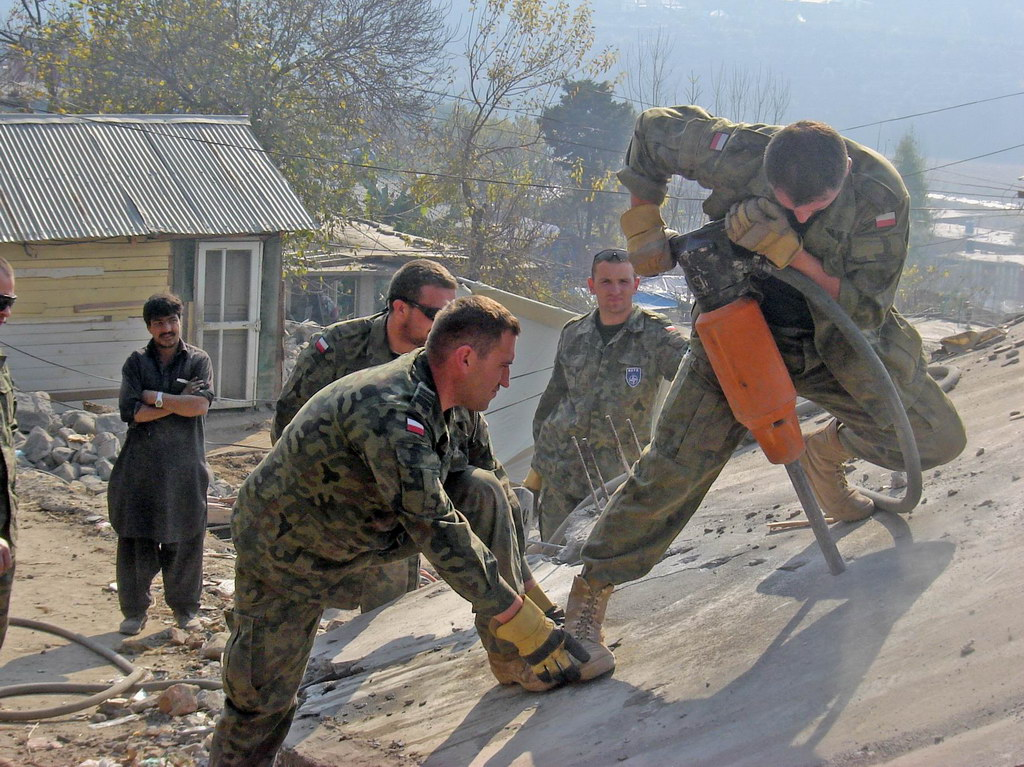
Polish military engineers carrying out humanitarian aid after the 2005 Pakistan earthquake.

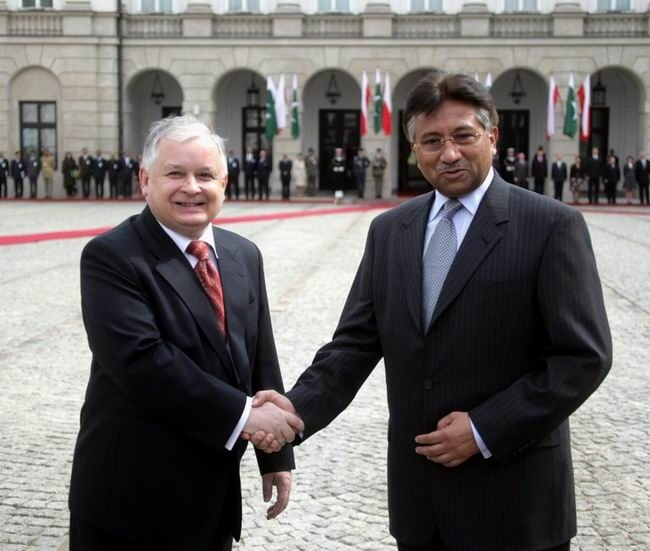
President of Pakistan Pervez Musharraf with President of Poland Lech Kaczyński during his state visit to Poland in 2007

Polish ties with Pakistan date back to World War II.

In September 1939 the Soviet Union under Joseph Stalin had annexed Eastern Poland in cooperation with Nazi Germany, displacing many Poles, and triggering the outbreak of the Second World War with the Allies, including the British Empire. Once Nazi Germany attacked the USSR in June 1941, the British Empire and USSR established friendly relations and efforts were made to improve conditions for displaced Poles. Between August 24, 1942 and December 31, 1944 Polish refugees were evacuated from the USSR via the "Persian Corridor" in Iran and over thirty thousand of them were housed in refugee camps and were settled in Karachi (then part of British India), which was the nearest major port. Some remained in Karachi, becoming citizens of the newly established State of Pakistan in 1947.

During World War II, the city of Karachi, the chief port in the territory that would become Pakistan, hosted around 30,000 Polish refugees.

Some Polish academics joined the faculty of Karachi University, teaching courses ranging from physical sciences to social sciences. After the independence of Pakistan, Władysław Turowicz, along with thirty Polish officers and technicians, contributed to and assisted in the establishment of the Pakistan Air Force. On 14 August 2006, a memorial was erected in the Pakistan Air Force Museum in Karachi to acknowledge the services of the Polish airmen led by Air Commodore Turowicz.

On the 1st of November 1970 the Polish Deputy Foreign Minister Zygfryd Wolniak was killed at Karachi airport during a welcome ceremonies by a Pakistan International Airlines employee and anti-communist Islamic fundamentalist named Mohammed Feroze Abdullah who was trying to kill the entire delegation but aiming for Polish President Marian Spychalski in particular. Driving a PIA cargo lorry at high speed he mowed down the delegation, narrowly missing his intended target. The other three victims were Pakistani; the deputy director of the Intelligence Bureau, Chaudhri Mohammed Nazir, and two government photographers. His stated motivation to interrogators was his desire to kill socialists, believing that socialists and socialism were against Islam and Muslims. This occurred on the eve of Pakistan's first general elections in which right-wing Islamic parties such as the Jamaati Islami (whose main stronghold at the time was Karachi) were employing highly incendiary rhetoric against socialists as part of their elections campaigns. Feroze was sentenced to death by a special military court on May 10, 1971, but permitted to appeal for clemency.

=== Defence ties ===
In 1948, Prime Minister Liaquat Ali Khan sanctioned a three-year agreement with exiled members and officers of the Polish Air Force to build the Pakistan Air Force (PAF). Among them was General Władysław Turowicz, who became Deputy Chief of Air Staff in the PAF. The Polish officers and General Turowicz set up technical institutes, notably the Air Force Institute of Aviation Technology in Karachi. As the chief scientist of the Pakistan Air Force Academy he taught at and revitalized the school. He initially supervised technical training at the airbase and some of the Polish specialists in the technical section in Karachi.

The Polish officers played an active part in the Indo-Pakistani War of 1965, leading and commanding air war operations against the Indian Air Force. The Polish officers helped defend Lahore and West Pakistan. The Pakistan Government bestowed the Sitara-e-Pakistan on General Turowicz, Major Anotnii Zbigniew Jedryszek and others; Turowicz and some of the pilots also received honorary Pakistani citizenship. General Turowicz and his family remained vital figures in Pakistan. In 1972 Turowicz and other Polish scientists participated in Pakistan's secret atomic bomb project. Polish scientists also helped the country to launch its space programme, with General Turowicz becoming the program's technical director in 1967.

== Economic Cooperation ==
The trading relationship between Pakistan and Poland developed during the Government of Prime Minister of Pakistan Zulfikar Ali Bhutto. Poland and Pakistan signed a trade agreement on avoidance of double taxation on September 25, 1974. Pakistan and Poland signed another agreement on maritime trade on January 25, 1975. An agreement on civil aviation was signed on September 30, 1977. Trade relations improved when President Pervez Musharraf paid a three-day official visit to Poland in April 2007. This was the first ever visit by a head of state of Pakistan to Poland. During his visit, President Musharraf had many engagements in the Polish capital, which included official talks with his Polish counterpart, Lech Kaczyński, and the Polish Prime Minister Jarosław Kaczyński. Five bilateral agreements and memoranda of understanding (MoUs) covering mutually beneficial co-operation in the fields of defense, small and medium size enterprises, education, science, culture, economic co-operation, were signed with the Federation of Pakistan Chambers of Commerce and Industry.

== Resident diplomatic missions ==
- Pakistan has an embassy in Warsaw.
- Poland has an embassy in Islamabad.
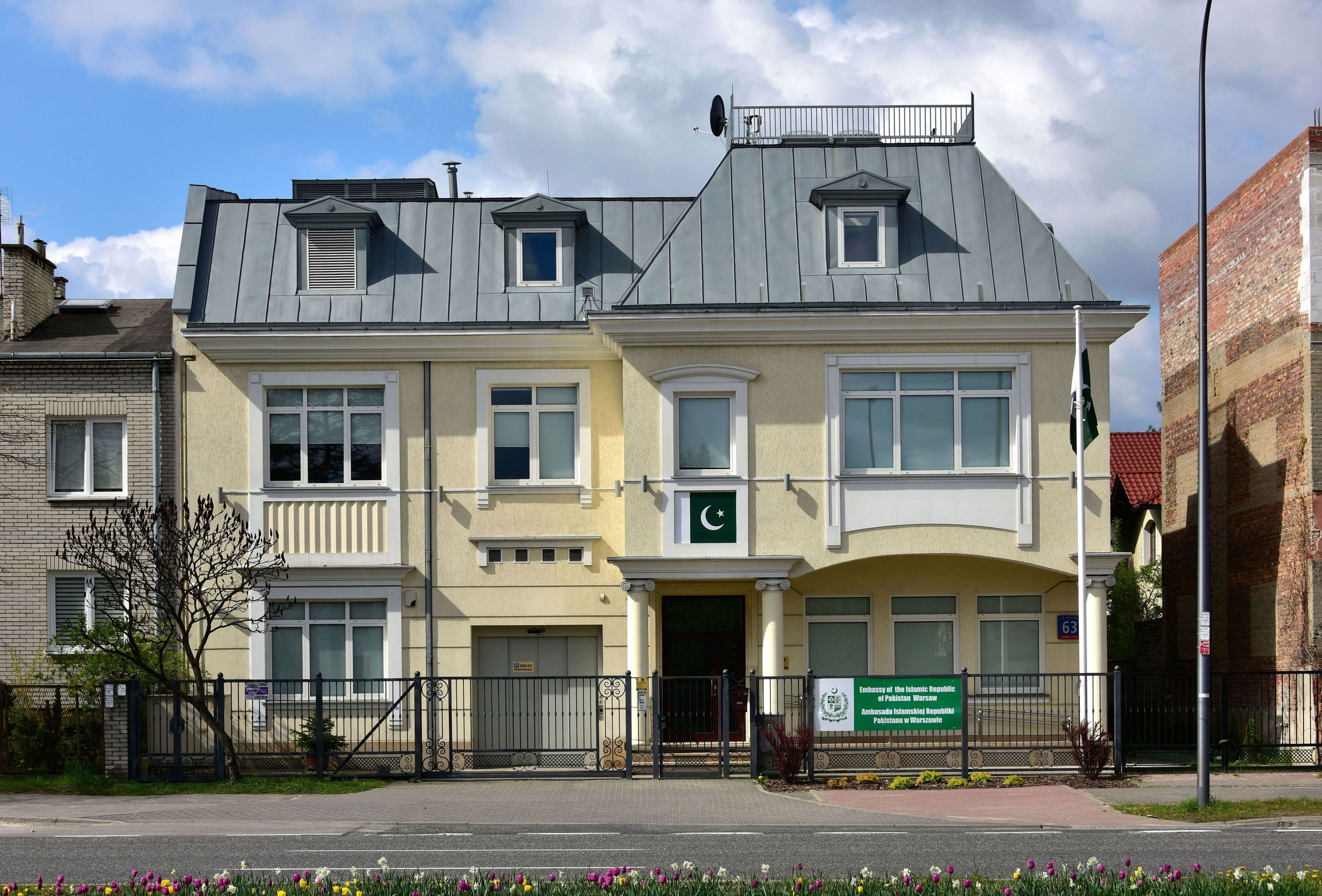
Embassy of Pakistan in Warsaw

== See also ==
- Foreign relations of Pakistan
- Foreign relations of Poland
