= Margit Rätzsch =

German chemist

Margit Theresa Rätzsch
- Born: 13 September 1934; Teplice-Šanov, Czechoslovakia
- Died: 15 August 2016 (aged 81); Merseburg, Germany
- Education: University of Leipzig
- Occupation: Chemist

Margit Theresa Rätzsch (13 September 1934 - 15 August 2016) was a German chemist. She was rector at Technical University Leuna-Merseburg.

== Life ==
Rätzsch was born in Teplice-Šanov in the Sudetenland, then Czechoslovakia (now Czech Republic).

She studied physics at the University of Leipzig from 1952-1956. In 1959 she moved to the Technical University for Chemistry Leuna-Merseburg, where she held the position of scientific assistant and assistant to the Vice Rector for Research until 1964. It was in this year that she also received her doctorate, enabling her to move immediately into a job as a senior assistant. She completed this phase of her work in 1968 with her habilitation.

Starting in 1969, she became a lecturer and then a professor of physical chemistry at the “Carl Schorlemmer” Technical University in Leuna-Merseburg. In addition, she was appointed director of the process chemistry section. From 1981 to 1990, she was rector at the university.

With the dismantling of the technical college on 31 March 1993, Rätzsch entered early retirement and continued to live in Merseburg.

In 1985, she chaired a five-day UNESCO meeting of 16 experts from 15 countries about "Participation of Women in Various Areas of Higher Education" held in Wroclaw, Poland, in December.

She died in Merseburg in 2016.

== Research ==
Rätzsch's research concentrated on physical chemistry and chemical thermodynamics.

== Selected publications ==
- Intermolecular interactions and structure in liquid non-electrolytes. Meeting reports of the Academy of Sciences of the GDR, born in 1978, No. 4 N: Mathematics, Natural Sciences, Technology. Akademie publishing house, Berlin 1978.
- Core effect in low-molecular fluid systems. Meeting reports of the Academy of Sciences of the GDR, born in 1978, No. 4 N: Mathematics, Natural Sciences, Technology. Akademie Verlag, Berlin 1978 (with Rainer Patz).
- Thermodynamics and biological development. Meeting reports of the Academy of Sciences of the GDR, born 1980, No. 2 N: mathematics, natural sciences, technology. Akademie publishing house, Berlin 1980.
- Proceedings / 6th [Sixth] International Conference on Thermodynamics. Merseburg, August 26–29, 1980 / Techn. Hochsch. Leuna-Merseburg, German Democrat. Republic. [Sponsored by the International Union of Pure and Applied Chemistry . Organized by the Carl Schorlemmer Techn. Univ., Leuna-Merseburg in collab. with the Chem. Soc. of the German Democrat. Republic. Chairperson: Margit T. Rätzsch]. Publisher: Technical University, Leuna-Merseburg 1980.
- Continuous thermodynamics of multicomponent mixtures. Meeting reports of the Academy of Sciences of the GDR, born 1982, No. 13 N: mathematics, natural sciences, technology. Akademie Verlag, Berlin 1983 (with H. Kehlen).
- Continuous thermodynamics of copolymer systems. Meeting reports of the Academy of Sciences of the GDR, born 1990, No. 4 N: Mathematics, Natural Sciences, Technology. Akademie Verlag, Berlin 1983, ISBN 3-05-500848-0 (with Christian Wohlfarth).

== Awards ==
Rätzsch received the following awards:

- National Prize of the German Democratic Republic in 1984
- August Kekulé medal in 1987
- Member of the Berlin-Brandenburg Academy of Sciences and Humanities
