= Merseburg University of Applied Sciences =

University in Merseburg, Germany

University of Merseburg
- Hochschule Merseburg - University of Applied Sciences
- Type: Public
- Established: April 1, 1992
- Rector: Markus Krabbes
- Faculty: 342
- Students: 3026 (2023/24)
- Location: Merseburg, Germany
- Campus: Suburban
- Website: hs-merseburg.de

The Merseburg University of Applied Sciences (German: Hochschule Merseburg - University of Applied Sciences) is an institution of higher education (a vocational university) located in the town of Merseburg, Germany. It was established on April 1, 1992. Its precursor was the Technische Hochschule Leuna-Merseburg.

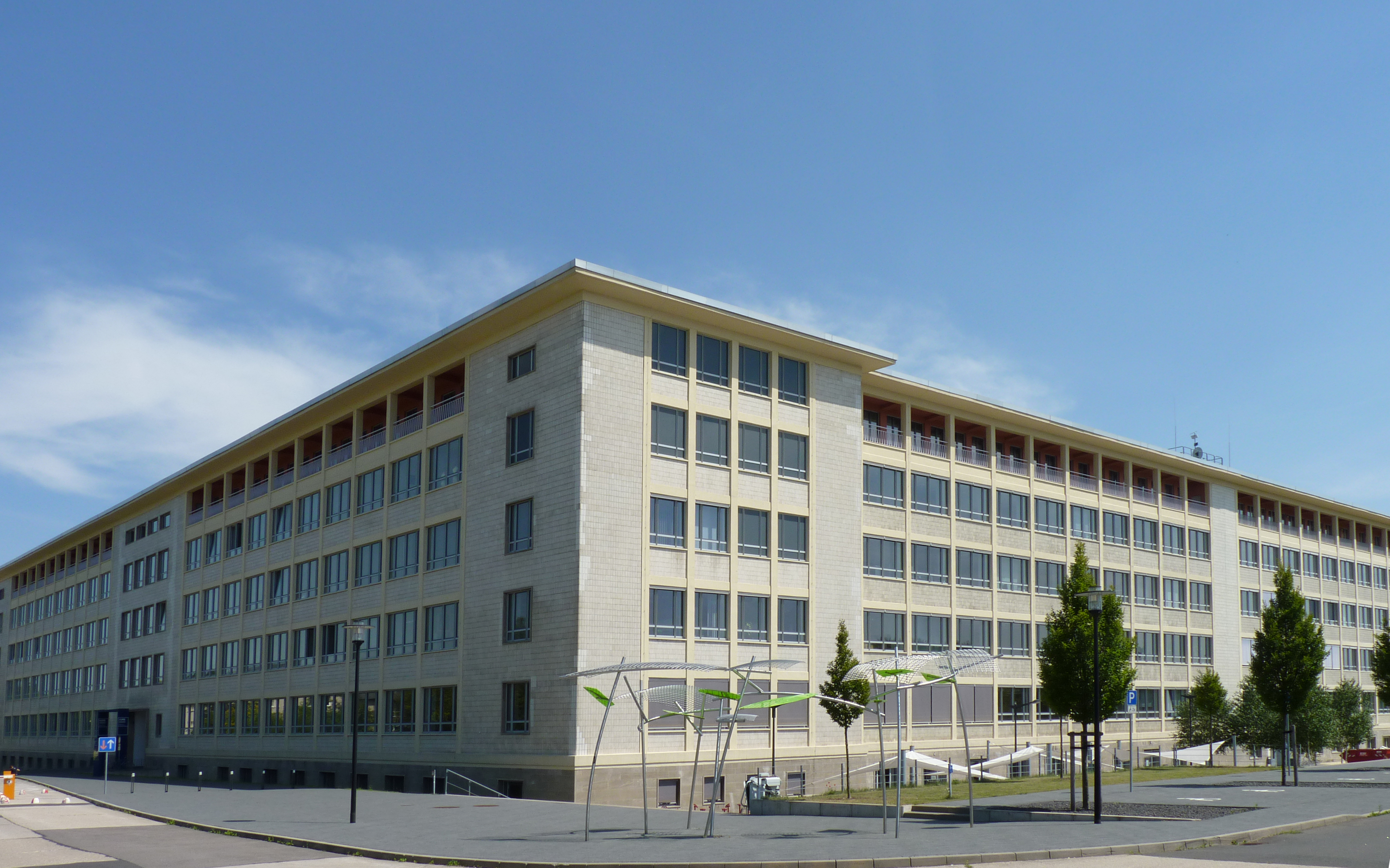
The main building at the campus
