= Marie Adelaide Leprosy Centre =

Hospital in Karachi, Pakistan

Geography
- Location: Mariam Manzil, A.M. 21, Off Shahrah-e-Liaquat, Saddar Karachi, Sindh, Pakistan

Organisation
- Care system: Free
- Type: Full-service leprosy treatment and rehabilitation center
- Religious affiliation: Roman Catholic
- Patron: Dr. Ruth Pfau HI, HPk, NQA
- Network: 70 relief centers across Pakistan

Services
- Beds: 80

History
- Opened: 1962

Links
- Website: http://www.malc.org.pk/
- Lists: Hospitals in Pakistan

Marie Adelaide Leprosy Centre (MALC) in Karachi, Pakistan was run by Dr. Ruth Pfau, who was also a Roman Catholic religious sister of the Society of Daughters of the Heart of Mary, originally of German descent. Mervyn Lobo is the current chief executive officer of MALC.

== History ==
Its social work department was founded in 1962 by Dr. I. K. Gill and work for the leprosy patients and their family members was started. A Leprosy Clinic was bought in April 1963 and patients from all over Pakistan and even from Afghanistan came for treatment.

In two years' time, MALC was transferred to a proper hospital building and established a full-service leprosy treatment and rehabilitation center, free to patients. Volunteer specialists helped, but the staff consists mainly of former patients trained to diagnose and treat the disease and to keep records. Meanwhile, Dr. Pfau took note of the home districts of her patients and identified Pakistan's leprosy belt-the first step in creating a national program of eradication.

Inadequate resources and budget cuts for Pakistan's anti-leprosy program may herald a revival of the disease, especially in poorer areas of the country. Anti-leprosy projects have been integrated into a "multi-purpose health program," depriving them of funds specifically promised for fighting leprosy. Though the new government five-year plan earmarks funds to combat leprosy, the budget shortfall is more than 7 million rupees (US$325,000). Pakistan is on the threshold of achieving a leprosy-free society, the goal is being stifled because of financial constraints.

Though leprosy therapy in use since 1983 is effective, it is expensive and requires patients to receive weekly doses of medicine no longer widely available. The situation is particularly acute in mountainous regions and distant villages with limited access to medicine and doctors. More than 70 relief centers operate in Pakistan. New centers are opening in the North West Frontier Province and Baluchistan, where a large influx of Afghan refugees has brought many patients with leprosy.

Sister Pfau said that if necessary funds and essential facilities are provided, most leprosy patients will eventually be cured.

The centre also helped Hermanegild Marcos Antonio Drago start a leprosy center in a room of his clinic in Mirpur Khas for patients who would otherwise need to travel to Karachi for treatment. This has evolved into the Marie Adelaide Drago government leprosy clinic which treats hundreds of patients each year.

In 2003, there are an estimated 20,000 leprosy cases still in Pakistan and 12,000 people already disabled remain in need of care.

In 2010 the Marie Adelaide Leprosy Centre building has grown to eight storeys. Dr. Pfau is being hailed as Pakistan's 'Mother Teresa'.
