= Gora Qabaristan, Karachi =

Christian cemetery in Pakistan

Gora Qabaristan
- گورا قبارستان
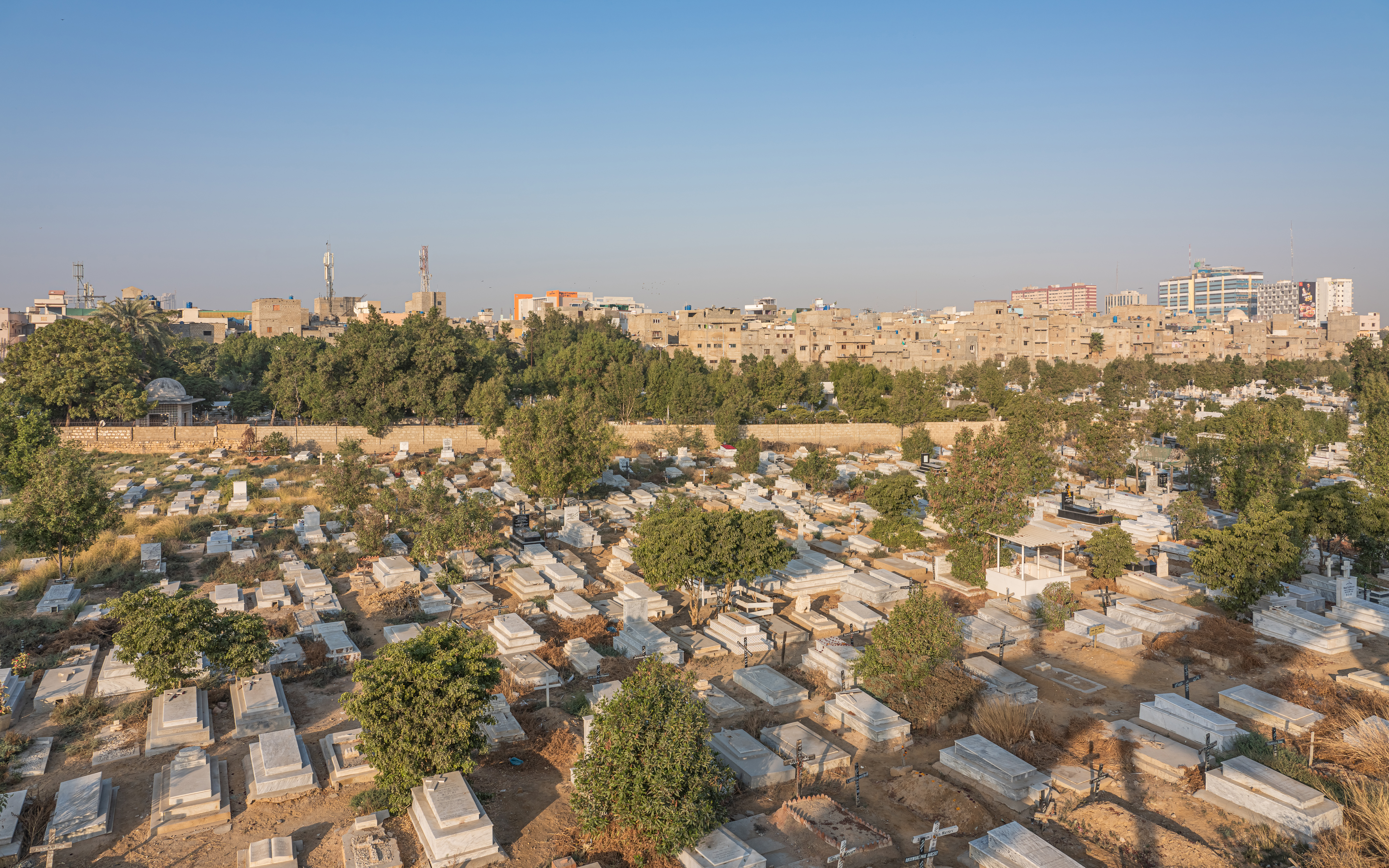
- Aerial Overview of Gora Qabaristan
- Interactive map of Gora Qabaristan

Details
- Location: Karachi Cantonment
- Country: Pakistan
- Coordinates: 24.8556°N 67.0499°E

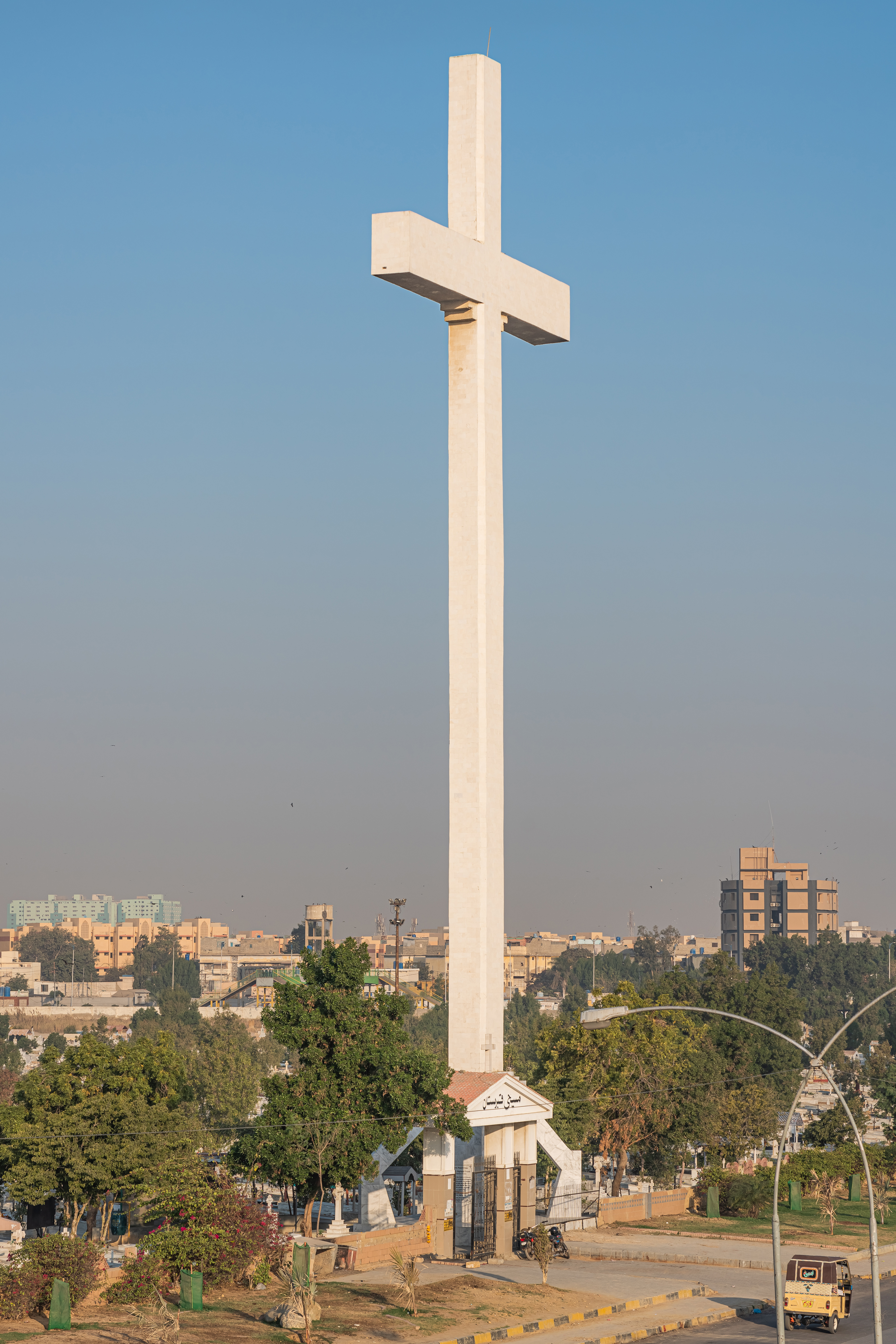
The cross at the entrance gate

The Gora Qabaristan (Urdu: گورا قبرِستان; also spelled as Gora Kabristan), or Gora Cemetery, literally transliterated as White (man's) graveyard is Karachi, Pakistan's only operational Christian cemetery.

== History ==
The original consecration of the Karachi Christian Cemetery was in 1845 during colonial rule but there is a tombstone set in the wall near the main gate of the cemetery bearing the date 1843.

The graveyard covers an area of around 20 acres.

After the independence in 1947, the British High Commission in Karachi invited the members of the various Christian bodies to form the Karachi Christian Cemeteries Board.

Its official name is 'Maseehi Qabraistan' (meaning Christian Cemetery). There is some evidence that an even older Christian cemetery existed on Muhammad Ali Jinnah Road near an area known as Eidgah. Having fallen into disuse it has since been built over with commercial establishments.

In May 2002, the mutilated body of American journalist Daniel Pearl was found in the graveyard. No one knows how it was dumped there.

In 2016 it was reported that 300,000 bodies were registered to be buried here. However, there is space for only 3,000 graves, which means each grave has been used one hundred times over its history.

== Location ==
It is located on main Shahrah-e-Faisal.

== Division ==
Until around 1981, the cemetery was divided into two parts, Protestant and Catholic. However, since then, the wall separating them was removed and the two merged.

== Management ==
The Karachi Christian Cemetery Board manages its affairs.

Over time the condition of the cemetery has deteriorated. In 1995, a group called CARE (Caring, putting into Action, and Restoring the Environmental degradation of the cemetery), made up of people from all parishes and churches, made it their objective to make the cemetery a clean and peaceful resting place for the departed.

Among the problems identified requiring attention were: stopping the continuous flow of sewage into the cemetery grounds; the cutting and clearing of weeds almost 8 feet high, removal of garbage piled up at least 3 feet high over an area of almost 2000 square yards along the West wall; the construction of a concrete wall (estimated to be 6,000 feet), and a permanent pumping station to drain out rain water during the monsoons.

In 2006 the cemetery continues to be desecrated with boys of the surrounding localities playing cricket and football here causing damage to the graves.

== Burial services ==
From 1885, burial services have been performed by a family firm, Anthony Coutinho and Company. The office still exists on Shahrah-e-Iraq, near St. Patrick's Cathedral, but it has all but stopped functioning. More recently, the St. Joseph's Association, a diocesan organization that organises burials has taken over this function.

== Polish memorial ==
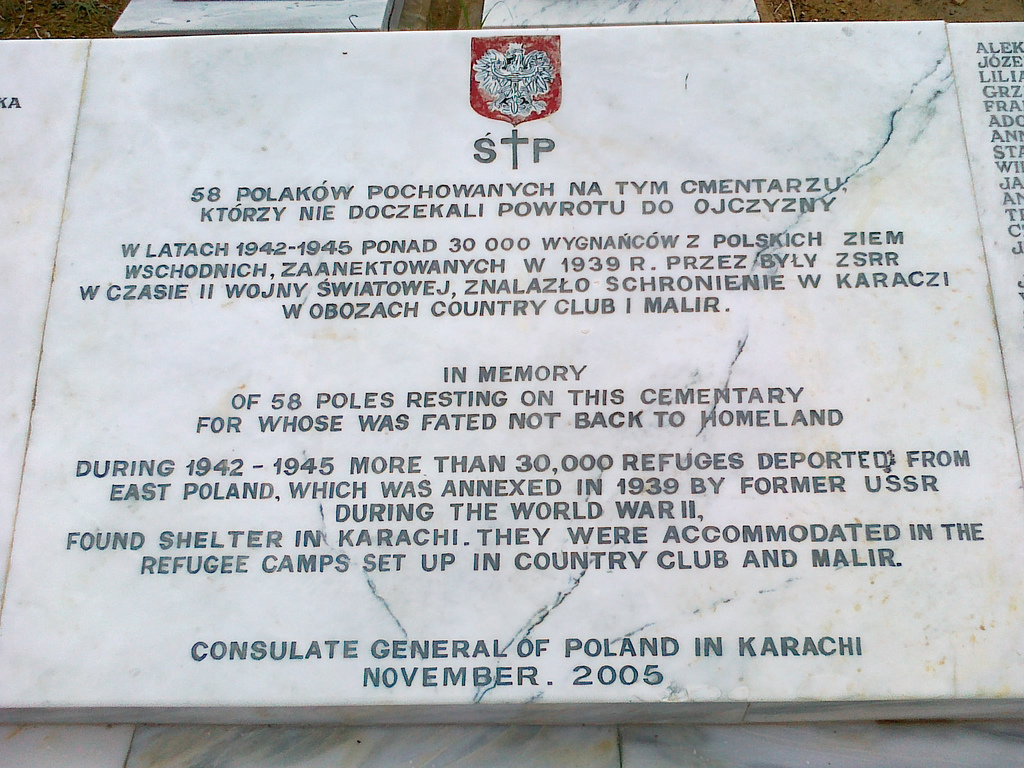
During 1939–1941, hundreds of thousands of Poles were deported to labor camps by the Soviet Union. Between 1942 and 1945, nearly 3,000 were given refuge in Karachi (then under British rule). This photo shows a memorial to the refugees who died in Karachi and were buried at the Karachi graveyard.

Following the Soviet invasion of Poland, hundreds of thousands of Poles were deported to Soviet labor camps. Between 1942 and 1945 some 3,000 refugees were given refuge in Karachi. In memory of the 58 Polish citizens who died in Karachi in the 1940s, a memorial has been erected by the Polish government. It lists the names of all 58 individuals.

The most prominent Pole buried in the cemetery is Air Commodore Władysław Turowicz who played a key role in Pakistan's aviation and aerospace industry.

== Renovations ==
The city's district government in 2011 installed two new gates and paved the pathways inside the graveyard.

In 2014 a giant cross, said to be one of the highest in the region – about 43m, has been constructed just inside the cemetery wall. The construction of the cross has been paid for by a Christian businessman, Parvez Henry Gill.
