= Technische Hochschule Leuna-Merseburg =

Former institution of higher education in Merseburg

Technische Hochschule „Carl Schorlemmer“ Leuna-Merseburg, abbreviated: THLM was an institution of tertiary education in the city of Merseburg in today's Saxony-Anhalt, Germany. It was founded on 1 September 1954 as Technische Hochschule für Chemie Leuna-Merseburg (THC) and closed on 31 March 1993. Hochschule Merseburg was founded on the grounds of THLM in 1992.

== History ==
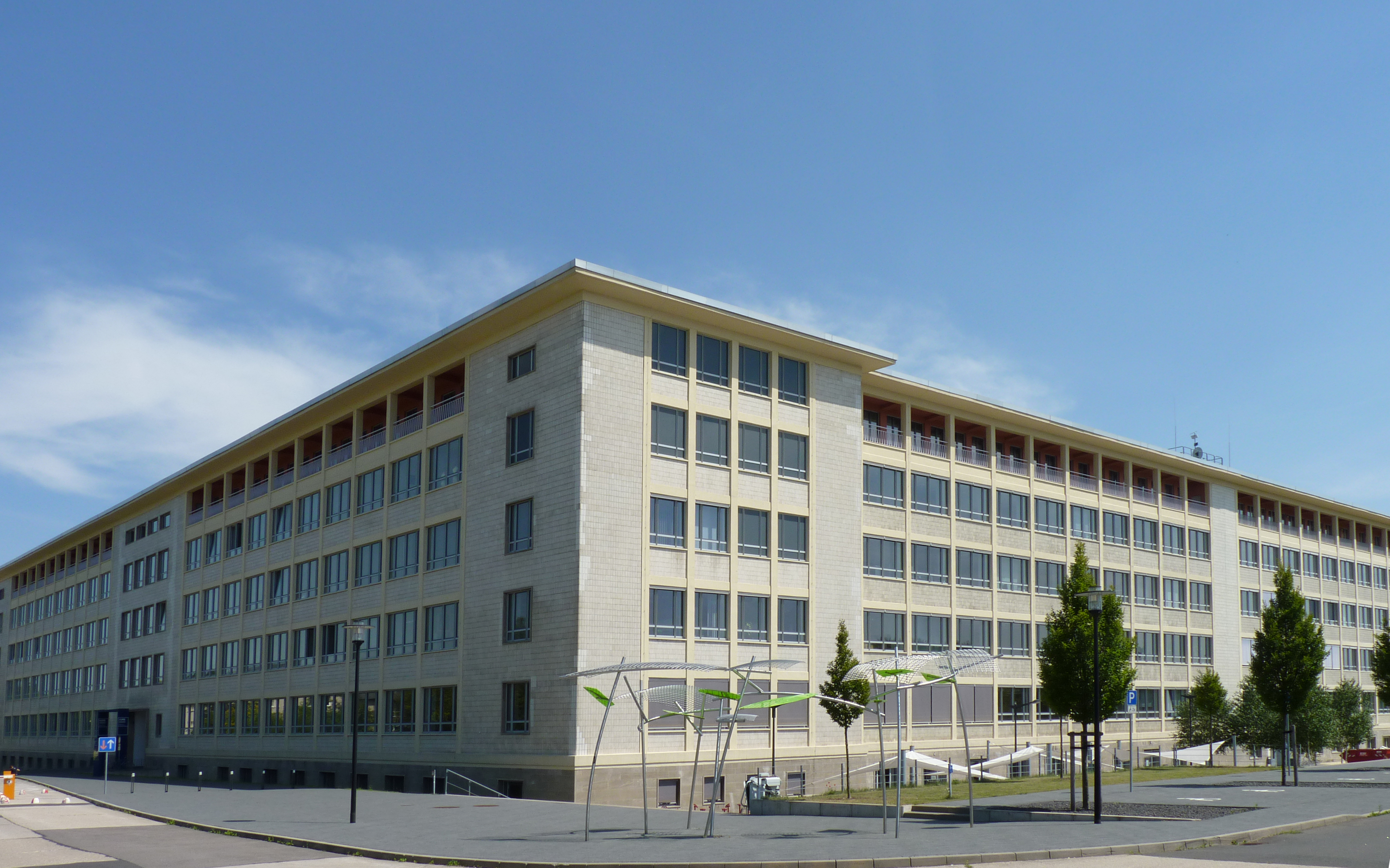
Main building of TH Leuna-Merseburg which housed the departments of chemistry and Marxism–Leninism, the main library, and lecture halls. Now used by Hochschule Merseburg.

Technische Hochschule für Chemie Leuna-Merseburg was founded in a ceremony held in Halle (Saale) on 1 September 1954. The first 207 students were registered on 19 October 1954 in the club house of Leuna chemical works, the mathematician Herbert Dallmann (1909–1996) was appointed as the first rector on this occasion, and the foundation stone of the Merseburg campus was laid. Despite the name of the new institution, it never had any facilities in Leuna; the name only referred to the largest chemical plant in the GDR.

The institution was founded with the aim of creating a Technische Hochschule (TH) that offered an application-oriented education in chemistry-related sciences and technology and supported the chemical industry in Central Germany. It can be regarded as a late consequence of the World Wars in the 20th century, and of the economical and political situation of the GDR that required an accelerated development of the industry. Several other institutions of tertiary education were founded at the same time.

Originally intended to be located in Leipzig, the new TH was finally established in the smaller and quieter city of Merseburg, situated between two major chemical plants (Leunawerke with ca. 30000 employees and Buna Werke Schkopau with ca. 20000 employees). It was originally attached to the Ministry of Heavy Industries, in December 1955 it was transferred to the newly founded Ministry of Chemical Industry and finally in February 1958 to the State Secretariat and later Ministry of Higher and Technical Education.

Year	Students	Dormitory places	Professors	Scientific staff members	Institutes
1954	207				
1959	947	774	35	115	18
1964	1940		39	211	25
1969	2670		55	347	
1974	2950	4009	55	347	
1979	2720	4009	72	437	
1984	3114	3690	79	386	
1989	2848		76	432	
1991	1854	3579	71	398	30

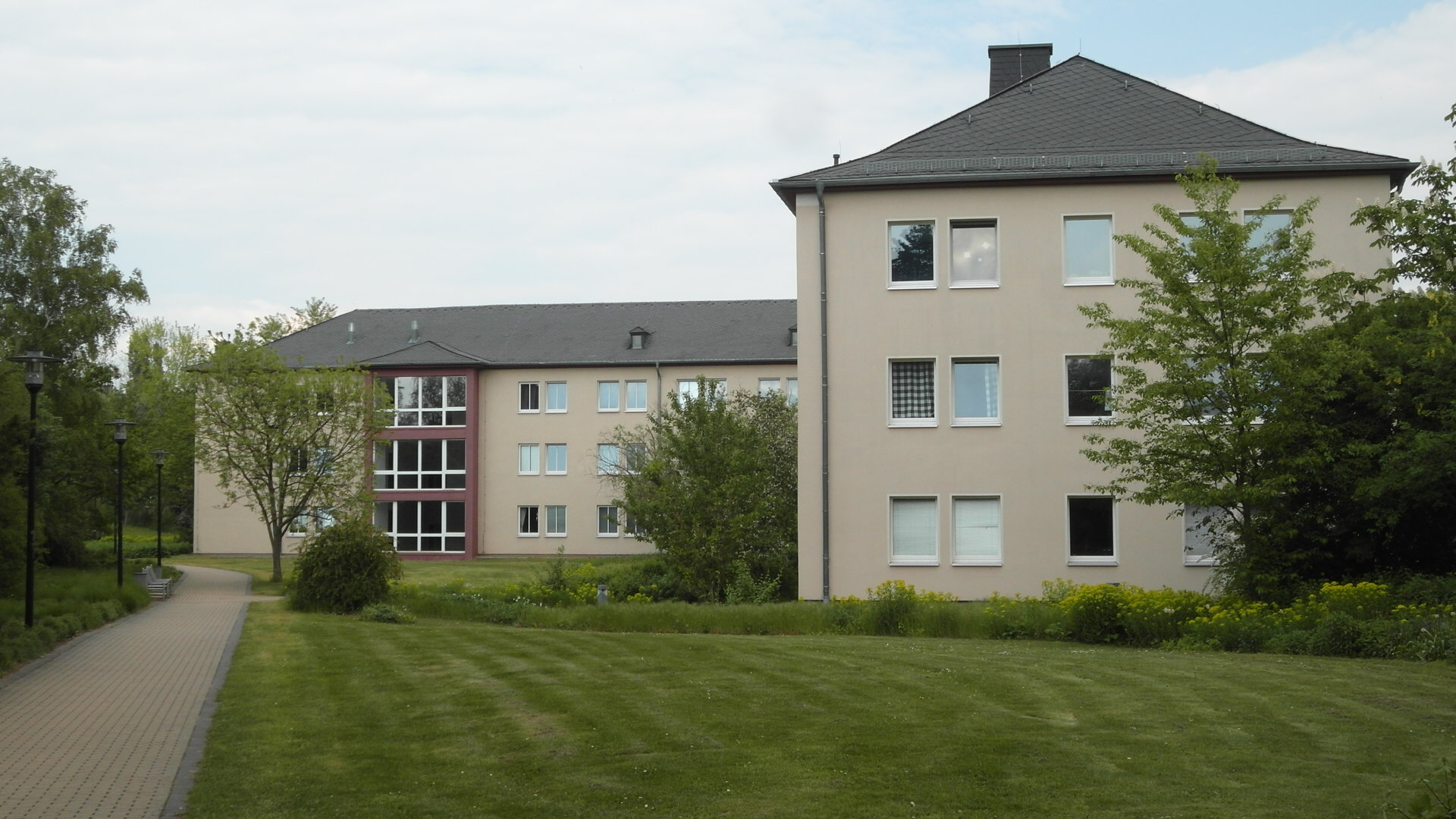
Students' dormitories on the campus (2014)

Students' accommodation was provided in dormitories on the campus or in a short distance thereof. Dormitory places not used by THLM students were used for students of the associated specialist Abitur classes or the Industrieinstitut (which prepared industry workers without Abitur for studies at university level) and also for younger staff members.

A festival week was held every five years following the foundation of the THLM. On occasion of its tenth anniversary it was awarded the new name Technische Hochschule für Chemie „Carl Schorlemmer“ Leuna-Merseburg by the Council of Ministers of the GDR, from 1975 on the name was shortened to Technische Hochschule „Carl Schorlemmer“ Leuna-Merseburg.

The library of THLM was the first in the new states of Germany after German Reunification that joined the data network Deutsches Wissenschaftsnetz founded in May 1990. In November 1990 THLM became a member of German Rectors' Conference. The government of Saxony-Anhalt decided in December 1990 to liquidate the institution. The result of an evaluation by the German Council of Science and Humanities in March 1991 was published in June. According to it, the departments of chemistry, process engineering and materials and processing technology were found to perform efficiently and competitively, and should join Martin Luther University of Halle-Wittenberg (MLU). Integration was completed in 1993, when the employees of THLM became employees of MLU. Closure of THLM was legally stipulated on 28 February 1992 and juridically completed on 31 March 1993. Incidentally, the last rector, Alfred Göpfert, who had only assumed the office on 14 December 1992, was also a mathematician.

== Rectors ==
- Herbert Dallmann (1909–1996), mathematician, 1954 - 1955
- Eberhard Leibnitz (1910–1986), chemist, 1955 - 1958
- Heinz Schmellenmeier (1909–1994), physicist, 1958 - 1961
- Elmar Profft (1905–1978), chemist, March 1961 - December 1961
- Rolf Landsberg (1920–2003), chemist, 1962 - 1964
- Hans-Joachim Bittrich (1923–2010), chemist, 1964 - 1968
- Hans-Heinz Emons (born 1930), chemist, 1968 - 1975
- Gert Naue (born 1934), engineer in fluid mechanics, 1975 - 1981
- Margit T. Rätzsch (born 1934), physical chemist, 1981 - 1989
- Egon Fanghänel (born 1935), chemist, 1990 - 1992
- Alfred Göpfert (born 1934), mathematician, 1992 - 1993

== Structure ==
=== Faculties and institutes ===
Originally, THC was organised into faculties.

After the academic senate had constituted itself in December 1955, Faculty II for Sciences and Supplementary Technological Subjects was founded. It was the predecessor of the later Faculty for Process Engineering and Fundamental Sciences which was formed in September 1958 and was awarded full promotion and habilitation rights in August 1959.

The Faculty for Material Sciences was formed in July 1956 and awarded full promotion and habilitation rights in November 1957. The first doctorate was awarded to Hans-Jürgen Papenfuß in January 1958, the first honorary doctorate in November 1958 to H. H. Franck.

The Faculty for Engineering Economics was also formed in 1956 and was awarded full promotion and habilitation rights in April 1961.

The faculties were subdivided into institutes. Among them were (in order of their opening):

- 1954: Institute of Anorganic Chemistry; Institute of Mathematics; Division of Social Sciences; university library (initially with 3000 books)
- 1955: Institute of Organic Chemistry; Institute of Analytical Chemistry (the only one of its kind in the GDR); Institute of Physical Chemistry; Division of Language Education; Division of Studentical Sports
- 1956: Institute of Technical Physics; Institute of Political Economy; Institute of Organisation and Planning of Chemical Plants; Institute of Normatives and Standardisation; Institute of Accountancy and Finances; Industrial Institute
- 1958: Institute of Chemistry and Technology of Polymers
- 1959: Institute of Chemistry and Technology of Mineral Salts; Institute of Petroleum Chemistry; Institute of Chemical Metals; Institute of Marxism–Leninism; Institute of Material Sciences and Mechanical Technologies
- 1960: Institute of Economy of the Chemical Industry; Institute of Process Engineering
- 1962: Institute of Chemistry and Technology of Fundamental and Intermediate Organic Chemical Products
- 1964: Institute of Mechanical Process Engineering, Apparatus Technology and Project Designing; the Institute of Technical Physics was divided into the Institute of Automatisation of Chemical Processes and the Institute of Technical Mechanics and Fluid Mechanics
- 1967: Institute of Socialist Economic Management; the Institute of Petroleum Chemistry and Organic Intermediates was formed from the Institutes of Petroleum Chemistry and of Chemistry and Technology of Fundamental and Intermediate Organic Chemical Products; the Institute of Anorganic and Technical Chemistry was formed from the Institutes of Chemical Metals and of Chemistry and Technology of Mineral Salts

The research department of the pharmaceutical works Fahlberg-List in Magdeburg was attached to THC as Forschungsinstitut Magdeburg in 1955.

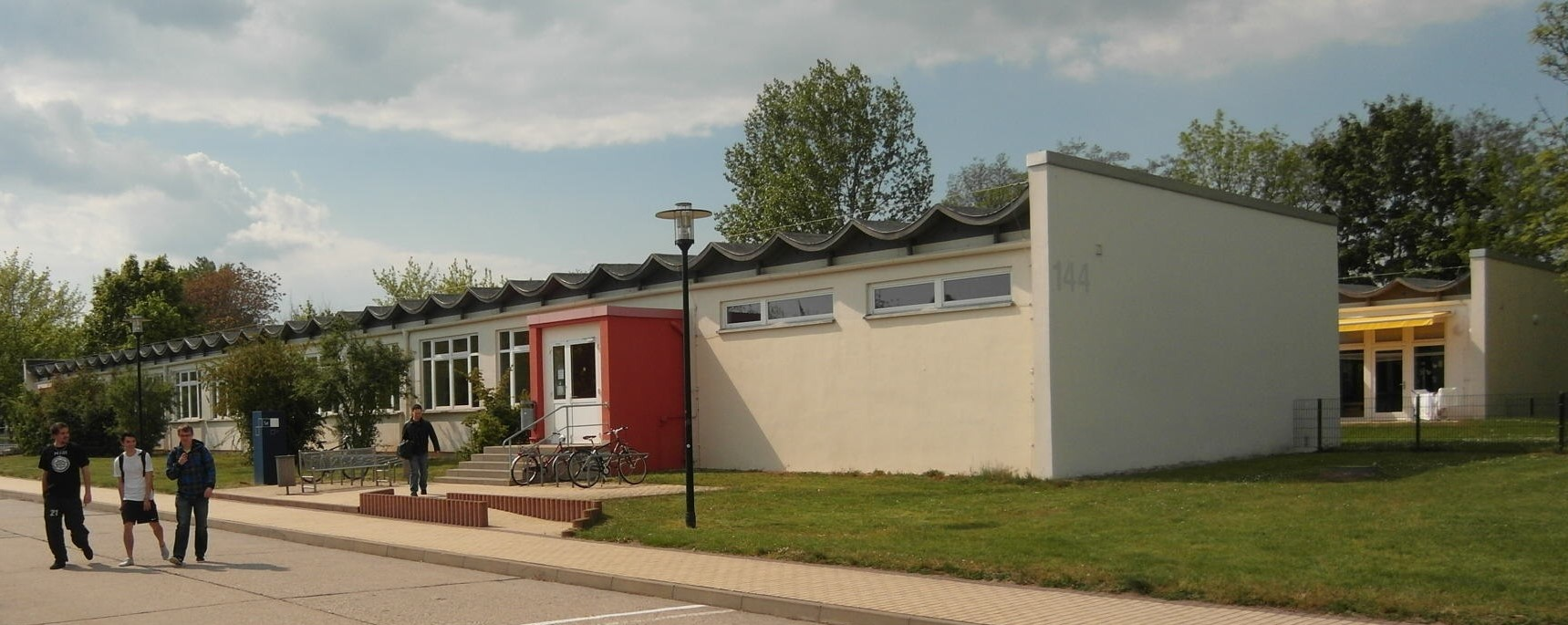
Building of former Specialist Classes for Chemistry

=== Specialist classes for chemistry ===
THC was the first institution of tertiary education in the GDR to establish specialist Abitur classes in 1964, with a specialist focus on chemistry. There, students who had passed an entrance exam were accepted after finishing the ten-year secondary school, and received specialist instruction in the sciences, in particular in chemistry, on top of the ordinary extended secondary school curriculum. They were already integrated into the university structures, attended lectures and seminars and practical classes in the laboratory, and were to a large extent educated by university teachers.

=== Restructuring ===
The university reforms of the late 1960s in the GDR caused changes in the organisational structure towards greater centralisation. Institutes were transformed into sub-departments (Wissenschaftsbereich) and grouped into sections (Sektion) (comparable to departments). The following sections were formed:

- Chemistry
- Process Chemistry
- Process Engineering
- Polymer Sciences (Hochpolymere)
- Socialist Economic Management (SBW)
- Cybernetics/Mathematics/Data Processing (KMD)

New sections were formed in 1972 from the latter two:

- Economics
- Mathematics and Computing Technology

In 1976, the Sections of Process Chemistry and of Polymer Sciences were dissolved and partly attached to the Section of Chemistry. At the same time two new sections were formed:

- Physics
- Materials Sciences

There existed also a Section of Marxism–Leninism which had no students of its own, but provided the then obligatory education in Marxism–Leninism for the students of all other sections.

After the German reunification, the faculty structure was reintroduced. In 1991, the following faculties existed:

- Faculty of Sciences
  - Department of Chemistry
    - Institute of Analytical and Environmental Chemistry
    - Institute of Anorganic Chemistry
    - Institute of Organic Chemistry
    - Institute of Physical Chemistry
    - Institute of Technical Chemistry
    - Institute of Macromolecular Chemistry
  - Department of Physics
    - Institute of Theoretical Physica
    - Institute of Experimental Physics
    - Institute of Applied Physics
- Faculty of Technological Sciences and Mathematics
  - Department of Mathematics and Infoematics
    - Institute of Analysis
    - Institute of Applied Mathematics
    - Institute of Informatics
    - Computer centre
  - Department of Process Engineering
    - Institute of Technical Fluid Mechanics
    - Institute of Fundamentals of Process Engineering
    - Institute of Thermal Process Engineering
    - Institute of Mechanical Process Engineering
    - Institute of Reaction Technology
    - Institute of System Process Engineering
    - Institute of Technical Thermodynamics and Energy Management
    - Institute of Automatisation and Electrical Engineering
    - Institute of Technology of Environmental Protection
    - Institute of Biotechnology
  - Department of Materials and Processing Technology
    - Institute of Plastics and Rubber Technology
    - Institute of Processing Technology and Rheology
    - Institute of Materials Technology
    - Institute of Technical Mechanics
- Faculty of Economic and Social Sciences
  - Department of Economy
    - Institute of Business Management
    - Institute of Interdisciplinary Technological Research
    - Institute of Foreign Languages

== Literature ==
- Dietrich Werner, D. Herrmann: msr stellt vor: Technische Hochschule „Carl Schorlemmer“ Leuna-Merseburg – Sektion Verfahrenstechnik, Wissenschaftsbereich Automatisierungstechnik. In: messen, steuern, regeln, Berlin. vol. 27, no. 5, 1984, pp. 231–235.
- German Council of Science and Humanities: Empfehlungen zur künftigen Struktur der Hochschullandschaft in den neuen Ländern und im Ostteil von Berlin. Teil I bis IV. Köln 1992.
- Klaus Krug, Hans-Joachim Hörig, Dieter Schnurpfeil (editors): 50 Jahre Hochschule in Merseburg. Merseburger Beiträge zur Geschichte der chemischen Industrie Mitteldeutschlands, published by Förderverein Sachzeugen der chemischen Industrie e. V., Merseburg, vol. 9, no. 1, 2004.
- "Emeriti und Ruheständler". Martin-Luther-Universität Halle-Wittenberg. List of emeriti and retired university teachers including those who had worked at THLM before joining MLU
