= Władysław Turowicz =

Pakistani-Polish Aviator (1908–1980)

Władysław Józef Marian Turowicz SPk SI(M) TPk SK SQA
- Turowicz's photo at Monument of Air Cdre Władysław Turowicz in Karachi
- Born: 23 April 1908; Wadziejewsko, Siberia, Russian Empire
- Died: 8 January 1980 (aged 71); Karachi, Pakistan
- Education: Warsaw Polytechnic, Poland
- Known for: Pakistan's Space Program; Pakistan Air Force pioneer Missile and Rocket Technology
- Awards: Sitara-e-Imtiaz; Sitara-e-Pakistan; Sitara-e-Quaid-e-Azam; Tamgha-e-Pakistan; Order of Merit of Poland; Cross of Merit of Poland; Sitara-e-Pakistan (1965); Tamgha-i-Pakistan (1967); Sitara-i-Khidmat (1967); Sitara-e-Quaid-e-Azam (1971); Sitara-i-Imtiaz (Mil) (1972); Abdus Salam Award in Aeronautical Engineering (1978); ICTP Award in Space Physics (1979)
- Scientific career
- Fields: Aeronautical Engineering
- Workplaces: Polish Air Force Academy; Royal Air Force College Cranwell; Pakistan Air Force Academy; Space and Upper Atmosphere Research Commission
- Doctoral advisor: Dr. Antoni Kocjan
- Notable students: Abdul Majid (physicist)

Władysław Józef Marian Turowicz SPk SI(M) TPk SK SQA (Urdu: ولادیسلاو جوزف مارئین تورووچ, romanized: Vladislav Joseph Torovich; Polish pronunciation: [vwaˈdɨs.waf ˈju.zɛf ˈma.rjan tuˈrɔ.vit͡ʂ] 23 April 1908 – 8 January 1980), usually referred to as W. J. M. Turowicz, was a Polish-Pakistani aviator, military scientist and aeronautical engineer.

He was one of 45 Polish officers and airmen who joined RPAF on contract in the early 1950s. After completion of his initial contract, Turowicz opted to stay on in Pakistan and continued to serve in the Pakistan Air Force. Turowicz was the administrator of Pakistan's Space and Upper Atmosphere Research Commission (SUPARCO), which leads the national space programme, from 1967 to 1970.

Turowicz made significant contributions to Pakistan's missile/rocket program as a chief aeronautical engineer. In Pakistan, he remains highly respected as a scientist and noted aeronautical engineer.

== Early life and education ==
Turowicz was born to an aristocratic family in the village of Wadziejewsko in Siberia (Russia) in 1908, where he graduated from high school. The Polish name of the village may suggest it was inhabited by Poles who were exiled or imprisoned by the Tsar, as it was unusual for Polish aristocrats to live in Siberia for non-political reasons.

From an early age on, Turowicz was fascinated by aviation technology and had collected different models of aircraft. Due to this passion, he moved to Warsaw where he attended the most prestigious engineering institute, the Warsaw University of Technology (WTU) in 1930, majoring in aeronautical engineering; upon graduation, he received his PhD with honours in 1936. He completed an MSc in astrodynamics in 1937 from the same institution.

While at Warsaw University of Technology, Turowicz joined and became a pioneering member of a Aeroklub Polski (better known as Polish Aero Club) where he worked and studied with noted Polish engineers to the field of aerospace engineering. As a member of Polski Club, he had an opportunity to study and work with Ryszard Bartel, Jerzy Drzewiecki and Henry Millicer, amongst others. It was at the Aero Club that Turowicz met his future wife, Zofia Turowicz with whom he would have 4 children. He completed an MSc in astrodynamics in 1937 from the same institution.

== World War II and RAF career ==
Though initially joining the Polish Air Force, Turowicz enlisted as a Royal Air Force reservist during World War II.

Władysław Józef Marian Turowicz
- Nickname: Air Cdre Wlady
- Allegiance: Poland, United Kingdom, Pakistan
- Branch: Polish Air Force (1927–1939); Royal Air Force (1939–1947); Pakistan Air Force (1947–1980)
- Service years: 1927–1980
- Rank: Air Commodore
- Conflicts: World War II
- Other work: Administrator at SUPARCO

== Documentary ==
A documentary film on the life and scientific work of Air Cdre Władysław Turowicz was completed in 2008. It was directed by Anna T. Pietraszek, a Polish journalist and filmmaker with an honorary Pakistani citizenship. The film shows how Air Cdre Turowicz and other Polish officers and technicians had contributed in building the PAF soon after independence.

== Honours and recognition ==
- Władysław Turowicz Monument (PAF Museum, Karachi).
- Władysław Turowicz Space Complex (SUPARCO), Lahore Center.

== Awards and decorations ==
- Sitara-e-Pakistan (1965)
- Tamgha-i-Pakistan (1967)
- Sitara-i-Khidmat (1967)
- Sitara-e-Quaid-e-Azam (1971)
- Sitara-e-Imtiaz, (Mil) (1972)
- Abdus Salam Award in Aeronautical Engineering (1978)
- ICTP Award in Space Physics (1979)

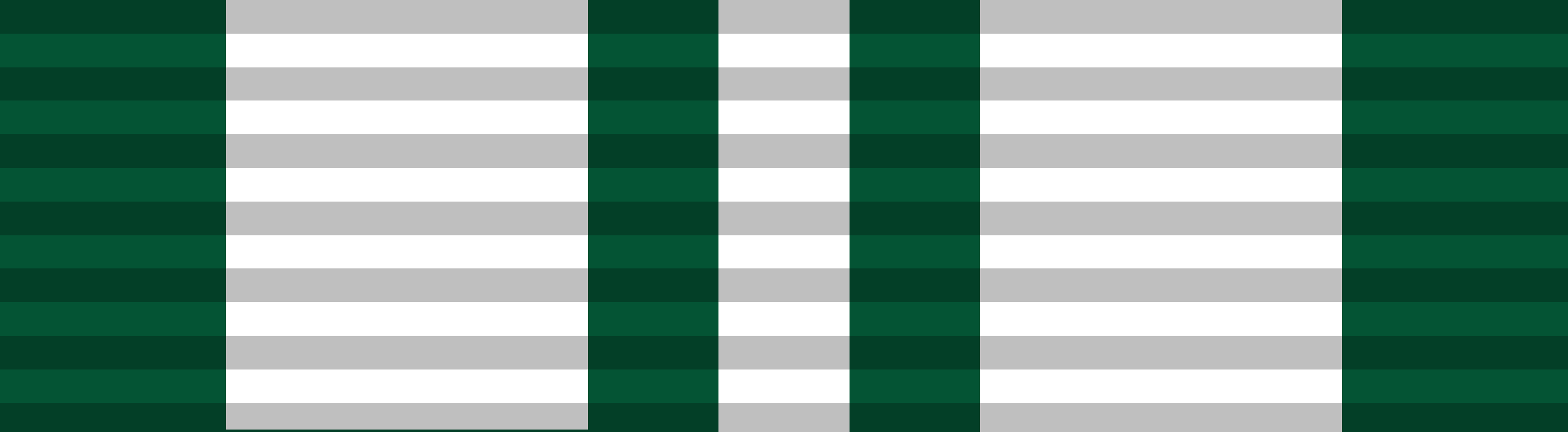

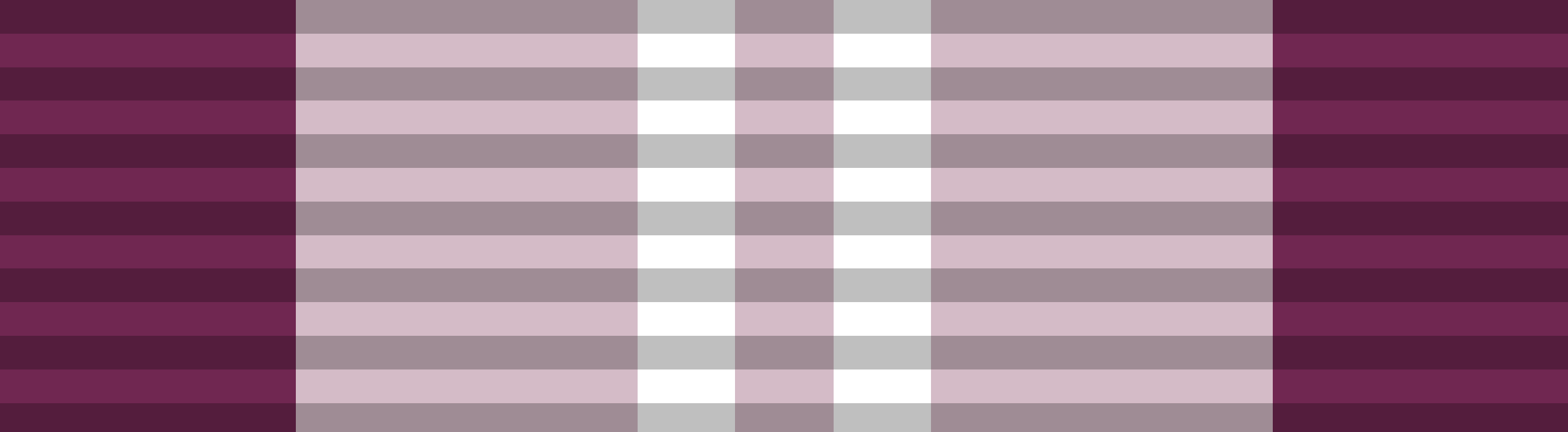

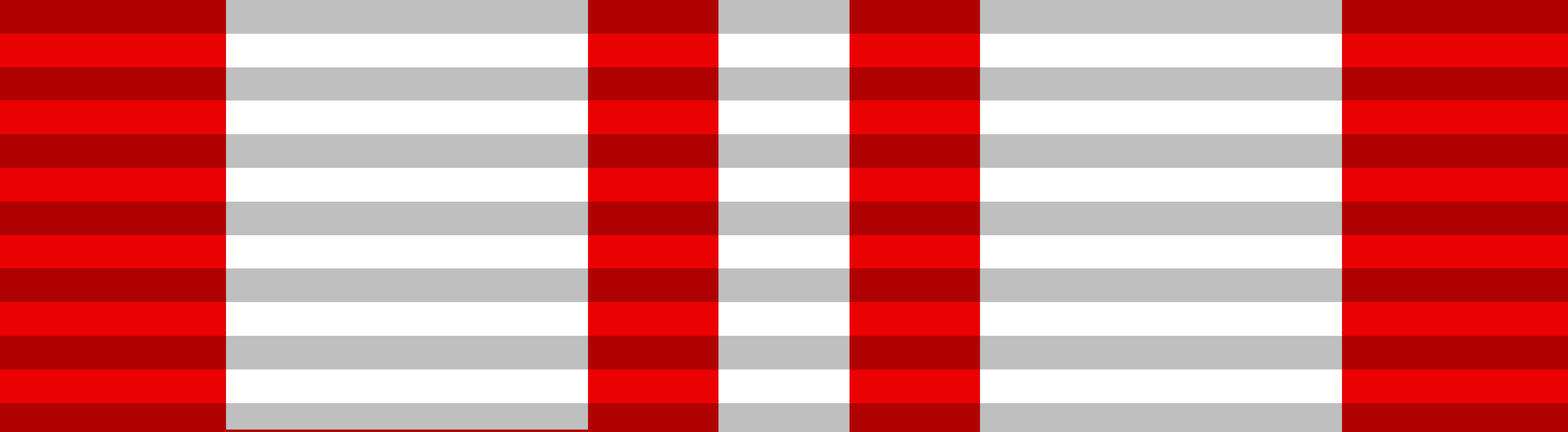

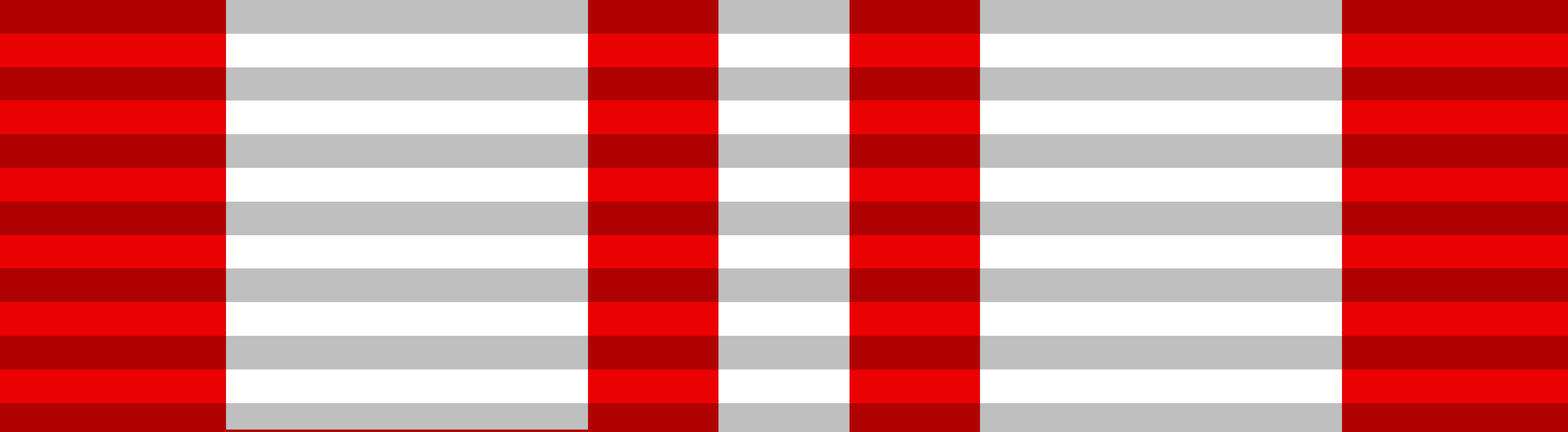

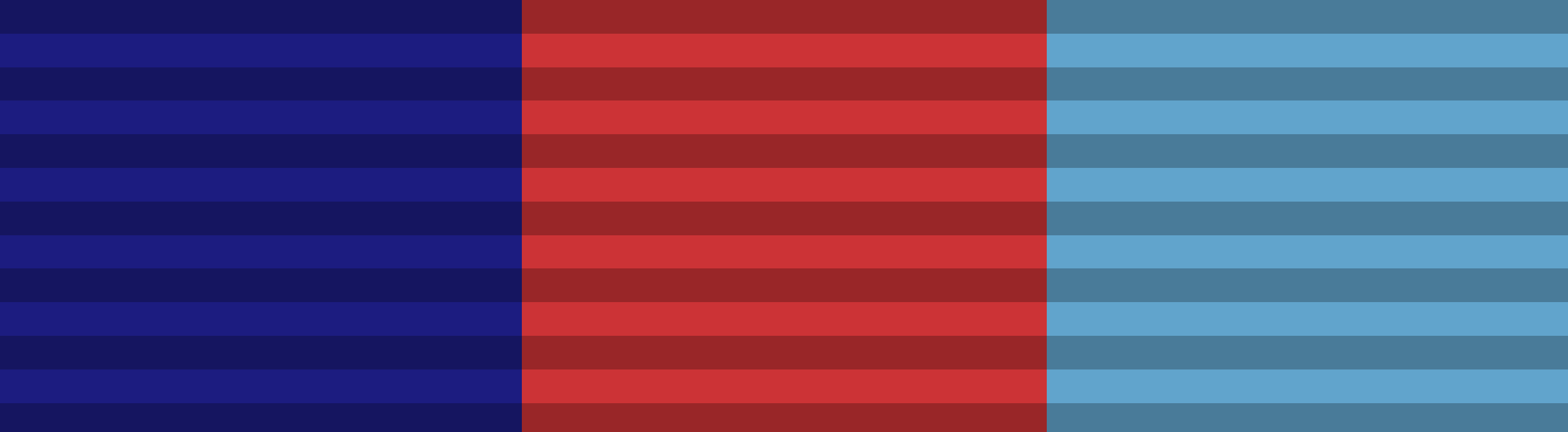

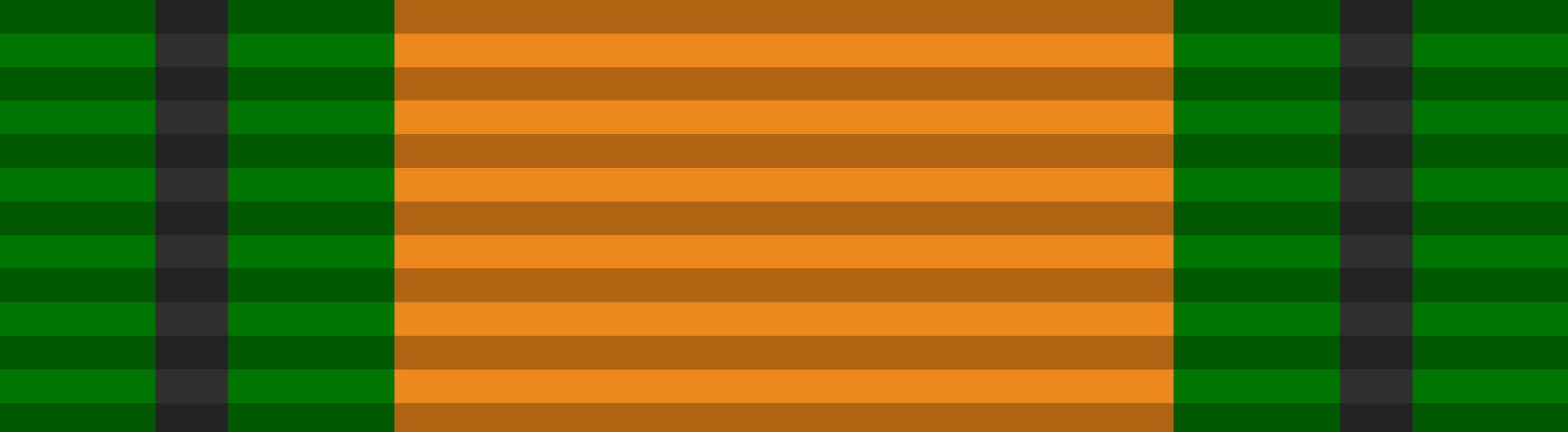

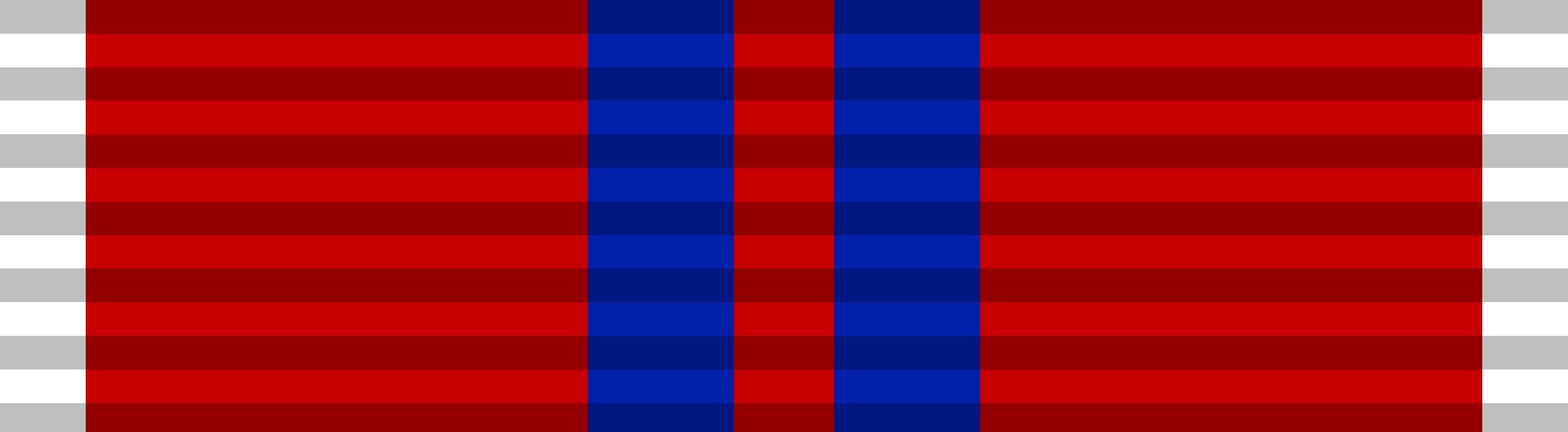

| | Sitara-e-Imtiaz (SI) | | |
| Sitara-e-Pakistan (SPk) | Sitara-e-Quaid-e-Azam (SQA) | Sitara-e-Khidmat (SK) | Sitara-e-Khidmat (SK) |
| Tamgha-e-Jang 1965 War (War Medal 1965) | Tamgha-e-Jamhuria (Republic Commemoration Medal) 1956 | 1939-1945 Star | Defence Medal |
| War Medal 1939-1945 | Queen Elizabeth II Coronation Medal (1953) | Order of Merit Of Poland (Poland) | Cross of Merit with Silver Swords (Poland) |

=== Foreign decorations ===
Foreign Awards
| UK | 1939-1945 Star |
| UK | Defence Medal |
| UK | War Medal 1939-1945 |
| UK | Queen Elizabeth II Coronation Medal |
| Netherlands | Order of the Orange Nassau |
| Lebanon | National Order of the Cedar |

== See also ==
- Space and Upper Atmosphere Research Commission
- Sonmiani Satellite Launch Center
- Polish Air Force
- Pakistan Air Force
- Abdul Majid (physicist)
- Abdus Salam
- Polish people in Pakistan
