= Fazaia Ruth Pfau Medical College =

Medical College in Karachi, Pakistan

Coordinates: 24.8894204°N 67.1162611°E

- FRPMC
- Former names: Fazaia Ruth Pfau Medical College, Karachi
- Type: Private college
- Established: 2019
- Affiliations: Higher Education Commission of Pakistan; Air University, Islamabad
- Principal: Dr. Masood Ahmed
- Students: 500
- Location: Karachi, Sindh, Pakistan
- Website: frpmc.edu.pk
- [Hospitals] FRPMC is affiliated with PAF hospital Faisal and PAF hospital Masroor

The Fazaia Ruth Pfau Medical College (FRPMC) is a Private medical College which is located in PAF Base Faisal, Shahrah-e-Faisal, Karachi, Sindh, Pakistan. It is a constituent college of Air University, Islamabad of Pakistan Air Force.

== History ==
Fazaia Ruth Pfau Medical College (named after the German-Pakistani Physician and nun), Karachi was established in February, 2019 as a constituent institution of Air University, Islamabad. Air University, Islamabad is a public University, chartered in 2002 under governance of Pakistan Air Force. Faculty of Medicine at Air University offers a medical program with modular curriculum using a spiral approach. A panel of medical education experts has designed this curriculum in alignment with Pakistan Medical Commission guidelines. Its parent university, Air University (Pakistan Air Force) is accredited by the Higher Education Commission of Pakistan.

== Faculty ==
The college has 3 main faculties:

- Faculty of Basic Science
- Faculty of Clinical Science
- Faculty of Medical Education
