= Kass =

Origin
- Languages: Czech, Estonian
- Meaning: Cat (in Estonian)
- Region of origin: Estonia

Other names
- Variant form: Katz

Kass is a surname. It originated in several different ways, including as a nickname in former eastern territories of Germany from the Czech word kos 'blackbird' or 'shrewd person', from the Estonian word kass 'cat', from the given name Gazo, as an Ashkenazi Jewish surname from the given name Casriel, and possibly as an Americanized spelling of Káš or Kaše. The 2010 United States census found 3,796 people with the surname Kass, making it the 8,655th-most-common surname in the country, compared to 3,523 people (8,599th-most-common) in the 2000 census. In both US censuses, more than nine-tenths of the bearers of the surname identified as non-Hispanic white.

People with the surname include:

- Alvin Kass (1935–2025), American rabbi
- Amalie Kass (1928–2019), American historian
- Amy Kass (1940–2015), American humanities scholar
- Carmen Kass (born 1978), Estonian model
- Danny Kass (born 1982), American snowboarder
- Dara Kass (born 1977), American emergency medicine physician
- David Kass (born 1970), American tennis player
- David Kass (physician), American cardiologist
- Deborah Kass (born 1952), American painter
- Edward H. Kass (1917–1990), American physician, professor and historian
- Henri Kass (1919–1982), Luxembourgish cyclist
- James R. Kass (fl. 1962–present), Canadian physicist
- János Kass (1927–2010), Hungarian illustrator
- Jerome Kass (1937–2015), American screenwriter and author
- Johannes Kass (born 1949), Estonian politician
- John Kass (born 1956), American journalist
- Kristiina Kass (born 1970), Estonian children's writer and illustrator
- Leon Kass (born 1939), American bioethicist
- Leonhard Kass (1911–1985), Estonian footballer
- Mallory Kass (born 1984), American author
- Michael Kass, American computer scientist
- Peter Kass (1923–2008), American acting teacher and director
- Pnina Moed Kass (born 1938), Belgian writer
- Ras Kass (born John Austin, 1973), American rapper
- Raye Kass (fl. 1970–present), Canadian social scientist
- Richard Kass, Scottish jazz drummer and educator
- Robert Kass (born 1952), American statistician
- Robin Kåss (born 1977), Norwegian medical doctor and politician
- Ron Kass (1935–1986), American businessman, recording executive, and film producer
- Sam Kass (born 1980), American chef

== See also ==
- Cass (surname)
- Kass, Swat, Pakistan
