= Sherwood Gorbach =

American academic (1934–2024)

Sherwood Leslie Gorbach (October 25, 1934 – December 7, 2024) was an American academic who was Emeritus Professor at Tufts University School of Medicine. He was editor-in-chief of the journal Clinical Infectious Diseases from 2000 to 2016.

== Education ==
Gorbach graduated from Brandeis University in 1955, and completed his MD at Tufts University School of Medicine in 1962.

== Lactobacillus rhamnosus GG ==
Lactobacillus rhamnosus GG (ATCC 53103) is a strain of Lactobacillus rhamnosus that was isolated in 1983 from the intestinal tract of a healthy human by Gorbach and Barry Goldin; the 'GG' derives from the first letters of their surnames.

== Death ==
Gorbach died on December 7, 2024, at the age of 90.

== Awards ==
Gorbach was awarded the Alexander Fleming Award for Lifetime Achievement from the Infectious Diseases Society of America in 2007.

== Selected publications ==
=== Articles ===
- D. G. Evans; R. P. Silver; D. J. Evans; D. G. Chase; S. L. Gorbach (1 September 1975). "Plasmid-controlled colonization factor associated with virulence in Esherichia coli enterotoxigenic for humans". Infection and Immunity. 12 (3): 656–667. doi:10.1128/IAI.12.3.656-667.1975. ISSN 0019-9567. PMC 415337. PMID 1100526. S2CID 37713987. Wikidata Q34127467.
- Goldin BR; Adlercreutz H; Sherwood Gorbach; Warram JH; Dwyer JT; Swenson L; Woods MN (1 December 1982). "Estrogen excretion patterns and plasma levels in vegetarian and omnivorous women". The New England Journal of Medicine. 307 (25): 1542–1547. doi:10.1056/NEJM198212163072502. ISSN 0028-4793. PMID 7144835. Wikidata Q70522350.
- G. L. Simon; S. L. Gorbach (1 January 1984). "Intestinal flora in health and disease". Gastroenterology. 86 (1): 174–193. doi:10.1016/0016-5085(84)90606-1. ISSN 0016-5085. PMID 6357937. Wikidata Q39464842.
- B R Goldin; Sherwood Gorbach (1 May 1984). "The effect of milk and lactobacillus feeding on human intestinal bacterial enzyme activity". The American Journal of Clinical Nutrition. 39 (5): 756–761. doi:10.1093/AJCN/39.5.756. ISSN 0002-9165. PMID 6424430. Wikidata Q70473463.
- P L Conway; Sherwood Gorbach; B R Goldin (January 1987). "Survival of lactic acid bacteria in the human stomach and adhesion to intestinal cells". Journal of Dairy Science. 70 (1): 1–12. doi:10.3168/JDS.S0022-0302(87)79974-3. ISSN 0022-0302. PMID 3106442. Wikidata Q28290485.
- M Silva; N V Jacobus; C Deneke; Sherwood Gorbach (August 1987). "Antimicrobial substance from a human Lactobacillus strain". Antimicrobial Agents and Chemotherapy. 31 (8): 1231–3. doi:10.1128/AAC.31.8.1231. ISSN 0066-4804. PMC 174909. PMID 3307619. Wikidata Q24676914.
- Meydani SN; Endres S; Woods MM; Goldin BR; Soo C; Morrill-Labrode A; Dinarello CA; Gorbach SL (1 April 1991). "Oral (n-3) fatty acid supplementation suppresses cytokine production and lymphocyte proliferation: comparison between young and older women". Journal of Nutrition. 121 (4): 547–555. doi:10.1093/JN/121.4.547. ISSN 0022-3166. PMID 2007907. Wikidata Q34093131.
- B R Goldin; Sherwood Gorbach; M Saxelin; S Barakat; L Gualtieri; S Salminen (1 January 1992). "Survival of Lactobacillus species (strain GG) in human gastrointestinal tract". Digestive Diseases and Sciences. 37 (1): 121–128. doi:10.1007/BF01308354. ISSN 0163-2116. PMID 1728516. S2CID 7178083. Wikidata Q46653370.
- Sherwood Gorbach (1 January 1993). "Treatment of intra-abdominal infections". Journal of Antimicrobial Chemotherapy. 31 Suppl A: 67–78. doi:10.1093/JAC/31.SUPPL_A.67. ISSN 0305-7453. PMID 8449835. Wikidata Q40884635.
- C. Herman; T. Adlercreutz; Barry R. Goldin; et al. (1 March 1995). "Soybean phytoestrogen intake and cancer risk". Journal of Nutrition. 125 (3 Suppl): 757S–770S. ISSN 0022-3166. PMID 7884562. Wikidata Q40609112.
- Sherwood Gorbach (1 January 2000). "Probiotics and gastrointestinal health". The American Journal of Gastroenterology. 95 (1 Suppl): S2-4. doi:10.1016/S0002-9270(99)00806-0. ISSN 0002-9270. PMID 10634218. Wikidata Q73351176.
- Dennis L Stevens; Alan L Bisno; Henry F Chambers; et al. (14 October 2005). "Practice guidelines for the diagnosis and management of skin and soft-tissue infections". Clinical Infectious Diseases. 41 (10): 1373–1406. doi:10.1086/497143. ISSN 1058-4838. PMID 16231249. Wikidata Q34460523.
- Shira Doron; Sherwood L Gorbach (1 April 2006). "Probiotics: their role in the treatment and prevention of disease". Expert Review of Anti-infective Therapy. 4 (2): 261–275. doi:10.1586/14787210.4.2.261. ISSN 1478-7210. PMID 16597207. S2CID 11325238. Wikidata Q36441502.
- Doron, S.; Gorbach, S. L. (2008). "Bacterial Infections: Overview". International Encyclopedia of Public Health. pp. 273–282. doi:10.1016/B978-012373960-5.00596-7. ISBN 9780123739605. PMC 7149789.
- Dennis L. Stevens; Alan L. Bisno; Henry F Chambers; et al. (18 June 2014). "Practice guidelines for the diagnosis and management of skin and soft tissue infections: 2014 update by the infectious diseases society of America" (PDF). Clinical Infectious Diseases. 59 (2): 147–159. doi:10.1093/CID/CIU296. ISSN 1058-4838. PMID 24947530. Wikidata Q34425750.

=== Books ===
- Gorbach, S. L. (1994). Intra-abdominal Infections: The Role of Piperacillin/Tazobactam. PharmaLibri. ISBN 9780919839205.
- Miller, T. L.; Gorbach, S. L. (1999). Nutritional Aspects of HIV Infection. Arnold.
- Baddour, L. M.; Gorbach, S. L., eds. (2003). Therapy of Infectious Diseases. Saunders. ISBN 9780721681450.
- Gorbach, S.; Mylonakis, E. (January 2003). Treatment Strategies in Infectious Diseases. Pocketmedicine.Com Incorporated. ISBN 9781931998345.
- Gorbach, S. L.; Bartlett, J. G.; Blacklow, N. R. (2004). Infectious Diseases (3rd ed.). Lippincott Williams & Wilkins. ISBN 9780781733717.
- Falagas, M. E.; Mylonakis, eds. (6 November 2012). Gorbach's 5-Minute Infectious Diseases Consult (2nd ed.). Lippincott Williams & Wilkins. ISBN 9781451154085.
- Wanke, C. L.; Gorbach, S. L., eds. (6 December 2012). Lipodystrophy Syndrome in HIV. Springer. ISBN 9781461504719.
