= Clifford Lane =

American physician-scientist

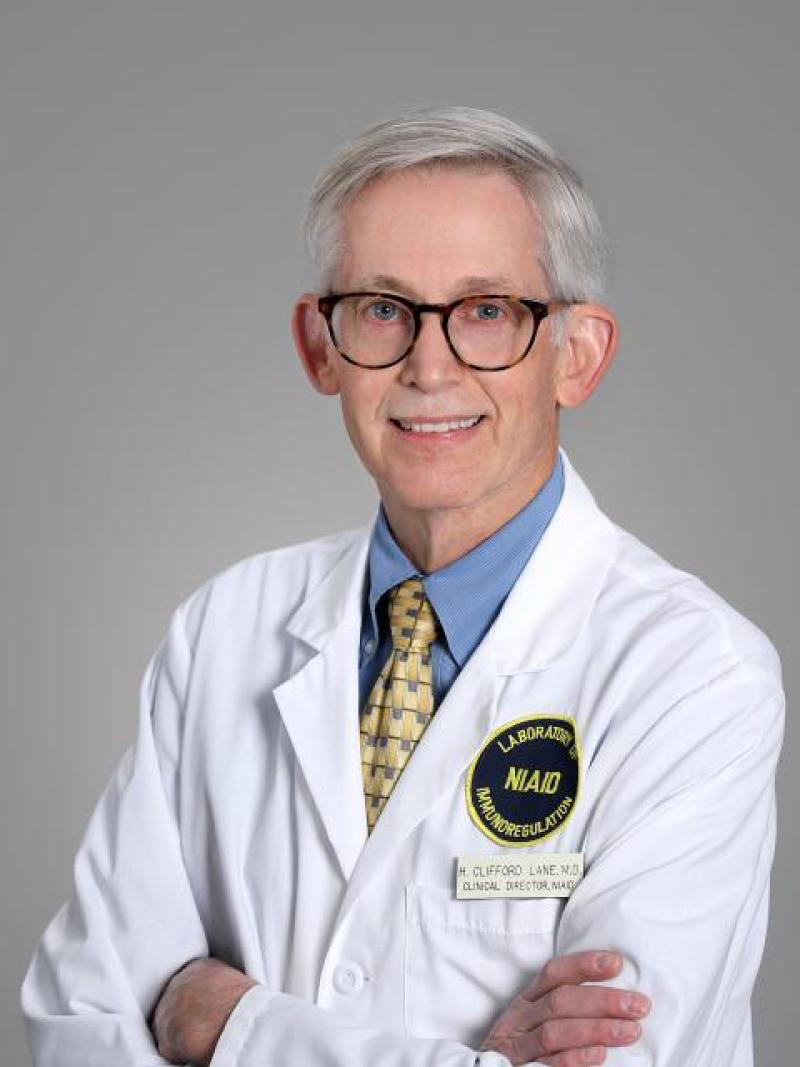
- Education: University of Michigan
- Scientific career
- Fields: Infectious diseases
- Workplaces: National Institutes of Health

H. Clifford Lane is an American physician-scientist who served as deputy director for clinical research and special projects at the National Institute of Allergy and Infectious Diseases (NIAID) from 2006 to 2025. He conducted research on HIV/AIDS and emerging infectious diseases during a 45-year career at the National Institutes of Health (NIH).

== Education ==
Clifford Lane received his M.D. from the University of Michigan in 1976. He completed an internship and residency at the University of Michigan Hospital.

== Career ==
In 1979, Lane joined the National Institutes of Health (NIH) as a clinical associate in the Laboratory of Immunoregulation at the National Institute of Allergy and Infectious Diseases (NIAID). He conducted research under the direction of Anthony Fauci. In 1985, Lane was appointed deputy clinical director of NIAID. In 1989, he became chief of the Clinical and Molecular Retrovirology Section within the Laboratory of Immunoregulation.

His research included the immunopathogenesis and treatment of HIV/AIDS, the evaluation of therapeutic approaches, and clinical trials for emerging infectious diseases. Lane collaborated with other NIH institutes and international partners on studies related to various pathogens, including influenza, Ebola, Zika, and SARS-CoV-2.

In 1991, Lane became clinical director of NIAID. In 2006, he was named deputy director for clinical research and special projects at NIAID and director of the Division of Clinical Research. During the COVID-19 pandemic, he participated in NIAID's clinical research activities. In February 2020, he took part in the World Health Organization-China Joint Mission on coronavirus disease as part of a U.S. government delegation to China.

Lane was elected to the Association of American Physicians and the American Association for the Advancement of Science. He served on the editorial boards of Clinical Infectious Diseases, Journal of Infectious Diseases, Journal of Clinical Investigation, and Annals of Internal Medicine.

In April 2025, Lane was removed from his position at NIAID. According to Politico, he was among several officials reassigned or dismissed under Health and Human Services Secretary Robert F. Kennedy Jr. in a leadership reorganization at NIH. Lane had worked at NIH for 45 years and was identified in the report as a close colleague of Anthony Fauci.
