= Open Forum Infectious Diseases =

Academic journal

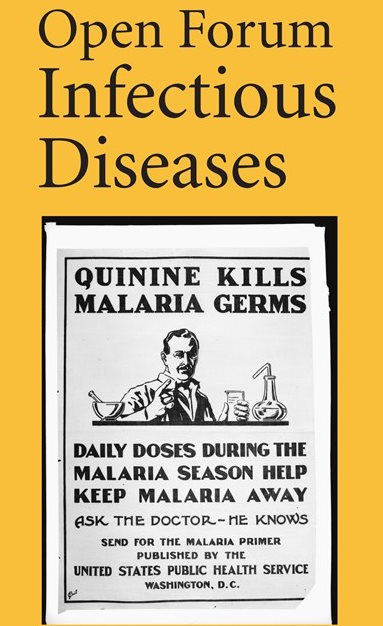
- March 2019 issue cover
- Discipline: Infectious disease
- Language: English
- Edited by: Roger Bedimo

Publication details
- History: 2014–present
- Publisher: Oxford University Press on behalf of the Infectious Diseases Society of America and HIV Medicine Association
- Frequency: Monthly
- Open access: Yes
- License: Creative Commons or Government/Crown
- Impact factor: 4.423 (2021)

Standard abbreviations
- ISO 4: Open Forum Infect. Dis.

Indexing
- CODEN: OFIDA2
- ISSN: 2328-8957
- OCLC no.: 841980044

Links
- Journal homepage

Open Forum Infectious Diseases (OFID) is a peer-reviewed open-access scientific journal focusing on the field of infectious disease. It is operated by the Infectious Diseases Society of America (IDSA) and HIV Medicine Association and published online-only by Oxford University Press.

The journal was launched in 2014 with infectious disease physician Paul Sax serving as editor-in-chief. In 2023, Roger Bedimo, Chief of Infectious Diseases Section at the VA North Texas Health Care System and Professor of Medicine at the University of Texas Southwestern Medical Center in Dallas became editor-in-chief after Sax was appointed editor-in-chief of sister IDSA journal Clinical Infectious Diseases.

Initially organized in quarterly issues, the publication expanded to monthly issues in 2018. Since its inception, OFID has also published free podcast interviews with experts in the area of infectious disease.

== See also ==
- The Journal of Infectious Diseases
