= Robert M. Hecht =

Robert Michael Hecht (born 1953) is an American global health policy and financing expert. Hecht is currently Founder and President of Pharos Global Health Advisors. He has previously held positions with the World Bank, UNAIDS, the International AIDS Vaccine Initiative, and Results for Development Institute. Since 2017 he has been a clinical professor at the Yale School of Public Health. From 2014-23 he was a lecturer at Yale University’s Jackson Institute for Global Affairs. Hecht has published on a range of topics in global health and development, with a special focus on the economics, financing, and policies for infectious diseases (HIV, tuberculosis, Hepatitis, malaria), immunization, nutrition, pandemic preparedness and response, and broader health system and financing reform. He has been an advisor to the President's Emergency Plan for AIDS Relief (PEPFAR), the World Health Organization, and UNITAID. Hecht holds a BA from Yale College and a PhD from University of Cambridge.

== Professional life ==
=== World Bank ===
After earning his PhD, Hecht joined the World Bank in 1981. There, he was part of the core team that produced the landmark 1993 World Development Report: Investing in Health. In the mid-1990s he led the Bank’s efforts to assist Latin American countries, including Argentina, with reform of their health insurance systems. In 2002, Hecht was the main author for the Bank’s Health, Nutrition, and Population Sector Strategy. While at the World Bank he also served on the boards of the GAVI vaccine alliance, Stop TB Partnership, and the Global Forum for Health Research.

=== UNAIDS ===
From 1998-2001, Hecht served as Director of the Department of Policy, Strategy, and Research at the United Nations Joint Program on HIV/AIDS. There, he helped to design and implement UNAIDS strategy to document the links between HIV and poverty, economic growth, and social progress, and to advocate for increased investment in responding to HIV in low- and middle-income countries. While at UNAIDS he managed headquarters and regionally-based technical teams for Africa and Asia.

=== International AIDS Vaccine Initiative ===
Hecht held the position of Senior Vice President of Public Policy at the International AIDS Vaccine Initiative (IAVI) from 2004-2008. He directed IAVI’s department for policy research and advocacy, focusing on analysis of the potential economic impact of an AIDS vaccine and of options for innovative financing and incentives for new health technologies of neglected diseases.

=== Results for Development Institute (R4D) ===
During his eight years at R4D (2008-16) Hecht worked as Managing Director and oversaw policy research and advisory services on the long-term financing of the global response to HIV/AIDS, immunization policy, malaria, nutrition, global health research and development, and health financing reform. His teams produced a series of reports that helped to influence HIV, immunization, and other policies in several countries and in global health initiatives including GAVI and the Global Fund to Fight AIDS, Tuberculosis and Malaria.

=== Yale University ===
From 2014 to 2023, Hecht was as Lecturer and Fellow at the Yale Jackson Institute for Global Affairs (now the Yale Jackson School of Global Affairs). In May 2017 he was appointed as a Clinical Professor at the Yale School of Public Health. There, he teaches in global health and conducts policy research. In 2024 he assumed leadership of a new collaboration between Yale and the Cambodia National Institute of Public Health to teach a Masters concentration in health economics and financing. From 2011 to 2022 Hecht was a member of the Dean’s Leadership Council at the Yale School of Public Health. He has established a named award program at Yale that provides grants annually to junior faculty and to interdisciplinary teams undertaking innovative research in global health.

=== Pharos Global Health ===
In May 2016, Hecht co-founded with Dr. Shan Soe Lin a new non-profit organization, Pharos Global Health Advisors, whose mission is to improve global health outcomes by applying analytics and policy dialogue so that international leaders make sound and efficient decisions in the allocation of scarce resources in health and nutrition. Focus areas include scaling up HIV, Hepatitis and other disease control efforts, ensuring sustainable financing of childhood immunization programs, working with countries to transition away from donor funding to self-sufficiency in essential health services, implementation of new models for community-based primary care, promoting cost-effective use of vaccination for adults in a rapidly ageing world, and design of effective structures for expanding national malnutrition programs.

== Personal life ==
Hecht was born in Cambridge, Massachusetts and is the son of the late Amalie Kass (nee Moses) and the late Malcolm Hecht Jr.

Hecht’s father was founder and president of the Unitrode Corporation, a manufacturer of high-performance semiconductors, capacitors and other electronic components, which was acquired by Texas Instruments in 1999. His stepfather, Dr. Edward H. Kass, was William Ellery Channing Professor at the Harvard Medical School before his death in 1990. His mother was a medical historian who held a Research Associate position at the Countway Library, Harvard Medical School, and served as Chair of the Board of Trustees of the Massachusetts Historical Society and as a Trustee of Wellesley College.

His uncle Alfred H. Moses was a law partner at Covington and Burling and a founder of Promontory Financial Group, and is a former US ambassador to Romania. His brother Jon Hecht is a Massachusetts State Representative.

== Selected works ==
Hecht is the co-author of scholarly papers and books related to immunization, HIV, Hepatitis elimination, health financing, health sector reform, and nutrition. Early in his career he authored newspaper articles on international development, which have been published in The International Herald Tribune, Financial Times, The Guardian, Washington Post, Boston Globe, and Christian Science Monitor.

Selected works include:

- Defeating AIDS - Advancing Global Health
- Funding AIDS Programmes in the Era of Shared Responsibility: an Analysis of Domestic Spending in 12 Low-Income and Middle-Income Countries
- Overcoming Challenges to Sustainable Immunization Financing: Early Experiences From GAVI Graduating Countries
- Financing of HIV/AIDS Programme Scale Up in Low-Income and Middle-Income Countries, 2009-31
- Critical Choices in Financing the Response to the Global HIV/AIDS Pandemic
- Improving Health R&D Financing for Developing Countries: A Menu of Innovative Policy Options
- Estimating Demand for a Preventative AIDS Vaccine – Why We Need to Do Better
- 1993 World Development Report: Investing in Health
