= Cynthia Sears =

Cynthia Louise Sears is an American infectious disease physician-scientist specializing in food borne and intestinal infections. She is a professor of medicine, oncology, molecular biology, and immunology at the Johns Hopkins School of Medicine. She holds the Bloomberg-Kimmel Professorship of Cancer Immunotherapy.

== Life ==
Sears earned a M.D. from Jefferson Medical College in 1977. She completed training in internal medicine at The New York Hospital and in infectious diseases at the Sloan-Kettering Institute for Cancer Research and the University of Virginia.

In 1988, Sears joined Johns Hopkins School of Medicine. She is a professor of medicine, oncology, molecular biology, and immunology. She holds the Bloomberg-Kimmel Professorship of Cancer Immunotherapy. Sears is the director of the microbiome program at the Bloomberg Kimmel Institute for Cancer Immunotherapy. She served as the president of the Infectious Diseases Society of America in 2019. She is the editor-in-chief of The Journal of Infectious Diseases. In 2024, she was elected a Fellow of the American Association for the Advancement of Science.
