= Preeti N. Malani =

American researcher

- Born: Michigan, USA
- Relatives: Anu Malani

Academic background
- Education: BA, 1990, M.S, 2007, University of Michigan; M.S.J., 1991, Medill School of Journalism; MD, 1995, Wayne State University School of Medicine

Academic work
- Institutions: University of Michigan

Preeti N. Malani is an American researcher. She is the Chief Health Officer in the Divisions of Infectious Diseases and Geriatric Medicine at the University of Michigan and an associate editor of the Journal of the American Medical Association (JAMA). Her research focus is on infectious disease control and prevention in older adults.

== Early life and education ==
Malani was born and raised in Michigan with her brother, Anu Malani. After her ninth-grade algebra teacher refused to let her double up on math, she chose a journalism course to fill her timetable. Malani became increasingly more interested in journalism throughout her four years of high school and became the editor of the high school paper.

== Higher education and medical training ==
Following graduation, Malani enrolled at the University of Michigan where she designed an independent curriculum in medical journalism. She once again served as a writer for the school paper and applied to Medill School of Journalism since she had not fully completed the requirements for medical school. During the summer before she started journalism school, Malani earned an internship with the Dayton Daily News, where she discovered she would rather pursue medicine than journalism. After completing her Master of Science in journalism, Malani enrolled at Wayne State University School of Medicine for her Medical Degree and completed her Internal Medicine residency and Infectious Diseases fellowship at the University of Michigan.

== Academic career and research contributions ==
After completing her residency and fellowship in Infectious Diseases at Michigan Medicine's department of internal medicine, she was appointed as a lecturer. She was eventually promoted to associate professor of Medicine in the Divisions of Infectious Diseases and Geriatric Medicine in 2009 and appointed assistant deputy editor of the peer-reviewed medical journal Clinical Infectious Diseases in 2010. Following her appointment, Malani worked alongside Michael Heung, Jonathan Segal, and Therese Adamowski in the Divisions of Nephrology and Geriatric Medicine to co-author a study detailing the safety approach for preventing falls among hemodialysis patients. Their recommendations of installing lift devices and in-ground scales dropped falling by 70 percent and only three falls were reported in a 21-month follow-up period.

== Leadership roles ==
By 2014, Malani was promoted from Clinical Associate Professor of Internal Medicine to Clinical Professor of Internal Medicine. A few years later, she was appointed the Chief Health Officer for the University of Michigan as a replacement for Robert Winfield. As chief health officer, she advises the university president on all matters of health and well-being. She also helped launch the National Poll on Healthy Aging based at University of Michigan's Institute for Health Policy and Innovation focusing on health-related issues facing older Americans. One of the polls collected data on prescription drug use for people between the ages of 50 and 80.

== COVID-19 contributions ==
During the COVID-19 pandemic, Malani co-published COVID-19—New Insights on a Rapidly Changing Epidemic and released guidelines for students returning to school.

In February 2020, Malani co-authored an article for JAMA containing important updates on the clinical features of COVID-19 for medical professionals to use in their evaluations of patients.
