= Robert Hecht =

Robert Hecht is the name of:

- Robert E. Hecht (1919–2012), American antiquities dealer
- Robert Hecht-Nielsen (1947–2019), adjunct professor of electrical and computer engineering at the University of California, San Diego
- Robert M. Hecht (born 1953), American global health policy and financing expert
