= Robert Kass =

American statistician

Robert E. Kass
- Born: September 7, 1952 (age 74); Boston, Massachusetts, USA
- Education: University of Chicago (PhD); Antioch College (BA)
- Known for: Computational Neuroscience, Bayesian Statistics
- Awards: R. A. Fisher Lectureship, Elected to the National Academy of Sciences
- Scientific career
- Fields: Statistics
- Workplaces: Carnegie Mellon University
- Thesis: (1980)
- Doctoral advisor: Stephen Stigler
- Website: www.stat.cmu.edu/~kass/

Robert E. Kass is the Maurice Falk University Professor of Statistics and Computational Neuroscience in the Department of Statistics and Data Science, the Machine Learning Department, and the Neuroscience Institute at Carnegie Mellon University.

== Early life and education ==
Born in Boston, Massachusetts (1952), Kass earned a Bachelor of Arts degree in mathematics from Antioch College, and a PhD degree in statistics from the University of Chicago in 1980, where his advisor was Stephen Stigler. Kass is the son of the late Harvard medical researcher Edward H. Kass and stepson of the late Amalie M. Kass. His sister is the bioethicist Nancy Kass.

== Research and publications ==
Kass's early research was on differential geometry in statistics, which formed the basis for his book Geometrical Foundations of Asymptotic Inference (with Paul Vos), and on Bayesian methods. Since 2000 his research has focused on statistical methods in neuroscience.

Kass's best-known work includes a comprehensive re-evaluation of Bayesian hypothesis testing and model selection, and the selection of prior distributions, the relationship of Bayes and Empirical Bayes methods, Bayesian asymptotics, the application of point process statistical models to neural spiking data, the challenges of multiple spike train analysis, the state-space approach to brain-computer interface, and the brain's apparent ability to solve the credit assignment problem during brain-controlled robotic movement. Kass's book Analysis of Neural Data (with Emery Brown and Uri Eden) was published in 2014. Kass has also written on statistics education and the use of statistics, including the articles, "What is Statistics?", "Statistical Inference: The Big Picture," and "Ten Simple Rules for Effective Statistical Practice".

== Professional and administrative activities ==
Kass has served Chair of the Section for Bayesian Statistical Science of the American Statistical Association, Chair of the Statistics Section of the American Association for the Advancement of Science, founding Editor-in-Chief of Bayesian Analysis (journal), and Executive Editor (editor-in-chief) of the international review journal Statistical Science. At Carnegie Mellon University he was Department Head of Statistics from 1995 to 2004 and Interim Co-director of the joint CMU–University of Pittsburgh Center for the Neural Basis of Cognition 2015–2018.

== Honors ==
Kass is an elected Fellow of the American Statistical Association, the Institute of Mathematical Statistics, and the American Association for the Advancement of Science, and an elected member of the National Academy of Sciences. For his work on statistical modeling of neural synchrony, in 2013 he received the Outstanding Statistical Application Award from the American Statistical Association, and in 2017 he received the R.A. Fisher Award and Lectureship, now known as the COPSS Distinguished Achievement Award and Lectureship, from the Committee of Presidents of Statistical Societies.
