= Bryan Versteeg =

Canadian artist

- Born: c1975
- Occupation: Conceptual artist
- Known for: Conceptual visualization of space exploration
- Notable work: The animations and illustrations on the Mars One website
- Website: www.bryanversteeg.com

Bryan Versteeg is a Canadian conceptual artist in the architectural and engineering fields, with particular emphasis on space exploration concepts.

He started work prior to 1992 and has focused on architectural rendering and photography since 2001.

He has worked independently since 2006 and in 2011 founded Spacehabs.com to focus on the conceptual visualization of space exploration. He owns a company, Bryan Versteeg Studios Inc., in Calgary, Alberta, Canada.

Versteeg has done work for Deep Space Industries (of which he is a co-founder), National Geographic, New Scientist, Mars Exploration Magazine, Interorbital Systems, the Mars Foundation and Mars One for which he created all the animations and illustrations used on their website.
