= Deep Space Industries =

Former aerospace company

- Industry: Space technology Space exploration
- Founded: January 22, 2013
- Founder: Rick N. Tumlinson; Daniel Faber; David Gump; Kirby Ikin; John C. Mankins; Stephen Covey; Mark Sonter; Christopher Cassell; James Luebke; Bryan Versteeg; James Wolff
- Defunct: 1 January 2019
- Headquarters: San Jose, California, United States
- Key people: Bill Miller, CEO; Grant Bonin, CTO; Sagi Kfir, General Counsel
- Products: Deep Space Xplorer, Comet
- Website: deepspace.industries/en/

Deep Space Industries, or DSI, was an American privately-held company operating in the space technology and space exploration sectors. It initially focused on asteroid mining, including spacecraft concepts for harvesting resources for in-space use. It was acquired on January 1, 2019 by Bradford Space.

The company was developing and building spacecraft technology to provide fuel, water and oxygen to spacecraft from in-space sources. This would have allowed private companies and government agencies to access destinations throughout the Solar System. DSI's goal was to facilitate access to deep space and substantially lower the cost of doing so.

== History ==
DSI was formally announced on January 22, 2013. DSI spent 3-½ years investigating the feasibility of space resource utilization. In late 2015, DSI received venture funding to begin the development of a propulsion system and spacecraft capable of traveling from low Earth orbit (LEO) to deep space on its own.

As of 2013, the company CEO was David Gump, previously of Transformational Space Corporation and Astrobotic Technology. Chairman Rick N. Tumlinson was a founder of the Space Frontier Foundation, among other organizations in the field of space exploration.

In December 2014, Daniel Faber became the CEO. In January 2017 DSI named Bill Miller as Chief Executive Officer. Miller was a startup strategist.

In 2019 the company was acquired by Bradford Space, a manufacturer of spaceflight components & systems.

== Spacecraft and technologies ==
As of June 2018, Deep Space Industries was working on a series of technologies that aimed to lower the cost of access to high Earth orbits and deep space for private companies and government agencies.

Xplorer was a spacecraft concept designed to use its own propulsion system to travel from low Earth orbit (LEO) to an Earth departure trajectory or higher Earth orbits such as geostationary orbit (GEO). Xplorer was to be built to enable exploration and high delta-V applications within low Earth orbits, geosynchronous orbit, near-Earth asteroids, and deep space destinations such as Lunar orbits, Venus, or Mars.

Xplorer was planned to give a 10 kg payload a delta-V capability of approximately 5 km/s, with greater payload masses possible at lower delta-V requirements. Xplorer was planned to be capable of launching on a variety of commercial rideshares to low Earth orbit, and to decouple launch timing from orbit raising and Earth departure maneuvers.

Meteor was a non-toxic rocket thruster using propellants capable of being synthesized from in-space resources. It was designed & prototyped as the propulsive core of the Xplorer vehicle.

Comet is a launch-safe electrothermal propulsion system designed for orbit raising, life extension, and de-orbit. It uses water as a propellant, and is scalable from CubeSats to micro-satellites, with a flexible interface suitable for a wide range of spacecraft. Several comet systems were sold to various customers and flew as part of various satellites built for HawkEye 360, Astro Digital, and Capella Space; production is ongoing in Luxembourg under new ownership.

== Criticism ==
External audio
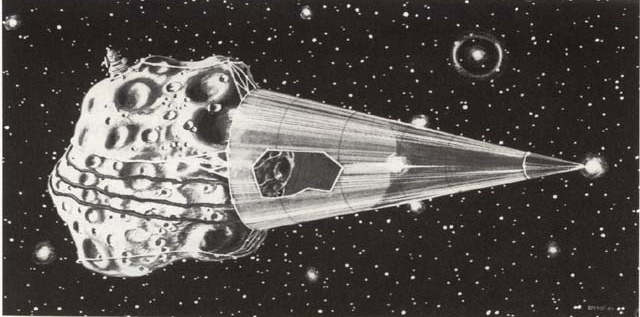
- “Episode 206: Is Space the Place? Trying to Save Humanity by Mining Asteroids”, Science History Institute

The announcement of DSI was met with both praise and criticism. Several unnamed scientists questioned whether cost-effective asteroid mining could even be accomplished given competition in Earth terrestrial markets and the high cost of returning high-value minerals to Earth. However, DSI responded to these statements by stating that the majority of the materials mined — principally water — would be destined for use in space, thus avoiding the enormous fuel costs of repeatedly returning to and escaping from Earth's gravitational field, and additionally, that servicing communications satellite constellations could earn the company $5 to 8 million per month.

Whether Deep Space Industries would be competing in similar services as Planetary Resources was also questioned. In particular, Planetary Resources did not release information on their intentions for processing, power generation, or in-space manufacturing hardware and equipment.

Deep Space Industries did not announce its spacecraft manufacturing partnerships for the FireFly 1.

== See also ==
- Asteroid mining
- In situ resource utilization
- Mining the Sky
- Planetary Resources
- Shackleton Energy Company
- Space manufacturing
- Space technology
- Space trade
- Space-based economy
- SpaceDev
