= Southern Tenant Folk Union =

Scottish folk group

- Origin: Edinburgh, Scotland, UK
- Genres: Acoustic folk Bluegrass
- Years active: 2006–present
- Labels: Johnny Rock Records; Ugly Nephew Records
- Members: Southern Tenant Folk Union - Rory Butler – guitar and lead vocals; Steve Fivey – percussion; Katherine Stewart – fiddle and vocals; Pat McGarvey – banjo and vocals - The Southern Tenant - Pat McGarvey - synths, programming, guitar, bass and vocals; Steve Ironside - synths, programming and drum machines
- Past members: Oliver Talkes – guitar and vocals; Pete Gow – guitar, harmonica and vocals; Eamonn Flynn – mandolin and vocals; Matt Lloyd – upright bass and vocals; Frances Vaux – fiddle and vocals; Roddy Neilson – fiddle and vocals; Silas Child – double bass; Cammie Henderson – fiddle; John Langan – lead vocals and percussion; Jed Milroy – lead vocals, guitar, clarinet, harmonica and clawhammer banjo; Ewan Macintyre – lead vocals, harmonica, guitar and percussion; Jenny Hill – double bass; Marty Camino – double bass; Adam Bulley – mandolin; Carrie Thomas – fiddle; Alex Hunter – double bass; Dirk Ronneburg - fiddle; Danny Hart - mandolin: Richard Kass - percussion; Craig Macfadyen – double bass; Chris Purcell – guitar and lead vocals; Doug Kemp – double bass;
- Website: www.southerntenantfolkunion.com

Southern Tenant Folk Union is a Scottish folk group based in Edinburgh. The group combines English and Celtic folk sounds with American bluegrass music.

The band was formed by five-string banjo player Pat McGarvey, who was born in Belfast.

The band performed on BBC One's The Andrew Marr Show on 15 September 2013.

There is additionally an electronic version of the band led by Pat McGarvey called The Southern Tenant making synth and soundtrack related music that have released two albums to date, and have a third coming out on 30/9/2022 called Halloween Hits Vol. 1

== Discography ==
Album	Release date	Label
Southern Tenant Folk Union	24 January 2007	Ugly Nephew Records (UNR004)
Revivals, Rituals & Union Songs	7 March 2008	Ugly Nephew Records (UNR011)
The New Farming Scene	June 2010	Johnny Rock Records (JOROCK011)
Pencaitland	19 July 2011	Johnny Rock Records (JOROCK013)
Hello Cold Goodbye Sun	January 2013	Johnny Rock Records (JOROCK 017)
The Chuck Norris Project	January 2015	Johnny Rock Records (JOROCK 019/020)
Join Forces	September 2016	Johnny Rock Records (JOROCK 023)
The Horror of The Right by 'The Southern Tenant'	June 2017	Johnny Rock Records (JOROCK 026)
The Sleeper Awakens by 'The Southern Tenant'	November 2017	Johnny Rock Records (JOROCK 027)
Halloween Hits Vol. 1: Enter The Horror Disco by 'The Southern Tenant'	September 2022	Johnny Rock Records (JOROCK 029)

EP	Release date	Label
Men in Robes	28 October 2012	Johnny Rock Records (JOROCK 016)

Single	Release date	Label
"Cocaine"	2007	Ugly Nephew Records (UNR006)
