= James W. Moulder =

American microbiologist

James William Moulder (March 28, 1921 – May 6, 2011), was an American microbiologist.

== Biography ==
Moulder graduated from the University of Chicago with a bachelor's degree in 1941 and a Ph.D. in biochemistry in 1944. From 1944 to 1945 he was a research associate in malaria at an Office of Scientific Research and Development project in Chicago. In the early part of his career he did research on the biochemistry and immunology of Plasmodium and Trypanosoma. At the University of Chicago he was an instructor from 1946 to 1947 and was appointed to an assistant professorship in 1947. He was eventually promoted to a full professorship and retired as professor emeritus in 1986. At the University of Chicago he chaired the department of bacteriology and parasitology and, later, the department of microbiology. From 1957 to 1968 he was the co-editor-in-chief or editor-in-chief of the Journal of Infectious Diseases.

For the academic year 1952–1953, Moulder was a Guggenheim Fellow. From 1952 to 1953 he was a senior Fulbright scholar at the University of Oxford, UK. In 1954 he received the Eli Lilly and Company-Elanco Research Award. In 1999 he received the Bergey Medal.

After retiring from the University of Chicago, Moulder and his wife moved to Tucson, Arizona. Until 1998 he advised students and faculty in the University of Arizona's department of microbiology and immunology.

He and his wife had three daughters and a son. He was predeceased by his wife and two of his daughters. Upon his death he was survived by one daughter, one son and five grandchildren.

== Selected publications ==
=== Articles ===
- Speck, John F.; Moulder, James W.; Evans Jr., E. A. (1946). "The biochemistry of the malaria parasite: V. Mechanism of pyruvate oxidation in the malaria parasite". Journal of Biological Chemistry. 164 (1): 119–144. doi:10.1016/S0021-9258(18)43053-0. PMID 20989474.
- Moulder, J. W. (1966). "The Relation of the Psittacosis Group (Chlamydiae) to Bacteria and Viruses". Annual Review of Microbiology. 20: 107–130. doi:10.1146/annurev.mi.20.100166.000543. PMID 5330228.
- Moulder, James W. (1974). "Intracellular Parasitism: Life in an Extreme Environment". The Journal of Infectious Diseases. 130 (3): 300–306. doi:10.1093/infdis/130.3.300. JSTOR 30061703. PMID 4413960.
- Byrne, G. I.; Moulder, J. W. (1978). "Parasite-specified phagocytosis of Chlamydia psittaci and Chlamydia trachomatis by L and He La cells". Infection and Immunity. 19 (2): 598–606. doi:10.1128/iai.19.2.598-606.1978. PMC 414125. PMID 344217.
- Moulder, James W.; Levy, Nancy J.; Schulman, Laura P. (1980). "Persistent Infection of Mouse Fibroblasts (L Cells) with Chlamydia psittaci : Evidence for a Cryptic Chlamydial Form". Infection and Immunity. 30 (3): 874–883. doi:10.1128/iai.30.3.874-883.1980. PMC 551395. PMID 6262243.
- Barron, Almen L., ed. (2019). "Characteristics of Chlamydiae by James W. Moulder". Microbiology of Chlamydia. CRC Press. pp. 3–20. ISBN 978-0429276521. (1st edition, 1988)
- Moulder, J. W. (1991). "Interaction of chlamydiae and host cells in vitro". Microbiological Reviews. 55 (1): 143–190. doi:10.1128/mr.55.1.143-190.1991. PMC 372804. PMID 2030670.
- Moulder, J. W. (1993). "Why is Chlamydia sensitive to penicillin in the absence of peptidoglycan?". Infectious Agents and Disease. 2 (2): 87–99. PMID 8162358.
- Wei, Jun; Dahl, John L.; Moulder, James W.; Roberts, Esteban A.; O'Gaora, Peadar; Young, Douglas B.; Friedman, Richard L. (2000). "Identification of a Mycobacterium tuberculosis Gene That Enhances Mycobacterial Survival in Macrophages". Journal of Bacteriology. 182 (2): 377–384. doi:10.1128/JB.182.2.377-384.2000. PMC 94286. PMID 10629183.

=== Books and monographs ===
- Moulder, James W. (1962). Biochemistry of intracellular parasitism. University of Chicago Press. ISBN 0226542483.
- Moulder, James W. (1964). The Psittacosis Group as Bacteria. Wiley. ISBN 9780471619567; 95 pages
- Moulder, James W. (28 October 2020). Intracellular Parasitism. CRC Press. ISBN 9781000141665.
