= Raye Kass =

Scientist

- Education: Sir George Williams University

Raye Kass is a professor in the Department of Applied Human Sciences at Concordia University in Montreal. She is the author of Theories of Small Group Development and the co-author of three other works on social group theory. She has also been invited to be involved in space research projects.

Kass was previously an advisor for Mars One, a now bankrupt organization which aimed to establish a human colony on Mars.

== Education ==
She attended Sir George Williams University in 1970, where she earned her Baccalaureate of Arts with Distinction. Afterwards she did her Master of Social Work at the University of Toronto, completing it in 1972. Later on, she gained her PhD in Educational Theory at University of Toronto by 1987.

== Selected bibliography ==
- Kass, R.; Kass, J.; Binder, H.; Kraft, N. (2010). "Conflict-Handling Mode Scores of Three Crews Before and After a 264-Day Spaceflight Simulation". Aviation, Space, and Environmental Medicine. 81 (5): 502–505. doi:10.3357/ASEM.1623.2010. PMID 20464818.
- Kass, J; Kass, R; Samaltedinov, I (1995). "Psychological considerations of man in space: Problems & solutions". Acta Astronautica. 36 (8–12): 657–60. Bibcode:1995AcAau..36..657K. doi:10.1016/0094-5765(95)00155-7. PMID 11541001.
- Kass, R; Kass, J (1995). "Group dynamics training for manned spaceflight and the CAPSULS mission: Prophylactic against incompatibility and its consequences?". Acta Astronautica. 36 (8–12): 567–73. Bibcode:1995AcAau..36..567K. doi:10.1016/0094-5765(95)00143-3. PMID 11540989.
- Kass, R; Kass, J; Binder, H; Kraft, N (2010). "Conflict-handling mode scores of three crews before and after a 264-day spaceflight simulation". Aviation, Space, and Environmental Medicine. 81 (5): 502–5. doi:10.3357/asem.1623.2010. PMID 20464818.
- Kass, R; Kass, J (1999). "Psycho-social training for man in space". Acta Astronautica. 45 (2): 115–8. Bibcode:1999AcAau..45..115K. doi:10.1016/s0094-5765(99)00108-3. PMID 11543208.
- Kass, R. (2002). Theories of small group development. Centre for Human Relations and Community Studies, Concordia University.
