= Mars One =

Defunct foundation and company that promoted Mars colonization

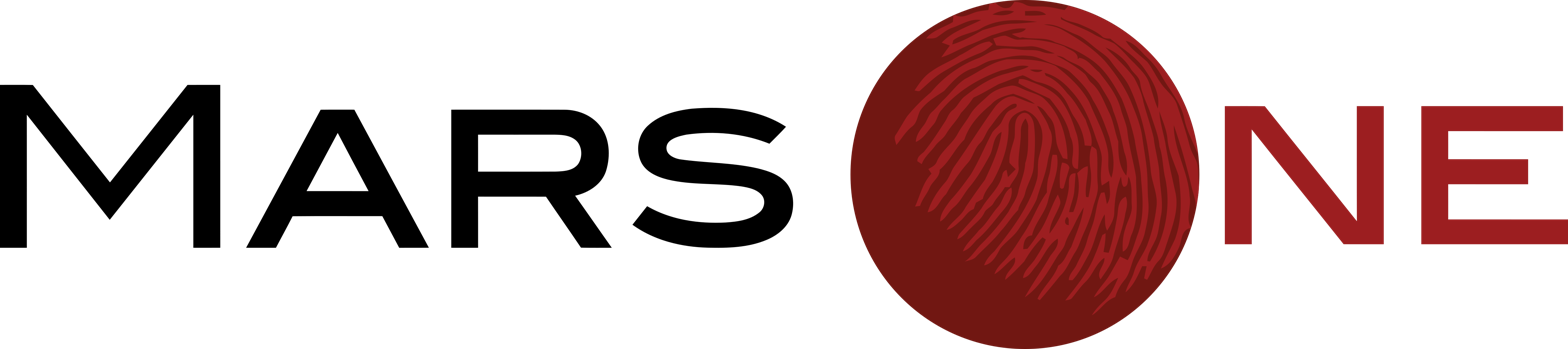
- Founded: 2012; 14 years ago
- Founder: Bas Lansdorp
- Dissolved: February 2019
- Type: Private organization
- Legal status: Defunct
- Purpose: Permanent Mars settlement
- Location: Netherlands
- CEO: Bas Lansdorp
- Key people: Chief Technical Officer and co-founder Arno Wielders, Chief Medical Officer Norbert Kraft, Mission Concept Artist Bryan Versteeg, Senior Marketing Strategist KC Frank, and Chief Information Officer Tom Van Braeckel.[1]
- Staff: 4 (2012)
- Website: https://www.mars-one.com

Mars One was a small private Dutch firm that accepted money from investors planning to land the first humans on Mars and leave them there to establish a permanent human colony. From its announcement in 2012 until its bankruptcy in early 2019, it is estimated to have received tens of millions of dollars. Mars One was not an aerospace company and did not manufacture hardware.

Mars One consisted of two entities: the not-for-profit Mars One Foundation, and the for-profit company Mars One Ventures which was the controlling stockholder of the for-profit Interplanetary Media Group that also managed the broadcasting rights. The Mars One Foundation, based in the Netherlands, managed the project. The company had four employees, and intended to make profits by selling media (documentaries) about the personnel selection, training and colonization. The first mission was estimated by its CEO Bas Lansdorp to cost about $6 billion.

The concept was criticized by scientists, engineers, and those in the aerospace industry as glossing over logistics and medical concerns, and lacking critical concepts about hardware. The concept was called a suicide mission by academia, the spaceflight industry, and international news. On 15 January 2019, a court decision was made to liquidate the for-profit company, bankrupting it in the process.

== Origin ==
Mars One's original concept included launching a robotic Mars lander and Mars orbiter as early as 2020, to be followed by a human crew of four in 2024, and one in 2026 which would not return to Earth. Although the announcement garnered much international publicity, the concept was criticized by scientists, engineers, and people in the aerospace industry. Mars One was said to be very short on funding, lacking critical concepts about hardware, life support, electrical power supply, and was criticized as glossing over logistics, medical concerns, and protection against space radiation. The concept was called a suicide mission in academia, spaceflight, and international news.

By February 2015, two conceptual studies were done by contractors. Despite the criticism and lack of funding, about 2,700 people applied to become one of the 24 finalists "to settle Mars".

== Initial mission concept ==
In December 2013, Mars One announced its concept of a robotic precursor mission. Originally scheduled for launch in 2020, the roadmap later called for the launch to occur in 2022. If funded, the robotic lander would be "built by Lockheed Martin based on the design used for NASA's Phoenix and InSight landers, as well as a communications orbiter built by Surrey Satellite Technology Limited." In February 2015, Lockheed Martin and Surrey Satellite Technology confirmed that contracts on the initial study phase begun in late 2013 had run out and additional contracts had not been received for further progress on the robotic missions. Plans were set in motion to raise the US$200 million needed to support the initial robotic mission, but some critics did not find the economic plans to raise money from private investors and exclusive broadcasting rights to be sufficient to support the initial, or follow-on, mission(s).

Mars One selected a second-round pool of astronaut candidates in 2013. Mars One received interest from over 200,000 applicants for the first round. However, as candidate Joseph Roche asserted, the number of initial applicants who completed the application process was only 2,761, which Mars One later confirmed via YouTube video. The second-round pool was reduced to 705 candidates (418 men and 287 women) in the beginning of May 2014. 353 were removed due to personal considerations. After the medical physical requirement, 660 candidates remained. The third round of candidate selection concluded in 2015. The remaining 100 candidates, known as The Mars 100, consisted of 50 men and 50 women who were slated to move forward to the next round, where 40 individuals would have been chosen through an interview process.

On 30 June 2014, it was made public that Mars One was seeking financial investment through a bidding process to send company experiments to Mars. The experiment slots would go to the highest bidder and would include company-related ads, and the opportunity to have the company name on the robotic lander that was proposed to carry the experiments to Mars in 2018.

In a video posted on 19 March 2015, Lansdorp said that because of delays in funding the robotic precursor mission, the first crew would not land on Mars until 2027. Following the criticism reported in The Space Review in October 2016 about funding mechanisms, Mars One created Mars One Ventures. In late 2016 Mars One had changed its first crewed mission date to 2032.

=== 2014 robotic lander ===
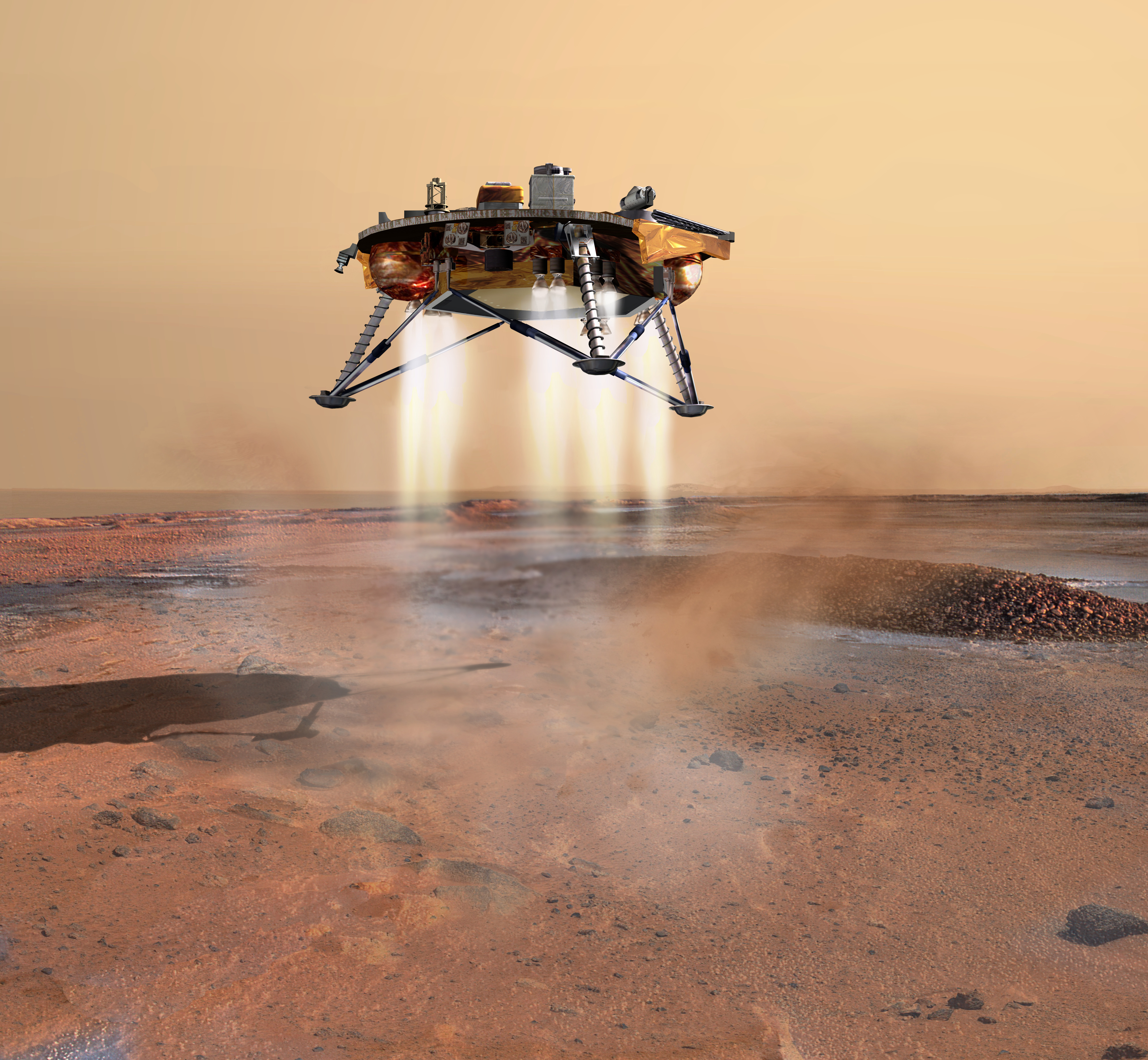
Artist's impression of the NASA Phoenix spacecraft as it lands on Mars

In December 2013, mission concept studies for a robotic Mars lander were contracted with Lockheed Martin for a demonstration mission concept. It would be based on the design of the successful 2007 NASA Phoenix lander, and provide proof of concept for a subset of the key technologies for a later human settlement on Mars. Upon submission of Lockheed Martin's Proposal Information Package, Mars One released a Request for Proposals for the various payloads on the lander. The total payload mass of 44 kg was divided among the seven payloads as follows:

1. Water extraction (10 kg)
2. Soil acquisition (15 kg)
3. Thin film solar power demonstrator (6 kg)
4. Camera system (5 kg)
5. Open for random proposals from the highest bidder (4 kg)
6. Educational payload (2 kg)
7. Winning university experiment (2 kg)

=== Further plans ===
A robotic rover was proposed to be launched to Mars in 2022, in order to scout a landing site for the 2027 lander and a site for the Mars One colony. At the same time, a communication satellite would be launched, enabling continuous communication with the future landed assets. For 2024, six cargo missions were proposed, in close succession, consisting of two living units, two life-support units, and two supply units; a spacecraft transporting four astronauts was proposed to meet a transit vehicle bound for Mars. For 2025, the landing module transporting four astronauts was proposed to land on Mars. They envisioned the crew to be met by the rover, and taken to the Mars One colony.

TABLE 1: Mission elements road-map
Initial concept	Last concept^{a}	Desired milestone	Situation at end of Program
2015	2018	Candidate pool would be reduced to 40 people, possible building of the settlement for training purposes.	The candidate pool was reduced to 100
2016	2024	The first communication satellite (ComSat), and a lander to demonstrate certain key technologies.	One initial concept study by Lockheed Martin (lander) and Surrey Satellite Technology (orbiter); Not funded nor designed.
2018	2026	A rover (yet to be designed) would be launched to help select the location of the settlement. A second ComSat would launch to L5 to enable near-24/7 communication.	Not contracted^{b}
2020	2029	A second rover and six notional modified SpaceX Dragon capsules and another rover would launch with two living units, two life-support units and two supply units.	Not contracted^{b}^{c}
2021	2030	The autonomous rovers would begin settlement assembly. The Environmental Control and Life Support System (ECLSS) would produce a breathable atmosphere of 0.7 bar pressure, 3000 liters of water, 240 kg of oxygen, which would be stored in the habitat for later use.	Not contracted
2022	2031	A notional SpaceX Falcon Heavy would launch with the first group of four colonists.	Not contracted^{c}
2023	2032	The first colonists arrive on Mars in a notional lander.	Not contracted^{c}
2024	2033	Second crew of four colonists would be launched.	Not planned
2025	2034	Second crew would arrive on Mars.	Not planned
2031	2040	The colony would consist of 20 settlers.	Not planned

Notes:
^aThe initial concept timeline slipped 2 times, with a 2-year delay each time.
^bWork on robotic missions was suspended pending further review and future contract direction in February 2015.
^cSpaceX had no contracts with MarsOne and the project did not appear on their launch manifest.

== Team and advisers ==
The Mars One team consisted of Chief Executive Officer and co-founder Bas Lansdorp, Chief Technical Officer and co-founder Arnold Wielders, Chief Medical Officer Norbert Kraft, Mission Concept Artist Bryan Versteeg, Senior Marketing Strategist KC Frank, and Chief Information Officer Tom Van Braeckel.

Mars One's team of advisers consisted of over 30 industry and scientific experts, including Mason Peck, Peter Smith, James R. Kass, K.R. Sridhara Murthi, Esther Dyson, and Robert Zubrin.

== Desired technology ==
Mars One was not an aerospace company and would not have manufactured hardware. Lansdorp assumed all major components would be available in the aerospace market, and said Mars One had identified at least one potential supplier for each component of the mission.

=== Launcher ===
SpaceX mentioned in 2014 that they had been contacted by Mars One, but that accommodating Mars One requirements would require some additional work and that such action was not a part of the current focus of SpaceX. SpaceX had no contracts with Mars One. The first Mars One cargo mission to Mars was proposed to launch by 2022, followed by a crewed mission in 2024, but without funds, hardware, and without a launcher it did not happen.

=== Mars Transit Vehicle ===
A hypothetical crewed interplanetary spacecraft, for which there were no concept design studies, was to have been assembled in low Earth orbit and comprise two propellant modules: a Transit Living Module (discarded just before arrival at Mars) and a lander (see "Human Lander" below). In 2012, Mars One speculated that the Transit Living Module might potentially be designed and built by Thales Alenia Space.

=== Demo lander ===
A concept study was produced by Lockheed Martin for a demonstration lander based on the 2008 Phoenix lander.

=== Communications system ===
In December 2013 Mars One awarded a contract to Surrey Satellite Technology for a study of the satellite technology required to provide 24/7 communication between Earth and the Mars base. Mars One proposed at least two satellites, one in areostationary orbit above Mars and a second at the Earth – Sun L4 or L5 point to relay the signal when Mars blocks the areosynchronous satellite from line of sight to Earth. It is possible that a third satellite would be required to relay the signal on the rare occasions when the Sun blocks the first relay satellite from line of sight with Earth.

=== Lander ===
An early notional crewed lander was shown in concept art as a 5-meter (16 ft)-diameter variant of SpaceX Red Dragon, but SpaceX declined to collaborate with Mars One. One mentioned supplier for the rover in 2012 was Astrobotic Technology.

=== Mars suit ===
On 12 March 2013, Paragon Space Development Corporation was contracted to develop concepts for life support and the Mars Surface Exploration Spacesuit System, which included the pressure suit and the Portable Life Support System (PLSS) that could have permitted survival outside the habitat. The suggested supplier of the suits was ILC Dover. The study was to be finished late summer 2013; Mars One released the results of the study (ECLSS portion only) to the public in June 2015, but did not fund its research and development.

=== Life support systems ===
In 2013, Mars One signed a contract with Paragon Space Development Corporation, for a preliminary life support system concept study based on the International Space Station. The idea was criticized because that system, although modern, requires significant maintenance and supplies not available while on Mars.

== Astronaut selection ==
=== Sign up period ===
The application was available from 22 April 2013 to 31 August 2013. This first application consisted of applicant's general information, a motivational letter, a résumé and a video. More than 200,000 people expressed interest. By 9 September 2013, 4,227 applicants had paid their registration fee and submitted public videos in which they made their case for going to Mars. The application fee varied from US$5 to US$75 (the amount depending on the relative wealth of the applicant's country).

=== Round 1: First selection ===
The applicants selected in this round were declared on 30 December 2013. A total of 1,058 applicants from 107 countries were selected. The gender split was 586 males (55.4%) and 472 females (44.6%). Among the people that were selected to move on to round two, 159 had a master's degrees, 347 had bachelor's degrees and 29 had Doctor of Medicine (M.D.) degrees. The majority of the applicants were under 36 years old and were well educated.

=== Round 2: The Mars 100 ===
Distribution of the 1,058 applicants selected for Round 2 according to academic degree
1. Bachelor's degree (33.0%)
2. Master's degree (15.0%)
3. PhD (8.00%)
4. Associate degree (3.00%)
5. Doctor of Medicine (3.00%)
6. Doctor of law (1.00%)
7. Other (37.0%)

Medically cleared candidates were interviewed, and 50 men and 50 women from the total pool of 660 from around the world were selected to move on to the third round of the astronaut selection process:

- Applicants by country:
  - 36 from: United States
  - 7 from: Australia
  - 4 from: Germany, South Africa, Canada, United Kingdom, Russia, India
  - 3 from: Poland
  - 2 from: Iran, China, Japan, Philippines, Spain
  - 1 from: Belgium, France, Norway, Denmark, Switzerland, Austria, Czech Republic, Brazil, Ireland, Romania, Croatia, Serbia, Ukraine, Vietnam, Pakistan, Egypt, Bolivia, Uruguay, New Zealand, Nigeria
- the youngest: 20-year-old
- the oldest: 61-year-old

Applicants were remotely interviewed and recorded by Mars One over a relatively short Skype/SparkHire call regarding Martian-related orbital, temp/pressure, geological and historical parameters and the specific elements of the Mars One one-way mission. Joseph Roche, one of the finalists, accused the selection process of being based on a point system that is primarily dependent on how much money each individual generated or gave to the Mars One organization, despite many of the round three selectees having not spent any money in the process, apart from the application fee, which varied as a function of each applicant's country Gross Domestic Product. Lansdorp acknowledged a "gamification" point system but denied that selection was based on money earned. Roche also stated that if paid for interviews, they are asked to donate 75% of the payment to Mars One. This was confirmed by Lansdorp.

=== Round 3: Group challenges ===
The company had intended that the regional selection may be broadcast as a reality television show documenting group challenges, but no deal was reached with TV producers. The audience was to select one winner per region, and the experts could select additional participants, if needed, to continue to the international level. Of the 100 candidates, 40 individuals were to be chosen through an interview process. Round 3 would take place after enough funding was secured for an "Earth-based simulation outpost."

=== Round 4: Isolation ===
The remaining 40 candidates would spend nine days in an isolation unit. The candidates would be observed to examine how they act in situations of prolonged close contact with one another. It takes a specific team dynamic to be able to handle this, and the goal of this selection round is to find those that are best suited for this challenge. After the isolation round, 30 candidates would be chosen to undergo a Mars Settler Suitability Interview.

=== Round 5: Mars Settler Suitability Interview ===
The Mars Settler Suitability Interview would have measured suitability for long-duration space missions and Mars settlement, and would last approximately 4 hours. 24 candidates would be selected after the interview and would be offered full-time employment with Mars One.

== Astronaut training ==
From the previous selection series, six groups of four were to become full-time employees of Mars One and train for the mission. A Massachusetts Institute of Technology team noted that since the company is not developing the technology needed, it is unclear what the astronauts would be training for. Mars One stated that the teams selected were going to undergo a battery of training, ranging from psycho-social skills to engineering and scientific observation.

== Revenues and investment ==
Mars One's investment of revenues
1. Concept design studies (78.3%)
2. Travel expenses (11.6%)
3. Legal expenses (3.30%)
4. Website maintenance (2.40%)
5. Communications (2.30%)
6. Office and other (2.10%)

Mars One funding came from astronaut application fees, donations, undisclosed private investment, intellectual property (IP) rights, and mostly, the potential sale of future broadcasting rights. Over three-quarters of the funds reportedly went to concept design studies. Mars One states that "income from donations and merchandise have not been used to pay salaries". To date, no financial records have been released for public viewing. Mars One initially estimated a one-way trip, excluding the cost of maintaining four astronauts on Mars until they die, at US$6 billion. Lansdorp has declined questions regarding the cost estimate.

=== Reality TV ===
A proposed global reality-TV show was intended to provide funds to finance the expedition. However, no such television show emerged and no contracts were signed. The astronaut selection process (with some public participation) was to be televised and continue through the first years of living on Mars.

Discussions between Endemol started in June 2014, producers of the Big Brother series, and Mars One ended with Endemol subsidiary Darlow Smithson Productions issuing a statement in February 2015 that they "were unable to reach agreement on the details of the contract" and that the company was "no longer involved in the project." Lansdorp updated plans to no longer include live broadcasts, but instead would rely on documentary-style short films produced by the company Stateless Media.

=== Sponsors ===
On 31 August 2012, the company announced that funding from its first sponsors was received, and that the funds were used mostly to pay for two conceptual design studies performed by aerospace suppliers Lockheed Martin (lander) and Surrey Satellite Systems (orbiter).

On 3 March 2014 Mars One announced a working agreement with Uwingu, stating that the program would use Uwingu's map of Mars in all of their missions.

=== Donations and merchandise ===
Revenues Mars One received from merchandise sales, donations and the Indiegogo crowd funding campaign until 4 July 2016:
Country of buyer/donor	Revenue amount (in US $)
United States	371,102
Canada	94,580
United Kingdom	73,289
Australia	65,799
Netherlands	42,579
Germany	39,396
Russia	20,935
Sweden	20,568
Norway	18,726
France	18,590
Denmark	15,892
Switzerland	11,782
Belgium	11,066
Spain	9,683
Brazil	8,992
Finland	8,927
Poland	7,825
Austria	7,342
New Zealand	6,087
Italy	5,428
Others (93 countries)	70,300
Total (from 113 countries): US$ 928,888

Since the official announcement of their conversion to a Stichting foundation, Mars One began accepting donations through their website. As of 4 July 2016, Mars One had received $928,888 in donations and merchandise sales. The 2016 donation update added the Indiegogo campaign ($313,744) to the private donation and merchandise total.

=== Crowdfunding ===
On 10 December 2013, Mars One created a crowdfunding campaign on Indiegogo to help fund a 2018 demonstration robotic mission that was never built. The alleged 2018 mission would have included a lander and a communications satellite to prove technologies in addition to launch and landing. The campaign goal was to raise US$400,000 by 25 January 2014. Since the ending date was drawing near, Mars One extended the ending date to 9 February 2014. By the end of the campaign, they had received $313,744. Indiegogo received a 9% ($28,237) fee for service.

== Bankruptcy ==
Trading of the shares of Mars One Ventures AG, listed on the Frankfurt (Germany) Stock Exchange, was suspended on 5 February 2019 for non-compliance with the FSE regulations when the number of shares was increased in 2017. In February 2019, it was reported that Mars One had declared bankruptcy in a Swiss court on 15 January 2019, and was permanently dissolved as a company. The total debt is approximately €1 million.

== Criticism ==
Mars One received a variety of criticism, mostly relating to medical, technical and financial feasibility. There were also unverified claims that Mars One was a scam designed to take as much money as possible from donors, including reality show contestants. Many criticized the project's US$6 billion budget as being too low to successfully transport humans to Mars, to the point of being delusional. A similar project study by NASA estimated the cost of such a feat at US$100 billion, although that included transporting the astronauts back to Earth. Objections had also been raised regarding the reality TV project associated with the expedition. Given the transient nature of most reality TV ventures, many believed that as viewership declined, funding could significantly decrease, thereby harming the entire expedition. Further, contestants reported that they were ranked based on their donations and funds raised.

=== Academia ===
John Logsdon, a space policy expert at George Washington University, criticized the program, saying it appeared to be a scam and not "a credible proposition".

Chris Welch, director of the Masters Programs at the International Space University, said "Even ignoring the potential mismatch between the project income and its costs and questions about its longer-term viability, the Mars One proposal does not demonstrate a sufficiently deep understanding of the problems to give real confidence that the project would be able to meet its very ambitious schedule."

Gerard 't Hooft, theoretical physicist and Mars One ambassador, has stated that he thought both their proposed schedule and budget were off by a factor of ten. He said he still supported the project's overall goals.

A space logistics analysis conducted by PhD candidates at the Massachusetts Institute of Technology (MIT) revealed that the most optimistic of scenarios would require 15 Falcon Heavy launches that would cost approximately $4.5 billion. They concluded that the reliability of Environmental Control and Life Support systems (ECLS), the Technology Readiness Levels (TRL), and in situ resource utilization (ISRU) would have to be improved. Additionally, they determined that if the costs of launch were also lowered dramatically, together this would help to reduce the mass and cost of Mars settlement architecture. The environmental system would result in failure to be able to support human life in 68 days if fire safety standards on over-oxygenation were followed, due to excessive use of nitrogen supplies that would not then be able to be used to compensate for leakage of air out of the habitat, leading to a resultant loss in pressurization, ending with pressures too low to support human life. Lansdorp replied that although he has not read all the research, supplier Lockheed Martin said that the technologies were viable.

Another serious concern uncovered in the research conducted by MIT was replacement parts. MIT PhD candidates estimated the need for spare parts in a Mars colony based on the failure rates of parts on the International Space Station. They determined that a resupply mission every two years would be necessary unless a large space in the initial launch were to be reserved for extra materials. Lansdorp commented on this saying, "They are correct. The major challenge of Mars One is keeping everything up and running. We don't believe what we have designed is the best solution. It's a good solution."

In March 2015, one of the Mars One finalists, Joseph Roche, stated to media outlets that he believed the mission to be a scam. Roche holds doctorate degrees in physics and astrophysics, and shared many of his concerns and criticisms of the mission. These claims include that the organization lied about the number of applicants, stating that 200,000 individuals applied versus Roche's claim of 2,761, and that many of the applicants had paid to be put on the list. Furthermore, Roche claimed that Mars One was asking finalists for donations from any money earned from guest appearances (which would amount to a minimal portion of the estimated $6 billion required for the mission). Finally, despite being one of 100 finalists, Roche himself never spoke to any Mars One employee or representative in person, and instead of psychological or psychometric testing as is normal for astronaut candidates (especially for a lengthy, one-way mission), his interview process consisted of a 10-minute Skype conversation.

=== Space advocacy and policy ===
Robert Zubrin, advocate for crewed Martian exploration, said "I don't think the business plan closes it. We're going to go to Mars, we need a billion dollars, and we're going to make up the revenue with advertising and media rights and so on. You might be able to make up some of the money that way, but I don't think that anyone who is interested in making money is going to invest on that basis – invest in this really risky proposition, and if you're lucky you'll break even? That doesn't fly." Despite his criticisms, Zubrin became an adviser to Mars One on 10 October 2013.

=== Astronauts ===
Canadian former astronaut Julie Payette said during the opening speech for an International Civil Aviation Organization conference that she did not think Mars One "is sending anybody anywhere".

In January 2014, German former astronaut Ulrich Walter strongly criticized the project for ethical reasons. Speaking with Tagesspiegel, he estimated the probability of reaching Mars alive at only 30%, and that of surviving there more than three months at less than 20%. He said, "They don't care what happens to those people in space... If my tax money were used for such a mission, I would organize a protest."

Space tourist Richard Garriott stated in response to Mars One, "Many have interesting viable starting plans. Few raise the money to be able to pull it off."

Former US astronaut Buzz Aldrin said in an interview that he wants to see humans on Mars by 2035, but he does not think Mars One will be the first to achieve it.

=== Publications ===
Wired magazine gave it a plausibility score of 2 out of 10 as part of their 2012 Most Audacious Private Space Exploration Plans.

The project lacked current funding as well as sources for future funding. The organization had no spacecraft or rocket in development or any contracts in place with companies that could provide a spacecraft or rocket. While plans point to SpaceX for both resources, the company had no contracts with Mars One in an industry that typically plans contracts decades in advance.

== See also ==
- Colonization of Mars
- Effect of spaceflight on the human body – Medical issues associated with spaceflight
- Health threat from cosmic rays – Cancer causing exposure to ionizing radiation in spaceflight
- Human spaceflight – Spaceflight with a crew or passengers
- Human mission to Mars – Proposed concepts
- Inspiration Mars Foundation – Defunct, proposed a crewed flyby mission
- SpaceX Mars transportation infrastructure – Proposed human Mars program by SpaceX
- MARS-500 – Psychosocial isolation experiment in spaceflight research
- Mars to Stay – Mars colonization architecture proposing no return vehicles
- NewSpace – Spaceflight not by a government
- Private spaceflight – Spaceflight not by a government
- Space medicine – Application of medicine during spaceflight
