= Pnina Moed Kass =

American writer

Pnina Moed Kass (born 1938) is a Belgian writer.

== Biography ==
Pnina Kass was born in Belgium and grew up in New York City. After studying political science and art history, she gained experience in the advertising and music industries. She taught high school English in the United States and later in Israel.

Her literary work includes short stories that have been published in newspapers, and anthologies, scripts, lyrics, storybook stories and the novel Real Time (2004).

The author lives near Tel Aviv.

== Works ==
- Stevie's Tricycle (1982)
- Tommy's New Bed (1984)
- Berele, a series in Hebrew (1980s)
- Real Time (German: Echtzeit) (2004)

== Awards ==
- International Reading Award for Best Young Adult Short Story
- 2005: National Jewish Book Award
- 2004: Sydney Taylor Book Award
