= Edward H. Kass =

American physician, medical school professor and researcher

Edward Harold Kass (December 20, 1917, New York City – January 17, 1990, Lincoln, Massachusetts) was an American physician, medical school professor, medical researcher in infectious diseases, medical journal editor, and historian of medicine. He is known for his research on toxic shock syndrome and urinary tract infections.

== Biography ==
His parents were Jewish emigrants from Russia to New York City. He grew up in Manhattan's Lower East Side, where his family struggled financially. Edward H. Kass was an outstanding student, skipped several grades in public school, and graduated from high school at age 15. He supported himself at City College of New York, and later after transferring to the University of Kentucky, by selling Fuller brushes door-to-door and by washing dishes in restaurants. At the University of Kentucky he graduated in 1939 with an A.B. and in 1941 with an M.S. in bacteriology. He married Fae Golden in 1943. He graduated from the University of Wisconsin–Madison with a Ph.D. in bacteriology in 1943. At the University of Wisconsin he worked in 1944 as an immunologist in the department of physical chemistry and in 1944–1945 as a graduate assistant in department of pathology. In 1947 he received his M.D. from the UCSF School of Medicine, where he was president of his graduating class.

From 1947 to 1949 he was an intern at the Boston City Hospital, where he was mentored by Maxwell Finland. Kass spent his career in Boston with a sabbatical year in 1974–1975 and with many lectures given at foreign medical schools. From 1949 to 1952 he was a research fellow at the Boston City Hospital. At Harvard Medical School he was an instructor from 1951 to 1952, an associate from 1952 to 1955, an assistant professor from 1955 to 1958, an associate professor from 1958 to 1969, a full professor from 1969 to 1973, and William Ellery Channing Professor of Medicine from 1973 until he retired due to his final illness. From 1977 was the director of Harvard Medical School's Channing Laboratory, as well as a physician at Peter Bent Brigham Hospital, which in 1980 was merged into Brigham and Women's Hospital.

In 1963 Kass was a founding member, as well as secretary and treasurer, of the Infectious Diseases Society of America (IDSA). In 1970 he was the president of the IDSA. In October 1970 he gave the IDSA presidential address. From 1967 to 1977 he was the editor-in-chief of the Journal of Infectious Diseases. In 1979 he became the editor-in-chief of a new journal, Reviews of Infectious Diseases, which he edited until 1989, shortly before his death. (In 1992 the journal was renamed Clinical Infectious Diseases.)

Kass did a great deal of committee work and served as a consultant to many Boston hospitals. He chaired from 1971 to 1973 the committee in space medicine of the National Academy of Sciences, served on the editorial boards of eight medical journals, and received a variety of honors.

In the mid 1970s he established the Fae Golden Kass Lectureship in honor of his first wife, who died in 1973. The Lectureship is sponsored jointly by Harvard Medical School and the Radcliffe Institute for Advanced Study at Harvard University. For the academic year 1974–1975 he was a Macy Faculty Scholar in Sir Richard Doll's department in the University of Oxford. At Oxford, Kass started writing a biography of the physician Thomas Hodgkin and was given access to the family papers by Hodgkin's descendants.

In 1975 Kass married his second wife, Amalie Moses Hecht Kass. He had three children from his first marriage and five stepchildren from his second marriage.

In 1988 Harcourt Brace Jovanovich published a biography of the physician Thomas Hodgkin by Amalie and Edward Kass.

Lawrence P. Garrod wrote that Edward H. Kass and Thomas A. Stamey (1928–2015) in the U.S.A. and William Ross Cattell (1928–2020), Francis William O'Grady (1925–2015), and William Brumfitt (1927–2020) in the U.K. were leading experts in the medical speciality of urology.

Kass received in 1958 an honorary M.A. from Harvard and in 1962 an honorary D.Sc. from the University of Kentucky. He was elected in 1962 a member of the American Academy of Arts and Sciences and in 1982 a Fellow of the Royal College of Physicians.

Dr. Kass died from lung cancer, although he was a non-smoker. Not long before his death he launched a project to create a multi-volume Handbook of Infectious Diseases. Upon his death he was survived by two sons, Robert and James, a daughter, Nancy, four grandchildren, as well as his second wife and his stepchildren.

As a memorial, the Infectious Diseases Society of America established the annual Edward H. Kass Lectureship.

== Selected publications ==
- Kass, Edward H.; Schneiderman, Lawrence J. (1957). "Entry of Bacteria into the Urinary Tracts of Patients with Inlying Catheters". New England Journal of Medicine. 256 (12): 556–557. doi:10.1056/NEJM195703212561206. PMID 13419041.
- MacDonald, Richard A.; Levitin, Howard; Mallory, G. Kenneth; Kass, Edward H.; Norton, Joanne C. (1957). "Relation between Pyelonephritis and Bacterial Counts in the Urine". New England Journal of Medicine. 256 (20): 915–922. doi:10.1056/NEJM195705162562001. PMID 13451967.
- Kass, Edward H. (1957). "Bacteriuria and the Diagnosis of Infections of the Urinary Tract". A.M.A. Archives of Internal Medicine. 100 (5): 709–714. doi:10.1001/archinte.1957.00260110025004. PMID 13468815.
- Bodel, Phyllis T.; Cotran, Ramzi; Kass, Edward H. (December 1959). "Cranberry juice and the antibacterial action of hippuric acid". The Journal of Laboratory and Clinical Medicine. 54 (6): 881–888. PMID 13801916.
- Kass, Edward H. (1960). "Bacteriuria and Pyelonephritis of Pregnancy". Archives of Internal Medicine. 105 (2): 194–198. doi:10.1001/archinte.1960.00270140016003. PMID 14404662.
- Laurenzi, Gustave A.; Potter, Robert T.; Kass, Edward H. (1961). "Bacteriologic Flora of the Lower Respiratory Tract". New England Journal of Medicine. 265 (26): 1273–1278. doi:10.1056/NEJM196112282652601. PMID 14462856.
- Thrupp, Lauri D.; Cotran, Ramzi S.; Kass, Edward H. (1964). "Relationship of Bacteriuria in Pregnancy to Pyelonephritis". JAMA. 189 (12): 899–902. doi:10.1001/jama.1964.03070120021005. PMID 14172903.
- Green, Gareth M.; Kass, Edward H. (1964). "The Role of the Alveolar Macrophage in the Clearance of Bacteria from the Lung". Journal of Experimental Medicine. 119 (1): 167–176. doi:10.1084/jem.119.1.167. PMC 2137807. PMID 14113111.
- Pometta, D.; Rees, S. B.; Younger, D.; Kass, E. H. (1967). "Asymptomatic Bacteriuria in Diabetes Mellitus". New England Journal of Medicine. 276 (20): 1118–1121. doi:10.1056/NEJM196705182762004. PMID 6024166.
- Collins, Richard N.; Braun, Peter A.; Zinner, Stephen H.; Kass, Edward H. (1968). "Risk of Local and Systemic Infection with Polyethylene Intravenous Catheters". New England Journal of Medicine. 279 (7): 340–343. doi:10.1056/NEJM196808152790702. PMID 4969435.
- Wilfert, James N.; Barrett, Fred F.; Kass, Edward H. (1968). "Bacteremia Due to Serratia marcescens". New England Journal of Medicine. 279 (6): 286–289. doi:10.1056/NEJM196808082790604. PMID 4873219. (See Serratia marcescens.)
- Mathews-Roth, Micheline M.; Pathak, Madhu A.; Fitzpatrick, Thomas B.; Harber, Leonard C.; Kass, Edward H. (1970). "Beta-Carotene as a Photoprotective Agent in Erythropoietic Protoporphyria". New England Journal of Medicine. 282 (22): 1231–1234. doi:10.1056/NEJM197005282822204. PMID 5442632.
- Elder, H.A.; Santamarina, B.A.G.; Smith, S.; Kass, E.H. (1971). "The natural history of asymptomatic bacteriuria during pregnancy: The effect of tetracycline on the clinical course and the outcome of pregnancy". American Journal of Obstetrics and Gynecology. 111 (3): 441–462. doi:10.1016/0002-9378(71)90793-9. PMID 4937729.
- Braun, Peter; Lee, Yhu-Hsiung; Klein, Jerome O.; Marcy, S. Michael; Klein, Thomas A.; Charles, David; Levy, Paul; Kass, Edward H. (1971). "Birth Weight and Genital Mycoplasmas in Pregnancy". New England Journal of Medicine. 284 (4): 167–171. doi:10.1056/NEJM197101282840401. PMID 5539184.
- Zinner, Stephen H.; Levy, Paul S.; Kass, Edward H. (1971). "Familial Aggregation of Blood Pressure in Childhood". New England Journal of Medicine. 284 (8): 401–404. doi:10.1056/NEJM197102252840801. PMID 5540477.
- Mathews-Roth, M.M.; Pathak, M.A.; Parrish, J.; Fitzpatrick, T.B.; Kass, E.H.; Toda, K.; Clemens, W. (1972). "A Clinical Trial of the Effects of Oral Beta-Carotene on the Responses of Human Skin to Solar Radiation". Journal of Investigative Dermatology. 59 (4): 349–353. doi:10.1111/1523-1747.ep12627408. PMID 4569104.
- McCormack, William M.; Braun, Peter; Lee, Yhu-Hsiung; Klein, Jerome O.; Kass, Edward H. (1973). "The Genital Mycoplasmas". New England Journal of Medicine. 288 (2): 78–89. doi:10.1056/NEJM197301112880206. PMID 4564908.
- Mathews-Roth, Micheline M.; et al. (including E. H. Kass) (1974). "β-Carotene as an Oral Photoprotective Agent in Erythropoietic Protoporphyria". JAMA: The Journal of the American Medical Association. 228 (8): 1004. doi:10.1001/jama.1974.03230330034017.
- Sacks, Frank M.; Castelli, William P.; Donner, Allen; Kass, Edward H. (1975). "Plasma Lipids and Lipoproteins in Vegetarians and Controls". New England Journal of Medicine. 292 (22): 1148–1151. doi:10.1056/NEJM197505292922203. PMID 164628.
- Shurin, Paul A.; Alpert, Susan; Rosner, Bernard; Driscoll, Shirley G.; Lee, Yhu-Hsiung; McCormack, William M.; Santamarina, Bernardo A.G.; Kass, Edward H. (1975). "Chorioamnionitis and Colonization of the Newborn Infant with Genital Mycoplasmas". New England Journal of Medicine. 293 (1): 5–8. doi:10.1056/NEJM197507032930102. PMID 1168854.
- Warren, John W.; Platt, Richard; Thomas, Robert J.; Rosner, Bernard; Kass, Edward H. (1978). "Antibiotic Irrigation and Catheter-Associated Urinary-Tract Infections". New England Journal of Medicine. 299 (11): 570–573. doi:10.1056/NEJM197809142991103. PMID 210379.
- Shapiro, Mervyn; Townsend, Timothy R.; Rosner, Bernard; Kass, Edward H. (1979). "Use of Antimicrobial Drugs in General Hospitals". New England Journal of Medicine. 301 (7): 351–355. doi:10.1056/NEJM197908163010703. PMID 460323.
- Sacks, Frank M.; Donner, A.; Castelli, W. P.; Gronemeyer, J.; Pletka, P.; Margolius, H. S.; Landsberg, L.; Kass, E. H. (1981). "Effect of Ingestion of Meat on Plasma Cholesterol of Vegetarians". JAMA: The Journal of the American Medical Association. 246 (6): 640–644. doi:10.1001/jama.1981.03320060042020. PMID 7019459.
- Hypertension Detection Follow-up Program Cooperative Group (1982). "The Effect of Treatment on Mortality in Mild Hypertension". New England Journal of Medicine. 307 (16): 976–980. doi:10.1056/NEJM198210143071603. PMID 7110301.
- Sacks, Frank M.; Ornish, Dean; Rosner, Bernard; McLanahan, Sandra; Castelli, William P.; Kass, Edward H. (1985). "Plasma Lipoprotein Levels in Vegetarians". JAMA. 254 (10): 1337. doi:10.1001/jama.1985.03360100087019.
- Sacks, F. M.; Kass, E. H. (1988). "Low blood pressure in vegetarians: Effects of specific foods and nutrients". The American Journal of Clinical Nutrition. 48 (3): 795–800. doi:10.1093/ajcn/48.3.795. PMID 3414588.
- Shulman, Neil; et al. (including E. H. Kass) (1988). "Persistence of Reduction in Blood Pressure and Mortality of Participants in the Hypertension Detection and Follow-up Program". JAMA: The Journal of the American Medical Association. 259 (14): 2113. doi:10.1001/jama.1988.03720140033030.
- Mittendorf, R.; Williams, M. A.; Kass, E. H. (1992). "Prevention of Preterm Delivery and Low Birth Weight Associated with Asymptomatic Bacteriuria". Clinical Infectious Diseases. 14 (4): 927–932. doi:10.1093/clinids/14.4.927. PMID 1533541.
- Kass, Edward H. (2002). "Asymptomatic infections of the urinary tract". Journal of Urology. 167 (2 Part 2): 1016–1020. doi:10.1016/S0022-5347(02)80328-7. PMID 11905871. (reprint of 1956 article)
