= Expert Review of Anti-infective Therapy =

Medical journal

- Discipline: Infectious diseases
- Language: English

Publication details
- History: 2003-present
- Publisher: Informa
- Frequency: Monthly
- Impact factor: 3.767 (2019)

Standard abbreviations
- ISO 4: Expert Rev. Anti-infect. Ther.

Indexing
- CODEN: ERATCK
- ISSN: 1478-7210 (print); 1744-8336 (web)
- LCCN: 2004243346

Links
- Journal homepage; Online access; Online archive

Expert Review of Anti-infective Therapy is a monthly peer-reviewed medical journal publishing review articles and original papers on all aspects of anti-infective therapy. The journal was established in 2003 and is published by Informa.

== Abstracting and indexing ==
The journal is abstracted and indexed in:

- Academic OneFile
- BIOSIS Previews
- BIOSIS Reviews Reports and Meetings
- CAB Abstracts
- Chemical Abstracts
- CINAHL
- Current Contents/Clinical Medicine
- Global Health
- Embase
- Index Medicus/MEDLINE/PubMed
- Science Citation Index Expanded
- Scopus
- Tropical Diseases Bulletin

According to the Journal Citation Reports, the journal has a 2014 impact factor of 3.461, ranking it 61st out of 254 journals in the category "Pharmacology & Pharmacy".
