= Richard Kass =

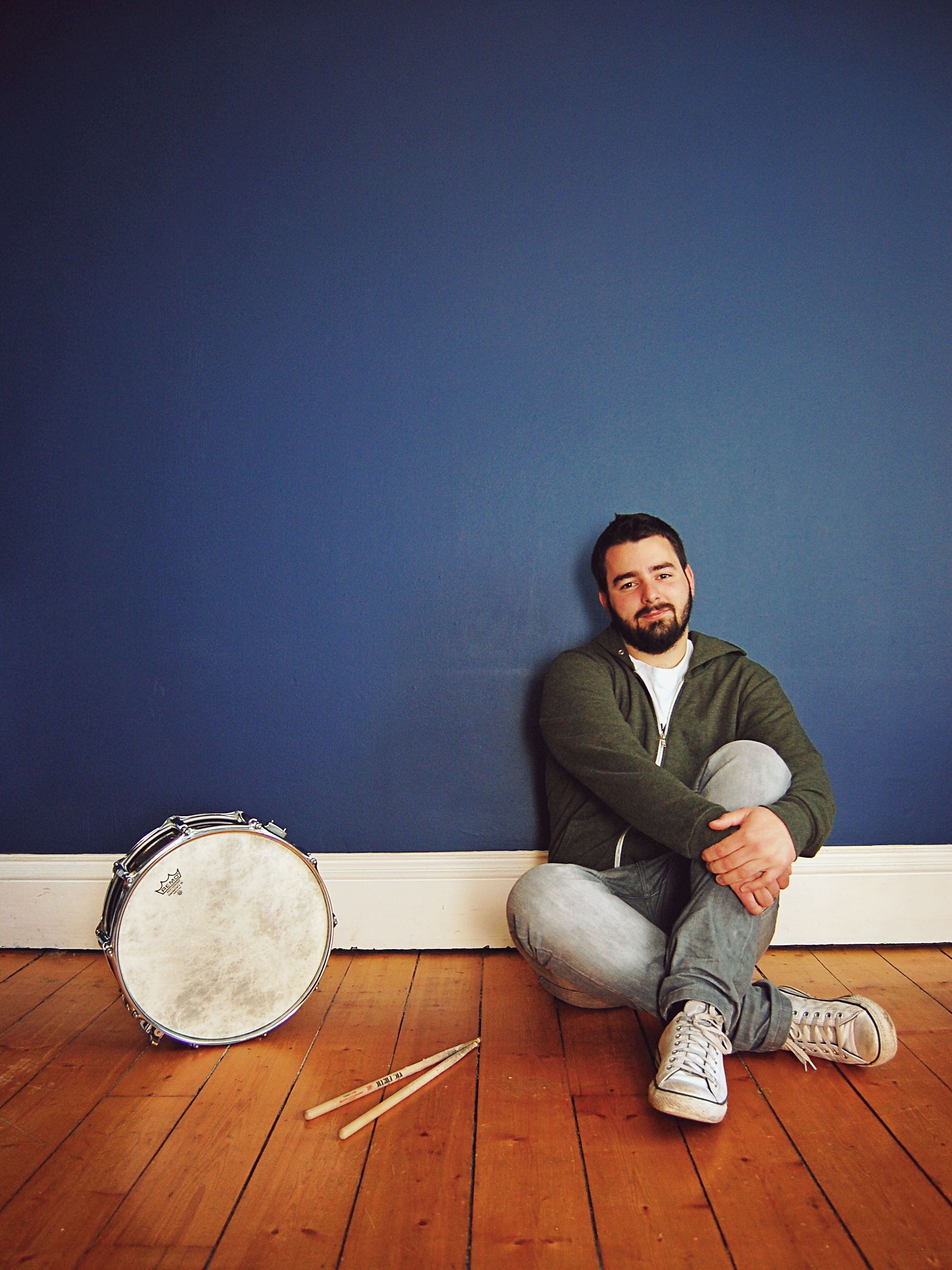
- Richard Kass

Background information
- Born: Inverness, Scotland
- Genres: Jazz, Contemporary Classical, Fusion
- Occupation: Musician
- Instrument: Drums
- Years active: 2000–present
- Website: www.richardkass.com

Richard Kass is a Scottish jazz drummer and educator.

== Early life ==
Kass was born in Inverness, Scotland, and he first became interested in the drum kit in high school, where he started playing in punk bands with his friends.

== Music career ==
Kass has worked with many high-profile artists including Cory Henry, Evelyn Glennie, Steve Lehman (composer), The Wanted, Sugababes, Somi, Grammy Nominee Muhsinah, Southern Tenant Folk Union, John Etheridge, Carrie Mac, Haftor Medboe Group and many more.

Kass is currently a full-time member of Trio HLK, Pthronk pioneers Thunkfish, electronica act Homework and the jazz fusion group The Discordian Trio.

Kass has been described as "a polyrhythmic monster" by Steve White and his playing has been cited as "stretching the bounds of rhythm and capabilities to new levels". He has also received equal praise for his playing in the electronica scene:

"Homework have to be seen live to appreciate how busy their drummer is. Close your eyes – there’s a rock-steady but nuanced groove; open them – his hands are all over the kit, leaving no tom or cymbal feeling lonely. To do this without sounding horribly overindulgent takes some skill and confidence."
