= Kristiina Kass =

Estonian children's writer (born 1970)

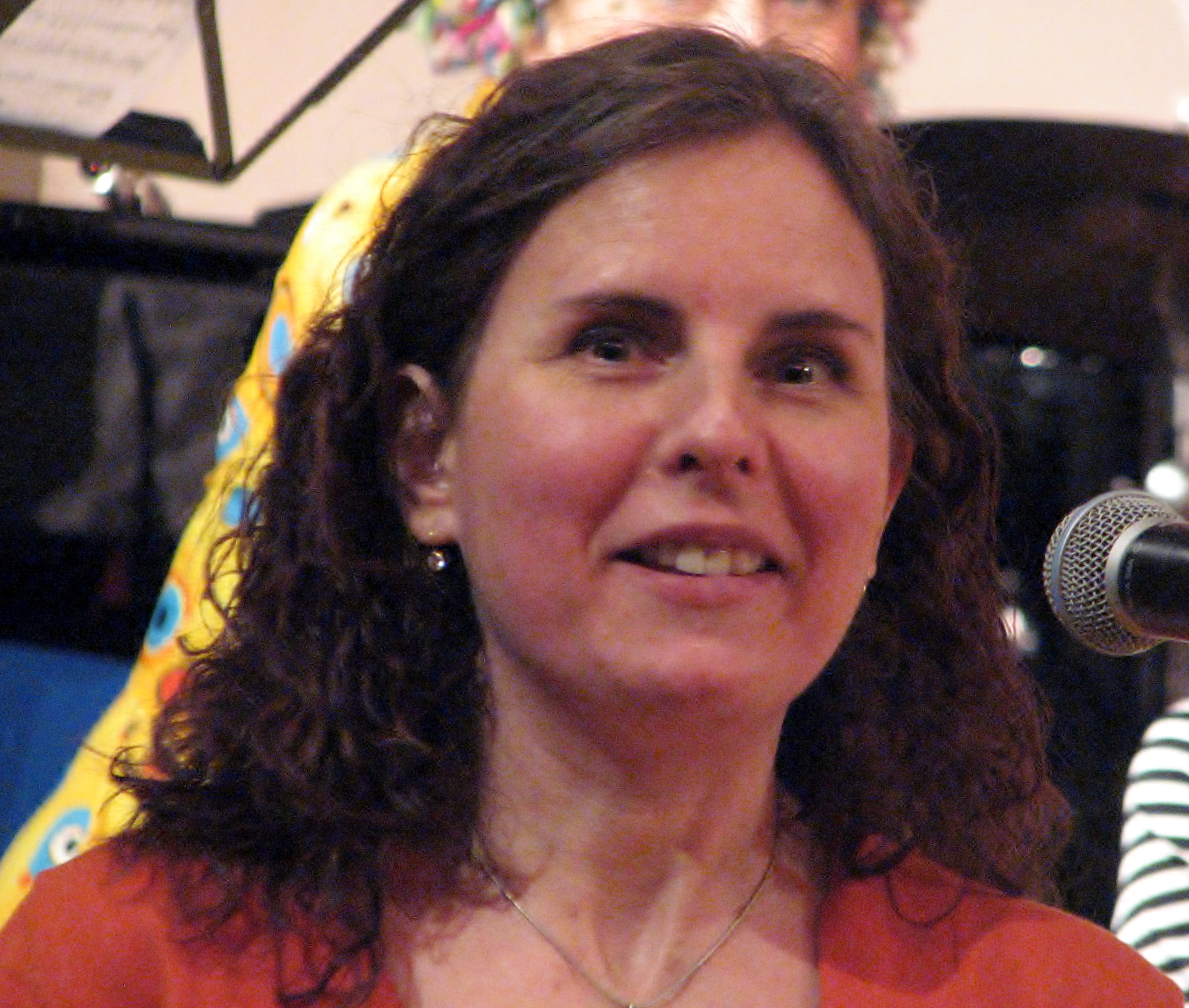
Kristiina Kass

Kristiina Kass (born 14 May 1970) is an Estonian children's writer and illustrator.

Kristiina Kass was born in Tartu. Her father is feuilletonist Kalju Kass and her mother is children's writer Asta Kass.

She studied Finnish language and culture at the University of Helsinki.

She lives in Finland.

== Works ==
She has written 12 children's books and five of which are illustrated by her.
