= David Kass (physician) =

American Physician-Scientist

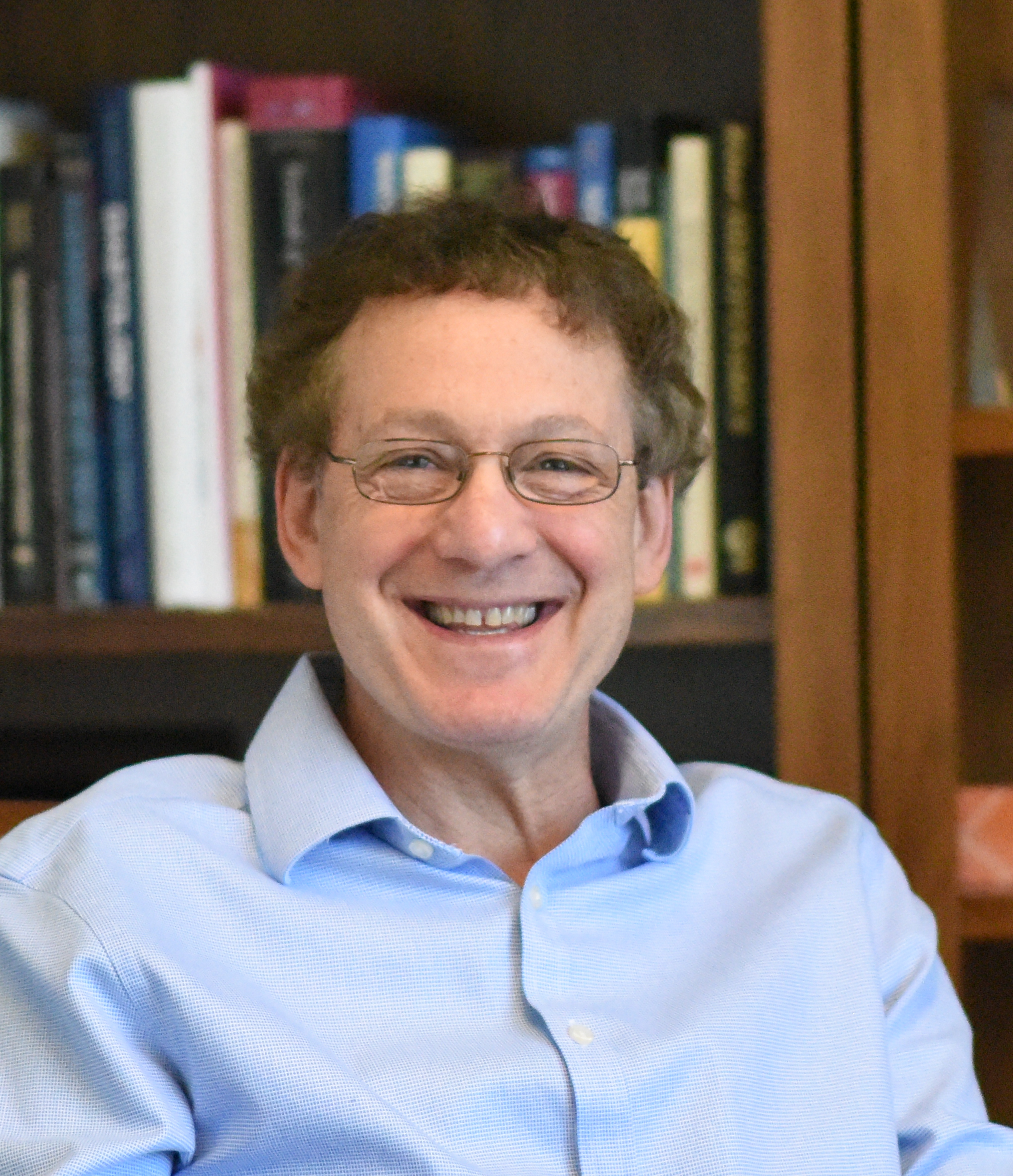
- Education: Harvard College (BA 1975); Yale University (MD 1980); George Washington University
- Known for: Pressure-volume analysis; Cardiac resynchronization therapy (CRT); Heart failure and cGMP/protein kinase G signaling
- Awards: Outstanding Investigator Award (National Institutes of Health, 2017 - 2023); Louis Artur Lucien Prize in Cardiovascular Diseases (2020); International Society of Heart Research Innovator Award (2020); Clinical Innovator and Mentor Award (Johns Hopkins University, 2017); Basic Science Research Prize (American Heart Association, 2008)
- Scientific career
- Workplaces: Johns Hopkins University
- Website: www.kasslab.johnshopkins.edu

David Kass, M.D. is the Abraham and Virginia Weiss Professor of Cardiology at Johns Hopkins University. He also serves as a Professor of Medicine, Pharmacology, Molecular Sciences, and Biomedical Engineering. He obtained a Bachelor of Arts degree from Harvard College in 1975, majoring in Applied Physics and Engineering, and a Doctor of Medicine degree from Yale University in 1980. Following his medical studies, he completed an Internal Medicine residency at George Washington University in Washington, DC before joining the Cardiology Division at Johns Hopkins University. Kass' research has ranged from fundamental molecular and cellular studies to human clinical research. His publication record includes over 550 original papers, with more than 55,000 citations.

Kass is the Director of the Institute of CardioScience and co-directs a post-doctoral NIH-training program in Cardiovascular Disease. He has received honors including awards from the American Heart Association. the Inaugural Janice Pfeffer Award from the International Society for Heart Research, and an Outstanding Investigator Award from the National Institutes of Health. In 2020, he received the Louis and Artur Lucien Prize in Cardiovascular Diseases and the Inaugural NAS-International Society of Heart Research Innovator Award. He received two Outstanding Investigator Awards from the National Heart Lung and Blood Institute in 2017 and 2023.

Kass is a member of professional societies such as the American Society for Clinical Investigation, American Heart Association, and Association of American Physicians. He has served on the editorial board for journals like Circulation Research and as an Associate Editor the American Journal of Physiology.

== Early career ==
Kass' first research work was during undergraduate studies in applied mathematics in the laboratory of Martin Moore-Ede, a circadian rhythm biologist at Harvard's Physiology Department. He merged understanding of bio-oscillatory mathematics with the biology of diurnal biological behavior, focusing on regulation of renal excretion of both sodium and potassium. Kass showed that the volume sensing mechanism, which was coupled to atrial stretch (later shown to relate to natriuretic peptide), was blunted during the nighttime by central circadian regulation.

Kass completed medical residency with the Internal Medicine Department at the George Washington University then a Fellowship in Cardiology at the Johns Hopkins University, working with Kiichi Sagawa in the Bioengineering Department in cardiac systemic engineering and mechanics pressure-volume relationships in the heart. Kass applied pressure-volume analysis to the intact mouse heart in situ and shortly thereafter in human patients, advancing the understanding of cardiac disease pathophysiology. His work established the factors regulating pressure-volume relations in the intact heart and in particular its maximal elastance, an index of contractility, and the role of external constraints on measures of diastolic function.

In the latter 1990’s Kass began research into applying pacing stimuli to both sides of a failing heart. This approach was later called cardiac resynchronization therapy (CRT). His work showed that with CRT net systolic function was enhanced without commensurate increases in oxygen consumption, that is, the heart became more mechanically efficient. He also showed how to predict which patients were most likely to benefit from the treatment.

Kass also explored a canine model of heart failure with dyssynchronous contraction and studied cellular and molecular mechanisms relevant to the improvement from resynchronizing contraction. Among the studies from this work was the discovery of how CRT altered adrenergic signaling to improve contractile reserve, and improved sarcomere force-calcium dependence.

Kass later developed a novel pacing therapy for heart failure where a normally contracting heart (not affected by a conduction delay to induce dyssynchrony) could be treated by temporarily making it contract dyssynchronously by means of right ventricular pacing, but then restored to normal contraction within 6 hours. The approach improved failing canine heart function, adrenergic signaling, and contractile function at the sarcomere level.

== Major contributions to cardiology ==
While the Kass Laboratory was exploring the mechanisms for CRT, he discovered that a relative of nitric oxide (NO), termed nitroxyl (HNO), conferred positive contractile changes differently from NO and could improve the function of the failing heart. This led to founding the pharmaceutical company Cardioxyl Inc., which developed room stable HNO donor molecules that were ultimately advanced to Phase II clinical trials. The company was acquired by Bristol Meyers Squibb in 2015.

In the early 2000s, Kass began to incorporate molecular and cellular biology along with traditional bioengineering to better study heart failure mechanisms and novel therapies. The lab discovered that inhibiting phosphodiesterase type 5A(PDE5A), which degraded Cyclic guanosine monophosphate(cGMP) and was inhibited by the drug sildenafil (Viagra®), blunted heart contractility from adrenergic stimuli in animal and human hearts, and when chronically administered to animals, it improved their heart function and heart disease in response to pressure-stress. Subsequent studies identified various mechanisms underlying this benefit.

In 2015, the Kass lab found another phosphodiesterase that controls cGMP – PDE9A, showing that it specifically regulated cardiac signaling linked to natriuretic peptides. PDE9A was later reported by his laboratory to stimulate fatty acid oxidation and lipolysis in fat and cardiac muscle, and improve disease related to diet-induced obesity and cardiometabolic syndrome. Kass's lab linked cGMP regulation to control of the mechanistic target of rapamycin to control abnormal heart growth and protein quality control, and this was later translated to an immune therapy for cancer.

== Ongoing work ==
In the late 2010s and early 2020s, Kass' research has shifted towards investigating heart failure with preserved ejection fraction (HFpEF), with a focus on the role of obesity and metabolic defects in this condition. His laboratory has reported the first human data from heart muscle detailing abnormalities in gene transcription, metabolism, and muscle sarcomere function.

Kass' research team includes clinicians, physician-scientists, graduate and undergraduate students. His research has and continues to be supported by the National Institutes of Health, American Heart Association, and Leducq Foundation.
