= Infectious Diseases Society of America =

Medical association

- Formation: 1963; 63 years ago
- Type: Professional association
- Headquarters: Arlington, Virginia
- Location: United States
- Members: 13,800 as of 2024
- President: Ronald G. Nahass, MD, MHCM, FIDSA
- President-Elect: Wendy S. Armstrong, MD, FIDSA
- Website: www.idsociety.org

The Infectious Diseases Society of America (IDSA) is a medical association representing physicians, scientists, and other health care professionals who specialize in infectious diseases. It was founded in 1963 and is based in Arlington, Virginia. As of 2023, IDSA had more than 13,000 members from across the United States and nearly 100 other countries on six different continents. IDSA's purpose is to improve the health of individuals, communities, and society by promoting excellence in patient care, education, research, public health, and prevention relating to infectious diseases. It is a 501(c)(6) organization.

== History ==
The IDSA was formed from two different groups. Jay P. Sanford and a group that included members of the American Federation for Clinical Research, American Society for Clinical Investigation, and the Association of American Physicians met each spring in Atlantic City, New Jersey, to discuss infectious disease topics. Another group formed from the American Society for Microbiology's (ASM) antibiotics meetings discussed advances in antimicrobial therapy and proposed a new dinner group to discuss other topics related to infectious diseases. In 1962, Maxwell Finland, the president of ASM, expressed interest in forming an infectious diseases division within the ASM. Dr. Finland formed a planning committee. Lowell A. Rantz, MD, chaired the committee with Edward H. Kass, MS, PhD, MD, as the secretary. The committee decided to create an organization independent of ASM. In October 1963, the committee met in Warrenton, Virginia, with 125 charter members and guests. Rantz was elected as president, but he nominated Finland instead, and Kass served as secretary and treasurer.

== Publications and activities ==
IDSA publishes the following medical journals:

- Clinical Infectious Diseases (Clinical Infectious Diseases | Oxford Academic)
- The Journal of Infectious Diseases (The Journal of Infectious Diseases | Oxford Academic)
- Open Forum Infectious Diseases (Open Forum Infectious Diseases | Oxford Academic)

The IDSA holds an annual meeting featuring presentations by experts in various aspects of infectious diseases, as well as original research abstracts and panel discussions. The IDSA also issues clinical practice guidelines, advocates the development of new antimicrobial drugs and attention to the problem of antibiotic resistance, and promotes the scientific study of vaccination and access to important childhood vaccines. The Society sponsors the HIV Medicine Association (HIVMA), an organization of HIV researchers and specialists, and funds research fellowships for junior investigators in infectious diseases. With the support of a CDC grant IDSA entertains a listserv for infectious disease physicians called Emerging Infections Network. It allows members to check on unusual clinical events, a potentially emerging infectious disease by connecting members to the CDC and other public health investigators and it is capable of queries and surveys.

== IDWeek ==
IDWeek is the joint annual meeting of the Infectious Diseases Society of America (IDSA), the Society for Healthcare Epidemiology of America (SHEA), the HIV Medicine Association (HIVMA), and the Pediatric Infectious Diseases Society (PIDS). Conference programming highlights the latest updates and breakthroughs on prevention, diagnosis, and treatment of infections, including HIV and emerging pathogens. It is held each fall in a U.S. or Canadian city. IDWeek features over 100 sessions and symposia, including an opening plenary, seven named lectures, as well as a series of premeeting workshops dedicated to focused learning on infectious disease topics.

Specialized IDWeek events include IDBugBowl, a Jeopardy-style quiz game, the BugHub World Stage, a platform designed for sharing personal experiences related to infectious diseases, and IDBugCrawl, a student and resident-focused program that offers an introduction to the field of infectious diseases.

== IDSA Foundation ==
The IDSA Foundation, the 501(c)(3) charitable arm of the Infectious Diseases Society of America, serves as the Society's primary fundraising partner.

== Support for the Prevention and Public Health Fund ==
On November 3, 2017, the U.S. House passed a bill, H.R. 3922 (the "CHAMPIONING Healthy Kids Act") that cuts $6.35 billion from the Prevention and Public Health Fund (PPHF). Paul Auwaerter, then-president of IDSA, said that the cut would hurt both public health and national security. The PPHF fund comprises over 12 percent of the budget of the Centers for Disease Control and Prevention (CDC). Auwaerter said, "…a significant cut to the fund will have a very troubling impact on CDC efforts to prevent infections and respond to outbreaks in communities and health care settings."

The PPHF was created under the Affordable Care Act to fund programs for prevention and public health activities. The fund supports programs that prevent, monitor, and respond to infectious diseases, including immunization programs; responses to outbreaks of "vaccine-preventable illnesses"; adult immunization registries; managing emerging health issues such as food-borne infection outbreaks and waterborne diseases; and programs that support Alzheimer's, diabetes, heart disease, and stroke prevention strategies.

Several organizations such as the American Heart Association and American Lung Association joined the IDSA in opposing the cuts.

== Combatting antimicrobial resistance ==
The World Health Organization has identified antimicrobial resistance as one of the three greatest threats to human health. IDSA has identified antimicrobial resistance as a priority for the organization.

In 2010, IDSA launched the 10 x '20 Initiative, which seeks a global commitment to create an antibiotic research and development enterprise powerful enough to produce 10 new systemic antibiotics by the year 2020. The initiative was launched as a response to the growing problem of antibiotic resistance and the lack of development of new antibiotics.

According to IDSA, new antibiotic development has slowed to a standstill due to market failure and regulatory disincentives. Antibiotics are not as profitable as other drugs (e.g., drugs to treat chronic conditions such as diabetes or asthma, which patients take for years). Also, the U.S. Food and Drug Administration (FDA) has long delayed publishing workable guidance describing how companies should design antibiotic clinical trials. Moreover, once a new antibiotic makes it to market, physicians hold it in reserve for only the worst cases rather than rushing to use it on all their patients due to fear of drug resistance. These economic and regulatory disincentives have made it far too difficult for companies to continue developing new antibiotics. It is estimated that the cost to the U.S. health care system of antibiotic resistant infections is $21 billion to $34 billion each year and more than 8 million additional hospital days.

On May 1, 2011, IDSA published a policy paper titled "Combating Antimicrobial Resistance: Policy Recommendations to Save Lives" in Clinical Infectious Diseases. The paper detailed the organization's recommendations for specific public policy strategies and research activities needed to promote the best interests of patients and health care professionals. Specifically, the paper urged creation of incentives to support antibiotic research and development; new rapid diagnostic tests to more quickly diagnose patients; greater coordination of government agencies to support surveillance, data collection, research, and prevention and control; and aggressive promotion of the judicious use of currently available antibiotics. IDSA's policy paper also proposed the creation of an Antimicrobial Innovation and Conservation (AIC) Fee that would help pay for antibiotic R&D and stewardship efforts necessary to make progress against antibiotic resistance.

Throughout 2012, IDSA garnered support of several medical organizations and pharmaceutical companies for a new FDA approval pathway, called the Limited Population Antibacterial Drug mechanism, to address an unmet medical need by speeding up development of antibiotics to treat patients who have serious infections for which therapeutic options are insufficient. The LPAD mechanism would allow for testing a drug's safety and effectiveness in smaller, shorter, and less expensive clinical trials, similar to the Orphan Drug Program.

In addition to the 10 x '20 Initiative, IDSA supports legislative and administrative efforts to strengthen the U.S. response to antimicrobial resistance, such as enhanced coordination and leadership, surveillance, prevention and control, and research efforts. IDSA also promotes the establishment of antimicrobial stewardship programs and integration of good stewardship practices in every health care facility across the United States and is working to eliminate inappropriate uses of antibiotics in food, animals and other aspects of agriculture.

In a followed up policy report released on April 17, 2013, titled "10 X '20 Progress – Development of New Drugs Active Against Gram-Negative Bacilli: An Update From the Infectious Diseases Society of America", IDSA expressed grave concern over the weak pipeline of antibiotics to combat the growing ability of bacteria, especially the Gram-negative bacilli (GNB), to develop resistance to antibiotics. Since 2009, only 2 new antibiotics were approved in United States, and the number of new antibiotics annually approved for marketing continues to decline. The report could identify only seven antibiotics currently in phase 2 or phase 3 clinical trials to treat the GNB which includes E. coli, Salmonella, Shigella and the Enterobacteriaceae bacteria, and these drugs do not address the entire spectrum of the resistance developed by those bacteria. Some of these seven new antibiotics are combination of existent antibiotics. There are positive signs that the governments and health authorities in US and Europe have recognized the urgency of the situation. Collaborations are formed between the regulatory bodies and pharmaceutical industry with funding and added incentives. The IDSA's prognosis for sustainable R&D infrastructure for antibiotics development will depend upon clarification of FDA regulatory clinical trial guidance which would facilitate the speedy approval of new drugs, and the appropriate economic incentives for the pharmaceuticals companies to invest in this endeavor.

In 2018, the IDSA put out a new statement about antibiotic research. Low financial returns on antibiotic research caused stock prices to go down, and companies had abandoned antibiotic research and development. In turn, this put pressure on the few remaining companies to deliver new antibiotics. The IDSA proposed that the government create incentives that reward and support private sector work toward a "robust, renewable antibiotic supply."

== Lyme disease treatment guidelines ==
Since 2000, IDSA has recommended against long-term antibiotic treatment for Lyme disease, finding that it is ineffective and potentially harmful. The American Academy of Neurology, Centers for Disease Control and Prevention, National Institutes of Health, and medical groups around the world similarly recommend against such treatment. However, a discredited view holds that chronic Lyme disease is responsible for a range of medically unexplained symptoms, mostly in people without any evidence of infection with Borrelia Burgdorferi, the bacterium that causes Lyme disease. Groups of patients and physicians who support the concept of chronic Lyme disease have organized to lobby for recognition of this diagnosis, as well as to argue for insurance coverage of long-term antibiotic therapy. Such groups have been critical of the IDSA guidelines on Lyme disease.

In 2006, Connecticut Attorney General Richard Blumenthal announced an antitrust investigation against the IDSA, accusing the authors of the 2006 IDSA Lyme disease guidelines of undisclosed conflicts of interest and of unduly dismissing alternative therapies and "chronic" Lyme disease. Blumenthal's investigation was closed on May 1, 2008, without charges when the IDSA agreed to submit its guidelines for review by a panel of independent scientists and physicians. Though it found no relevant conflicts of interests and stood behind its guidelines, IDSA cited mounting legal costs and the difficulty of presenting scientific arguments in a legal setting as their rationale for accepting the settlement. A Forbes piece described Blumenthal's investigation as "intimidation" of scientists by Blumenthal, an elected official with close ties to Lyme advocacy groups. The Journal of the American Medical Association described Blumenthal's investigation of the IDSA as an example of the "politicization of health policy" against the weight of scientific evidence, and voiced concern over a chilling effect on future decisions by medical associations.

Pursuant to their agreement with Blumenthal, the IDSA guidelines were reviewed by an independent panel subject to strict conflict-of-interest guidelines and vetted by a medical ethicist. The panel unanimously supported the original IDSA guidelines, finding that "chronic Lyme disease" and "post Lyme syndrome" lack clear definitions and convincing biological evidence. Further, the report emphasized that several prospective clinical trials of prolonged antibiotic therapy for persistently symptomatic patients uniformly showed evidence of harm without convincing evidence of benefit.
