= James R. Kass =

Canadian physicist

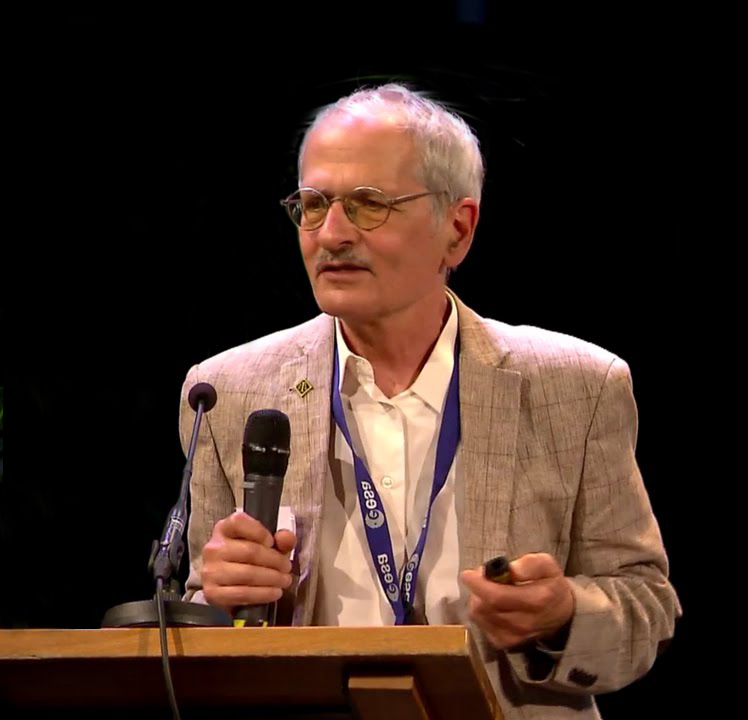
Dr James R. Kass. At Mars One's VIP event in Amsterdam, 3-June-2016, Dr. Kass talked about his extensive professional experience in human spaceflight.

James R. Kass is a Canadian physicist engaged in the field of human spaceflight.

== Biography ==
Kass holds a Bachelor of Science (BSc) in physics and mathematics (from Montreal) and a Master of Science (MS) in physics (from Ann Arbor, Michigan), and a Doctor of Philosophy (PhD) in physics from Leeds, England.

After he completed his PhD, Dr. Kass joined the Max-Planck Institute to conduct a research in Nuclear Physics. With a career of more than 30 years in human spaceflight, he worked as a scientist in the department of medicine at Joh.-Gutenberg University in Mainz, Germany, focussing on Neurophysiology and space medicine, particularly in the area of sensory perception. This work was carried out in conjunction with two Spacelab missions, Spacelab-1 and Spacelab-D1.

Kass started his circuitous route to human spaceflight at the height of the Space Age in 1962, when he registered at Sir George Williams University in Montreal attempting to commence studies in this domain. In the absence of a specific university program on space flight, he studied physics and mathematics, and proceeded to become a research fellow in nuclear physics. Eventually, he fulfilled his dream, when some 20 years later, he sat at the Johnson Spaceflight Centre (JSC) in Houston and directed the astronaut crew Ulf Merbold, Byron Lichtenberg, Robert Parker, and Skylab veteran Owen Garriott, to perform experiments in vestibular physiology prepared by a team of European investigators, of which he was a part.

Following this he worked for the aerospace industry in Bremen and Munich in the sectors of space operations, tele-medical research, artificial intelligence, and human behaviour, performing work in neutral buoyancy in parabolic flight, with the Mir station and on long-duration isolation missions. In 2000, he joined the European Space Agency (ESA) at their establishment in The Netherlands, ESTEC as senior scientist, where he worked on the STS-107 Spacehab/Space Shuttle mission. He has worked in the psychology of long-duration spaceflight, lecturing at University College London (UCL) (in England) and Concordia University (in Montreal, Quebec, Canada).

He has been involved in the fields of telemedicine and eHealth, being a member of the Telemedicine Alliance project, where he contributed to Data Privacy, and eSurveillance. He is an adviser on the Mars One project, and co-editted a book on this subject. Currently, he runs a space consultancy, and advises the European Commission on knowledge management, conducts training on sharing knowledge and lessons learned, and facilitates collaborations between the European Space Agency Business Applications program and industry. In the domain of Lessons Learned, he has been an invited speaker at the European Commission and interviewed on this subject. In the area of space safety, Dr. Kass has joined the board of the International Association for the Advancement of Space Safety (IAASS), serving as Development Manager.
