= The Journal of Infectious Diseases =

Peer-reviewed scientific journal

- Discipline: Infectious diseases
- Language: English
- Edited by: Cynthia Sears

Publication details
- History: 1904-present
- Publisher: Oxford University Press
- Frequency: Biweekly
- Open access: Hybrid
- Impact factor: 5.226 (2020)

Standard abbreviations
- ISO 4: J. Infect. Dis.

Indexing
- CODEN: JIDIAQ
- ISSN: 0022-1899 (print); 1537-6613 (web)
- LCCN: a40001288
- JSTOR: 00221899
- OCLC no.: 01754628

Links
- Journal homepage; Online archive

The Journal of Infectious Diseases is a peer-reviewed biweekly medical journal published by Oxford University Press on behalf of the Infectious Diseases Society of America. It covers research on the pathogenesis, diagnosis, and treatment of infectious diseases, on the microbes that cause them, and on immune system disorders. Cynthia Sears, an expert on gut infections, was appointed editor-in-chief in 2023.

The journal was established in 1904 and was a quarterly until 1969 when it became a monthly. In 2001, it began biweekly publication. From 1904 to 2011, the journal was published by the University of Chicago Press.

== Abstracting and indexing ==
The journal is abstracted and indexed in:

- Academic OneFile
- Academic Search
- BIOSIS Previews
- CAB Abstracts
- Chemical Abstracts
- CINAHL
- Current Contents/Clinical Medicine
- Elsevier Biobase
- Embase
- Global Health
- Current Contents/Life Sciences
- Index Medicus/MEDLINE/Pub Med
- Science Citation Index
- Scopus
- Tropical Diseases Bulletin

According to the Journal Citation Reports, the journal has a 2020 impact factor of 5.226.

== Past editors-in-chief ==
For volumes 1 through 226, the editors-in-chief were:

- 1904–1936 Ludvig Hektoen & Edwin O. Jordan (Volumes 1–59)
- 1937–1940 Ludvig Hektoen & William H. Taliaferro (Volumes 60–67)
- 1941–1957 William H. Taliaferro (Volumes 68–100)
- 1957–1960 William H. Taliaferro & James W. Moulder (Volumes 101–106)
- 1960–1968 James W. Moulder (Volumes 107–118)
- 1969–1979 Edward H. Kass (Volumes 119–139)
- 1979–1983 George Gee Jackson (Volumes 140–148)
- 1984–1988 Martha Dukes Yow (Volumes 149–158)
- 1989–2002 Marvin Turck (Volumes 159–186)
- 2003-2022 Martin S. Hirsch (Volumes 187-226)
