= Clinical Infectious Diseases =

- Discipline: Infectious diseases
- Language: English
- Edited by: Paul Sax

Publication details
- Former name(s): Reviews of Infectious Diseases
- History: 1979–present
- Publisher: Oxford University Press on behalf of the Infectious Diseases Society of America
- Frequency: Biweekly
- Impact factor: 20.999 (2021)

Standard abbreviations
- ISO 4: Clin. Infect. Dis.

Indexing
- CODEN: CIDIEL
- ISSN: 1058-4838 (print); 1537-6591 (web)
- OCLC no.: 24308833

Links
- Journal homepage

Clinical Infectious Diseases is a peer-reviewed medical journal published by Oxford University Press covering research on the pathogenesis, clinical investigation, medical microbiology, diagnosis, immune mechanisms, and treatment of diseases caused by infectious agents. It includes articles on antimicrobial resistance, bioterrorism, emerging infections, food safety, hospital epidemiology, and HIV/AIDS. It also features highly focused brief reports, review articles, editorials, commentaries, and supplements. The journal is published on behalf of the Infectious Diseases Society of America. The editor-in-chief is infectious disease physician Paul Sax.

According to the Journal Citation Reports, the journal had a 2020 impact factor of 9.079, ranking it 18th out of 162 journals in the category "Immunology", 3rd out of 92 journals in the category "Infectious Diseases" and 12th out of 137 journals in the category "Microbiology".

== Past editors ==
The following persons have been editor-in-chief:

- Reviews of Infectious Diseases
  - Edward H. Kass, 1979–1989
  - Sydney M. Finegold, 1990–1991
- Clinical Infectious Diseases
  - Sydney M. Finegold, 1992–1999
  - Sherwood L. Gorbach, 2000–2016
  - Robert T. Schooley, 2017–2022
