= Amalie Kass =

American historian (1928–2019)

- Born: Amalie Moses; January 9, 1928; Baltimore, Maryland, U.S.
- Died: May 19, 2019 (aged 91)
- Education: Wellesley College; Boston University
- Known for: Wrote about obstetrics and midwifery
- Spouse(s): Malcolm Hecht Jr. (m. 1949, died) Edward Kass (m. 1975)
- Children: 5
- Relatives: Alfred H. Moses (brother)
- Scientific career
- Fields: History
- Workplaces: Harvard Medical School

Amalie Moses Hecht Kass (born Amalie Moses; January 9, 1928 – May 19, 2019) was an American historian at Harvard Medical School. She wrote about obstetrics and midwifery.

== Biography ==
Amalie Moses was born on January 9, 1928, in Baltimore, Maryland, to Helene and Leslie Moses. She grew up in Baltimore and attended Forest Park High School. She attended Wellesley College and graduated in 1949, with high honors in history, and was a member of Phi Beta Kappa. She received her master's degree in education in 1963 from Boston University. She had two younger siblings, a brother Alfred H. Moses and a sister Claire Moses Lovett.

== Books and articles ==
=== Author of two medical biographies ===
1. Midwifery and Medicine in Boston: Walter Channing, M.D., 1786–1876, Northeastern University Press, 2002
2. Perfecting the World: The Life and Times of Thomas Hodgkin, MD (co-author with Edward Harold Kass), Harcourt Brace Jovanovitch, 1988

=== Author of numerous journal articles and encyclopedic entries including ===
1. A Brief History of the Channing Laboratory
2. My brother preaches, I practice Walter Channing, M.D., Antebellum Obstetrician
3. Walter Channing Brief life of a nineteenth-century obstetrician 1786-1876

== Professional work ==
- Associate editor, Journal of the History of Medicine and Allied Sciences (1996)
- Lecturer on the history of medicine, Harvard Medical School (1991)
- Research associate, Countway Library of Medicine, Harvard Medical School (1982)
- History teacher, Newton High School and Newton South High School (1963–1979)

== Major volunteer activities ==
- President of the Massachusetts Historical Society (2002 – ).
- Lincoln Rural Land Foundation Trustee (200? - present)
- Wellesley College Trustee (1992–2007)
- President of the Women's Institute for Housing and Economic Development

== Personal life ==
She married Malcolm "Mac" Hecht Jr. in 1949. They had five children. Her husband died. She married Edward Kass in 1975 and she became a stepmother to his three children. She lived in Lincoln, Massachusetts, and later lived in Belmont, Massachusetts. She died on May 19, 2019.

== Honors ==
- The Amalie Moses Kass Professorship of History of Medicine in the Department of Global Health and Social Medicine at Harvard Medical School
