= Multiculturalism in Canada =

Canadian social situation

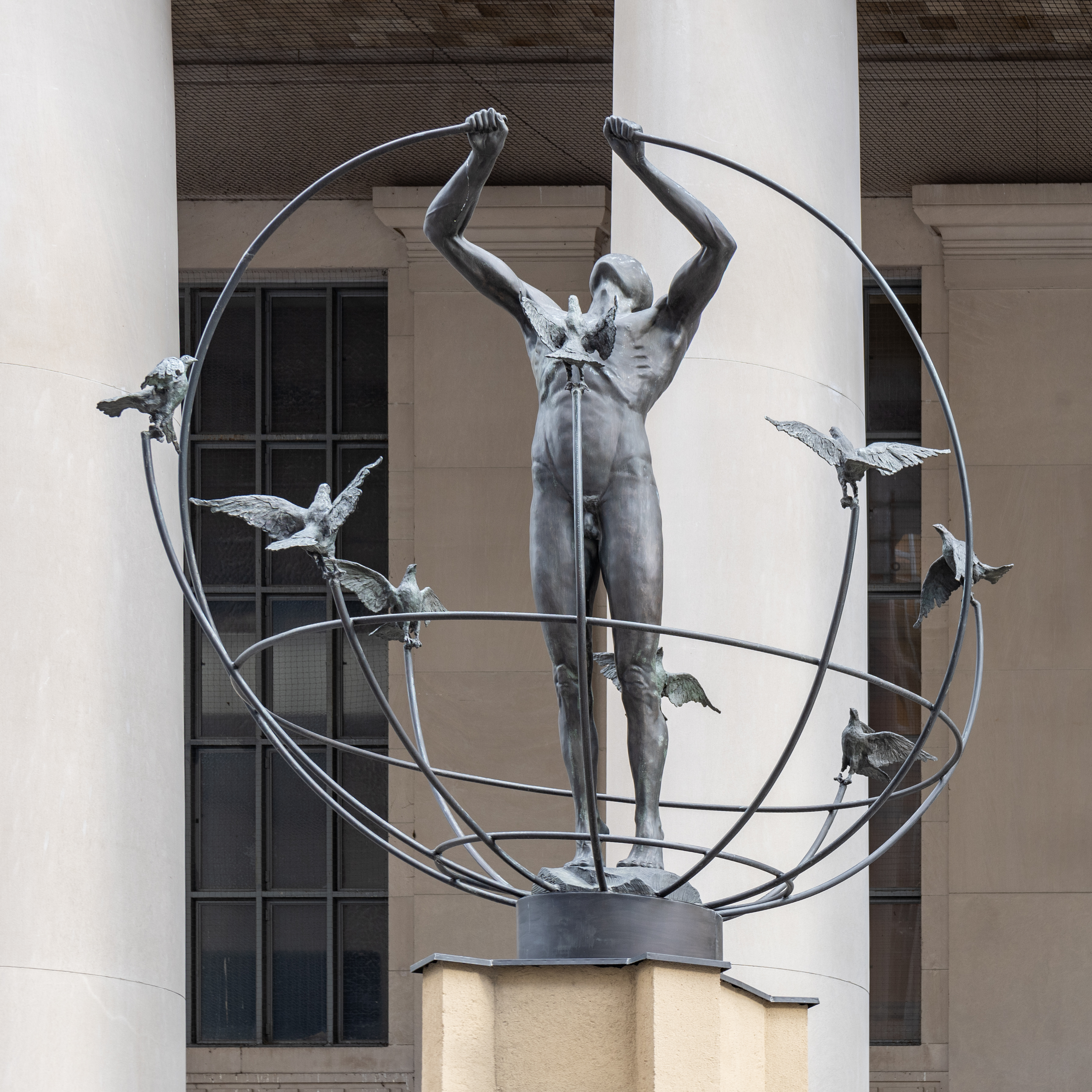
Monument to Multiculturalism by Francesco Pirelli, in Toronto

Multiculturalism in Canada was officially adopted by the government during the 1970s and 1980s. The Canadian federal government has been described as the instigator of multiculturalism as an ideology because of its public emphasis on the social importance of immigration. The 1960s Royal Commission on Bilingualism and Biculturalism is often referred to as the origin of modern political awareness of multiculturalism, resulting in Canada being one of the most multicultural nations in the world. The official state policy of multiculturalism is often cited as one of Canada's significant accomplishments, and a key distinguishing element of Canadian identity and Canadian values.

Multiculturalism is reflected with the law through the Canadian Multiculturalism Act of 1988 and section 27 of the Canadian Charter of Rights and Freedoms and is administered by the Department of Canadian Heritage. The Broadcasting Act of 1991 asserts the Canadian broadcasting system should reflect the diversity of cultures in the country. Despite the official policies, a small segment of the Canadian population are critical of the concept(s) of a cultural mosaic and implementation(s) of multiculturalism legislation. Quebec's ideology differs from that of the other provinces in that its official policies focus on interculturalism.

Canadians have used the term "multiculturalism" in different ways: descriptively (as a sociological fact), prescriptively (as ideology) or politically (as policy). In the first sense, "multiculturalism" describes the many different religious traditions and cultural influences that together form a Canadian cultural mosaic. The country consists of people from a multitude of racial, religious and cultural backgrounds and is, at least in principle, open to cultural pluralism. 92% of the Canadian population aged 15 and older agreed that ethnic or cultural diversity is a Canadian value. Notwithstanding, critics argue it promotes the ghettoization of ethnic communities and hinders a cohesive national identity, while acting as a superficial "song and dance" that masks the marginalization of visible minorities and Indigenous peoples.

== Historical context ==
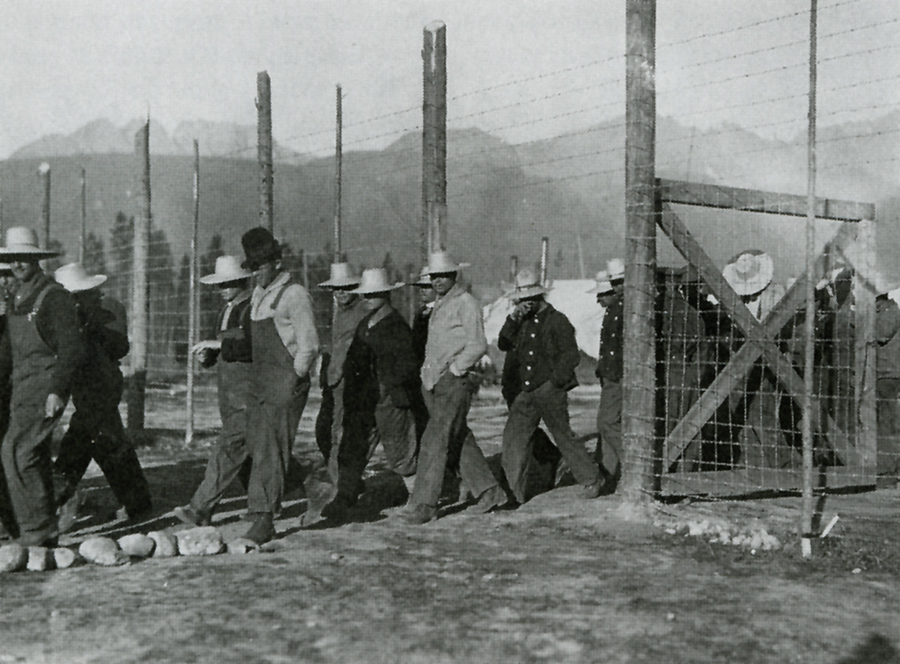
Castle Mountain Internment Camp held immigrant prisoners of Ukrainian, Austrian, Hungarian and German descent (1915).

In the 21st century Canada is often characterised as being "very progressive, diverse, and multicultural". However, Canada until the 1960s saw itself in terms of English and French cultural, linguistic and political identities, and to some extent indigenous. European immigrants speaking other languages, such as Canadians of German ethnicity and Ukrainian Canadians, were suspect, especially during the First World War when thousands were put in camps because they were citizens of enemy nations. Jewish Canadians were also suspect, especially in Quebec where anti-semitism was a factor and the Catholic Church of Quebec associated Jews with modernism, liberalism, and other unacceptable values.

Asians encountered legal obstacles limiting immigration during the 1800s and early 1900s. Additional, specific ethnic groups that did immigrate during this time faced barriers within Canada preventing full participation in political and social matters, including equal pay and the right to vote. While black ex-slave refugees from the United States had been tolerated, racial minorities of African or Asian origin were generally believed "beyond the pale" (not acceptable to most people). Although this mood started to shift dramatically during the Second World War, Japanese Canadians were interned during the overseas conflict and their property confiscated. Prior to the advent of the Canadian Bill of Rights in 1960 and its successor the Canadian Charter of Rights and Freedoms in 1982, the laws of Canada did not provide much in the way of civil rights and it was typically of limited concern to the courts. Since the 1960s, Canada has placed emphasis on equality and inclusiveness for all people.

=== Immigration ===
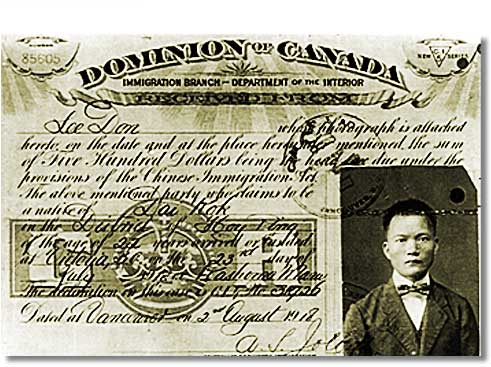
Head Tax Receipt - The head tax was introduced in 1885, as a means of controlling Chinese immigration.

Immigration has played an integral part in the development of multiculturalism within Canada during the last half of the 20th century. Legislative restrictions on immigration (such as the Continuous journey regulation and Chinese Immigration Act) that had favoured British, American and European immigrants were amended during the 1960s, resulting in an influx of diverse people from Asia, Africa and the Caribbean. By 2006 Canada had grown to have thirty four ethnic groups with at least one hundred thousand members each, of which eleven have over 1,000,000 people and numerous others are represented in smaller amounts. 16.2% of the population identify themselves as a visible minority.

Canada currently has one of the highest per capita immigration rate in the world, driven by economic policy and family reunification. Canada also resettles over one in ten of the world's refugees. In 2008, there were 65,567 immigrants in the family class, 21,860 refugees, and 149,072 economic immigrants amongst the 247,243 total immigrants to the country. Approximately 41% of Canadians are of either the first or second-generation. One out of every five Canadians currently living in Canada was born out of the country. The Canadian public as well as the major political parties support immigration. Political parties are cautious about criticizing the high level of immigration, because, as noted by The Globe and Mail, "in the early 1990s, the Reform Party" was branded 'racist' for suggesting that immigration levels be lowered from 250,000 to 150,000." The party was also noted for their opposition to government-sponsored multiculturalism.

=== Settlement ===
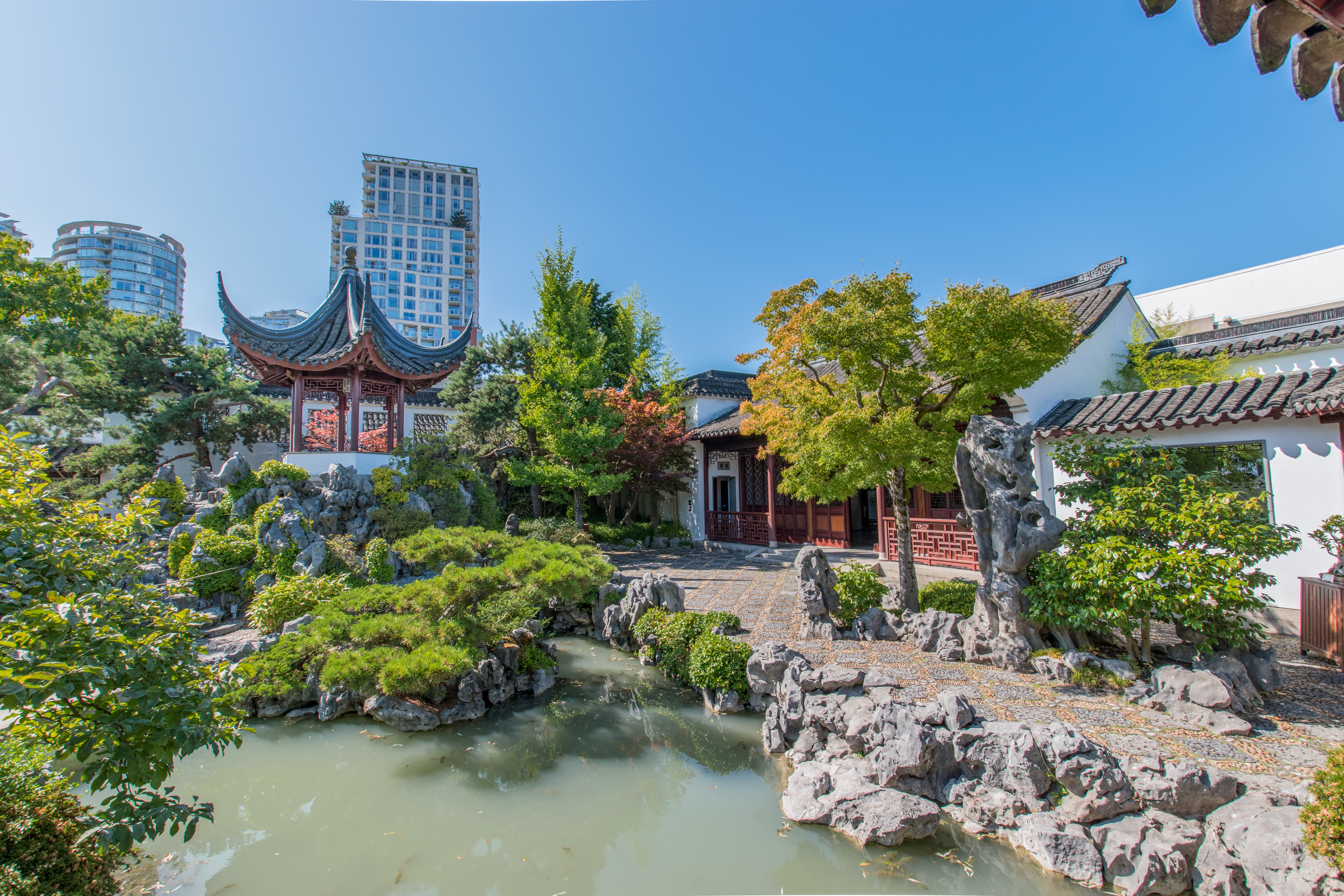
The Dr. Sun Yat-Sen Classical Chinese Garden in Vancouver's Chinatown is the first full-size Chinese or "scholars" garden built outside of China.

Culturally diverse areas or "ethnic enclaves" are another way in which multiculturalism has manifested. Newcomers have tended to settle in the major urban areas. Since the 1970s, Canada has seen a shift in immigrant sources from Europe to Asia, Africa, the Caribbean, and South America. Most recent immigrants belong to visible minority groups like Blacks, Chinese, and South Asians, primarily settling in Toronto, Montreal, and Vancouver. Between 1981 and 1996, the proportion of visible minorities grew significantly in these cities. By 1996, Toronto had 42% of the nation's visible minority population, while Montreal and Vancouver had 30%. Across the three metropolitan areas, recent immigrants (individuals who landed in Canada between 1996 and 2006) are more likely to live in enclaves, as well as individuals who are dedicated to the preservation of their culture.

Urban enclaves have served as a home away from home for immigrants to Canada, while providing a unique experience of different cultures for those of long Canadian descent. In Canada, there are several ethnocentric communities with many diverse backgrounds, including Chinese, Indian, Italian and Greek. Canadian Chinatowns are one of the most prolific type of ethnic enclave found in major cities. These areas seemingly recreate an authentic Chinese experience within an urban community. During the first half of the 20th century, Chinatowns were associated with filth, seediness, and the derelict. By the late 20th century, Chinatown(s) had become areas worth preserving, a tourist attraction. They are now generally valued for their cultural significance and have become a feature of most large Canadian cities. Professor John Zucchi of McGill University states:

Unlike earlier periods when significant ethnic segregation might imply a lack of integration and therefore be viewed as a social problem, nowadays ethnic concentration in residential areas is a sign of vitality and indicates that multiculturalism as a social policy has been successful, that ethnic groups are retaining their identities if they so wish, and old-world cultures are being preserved at the same time that ethnic groups are being integrated. In addition these neighbourhoods, like their cultures, add to the definition of a city and point to the fact that integration is a two-way street."

== Federal legislation ==
Analysts generally agree that federal multiculturalism policy has evolved through three developmental phases: the incipient stage (pre-1971), the formative period (1971–1981), and institutionalization (1982 to the present).

=== Incipient stage (pre-1971) ===
The Quebec Act, implemented after the British conquest of New France in the mid-1700s brought a large Francophone population under British Imperial rule, creating a need for accommodation. A century later the compromises made between the English and French speaking Fathers of Confederation set Canada on a path to bilingualism, and this in turn contributed to biculturalism and the acceptance of diversity. This culminated in 2006 with recognition that the Québécois form a nation within a united Canada.

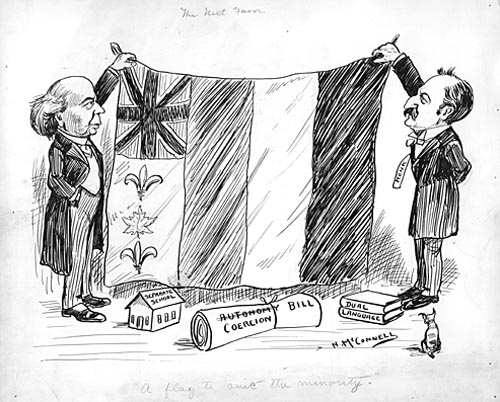
Political cartoon on Canada's bicultural identity showing a flag combining symbols of Britain, France and Canada, from 1911

The American writer Victoria Hayward in the 1922 book about her travels through Canada, described the cultural changes of the Canadian Prairies as a "mosaic". Another early use of the term mosaic to refer to Canadian society was by John Murray Gibbon, in his 1938 book Canadian Mosaic. The mosaic theme envisioned Canada as a "cultural mosaic" rather than a "melting pot".

Charles Hobart, a sociologist from the University of Alberta, and Lord Tweedsmuir, the 15th Governor General of Canada were early champions of the term multiculturalism. From his installation speech in 1935 onwards, Lord Tweedsmuir maintained in speeches and over the radio recited his ideas that ethnic groups "should retain their individuality and each make its contribution to the national character," and "the strongest nations are those that are made up of different racial elements." Adélard Godbout, while Premier of Quebec in 1943, published an article entitled "Canada: Unity in Diversity" in the Council on Foreign Relations journal discussing the influence of the Francophone population as a whole. The phrase "Unity in diversity" would be used frequently during Canadian multiculturalism debates in the proceeding decades.

The beginnings of the development of Canada's contemporary policy of multiculturalism can be traced to the Royal Commission on Bilingualism and Biculturalism, which was established on July 19, 1963 by the Liberal government of Prime Minister Lester B. Pearson in response to the grievances of Canada's French-speaking minority. The report of the Commission advocated that the Canadian government should recognize Canada as a bilingual and bicultural society and adopt policies to preserve this character.

The recommendations of the Royal Commission on Bilingualism and Biculturalism elicited a variety of responses. Former Progressive Conservative Prime Minister John Diefenbaker, (who was now Leader of the Official Opposition after his government was succeeded by that of Pearson on April 22, 1963), viewed them as an attack on his "One Canada Policy" that was opposed to extending accommodation to minority groups. The proposals also failed to satisfy those Francophones in the Province of Quebec who gravitated toward Québécois nationalism. More importantly, Canadians of neither English nor French descent (so-called "Third Force" Canadians) advocated that a policy of "multiculturalism" would better reflect the diverse heritage of Canada's peoples.

Paul Yuzyk, a Progressive Conservative Senator of Ukrainian descent, referred to Canada as "a multicultural nation" in his influential maiden speech in 1964, creating much national debate, and is remembered for his strong advocacy of the implementation of a multiculturalism policy and Social liberalism.

=== Formative period (1971–1981) ===
The Royal Commission on Bilingualism and Biculturalism report dealt with the contribution of non-Indigenous, non‑French and non-English ethnic groups to the cultural enrichment of Canada. The Commission recommended the "integration" (not assimilation) of citizens into Canadian society.

At the 1971 constitutional conference, the government of Alberta under Social Credit Premier Harry Strom demanded that multiculturalism be enshrined in any new constitutional settlement.

With this in mind, on October 8, 1971, the Liberal government of Prime Minister Pierre Elliot Trudeau announced in the House of Commons that, after much deliberation, the policies of bilingualism and multiculturalism would be implemented in Canada. The multiculturalism policy key objectives were:

- to assist cultural groups to retain and foster their identity;
- to assist cultural groups to overcome barriers to their full participation in Canadian society (thus, the multiculturalism policy advocated the full involvement and equal participation of ethnic minorities in mainstream institutions, without denying them the right to identify with select elements of their cultural past if they so chose);
- to promote creative exchanges among all Canadian cultural groups; and
- to assist immigrants in acquiring at least one of the two official languages

Trudeau espoused participatory democracy as a means of making Canada a "Just Society". He reiterated the Canadian government's support for "cultivation and use of many languages" at the 10th Congress of the Ukrainian Canadian Committee in Winnipeg, stating:

Uniformity is neither desirable nor possible in a country the size of Canada. We should not even be able to agree upon the kind of Canadian to choose as a model, let alone persuade most people to emulate it. There are few policies potentially more disastrous for Canada than to tell all Canadians that they must be alike. There is no such thing as a model or ideal Canadian. What could be more absurd than the concept of an “all-Canadian” boy or girl? A society which emphasizes uniformity is one which creates intolerance and hate. A society which eulogizes the average citizen is one which breeds mediocrity. What the world should be seeking, and what in Canada we must continue to cherish, are not concepts of uniformity but human values: compassion, love, and understanding.

=== Institutionalization (1982 to present) ===
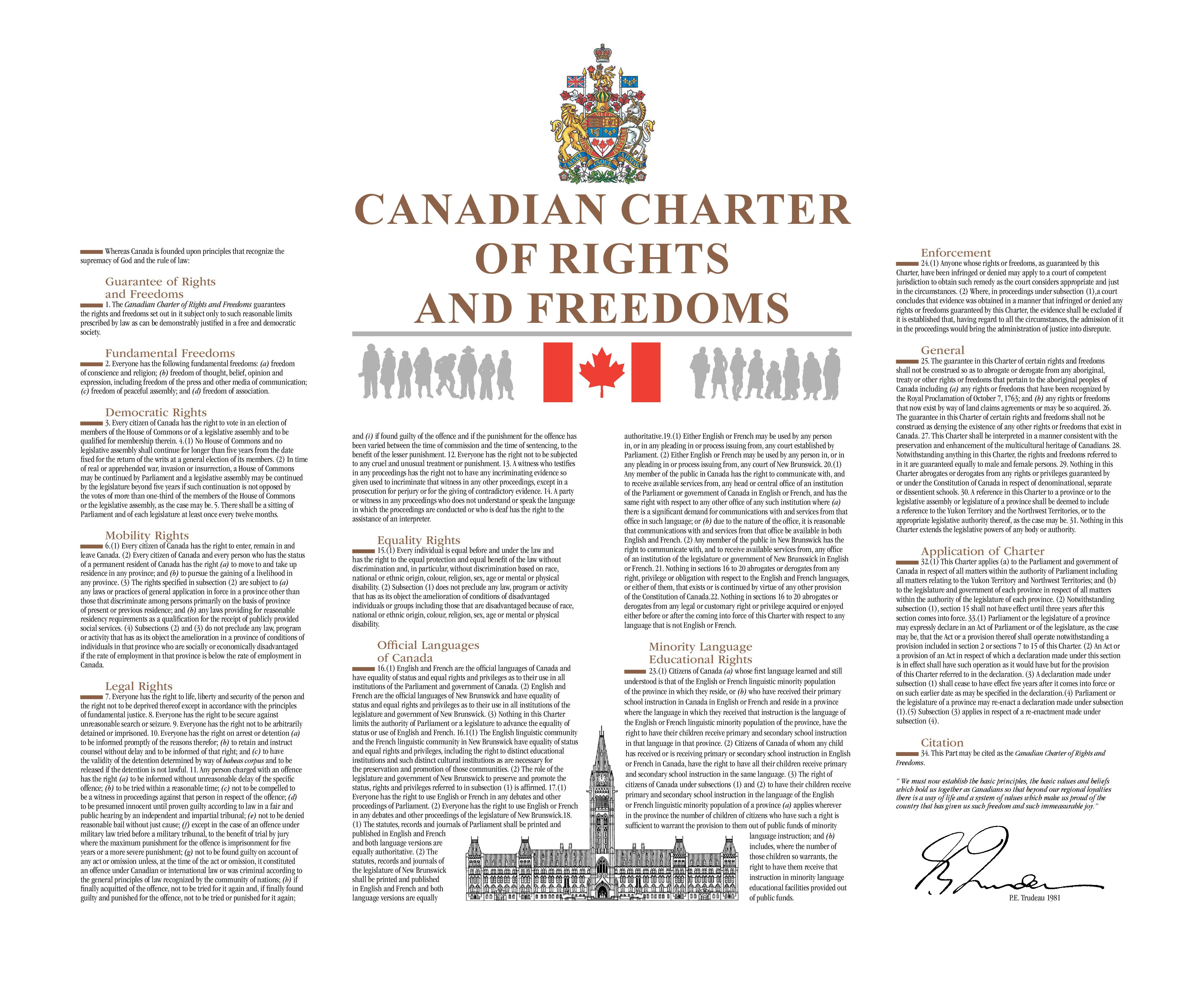
A copy of the Canadian Charter of Rights and Freedoms

When the Canadian constitution was patriated by Prime Minister Trudeau in 1982, one of its constituent documents was the Charter of Rights and Freedoms, and section 27 of the Charter stipulates that the rights laid out in the document are to be interpreted in a manner consistent with the spirit of multiculturalism.

The Canadian Multiculturalism Act was introduced during the Progressive Conservative government of Brian Mulroney, and received Royal Assent on July 21, 1988. On a practical level, a result of the Multiculturalism Act was that federal funds began to be distributed to ethnic groups to help them preserve their cultures, leading to such projects as the construction of community centres.

In June 2000 Prime Minister Jean Chrétien stated:

Canada has become a post-national, multicultural society. It contains the globe within its borders, and Canadians have learned that their two international languages and their diversity are a comparative advantage and a source of continuing creativity and innovation. Canadians are, by virtue of history and necessity, open to the world.

With this in mind on November 13, 2002, the Liberal government of Prime Minister Jean Chrétien designated, by Royal Proclamation, June 27 of each year Canadian Multiculturalism Day.

==== Charter of Rights and Freedoms ====
Professor Alan Cairns noted about the Canadian Charter of Rights and Freedoms , "the initial federal government premise was on developing a pan-Canadian identity"'. Pierre Trudeau himself later wrote in his Memoirs (1993) that "Canada itself" could now be defined as a "society where all people are equal and where they share some fundamental values based upon freedom", and that all Canadians could identify with the values of liberty and equality.

Section Twenty-seven of the Charter states that:

This Charter shall be interpreted in a manner consistent with the preservation and enhancement of the multicultural heritage of Canadians.

Section Fifteen of the Charter that covers equality states:

Every individual is equal before and under the law and has the right to equal protection and equal benefit of the law without discrimination and, in particular, without discrimination based on race, national or ethnic origin, colour, religion, sex, age, or mental or physical disability.

==== Canadian Multiculturalism Act ====
The 1988 Canadian Multiculturalism Act affirms the policy of the government to ensure that every Canadian receives equal treatment by the government which respects and celebrates diversity. The "Act" in general recognizes:

- The importance of preserving Canada's multicultural heritage.
- The rights of indigenous peoples.
- English and French remain the only official languages.
- Social equality within society and under the law regardless of race, colour, ancestry, national or ethnic origin, creed or religion.
- Minorities' rights to enjoy their cultures.

Section 3 (1) of the act states:

It is hereby declared to be the policy of the Government of Canada to

(a) recognize and promote the understanding that multiculturalism reflects the cultural and racial diversity of Canadian society and acknowledges the freedom of all members of Canadian society to preserve, enhance and share their cultural heritage

(b) to recognize and promote the understanding that multiculturalism is a fundamental characteristic of the Canadian heritage and identity and that it provides an invaluable resource in the shaping of Canada's future

==== Broadcasting Act ====
In the Multiculturalism Act, the federal government proclaimed the recognition of the diversity of Canadian culture. Similarly the Broadcasting Act of 1991 asserts the Canadian broadcasting system should reflect the diversity of cultures in the country. The CRTC is the governmental body which enforces the Broadcasting Act. The CRTC revised their Ethnic Broadcasting Policy in 1999 to go into the details on the conditions of the distribution of ethnic and multilingual programming. One of the conditions that this revision specified was the amount of ethnic programming needed in order to be awarded the ethnic broadcasting licence. According to the act, 60% of programming on a channel, whether on the radio or television, has to be considered ethnic in order to be approved for the licence under this policy.

== Domestic support and global influence ==
Multiculturalism has been embraced by the majority of Canadians, and is looked upon with admiration outside the country, resulting in much of the Canadian public dismissing most critics of the concept. Multiculturalism is often cited as one of Canada's significant accomplishments and a key distinguishing element of Canadian identity. Richard Gwyn has suggested that "tolerance" has replaced "loyalty" as the touchstone of Canadian identity. Multiculturalism has been emphasized in recent decades. Emma Ambrose and Cas Mudde examining surveys of Western nations report:

Data confirms that Canada has fostered a much more accepting society for immigrants and their culture than other Western countries. For example, Canadians are the most likely to agree with the statement that immigrants make their country a better place to live and that immigrants are good for the economy. They are also the least likely to say that there are too many immigrants in their country, that immigration has placed too much pressure on public services, and that immigrants have made it more difficult for natives to find a job.

Ambrose and Mudde conclude that: "Canada's unique multiculturalism policy... is based on a combination of selective immigration, comprehensive integration, and strong state repression of dissent on these policies". This unique blend of policies has led to a relatively low level of opposition to multiculturalism.

Canadian supporters of multiculturalism promote the idea because they believe that immigrants help society grow culturally, economically and politically. Supporters declare that multiculturalism policies help in bringing together immigrants and minorities in the country and pushes them towards being part of the Canadian society as a whole. Supporters also argue that cultural appreciation of ethnic and religious diversity promotes a greater willingness to tolerate political differences.

Sociologist N. M. Sussman says, "The tenets of this concept permitted and subtly encouraged the private maintenance of ethnic values while simultaneously insisting on minimal public adherence to Canadian behaviours and to Canadian values." As result, immigrants to Canada are more likely to maintain the values and attitudes of both the home and of the host culture, compared to similar immigrants to Australia, the United Kingdom, or the United States.

Former Director General of Minister of Multiculturalism and Citizenship Andrew Griffith, argues that, "89 percent of Canadians believe that foreign-born Canadians are just as likely to be good citizens as those born in Canada....But Canadians clearly view multiculturalism in an integrative sense, with an expectation that new arrivals will adopt Canadian values and attitudes." Griffith adds that, "There are virtually no differences between Canadian-born and foreign-born with respect to agreement to abide by Canadian values (70 and 68 percent, respectively)."

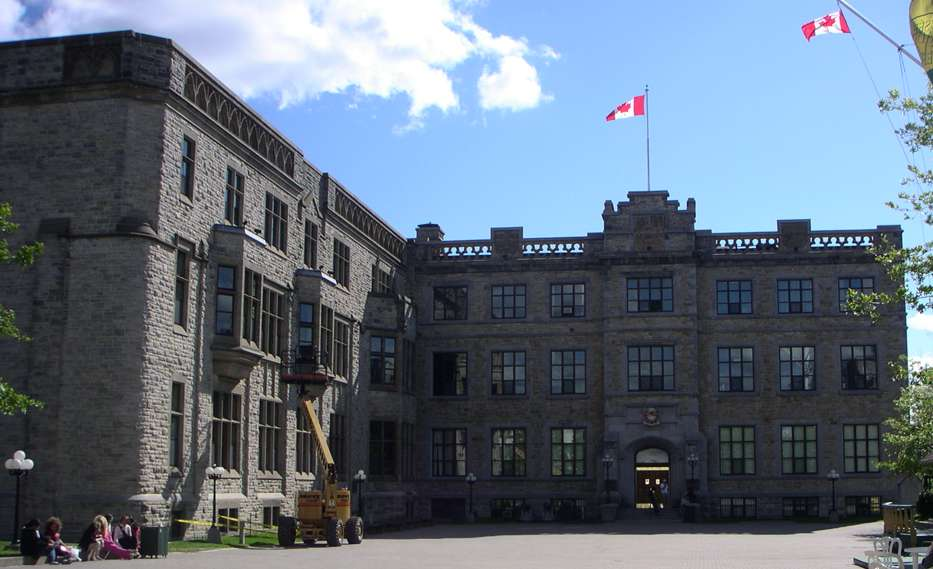
The Global Centre for Pluralism is located in Ottawa on Sussex Drive at the former location of the Canadian War Museum.

Aga Khan, the 49th Imam of the Ismaili Muslims, described Canada as: "the most successful pluralist society on the face of our globe, without any doubt in my mind.... That is something unique to Canada. It is an amazing global human asset." Aga Khan explained that the experience of Canadian governance – its commitment to pluralism and its support for the rich multicultural diversity of its peoples – is something that must be shared and would be of benefit to societies in other parts of the world. With this in mind, in 2006 the Global Centre for Pluralism was established in partnership with the Government of Canada.

The Economist ran a cover story in 2016 praising Canada as the most successful multicultural society in the West. The Economist argued that Canada's multiculturalism was a source of strength that united the diverse population and by attracting immigrants from around the world was also an engine of economic growth as well. I In 2021, the Social Progress Index ranked Canada 6th in the world for overall tolerance and inclusion.

== Criticisms ==
Critics of multiculturalism in Canada often debate whether the multicultural ideal of benignly co-existing cultures that interrelate and influence one another, and yet remain distinct, is sustainable, paradoxical or even desirable. In the introduction to an article which presents research showing that "the multiculturalism policy plays a positive role" in "the process of immigrant and minority integration," Citizenship and immigration Canada sums up the critics' position by stating:

Critics argue that multiculturalism promotes ghettoization and balkanization, encouraging members of ethnic groups to look inward, and emphasizing the differences between groups rather than their shared rights or identities as Canadian citizens.

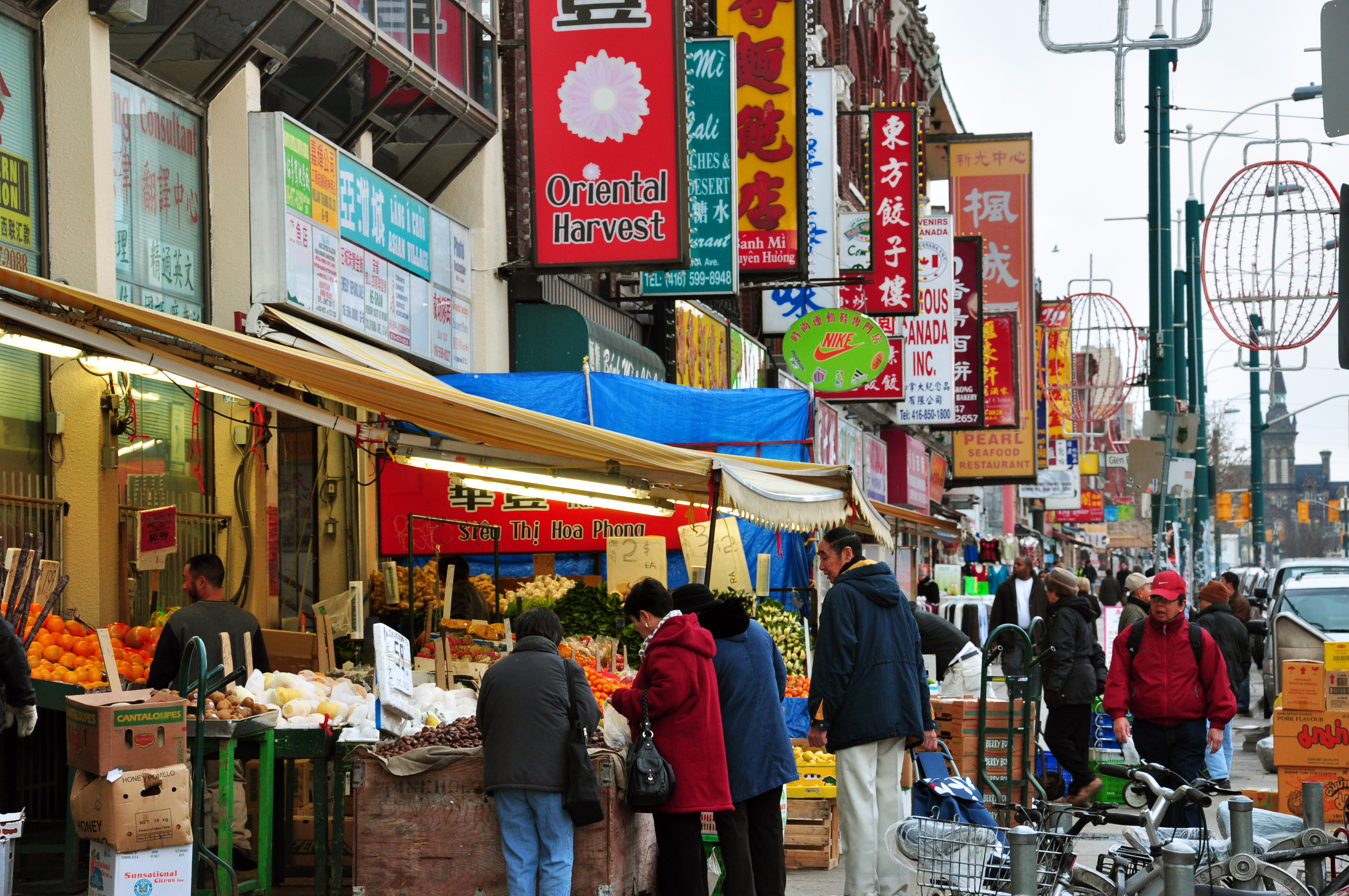
Toronto's Chinatown is an ethnic enclave located in the city centre.

Canadian Neil Bissoondath in his book Selling Illusions: The Cult of Multiculturalism in Canada, argues that official multiculturalism limits the freedom of minority members, by confining them to cultural and geographic ethnic enclaves ("social ghettos"). He also argues that cultures are very complex, and must be transmitted through close family and kin relations. To him, the government view of cultures as being about festivals and cuisine is a crude oversimplification that leads to easy stereotyping.

Canadian Daniel Stoffman's book Who Gets In questions the policy of Canadian multiculturalism. Stoffman points out that many cultural practices (outlawed in Canada), such as allowing dog meat to be served in restaurants and street cockfighting, are simply incompatible with Canadian and Western culture. He also raises concern about the number of recent older immigrants who are not being linguistically integrated into Canada (i.e., not learning either English or French). He stresses that multiculturalism works better in theory than in practice and Canadians need to be far more assertive about valuing the "national identity of English-speaking Canada".

Professor Joseph Garcea, the Department Head of Political Studies at the University of Saskatchewan, explores the validity of attacks on multiculturalism because it supposedly segregates the peoples of Canada. He argues that multiculturalism hurts the Canadian, Québécois, and indigenous cultures, identity, and nationalism projects. Furthermore, he argues, it perpetuates conflicts between and within groups.

Some pundits, such as The Globe and Mail's Jeffrey Simpson and Carleton University journalism professor Andrew Cohen, have argued that the entire melting pot/mosaic dynamic is largely an imagined concept and that there remains little measurable evidence that American or Canadian immigrants as collective groups can be proven to be more or less "assimilated" or "multicultural" than each other.

=== Quebec society ===
Despite an official federal bilingualism policy, many commentators from Quebec believe multiculturalism threatens to reduce them to just another ethnic group. Quebec's policy seeks to promote interculturalism, welcoming people of all origins while insisting that they integrate into Quebec's majority French-speaking society. In 2008, a Consultation Commission on Accommodation Practices Related to Cultural Differences, headed by sociologist Gerard Bouchard and philosopher Charles Taylor, recognized that Quebec is a de facto pluralist society, but that the Canadian multiculturalism model "does not appear well suited to conditions in Quebec".

In June 2022, François Legault, premier of Quebec, said he is against multiculturalism. He said that he prefers the model of "interculturalism" and that all cultures should not be placed on the same level, with the French language and Quebec culture being the cornerstone of integration for newcomer.

=== Indigenous peoples ===
The framework of multiculturalism has been accused of facilitating the ongoing attempts to assimilate and the marginalization of Indigenous peoples . Some critics see multiculturalism as a tool of Canadian settler colonialism that often obscures the dispossession of Indigenous peoples. The Canadian government groups Indigenous peoples under the "multicultural umbrella" dismissing treaty and land rights, treating them like one giant minority group. Thus multiculturalism maintains the settler-colonial framework by managing diversity without returning land or power to Indigenous nations.

== Provincial legislation and policies ==
All ten of Canada's provinces have some form of multiculturalism policy. At present, six of the ten provinces – British Columbia, Alberta, Saskatchewan, Manitoba, Quebec, and Nova Scotia – have enacted multiculturalism legislation. In eight provinces – British Columbia, Alberta, Saskatchewan, Manitoba, Quebec, New Brunswick, Prince Edward Island, and Nova Scotia – a multiculturalism advisory council reports to the minister responsible for multiculturalism. In Alberta, the Alberta Human Rights Commission performs the role of multiculturalism advisory council. In Nova Scotia, the Act is implemented by both a Cabinet committee on multiculturalism and advisory councils. Ontario has an official multicultural policy and the Ministry of Citizenship and Immigration is responsible for promoting social inclusion, civic and community engagement and recognition. The Government of Newfoundland and Labrador launched the province's policy on multiculturalism in 2008 and the Minister of Advanced Education and Skills leads its implementation.

While the territorial governments do not have multiculturalism policies per se, they have human rights acts that prohibit discrimination based on, among other things, race, colour, ancestry, ethnic origin, place of origin, creed or religion. In Whitehorse, the Multicultural Centre of the Yukon provides services to immigrants.

=== British Columbia ===
British Columbia legislated the Multiculturalism Act in 1993. The purposes of this act (s. 2) are:

- to recognize that the diversity of British Columbians as regards race, cultural heritage, religion, ethnicity, ancestry and place of origin is a fundamental characteristic of the society of British Columbia that enriches the lives of all British Columbians;
- to encourage respect for the multicultural heritage of British Columbia;
- to promote racial harmony, cross cultural understanding and respect and the development of a community that is united and at peace with itself;
- to foster the creation of a society in British Columbia in which there are no impediments to the full and free participation of all British Columbians in the economic, social, cultural and political life of British Columbia.

=== Alberta ===
Alberta primarily legislated the Alberta Cultural Heritage Act in 1984 and refined it with the Alberta Multiculturalism Act in 1990. The current legislation pertaining to multiculturalism is The Human Rights, Citizenship and Multiculturalism Act that passed in 1996. This current legislation deals with discrimination in race, religious beliefs, colour, gender, physical disability, age, marital status and sexual orientation, among other things. Alberta Human Rights chapter A‑25.5 states:

- multiculturalism describes the diverse racial and cultural composition of Alberta society and its importance is recognized in Alberta as a fundamental principle and a matter of public policy;
- it is recognized in Alberta as a fundamental principle and as a matter of public policy that all Albertans should share in an awareness and appreciation of the diverse racial and cultural composition of society and that the richness of life in Alberta is enhanced by sharing that diversity; and
- it is fitting that these principles be affirmed by the Legislature of Alberta in an enactment whereby those equality rights and that diversity may be protected.

=== Saskatchewan ===
Saskatchewan was the first Canadian province to adopt legislation on multiculturalism. This piece of legislation was called The Saskatchewan Multiculturalism Act of 1974, but has since been replaced by the new, revised Multiculturalism Act (1997). The purposes of this act (s. 3) are similar to those of British Columbia:

- to recognize that the diversity of Saskatchewan people with respect to race, cultural heritage, religion, ethnicity, ancestry and place of origin is a fundamental characteristic of Saskatchewan society that enriches the lives of all Saskatchewan people;
- to encourage respect for the multicultural heritage of Saskatchewan;
- to foster a climate for harmonious relations among people of diverse cultural and ethnic backgrounds without sacrificing their distinctive cultural and ethnic identities;
- to encourage the continuation of a multicultural society.

The motto of the province of Saskatchewan, adopted in 1986, is Multis e gentibus vires (“from many peoples, strength” or “out of many peoples, strength”).

=== Manitoba ===
Manitoba's first piece of legislation on multiculturalism was the Manitoba Intercultural Council Act in 1984. In the summer on 1992, the province developed a new provincial legislation called the Multiculturalism Act. The purposes of this act (s. 2) are to:

- recognize and promote understanding that the cultural diversity of Manitoba is a strength of and a source of pride to Manitobans;
- recognize and promote the right of all Manitobans, regardless of culture, religion or racial background, to: (i) equal access to opportunities, (ii) participate in all aspects of society, and (iii) respect for their cultural values; and
- enhance the opportunities of Manitoba's multicultural society by acting in partnership with all cultural communities and by encouraging cooperation and partnerships between cultural communities

=== Ontario ===
Ontario had a policy in place in 1977 that promoted cultural activity, but formal legislation for a Ministry of Citizenship and Culture (now known as Ministry of Citizenship and Immigration) only came to fruition in 1982. The Ministry of Citizenship and Culture Act (1990) (s. 4) states its purpose:

- to encourage full, equal and responsible citizenship among the residents of Ontario;
- recognizing the pluralistic nature of Ontario society, to stress the full participation of all Ontarians as equal members of the community, encouraging the sharing of cultural heritage while affirming those elements held in common by all residents;
- to ensure the creative and participatory nature of cultural life in Ontario by assisting in the stimulation of cultural expression and cultural preservation;
- to foster the development of individual and community excellence, enabling Ontarians to better define the richness of their diversity and the shared vision of their community.

=== Quebec ===
Support for federal legislation on multiculturalism is favored by the population, however, Quebec differs from the rest of the nine provinces in that its policy focuses on "interculturalism"- rather than multiculturalism, where diversity is strongly encouraged, but only under the notion that it is within the framework that establishes French as the public language. Immigrant children must attend French language schools; most signage in English-only is banned (but bilingual signage is common in many communities).

In 1990, Quebec released a White paper called Lets Build Quebec Together: A Policy Statement on Integration and Immigration which reinforced three main points:

- Quebec is a French-speaking society
- Quebec is a democratic society in which everyone is expected to contribute to public life
- Quebec is a pluralistic society that respects the diversity of various cultures from within a democratic framework

In 2005, Quebec passed legislation to develop the Ministry of Immigration and Cultural Communities, their functions were:

- to support cultural communities in order to facilitate their full participation in Quebec society
- to foster openness to pluralism; and
- to foster closer intercultural relations among the people of Quebec.

In 2015, when the Coalition Avenir Quebec (CAQ) took a nationalist turn, they advocated for "exempting Quebec from the requirements of multiculturalism.". One of the key priorities for the CAQ when elected in 2018 Quebec election was reducing the number of immigrants to 40,000 annually; a 20 per cent reduction.

=== New Brunswick ===
New Brunswick first introduced its multicultural legislation in 1986. The policy is guided by four principles: equality, appreciation, preservation of cultural heritages and participation. In the 1980s the provincial government developed a Ministerial Advisory Committee to provide assistance to the minister of Business in New Brunswick, who is in turn responsible for settlement and multicultural communities. New Brunswick is Canada's only officially bilingual province, with French and English-language provincial government services and schooling made available equally to all residents.

=== Nova Scotia ===
Nova Scotia introduced their multicultural legislation, the Act to Promote and Preserve Multiculturalism, in 1989. The purpose of this Act is (s. 3):

- encouraging recognition and acceptance of multiculturalism as an inherent feature of a pluralistic society;
- establishing a climate for harmonious relations among people of diverse cultural and ethnic backgrounds without sacrificing their distinctive cultural and ethnic identities;
- encouraging the continuation of a multicultural society as a mosaic of different ethnic groups and cultures

=== Prince Edward Island ===
Prince Edward Island introduced their legislation on multiculturalism, the Provincial Multicultural Policy, in 1988. This policies objectives were (s. 4):

- serve to indicate that the province embraces the multicultural reality of Canadian society and acknowledges that Prince Edward Island has a distinctive multicultural heritage
- acknowledge the intrinsic worth and continuing contribution of al Prince Edward Islanders regardless of race, religion ethnicity, linguistic origin or length of residency.
- serve as an affirmation of Human Rights for all Prince Edward Islanders and as a complement to the equality of rights guaranteed in the P.E.I. Human Rights Act and the Canadian Charter of Rights and Freedoms.
- encourage specific legislative, political and social commitments to multiculturalism in Prince Edward Island

=== Newfoundland and Labrador ===
Newfoundland and Labrador first legislated their Policy on Multiculturalism in 2008. Some of the policies are to:

- ensure that relevant policies and procedures of provincial programs and practices reflect, and consider the changing needs of all cultural groups;
- lead in developing, sustaining and enhancing programs and services based on equality for all, notwithstanding racial, religious, ethnic, national and social origin;
- provide government workplaces that are free of discrimination and that promote equality of opportunity for all persons accessing employment positions within the Government of Newfoundland and Labrador;
- support multicultural initiatives by enhancing partnerships with culturally-diverse communities and provincial departments and agencies

== Statistics and surveys ==
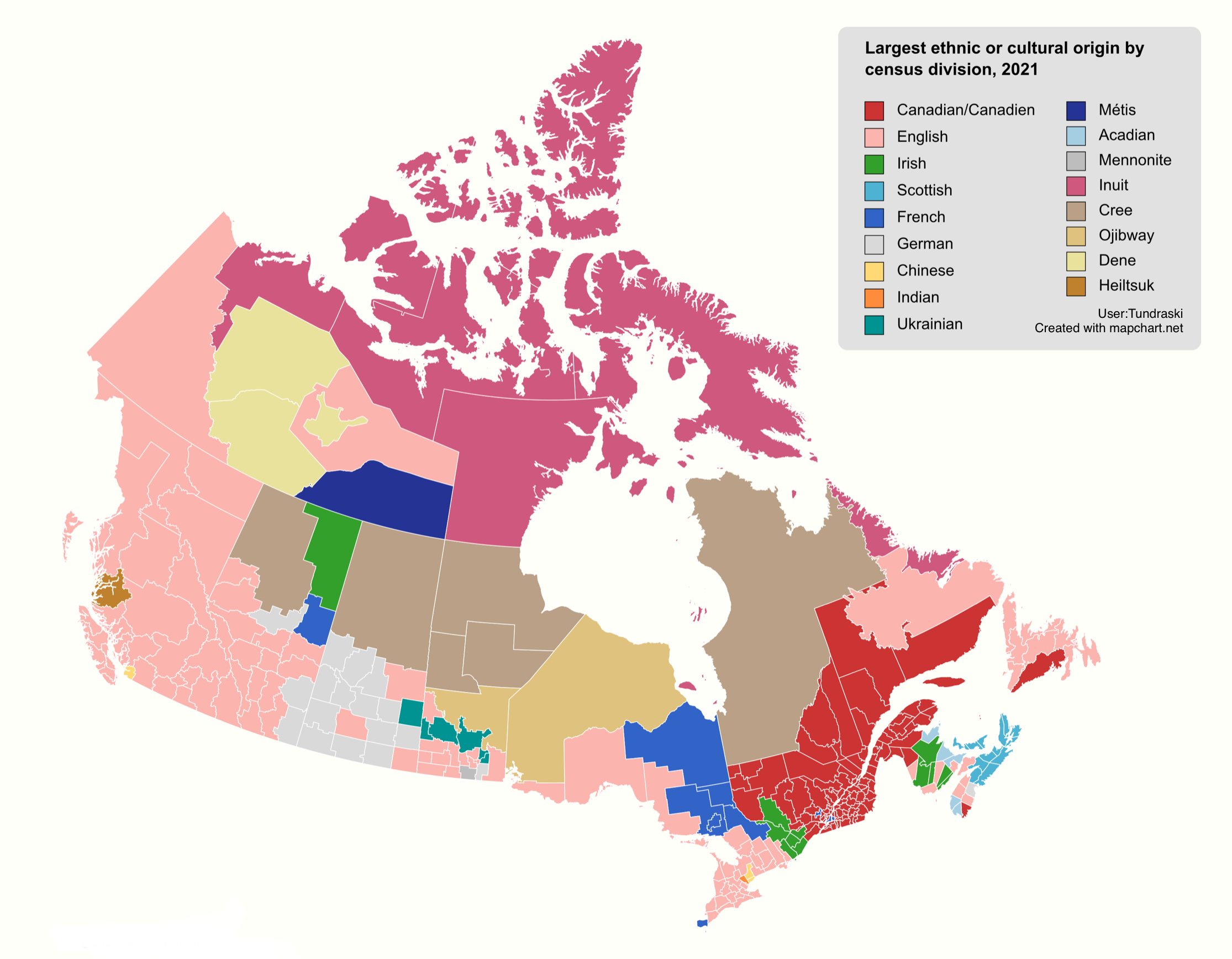

Data from the 2021 Census showed that close to 7 in 10 agreed to a great extent with respect for Indigenous culture (68%) and ethnic and cultural diversity (67%), while the percentage of Canadians who were strongly supportive of having both English and French as Canada's official languages was lower, at 55%. Just over 9 in 10 Canadians aged 15 and older agreed that ethnic or cultural diversity is a Canadian value. In 2015, nearly nine in ten (87%) Canadians were proud to identify as Canadian, with over half (61%) expressing they were very proud.

In the second quarter of 2025, there were nearly one million private-sector businesses in Canada. Of these, 20.1% were majority-owned by immigrants, 14.4% by visible minorities, and 4.5% by Indigenous peoples. The 2021 Statistics Canada Census revealed that Canadians reported over 450 different ethnic or cultural origins, with half of the population (over 19 million) identifying European origins. Of the 36.3 million people enumerated in 2021, approximately 25.4 million reported being "White", representing 69.8 percent of the population. About 7 million reported Asian origins, nearly 1.4 million reported African origins, over 900,000 reported Latin, Central, and South American origins, while over 774,500 traced origins to the Caribbean, and over 105,000 to Oceania. The census also counted 1.8 million Indigenous individuals, accounting for almost 5% of the population.

Data from the 2021 Census showed that 450 languages were spoken at home in Canada, including 68 Indigenous languages. Immigration has increased the number of Canadians whose mother tongue is not English or French; one in four Canadians had a non-official mother tongue in 2021. Among these individuals, 68.8% spoke at least one official language at home regularly. Some of the most common first languages include Mandarin (679,255 first-language speakers), Punjabi (666,585), Cantonese (553,380), Spanish (538,870), Arabic (508,410), Tagalog (461,150), Italian (319,505), German (272,865), and Tamil (237,890).

In 2021, over 19.3 million people reported a Christian religion, representing just over half of the Canadian population (53.3%). However, this proportion is down from 67.3% in 2011 and 77.1% in 2001. Approximately 12.6 million people, or more than one-third of Canada's population, reported having no religious affiliation. The Jewish, Islamic, Jains, Sikh, Hindu, and Buddhist communities—although small—are as old as the nation itself.

In 2023, the Statistics Canada survey found that 55.2% of adults in the seven largest racialized groups rated their health as very good or excellent, slightly higher than the overall population rate of 52.2%. The highest ratings came from the Latin American (61.2%) and Filipino (58.7%) groups. However, in 2020, only 26% of racialized individuals over 65 had employment income, compared to 29% of non-racialized individuals.

The 2023 survey also found that 85% of Canadians felt workplace cultural differences were respected, but about 12% experienced discrimination or unequal treatment, particularly among Black and Korean individuals. Participation in sports was noted as high, with 55% of Canadians aged 15 and older having participated. Korean, Chinese, West Asian, Arab, and mixed-racial participants showed the highest rates, but 26% of sports participants also reported experiencing racism and discrimination in community sports.

== See also ==
- A Theory of Justice
- Feminism in Canada
- Freedom of religion in Canada
- Heritage conservation in Canada
- Social programs in Canada
