= Canadian identity =

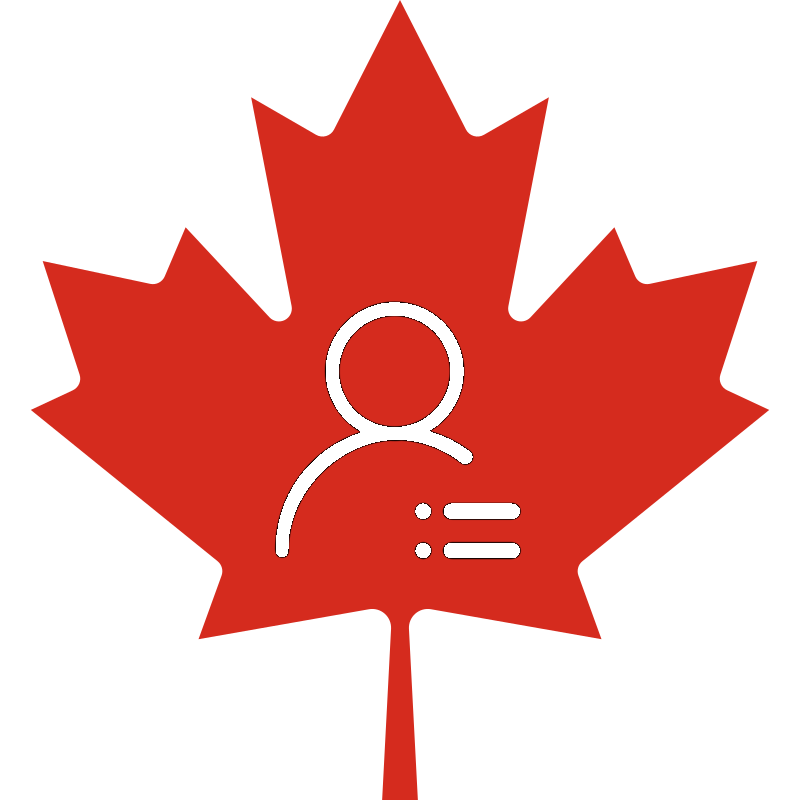

Data on national identity (Statistics Canada)
- Proud to identify as Canadian: 87%

Identify with...
- Canadian history: 70%
- Armed forces / peacekeeping: 64%
- Universal health care: 64%
- Constitution of Canada: 63%

National representative symbols
- Charter of Rights and Freedoms: 90%
- National flag (Maple Leaf): 90%
- National anthem: 88%
- RCMP: 87%
- Hockey: 77%

Perceived shared values
- Human rights: 89%
- Gender equality: 81%
- Respect for the law: 80%
- Indigenous respect: 68%
- Diversity: 67%

Canadian identity refers to the unique culture, characteristics and condition of being Canadian, as well as the many symbols and expressions that set Canada and Canadians apart from other peoples and cultures of the world. Changes in demographics, history, and social interactions have led to alterations in the Canadian identity over time. This identity is not fixed; as Canadian values evolve they impact Canadians' social integration, civic engagement, and connections with one another. In Quebec, identity is strong and there is a French Canadian culture that is distinct from English Canadian and Indigenous identities. Nonetheless, as a whole, Canadian multiculturalism, is in theory a cultural mosaic of regional ethnic subcultures and diverse areas including ethnic enclaves, with nearly nine in ten (87%) Canadians being proud to identify as Canadian, with over half (61%) expressing they were very proud.

The question of Canadian identity was traditionally dominated by two fundamental themes: first, the often conflicted relationship between English Canadians and French Canadians, stemming from the Francophone imperative for cultural and linguistic survival; secondly, the close ties between English Canadians and the British Empire, and the gradual political process towards complete independence from the "mother country". As political ties between Canada and the British Empire weakened, immigrants from various regions shaped Canadian identity.

Despite efforts, Canadians have never been able to agree on a cohesive image of their country. The notions of Canadian identity have oscillated between oneness and plurality, emphasizing either a single Canada or multiple nations. Modern Canadian identity is characterized by both unity and plurality. This pluralist approach is to find common ground and evaluate identity through regional, ethnic (including immigrants), religious and political debate. Richard Gwyn has suggested that "tolerance" has replaced "loyalty" as the touchstone of Canadian identity. Canadian prime ministers and journalists have defined the country as a postnational state.

Today, Canada is theoretically a just society with constitutional protection for policies that promote multiculturalism in lieu of a monolithic national myth based on any single ethnicity or language. Canadians identify with the country's institutions of health care, military peacekeeping, the national park system, and the Canadian Charter of Rights and Freedoms. More than 90 per cent of polled Canadians believed that the Canadian Charter of Rights and Freedoms and the national flag were the top symbols of Canadian identity. Next highest were the national anthem, the Royal Canadian Mounted Police, and ice hockey.

== Surveys ==
=== Statistics Canada ===
The national identity has changed over time due to demographic shifts, historical events, and social relationships. It is not fixed but evolves, influencing social integration, civic engagement, and relationships among Canadians. The General Social Survey (GSS) in 2013 by Statistics Canada collected data on national identity, including perceptions of national symbols, shared values, and pride in Canadian achievements. The findings reveal that views on Canadian identity vary significantly across different regions and demographics.

Canadians expressing the highest pride levels for Canadian history (70%), the armed forces (64%), the health care system (64%), and the Constitution (63%). However, pride in Canada's political influence was lower at 46%. Outside Quebec, pride ranged from 91% in British Columbia to 94% in Prince Edward Island, while 70% of Quebec residents felt proud. Seniors and women showed the most pride, especially among first- and second-generation immigrants, who valued both Canadian identity and achievements.

National symbols are important representations of identity, positively affecting emotional attachment to the country. In the GSS, Canadians rated the Charter of Rights and Freedoms and the national flag as the top symbols, with over 90% recognizing their importance. Other symbols included the national anthem and the RCMP, while hockey was considered less significant. Perceptions of these symbols differed by age, gender, region, and education level. For instance, seniors believed in the importance of the national anthem and flag more strongly than younger people, who rated the Charter higher. Women were generally more likely to view national symbols as important, except for hockey, which men valued more.

Regional differences were also notable. Residents in Newfoundland and Labrador placed high importance on national symbols, while Quebecers had lower perceptions of their significance, with only a third considering them very important. Among different demographic groups, university-educated Canadians saw the Charter as the most crucial symbol, while overall, Canadians with lower education levels appreciated the Charter and the national flag equally. Household income had little effect on views about national symbols, though higher-income individuals valued hockey more.

Immigrants and visible minorities held national symbols in high regard, particularly the national anthem. Indigenous people's perceptions of national symbols were more favorable compared to non-Indigenous Canadians, and they particularly valued the RCMP and hockey. Data indicates that while fewer Canadians are very proud of political influence or achievements in arts and literature, a notable number take pride in the treatment of various groups, scientific achievements, and the way democracy functions.

The GSS also explored shared values as essential components of Canada's identity. Most Canadians believed that values like human rights, respect for the law, and gender equality were widely shared in the community. However, respect for Indigenous culture and linguistic duality received less strong collective belief. Regional variances showed that Ontarians were most likely to assert that Canadians shared these values, while residents of Saskatchewan and Quebec were less likely to express such views.

==== Pride and sense of belonging ====
Closely related to national identity is pride. According to a 2013 survey, most Canadians expressed a strong sense of national pride. About 87% were proud to be Canadian, with 61% feeling very proud..Another 8% described being somewhat proud and 3% professed not being very proud or not at all proud. Seven in ten seniors aged 65 years and older reported being very proud to be Canadian. This compares to just over half (55%) of those aged 15 to 34, and 61% of those between 35 and 54 years of age. Immigrants more likely to say they were very proud to be Canadian (64% versus 60%), they were more likely to express pride in most Canadian achievements. 66% of second generation immigrants (i.e., children of immigrants) were very proud to be Canadian. Indigenous peoples were as likely as non-Indigenous people to feel proud to be Canadian (87%). A significant 90% of respondents feel a strong connection to Canada.

In 2025, a survey revealed that non-citizens also showed pride, with 76% expressing satisfaction living in Canada. Pride in being Canadian varied across regions for citizens, with 86% of residents in Prince Edward Island feeling proud, while Quebec reported 72% level of pride. Immigrants who became Canadian citizens reported higher pride (85%) compared to those born in Canada (76%). Younger Canadians aged 25 to 34, though initially lower in pride levels with 69%. Older Canadians showed especially high pride levels, with 91% of those aged 75 and older expressing pride in their nationality.

In 2025, 83% of Canadians reported a strong sense of belonging to Canada. This sense of belonging was felt across all provinces, with levels ranging from 78% in Quebec to 93% in Prince Edward Island. Naturalized citizens reported a higher sense of belonging (88%) than those born in Canada (82%). The survey findings show that a strong sense of belonging correlates with overall well-being, as 50% of those with a strong sense of belonging reported high life satisfaction, compared to just 27% among those with weaker feelings of belonging. Similarly, 60% of those who felt strongly connected to Canada reported hope for the future, while only 36% of those with a weaker sense of belonging felt the same.

=== Angus Reid Institute ===
A 2016 opinion poll carried out by the Angus Reid Institute and the Canadian Broadcasting Corporation indicates there is transformations in values, beliefs, and identity among Canadians. The research also uncovers divisions on crucial issues such as respect, fairness, national pride, and aspirations for the future, indicating a shift in the demographics of those who feel marginalized.

While 73% of individuals aged over 65 report a strong connection to the country, this percentage declines to merely 45% among those aged 18-24. Moreover, despite celebrating diversity, 68% of Canadians are of the view that minorities ought to take greater steps towards assimilating into the dominant culture. Residents of Quebec generally maintain that their province will remain a part of Canada, although there exists some friction with other areas, particularly Alberta.

Approximately 64% of Canadians express satisfaction with the nation's current status, a percentage that surpasses those of many other countries. While 62% declare a profound emotional connection to Canada, this sentiment is considerably less pronounced among participants from Quebec. Overall, 79% of Canadians report feelings of pride in their nationality, although individuals from Quebec demonstrate somewhat lower levels of pride.

Concerning Canada's global standing, Canadians predominantly hold a positive view, with nearly 80% believing that the country enjoys a favorable international reputation. The change in governmental leadership in Canada has also influenced national sentiment, fostering a more optimistic atmosphere alongside significant initiatives such as the acceptance of Syrian refugees.

Regarding quality of life, approximately 80% of Canadians express satisfaction. Nevertheless, their perceptions regarding the prospects for future generations are less optimistic. Canadians express a strong sense of collective identity, with 89% indicating they feel as Canadian as anyone else. There is also a broad agreement that values are waning, with many expressing the belief that influencing political decisions is increasingly challenging.

On social and economic matters, Canadians concur on several issues; however, divergent opinions emerge concerning immigration and multiculturalism. While approximately two-thirds are pleased with the integration process of newcomers into communities, many insist that minorities ought to conform more closely to mainstream cultural practices instead of preserving their own traditions and languages.

Economic inequalities catalyze varying opinions among provinces regarding contributions to national revenue. Satisfaction with job availability varies; regions affected by the downturn in oil markets, such as Alberta and Atlantic Canada, display lower satisfaction levels in comparison to Quebec and Manitoba. Canadians are divided on the role of government in the economy, with an equal number supporting free market policies as those advocating for increased regulation.

Significant discussions revolve around the balance between environmental issues and economic expansion, particularly as they relate to sectors like oil sands in Alberta. Although many Canadians regard the oil industry as essential for economic prosperity, local perspectives on its environmental ramifications differ by region, resulting in polarized views across the nation.

== Basic models ==
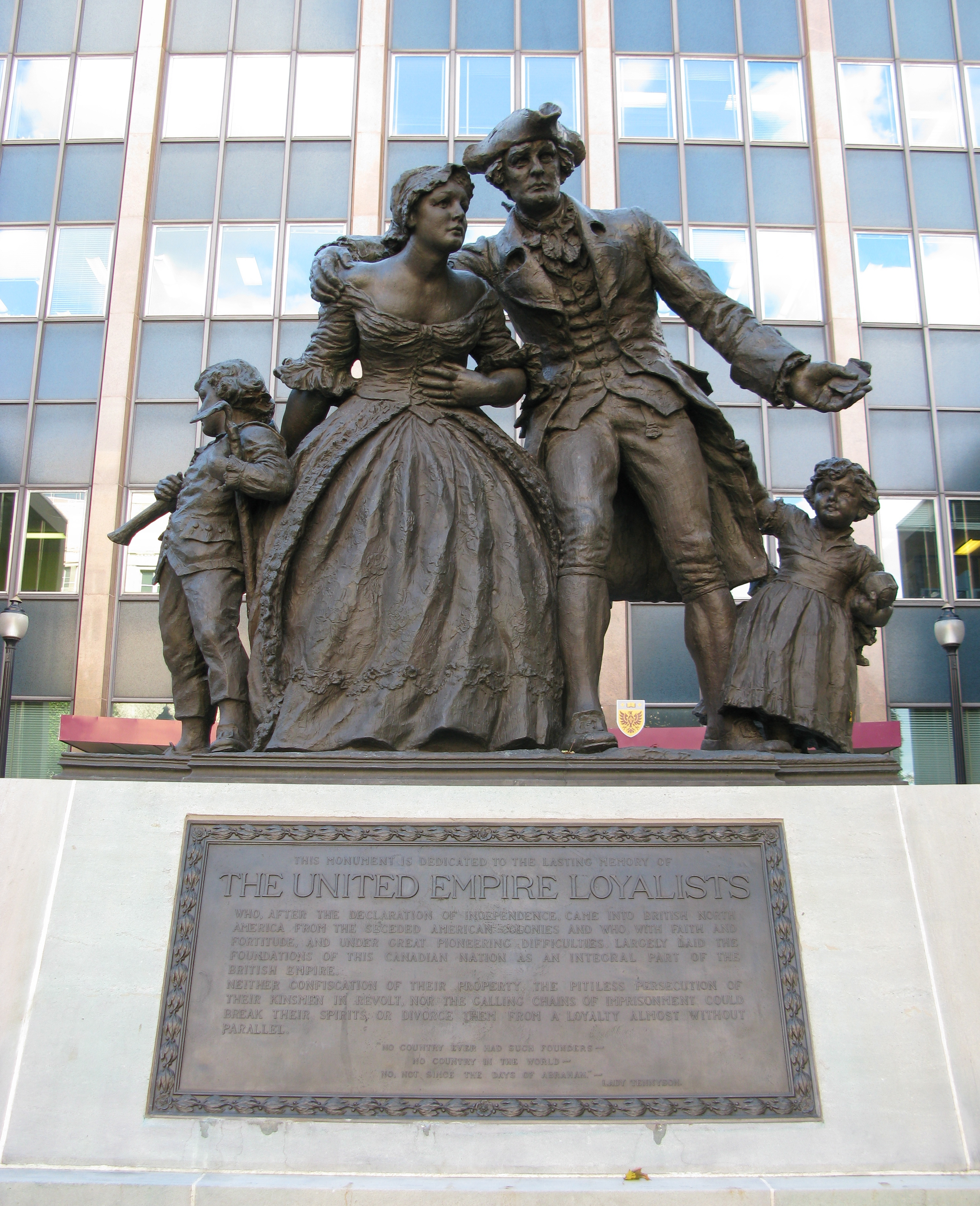
Sydney March's monument to the United Empire Loyalists in Hamilton, Ontario

In defining a Canadian identity, some distinctive characteristics that have been emphasized are:

1. The bicultural nature of Canada; the important ways in which English–French and Protestant-Catholic relations have shaped the Canadian experience since the 1760s.
2. Canada's distinctive historical experience in resisting revolution and republicanism (in contrast to the United States) leading to a lesser societal emphasis on individualism and more support for communitarianism and government activism, such as wheat pools and the health care system.
3. The relationship to the Westminster parliamentary system and the British legal system, the toryism associated with the Loyalists, and the pre-1960 French Canadians have given Canada its ongoing collective commitment to "peace, order, and good government".
4. The social structure of multiple ethnic groups living amongst each other whilst maintaining their identities, producing a "cultural mosaic" as opposed to a "melting pot".
5. The influence of geographical factors (vast area, coldness, northness; St. Lawrence spine), together with the proximity of a global superpower, have produced in the collective Canadian psyche what Northrop Frye has called the garrison mind or siege mentality, and what novelist Margaret Atwood has argued is the Canadian preoccupation with survival. For Herschel Hardin, because of the remarkable hold of the siege mentality and the concern with survival, Canada in its essentials is "a public enterprise country." According to Hardin, the "fundamental mode of Canadian life" has always been, "the un-American mechanism of redistribution as opposed to the mystic American mechanism of market rule." Most Canadians, in other words, whether on the right or left in politics, expect their governments to be actively involved in the economic and social life of the nation.

== Historical development ==
=== Introduction ===
Canada's large geographic size, the presence and survival of a significant number of indigenous peoples, the conquest of one European linguistic population by another, and relatively open immigration policy have led to an extremely diverse society. The exploration of national character and regional culture is a longstanding subject of inquiry for scholars in both Canada and the United States. Baer et al. argue that "Questions of national character and regional culture have long been of interest to both Canadian and American social scientists. The Canadian literature has focussed largely on historical and structural reasons for regional distinctiveness and the possible role of regionalism in undermining a truly national Canadian character or ethos."

=== Indigenous peoples ===
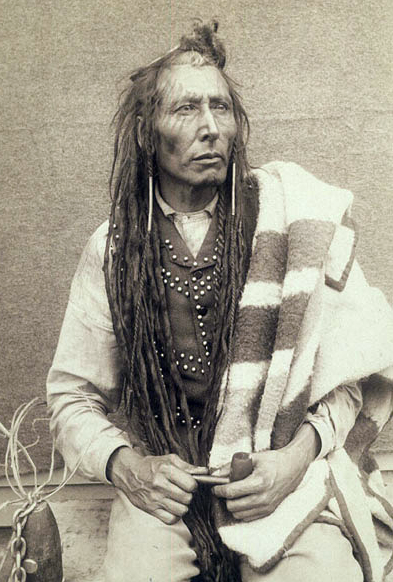
Poundmaker, a Plains Cree chief, wearing a Hudson's Bay point blanket featuring Hudson's Bay stripes (1885)

The indigenous peoples of Canada are divided among a large number of different ethnolinguistic groups, including the Inuit in the northern territory of Nunavut, the Algonquian language groups in eastern Canada (Mi'kmaq in the Maritime Provinces, Abenaki of Quebec and Ojibway of the central region), the Iroquois of central Canada, the Cree of northern Ontario, Quebec and the Great Plains, peoples speaking the Athabaskan languages of Canada's northwest, the Salishan language groups of British Columbia and other peoples of the Pacific coast such as the Tsimshian, Haida, Kwakwaka'wakw and Nuu-chah-nulth. Each of the indigenous peoples developed vibrant societies with complex economies, political structures and cultural traditions that were subsequently affected profoundly by interaction with the European populations. The Métis are an indigenous people whose culture and identity was produced by a fusion of First Nations with the French, Irish and Scottish fur trade society of the north and west.

=== French settlement and the struggle for francophone identity in Canada ===
From the founding by Pierre Dugua, Sieur de Mons of Port Royal (Annapolis Royal) in 1605, (the beginnings of French settlement of Acadia) and the founding of Quebec City in 1608 by Samuel de Champlain, Canada was ruled from and settled almost exclusively by French colonists. John Ralston Saul, among others, has noted that the east–west shape of modern Canada had its origins in decisions regarding alliances with the indigenous peoples made by early French colonizers or explorers such as Champlain or Pierre Gaultier de Varennes, sieur de La Vérendrye. By allying with the Algonquins, for example, Champlain gained an alliance with the Wyandot or Huron of today's Ontario, and the enmity of the Iroquois of what is now northern New York State.

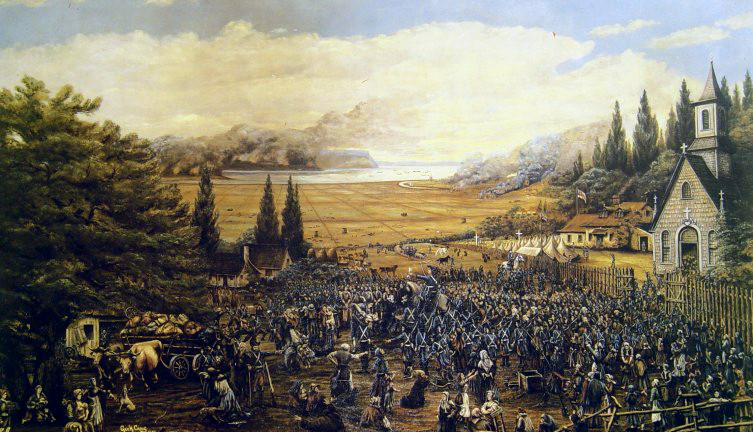
The deportation of the Acadians - 1893 painting, depicting an event in 1755

Although English settlement began in Newfoundland in 1610, and the Hudson's Bay Company was chartered in 1670, it was only with the Treaty of Utrecht in 1713 that France ceded to Great Britain its claims to mainland Nova Scotia and significant British settlement of what would become mainland Canada would begin. Even then, prior to the American Revolution, Nova Scotia was settled largely by planters from New England who took up lands following the deportation of the French-speaking Acadian population, in 1755 in an event known in French to Acadians as Le Grand Dérangement, one of the critical events in the formation of the Canadian identity. During the period of French hegemony over New France the term Canadien referred to the French-speaking inhabitants of Canada.

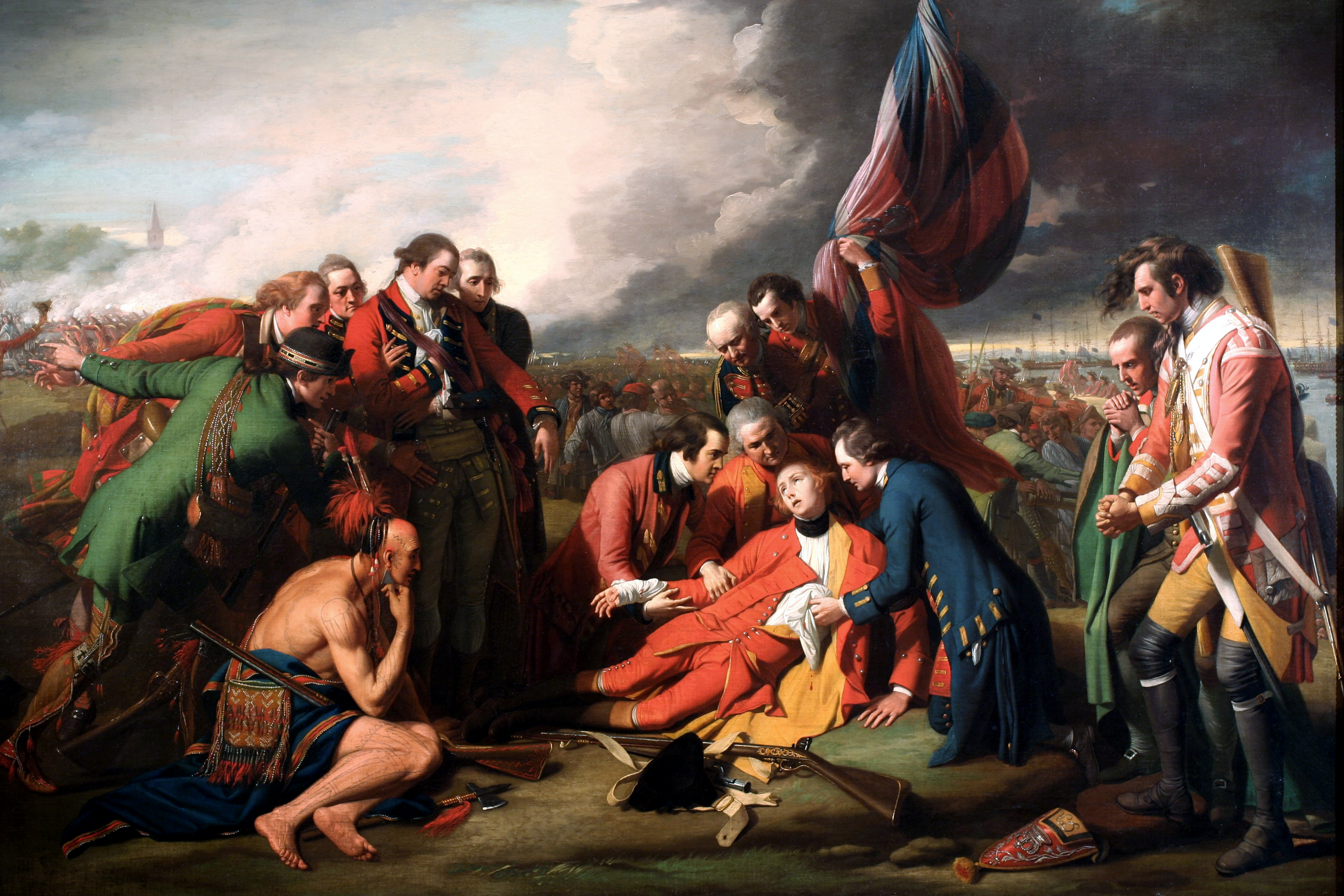
The Death of General Wolfe by Benjamin West, whose subject led the British to victory at the Battle of Quebec

The Seven Years' War between Great Britain and France resulted in the conquest of New France by the British in 1759 at the Battle of the Plains of Abraham, an event that reverberates profoundly even today in the national consciousness of Quebecers. Although there were a number of attempts made by the British authorities to assimilate the French speaking population to the English language and culture, most notably the 1840 Act of Union that followed the seminal report of Lord Durham, British colonial policy for Canada on the whole was one which acknowledged and permitted the continued existence of French language and culture. Nevertheless, the efforts at assimilation of French Canadians, the fate of the French-speaking Acadians and the revolt of the patriotes in 1837 would not be forgotten by their Québécois descendants. Je me souviens, (English: "I remember"), the motto of Quebec, became the watchword of the Québécois. Determined to maintain their cultural and linguistic distinctiveness in the face of Anglophone cultural hegemony and massive immigration of English speaking people to the pre-Confederation Province of Canada, this survivalist determination is a cornerstone of current Québécois identity and much of the political discourse in Quebec. The English Canadian writer and philosopher John Ralston Saul also considers the Ultramontane movement of Catholicism as playing a pivotal and highly negative role in the development of certain aspects of Québécois identity.

=== British settlement in Canada: revolution, invasion, and Confederation ===
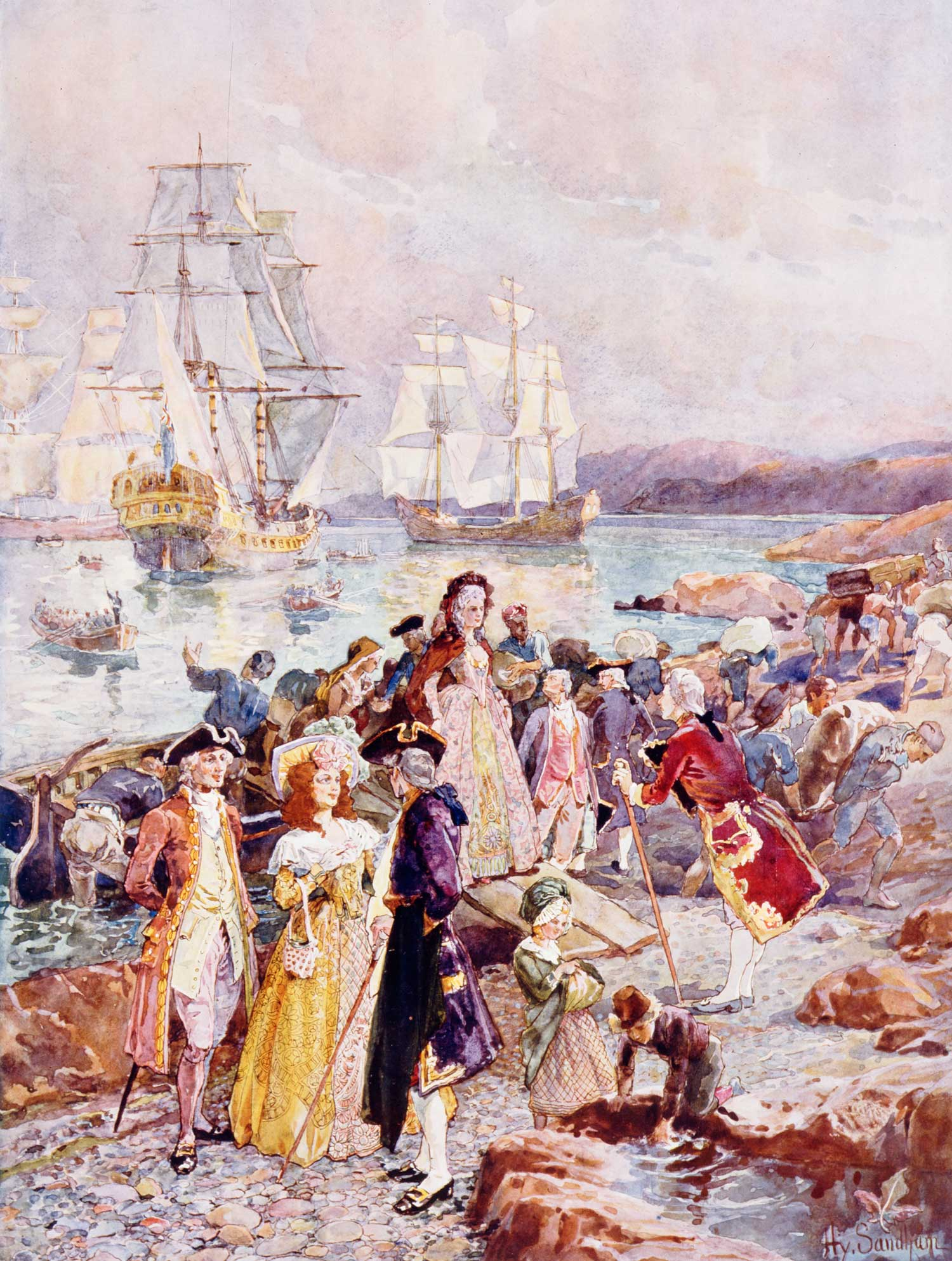
The Coming of the Loyalists by Henry Sandham depicts a romanticised image of the Loyalists' arrival in New Brunswick.

For its part, the identity of English speaking Canada was profoundly influenced by another pivotal historic event, the American Revolution. American colonists who remained loyal to the Crown and who actively supported the British during the Revolution saw their lands and goods confiscated by the new republic at the end of the war. Some 60,000 people, known in Canada as United Empire Loyalists fled the United States or were evacuated after the war, coming to Nova Scotia and Quebec where they received land and some assistance from the British government in compensation and recognition for having taken up arms in defence of King George III and British interests. This population formed the nucleus for two modern Canadian provinces—Ontario and New Brunswick—and had a profound demographic, political and economic influence on Nova Scotia, Prince Edward Island and Quebec. Conservative in politics, distrustful or even hostile towards Americans, republicanism, and especially American republicanism, this group of people marked the British of British North America as a distinctly identifiable cultural entity for many generations, and Canadian commentators continue to assert that the legacy of the Loyalists still plays a vital role in English Canadian identity. According to the author and political commentator Richard Gwyn while "[t]he British connection has long vanished...it takes only a short dig down to the sedimentary layer once occupied by the Loyalists to locate the sources of a great many contemporary Canadian convictions and conventions."

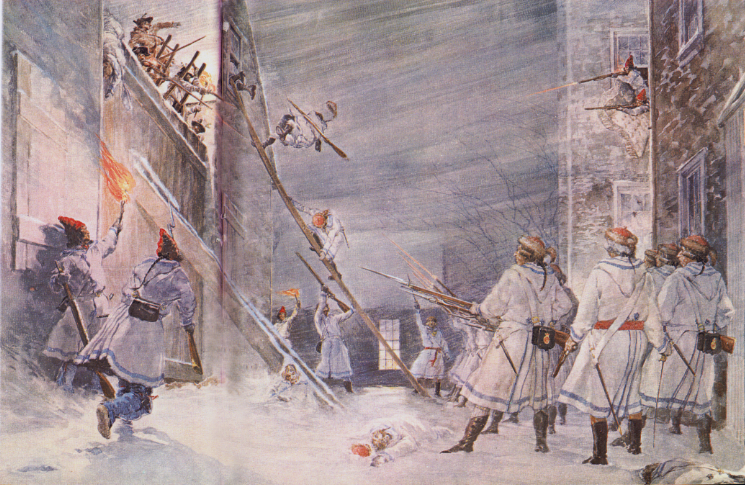
Defending Quebec from an American attack - 1860 painting, depicting a 1775 event

Canada was twice invaded by armed forces from the United States during the American Revolution and the War of 1812. The first invasion occurred in 1775, and succeeded in capturing Montreal and other towns in Quebec before being repelled at Quebec City by a combination of British troops and local militiamen. During this invasion, the French-speaking Canadiens assisted both the invaders from the United Colonies and the defending British. The War of 1812 also saw the invasion of American forces into what was then Upper and Lower Canada, and important British victories at Queenston Heights, Lundy's Lane and Crysler's Farm. The British were assisted again by local militia, this time not only the Canadiens, but also the descendants of the Loyalists who had arrived barely a generation earlier. The Americans however captured control of Lake Erie, cutting off what is today western Ontario; they killed Tecumseh and dealt the Indian allies a decisive defeat from which they never recovered. The War of 1812 has been called "in many respects a war of independence for Canada".

The years following the War of 1812 were marked by heavy immigration from Great Britain to the Canadas and, to a lesser degree, the Maritime Provinces, adding new British elements (English, Scottish and Protestant Irish) to the pre-existing English-speaking populations. During the same period immigration of Catholic Irish brought large numbers of settlers who had no attachment, and often a great hostility, toward Great Britain. The hostility of other groups to the autocratic colonial administrations that were not based on democratic principles of responsible government, principally the French-speaking population of Lower Canada and newly arrived American settlers with no particular ties to Great Britain, were to manifest themselves in the short-lived but symbolically powerful Rebellions of 1837–1838. The term "Canadian", once describing a francophone population, was adopted by English-speaking residents of the Canadas as well, marking the process of converting 'British' immigrants into 'Canadians.'

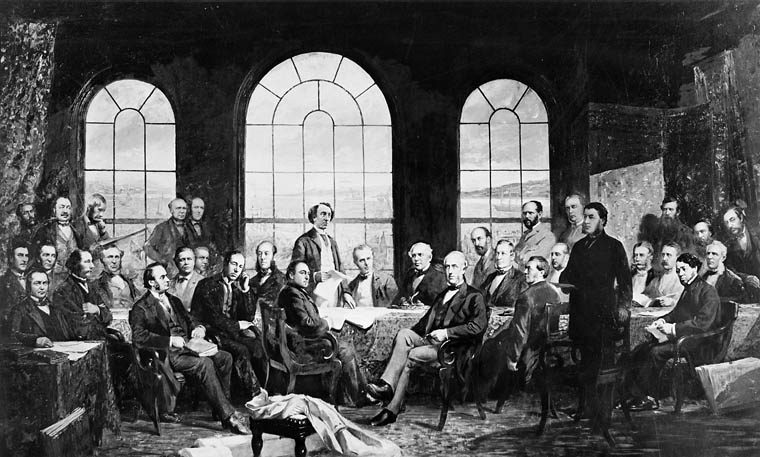
Fathers of Confederation

The merger of the two Canadas in 1840, with political power divided evenly between the former Lower and Upper Canadas, created a political structure that eventually exacerbated tensions between the French and English-speaking populations and which would prove an enduring feature of Canadian identity. As the population of English-speaking and largely Protestant Canada West grew to surpass that of majority French-speaking Catholic Canada East, the population of Canada West began to feel that its interests were becoming subservient to the francophone population of Canada East. George Brown, founder of The Globe newspaper (forerunner of today's The Globe and Mail) and a Father of Confederation wrote that the position of Canada West had become "a base vassalage to French-Canadian Priestcraft." For its part, the French Canadians distrusted the growing anti-Catholic 'British' population of Canada West and sought a structure that could provide at least some control over its own affairs through a Provincial legislature founded on principles of responsible government.

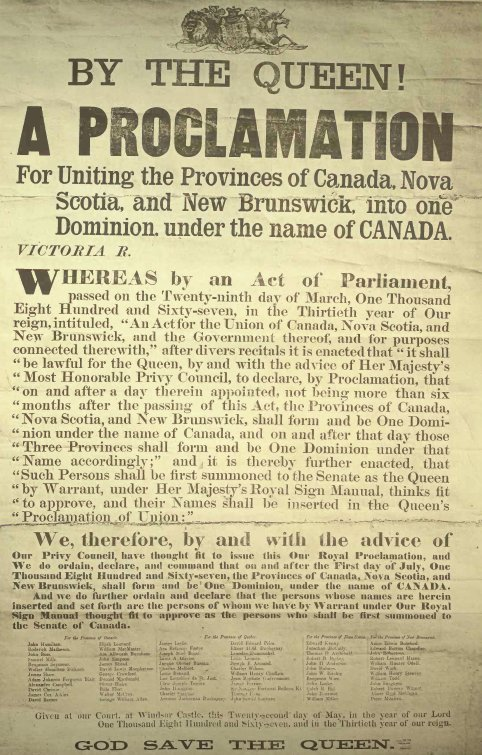
Proclamation of Canadian Confederation (1867)

The union of the Provinces of Canada, Nova Scotia and New Brunswick into a federation in 1867 drew on all of the primary aspects of the Canadian identity: loyalty to Britain (there would be self-governance under a federal parliament, but no rupture from British institutions), limited but significant home rule for a French-speaking majority in the new Province of Quebec (and a longed for solution to English-French tensions), and a collaboration of British North Americans in order to resist the pull and the possible military threat from the United States. The republic to the south had just finished its Civil War as a powerful and united nation with little affection for Britain or its neglected colonies strung along its northern border. So great was the perceived threat that even Queen Victoria thought, prior to Confederation, that it would be "impossible" for Britain to retain Canada.

In their search for an early identity, English Canadians relied heavily on loyalty and attachment to the British Empire, an attitude shaped by the British role in the building of Canada, as evidenced in the lyrics of the informal anthem The Maple Leaf Forever and attitudes of hatred towards French and Irish Canadians. John Ralston Saul sees in the influence of the Orange Order the counterpart of the Ultramontane movement among French Canadians, leading certain groups of English Canadian Protestants to provoke persecution of the Métis and suppress or resist francophone rights.

=== Early dominion ===
After Confederation, Canada became caught up in settlement of the west and extending the dominion to the Pacific Ocean. British Columbia joined Confederation in 1871. Residents of a British colony specifically established to forestall American territorial aspirations in the Fraser Valley, British Columbians were no strangers to the implications of the American doctrine of Manifest Destiny nor the economic attractions of the United States. The construction of the Canadian Pacific Railway, promised to British Columbia as an inducement to join the new dominion, became a powerful and tangible symbol of the nation's identity, linking the provinces and territories together from east to west in order to counteract the inevitable economic and cultural pull from the south.

The settlement of the west also brought to the fore the tensions between the English and French-speaking populations of Canada. The Red River Rebellion, led by Louis Riel, sought to defend the interests of French-speaking Métis against English-speaking Protestant settlers from Ontario. The controversial execution of Thomas Scott, a Protestant from Ontario, on Riel's orders and the furor that followed divided the new dominion along linguistic and religious lines. While Manitoba was created as a bilingual province in 1870 as a solution to the issue, the tensions remained, and would surface again in the North-West Rebellion in the 1880s, when Riel led another rebellion against Ottawa.

CHILD EMIGRATION TO CANADA The attention of the Dominion Government has been drawn to the fact that the children sent to Canada from England are street waifs and workhouse paupers, and that the professional philanthropists engaged in the work are largely prompted by mercenary and not charitable motives. A demand will be made that parliament should investigate the matter before voting any money to promote this kind of immigration.

— The Star, 18 April 1891

From the mid to late 19th century Canada had a policy of assisting immigrants from Europe, including city people and an estimated 100,000 unwanted "Home Children" from Britain. The modern descendants of these children have been estimated at five million, contributing to Canada's identity as the "country of the abandoned". Offers of free land attracted farmers from Central and Eastern Europe to the prairies, as well as large numbers of Americans who settled to a great extent in Alberta. Several immigrant groups settled in sufficient densities to create communities of a sufficient size to exert an influence on Canadian identity, such as Ukrainian Canadians. Canada began to see itself as a country that needed and welcomed people from countries besides its traditional sources of immigrants, accepting Germans, Poles, Dutch, and Scandinavians in large numbers before the First World War.

At the same time, there were concerns regarding immigration from Asian by English Canadians on the Pacific coast. At the time, the Canadian identity did not include non-Europeans. While inexpensive Chinese labour had been needed to complete the transcontinental railway, the completion of the railway led to questions of what to do with the workers who were now no longer needed. Further Chinese immigration was limited and then banned by a series of restrictive and racially motivated dominion statutes. The Komagata Maru incident in 1914 revealed overt hostility towards would-be immigrants, mainly Sikhs from India, who attempted to land in Vancouver.

=== 20th century ===
War bond posters, 1918

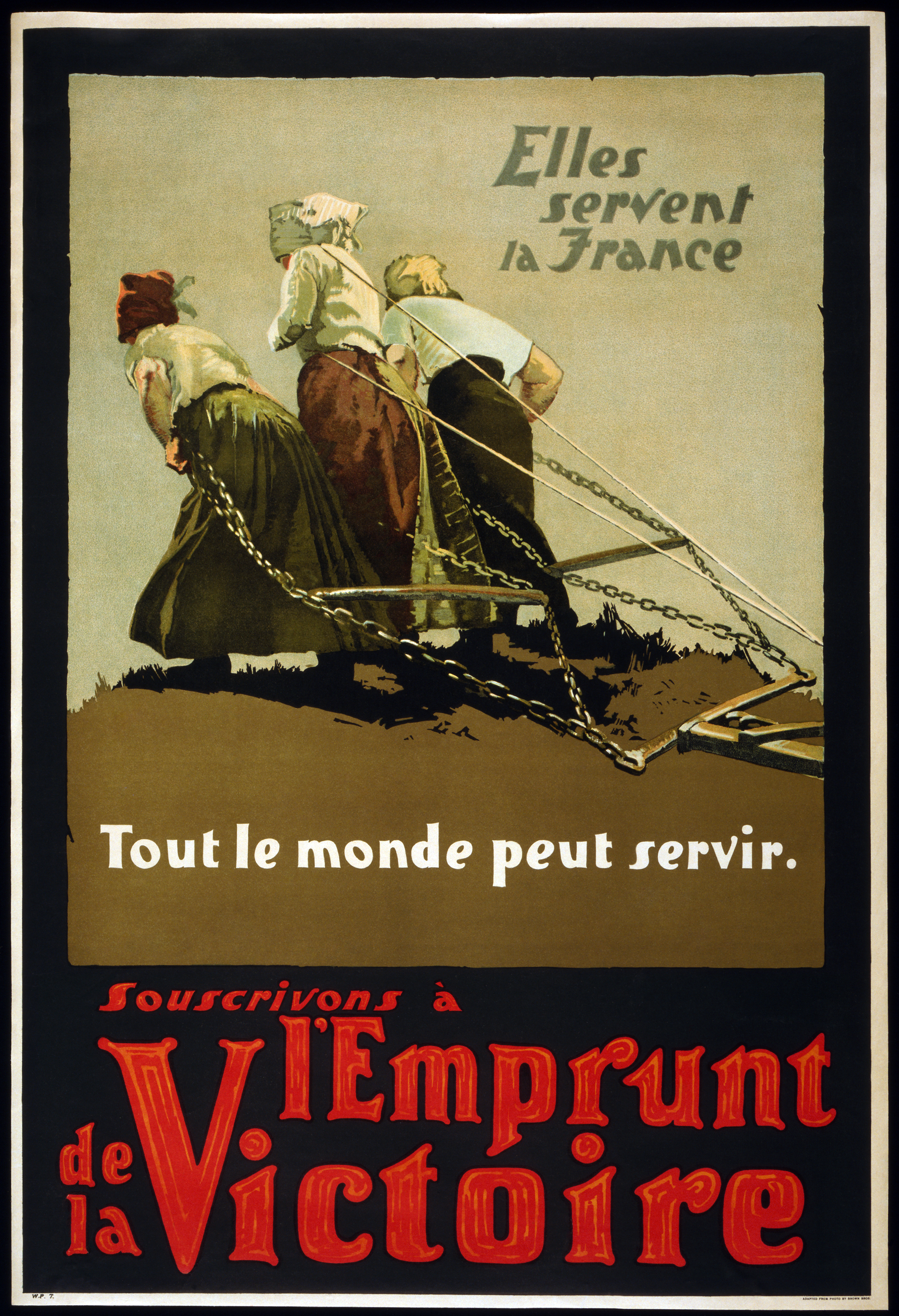
Canadian victory bond poster in French. Depicts three French women pulling a plow that had been constructed for horses and men. Lithograph, adapted from a photograph.

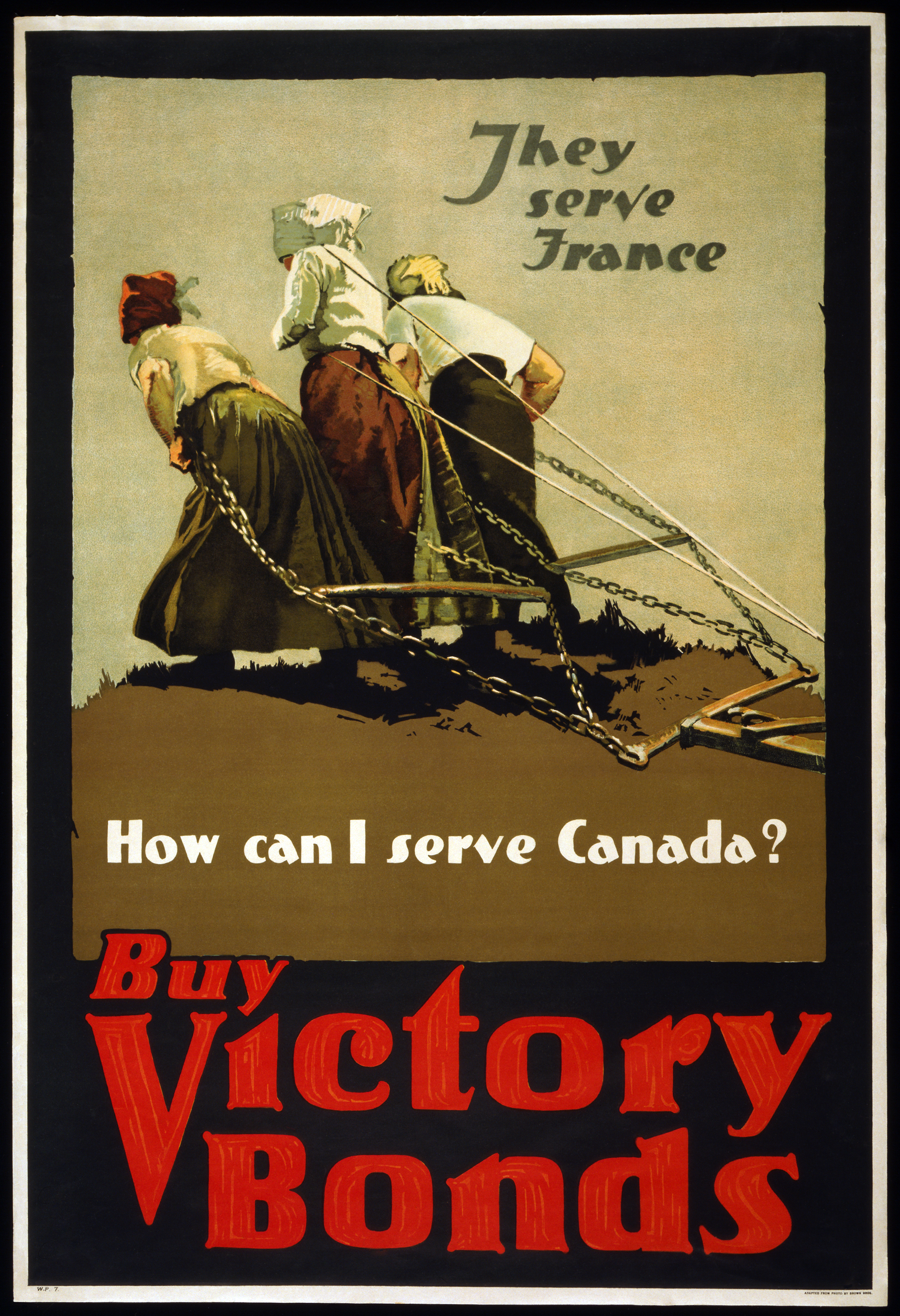
The same poster in English, with subtle differences in text. The French version roughly translates as 'All the world can serve' or 'Everyone can serve' and 'Let's buy victory bonds.'

The main crisis regarding Canadian identity came in World War I. Canadians of British heritage were strongly in favour of the war effort, while those of French heritage, especially in Quebec, showed far less interest. A series of political upheavals ensued, especially the Conscription Crisis of 1917. Simultaneously, the role of immigrants as loyal Canadians was contested, with large numbers of men of German or Ukrainian heritage temporarily stripped of voting rights or incarcerated in camps. The war helped define separate political identities for the two groups, and permanently alienated Quebec and the Conservative Party.

During this period, World War I helped to establish a separate Canadian identity among Anglophoners, especially through the military experiences of the Battle of Vimy Ridge and the Battle of Passchendaele and the intense homefront debates on patriotism. (A similar crisis, though much less intense, erupted in World War II.)

In the 1920s, the Dominion of Canada achieved greater independence from Britain, notably in the Statute of Westminster in 1931. It remained part of the larger Commonwealth but played an independent role in the League of Nations. As Canada became increasingly independent and sovereign, its primary foreign relationship and point of reference gradually moved to the United States, the superpower with whom it shared a long border and major economic, social and cultural relationships.

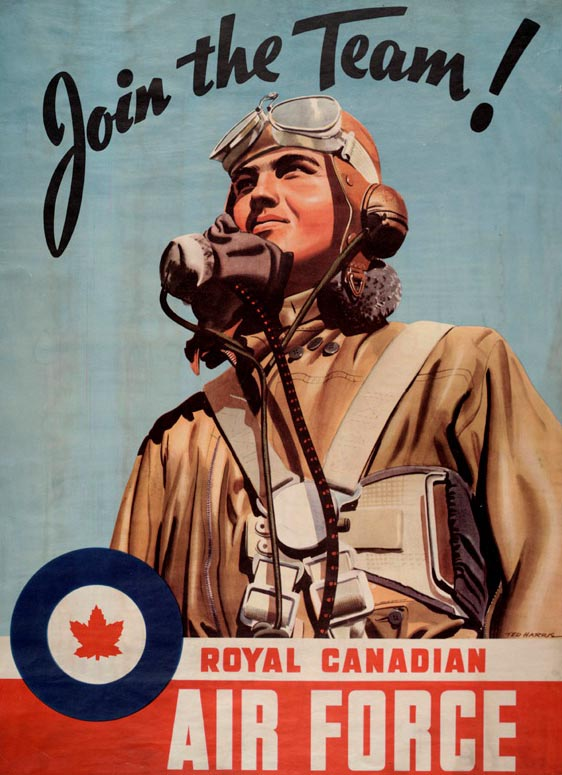
Join the Team! (Royal Canadian Air Force) - used from 1939 till 1945

The Statute of Westminster also gave Canada its own monarchy, which remains in personal union with 14 other countries of the Commonwealth of Nations. However, overt associations with Britain wound down after the end of the Second World War, when Canada established its own citizenship laws in 1947. Throughout the 1960s and 1970s, a number of symbols of the Canadian Crown were either removed completely (such as the Royal Mail) or changed (such as the Royal Arms of Canada), while others were created (for example, the monarch's royal standard).

In the 1960s, Quebec experienced the Quiet Revolution to modernize society from traditional Christian teachings. Québécois nationalists demanded independence and tensions rose until violence erupted during the 1970 October Crisis. In 1976, the Parti Québécois was elected to power in Quebec, with a nationalist vision that included securing French linguistic rights in the province and the pursuit of some form of sovereignty for Quebec, leading to a referendum in Quebec in 1980 on the question of sovereignty-association, which was turned down by 59% of voters. At the patriation of the Canadian constitution in 1982, the Quebec Premier did not agree to the amendment; this led to two unsuccessful attempts to modify the constitution so it would have the Quebec Cabinet's assent and another referendum on Quebec independence in 1995, which lost by a slim majority of 50.6%.

In 1965, Canada adopted the maple leaf flag, after considerable debate and misgivings on the part of a large number of English Canadians. Two years later, the country celebrated the centennial of Confederation and an international exposition in Montreal.

Legislative restrictions on immigration that had favoured British and other European immigrants were removed in the 1960s. By the 1970s immigrants increasingly came from India, Hong Kong, the Caribbean, and Vietnam. Post-war immigrants of all backgrounds tended to settle in the major urban centres, particularly Toronto, Montreal, and Vancouver.

During his tenure in the office (1968–1979, 1980–1984), Prime Minister Pierre Trudeau made social and cultural change his political goal for Canada, including the pursuit of an official policy on bilingualism and plans for significant constitutional change. The west, particularly the oil and gas-producing province of Alberta, opposed many of the policies emanating from central Canada, with the National Energy Program creating considerable antagonism and growing western alienation.

=== Modern times ===
As for the role of history in national identity, the books of Pierre Berton and television series like Canada: A People's History have done much to spark the popular interest of Canadians in their history. Some commentators, such as Cohen, criticize the overall lack of attention paid by Canadians to their own history, noting a disturbing trend to ignore the broad history in favour of narrow focus on specific regions or groups.

It isn't just the schools, the museums and the government that fail us. It is also the professional historians, their books and periodicals. As J.L. Granatstein and Michael Bliss have argued, academic historians in Canada have stopped writing political and national history. They prefer to write labour history, women's history, ethnic history, and regional history, among others, often freighted with a sense of grievance or victimhood. This kind of history has its place, of course, but our history has become so specialized, so segmented, and so narrow that we are missing the national story in a country that has one and needs to hear it.

Much of the debate over contemporary Canadian identity is argued in political terms, and defines Canada as a country defined by its government policies, which are thought to reflect deeper cultural values. To the political philosopher Charles Blattberg, Canada should be conceived as a civic or political community, a community of citizens, one that contains many other kinds of communities within it. These include not only communities of ethnic, regional, religious, civic (the provincial and municipal governments) and civil associational sorts, but also national communities. Blattberg thus sees Canada as a multinational country and so asserts that it contains a number of nations within it. Aside from the various aboriginal First Nations, there is also the nation of francophone Quebecers, that of the anglophones who identify with English Canadian culture, and perhaps that of the Acadians.

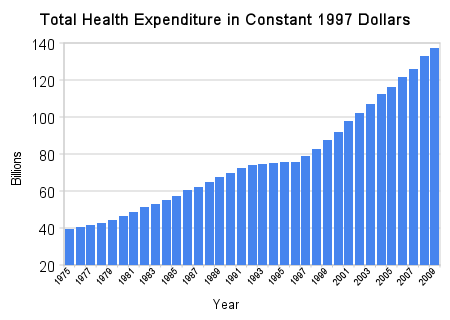
Total Canadian health care expenditures in 1997 dollars from 1975 to 2009

In keeping with this, it is often asserted that Canadian government policies such as publicly funded health care, higher taxation to distribute wealth, outlawing capital punishment, strong efforts to eliminate poverty in Canada, an emphasis on multiculturalism, imposing strict gun control, leniency in regard to drug use, and most recently legalizing same-sex marriage make their country politically and culturally different from the United States.

In a poll that asked what institutions made Canada feel most proud about their country, number one was health care, number two was the Canadian Broadcasting Corporation, and number three was peacekeeping. In a CBC contest to name "The Greatest Canadian", the three highest ranking in descending order were the social democratic politician and father of medicare Tommy Douglas, the legendary cancer activist Terry Fox, and the Liberal prime minister Pierre Trudeau, responsible for instituting Canada's official policies of bilingualism and multiculturalism, which suggested that their voters valued left-of-centre political leanings and community involvement.

Most of Canada's recent prime ministers have been from Quebec, and thus have tried to improve relations with the province with a number of tactics, notably official bilingualism which required the provision of a number of services in both official languages and, among other things, required that all commercial packaging in Canada be printed in French and English. Prime Minister Pierre Trudeau's first legislative push was to implement the Royal Commission on Bilingualism within the Official Languages Act in 1969. Again, while this bilingualism is a notable feature to outsiders, the plan has been less than warmly embraced by many English Canadians some of whom resent the extra administrative costs and the requirement of many key federal public servants to be fluently bilingual. Despite the widespread introduction of French-language classes throughout Canada, very few anglophones are truly bilingual outside of Quebec. Pierre Trudeau in regards to uniformity stated:

Uniformity is neither desirable nor possible in a country the size of Canada. We should not even be able to agree upon the kind of Canadian to choose as a model, let alone persuade most people to emulate it. There are few policies potentially more disastrous for Canada than to tell all Canadians that they must be alike. There is no such thing as a model or ideal Canadian. What could be more absurd than the concept of an "all-Canadian" boy or girl? A society which emphasizes uniformity is one which creates intolerance and hate.

In 2013, more than 90 percent of polled Canadians believed that the Canadian Charter of Rights and Freedoms and the national flag were the top symbols of Canadian identity. As Professor Alan Cairns noted about the Canadian Charter of Rights and Freedoms, "the initial federal government premise was on developing a pan-Canadian identity"'. Pierre Trudeau himself later wrote in his Memoirs (1993) that "Canada itself" could now be defined as a "society where all people are equal and where they share some fundamental values based upon freedom", and that all Canadians could identify with the values of liberty and equality.

=== Migration to Canada ===
Canada was the home for 'American' British Loyalists during and following the American Revolution, making much of Canada distinct in its unwillingness to embrace republicanism and populist democracy during the nineteenth century. Canada was also the destination for slaves from America via the Underground Railroad (the 'North Star' as heralded by Martin Luther King Jr.); Canada was the refuge for American Vietnam draft-dodgers during the turbulent 1960s.

In response to a declining birth rate, Canada has increased the per capita immigration rate to one of the highest in the world.

== Outsider perceptions ==
A very common expression of Canadian identity is to ridicule American ignorance of things Canadian.

During his years with This Hour Has 22 Minutes, comic Rick Mercer produced a recurring segment, Talking to Americans. Petty says, the segment "was extraordinarily popular and was initiated by viewer demand." Mercer would pose as a journalist in an American city and ask passers-by for their opinions on a fabricated Canadian news story. Some of the "stories" for which he solicited comment included the legalization of staplers, the coronation of King Svend, the border dispute between Quebec and Chechnya, the campaign against the Toronto Polar Bear Hunt, and the reconstruction of the historic "Peter Mann's Bridge". During the 2000 election in the United States, Mercer successfully staged a Talking to Americans segment in which presidential candidate George W. Bush gratefully accepted news of his endorsement by Canadian prime minister "Jean Poutine".

While Canadians may dismiss comments that they do not find appealing or stereotypes that are patently ridiculous, Andrew Cohen believes that there is a value to considering what foreigners have to say: "Looking at Canadians through the eyes of foreigners, we get a sense of how they see us. They say so much about us: that we are nice, hospitable, modest, blind to our achievements. That we are obedient, conservative, deferential, colonial and complex, particularly so. That we are fractious, envious, geographically impossible and politically improbable." Cohen refers in particular to the analyses of the French historian André Siegfried, the Irish born journalist and novelist Brian Moore or the Canadian-born American journalist Andrew H. Malcolm.

== French Canadians and identity in English Canada ==
The Canadian philosopher and writer John Ralston Saul has expressed the view that the French fact in Canada is central to Canadian, and particularly to English Canadian identity:

It cannot be repeated enough that Quebec and, more precisely, francophone Canada is at the very heart of the Canadian mythology. I don't mean that it alone constitutes the heart, which is after all a complex place. But it is at the heart and no multiple set of bypass operations could rescue that mythology if Quebec were to leave. Separation is therefore a threat of death to anglophone Canada's whole sense of itself, of its self-respect, of its role as a constituent part of a nation, of the nature of the relationship between citizens."

Many Canadians believe that the relationship between the English and French languages is a central or defining aspect of the Canadian experience. Canada's Official Languages Commissioner (the federal government official charged with monitoring the two languages) has stated, "[I]n the same way that race is at the core of what it means to be American and at the core of an American experience and class is at the core of British experience, I think that language is at the core of Canadian experience."

== Aboriginal Canadians and Canadian identity ==
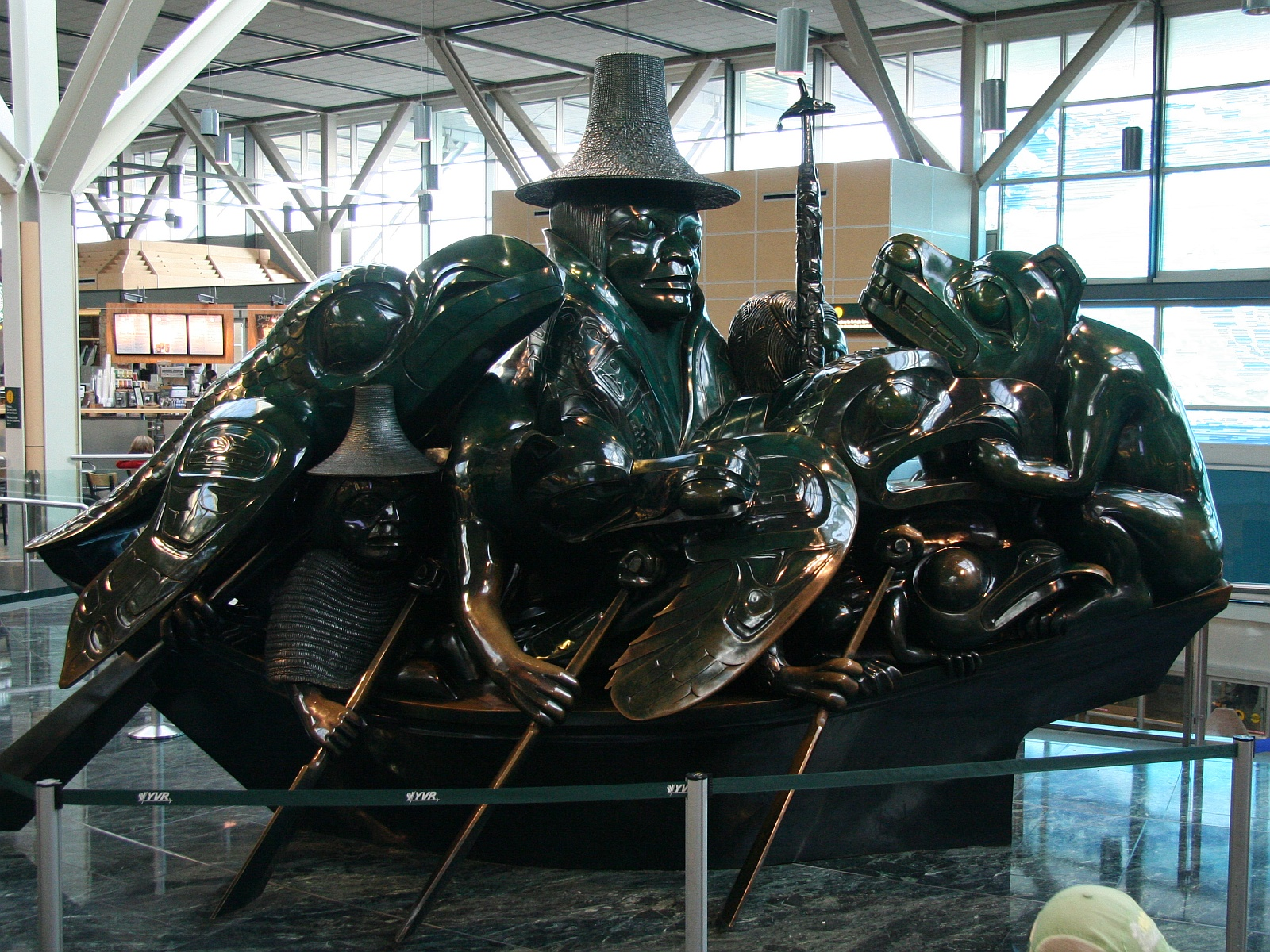
The Spirit of Haida Gwaii, sculpture by Bill Reid in Vancouver Airport

Saul argues that Canadian identity is founded not merely on the relationship built of French/English pragmatic compromises and cooperation but rests in fact on a triangular foundation which includes, significantly, Canada's aboriginal peoples. From the reliance of French and later English explorers on Native knowledge of the country, to the development of the indigenous Métis society on the Prairies which shaped what would become Canada, and the military response to their resistance to annexation by Canada, indigenous peoples were originally partners and players in laying the foundations of Canada. Individual aboriginal leaders, such as Joseph Brant or Tecumseh have long been viewed as heroes in Canada's early battles with the United States and Saul identifies Gabriel Dumont as the real leader of the North-West Rebellion, although overshadowed by the better-known Louis Riel. While the dominant culture tended to dismiss or marginalize First Nations to a large degree, individual artists such as the British Columbia painter Emily Carr, who depicted the totem poles and other carvings of the Northwest Coast peoples, helped turn the then largely ignored and undervalued culture of the first peoples into iconic images "central to the way Canadians see themselves". First Nations art and iconography are now routinely integrated into public space intended to represent Canada, such as The Great Canoe", a sculpture by Haida artist Bill Reid in the courtyard of the Canadian embassy in Washington, D.C., and its copy, The Spirit of Haida Gwaii, at the apex of the main hall in the Vancouver Airport.

=== War of 1812 ===
The War of 1812 is often celebrated in Ontario as a British victory for what would become Canada in 1867. The Canadian government spent $28 million on three years of bicentennial events, exhibits, historic sites, re-enactments, and a new national monument. The official goal was to make Canadians aware that:

- Canada would not exist had the American invasion of 1812–15 been successful.
- The end of the war laid the foundation for Confederation and the emergence of Canada as a free and independent nation.
- Under the Crown, Canada's society retained its linguistic and ethnic diversity, in contrast to the greater conformity demanded by the American Republic.

In a 2012 poll, 25% of all Canadians ranked their victory in the War of 1812 as the second most important part of their identity after free health care (53%).

Canadian historians in recent decades look at the war as a defeat for the First Nations of Canada, and also for the merchants of Montreal (who lost the fur trade of the Michigan-Minnesota area). The British had a long-standing goal of building a pro-British Indian barrier state in the American Midwest. They demanded a neutral Indian state at the peace conference in 1814 but failed to gain any of it because they had lost control of the region in the Battle of Lake Erie and the Battle of the Thames in 1813, where Tecumseh was killed. The British then abandoned their Indian allies south of the lakes. The royal elite of (what is now) Ontario gained much more power in the aftermath and used that power to repel the idea of American republicanism, especially in the areas of southern Ontario settled by American immigrants. Many of those settlers returned to the states and were replaced by immigrants from Britain who were imperial-minded. W. L. Morton says the war was a "stalemate" but the Americans "did win the peace negotiations." Arthur Ray says the war made "matters worse for the native people" as they lost military and political power. Bumsted says the war was a stalemate, but regarding the Indians "was a victory for the American expansionists." Thompson and Randall say "the War of 1812's real losers were the Native peoples who had fought as Britain's ally." On the other hand, the "1812 Great Canadian Victory Party will bring the War of 1812...to life," promised the sponsors of a festival in Toronto in November 2009.

== Multiculturalism and identity ==
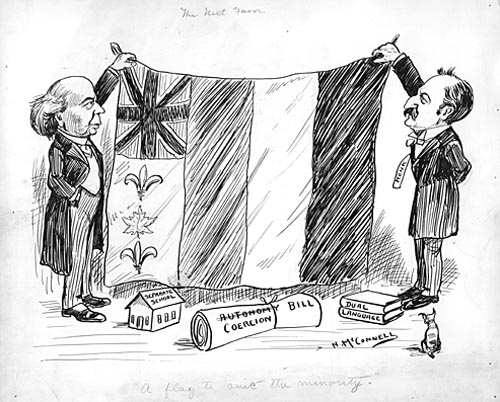
Political cartoon on Canada's multicultural identity, from 1911

Multiculturalism and inter-ethnic relations in Canada is relaxed and tolerant, allowing ethnic or linguistic particularism to exist unquestioned. In metropolitan areas such as Toronto and Vancouver, there is often a strong sense that multiculturalism is a normal and respectable expression of being Canadian. Canada is also considered a mosaic because of the multi-culturalism.

Supporters of Canadian multiculturalism will also argue that cultural appreciation of ethnic and religious diversity promotes a greater willingness to tolerate political differences, and multiculturalism is often cited as one of Canada's significant accomplishments and a key distinguishing element of Canadian identity. Richard Gwyn has suggested that "tolerance" has replaced "loyalty" as the touchstone of Canadian identity.

On the other hand, critics of Canada's multiculturalism argue that the country's "timid" attitude towards the assimilation of immigrants has actually weakened, not strengthened Canada's national identity through factionalism. Columnist and author Richard Gwyn expresses concern that Canada's sense of self may become so weak that it might vanish altogether. The indulgent attitude taken towards cultural differences is perhaps a side effect of the vexed histories of French-English and Aboriginal-settler relations, which have created a need for a civic national identity, as opposed to one based on some homogenous cultural ideal. On the other hand, concerns have been raised of the danger that "ethnic nationalism will trump civic nationalism" and that Canada will leap "from colony to post-national cosmopolitan" without giving Canadians a fair chance of ever finding a centre of gravity or certain sense of Canadian identity.

For John Ralston Saul, Canada's approach of not insisting on a single national mythology or identity is not necessarily a sign of the country's weakness, but rather its greatest success, signalling a rejection of or evolution from the European mono-cultural concept of a national identity to something far more "soft" and less complex:

The essential characteristic of the Canadian public mythology is its complexity. To the extent that it denies the illusion of simplicity, it is a reasonable facsimile of reality. That makes it a revolutionary reversal of the standard nation-state myth. To accept our reality—the myth of complexity—is to live out of sync with élites in other countries, particularly those in the business and academic communities.

In January 2007, Prime Minister Stephen Harper advised the creation of a new sub-ministerial cabinet portfolio with the title Canadian Identity for the first time in Canadian history, naming Jason Kenney to the position of Secretary of State for Multiculturalism and Canadian Identity.

== The role of Canadian social policy and identity ==
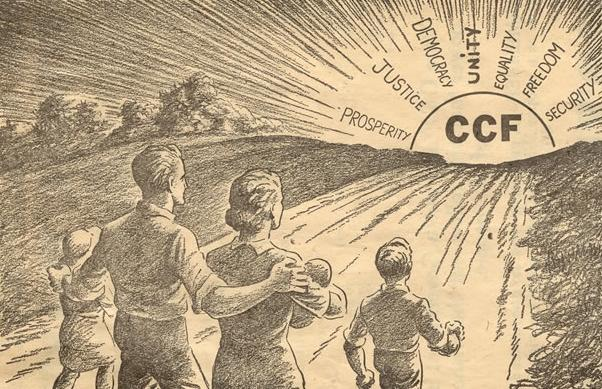
"Towards the Dawn!" — a 1930s poster from Saskatchewan promoting the Co-operative Commonwealth Federation

Critics of the idea of a fundamentally "liberal Canada" such as David Frum argue that the Canadian drive towards a more noticeably leftist political stance is largely due to the increasing role that Quebec plays in the Canadian government (three of the last five elected Prime Ministers have been Quebecers, four if one includes Ontarian-born Paul Martin). Quebec historically was the most conservative, religious and traditional part of Canada. Since the Quiet Revolution of the 1960s, however, it has become the most secular and social democratic region of Canada. However, it is noteworthy that many Western provinces (particularly Saskatchewan and British Columbia) also have reputations as supporting leftist and social democratic policies. For example, Saskatchewan is one of the few provinces (all in the West) to reelect social democratic governments and is the cradle of the Co-operative Commonwealth Federation and its successor the New Democratic Party. Much of the energy of the early Canadian feminist movement occurred in Manitoba.

By contrast, the Conservative provincial government of Alberta has frequently quarrelled with federal administrations perceived to be dominated by "eastern liberal elites." Part of this is due to what Albertans feel were federal intrusions on provincial jurisdictions such as the National Energy Program and other attempts to 'interfere' with Albertan oil resources.

== Distinctly Canadian ==
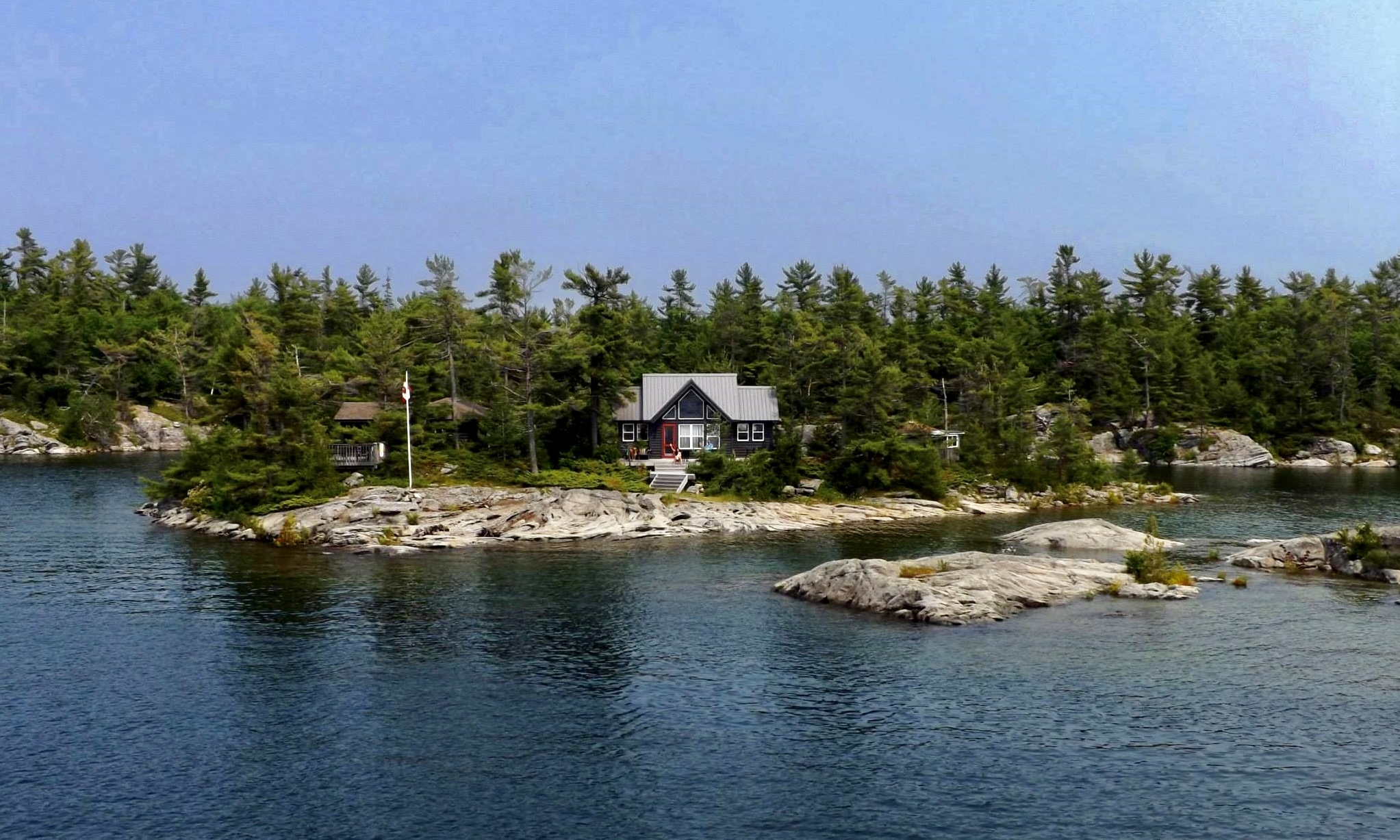
Luxury cottage at Thirty Thousand Islands in Georgian Bay, part of the Great Lakes cottage country, in Ontario, Canada

- "Roughing it" in cottage country a nostalgic "wilderness" activity where families connect with nature and pass-down traditions, has long been a part of Canadian identity, representing a shared cultural lifestyle.
- In 1971, Peter Gzowski of CBC Radio's This Country in the Morning held a competition whose goal was to compose the conclusion to the phrase: "As Canadian as..." The winning entry was "... possible, under the circumstances." It was sent in to the program by Heather Scott.
- Pierre Berton, a Canadian journalist and novelist, has been attributed with the quote "A Canadian is someone who knows how to make love in a canoe without tipping it", although Berton himself denied that he ever actually said or wrote this.

== See also ==
- Culture of Canada
- Canadian nationalism
- Canadian sovereignty
- Cultural cringe
