= CPR Festivals =

Canadian series of music and folk arts festivals

The Canadian Pacific Railway Festivals, usually simplified to CPR Festivals, were a series of music and folk arts festivals sponsored by the Canadian Pacific Railway (CPR) between 1927 and 1931. The festivals were organized by the writer and publicist John Murray Gibbon who was the publicity agent for the CPR. The first of these festivals was the Canadian Folk Song and Handicraft Festival which was held in Quebec City in 1927. That festival was revived in Quebec City in 1928 and then moved to Winnipeg in 1931. The CPR sponsored the Sea Music Festival which was held first in Vancouver in 1929, and then in Victoria, British Columbia in 1930. Other festivals sponsored by the CPR included the Highland Gathering and Scottish Festival, the Old English Yuletide Festival, the Great West Canadian Folk-Dance, Folk-Song and Handicraft Festival, and the English Music Festival. The festivals were unusually progressive for the period in which they occurred.
