= Canadian Multiculturalism Act =

Law of Canada

Canadian Multiculturalism Act _{Loi sur le multiculturalisme canadien}

Parliament of Canada
- Long title: An Act for the preservation and enhancement of multiculturalism in Canada Loi sur le maintien et la valorisation du multiculturalisme au Canada
- Citation: Canadian Multiculturalism Act
- Enacted by: Parliament of Canada
- Assented to: July 21, 1988

The Canadian Multiculturalism Act (French: Loi sur le multiculturalisme canadien) is a law of Canada, passed in 1988, that aims to preserve and enhance cultural diversity, i.e. multiculturalism, in Canada.

== Background ==
On 8 October 1971, Prime Minister Pierre Elliott Trudeau declared in the House of Commons of Canada that, after much deliberation, the policies of bilingualism and multiculturalism would be implemented in Canada. In other words, the Government of Canada would recognize and respect its society including its diversity in languages, customs, religions, and so on. According to Immigration, Refugees and Citizenship Canada (IRCC): "In 1971, Canada was the first country in the world to adopt multiculturalism as an official policy." One result of this policy statement was the Canadian Multiculturalism Act of 1985.

In 1982, multiculturalism was recognized by section 27 of the Canadian Charter of Rights and Freedoms, and the Canadian Multiculturalism Act was subsequently enacted by Prime Minister Brian Mulroney.

== Details ==
The preamble of the act declares that,

WHEREAS the Constitution of Canada provides that every individual is equal before and under the law and has the right to the equal protection and benefit of the law without discrimination and that everyone has the freedom of conscience, religion, thought, belief, opinion, expression, peaceful assembly and association and guarantees those rights and freedoms equally to male and female persons ...

The multiculturalism policy allows citizens to practice their religions and keep their identities without the fear of official persecution. It is believed by some that without this fear, Canadians are more willing to accept different cultures. The policy, therefore, emphasizes a mutual respect between ethnicities and also acceptance of one's personal beliefs.

This policy guarantees equality before the law and for pursuing opportunities whether personal, career, or in any other field. This means anyone of any race or ethnic origin is capable of pursuing his or her interests without persecution. Canadian law, as a result, reflects many of these rights and belief as they guaranteed to all men and women. All of these rights are guaranteed in the Canadian Charter of Rights and Freedoms which is part of the Canadian Constitution.

The Parole Board of Canada writes that the act has two fundamental principles:

- All citizens are equal and have the freedom to preserve, enhance and share their cultural heritage.
- Multiculturalism promotes the full and equitable participation of individuals and communities of all origins in all aspects of Canadian society.

The act binds the federal government and its institutions to encourage, facilitate, assist and undertake several high-minded goals. The Minister may also enter into agreements with provincial and foreign governments to promote these goals. Other ministers may enter into agreements with the provinces. The "Canadian multiculturalism advisory committee" is established in Section 7, and the Minister is charged with the annual composition of a report on the operation of the act.

== Content ==
The Canadian Multiculturalism Act affirms the policy of the Government of Canada to ensure that every Canadian receives equal treatment by the government which respects and celebrates diversity. The act also:

- recognizes Canada's multicultural heritage and that this heritage must be protected
- recognizes Aboriginal rights
- recognizes English and French remain the only official languages but that other languages may be used
- recognizes equality rights regardless of race, religion, etc.
- recognizes minorities' rights to enjoy their cultures.

=== Section 3 ===
Section 3 (1) of the act states:

It is hereby declared to be the policy of the Government of Canada to

(a) recognize and promote the understanding that multiculturalism reflects the cultural and racial diversity of Canadian society and acknowledges the freedom of all members of Canadian society to preserve, enhance and share their cultural heritage

(b) recognize and promote the understanding that multiculturalism is a fundamental characteristic of the Canadian heritage and identity and that it provides an invaluable resource in the shaping of Canada’s future

(c) promote the full and equitable participation of individuals and communities of all origins in the continuing evolution and shaping of all aspects of Canadian society and assist them in the elimination of any barrier to that participation

(d) recognize the existence of communities whose members share a common origin and their historic contribution to Canadian society, and enhance their development

(e) ensure that all individuals receive equal treatment and equal protection under the law, while respecting and valuing their diversity

(f) encourage and assist the social, cultural, economic and political institutions of Canada to be both respectful and inclusive of Canada’s multicultural character

(g) promote the understanding and creativity that arise from the interaction between individuals and communities of different origins

(h) foster the recognition and appreciation of the diverse cultures of Canadian society and promote the reflection and the evolving expressions of those cultures

(i) preserve and enhance the use of languages other than English and French, while strengthening the status and use of the official languages of Canada; and

(j) advance multiculturalism throughout Canada in harmony with the national commitment to the official languages of Canada.

== See also ==
- Cultural mosaic
- Just society
- Multicultural media in Canada
- Multiculturalism in Canada
