= Cultural mosaic =

Co-existence of ethnic groups, languages and cultures

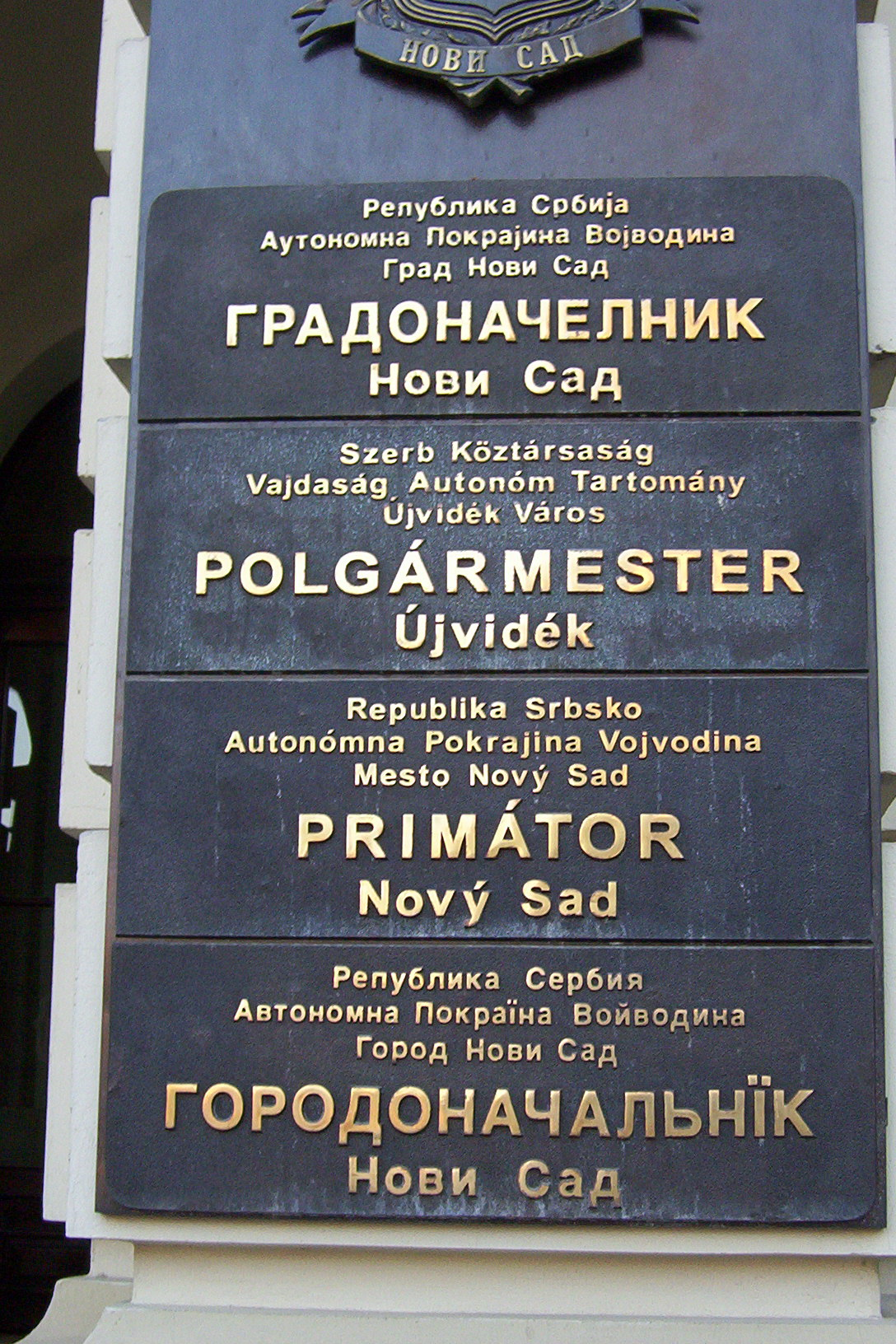
Multi-lingual sign outside the mayor's office in Novi Sad, written in the four official languages of the city: Serbian, Hungarian, Slovak, and Pannonian Rusyn.

Cultural mosaic (French: "la mosaïque culturelle") is a metaphor for a society composed of diverse ethnic, linguistic, and cultural groups that are encouraged to maintain their unique identities while coexisting. The idea of a cultural mosaic is intended to suggest a form of multiculturalism as seen in Canada, that differs from other systems such as the melting pot, which is often used to describe nations like the United States' assimilation.

== Overview ==
An ethnocultural profile of Canada prepared by Statistics Canada describes a nation that, at the outset of the 21st century, has become progressively more and more multi-ethnic and multicultural. The introduction to the report describes this in the following way:

Immigration to Canada over the past 100 years has shaped Canada, with each new wave of immigrants adding to the nation’s ethnic and cultural composition. Half a century ago, most immigrants came from Europe. Now most newcomers are from Asia. As a result, the number of visible minorities in Canada is growing. And, Canadians listed more than 200 ethnic groups in answering the 2001 Census question on ethnic ancestry, reflecting a varied, rich cultural mosaic as the nation started the new millennium. In the 2016 Census, there were more than 250 ethnic groups in Canada.

== Origin and use of the term ==
Victoria Hayward described the cultural changes of the Canadian Prairies as a "mosaic" as early as the 1920s:

New Canadians, representing many places and widely separated sections of Old Europe, have contributed to the Prairie Provinces a variety in the way of Church Architecture. Cupolas and domes distinctly Eastern, almost Turkish, startle one above the tops of Manitoba maples or the bush of the river banks. These architectural figures of the landscape, apart altogether of their religious significance, are centers where crossing the threshold on Sundays, one has the opportunity of hearing Swedish music, or the rich, deep chanting of the Russian responses; and of viewing at close hand the artistry that goes to make up the interior appointments of these churches transplanted from the East to the West…It is indeed a mosaic of vast dimensions and great breadth, essayed of the Prairie.

Another early use of the term mosaic to refer to Canadian society was by John Murray Gibbon, in his 1938 book Canadian Mosaic. Gibbon clearly disapproved of the American melting-pot concept. He saw the melting pot as a process by which immigrants and their descendants were encouraged to cut off ties with their countries and cultures of origin so as to assimilate into the American way of life.

In 1965, John Porter published his influential sociological study, The Vertical Mosaic: An Analysis of Social Class and Power in Canada. The study examined equality of opportunity and the exercise of power by bureaucratic, economic, and political elites in Canada, with Porter arguing that "not unlike other western industrial nations", Canada relied "on its elite groups to make major decisions and to determine the shape and direction of its development." In their work, Porter also argues that certain ethnic groups tended to fare better than others in regards to measures of income, education, and health than others, and as such classified them as "elite groups", who tended to be overrepresented among Canada's elites in government, economic and political spheres.

Porter’s findings have been tested in several studies since 1965 and have been modified slightly. For example, the economic disparity between ethnic groups has narrowed somewhat and Francophones are better represented in politics and government. However, the socio-economic elites in Canada remain dominated by people of British origin.

== Influence on multiculturalism policy ==
Since the beginning of the 20th century, Canada has been one of the world's major immigrant-receiving societies. Until the 1960s immigrants were expected to assimilate into the mainstream society. Arriving as it did during a time of social upheaval, Porter's work had a marked influence on Canadian social policy. The view of Canada as a mosaic of cultures became the basis for the Trudeau government's multiculturalism policies in the early 1970s.

The Canadian government established the Official Multiculturalism Act in 1971 and appointed a minister responsible for multiculturalism in 1972. In 1973, a Canadian Multiculturalism Council was established, along with a Multiculturalism Branch within the Department of the Secretary of State.

== Criticism ==
The "cultural mosaic" theory is not without critics. Some commentators, such as The Globe and Mail's Jeffrey Simpson and Carleton University journalism professor Andrew Cohen, have argued that the entire melting pot or mosaic dynamic is largely an imagined concept and that there remains little measurable evidence that American or Canadian immigrants as collective groups can be proven to be more or less "assimilated" or "multicultural" than each other.

== See also ==
- Canadian values
- Cultural rights
- Just society
- Monument to Multiculturalism
- Multiculturalism in Canada
- Multicultural media in Canada
- Multiculturalism in Australia
- Salad bowl
