= Canadian Mosaic =

Book by John Murray Gibbon

- Author: John Murray Gibbon
- Publisher: McClelland & Stewart
- Publication date: 1938
- Publication place: Canada

Canadian Mosaic is a book by John Murray Gibbon, published in 1938. Gibbon's book, the full title of which is Canadian Mosaic: The Making of a Northern Nation, heralded a new way of thinking about immigrants that was to shape Canadian immigration policy in the latter part of the 20th century. The idea of a mosaic, in which each cultural group retained a distinct identity and still contributed to the nation as a whole, was in contrast to the melting pot, a popular metaphor for the more assimilationist American approach to immigration.

The idea of a mosaic of cultures forming a nation was adopted by Canadian sociologist John Porter in his study of social class, entitled Vertical Mosaic: An Analysis of Social Class and Power in Canada. The mosaic theme became a part of Canadian multiculturalism policy in the 1970s, which envisioned Canada as a "cultural mosaic".

Awards
Preceded by My Discovery of the West	Governor General's Award for English language non-fiction recipient 1938	Succeeded by Confessions of an Immigrant's Daughter
