= John Murray Gibbon =

Scottish-Canadian writer and cultural promoter

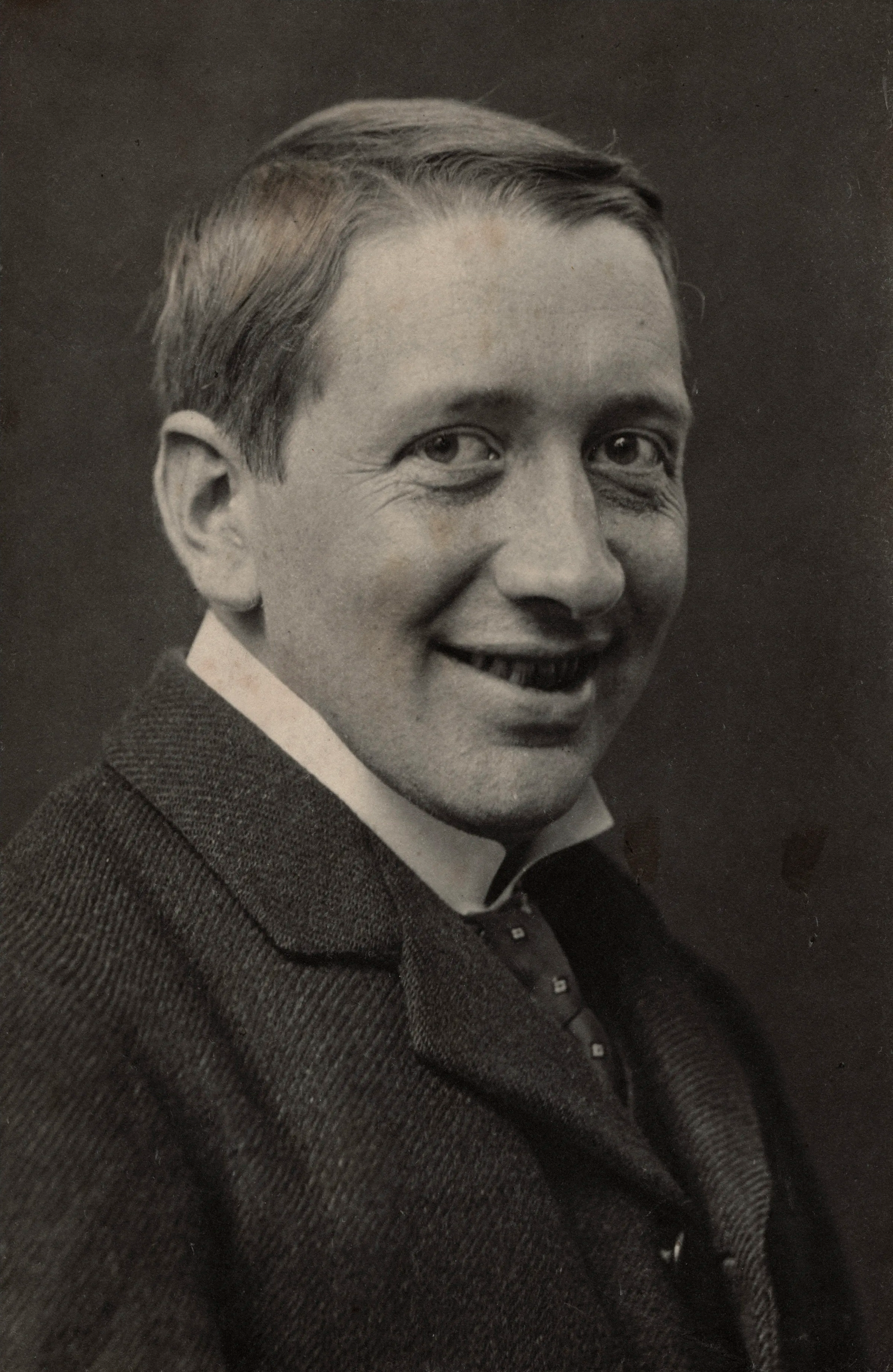
- Portrait by Olive Edis, c. 1900
- Born: April 12, 1875; Ceylon
- Died: July 2, 1952 (aged 77)
- Occupation: Writer

John Murray Gibbon (12 April 1875 – 2 July 1952) was a Scottish-Canadian writer and cultural promoter. He was born in Ceylon on 12 April 1875 the second son of William Duff Gibbon a tea planter and Katherine née Murray. Gibbon was educated at Aberdeen, Oxford and Göttingen universities. He emigrated to Canada in 1913 to work for the Canadian Pacific Railway (CPR). In 1921, he became founding president of the Canadian Authors Association.

A long-time enthusiast of folk culture, Gibbon organized the CPR Festivals; a series of folk and crafts festivals sponsored by the CPR. With Sir Ernest MacMillan, he published the four-volume French Canadian Folk Songs (1928). Histories he wrote included Scots in Canada (1911), Steel of Empire: The Romantic History of the Canadian Pacific (1935), Canadian Mosaic (1938) and two histories of nursing. He also wrote several novels.

Gibbon's work was to have a major impact on the creation of a bilingual, multicultural, national culture. Canadian Mosaic influenced the adoption of the concept of a "cultural mosaic" in the Canadian government's multiculturalism policies. Additionally, Gibbon had a keen interest in horseback riding in the Canadian Rockies and was the founder of the Trail Riders of the Canadian Rockies. (www.trailridevacations.com) in 1923. He was secretary-treasurer of the club for over 30 years. He died at Montreal, Quebec.

== Works ==
- The True Annals Of Fairyland In The Reign Of King Cole [edited], (1909)
- Scots In Canada, (1911)
- Hearts And Faces: The Adventure Of A Soul, (1916)
- Drums Afar, (1918)
- A Canadian Calendar, (1919)
- The Conquering Hero, (1920)
- Pagan Love, (1922)
- Eyes Of A Gypsy, (1926)
- French Canadian Folk Songs [Fr=?] [translated & edited], (1928)
- Canadian Folksongs Old And New [?=?] [translated & edited], (1929)
- Prince Charlie And Flora, (1929)
- Melody And Lyric, From Chaucer To The Cavaliers, (1930)
- The Magic Of Melody, (1933)
- Steel Of Empire:...The Canadian Pacific Railway..., (1935)
- Northland Songs, (1936)
- The Man Comes Down From The Moon, (1937)
- Canadian Mosaic: The Making Of A Northern Nation, (1938)
- Our Old Montreal, (McLelland & Stewart, Toronto, 1938)
- New World Ballads, (1939)
- The New Canadian Loyalists, (1941)
- Pioneer Songs Of Canada, (1941)
- Canada In Song, (1941)
- The Victorian Order Of Nurses For Canada, (1947)
- Three Centuries Of Canadian Nursing [with Mary S MATHEWSON], (1947)
- Canadian Cadences, (1949)
- New Colour For The Canadian Mosaic: The Displaced Person, (1951)
- The Romance Of The Canadian Canoe, (1951)
- Ballads Of BC
