= Cultural amalgamation =

Process of mixing cultures

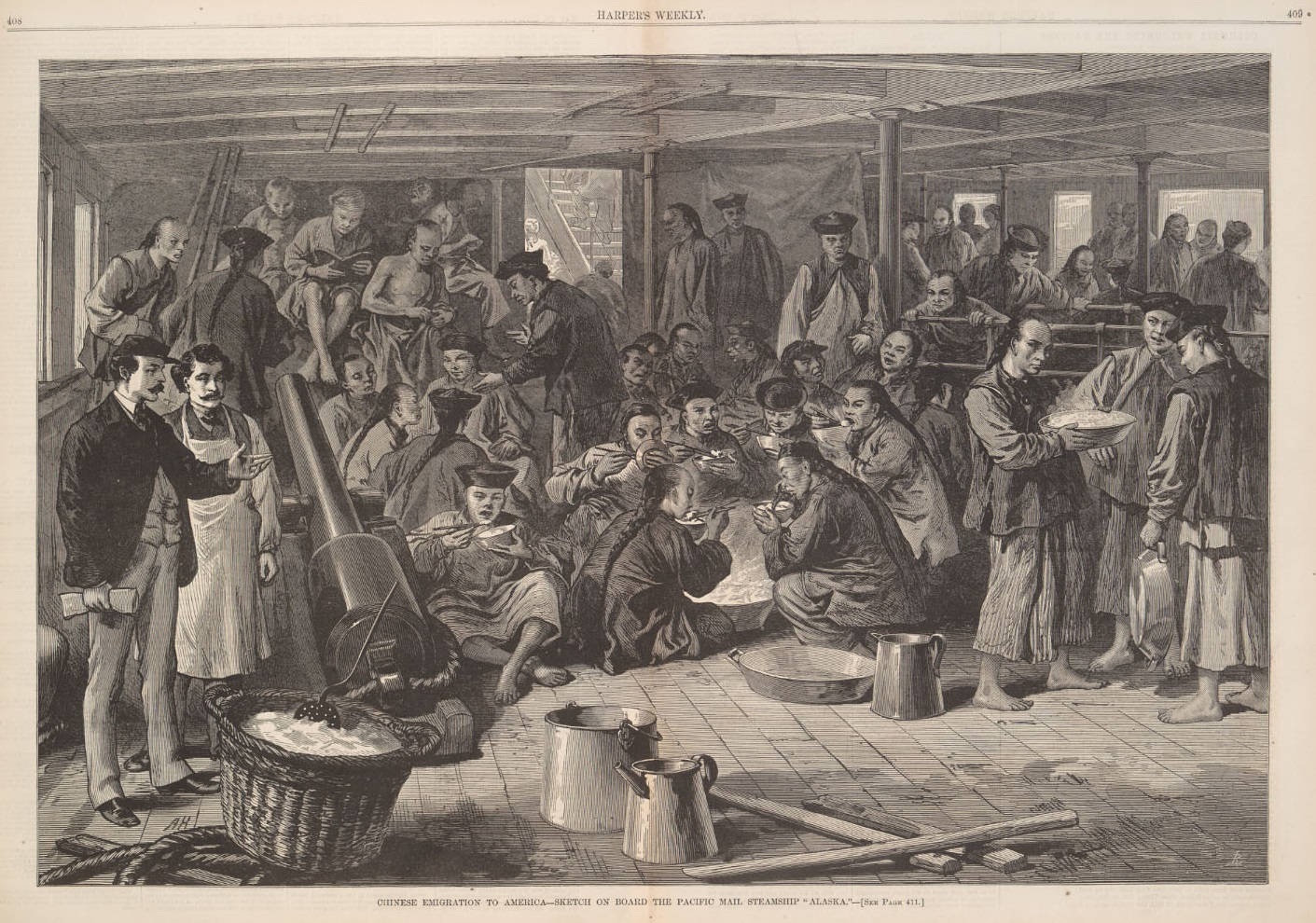
The origins of cultural amalgamation: When people from the Chinese culture meet people from the European culture and greet each other.

Cultural amalgamation refers to the process of mixing two cultures to create a new culture. It is often described as a more balanced type of cultural interaction than the process of cultural assimilation. Cultural amalgamation does not involve one group's culture changing another group's culture (acculturation) or one group adopting another group's culture (assimilation). Instead, a new culture results. This is the origin of cultural amalgamation. It is the ideological equivalent of the melting pot theory.

The term cultural amalgamation is often used in studies on post–civil rights era in the United States and contemporary era to describe the process of multiple cultures blending into a new, unique culture. For instance, the cultural amalgamation process happened with the fall of the Roman empire when the Middle Ages started and Roman Jewish/Christian culture and Germanic tribal cultures mixed with each other in the European continent. In present day, cultural amalgamation occurs with immigration.

== Origins of cultural amalgamation ==
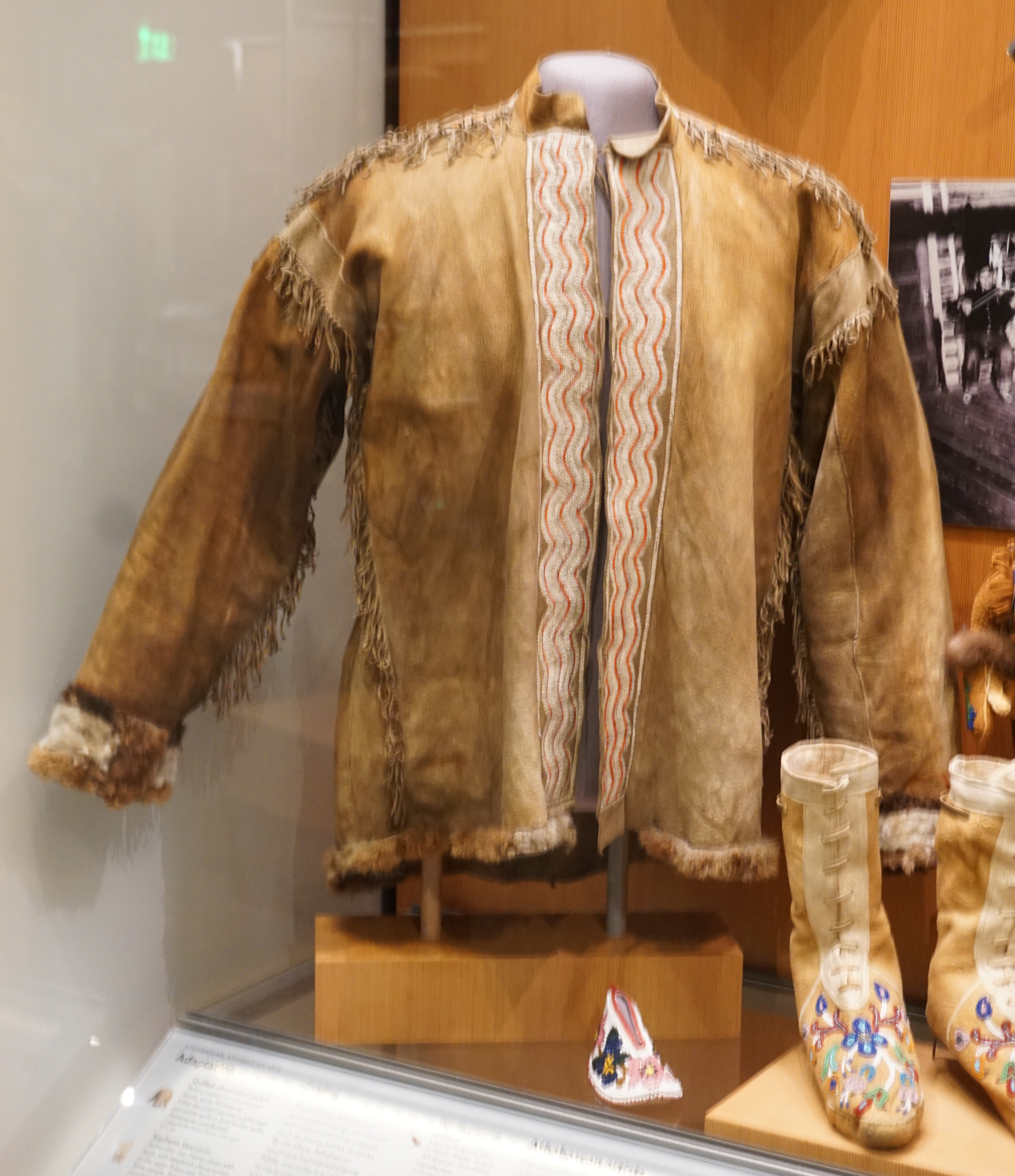
This Athebaskan beaded jacket and foot wear are dated to the 19th Century The beadwork is made of dyed porcupine quills. These items of clothing and footwear would appear authentic to early Europeans who never saw them before.

The origins of cultural amalgamation and its distinction begins the moment individuals from one culture encounter individuals from another culture. Each cultural group and their people who represent their society appear exotic to the other group. There is no expectation for anyone in one culture to sacrifice their unique cultural qualities and attributes for the other distinct culture. Instead, there is an appreciation for the social norms, spirituality, language, artistic expressions, food, clothing and rituals that each group brings into the merge.

Social integration occurs as each individual from their group independently represents their unique culture with a mutual appreciation and respect for each member of the other group and their cultural values. The benefits of the cultural exchange are many as it includes all aspects of the other culture in its entirety.

The cultures then combine their influences and amalgamate without dominating each other. This creates a new social structure dynamic where contributions occur in various areas and forms, and all are equally valued.

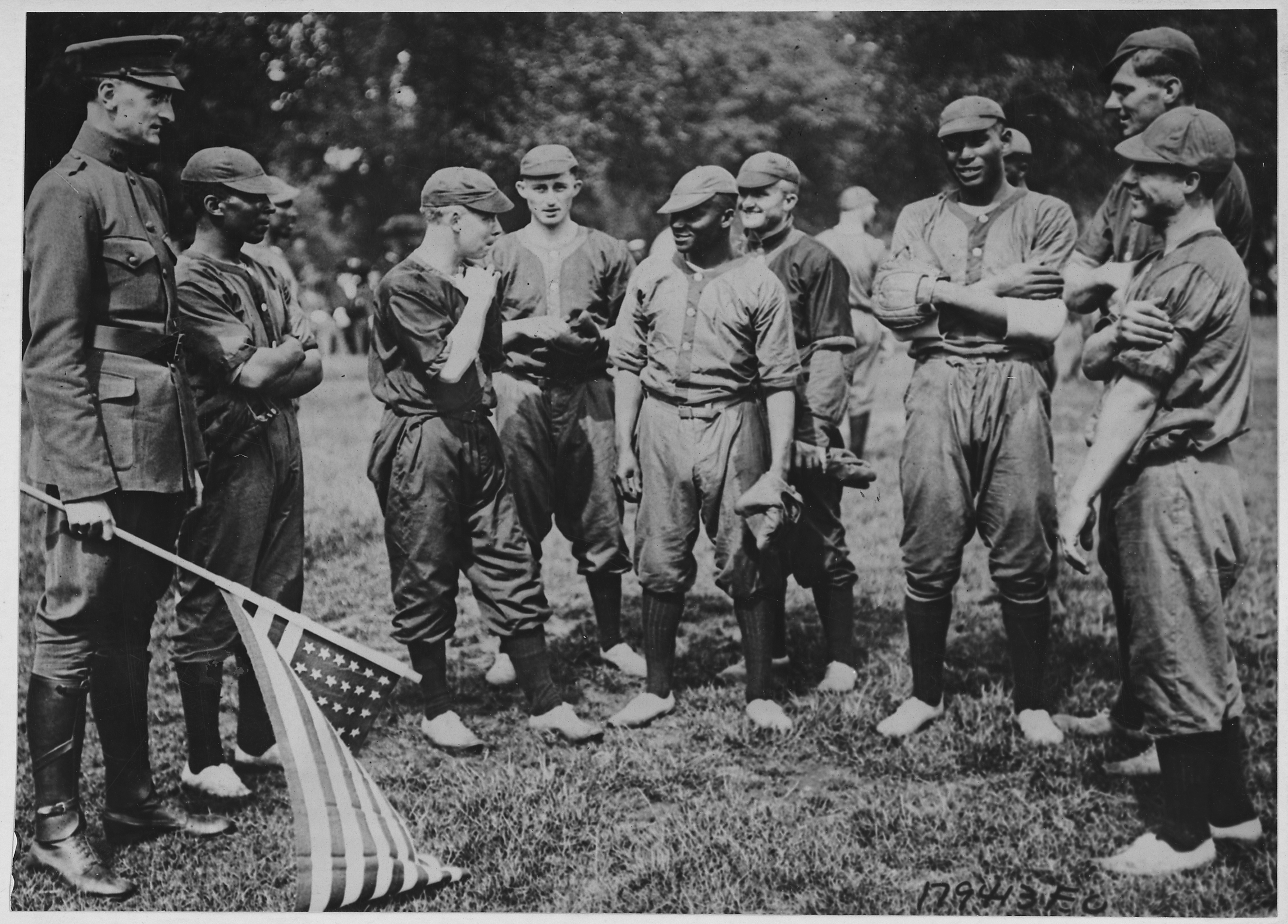
Cultural amalgamation is beneficial and aids in enhancing the life experience of both cultures. In this photo African American play ball with Europeans at Hyde Park, London.

=== Materiality and non-materiality ===
Historically, the practice and process of cultural amalgamation is beneficial and aids in enhancing both cultures. It improves the quality of life for each individual on various levels, including their respective society's materiality and the nonmaterial.

In the social sciences, one aspect of materiality is described as the use of cultural artifacts and how they are incorporated by the receiving culture for their use. The other aspect is the nonmaterial advancements that consist of the various beliefs, creative ideas and attitudes expressed in a society. The value is determined by the type of impact and reception it receives as it is shared with the other culture, and then extended to more broad and diverse cultural groups. The contributions between the two cultures creates an elevated, overall enhancement in the areas of social capital and culture capital for the combined society, which can be highly beneficial. As a result, each group benefits from the other group by sharing their cultural practices, social advances and material advancements in order to develop and establish the new society.

Sociologist Pierre Bourdieu is credited as the social scientist who identified the term social capital, which embodies the following:

- social dynamics
- inventions
- knowledge
- education
- spiritual practices
- language
- artistic expressions
- food
- authentic clothing
- societal laws
- social practices
- social norms

== Pierre Bourdieu’s social and cultural capital ==
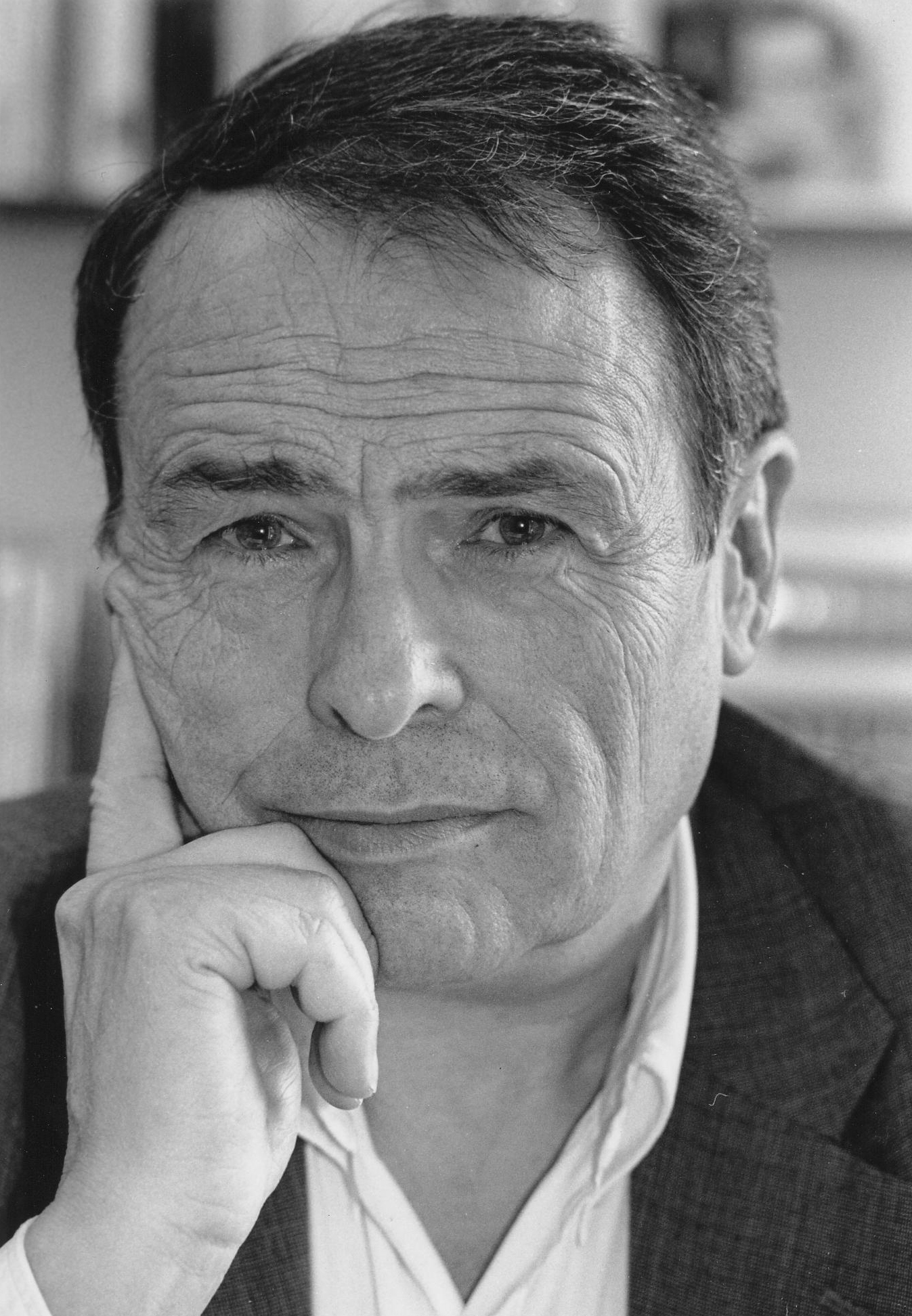
Sociologist Pierre Bourdieu's concept of social and cultural capital embodies both nonmaterial and material attributes.

Sociologist Pierre Bourdieu’s concept of social and cultural capital embodies both nonmaterial and material attributes or assets. In the social sciences, materiality is described as the use of cultural artifacts and how they are incorporated into the receiving culture's use of the new technology.

Pierre Bourdieau in-depthly discussed the concept of social capital and its significance in society while being instrumental in forming the concept as a focal point in his lectures on socialist societies. According to Bourdieau, cultural capital takes the form of material objects when the production and consumption of an objectified form of culture has an energy that influences the other culture. The objectification of the other culture extends beyond the arts or technology as cultural capital. In his view, it is highly influential with regard to what the existing society accepts as their social norms and conduct. It also extends and becomes institutionalized in areas such as education, medicine and law. However, Bourdieu's emphasis about sharing genetics and heritability, also known as miscegenation, as an invisible, prime characteristic of cultural capital is emphasised in his work.

=== Miscegenation ===
The word amalgamation means miscegenation. When different cultural groups come into contact with each other, marriages occur. This in turn creates a genetic mergence through the birth of children. This genetic process, also known as hybridization, results after many generations.

Bourdieu emphasised that the prime characteristic of cultural capital comes in the form of genetics and heritability. Combining DNA creates a source of origin as he felt genetics make a substantial contribution to inter-generational genetics merging to result in population increases. Procreating between two individuals from two isolated and different cultures creates a hybridization state in the resulting children. Bourdieu describes hybridization as a much more subtle, hidden or disguised form for powerful material contributions in comparison to other materialized forms that demonstrate an obvious physical result to attain economic capital gain. The merging of genetics through procreation is when miscegenation occurs with genetic transfer.

== See also ==
- Acculturation
- Cultural appropriation
- Cultural assimilation
- Cultural mosaic
- Cultural pluralism
- Melting Pot
- Successor culture
