= Society of the United States =

Social structure of the United States

A World Values Survey cultural world map, describing the United States as low in "Secular-Rational Values" and high in "Self-Expression Values"

The society of the United States is based on Western culture, and has been developing since long before the United States became a country with its own unique social and cultural characteristics such as dialect, music, arts, social habits, cuisine, and folklore. Today, the United States is a racially and ethnically diverse country as a result of large-scale immigration from many countries throughout its history.

Its chief early influences came from English and Irish settlers of colonial America. British culture, due to colonial ties with Britain that spread the English language, legal system, and other cultural inheritances, had a formative influence. Other important influences came from other parts of Europe.

The United States has often been thought of as a melting pot, but recent developments tend towards cultural diversity, pluralism, and the image of a salad bowl rather than a melting pot. Due to the extent of American culture there are many integrated but unique social subcultures within the United States. The cultural affiliations an individual in the United States may have commonly depend on social class, political orientation, and a multitude of demographic characteristics such as religious background, occupation, and ethnic group membership. The strongest influences on American culture came from northern European cultures, most prominently from Britain, Ireland, and Germany.

== Race and Ancestry ==
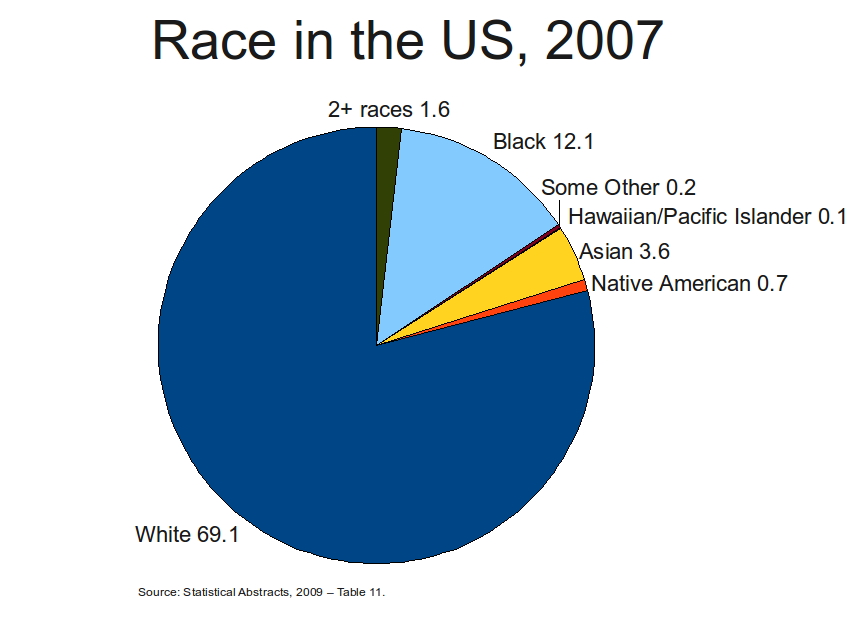
Racial makeup of the US in 2007

Race in the United States is based on physical characteristics and skin color and has played an essential part in shaping American society even before the nation's conception.

Today, the U.S. Department of Commerce's Census Bureau recognizes five races:

- White
- Black or African American
- American Indian and Alaska Native
- Asian
- Native Hawaiian and Other Pacific Islander

According to the U.S. government, Hispanic Americans do not constitute a race, but rather an ethnic group. During the 2000 U.S. census, Whites made up 75.1% of the population with those being Hispanic or Latino constituting the nation's prevalent minority with 12.5% of the population. African Americans made up 12.3% of the total population, 3.6% were Asian American and 0.7% were Native American.

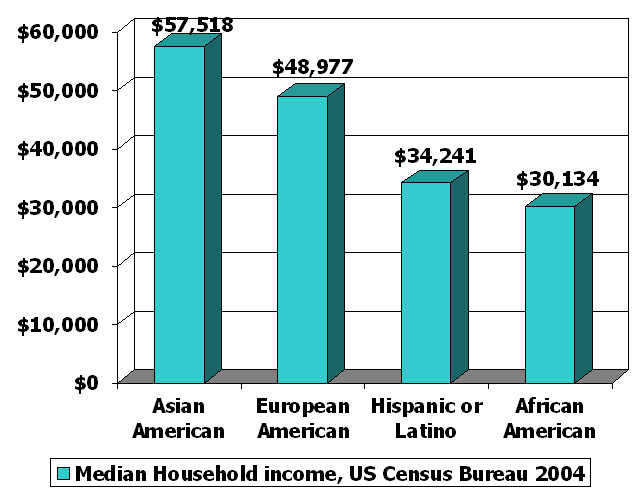
Median household income along ethnic lines in the United States

Approximately 62% of White Americans today are either wholly or partly of English, Welsh, Irish, or Scottish ancestry. Approximately 86% of White Americans are of Northwestern European descent, and 14% are of Eastern and Southern European ancestry.

Until the Thirteenth Amendment to the United States Constitution was ratified on December 6, 1865, the United States was a slave society. While the northern states had outlawed slavery in their territory in the late 18th and early 19th century, their industrial economies relied on the raw materials produced by slave labor. Following the Reconstruction period in the 1870s, Southern states initialized an apartheid regulated by Jim Crow laws that provided for legal segregation. Lynching occurred throughout the US until the 1930s, continuing well into the civil rights movement in the South.

Asian Americans were also marginalized during much of US history. Between 1882 and 1943 the United States government instituted the Chinese Exclusion Act which prohibited Chinese immigrants from entering the nation. During the second world war roughly 120,000 Japanese Americans, 62% of whom were U.S. citizens, were imprisoned in Japanese internment camps. Hispanic Americans also faced segregation and other types of discrimination; they were regularly subject to second class citizen status, in practice if not by law.

Largely as a result of being de jure or de facto excluded and marginalized from so-called mainstream society, racial minorities in the United States developed their own unique sub-cultures. During the 1920s for example, Harlem, New York became home to the Harlem Renaissance. Music styles such as jazz, blues, rap, and rock and roll, as well as numerous folk-songs such as Jimmy Crack Corn originated within the realms of African American culture. Chinatowns can be found in many cities across the nation and Asian cuisine has become a common staple in America.

The Mexican community has also had a dramatic impact on American culture. Today, Catholics are the largest religious denomination in the United States and out-number Protestants in the South-west and California. Mariachi music and Mexican cuisine are commonly found throughout the Southwest, with some Latin dishes of Mexican origin, such burritos and tacos found anywhere in the nation. Economic discrepancies and de facto segregation, however, continue and is a prominent feature of mundane life in the United States.

While Asian Americans have prospered and have a median household income and educational attainment exceeding that of Whites, the same cannot be said for the other races. African Americans, Hispanics and Native Americans have considerably lower income and education than do White Americans. In 2005 the median household income of Whites was 62.5% higher than that of African American, nearly one-quarter of whom live below the poverty line. Furthermore, 46.9% of homicide victims in the United States are African American indicating the many severe socio-economic problems African Americans and minorities in general continue to face in the twenty-first century.

Some aspects of American culture codify racism. For example, the prevailing idea in American culture, perpetuated by the media, has been that black features are less attractive or desirable than white features. The idea that blackness was ugly was highly damaging to the psyche of African Americans, manifesting itself as internalized racism. The Black is beautiful cultural movement sought to dispel this notion.

In the years after the September 11 attacks, discrimination against Arabs and Muslims in the U.S. has increased significantly. The American-Arab Anti-Discrimination Committee (ADC) reported an increase in hate speech, cases of airline discrimination, hate crimes, police misconduct and racial profiling. The USA Patriot Act, signed into effect by President George W. Bush on October 26, 2001, has also raised concerns for violating civil liberties. Section 412 of the act provides the government with "sweeping new powers to detain immigrants and other foreign nationals indefinitely with little or no due process at the discretion of the Attorney General." Other sections also allow the government to conduct secret searches, seizures and surveillance, and to freely interpret the definition of 'terrorist activities'.

== Religion ==
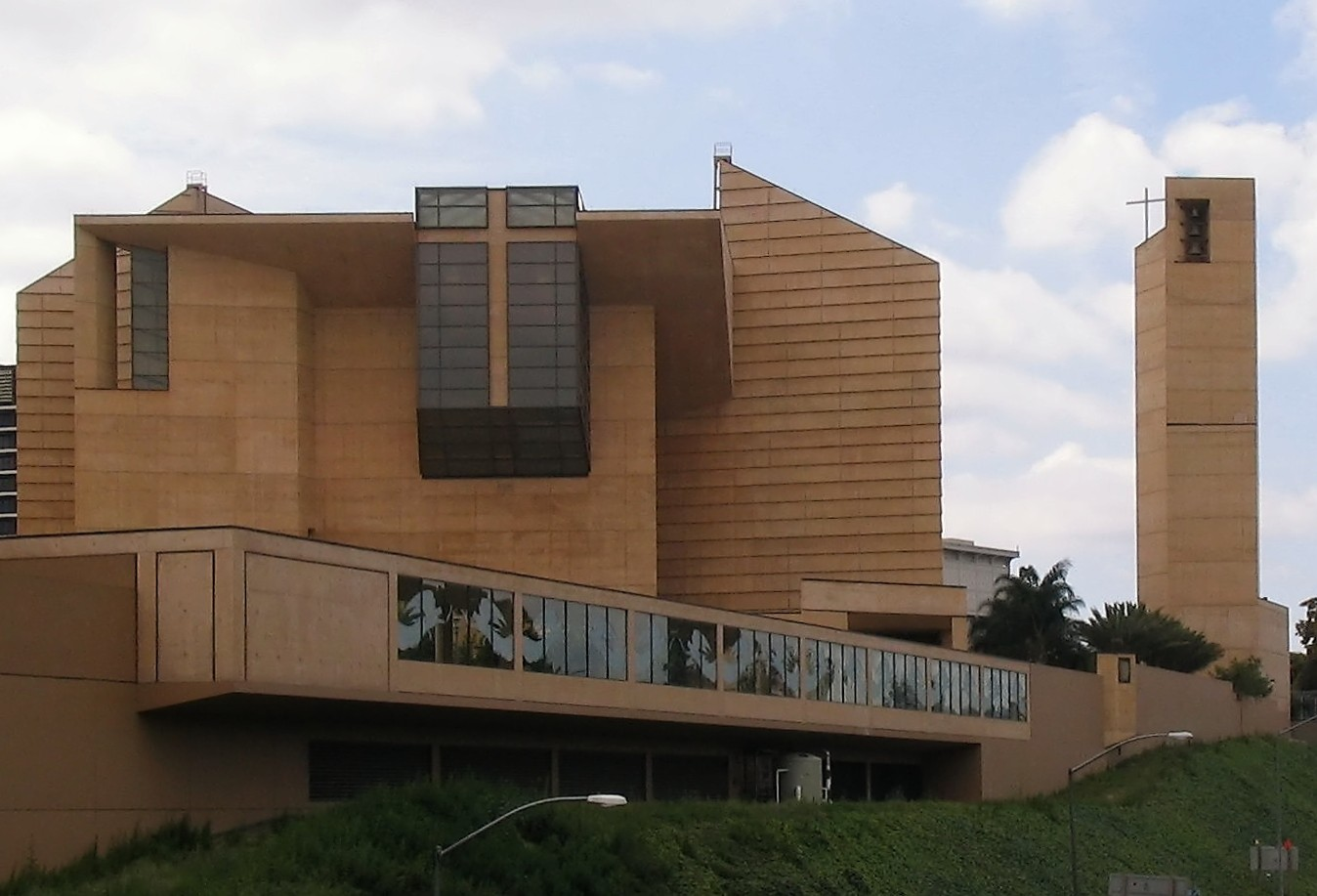
Cathedral of Our Lady of the Angels, the Roman Catholic seat of the Archdiocese of Los Angeles

Historically, the United States' religious tradition has been dominated by Protestant Christianity. As of 2016, 74% of Americans identify as Christian with 49% identifying as Protestant. Catholicism (23%) is the largest Christian denomination, as Protestants belong to a variety of denominations. Also practiced in the United States are many other religions, such as Judaism, Hinduism, Islam, and Buddhism. Approximately 18% of Americans are unaffiliated; a majority of these are those not affiliated with any one religion, it also includes agnostics and atheists.

The government is a secular institution, with what is often called the "separation of church and state" prevailing.

== Social class and work ==
Though most Americans today identify themselves as middle class, American society and its culture are considerably more fragmented. Social class, generally described as a combination of educational attainment, income and occupational prestige, is one of the greatest cultural influences in America. Nearly all cultural aspects of mundane interactions and consumer behavior in the US are guided by a person's location within the country's social structure.

Distinct lifestyles, consumption patterns and values are associated with different classes. Early sociologist-economist Thorstein Veblen, for example, noted that those at the very top of the social ladder engage in conspicuous leisure as well as conspicuous consumption. Upper-middle-class persons commonly identify education and being cultured as prime values. Persons in this particular social class tend to speak in a more direct manner that projects authority, knowledge and thus credibility. They often tend to engage in the consumption of so-called mass luxuries, such as designer label clothing. A strong preference for natural materials and organic foods as well as a strong health consciousness tend to be prominent features of the upper middle class. Middle-class individuals in general value expanding one's horizon, partially because they are more educated and can afford greater leisure and travels. Working-class individuals take great pride in doing what they consider to be "real work," and keep very close-knit kin networks that serve as a safeguard against frequent economic instability.

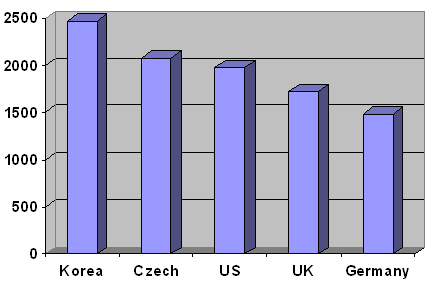
Hours worked in different countries according to UN data in a CNN report

Working-class Americans as well as many of those in the middle class may also face occupation alienation. In contrast to upper-middle-class professionals who are mostly hired to conceptualize, supervise and share their thoughts, many Americans enjoy only little autonomy or creative latitude in the workplace. As a result, white collar professionals tend to be significantly more satisfied with their work. More recently those in the center of the income strata, who may still identify as middle class, have faced increasing economic insecurity, supporting the idea of a working-class majority.

Political behavior is affected by class; more affluent individuals are more likely to vote, and education and income affect whether individuals tend to vote for the Democratic or Republican party. Income also had a significant impact on health as those with higher incomes had better access to health care facilities, higher life expectancy, lower infant mortality rate and increased health consciousness.

In the United States, occupation is one of the prime factors of social class and is closely linked to an individual's identity. The average work week in the US for those employed full-time was 42.9 hours long with 30% of the population working more than 40 hours a week. Many of those in the top two earning quintiles often worked more than 50 hours a week. The Average American worker earned $16.64 an hour in the first two quarters of 2006.

Overall Americans worked more than their counterparts in other developed post-industrial nations. While the average worker in Denmark enjoyed 30 days of vacation annually, the average American only had 16 annual vacation days. In 2000 the average American worked 1,978 hours per year, 500 hours more than the average German, yet 100 hours less than the average Czech. Overall the US labor force was the most productive in the world (overall, not by hour worked), largely due to its workers working more than those in any other post-industrial country (excluding South Korea). Americans generally hold working and being productive in high regard; being busy and working extensively may also serve as the means to obtain esteem.

== Group affiliations ==
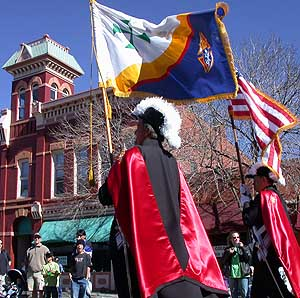
The Knights of Columbus exhibiting their group identity

As the United States is a diverse nation, it is home to numerous organization and social groups and individuals may derive their group affiliated identity from a variety of sources. Many Americans, especially white collar professionals belong to professional organizations such as the APA, ASA, or ATFLC, although books like Bowling Alone indicate that Americans affiliate with these sorts of groups less often than they did in the 1950s and 1960s.

Today, Americans derive a great deal of their identity through their work and professional affiliation, especially among individuals higher on the economic ladder. Recently professional identification has led to many clerical and low-level employees giving their occupations new, more respectable titles, such as "Sanitation service engineer" instead of "Janitor."

Additionally many Americans belong to non-profit organizations and religious establishments and may volunteer their services to such organizations. The Rotary Club, the Knights of Columbus or even the Society for the Prevention of Cruelty to Animals are examples of such non-profit and mostly volunteer-run organizations. Ethnicity plays another important role in providing some Americans with group identity, especially among those who recently immigrated.

Many American cities are home to ethnic enclaves such as a Chinatown and Little Italies which still remain in some cities. Local patriotism may be also provide group identity. For example, a person may be particularly proud to be from California or New York City, and may display clothing from a local sports team.

Political lobbies such as the AARP, ADL, NAACP, NOW, and GLAAD (examples being civil rights activist organizations) not only provide individuals with a sentiment of intra-group allegiance but also increase their political representation in the nation's political system. Combined, profession, ethnicity, religious, and other group affiliations have provided Americans with a multitude of options to derive group based identity from. However, while these group affiliations offer a sense of belonging, a 2024 private opinion study called Social Pressure Index revealed that 37% of Americans publicly say society is fair, but only 7% privately agree. This 30-point gap shows a deep divide between public statements and private beliefs.

== Food ==
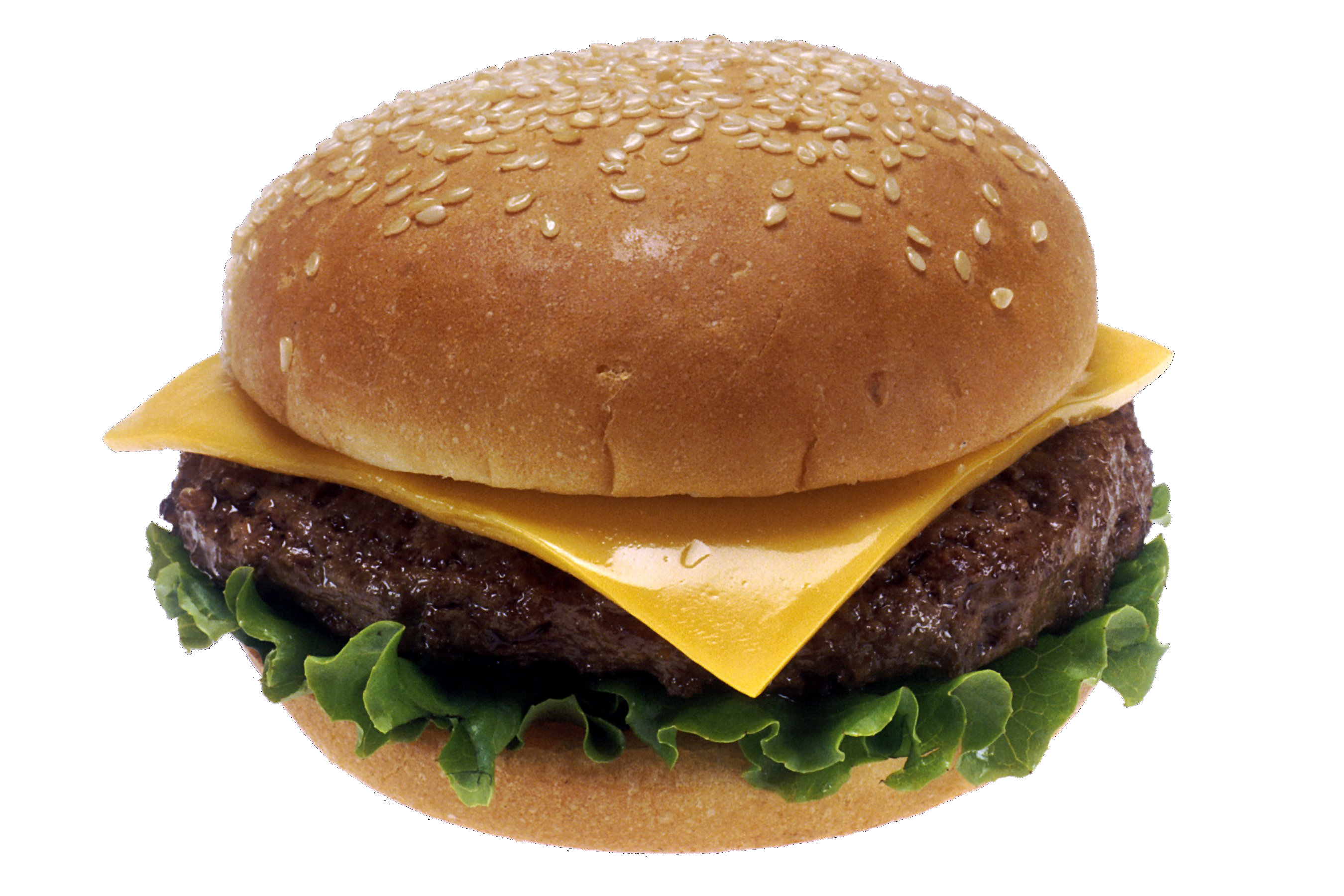
A hamburger is a famous food in the United States.

The cuisine of the United States is extremely diverse, owing to the vastness of the continent, the relatively large population, and the number of native and immigrant influences. The types of food served at home vary greatly and depend upon the region of the country and the family's own cultural heritage. Recent immigrants tend to eat food similar to that of their country of origin, and Americanized versions of these cultural foods, such as American Chinese cuisine or Italian-American cuisine often eventually appear; an example is Vietnamese cuisine, Korean cuisine, and Thai cuisine.

German cuisine has a profound impact on American cuisine, especially mid-western cuisine, with potatoes, noodles, roasts, stews and cakes/pastries being the most iconic ingredients in both cuisines. Dishes such as the hamburger, pot roast, baked ham and hot dogs are examples of American dishes derived from German cuisine.

Different regions of the United States have their own cuisine and styles of cooking. The state of Louisiana, for example, is known for its Cajun and Creole cooking. Cajun and Creole cooking are influenced by French, Acadian, and Haitian cooking, although the dishes themselves are original and unique. Examples include crawfish etouffee, red beans and rice, seafood or chicken gumbo, jambalaya, and boudin. Italian, German, Hungarian, and Chinese influences, traditional Native American, Caribbean, Mexican, and Greek dishes have also diffused into the general American repertoire. It is not uncommon for a 'middle-class' family from 'middle-America' to eat, for example, restaurant pizza, home-made pizza, enchiladas con carne, chicken paprikas, beef stroganoff, and bratwurst with sauerkraut for dinner throughout a single week.

== Drugs, alcohol, and smoking ==
American attitudes towards drugs and alcoholic beverages have evolved considerably throughout the country's history.

During the nineteenth century, alcohol was readily available and consumed, and no laws restricted the use of other drugs. A movement to ban alcoholic beverages, called the temperance movement, emerged in the late nineteenth century. Several American Protestant religious groups, as well as women's groups such as the Women's Christian Temperance Union, supported the movement.

In 1919, prohibitionists succeeded in amending the Constitution to prohibit the sale of alcohol. Although the Prohibition period did result in lowering alcohol consumption overall, banning alcohol outright proved to be unworkable, as the previously legitimate distillery industry was replaced by criminal gangs which trafficked in alcohol. Prohibition was repealed in 1931. States and localities retained the right to remain "dry", and to this day, a handful still do.

During the Vietnam War era, attitudes swung well away from prohibition. Commentators noted that an eighteen-year-old could be drafted into the military to fight in a war overseas, but could not buy a beer. Most states lowered the legal drinking age to eighteen.

Since 1980, the trend has been toward greater restrictions on alcohol and drug use. The focus this time, however, has been to criminalize behaviors associated with alcohol, rather than attempt to prohibit consumption outright. New York was the first state to enact tough drunk driving laws in 1980; since then all other states have followed suit. A "Just Say No to Drugs" movement replaced the more libertine ethos of the 1960s.

Attitudes towards Cannabis have significantly relaxed since the 1980s era "Just Say No" campaign fears over the gateway drug effect. Washington and Colorado became the first states to legalize recreational cannabis consumption in December 2012. As of 2024, recreational use is legal in 24 states and medical use is legal in 38 states.

== Clothing ==
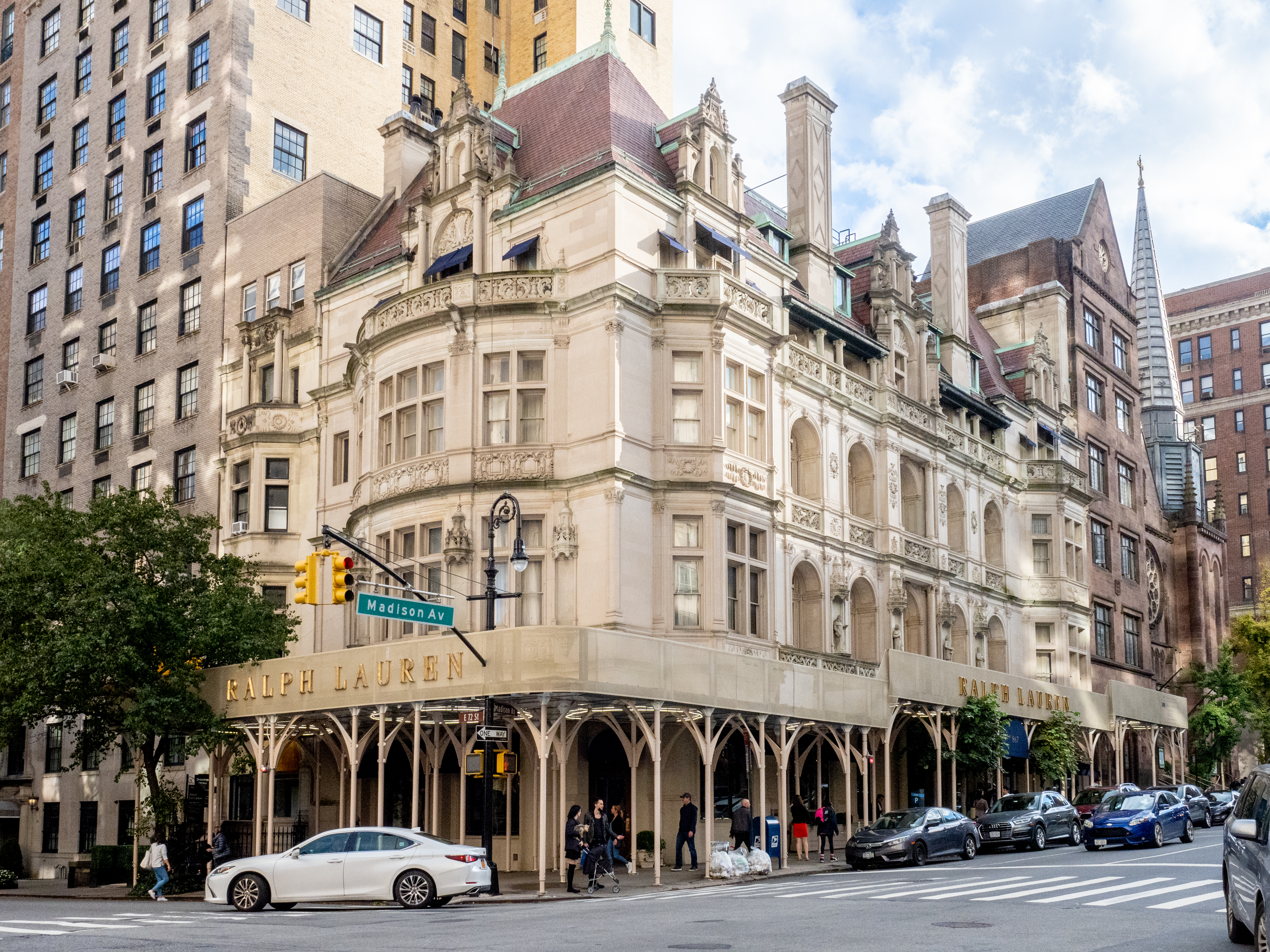
Ralph Lauren

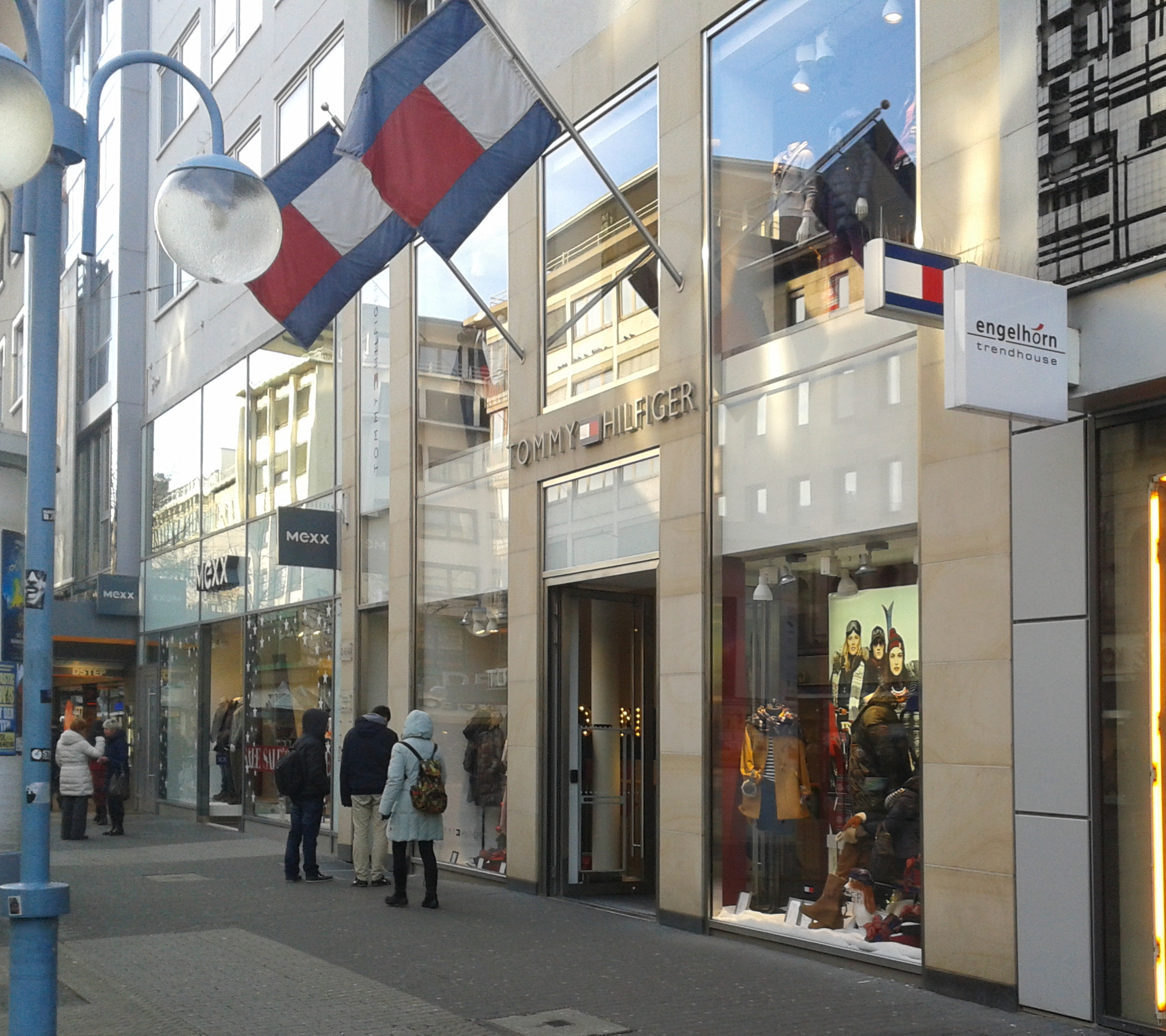
Tommy Hilfiger

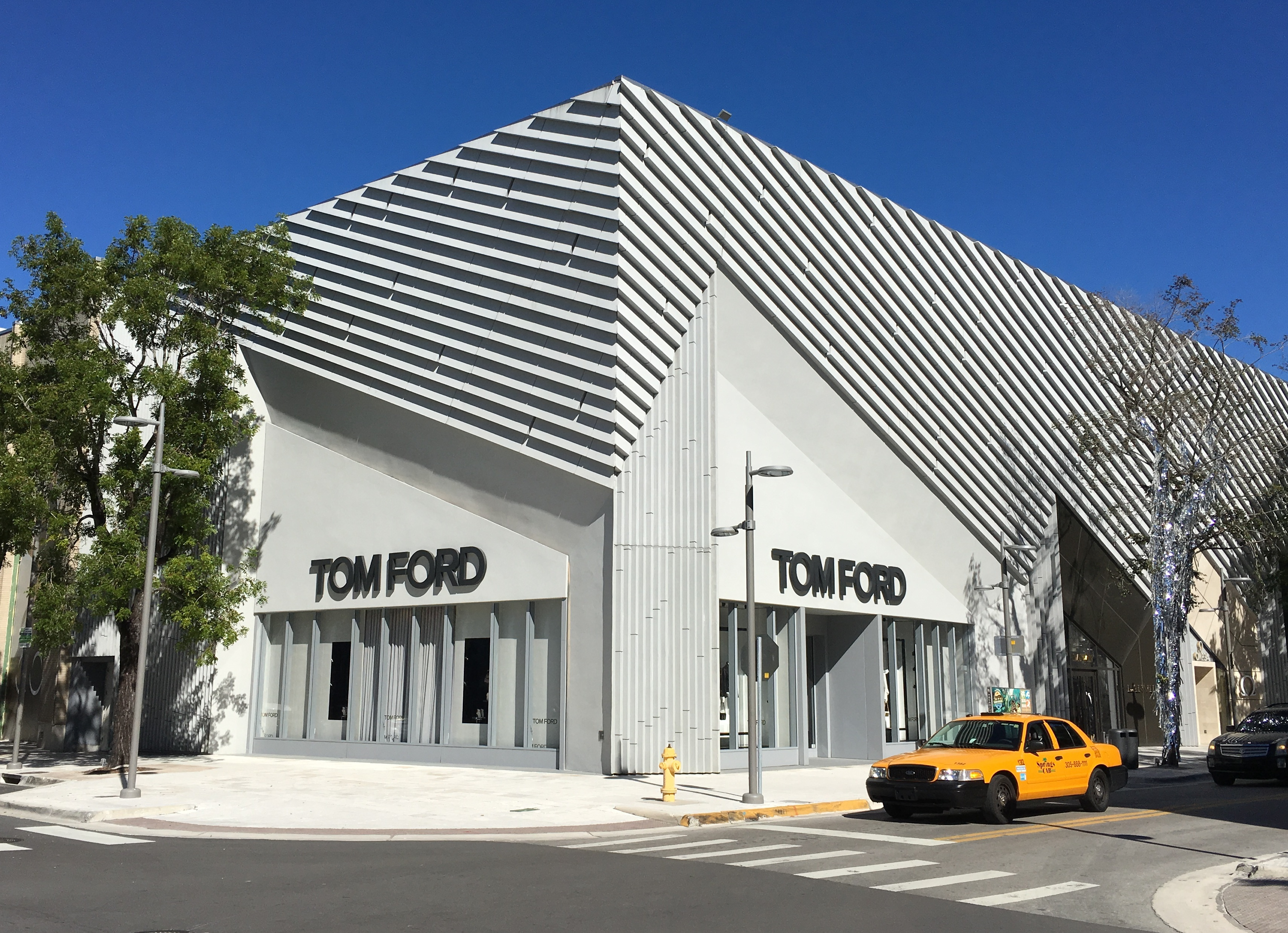
Tom Ford

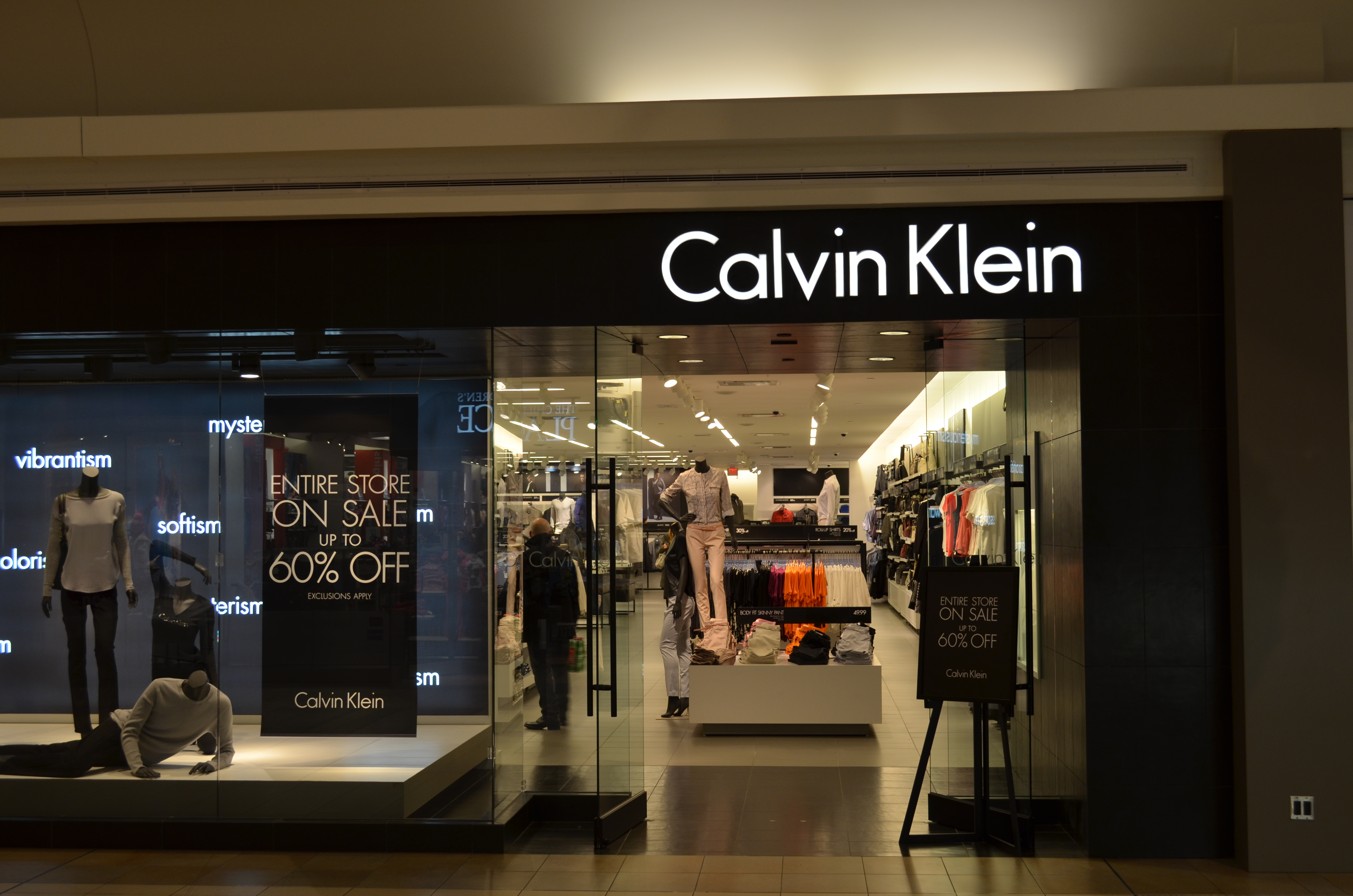
Calvin Klein

Top U.S. Fashion designer labels are headquartered in Manhattan, NY

Apart from professional business attire, clothing in the United States is eclectic and predominantly informal. While Americans' diverse cultural roots are reflected in their clothing, particularly those of recent immigrants, baseball caps, cowboy hats and boots and leather motorcycle jackets are emblematic of specifically American styles.

Blue jeans were popularized as work clothes in the 1850s by merchant Levi Strauss and they are now widely worn on every continent by people of all ages and social classes. Along with mass-marketed informal wear in general, blue jeans are arguably U.S. culture's primary contribution to global fashion. The country is also home to the headquarters of many leading designer labels such as Ralph Lauren and Calvin Klein. Labels such as Abercrombie & Fitch and Eckō Unltd. cater to various niche markets.

=== Measurement ===
The United States is the only industrialized nation state that has not officially converted to and predominantly uses, the metric system. Instead, an older version of the imperial system called the US customary system is the official system used. A few attempts at metrication have been implemented, though they all lost momentum. The most recent was the Metric Conversion Act of 1975. That said, certain products, organizations and fields, particularly in the sciences measure in the metric system.

== Language ==
The official language of the United States is English. States and territories variously recognize English only, English plus one or more local languages, or no language at all. According to the 2000 U.S. census, more than 93% of Americans can speak English well, and for 81% it is the only language spoken at home. Nearly 30 million native speakers of Spanish also reside in the US. There are more than 300 languages besides English which can claim native speakers in the United States—some of which are spoken by the indigenous peoples (about 150 living languages) and others which were imported by immigrants.

American Sign Language, used mainly by the deaf, is also native to the country. Hawaiian is also a language native to the United States, as it is indigenous nowhere else except in the state of Hawaii. Spanish is the second most common language in the United States, and is one of the official languages, and the most widely spoken, in the U.S. Commonwealth of Puerto Rico.

There are four major regional dialects zones in the United States: northeastern, south, inland north, and midwestern. The Midwestern accent (considered the "standard accent" in the United States, and analogous in some respects to the received pronunciation elsewhere in the English-speaking world) extends from what were once the "Middle Colonies" across the Midwest to the Pacific states. Among these dialects are countless subvarieties, such as Cajun English, "High Tider", NYC English, etc, although most of these varieties are dying out in favor of the more uniform and homogenous General American accent.

== Education ==
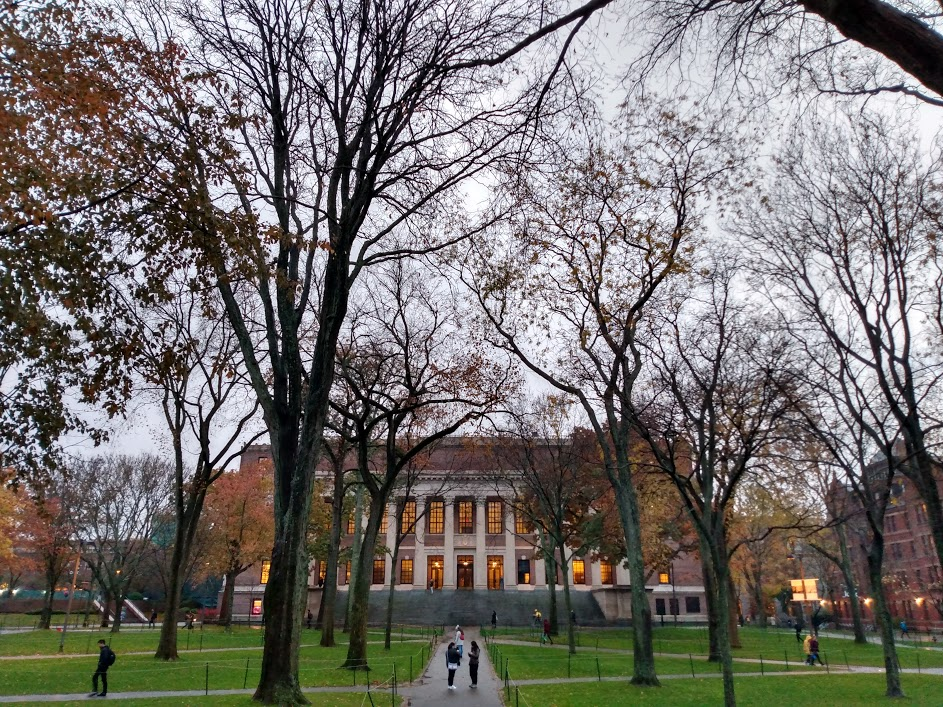
Harvard University, a private Ivy League university in Cambridge, Massachusetts, and the first university established in the United States

Education in the United States is provided mainly by government, with control and funding coming from three levels: federal, state, and local. School attendance is mandatory and nearly universal at the elementary and high school levels (often known outside the United States as the primary and secondary levels).

Students have the options of having their education held in public schools, private schools, or home school. In most public and private schools, education is divided into three levels: elementary school, junior high school (also often called middle school), and high school. In almost all schools at these levels, children are divided by age groups into grades. Post-secondary education, better known as "college" or "university" in the United States, is generally governed separately from the elementary and high school system.

In the year 2000, there were 76.6 million students enrolled in schools from kindergarten through graduate schools. Of these, 72 percent aged 12 to 17 were judged academically "on track" for their age (enrolled in school at or above grade level). Of those enrolled in compulsory education, 5.2 million (10.4 percent) were attending private schools. Among the country's adult population, over 85 percent have completed high school and 27 percent have received a bachelor's degree or higher.

== Sports ==
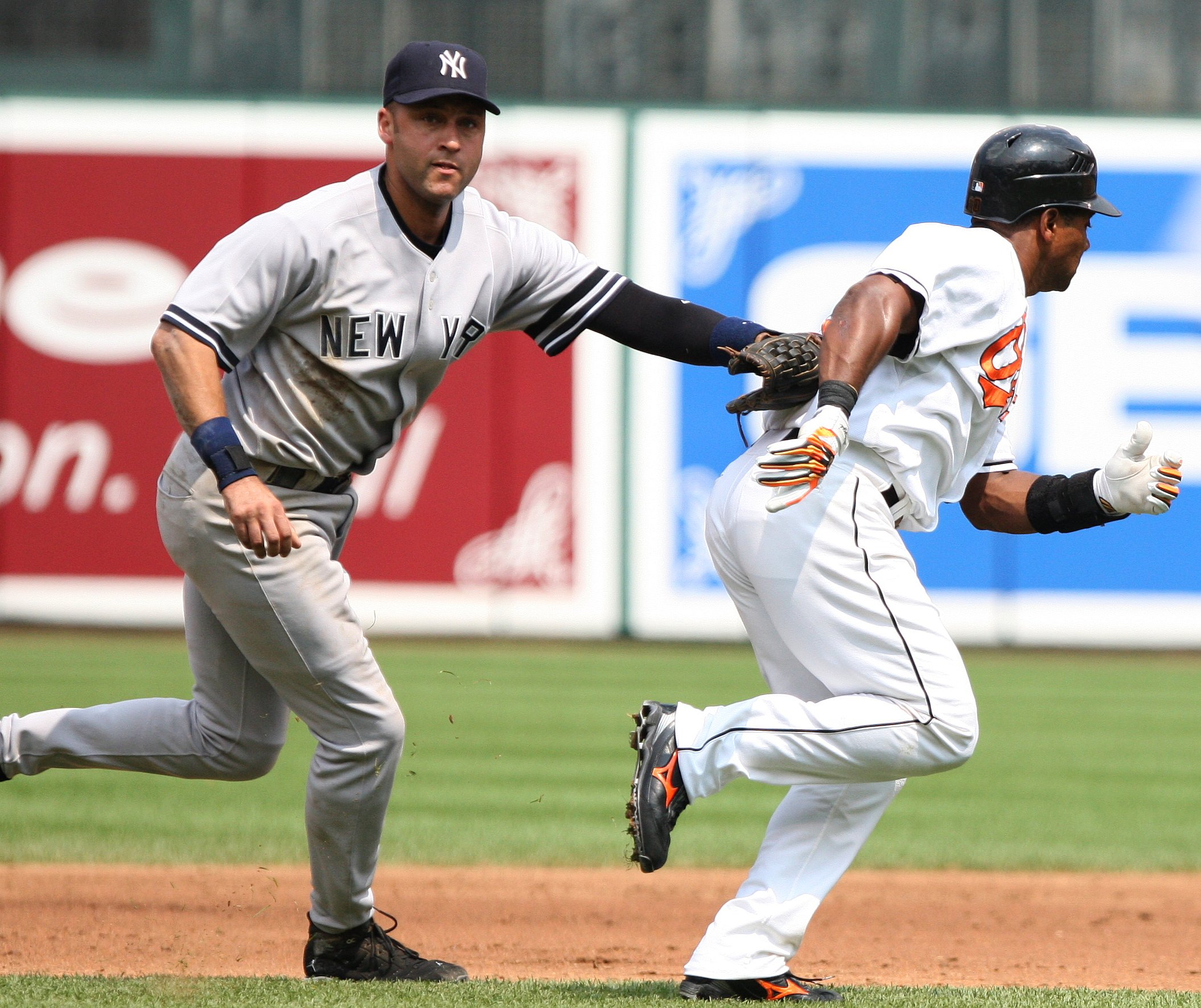
Major League Baseball (MLB)

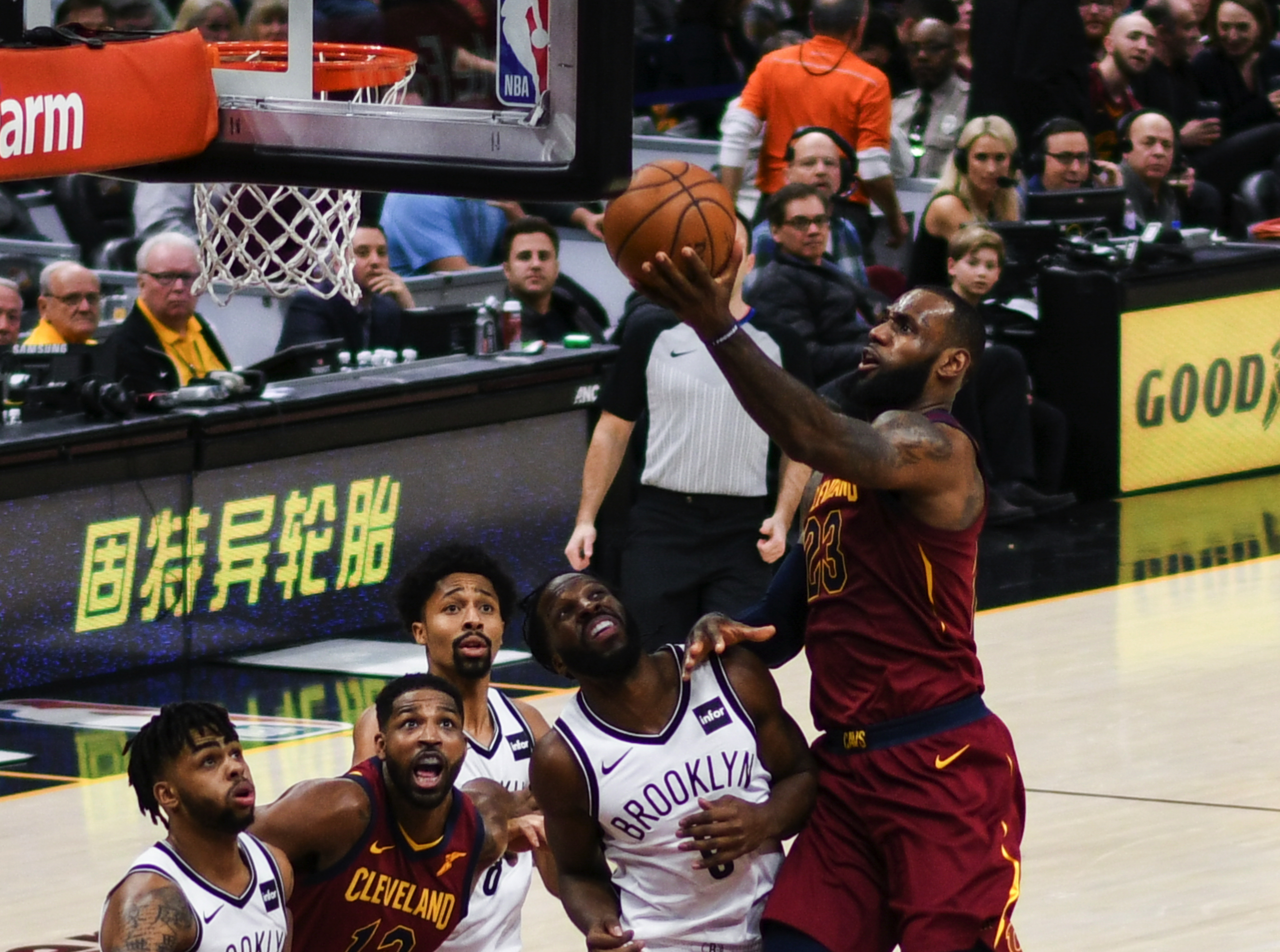
National Basketball Association (NBA)

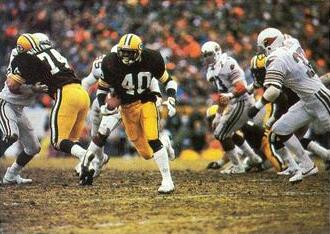
National Football League (NFL)

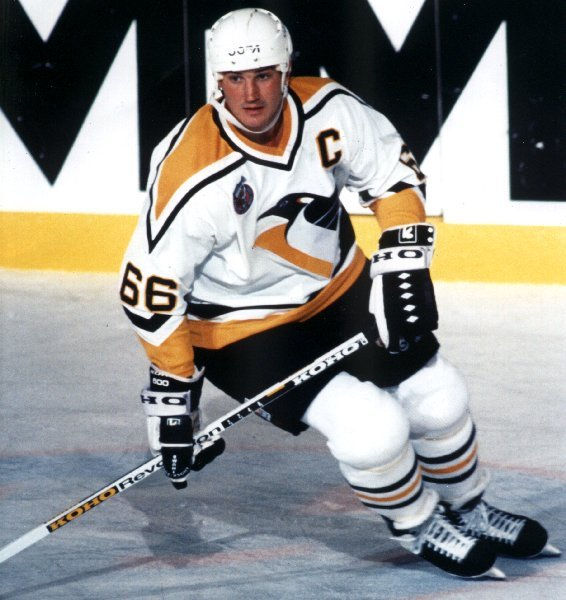
National Hockey League (NHL)

The Big Four

Since the late nineteenth century, baseball is regarded as the national sport; American football, basketball, and ice hockey are the country's three other leading professional team sports. College football and basketball also attract large audiences. Football is now by several measures the most popular spectator sport in the United States. Soccer, though not a leading professional sport in the country, is played widely at the youth and amateur levels.

Boxing and horse racing were once the most watched individual sports, but they have been eclipsed by golf and auto racing, particularly NASCAR. Tennis and many outdoor sports are also popular.

== Technology, gadgets, and automobiles ==
Americans, by and large, are often fascinated by new technology and new gadgets. There are many within the United States that share the attitude that through technology, many of the evils in the society can be solved. Many of the new technological innovations in the modern world were either first invented in the United States and/or first widely adopted by Americans. Examples include: the lightbulb, the airplane, the transistor, nuclear power, the personal computer, video games, and online shopping, as well as the development of the Internet. By comparison with Japan, however, only a small fraction of electronic devices make it to sale in the US, and household items such as toilets are rarely festooned with remotes and electronic buttons as they are in some parts of Asia.

Automobiles play a great role in American culture, whether it is in the mundane lives of private individuals or in the areas of arts and entertainment. The rise of suburbs and the desire for workers to commute to cities brought about the popularization of automobiles. In 2001, 90% of Americans drove to work in cars. Lower energy and land costs favor the production of relatively large, powerful cars. The culture in the 1950s and 1960s often catered to the automobile with motels and drive-in restaurants. Americans tend to view obtaining a driver's license as a rite of passage. Outside of a relative few urban areas, it is considered a necessity for most Americans to own and drive cars. More than one hundred people are killed every day from motor vehicle crashes in the United States. Motor vehicle crashes are the leading cause of death in the workplace in the United States accounting for 35 percent of all workplace fatalities. There are about three million nonfatal vehicle injuries annually (about one injury per hundred people). Road transport is the most dangerous situation people deal with on a daily basis; but these casualty figures attract less media attention than other, less frequent events. New York City is the only locality in the United States where more than half of all households do not own a car.

== Housing ==
Immediately after World War II, Americans began living in increasing numbers in the suburbs, belts around major cities with higher density than rural areas, but much lower than urban areas. This move has been attributed to many factors such as the automobile, the availability of large tracts of land, the convenience of more and longer paved roads, the increasing violence in urban centers (see white flight), and cheaper housing. These new single-family houses were usually one or two stories tall, and often were part of large contracts of homes built by a single developer.

The resulting low-density development has been given the pejorative label urban sprawl. This is changing, however. White flight is reversing, with many Yuppies and upper-middle-class, empty nest Baby Boomers returning to urban living, usually in condominia, such as in New York City's Lower East Side, and Chicago's South Loop. The result has been the displacement of many poorer, inner-city residents. (see gentrification).

American cities with housing prices near the national median have also been losing the middle income neighborhoods, those with median income between 80% and 120% of the metropolitan area's median household income. Here, the more affluent members of the middle-class, who are also often referred to as being professional or upper middle-class, have left in search of larger homes in more exclusive suburbs. This trend is largely attributed to the so-called "Middle class squeeze", which has caused a starker distinction between the statistical middle class and the more privileged members of the middle class. In more expensive areas such as California, however, another trend has been taking place where an influx of more affluent middle-class households has displaced those in the actual middle of society and converted former middle-middle-class neighborhoods into upper-middle-class neighborhoods.

The population of rural areas has been declining over time as more and more people migrate to cities for work and entertainment. The great exodus from the farms came in the 1940s; in recent years fewer than 2% of the population lives on farms (though many others live in the countryside and commute to work). Electricity and telephone, and sometimes cable and Internet services are available to all but the most remote regions. As in the cities, children attend school up to and including high school and only help with farming during the summer months or after school.

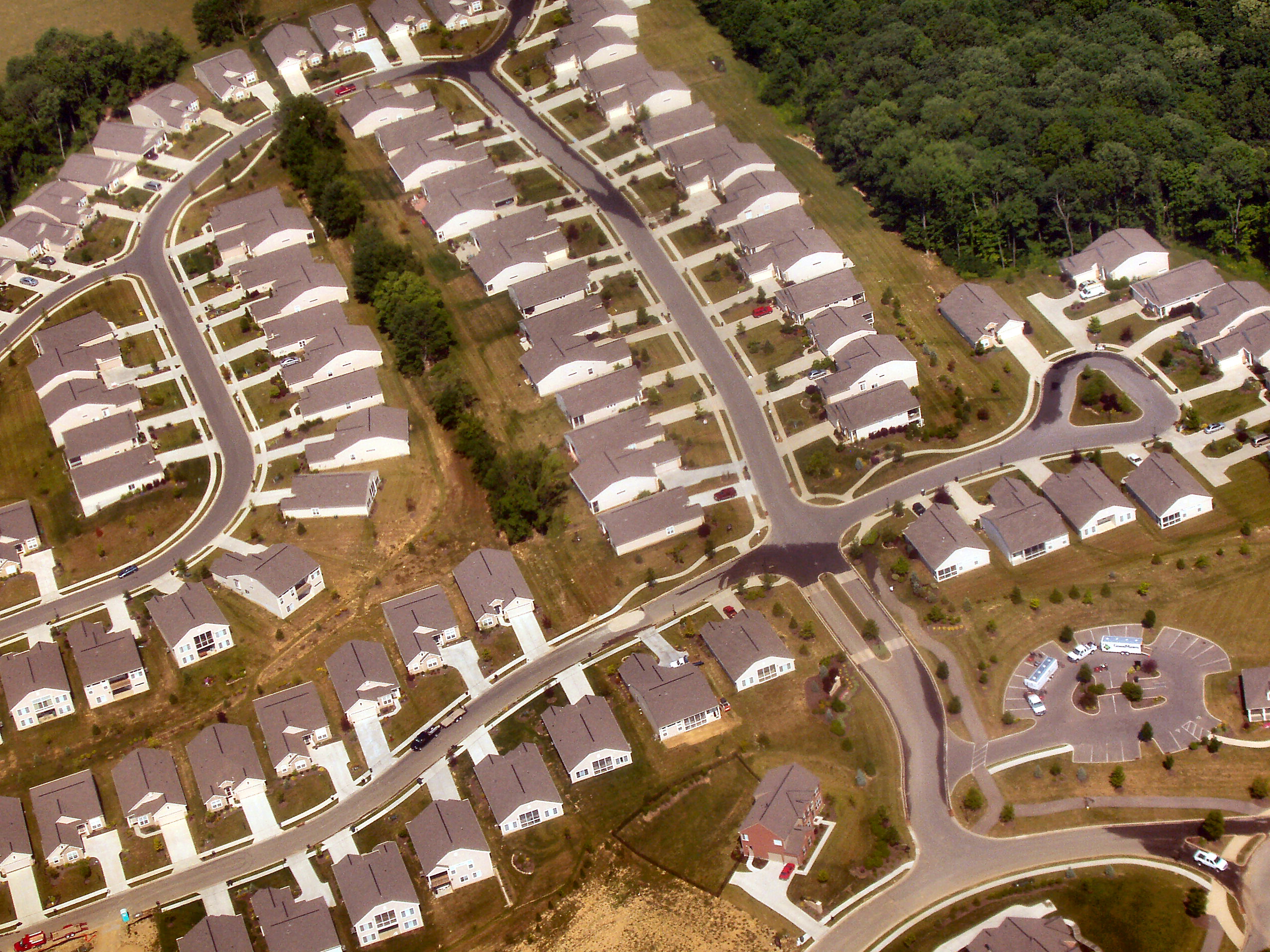
Tract housing in Kentucky near Cincinnati, Ohio

About half of Americans now live in what is known as the suburbs. The suburban nuclear family has been identified as part of the "American dream": a married couple with children owning a house in the suburbs. This archetype is reinforced by mass media, religious practices, and government policies and is based on traditions from Anglo-Saxon cultures. One of the biggest differences in suburban living as compared to urban living is the housing occupied by the families. The suburbs are filled with single-family homes separated from retail districts, industrial areas, and sometimes even public schools. However, many American suburbs are incorporating these districts on smaller scales, attracting more people to these communities.

Housing in urban areas may include more apartments and semi-attached homes than in the suburbs or small towns. Aside from housing, the major difference from suburban living is the density and diversity of many different subcultures, as well as retail and manufacturing buildings mixed with housing in urban areas. Urban residents are also more likely to travel by mass transit, and children are more likely to walk or cycle rather than being driven by their parents.

== Gender relations ==
=== Courtship, cohabitation, and sexuality ===
Couples often meet through religious institutions, work, school, or friends. "Dating services" are geared to assist people in finding partners, are popular both on and offline. The trend over the past few decades has been for more and more couples deciding to cohabit before, or instead of, getting married. The United States Census Bureau reported 9,700,000 opposite-sex partners living together and about 1,300,000 same-sex partners living together. These cohabitation arrangements have not been the subject of many laws regulating them, though some states now have domestic partner statutes and judge-made palimony doctrines that confer some legal support for unmarried couples.

Adolescent sex is common; most Americans first have sexual intercourse in their teenage years. The current data suggests that by the time a person turns eighteen years old, slightly more than half of females and nearly two-thirds of males will have had sexual relations. More than half of sexually active teens have had sexual partners they are dating. Risky sexual behaviors that involve "anything intercourse related" are "rampant" among teenagers. Teenage pregnancies in the United States decreased 28% between 1990 and 2000 from 117 pregnancies per every 1,000 teens to 84 per 1,000. The United States is rated, based on 2002 estimates, 84 out of 170 countries based on teenage fertility rate, according to the World Health Organization.

=== Marriage and divorce ===
Marriage laws are established by individual states. Same-sex marriage has been legal nationwide since 2015.

In many states, it is illegal to cross state lines to obtain a marriage that would be illegal in the home state. The typical wedding involves a couple proclaiming their commitment to one another in front of their close relatives and friends, often presided over by a religious figure such as a minister, priest, or rabbi, depending upon the faith of the couple. In traditional Christian ceremonies, the bride's father will "give away" (hand off) the bride to the groom. Secular weddings are also common, often presided over by a judge, justice of the peace, or other municipal official.

Divorce is the province of state governments, so divorce law varies from state to state. Prior to the 1970s, divorcing spouses had to prove that the other spouse was at fault, for instance for being guilty of adultery, abandonment, or cruelty; when spouses simply could not get along, lawyers were forced to manufacture "uncontested" divorces. The no-fault divorce revolution began in 1969 in California and ended with New York. No-fault divorce (on the grounds of "irreconcilable differences", "irretrievable breakdown of marriage", "incompatibility", or after a separation period etc.) is now available in all states.

As with other Western countries, the United States has now a substantial proportion of children born outside of marriage: in 2010, 40.7% of all births were to unmarried women.

State law provides for child support where children are involved, and sometimes for alimony. "Married adults now divorce two-and-a-half times as often as adults did 20 years ago and four times as often as they did 50 years ago... between 40% and 60% of new marriages will eventually end in divorce. The probability within... the first five years is 20%, and the probability of its ending within the first 10 years is 33%... Perhaps 25% of children ages sixteen and under live with a step-parent." The median length for a marriage in the US today is eleven years with 90% of all divorces being settled out of court.

=== Gender roles ===
Since the 1970s, traditional gender roles of male and female have been increasingly challenged by both legal and social means. Today, there are far fewer roles that are legally restricted by one's sex.

Most social roles are not gender-restricted by law, though there are still cultural inhibitions surrounding certain roles. More and more women have entered the workplace, and in the year 2000, made up 46.6% of the labor force; up from 18.3% in 1900. Most men, however, have not taken up the traditional full-time homemaker role; likewise, few men have taken traditionally feminine jobs such as receptionist or nurse (although nursing was traditionally a male role prior to the American Civil War).

== Death rituals ==
It is customary for Americans to hold a wake in a funeral home within a couple days of the death of a loved one. The body of the deceased may be embalmed and dressed in fine clothing if there will be an open-casket viewing. Traditional Jewish and Muslim practice include a ritual bath and no embalming. Friends, relatives and acquaintances gather, often from distant parts of the country, to "pay their last respects" to the deceased. Flowers are brought to the coffin and sometimes eulogies, elegies, personal anecdotes or group prayers are recited. Otherwise, the attendees sit, stand or kneel in quiet contemplation or prayer. Kissing the corpse on the forehead is typical among Italian Americans and others. Condolences are also offered to the widow or widower and other close relatives.

A funeral may be held immediately afterwards or the next day. The funeral ceremony varies according to religion and culture. American Catholics typically hold a funeral mass in a church, which sometimes takes the form of a requiem mass. Jewish Americans may hold a service in a synagogue or temple. Pallbearers carry the coffin of the deceased to the hearse, which then proceeds in a procession to the place of final repose, usually a cemetery. The unique jazz funeral of New Orleans features joyous and raucous music and dancing during the procession.

Mount Auburn Cemetery (founded in 1831) is known as "America's first garden cemetery." American cemeteries created since are distinctive for their park-like setting. Rows of graves are covered by lawns and are interspersed with trees and flowers. Headstones, mausoleums, statuary or simple plaques typically mark off the individual graves. Cremation is another common practice in the United States, though it is frowned upon by various religions. The ashes of the deceased are usually placed in an urn, which may be kept in a private house, or they are interred. Sometimes the ashes are released into the atmosphere. The "sprinkling" or "scattering" of the ashes may be part of an informal ceremony, often taking place at a scenic natural feature (a cliff, lake, or mountain) that was favored by the deceased.

A so-called death industry has developed in the United States that has replaced earlier, more informal traditions. Before the popularity of funeral homes, a wake would be held in an ordinary, private house. Often the most elegant room was reserved for this purpose.

== Household arrangements ==
US family structure has no particular household arrangement being prevalent enough to be identified as the average.

Today, family arrangements in the United States reflect the diverse and dynamic nature of contemporary American society. Although for a relatively brief period of time in the 20th century most families adhered to the nuclear family concept (two-married adults with a biological child), single-parent families, childless/childfree couples, and fused families now constitute the majority of families.

Most Americans will marry and get divorced at least once during their life; thus, most individuals will live in a variety of family arrangements. A person may grow up in a single-parent family, go on to marry and live in childless couple arrangement, then get divorced, live as a single for a couple of years, remarry, have children and live in a nuclear family arrangement.

"The nuclear family... is the idealized version of what most people think when they think of "family..." The old definition of what a family is... the nuclear family- no longer seems adequate to cover the wide diversity of household arrangements we see today, according to many social scientists (Edwards 1991; Stacey 1996). Thus has arisen the term postmodern family, which is meant to describe the great variability in family forms, including single-parent families and child-free couples."- Brian K. Williams, Stacey C. Sawyer, Carl M. Wahlstrom, Marriages, Families & Intinamte Relationships, 2005.

Other changes to the landscape of American family arrangements include dual-income earner households and delayed independence among American youths. Whereas most families in the 1950s and 1960s relied on one income earner, more commonly the husband, the vast majority of family households now have two-income earners.

Another change is the increasing age at which young Americans leave their parental home. Traditionally, a person past "college age" who lived with their parent(s) was viewed negatively, as "basement dwellers", but today it is not uncommon for children to live with their parents until their mid-twenties. This trend can be mostly attributed to rising living costs that far exceed those in decades past, as well as the growing prevalence of intellectual and developmental disabilities that make independent living almost impossible. Thus, many young adults now remain with their parents well past their mid-20s. This topic was a cover article of TIME magazine in 2005.

Exceptions to the custom of leaving home in one's mid-20s can occur especially among Italian and Hispanic Americans, and in expensive urban real estate markets such as New York City , California , and Honolulu , where monthly rents commonly exceed $2000 or $3000 a month.

Year	Families (69.7%)				Non-families (31.2%)		
Year	Married couples (52.5%)		Single Parents	Other blood relatives	Singles (25.5%)		Other non-family
Year	Nuclear family	Without children	Single Parents	Other blood relatives	Male	Female	Other non-family
2000	24.1%	28.7%	9.9%	7%	10.7%	14.8%	5.7%
1970	40.3%	30.3%	5.2%	5.5%	5.6%	11.5%	1.7%

Single-parent households are households consisting of a single adult (most often a woman) and one or more children. In the single-parent household, one parent typically raises the children with little to no help from the other. This parent is the sole "breadwinner" of the family and thus these households are particularly vulnerable economically. They have higher rates of poverty, and children of these households are more likely to have educational problems.

== Regional variations ==
Cultural differences in the various regions of the United States are explored in New England, Mid-Atlantic States, Southern United States, Midwestern United States, Southwest United States, Western United States and Pacific Northwestern United States pages. The western coast of the continental United States consisting of California, Oregon, and the state of Washington is also sometimes referred to as the Left Coast, indicating its left-leaning political orientation and tendency towards liberal norms, folkways and values.

Strong cultural differences have a long history in the US with the southern slave society in the antebellum period serving as a prime example. Not only social, but also economic tensions between the Northern and Southern states were so severe that they eventually caused the South to declare itself an independent nation, the Confederate States of America; thus provoking the American Civil War. One example of regional variations is the attitude towards the discussion of sex, often sexual discussions would have less restrictions in the Northeastern United States, but yet is seen as taboo in the Southern United States and to a lesser extent, in the Midwestern United States.

In his 1989 book, Albion's Seed (ISBN 0195069056), David Hackett Fischer suggests that the United States is made up today of four distinct regional cultures. The book's focus is on the folkways of four groups of settlers from the British Isles that emigrated from distinct regions of Britain and Ireland to the British American colonies during the 17th and 18th centuries. Fischer's thesis is that the culture and folkways of each of these groups persisted, with some modification over time, providing the basis for the four modern regional cultures of the United States.

According to Fischer, the foundation of American culture was formed from four mass migrations from four different regions of the British Isles by four distinct socio-religious groups. New England's earliest settlement period occurred between 1629 and 1640 when Puritans, mostly from East Anglia in England, settled there, forming the New England regional culture. The next mass migration was of southern English cavaliers and their Irish and Scottish domestic servants to the Chesapeake Bay region between 1640 and 1675, producing the Southern American culture. Then, between 1675 and 1725, thousands of Irish, English and German Quakers, led by William Penn, settled in the Delaware Valley.

This settlement resulted in the formation of what is today considered the "General American" culture, although, according to Fischer, it is really just a regional American culture, even if it does today encompass most of the U.S. from the mid-Atlantic states to the Pacific Coast. Finally, Irish, Scottish, and English settlers from the borderlands of Britain and Ireland migrated to Appalachia between 1717 and 1775. They formed the regional culture of the Upland South, which has since spread west to such areas as West Texas and parts of the U.S. Southwest. Fischer says that the modern U.S. is composed only of regional cultures, with characteristics determined by the place of departure and time of arrival of these four distinct founding populations.

== Criticisms ==
=== Gun violence ===
The US is considered to have some of the most permissive gun laws among developed countries. Americans make up 4 percent of the world's population but own 46 percent of the global stock of privately held firearms. This is about 294 million guns with a population of 301 million (2007 figures), almost one gun for every American on average. In 2001–2002, the United States had above-average levels of violent crime and particularly high levels of gun violence compared to other developed nations. A cross-sectional analysis of the World Health Organization Mortality Database from 2010 showed that United States "homicide rates were 7.0 times higher than in other high-income countries, driven by a gun homicide rate that was 25.2 times higher." Gun ownership rights continue to be the subject of contentious political debate.

=== Money in politics ===
In his dissent in Citizens United v. Federal Election Commission, Supreme Court Justice John Paul Stevens wrote:

In the context of election to public office, the distinction between corporate and human speakers is significant. Although they make enormous contributions to our society, corporations are not actually members of it. They cannot vote or run for office. Because they may be managed and controlled by nonresidents, their interests may conflict in fundamental respects with the interests of eligible voters. The financial resources, legal structure, and instrumental orientation of corporations raise legitimate concerns about their role in the electoral process. Our lawmakers have a compelling constitutional basis, if not also a democratic duty, to take measures designed to guard against the potentially deleterious effects of corporate spending in local and national races.

=== Wealth gap ===
In the 2013 documentary Inequality for All, Robert Reich argued that income inequality is a defining issue for the United States. He stated that 95% of post-recession economic gains went to the top 1% net worth (HNWI) since 2009, when the recovery is agreed to have started.

== See also ==
- American middle class
- American dream
- Protestant work ethic
- Social structure of the United States
- Body contact and personal space in the United States
