= Successor culture =

A successor culture is a culture that succeeds another previous culture or civilization. It refers to a culture or civilization that arises after the decline or collapse of an earlier society and often builds upon or inherits aspects of the preceding culture. The successor culture may incorporate elements of the previous culture while also introducing new ideas, practices, or institutions. The successor culture concept is commonly employed in archaeology and anthropology to study cultural evolution and societal changes over time.

== See also ==
- Cultural amalgamation
