= Non-material culture =

Thoughts or ideas that make up a culture

Culture consists of both material culture and non-material culture. Thoughts or ideas that make up a culture are called the non-material culture. In contrast to material culture, non-material culture does not include any physical objects or artifacts. Examples of non-material culture include any ideals, ideas, beliefs, values, norms that may help shape society.

== Language ==
Language and culture are closely tied together and can affect one another. One example of culture shaping language is the case of the Pirahã people. Their lack of words for numbers makes it impossible for them to have complex mathematical systems in their culture. This could be a result of their cultural requirements: because they have no need for extensive mathematics, there would be no need for them to form number words. The formation of American slang can also serve as a reflection of culture and has changed as American culture developed. For example, as people began speaking out in defense of homosexuality in the 1960s, vulgar language and slang became more acceptable to use and began to be included in dictionaries.

The theory based on the works of Edward Sapir and Benjamin Lee Whorf holds that language actually limits and shapes how people see the world around them. This theory of linguistic relativity would indicate that language influences the way people understand the world.

== Symbols ==
In his 1973 book, The Interpretation of Cultures, anthropologist Clifford Geertz refers to culture as "a system of inherited conceptions expressed in symbolic forms by means of which men communicate, perpetuate, and develop their knowledge about and attitudes toward life," expressing the importance he placed on symbols in culture. Just like language, symbols form as a culture grows. People in a particular society attribute meaning to specific objects, and that imbued meaning transforms that object into a widely recognized symbol in that society. There can be symbols that cross cultural boundaries. For example, a cross is a universal symbol of Christianity, and is so universally known due to the prevalence of Christianity in different cultures. Though the first stop sign first appeared in Michigan in the United States, the physical attributes are so well known in many different cultures due to its use in so many different countries. Some symbols have meaning only to a particular culture. In American culture, a white picket fence is a widely recognized symbol for a successful and happy suburban life.

== Behavior ==
The culture that an individual is part of influences several aspects of that individual, including behavior. Through socialization, an individual will learn the values and norms inherent in their society and, in most cases, will behave according to those values and norms. Behavior is important because it can convey the values of a society. For example, in Japanese culture, which depends on the "fundamental relatedness of individuals" it is important to fit in with those around you and maintain harmonious personal relationships. Individuals in Japanese culture behave to avoid exclusion from society, putting flexibility, empathy, and self-restraint above expression of personal thoughts and opinions.

Behavior can also influence a culture. This can be seen in the caste system in India. In higher caste levels, it is customary for an individual to follow Sanskritic customs. Those in the lower caste levels take on this behavior in order to move up in the caste system. This type of behavior has had an influence on Indian culture: the numerous lower caste individuals participating in Sanskritic customs helped spread those customs all throughout India.

== See also ==
- Intangible cultural heritage
