= Cultural pluralism =

Multiple unique cultural identities within a larger society

Cultural pluralism is a term used when smaller groups within a larger society maintain their unique cultural identities, whereby their values and practices are accepted by the dominant culture, provided such are consistent with the laws and values of the wider society. As a sociological term, the definition and description of cultural pluralism has evolved. It has been described as not only a fact but a societal goal.

== Pluralist culture ==
In a pluralist culture, groups not only co-exist side by side but also consider qualities of other groups as traits worth having in the dominant culture. Pluralistic societies place strong expectations of integration on members, rather than expectations of assimilation. The existence of such institutions and practices is possible if the cultural communities are accepted by the larger society in a pluralist culture and sometimes require the protection of the law. Often, the acceptance of a culture may require that the new or minority culture remove some aspects of their culture which is incompatible with the laws or values of the dominant culture. As time progresses pluralistic societies often experience some degree of amalgamation. The pluralist Hamed Kazemzadeh argues that the concept of pluralist culture has been prevalent since ancient times; for example, the Achaemenid Empire, which was founded by Cyrus the Great, successfully followed a policy of incorporating and tolerating various cultures.

== Distinction from multiculturalism ==
Cultural pluralism is distinct from multiculturalism, which lacks the requirement of a dominant culture. If the dominant culture is weakened, societies can easily pass from cultural pluralism into multiculturalism without any intentional steps being taken by that society. If communities function separately from each other, or compete with one another, they are not considered culturally pluralistic.

In 1971, the Canadian government referred to cultural pluralism, as opposed to multiculturalism, as the "very essence" of the nation's identity. Cultural pluralism can be practiced at varying degrees by a group or an individual. A prominent example of pluralism is the United States, in which a dominant culture with strong elements of nationalism, a sporting culture, and an artistic culture contained also smaller groups with their own ethnic, religious, and cultural norms.

== History ==
The notion of cultural pluralism in the United States has its roots in the transcendentalist movement, and was developed by pragmatist philosophers such as Horace Kallen, William James, and John Dewey. Randolph Bourne, a later theorist, provided one of the most famous articulations of cultural pluralism through his 1916 essay, "Trans-National America".

Kallen is widely credited as being the originator of the concept of cultural pluralism. His 1915 essay in The Nation, titled "Democracy versus the Melting Pot", was written as an argument against the concept of the 'Americanization' of European immigrants. He coined the term cultural pluralism, itself, in 1924 through his Culture and Democracy in the United States.

In 1976, the concept was further explored by Merwin Crawford Young in The Politics of Cultural Pluralism. Young's work, in African studies, emphasizes the flexibility of the definition of cultural pluralism within a society. More recent advocates include moral and cultural anthropologist Richard Shweder.

A 1976 article in the Journal of Sociology and Social Welfare offered a redefinition of cultural pluralism, described as a social condition in which communities of different cultures live together and function in an open system.

== See also ==
- Pluriculturalism
