= Salad bowl (cultural idea) =

Metaphoric term

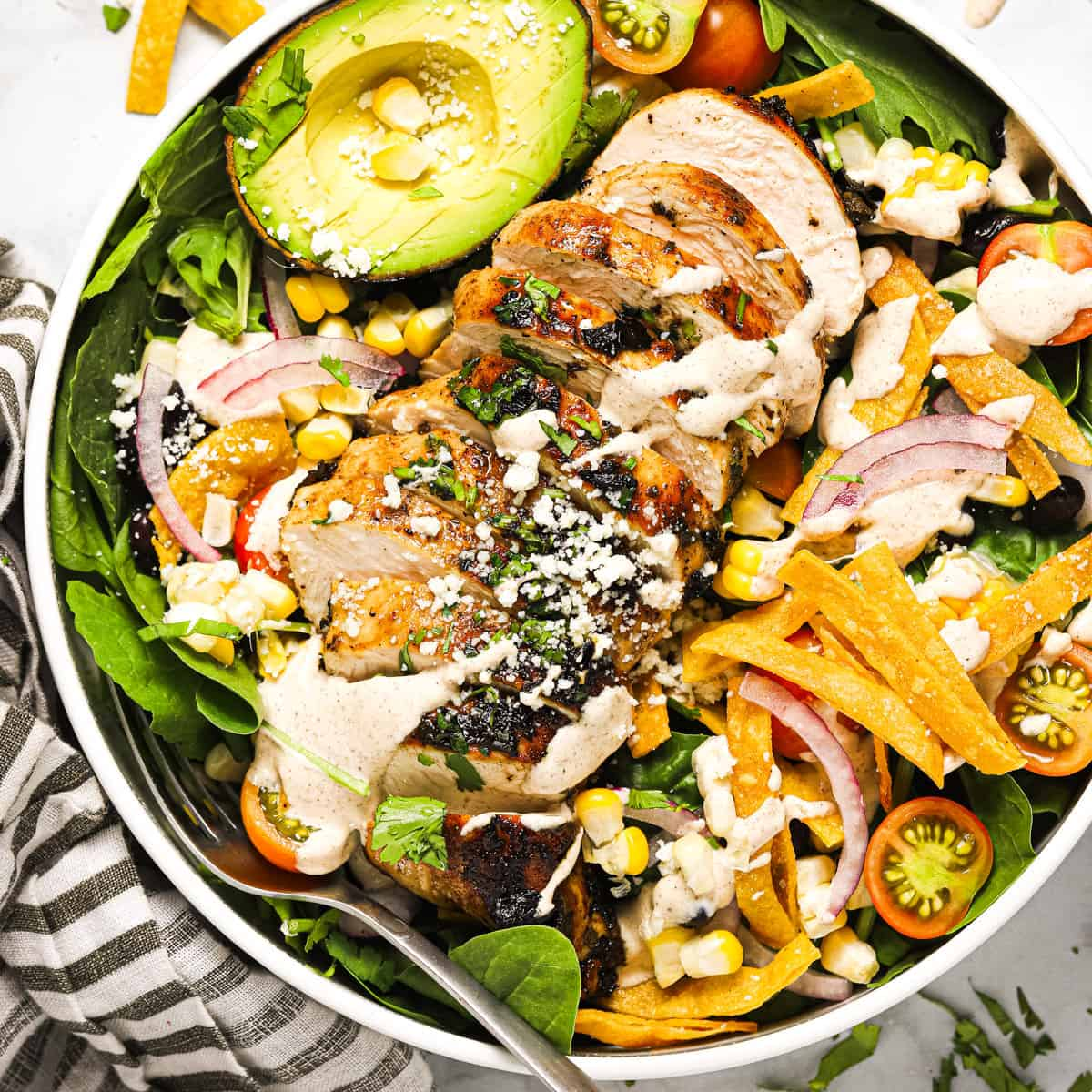
Various distinct components can combine to make a salad.

A salad bowl or tossed salad is a metaphor for the way an intercultural society can integrate different cultures while maintaining their separate identities, contrasting with a melting pot, which emphasizes the combination of the parts into a single whole. In Canada the tossed salad metaphor is common, but this concept is also commonly approximated by cultural mosaic.

In the salad bowl model, different cultures are brought together—like salad ingredients—but do not form together into a single homogeneous culture; each culture keeps its own distinct qualities. This idea proposes a society of many individual cultures, since the latter suggests that ethnic groups may be unable to preserve their heritage.

New York City can be considered a "salad bowl". A European example is its policy for "integration of non-European nationals", which finances and promotes integration initiatives targeting those who are not members of the European Union. This project aims to encourage dialogue in civil society, develop integration models, and spread and highlight the best initiatives regarding integration.

The salad bowl idea in practice has its supporters and detractors. Supporters argue that being "American" does not inherently tie a person to a single culture, though rather to citizenship and loyalty to the United States. Thus, one does not need to abandon one's cultural heritage in order to be considered "American". Critics tend to oppose the idea in tandem with other critiques on multiculturalism, saying that the US needs to have a common culture in order to preserve a common national identity.

== See also ==
- Multiculturalism in Canada

== Sources ==
- Lind, Michael. The Next American Nation: The New Nationalism and the Fourth American Revolution. 1996
- Schmidt, Alvin J. The Menace of Multiculturalism: Trojan Horse in America. 1997
- Huntington, Samuel P. Who Are We?: The Challenges to America's National Identity. 2005
- Chua, Amy. Day of Empire: How Hyperpowers Rise to Global Dominance and Why They Fall. 2007
- Kolb, Eva. The Evolution of New York City's Multiculturalism: Melting Pot or Salad Bowl. 2009
