= Material culture =

Physical aspects of culture

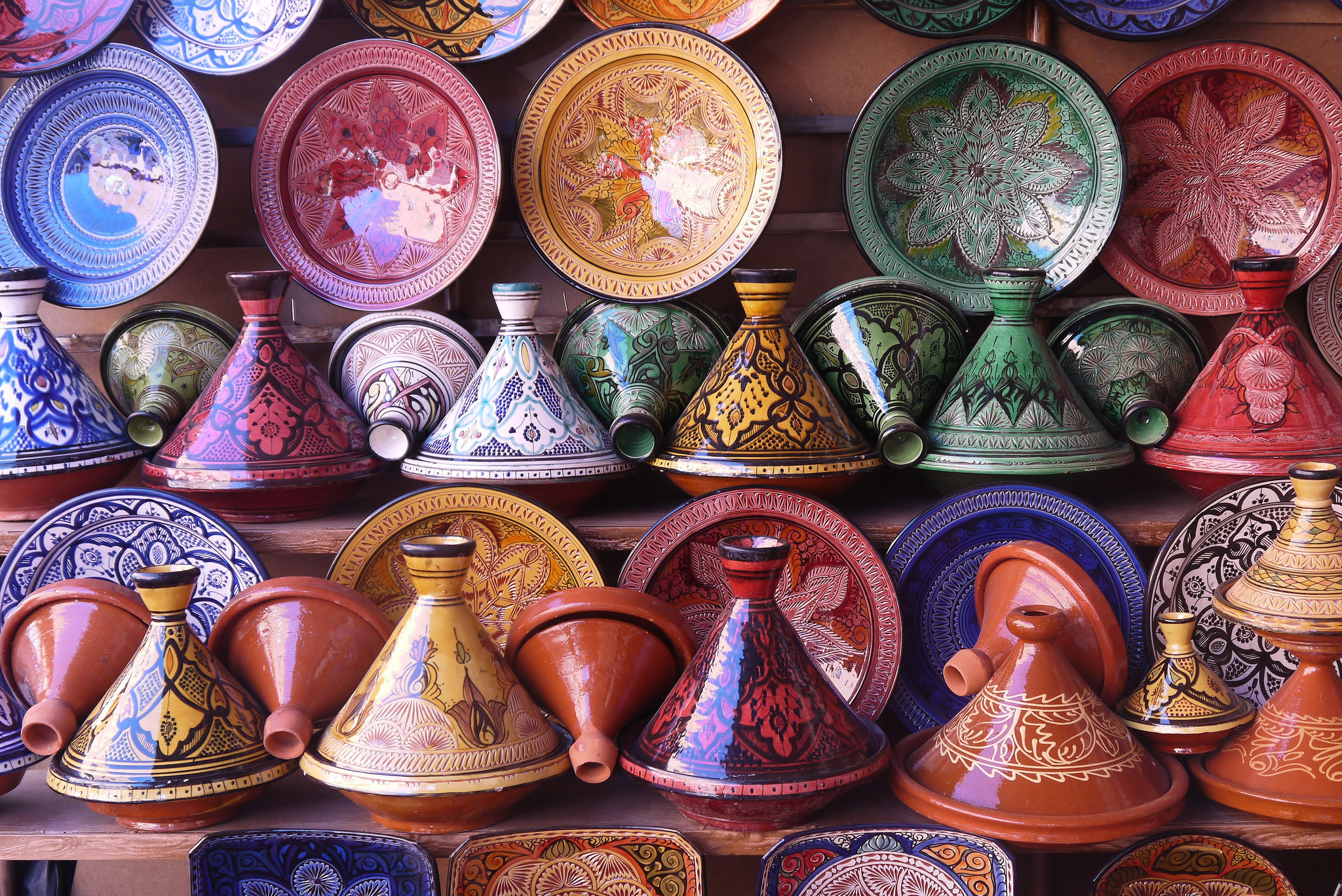
Pottery is an easily recognised form of material culture as it is commonly found as archaeological artifacts, representing cultures of the past.

Material culture is culture manifested by the physical objects and architecture of a society. The term is primarily used in archaeology and anthropology, but is also of interest to sociology, geography and history. The field considers artifacts in relation to their specific cultural and historic contexts, communities and belief systems. It includes the usage, consumption, creation and trade of objects as well as the behaviors, norms and rituals that the objects create or take part in.

Material culture is contrasted with symbolic culture or non-material culture, which include non-material symbols, beliefs and social constructs. However, some scholars include in material culture other intangible phenomena like sound, smell and events, while some even consider it to include language and media. Material culture can be described as any object that humans use to survive, define social relationships, represent facets of identity, or benefit peoples' state of mind, social, or economic standing.

The scholarly analysis of material culture, which can include both human made and natural or altered objects, is called material culture studies. It is an interdisciplinary field and methodology that tells of the relationships between people and their things: the making, history, preservation and interpretation of objects. It draws on both theory and practice from the social sciences and humanities such as art history, archaeology, anthropology, history, historic preservation, folklore, archival science, literary criticism and museum studies.

== Material value ==
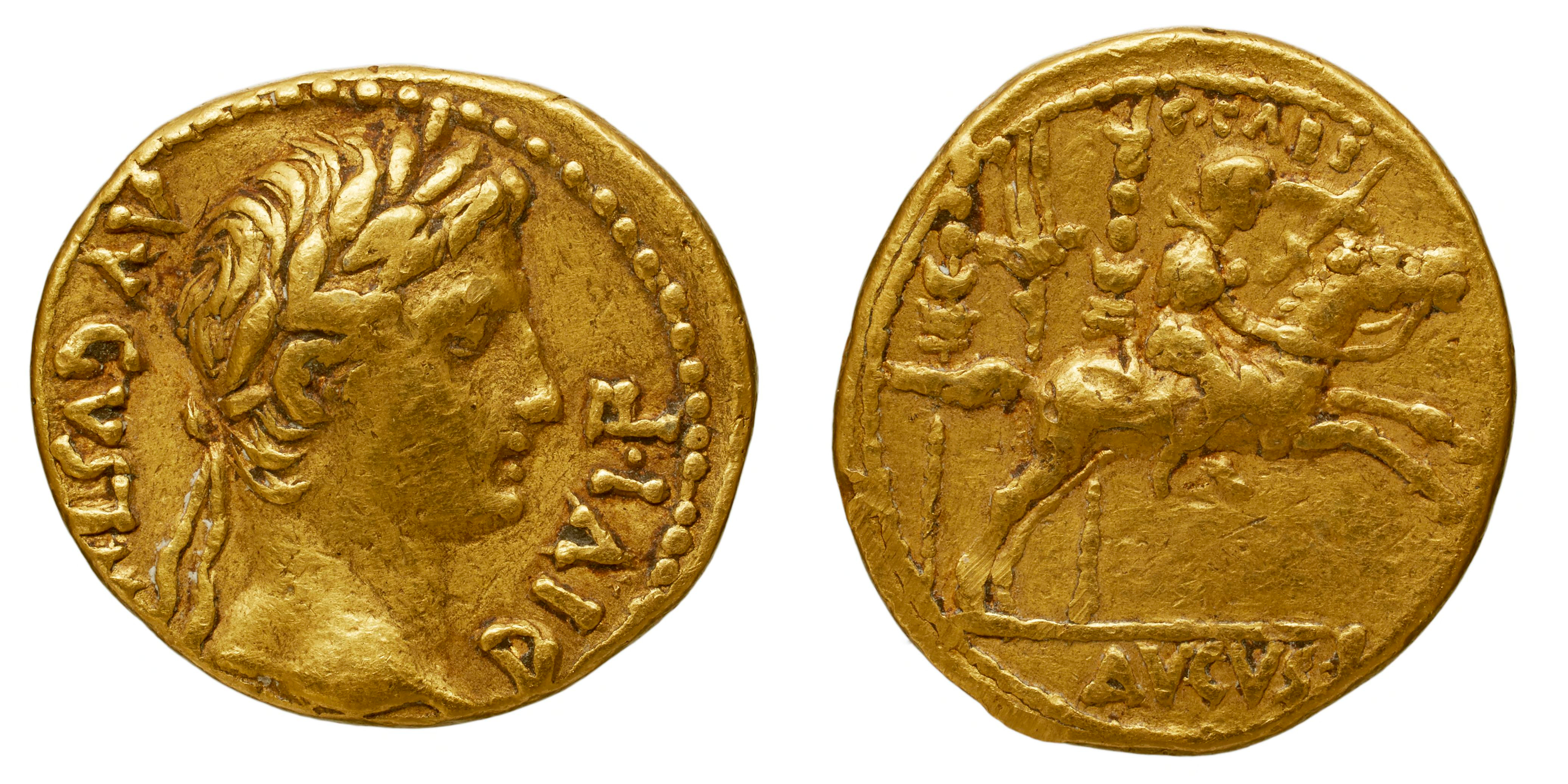
Roman coin, the aureus

Research in several areas looks into the reasons for perceiving an object as having meaning. Common reasons for valuing material lie in their monetary or sentimental value.

A well-known related theory is Daniel Kahneman's endowment effect theory. According to Kahneman, people infuse objects they own with a higher value than they do if they do not own the object. The endowment effect is found to occur as soon as an item is acquired and the effect increases over time.

Another way in which material can hold meaning and value is by carrying communication between people, just like other communication forms such as speech, touch and gesture. An object can mediate messages between time or space or both between people who are not together. A work of art, for example, can transfer a message from the creator to the viewer and share an image, a feeling, or an experience. Material can contain memories and mutual experiences across time and influence thoughts and feelings. A study found that couples who have more items that were jointly acquired and more favorite items among them had higher-quality relationships.

Researchers from the fields of sociology, psychology, and anthropology have also been fascinated by gift-giving, a universal phenomenon that holds emotional meaning using material culture. According to Schieffelin, "gift-giving is a vehicle of social obligation and political maneuver." Mauss defines the gift as creating a special bond between the giver and the receiver. According to Mauss, the giver never really leaves the gift but becomes part of the receiver's future by inserting the gift into their life. A gift leads at some point to another gift in response, which creates a special reciprocal bond between people.

== History ==
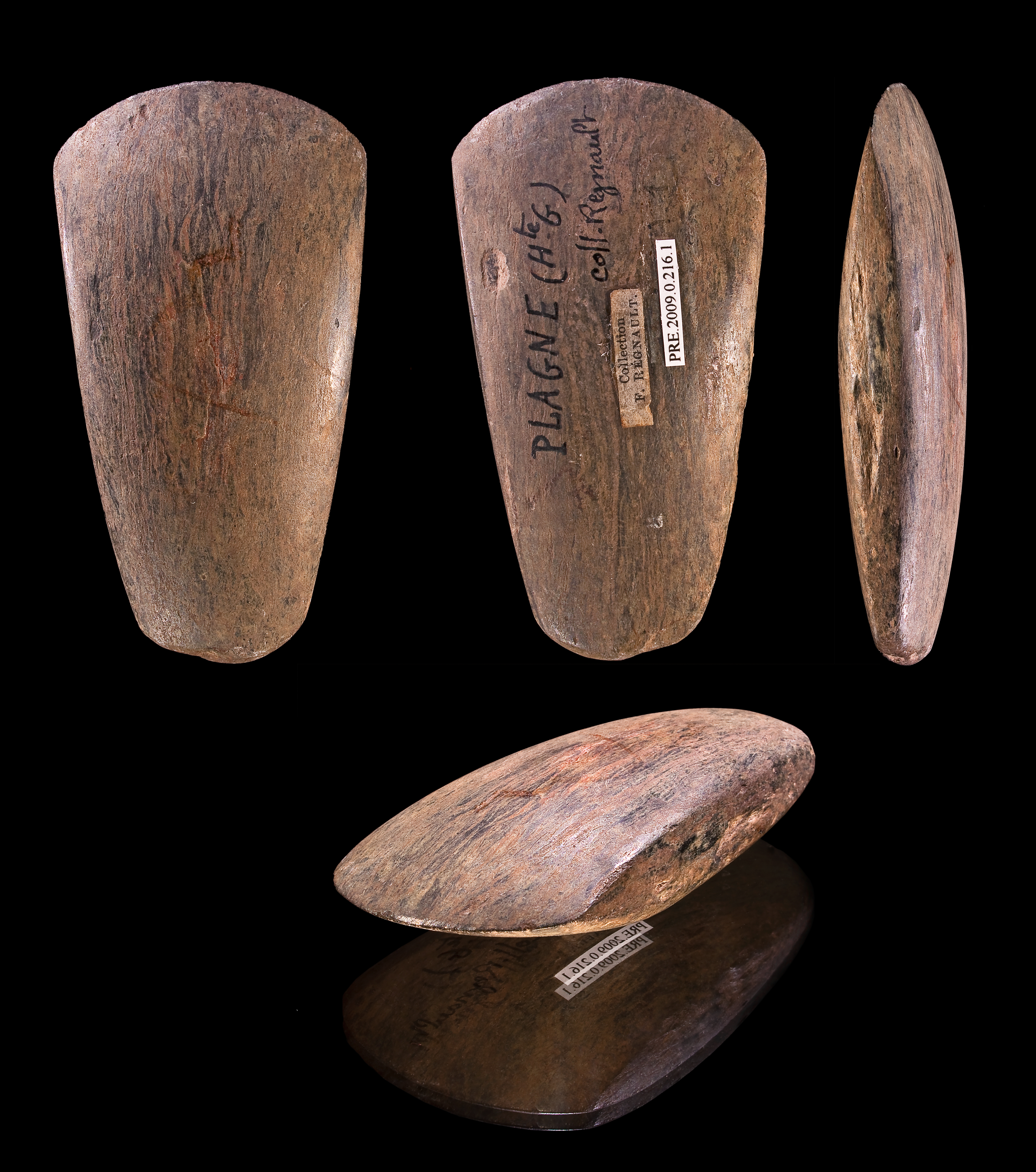
Finding tools of the past is considered a way to discover the level of development of a culture.

The academic field itself of studying material culture is historically rooted in Western colonial-era anthropology—which initially was focused on non-Western material culture almost exclusively. This early focus often served to categorize, marginalize, and hierarchize the originating cultures.

During the "golden age" of museum-going, the presentation of material cultures typically illustrated a perceived social evolution that contrasted the 'simple' objects of non-Westerners to the advanced objects of Europeans. It presumed to position European society at the developed, most evolved stage with non-Western cultures placed at a lesser or beginning stage. Eventually, scholars left behind the notion that culture evolved though predictable cycles of development, and the study of material culture changed to assume a more objective view of non-Western material culture.

The field of material culture studies as its own distinct discipline dates to the 1990s. The Journal of Material Culture began publishing in 1996. Collecting habits date back hundreds of years.

== Contributors ==
Leslie White was an American anthropologist, known for his advocacy of theories of cultural evolution, sociocultural evolution, and especially neoevolutionism and for his role in creating the department of anthropology at the University of Michigan Ann Arbor. He was president of the American Anthropological Association (1964). He wrote The Science of Culture in 1949 in which he outlined schema of the world as divided into cultural, biological, and physical levels of phenomenon. White believed that the development of culture rested primarily on technology and that the history of human technology could be understood through the study of human-produced materials.

American anthropologist James Deetz, known for his work in the field of historical archaeology, wrote the book "In Small Things Forgotten" in 1977 and published a revised and expanded version in 1996. He pioneered there the ideas of using neglected substances such as trash pits, potshards, and soil stains to reveal human actions. By analyzing objects in association with their location, the history of that location, the objects they were found with, and not singling out the most valuable or rarest ones, archaeologists can create a more accurate picture of daily life. Deetz looks at the long view of history and investigates the impact of European culture on other cultures across the globe by an analysis of the spread of everyday objects.

Ian M. G. Quimby's Material Culture and the Study of American Life, written in 1978, tried to bridge the gaps between the museum world and the university and between curator and historian. Quimby posits that objects in museums are understood through an intellectual framework that uses non-traditional sources. He also describes the benefits of work on exhibit design as a vehicle for education.

Thomas Schlereth, Professor Emeritus of American Studies at the University of Notre Dame, wrote about philosophies and methods of teaching history outside the traditional classroom. In his book Artifacts and the American Past, Schlereth defines material culture study as an attempt to explain why things were made, why they took the forms they did, and what social, functional, aesthetic, or symbolic needs they serve. He advocates studying photographs, catalogues, maps and landscapes. He suggests a variety of modes for interrogating artifacts.

Professor Kiki Smith of Smith College, asserts that "…clothes can reveal much about lives from the past", and that garments preserved in collections are akin to other artifacts, including books, diaries, paintings and letters. She established the Smith College Historic Clothing Collection with 3000 items for the college's theater department. This archive of women's clothing and accessories, from all social classes, is a resource for courses in costume design, history, material culture, and literary history and curatorial practices.

Gerd Koch, associated with the Ethnological Museum of Berlin, is known for his studies on the material culture of Tuvalu, Kiribati and the Santa Cruz Islands. During his early field work in 1951 to 1952, Koch developed techniques in the recording of culture, including the use of tape recorders and cinematographic cameras.

== Archaeology ==
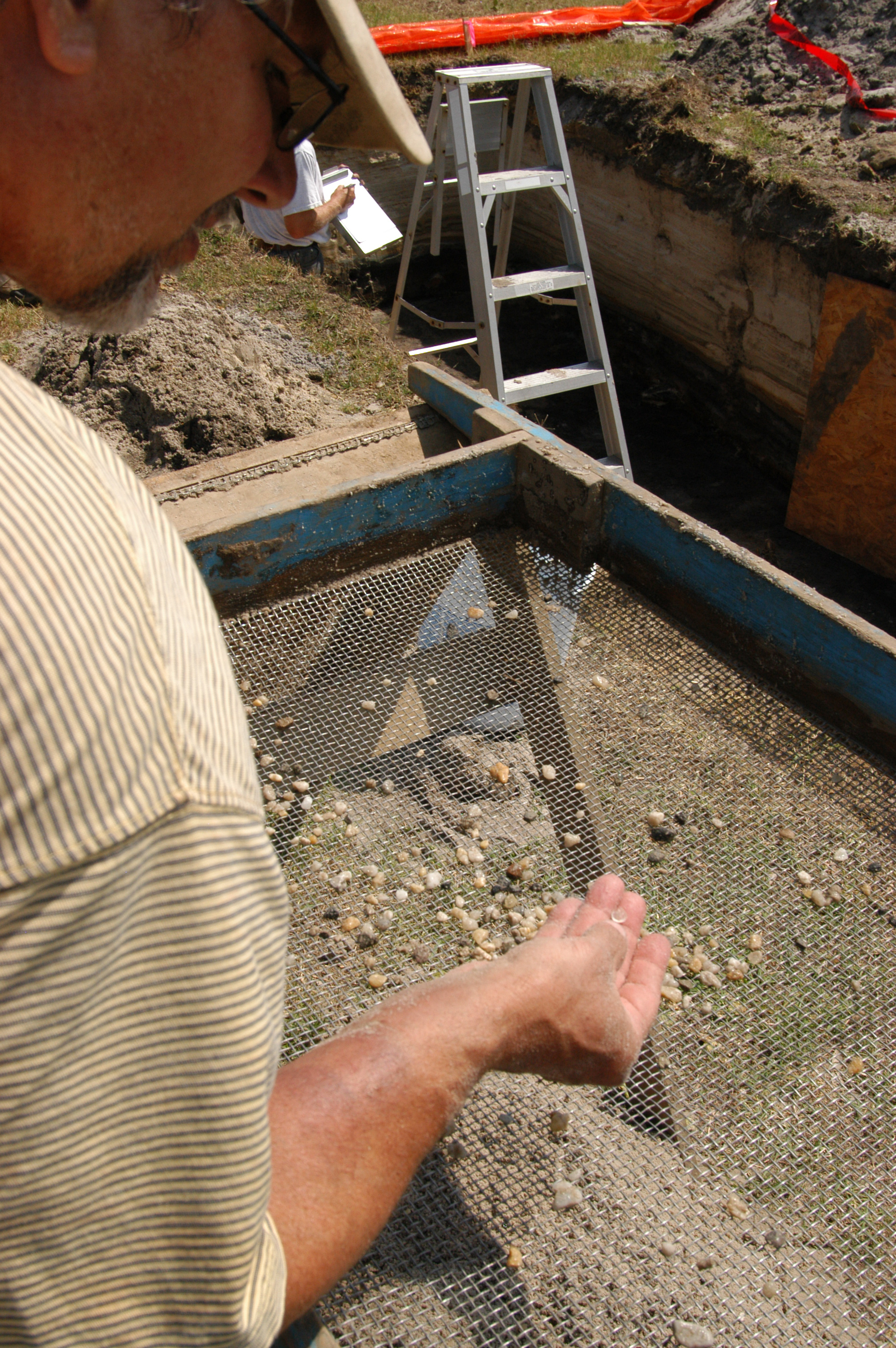
An archaeologist searches for evidence of glass objects among ruins.

Archaeology is the study of humanity through the inferential analysis of material culture to ultimately gain an understanding of the daily lives of past cultures and the overarching trend of human history. An archaeological culture is a recurring assemblage of the artifacts from a specific time and place, most often that has no written record. These physical artifacts are then used to make inferences about the ephemeral aspects of culture and history. With more recent societies, written histories, oral traditions, and direct observations may also be available to supplement the study of material culture.

Beginning in the European Renaissance and the culture's fascination with classical antiquities, the study of artifacts from long-lost cultures has produced many forms of archaeological theory, such as trans-cultural diffusion, processual archaeology, and post-processual archaeology. Additionally, archaeological sub-disciplines have emerged within the field, including prehistoric archaeology, classical archaeology, historical archaeology, cognitive archaeology, and cultural ecology. Recently, a scientific methodology and approach to the analysis of pre-historic material culture has become prevalent with systematic excavation techniques producing detailed and precise results.

== Anthropology ==
Anthropology is the study of humans both past and present.

Anthropology is most simply defined as the study of humans across time and space. In studying a human culture, an anthropologist studies the material culture of the people in question as well as the people themselves and their interactions with others. To understand the culture in which an object is featured, an anthropologist looks at the object itself, its context, and the way that it was manufactured and used.

The first anthropologist interested in studying material culture was Lewis Henry Morgan, in the mid-19th century. He is most known for his research on kinship and social structures, but he also studied the effect of material culture, specifically technology, on the evolution of a society. Later in the 19th century, Franz Boas brought the fields of anthropology and material culture studies closer together. He believed that it was crucial for an anthropologist to analyze not only the physical properties of material culture but also its meanings and uses in its indigenous context to begin to understand a society. At the same time in France, Émile Durkheim wrote about the importance of material culture in understanding a society. Durkheim saw material culture as one of the social facts that functions as a coercive force to maintain solidarity in a society.

Claude Lévi-Strauss, in the 20th century, included the study of material culture in his work as an anthropologist because he believed that it could reveal a deeper level of structure and meaning unattainable by typical fieldwork. According to Lévi-Strauss, material culture can recall the mindset of a people, regardless of intervening time or space. Also in the 20th century, Mary Douglas thought that anthropology was about studying the meaning of material culture to the people who experience it. Marvin Harris, a contemporary of Douglas, put forward the theory of cultural materialism and said that all aspects of society have material causes.

== Sociology ==
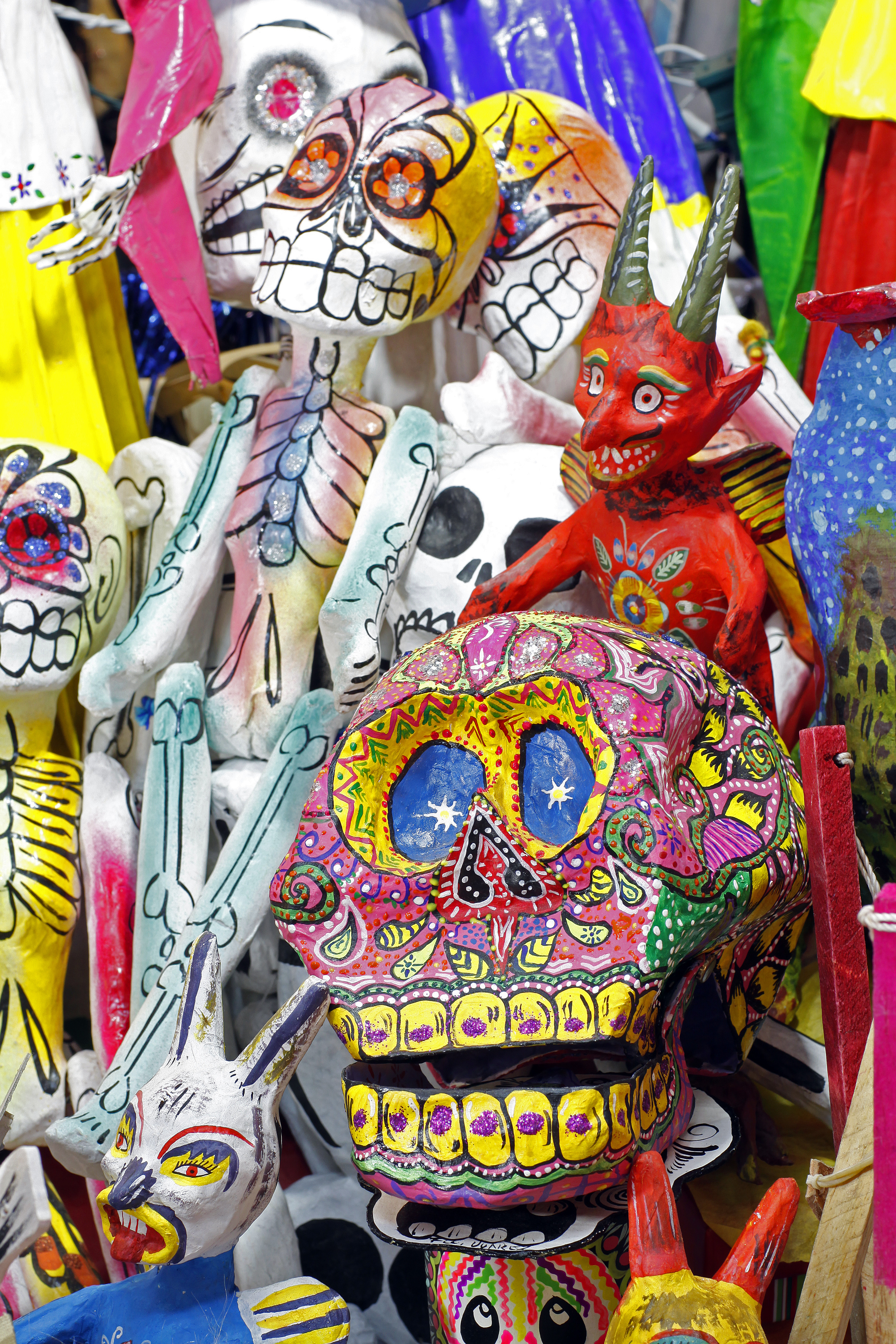
Any object created to suit humans can represent a form of material culture.

In archaeology, the idea that social relations are embodied in material is well known and established, with extensive research on exchange, gift giving and objects as part of social ceremonies and events. However, in contradiction to archaeology, where scientists build on material remains of previous cultures, sociology tends to overlook the importance of material in understanding relationships and human social behavior.

The social aspects in material culture include the social behavior around it: the way that the material is used, shared, talked about, or made. An object cannot hold meaning in and of itself and so when one focuses on the social aspects of material culture, it is critical to keep in mind that interpretations of objects and of interactions with them are the ones to evoke importance and meaning.

== Heritage industry ==
Museums and other material culture repositories, by their very nature, are often active participants in the heritage industry. Defined as "the business of managing places that are important to an area's history and encouraging people to visit them," the heritage industry relies heavily on material culture and objects to interpret cultural heritage. The industry is fueled by a cycle of people visiting museums, historic sites, and collections to interact with ideas or physical objects of the past. In turn, the institutions profit through monetary donations or admission fees as well as the publicity that comes with word-of-mouth communications.

That relationship is controversial, as many believe that the heritage industry corrupts the meaning and importance of cultural objects. Often, scholars in the humanities take a critical view of the heritage industry, particularly heritage tourism, believing it to be a vulgar oversimplification and corruption of historic fact and importance. Others believe that the relationship and the financial stability it brings is often the element that allows curators, researchers, and directors to conserve material culture's legacy.

== See also ==
- Anti-consumerism
- Symbolic culture
- Non-material culture
- Museum anthropology
- Museum folklore
