= American slang =

American slang is slang that is common in, or particular to, the United States.

The term can refer specifically to:

== Language ==
- California slang, slang used in California English, or which originates in California
- Hawaiian Pidgin, English-based Creole Language spoken in Hawaii
- U.S. Navy slang, a glossary at Wiktionary
- African American Vernacular English, a source of American slang words
- The Historical Dictionary of American Slang, the most comprehensive and thoroughly researched dictionary of American slang and the only American slang dictionary prepared entirely on historical principles

== Music ==
- American Slang, a 2010 album by rock group, The Gaslight Anthem

== See also ==
- Regional vocabularies of American English
