= Canadian values =

Commonly shared ethical and human values of Canadians

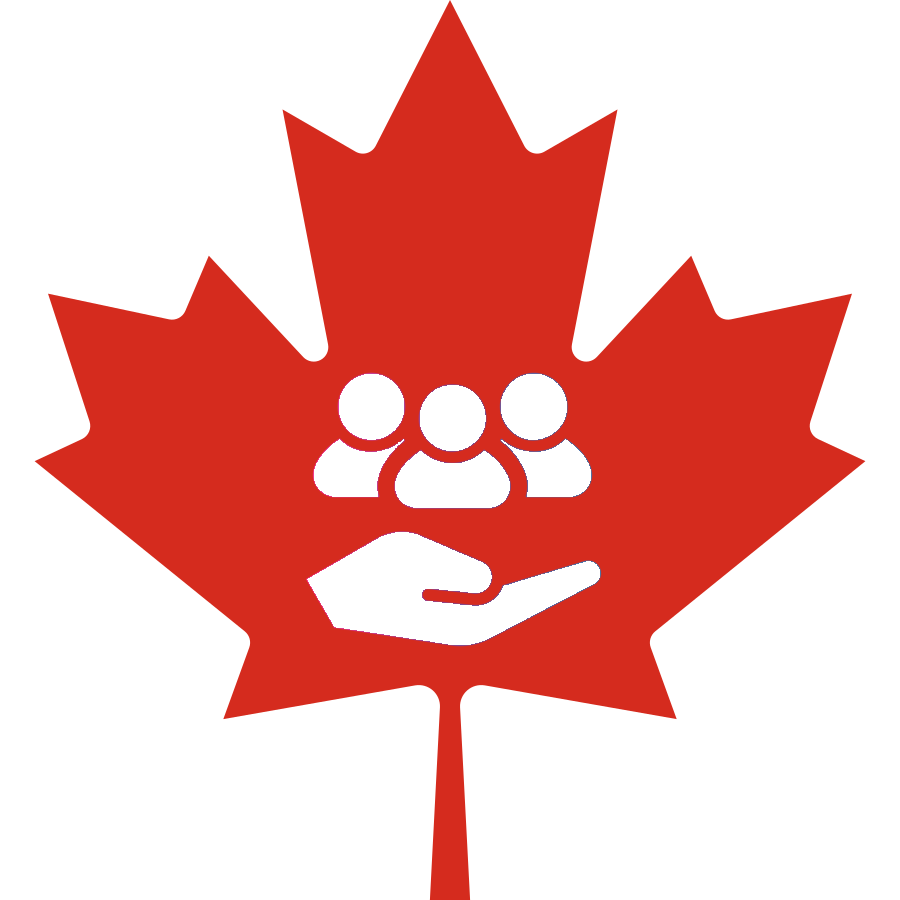

Perceived shared values

Support for democratic issues (Statistics Canada)
- Human rights: 89%
- Gender equality: 81%
- Respect for the law: 80%
- Indigenous respect: 68%
- Diversity: 67%
- Bilingualism: 55%

Support for social issues (Angus Reid Institute)
- Euthanasia rights: 80%
- LGBTQ acceptance: 70%
- Multiculturalism policy: 68%
- Secular society: 60%
- Religious symbols at work: 58%

Support for divisive issues (Angus Reid Institute)
- Free market economy: 52%
- Unrestricted abortion rights: 51%
- Civil liberties over security: 51%
- Trust in media: 51%

Canadian values are the perceived commonly shared ethical and human values of Canadians. The majority of Canadians believe they share specific values, with a plurality identifying human rights, respect for the law and gender equality as collective principles. Canadians generally exhibit pride in equality before the law, fairness, social justice, freedom, and respect for others; while often making personal decisions based on self-interests rather than a collective Canadian identity. Tolerance and sensitivity hold significant importance in Canada's multicultural society, as does politeness.

Canadians typically tend to embrace liberal views on social and political issues, with its citizens generally identifying as ideologically centrist or moderate. In Canada the idea of a "just society" is constitutionally protected, with government policies—such as publicly funded health care; higher and more progressive taxation; outlawing capital punishment; strong efforts to eliminate poverty; an emphasis on cultural diversity; the legalization of same-sex marriage, pregnancy terminations, and euthanasia—being social indicators of the country's political and cultural values. Canadians express pridefulness with the country's military peacekeeping and the national park system and the Canadian Charter of Rights and Freedoms.

Political scientist Denis Stairs connects values with Canadian nationalism, noting Canadians feel they hold special, virtuous values. Historian Ian MacKay associates Canadian values with egalitarianism, equalitarianism and peacefulness. Canada promotes its domestically shared values of democracy, human rights, diversity, the rule of law and multilateral solutions through its foreign relations participating in multiple global organizations. The majority of Canadians believe it's important for Canada to help other countries in need.

Despite Canadians progressive views, ongoing societal challenges exist, including what has variously been described as neglect, indifference and human rights violations of marginalized groups; such as the treatment of Indigenous peoples, profiling of visible minority, poverty faced by those with disabilities, concerns with the treatment of migrants and refugees and the freedom of religion and language expression in Quebec society.

== Surveys ==
=== Statistics Canada ===
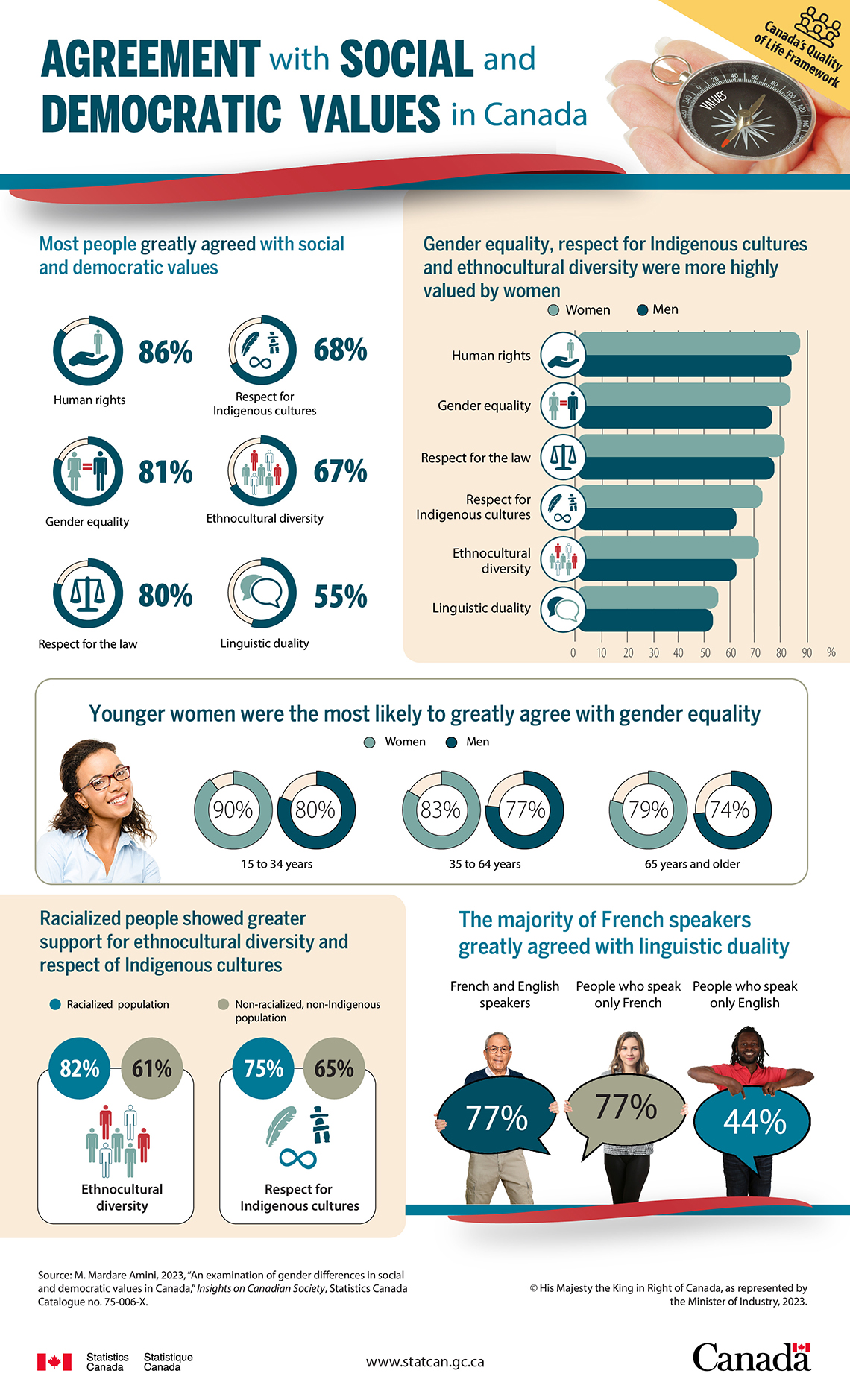

According to the 2020 General Social Survey on Social Identity by Statistics Canada, there was broad agreement amongst Canadians on the social and democratic values of human rights (86%), respect for law (80%) and gender equality (81%). Close to 7 in 10 agreed to a great extent with respect for Indigenous culture (68%) and ethnic and cultural diversity (67%), while the percentage of Canadians who were strongly supportive of having both English and French as Canada's official languages was lower, at 55%. Women and young people are more likely to support diversity and gender equality values. 92% of the population aged 15 and older agreed that ethnic or cultural diversity is a Canadian value.

With the exception of linguistic duality where there was no gender differences larger share of women agreed to a great extent with social and democratic values when compared with men. Among the values with the biggest differences across gender were respect for Indigenous cultures (73% of women agreed to a great extent, versus 63% of men); ethnic and cultural diversity (71% of women versus 62% of men) and gender equality (84% of women versus 77% of men).

Younger Canadians were also more likely to value respect for Indigenous cultures and ethnic and cultural diversity, while older Canadians placed a high degree of value on respect for law. Specifically, nearly 8 in 10 of those aged 15 to 24 (78%) agreed to a great extent with ethnic and cultural diversity and with respect for Indigenous cultures (77%). This compared with 57% and 62% of those aged 55 and older, respectively. Conversely, almost 9 in 10 Canadians aged 55 and older agreed to a great extent with respect for law (88%), compared with nearly 7 in 10 Canadians aged 15 to 24 (67%).

Higher education was related to a stronger support for social and democratic values. For instance, 87% of people with a bachelor's degree or higher agreed to a great extent with gender equality and 76% agreed strongly with ethnic and cultural diversity. This compared with 78% and 62% for those with any form of education below a bachelor's degree, respectively. Quebec residents are the most supportive of gender equality and linguistic duality.

Geographically, significant differences exist with respect to the values of gender equality and having English and French as Canada's official languages. Quebec had the largest share of residents who agreed to a great extent with gender equality (87%), while the Prairies had the lowest share (76%). Likewise, the share of Quebec residents who agreed to a great extent with linguistic duality (79%) was much higher than in the Prairies (43%). British Columbia (39%) had the lowest share of residents who agreed to a great extent with having English and French as Canada's official languages.

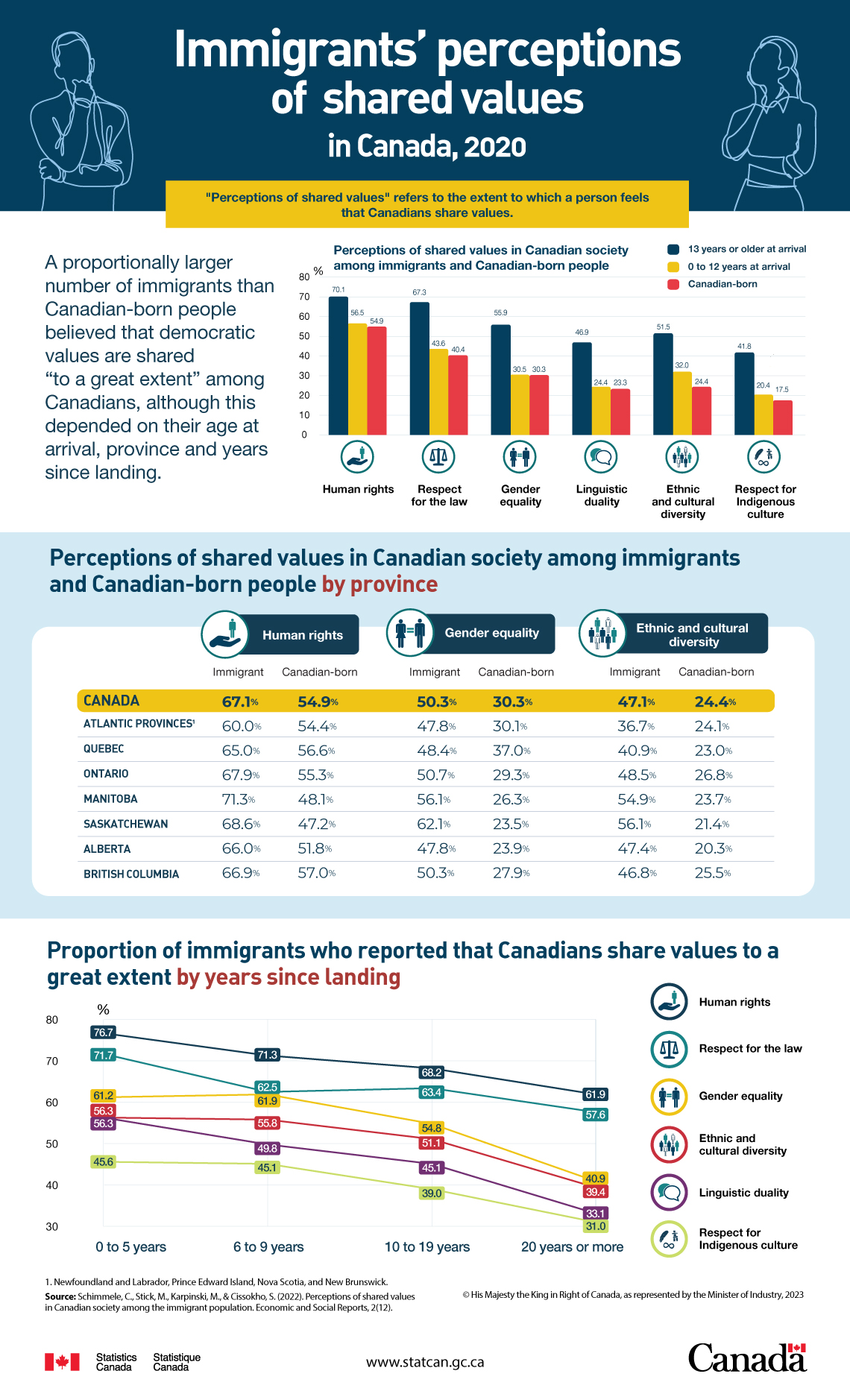

Data from 2020 shows that for immigrants who arrived in Canada at age 13 or older, a majority reported shared values in several areas, including 70.1% for human rights and 67.3% for respect for the law. In contrast, younger arrivals (ages 0 to 12) reported lower percentages, such as 56.5% for human rights and 43.6% for respect for the law. Among Canadian-born citizens, the figures are generally lower across these values, indicating a difference in perception between immigrants and native-born Canadians.

When assessing shared values by province, the statistics indicate varying beliefs. For example, in Canada overall, 67.1% of immigrants felt that human rights are respected, compared to 54.9% of Canadian-born individuals. In the Atlantic provinces, the figures stood at 60.0% for immigrants and 54.4% for Canadian-born; in Quebec, 65.0% and 56.6% respectively; in Ontario, 67.9% and 55.3%; and in Manitoba, 71.3% for immigrants and 48.1% for Canadian-born individuals.

The perception of shared values changes based on how long immigrants have been in Canada. For those who have been in the country for 0 to 5 years, a high percentage (76.7%) felt there is a strong adherence to human rights. After 20 years or more, this perception drops to 61.9%. Over the years since landing, the perception of respect for the law, gender equality, linguistic duality, ethnic and cultural diversity, and respect for Indigenous culture also showed a gradual decline..

The 2013 Statistics Canada survey showed older Canadians tended to be less confident that shared values were collectively upheld, particularly regarding ethnic and cultural diversity. Younger individuals showed more belief in these shared values, with significant declines in confidence as age increased. Additionally, women were generally less inclined than men to believe that Canadians shared specific values.

=== Angus Reid Institute ===
According to the 2020 Angus Reid Institute survey a majority of Canadians support accessible doctor-assisted dying, with 80% currently advocating for reduced regulations. The debate surrounding abortion rights continues to be contentious, especially concerning third-trimester procedures, where opinions are divided on the necessity for legislation.

A significant portion of the population prefers a secular framework, a substantial minority desires a more overt acknowledgment of faith's influence. Most Canadians (71%) are against public prayers during government meetings, yet 58% are in favor of permitting public sector employees to don religious symbols.

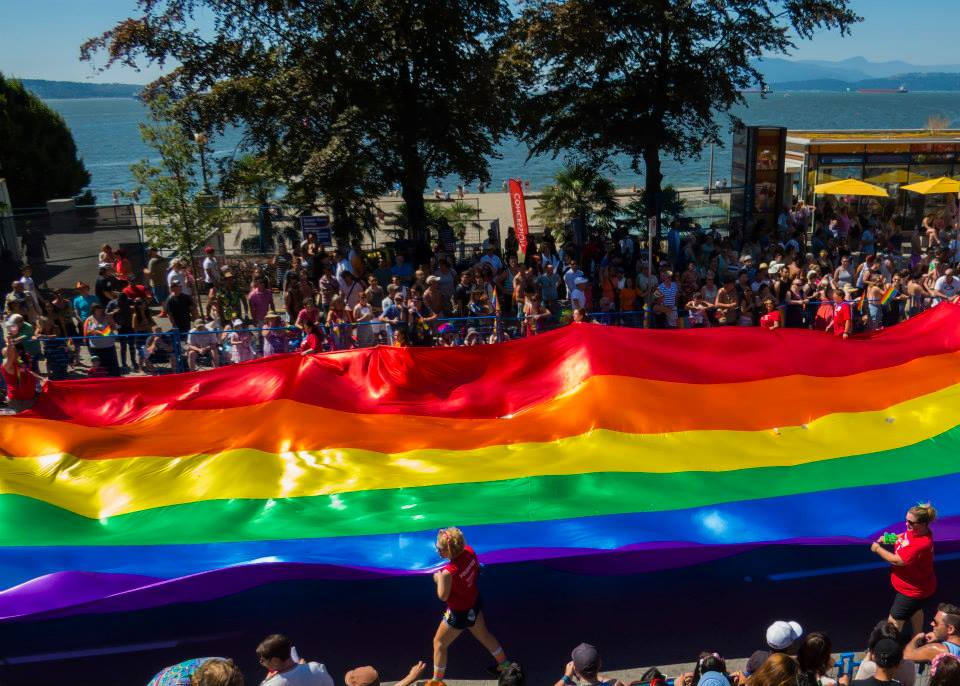
2014 Vancouver Pride Parade

Multiculturalism has seen increased support for prompting newcomers to assimilate into mainstream society, with 68% of respondents previously endorsing this perspective. Nevertheless, younger Canadians generally display a preference for cultural diversity.

Confidence in media reporting remains low, as approximately fifty percent of Canadians believe that the news media accurately conveys information. Canadians find commonality on certain matters like assisted dying and LGBTQ rights, while persisting in polarized opinions regarding abortion, economic policies, and the influence of religion in public affairs.

According to the 2016 opinion poll carried out by the Angus Reid Institute and the Canadian Broadcasting Corporation Canadians concur on several issues; however, divergent opinions emerge concerning immigration and multiculturalism. While approximately two-thirds are pleased with the integration process of newcomers into communities, many insist that minorities ought to conform more closely to mainstream cultural practices instead of preserving their own traditions and languages.

=== Nanos Research ===
Prime Minister Justin Trudeau's remarks announcing a ban on "assault-style" firearms in Canada

The 2016 "Values Survey Summary" by Nanos Research asked 1,000 Canadians ‘what are the things that make people proud about Canada’, nearly one in four said they were particularly proud of equality, equity and social justice. This was followed by a recognition of Canada's standing as peacekeepers at 19%, and values such as multiculturalism, diversity, and bilingualism at 12%. Other sources of Canadian pride included social values such as health, education, family, rights and freedoms (4%), safety, and gun control (4%) with an appreciation for nature, the outdoors, or the environment.

Canadians are most inclined to prioritize rights and freedoms, respect for others, kindness and compassion – Outcomes to non-Canadians were determined to be mostly about the three most important Canadian values, with 16% of respondents emphasizing these as being the most significant. This was closely followed by respect for others at 12% and kindness and compassion at 11%. Eight percent of those surveyed identified as saying that they had heard the words equality, equity, and social justice, as well as tolerance and acceptance.

=== Canadian Race Relations Foundation ===
According to the 2014 "Canadian Race Relations Foundation's" report on Canadian values, the fundamental values cherished by Canadians are freedom, equality, and loyalty to their nation. Additionally, they place high importance on civility and social etiquette. Canadians commonly rated "respect for human rights and freedoms" and "equality and equal access to basic needs" as their top priorities.

=== Index of Well Being ===
According to the 2012 Canadian Index of Well Being by the University of Waterloo, Canadian values include:

- fairness
- inclusion
- democracy
- economic security
- safety
- sustainability
- diversity
- equity
- health

=== Citizens' Forum on Canada's Future ===
A survey for Citizens' Forum on Canada's Future in 1991 identified the following Canadian values:

- Equality and fairness
- Consultation and dialogue
- Accommodation and tolerance
- Diversity
- Patriotism
- Freedom, Peace and Nonviolent change.

=== Support for foreign aid ===
A 2024 survey by Abacus Data indicated that Canadians generally support Canada's global engagement, particularly in providing international assistance. A separate poll by CanWaCH found that 81% of Canadians support Canada providing Official Development Assistance funding. Furthermore, 77% of Canadians believe it's important for Canada to help other countries in need. Approximately 80% to 90% of Canadians "strongly support" maintaining an active role on the global stage, and that the nation's peacekeeping roles is the country's top contribution in international affairs.

== Canada's constitution ==
The Canadian Charter of Rights and Freedoms (part of the Constitution of Canada) was intended to be a source of Canadian values and national unity. As Professor Alan Cairns noted, "the initial federal government premise was on developing a pan-Canadian identity". Former premier of Ontario Bob Rae has stated that the Charter "functions as a symbol for all Canadians" in practice because it represents the core value of freedom.

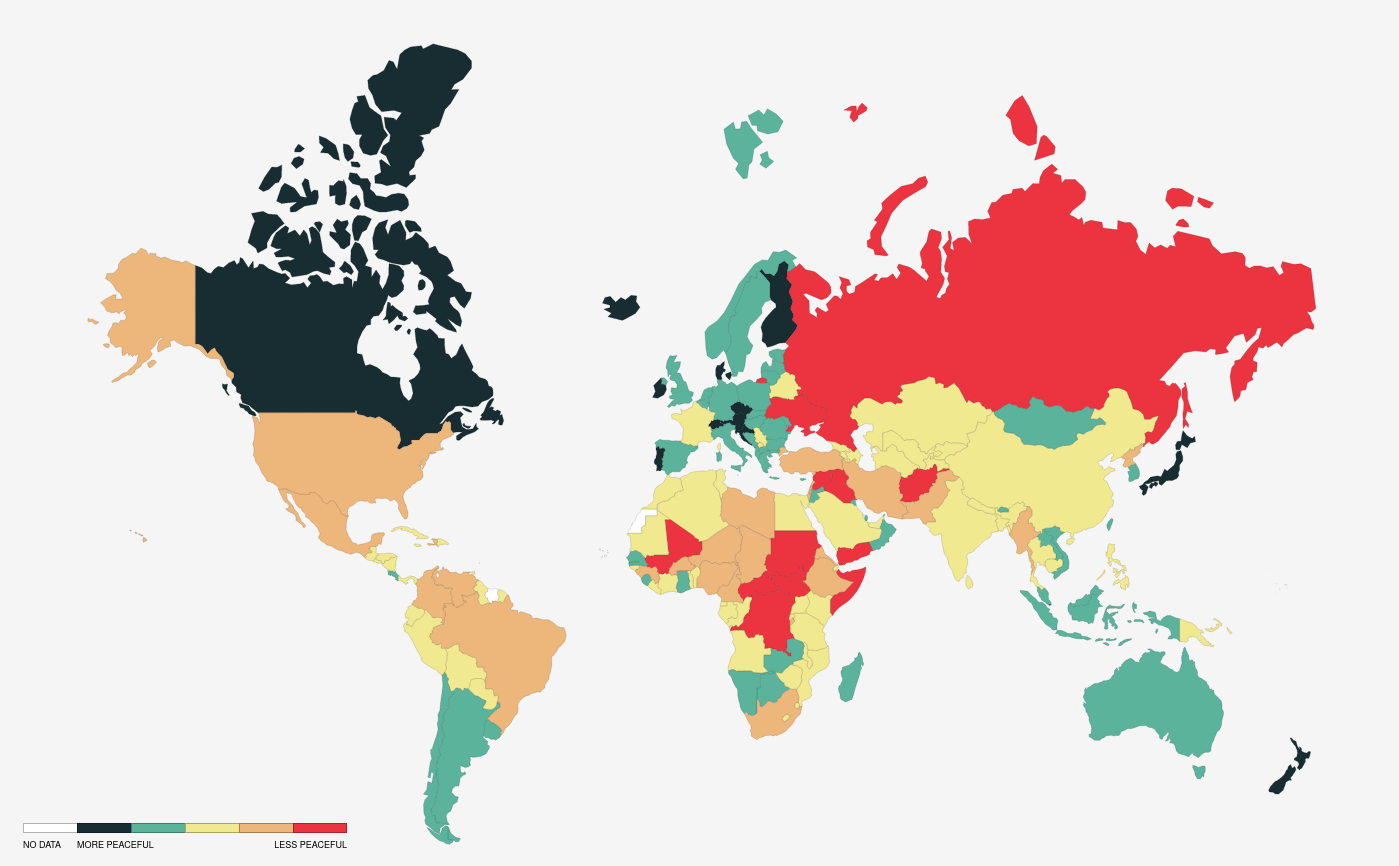
Global Peace Index 2023. Countries appearing with a deeper shade of green are ranked as more peaceful, countries appearing more red are ranked as more violent.

According to John Kirton there are six fundamental values enshrined in Canada's constitution that unify Canadians domestically and internationally, distinguishing them from citizens of other nations shaping their foreign and domestic policies. The first value is globalism, which embodies the belief in Canadians as essential members of a fully interconnected global community. The second value is multiculturalism, highlighting a core dedication to diversity and the respect for minority rights.The third value is openness to the external world, encompassing Canada's multicultural population, the predominant English and French languages, its civil and common law legal systems, as well as the exchange of ideas, education, goods, services, investments, finance, and ecological resources.The fourth value is anti-militarism, indicating a general reluctance to employ military force, especially nuclear weapons, to exert global influence. The fifth value is environmentalism, which reflects a widespread conviction among Canadians that global environmental protection should take precedence in foreign policy. The sixth value emphasizes Canada's need to engage in international institutions to influence global order.

Lydia Miljan, a political scientist expressed that core Canadian values include “self reliance, limited government, and what are often labelled traditional family values.”

=== Monarchy ===
Michael Ignatieff, the Liberal leader in 2009–11, in 2004 rooted Canadian values in a historic loyalty to the Crown. Likewise the Conservative Party in 2009 pointed to support for the monarchy of Canada as a core Canadian value. Richard Gwyn has suggested that "tolerance" has replaced "loyalty" as the touchstone of Canadian identity.

=== Shaping foreign policy ===
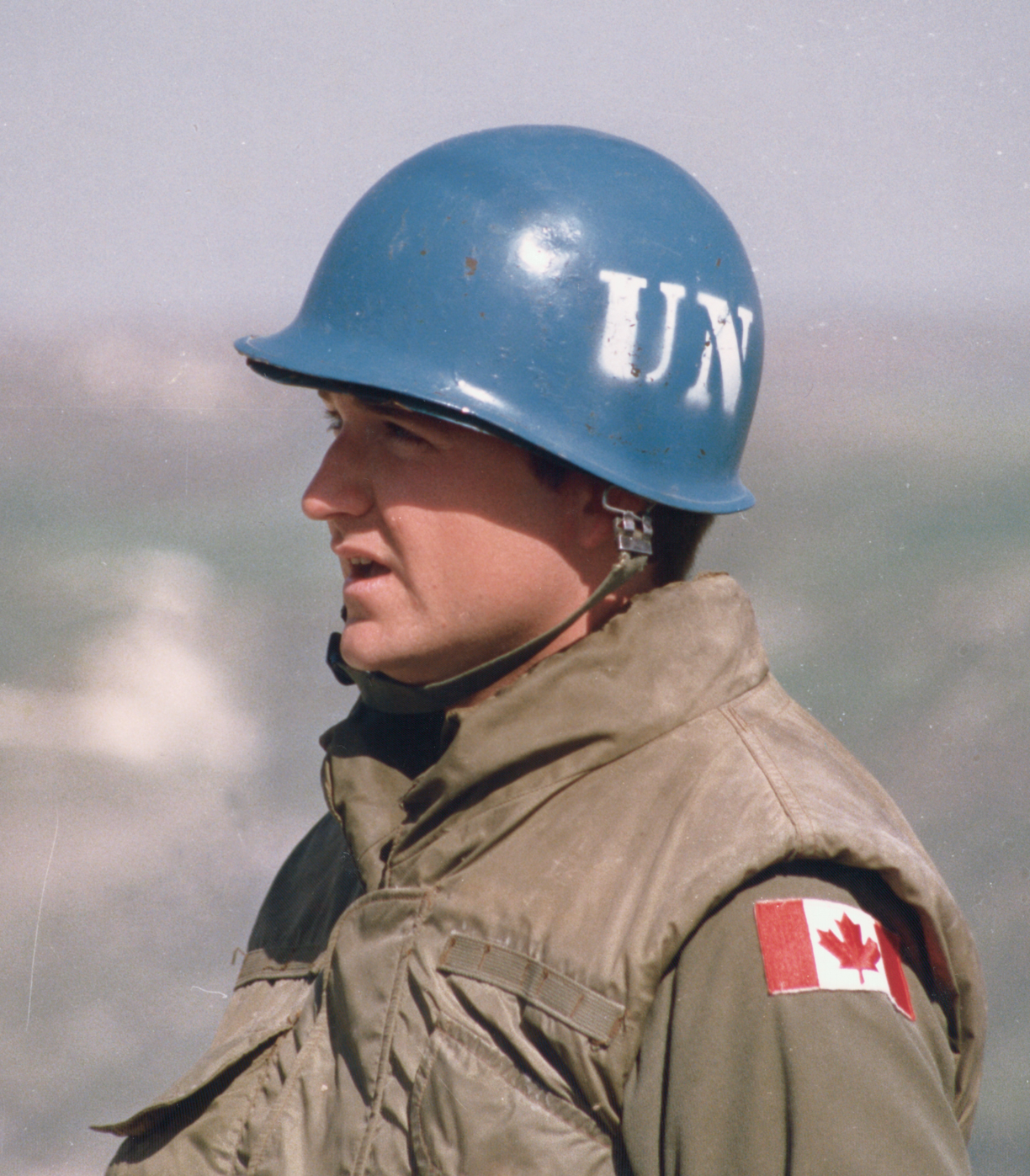
Canadian peacekeeper in 1976 wearing the distinctive UN blue helmet

John Diefenbaker, the Conservative prime minister 1957–63, was reluctant to use Canadian values as a criterion for deciding on foreign policies. For example, Jason Zorbas argues that human rights abuses in Argentina and Brazil did not affect relations with those countries.

However his successor, Lester Pearson, the Liberal prime minister (1963–68), called in 1967 for a foreign policy "based on Canadian considerations, Canadian values and Canadian interests."

Under Conservative Brian Mulroney, Prime Minister 1984–1993, according to scholar Edward Akuffo:

Canadian foreign policy witnessed the integration of development and security issues and the foreign policy agenda when Canada participated in development projects as well as in peacekeeping operations. Mulroney's policy initiatives.. [marked] the critical juncture for the revamping of 'Canada's moral identity' after the Cold War. The concept of Canada's moral identity is consistent with what others call the 'branding of Canada' in the international arena through the projection of Canadian values and culture.

The Canadian public came to identify the nation's peacekeeping role as the country's top contribution in international affairs.

=== Education ===
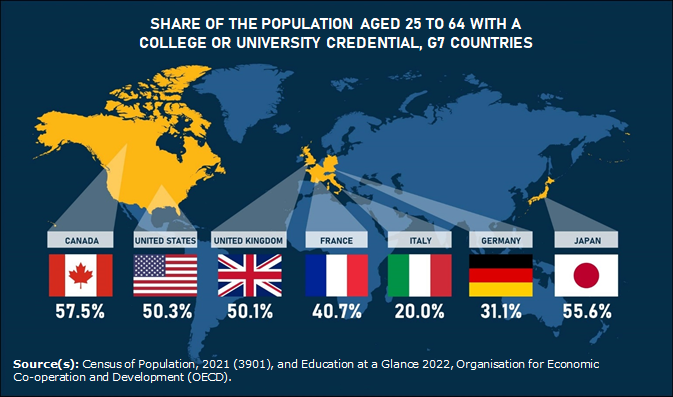
Share of college or university graduates in the G7

Contrasted to the United States, historical educational ideals in Canada have been more elitist, with an emphasis on training church and political elites along British lines. In 1960, for example, 9.2 percent of Canadians aged 20 to 24 were enrolled in higher education, compared to 30.2 percent in the United States. Even at the secondary level, enrollments were higher in the United States. According to surveys in the late 1950s of citizens and educators by Lawrence Downey:

Canadians, as a group, assigned considerably higher priority than did Americans to knowledge, scholarly attitudes, creative skills, aesthetic appreciation, and morality, as outcomes of schooling. Americans emphasized physical development, citizenship, patriotism, social skills, and family living much more than did Canadians.

The United States has long emphasized vocational, technical and professional education, while the Canadian schools resist their inclusion. Ivor F. Goodson and Ian R. Dowbiggin have explored the battle over vocational education in London, Ontario, in the 1900–1930 era, a time when American cities were rapidly expanding their vocational offerings. The London Technical and Commercial High School came under heavy attack from the city's social and business elite, who saw the school as a threat to the budget of the city's only academic high school, London Collegiate Institute.

==== Public universities ====
Most post-secondary institutions in Canada are public universities, which means they are funded by the provincial governments but not owned by the provinces. In contrast, public universities in the United States are owned and controlled by state governments, and there are many private universities, including such schools as Harvard, Yale, Princeton, Chicago and Stanford.

=== Publicly funded health care ===
Universal access to publicly funded health services "is often considered by Canadians as a fundamental value that ensures national health care insurance for everyone wherever they live in the country." Survey research in the 1990s showed that:

When asked, "What makes you most proud of Canada?" one in three Canadians volunteered, "Our health-care system." When asked a reversed version of the American health-care scenario, "Would you support political union [with the U.S.] if it meant a private health-care system?" The reply was a resounding "no."

=== Human rights ===
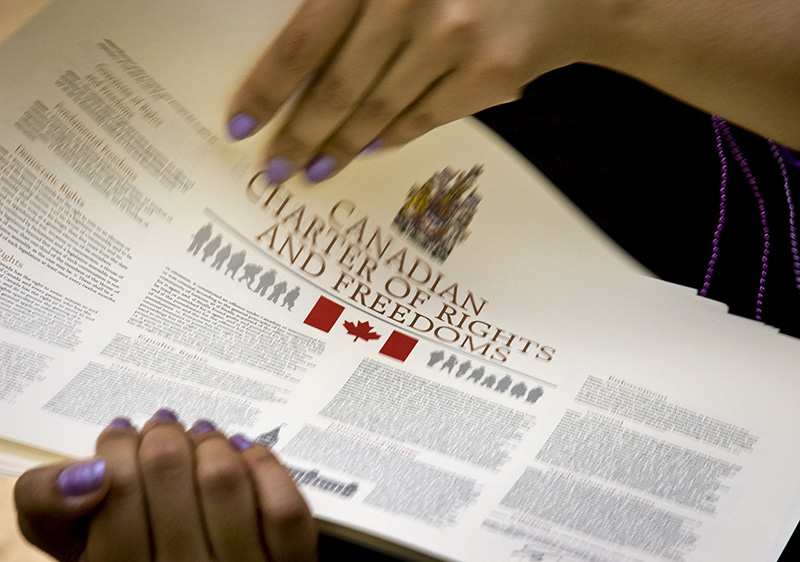
Printed copies of the Canadian Charter of Rights and Freedoms

The Canadian Charter of Rights and Freedoms, heavily promoted by Prime Minister Pierre Trudeau, was adopted in 1982. The Charter guarantees certain political rights to Canadian citizens and civil rights of everyone in Canada from the policies and actions of all areas and levels of the government. It is designed to unify Canadians around a set of principles that embody those rights. Even before he entered politics, Trudeau had developed his concept of the charter primarily as an expression of common Canadian values. Trudeau said that, thanks to the Charter, Canada itself could now be defined:

Canada is a society where all people are equal and where they share some fundamental values based upon freedom. The search for this Canadian identity, as much as my philosophical views, had led me to insist on the charter.

Pierre Trudeau himself later wrote in his Memoirs (1993) that "Canada itself" could now be defined as a "society where all people are equal and where they share some fundamental values based upon freedom", and that all Canadians could identify with the values of liberty and equality.

==== Multiculturalism ====
The enormous ethnic variety of the population of Canada in recent decades has led to an emphasis on "multiculturalism." Sociologist N. M. Sussman says, "The tenets of this concept permitted and subtly encouraged the private maintenance of ethnic values while simultaneously insisting on minimal public adherence to Canadian behaviors and to Canadian values." As result, immigrants to Canada are more likely to maintain participatory role by holding to values and attitudes of both the home and of the host culture, compared to substantive roles immigrants of Australia, the United Kingdom, or the United States are able to engage.

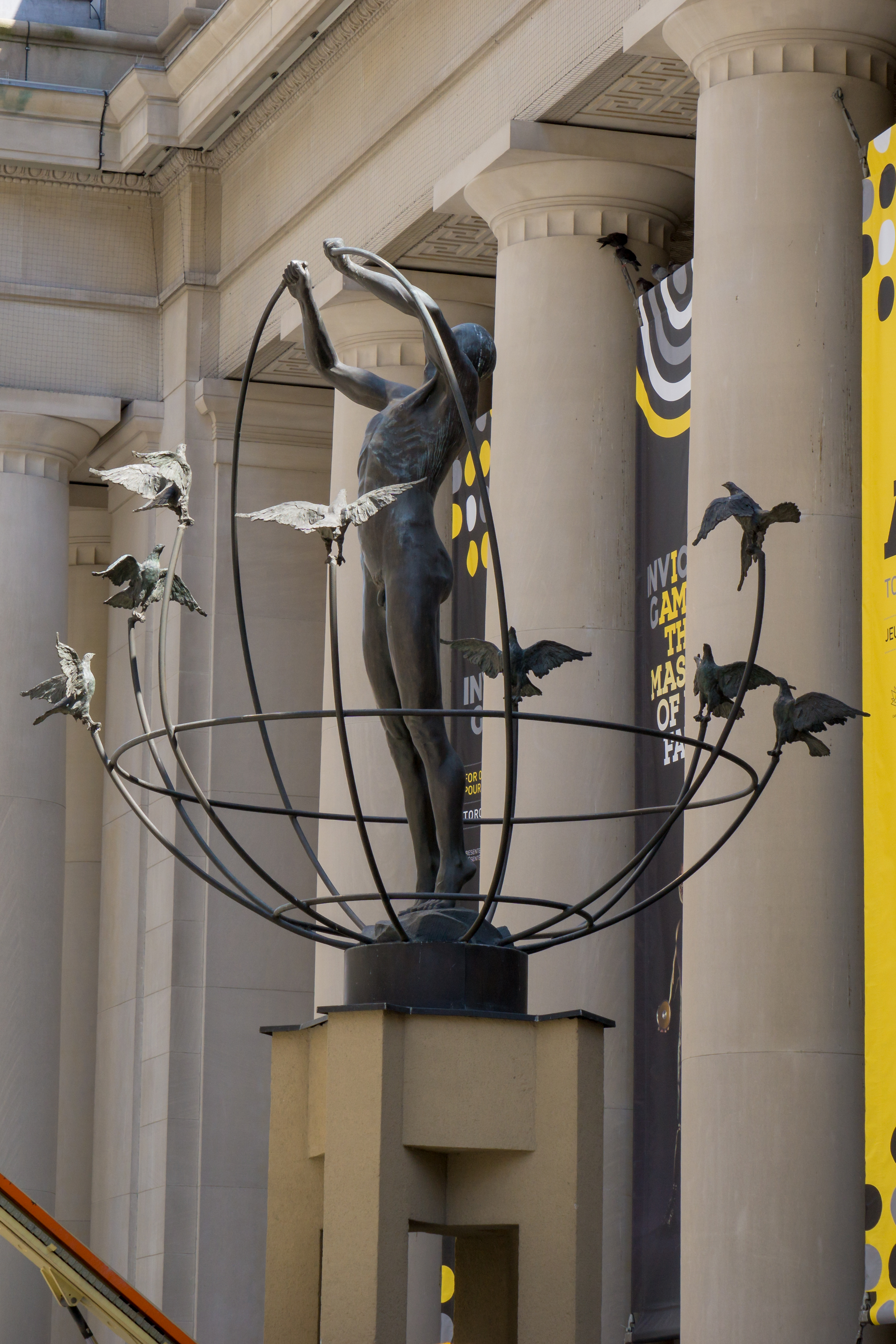
Monument to Multiculturalism by Francesco Pirelli, in Toronto

Andrew Griffith argues that even though Canada has a history as a white settler colony, he points out that "89 percent of Canadians believe that foreign-born Canadians are just as likely to be good citizens as those born in Canada." This perspective emerged because there was a need for labor from culturally similar sources, but this demand wasn't being met. Canadians today generally view multiculturalism as an integrative force in the country, with the expectation that newcomers will embrace Canadian values and attitudes. Griffith adds that "There are virtually no differences between Canadian-born and foreign-born individuals when it comes to their agreement to abide by Canadian values (70 and 68 percent, respectively)."

In the years following the Second World War, during Canada's early phases of immigration, multiculturalism was not seen as a desirable value. People who were foreign-born and racially different were discouraged from settling in Canada permanently. However, women from England and Scotland faced fewer restrictions, as they were considered 'good stock' who could potentially marry white Canadian men. In a 1947 speech, Liberal prime minister Mackenzie King strongly advocated for restrictions on immigration from Asian countries in order to preserve the characteristics of the population and prevent interracial marriages. In 1953, this advocacy led to an immigration law, introduced by the Liberal party, that discriminated against people from culturally dissimilar backgrounds. This racially discriminatory law ranked people from different parts of the world hierarchically, reflecting the legacy of settler-colonization in the country.

This law underwent significant changes in 1962 under Conservative prime minister John Diefenbaker, shifting its focus to economic interests and introducing universal criteria for admission. In 1966, Lester B. Pearson's Liberal government further emphasized these changes through the White Paper on Immigration, which included an anti-discrimination clause onto the immigration law. The new immigration act, aligned with this new direction, came into effect in 1976. However, in 1987, the now-disbanded Reform Party of Canada attempted to revive Prime Minister King's perspective of maintaining the ethnic makeup of the country. The 1993 federal election saw a lack of consensus regarding multiculturalism policy and its symbolism, which continues into the contemporary decade with the enduring popular assumption that 'real' Canadians are white and originally of European descent.

The official state policy of multiculturalism is often cited as one of Canada's significant accomplishments and a key distinguishing element of Canadian identity.

==== Gender equality and the role of women ====
Citing Canadian values, Canadian courts have rejected assertions that violence against women is in some circumstances acceptable because of one's religious and cultural beliefs. In the R v. Humaid decision, Justice Rutherford of the Ontario Superior Court of Justice stated:

Wife-murder may seem especially repugnant to our Canadian value fabric when cultural considerations that are contrary to our Canadian values figure prominently. However it must be borne in mind here that the Court of Appeal found "no air of reality" to the applicant's claim that religious and cultural beliefs resulted in his being severely provoked by what his wife said to him.

=== Egalitarianism, social equality, and peace ===
While Liberal and Conservative politicians claimed to represent Canadian values, so too did socialists and forces on the left. Ian MacKay argues that, thanks to the long-term political impact of "Rebels, Reds, and Radicals", and allied leftist political elements, "egalitarianism, social equality, and peace... are now often simply referred to... as 'Canadian values.'"

== International comparisons ==
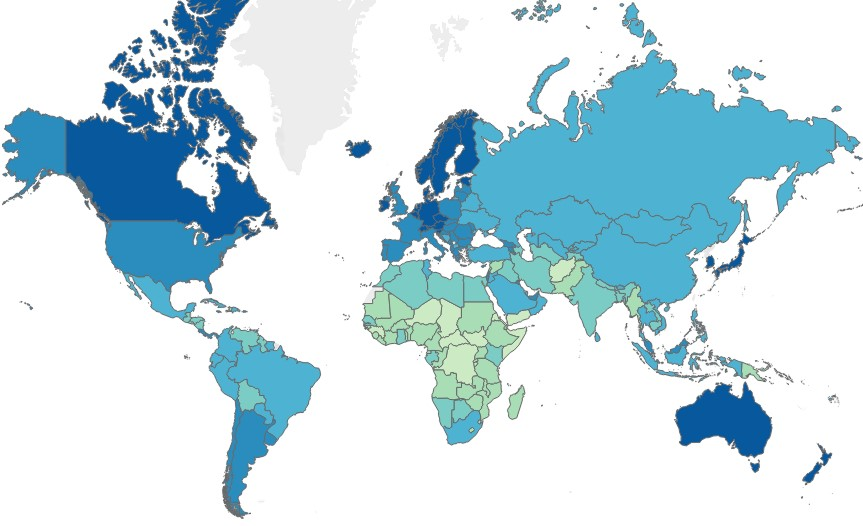
2022 Social Progress Index

When he began his study of Canada in the late 1940s, American sociologist Seymour Martin Lipset assumed Canadian and American values were practically identical. Further work led him to discover and to explore the differences. By 1968 he concluded:

Canadian values fall somewhere between those of Britain and the United States, rather than being almost identical with those of the United States, as I had assumed.

Lipset offered some theories of where the two societies differ, and why. That stimulated a large body of scholarship, with other scholars offering their own explanations and criticizing his. As a result, numerous academic studies compare Canadian values and beliefs with those of the United States, and sometimes they add in other countries as well. Lipset has explained his social science methodology:

my conclusions [are] that the variations in North American history and social and geographic environments gave rise to two peoples who differ in significant ways from each other, although as I have repeatedly stressed, they are more similar than different, particularly in comparison with other nations. My chief methodological argument for focusing on Canada in order to learn about the United States is precisely that the two nations have so much in common. Focusing on small differences between countries which are alike can be more fruitful for understanding cultural effects than on large ones among highly similar nations. The former permits holding constant many variables, which the units have in common.

Lipset presented numerous political and economic values on which he scored the U.S. as high and Canada as low. These included: individualism and competitiveness, entrepreneurship and high risk-taking, Utopian moralism, inclination to political crusades, populist or anti-establishment and anti-elite tendencies, a God-and-country nationalism, and intolerance for ideological nonconformity.

=== Historical origins: Revolution and counterrevolution ===
Lipset argues that:

Many writers seeking to account for value differences between the United States and Canada suggest that they stem in large part from the revolutionary origins of the United States and the counterrevolutionary history of Canada…. The Loyalist emigrés from the American Revolution and Canada's subsequent repeatedly aroused fears of United States encroachment fostered the institutionalization of a counterrevolutionary or conservative ethos.

Canadian historian Arthur R. M. Lower argues:

In its new wilderness home and its new aspect of British North Americanism, colonial Toryism made its second attempt to erect on American soil a copy of the English social edifice. From one point of view this is the most significant thing about the Loyalist movement; it withdrew a class concept of life from the south, moved it up north, and gave it a second chance.

Jean Chrétien in his 2010 book “My Years as Prime Minister” stated that Canada is fundamentally western and liberal, and the values of nation as "moderation, sharing, tolerance and compassion.” During his tenure as prime minister, real GDP per capita growth was more than twice that of the period between 1980 and 1996. Canada was the number one country in terms of living standard growth among the G7 nations during that time.

Justin Trudeau after taking office as prime minister in 2015 tried to define what it means to be Canadian, saying that Canada lacks a core identity but does have shared values:

There is no core identity, no mainstream in Canada.... There are shared values—openness, respect, compassion, willingness to work hard, to be there for each other, to search for equality and justice. Those qualities are what make us the first post-national state.

Some critics observe that Trudeau's list of values are an evolving one as political circumstances arise, and the idea of post-nationalism by stripping Canada's European History is a pavement to tribalism and race based politics to cement stakeholder groups and appeal to them during elections.

=== Religious factors ===
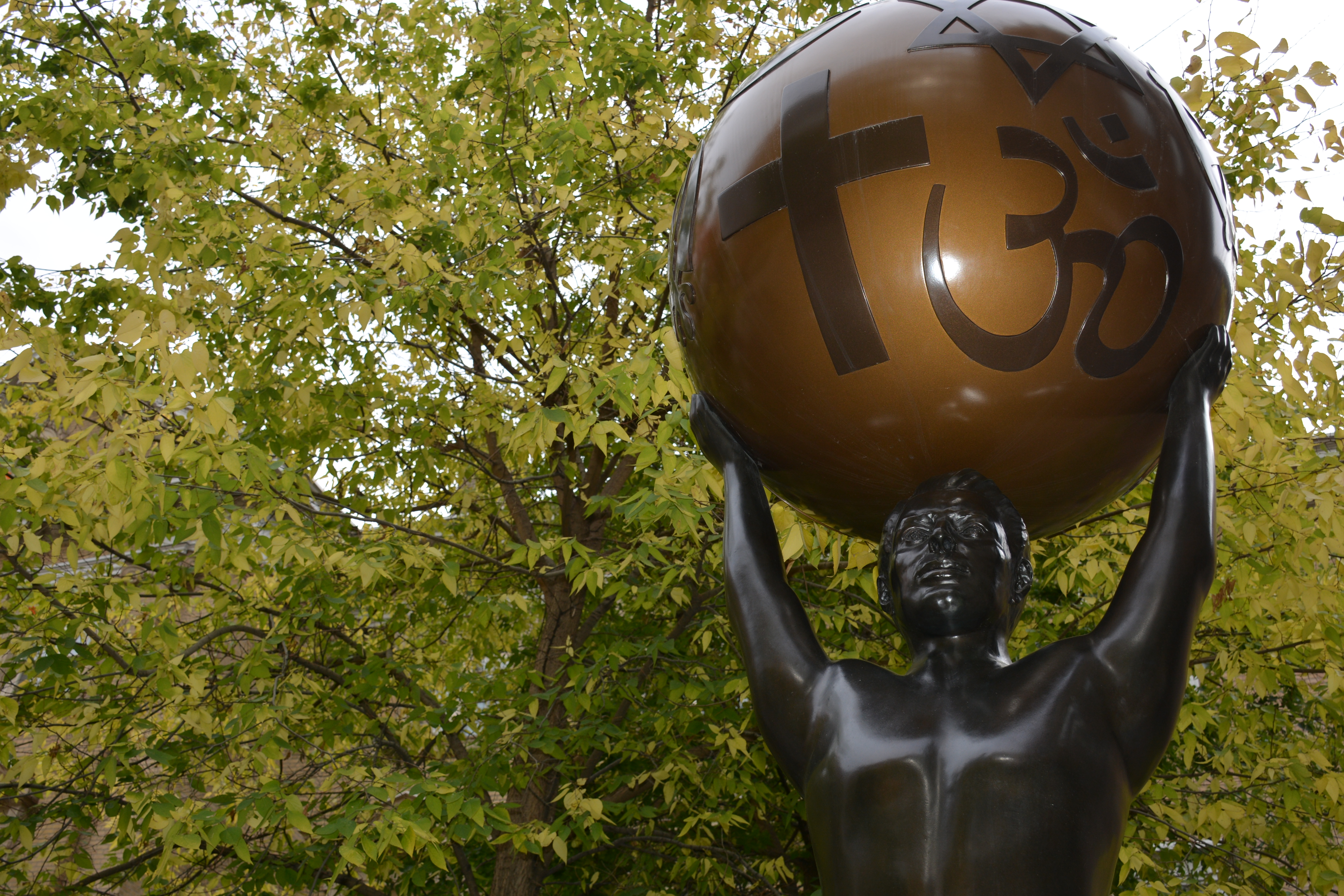
Freedom of religion sculpture by Marlene Hilton Moore at the McMurtry Gardens of Justice in Toronto

Religious belief and behaviour are possible candidates in searching for the sources of values. Lipset looked to religion as one of the causes of differing values. He stated:

America remains under the strong influence of the Protestant sects. Its northern neighbor adheres to two churches, Catholic and Anglican, and an ecumenical Protestant denomination (the United Church of Canada) that has moved far from the sectarian origins of its component units toward church-like communitarian values. The overwhelming majority of Canadians (eighty-seven percent) belong to these three mainline denominations. Conservative evangelicals--groups of Baptists, Nazarenes, Pentecostals, Adventists, and so on--constitute only seven percent of Canadians....Clearly, the different religious traditions of the two countries help to explain much of their varying secular behavior and belief.

Hoover and Reimer agree and update Lipset with a plethora of recent survey statistics, while noting that the differences narrowed since 1990, especially in the Prairie provinces. They stress that in the early 21st century 87% of Canadians belonged to cooperative churches, whereas 20% of Americans were Baptists and many more were evangelicals, fundamentalists or members of new religions who tended to behave in a more sectarian fashion; these elements, they argue, made for a higher level of religious and political conservatism and intolerance in the U.S.

=== Regionalism ===
Baer, Grabb and Johnston argue that:

The pattern of regional cultures is not significantly affected or defined by the national border separating Canada and the United States. Instead...with a few exceptions, the map of regional cultures involves three major segments: a relatively left-liberal Quebec, a more conservative Southern United States, and a comparatively moderate sector that largely encompasses the remainder of the two countries.

== Invocation ==
=== Memorials ===
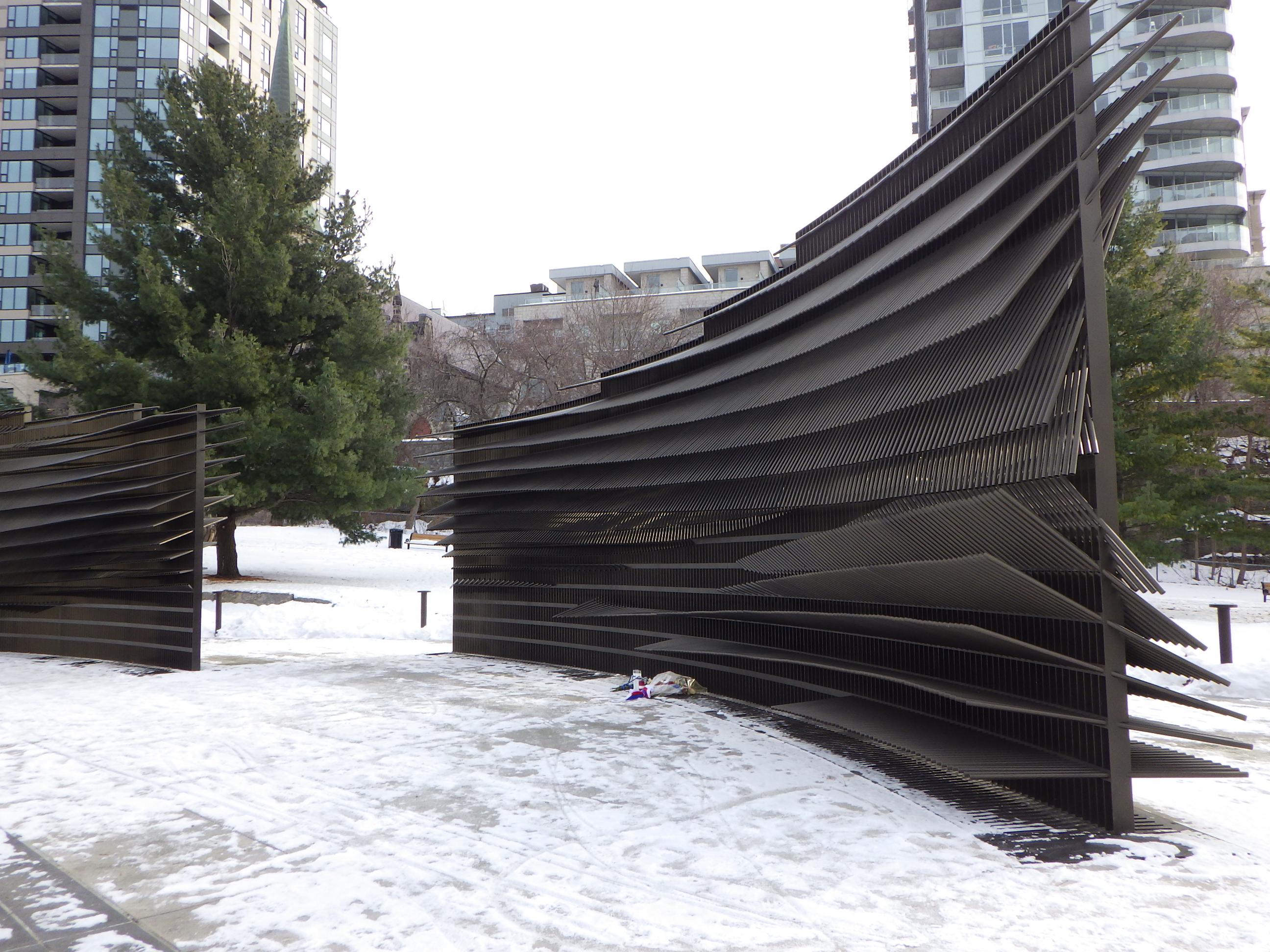
The Memorial to the Victims of Communism in Ottawa, Ontario

The idea of Canadian values has been used for the dedication of memorials, like the Memorial to the Victims of Communism: Canada, a Land of Refuge, in Ottawa. Its construction was meant to bring the suffering of "the millions of victims of Communism" into the public's consciousness. Many of these victims fled to Canada "seeking peace, order, democracy, and liberty." The memorial is expected to be completed in 2018.

According to Ms. Mélanie Joly, the Minister of Canadian Heritage, "Commemorative monuments play a key role in reflecting the character, identity, history and values of Canadians". She complained that the previous Harper government had made the project too controversial. Her new Liberal government has moved the site and cut its budget.

== Quebec ==
=== Charter of the French Language ===
The Charter of the French Language (French: La charte de la langue française, also known as loi 101 [Bill 101]) is legislation that makes French the official language of Quebec. Among other things, the Charter requires:

- all administrative government documents to be drafted and published in French
- the language of instruction from kindergarten to secondary school to be French

=== Quebec Charter of Values ===
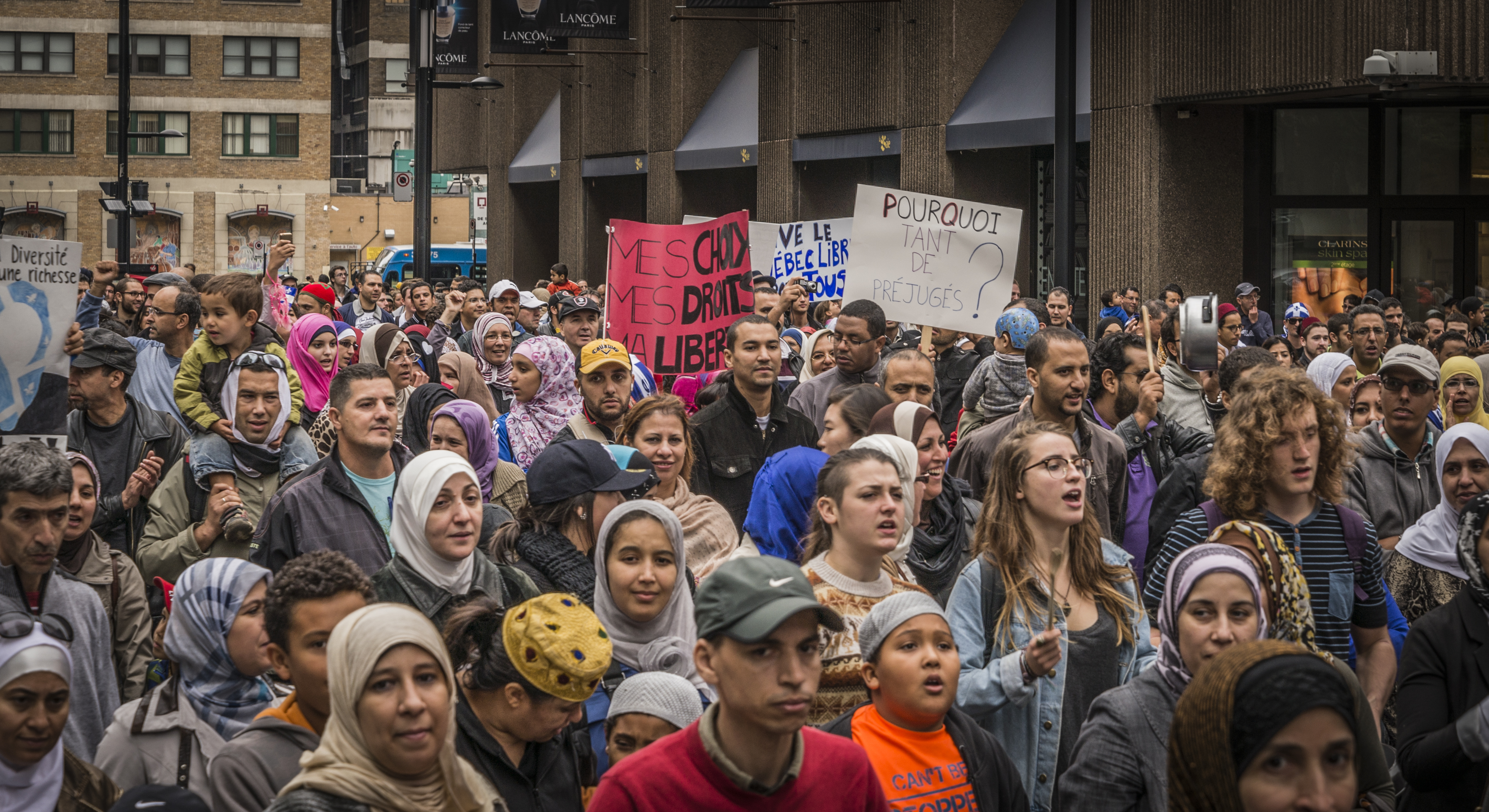
Quebec Charter of Values protest, September 14, 2013 in Montreal

The Charter of Values (French: Charte de la laïcité or Charte des valeurs québécoises, also known as Bill 60) was proposed legislation tabled by the governing Parti Québecois in August 2013 but which the National Assembly of Quebec did not pass by its dissolution in March 2014. It would have banned public sector employees from wearing conspicuous religious symbols. Article 5 in Chapter II stated:

In the exercise of their functions, personnel members of public bodies must not wear objects such as headgear, clothing, jewellery or other adornments which, by their conspicuous nature, overtly indicate a religious affiliation.

Justin Trudeau, who has been a champion of the Canadian Charter of Rights and Freedoms (French: La Charte canadienne des droits et libertés), opposed the proposed Quebec Charter of Values. He stated, "Prohibiting someone from wearing a hijab or a kippah is not compatible with Quebec and Canadian values."

=== Distinct society ===
Proposed changes to the Canadian Constitution included adding the phrase "distinct society" to the Constitution Act, 1867, to recognize the uniqueness of Quebec as compared with the rest of Canada.

== Controversy ==
Defining Canadian values is problematic if the goal is to identify values that are universally held. According to Canadian Broadcasting Corporation reporter Neil Macdonald, there are "precious few notions that can accurately be described as universally held Canadian values." According to journalist Lysiane Gagnon, Canadians "don't share common values." She notes that, while many ideas—such as medicare, bilingualism, and multiculturalism—are sometimes characterized as Canadian values, "many Canadians are against all or some of these." Canadian sociologist Vic Satzewich has argued that "coming up with a universal set of our nation's values would be impossible."

The Institute for Canadian Values sponsored advertisements against the teaching of certain sexual education topics in the Ontario school curriculum and discriminated against transsexual, transgender, and intersex persons. The advertisements were controversial and quickly discontinued.

=== Barbaric cultural practices issue ===
Certain cultural practices were called "Barbaric" and made illegal in 2015, when the Zero Tolerance for Barbaric Cultural Practices Act was enacted by the Canadian federal government. The Act criminalizes certain conduct related to early and forced marriage ceremonies, as well as removing a child from Canada for the purpose of such marriages.

In the 2015 general election Conservatives had pitched their policy "as an issue of Canadian values.... The Conservatives expanded the issue, announcing a proposed RCMP hotline that would allow Canadians to report the existence of 'barbaric cultural practices' in the country." These targeted practices included polygamy, forced marriage and early marriage (i.e. child marriage).

=== Nationalism and its potential adverse impact on foreign policy ===
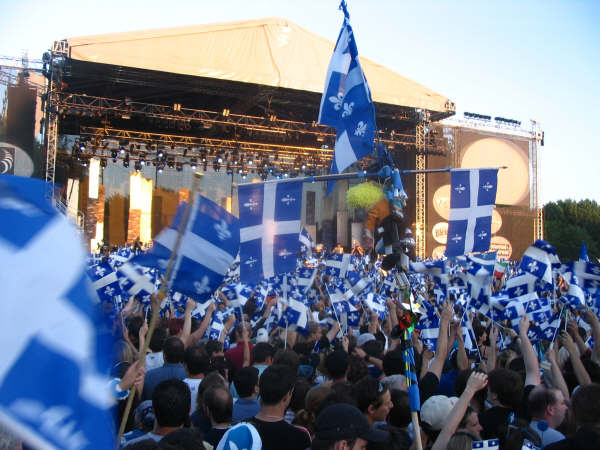
Fête Nationale du Québec (or Saint-Jean-Baptiste Day) celebrated here in June 2006

Scholars have asked whether shared values underpin national identity. Denis Stairs links the concept of Canadian values with nationalism. Stairs, the McCulloch Professor in Political Science at Dalhousie University, has argued that there is indeed an intense widespread belief in the existence of Canadian values, but says that belief can itself be harmful. He contends that:

[Canadians typically] think of themselves not as others are, but as morally superior. They believe, in particular, that they subscribe to a distinctive set of values—Canadian values—and that those values are special in the sense of being unusually virtuous. A prominent effect of that belief is that it has put them in serious danger of misunderstanding the true origins of their behaviour, on the one hand, and of doing significant damage to the effectiveness of their diplomacy, both next door and overseas, on the other.

Stairs also argues that, "first billing is usually given in received lists of Canadian values to 'multiculturalism'... as a means of challenging the premises of nationalism in Quebec."

=== Screening immigrants for anti-Canadian values ===
Canadian politicians have proposed rejecting immigrants who have anti-Canadian values such as:

- intolerance toward other religions, cultures, genders, and sexual orientations
- reluctance to embrace Canadian freedoms

Kellie Leitch, a candidate for leadership candidate for the Conservative Party of Canada's 2017 Convention, was a vocal proponent of such government screening.

In 2016, an Environics public opinion poll found that 54 per cent of Canadians agree that "there are too many immigrants coming into this country who are not adopting Canadian values."

== Contemporary issues ==
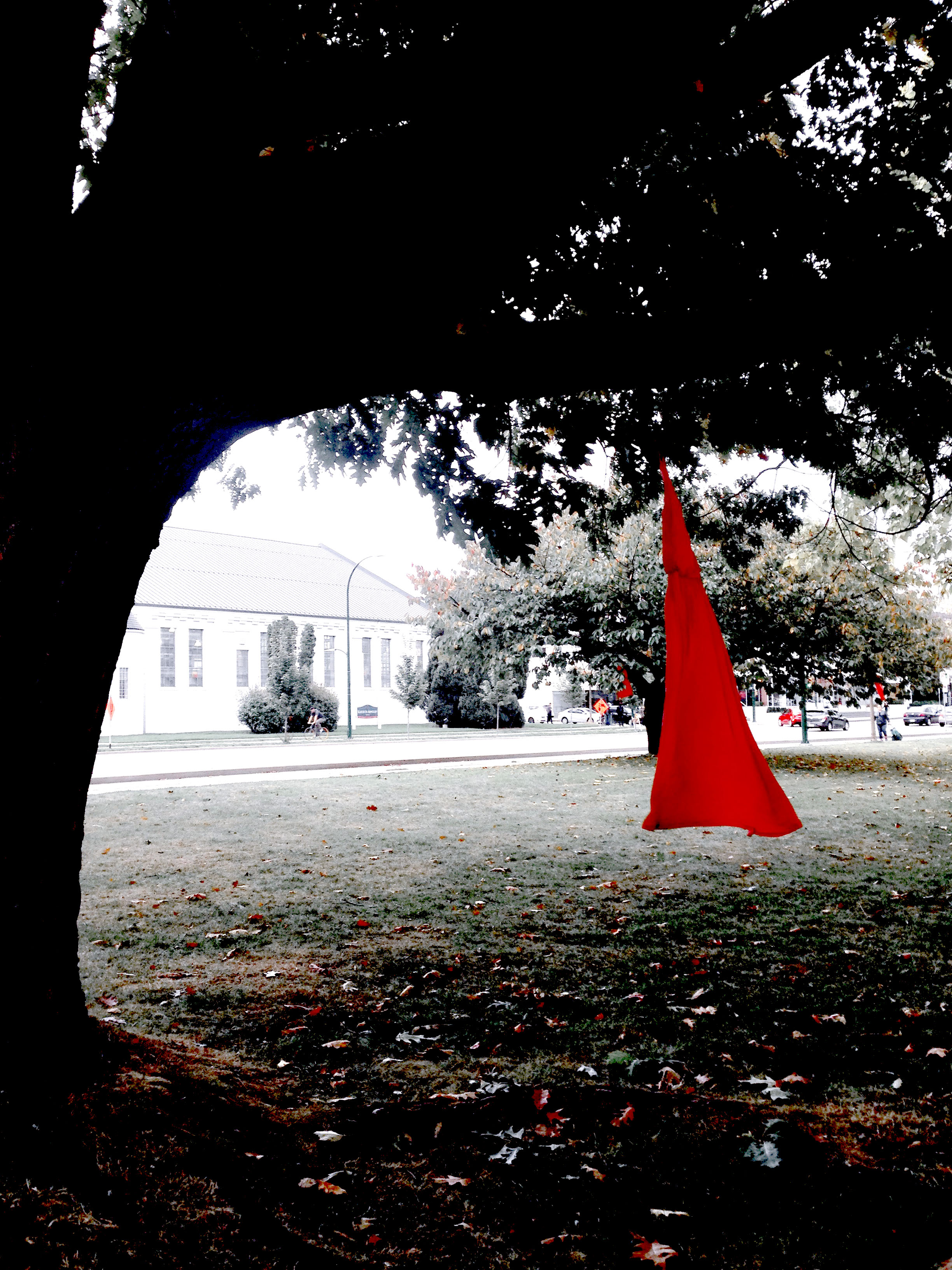
Art installation inspired by The REDress Project on National Day for Vigils for MMIW (2016)

Indigenous women and girls in Canada are at high risk of kidnapping and murder, prompting a National Inquiry from 2016 to 2019 that described the situation as a "race, identity and gender-based genocide. " Many First Nation communities in Canada face ongoing drinking water advisories. Safe drinking water is recognized as a human right in international treaties ratified by Canada. This issue has drawn criticism from human rights organizations, including the United Nations.

In Canada, individuals with disabilities face both historical and current discrimination, resulting in lower education, higher unemployment, and inadequate income. Canada leds the world in refugee resettlement, but faces criticism for mistreatment in immigration detention centers, including abuse and lack of medical care, along with challenges for asylum seekers in obtaining legal support and facing long claim processing times. Police use of excessive force, especially against marginalized groups, remains a concern.

In Quebec, Bill 101 promotes French while limiting English has been criticized by the United Nations for civil rights violations. Bill 21, enacted in 2019, bans religious symbols for public employees, raising human rights issues, particularly for Muslim women.

== See also ==
- Etiquette in North America
- Just society
- Social programs in Canada
