= Dowbiggin =

Dowbiggin is a surname derived from the historic locality of Dowbiggin in Sedbergh, England.

Notable people with the surname Dowbiggin include:

- Bruce Dowbiggin, Canadian author and sports broadcaster
- Herbert Dowbiggin, the eighth British colonial Inspector General of Police of Ceylon
- Ian Dowbiggin (born 1952), Canadian historian
- Lancelot Dowbiggin (1685–1759), English architect
- Rebecca Dowbiggin (born 1983), British rower
