= Canada Christian College =

Private Bible college in Whitby, Ontario, Canada

Canada Christian College and School of Graduate Theological Studies
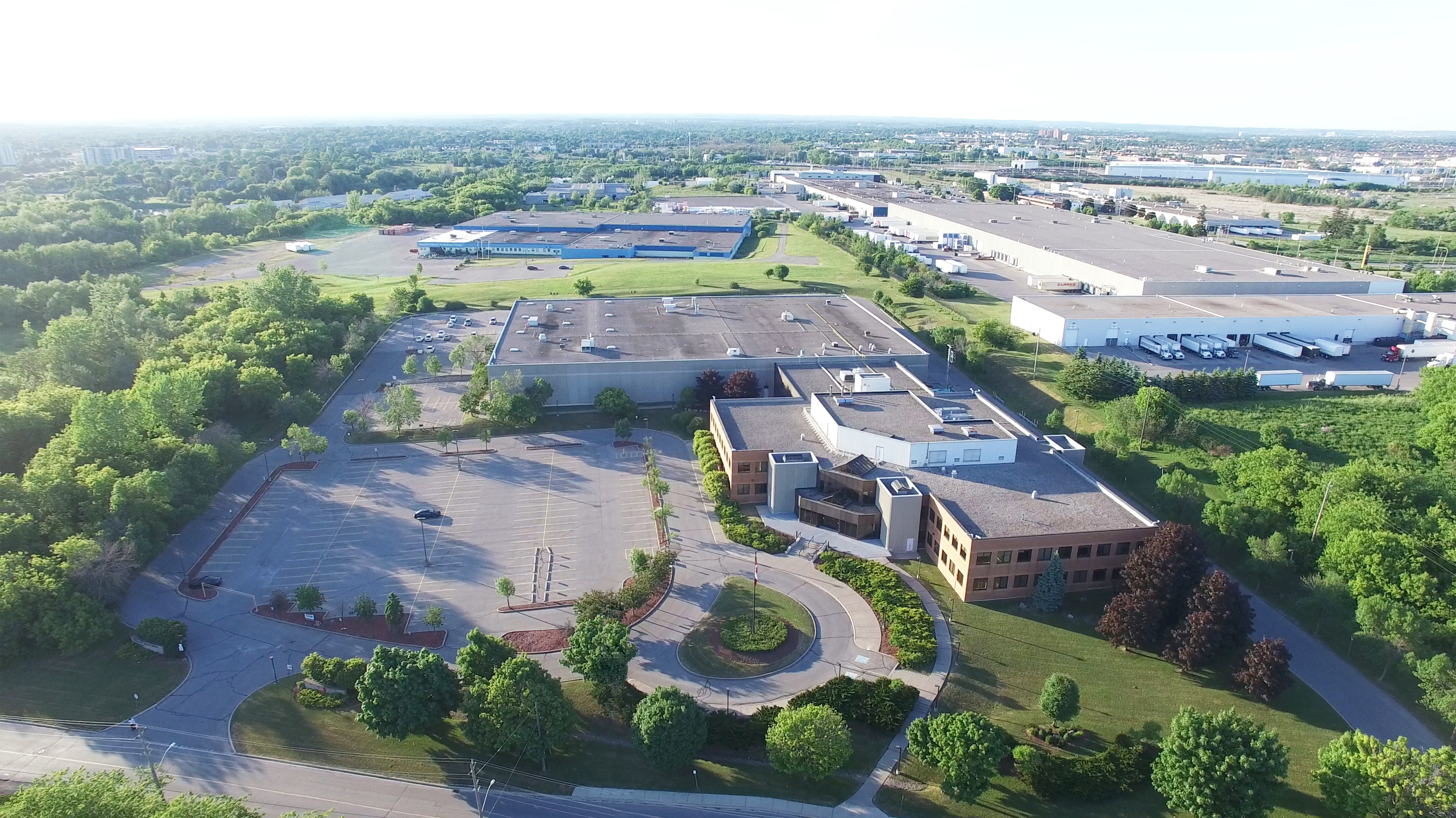
- Type: Bible college
- Established: 1967; 59 years ago (as Richmond College), 1974; 52 years ago (as Canada Christian College)
- Founder: Elmer S. McVety
- Affiliations: The Evangelical Association, Canadian College of Christian Counsellors
- Religious affiliation: Evangelical Christian
- President: Charles McVety (since 1993)
- Faculty: 70
- Location: 300 Water Street, Whitby, Ontario, Canada; 43°51′10″N 78°55′29″W
- Campus: Suburban
- Language: English
- Colours: Red and black
- Website: canadachristiancollege.com

Canada Christian College and School of Graduate Theological Studies, also known as Canada Christian College, is a private, degree-granting evangelical Bible college in Whitby, Ontario, Canada that was founded in 1967. The College is recognized by the Ministry of Colleges and Universities in Ontario to grant fourteen degrees and is listed as a Designated Learning Institute. As of 2025, over 7,500 people have graduated from Canada Christian College.

== History ==
Canada Christian College traces its origins to Richmond College, which was founded in September 1967 as a Christian liberal arts college by Elmer McVety (1928–1993), Canadian evangelist John Wesley White (1928–2016) who served as chancellor, and his brother, Hugh White, who served as the first dean. The college, which expected to have 100 students in its first year, was originally located on a 7-acre site at Lake Shore Boulevard and Dixie Road leased from the federal government that was formerly a Canadian Army arsenal. Its degree-granting powers were based on a letters patent from Manitoba rather than a provincial charter from Ontario. McVety was "removed from the board" of Richmond College in June 1969 following a dispute but remained chairman of the Association for Education and Evangelism, the organization he founded in Manitoba in 1963 under which the college issued its degrees. (The Association for Education and Evangelism became the Canadian Non-Denominational Association for Education and Evangelism in 1980 and is known today as the Evangelical Association). In 1974, the association launched a theological school named Canada Christian College, with classes being held at space rented from McMaster University in Hamilton until 1980, while Richmond College continued to offer arts programs at its campus at Leslie Street and Steeles Avenue. In 1981, when Richmond College closed, custody of student records was assigned to Trinity Western University in Langley, British Columbia.

Classroom space was rented from McMaster University in Hamilton from 1974 until 1980. Beginning in 1979, Canada Christian College also rented classroom space in the Ontario Institute for Studies in Education (OISE) building at 252 Bloor Street West, near the University of Toronto campus, as well as classroom and office space in Newtonbrook Plaza at 5799 Yonge Street in Willowdale. In June 1985, Canada Christian College acquired space at 455 Huron Street in Toronto. In 1991, it relocated to a 50,000 square foot facility at 245 Dalesford Road in Etobicoke. In the summer of 1995, the college purchased and moved to a 110,000 square foot campus at 50 Gervais Drive in Don Mills. In 2018, Canada Christian College acquired and renovated a new lakefront campus in Whitby, Ontario with an approximately 200,000 square foot building, 600 feet of lakefront and 12 acres of land with a projected value of $43.8 million.

In 1982, the right of the Canada Christian College to grant degrees was revoked by the Ministry of Colleges and Universities. The revocation followed allegations from provincial officials that BA and MA degrees offered by Canada Christian College were "misleading" because they implied a general arts education. They also alleged they were "useless" for further study or teaching jobs in recognized universities and that the religious studies degrees were similarly suspect as the school was not accredited by any recognized religious educational body. At the time, the school had 300 students. According to Elmer McVety, most of the college's courses were prepared by the Christian International University in Phoenix, Arizona, an unaccredited institution whose programs were considered "academically substandard" by the state of Texas.

Elmer McVety died in 1993 and his son, Charles McVety, took over leadership of the college.

After having its Ontario degree granting authority revoked, Canada Christian College was able to continue issuing theological degrees under the authority of its Manitoba letters patent. However, in 1991 an official at the Ministry of Colleges and Universities stated that the Canada Christian College's granting of degrees appeared to contravene the Degree Granting Act of 1983. Minister of Colleges and Universities Richard Allen agreed that the college was not authorized to grant degrees and pledged the college would be made to comply with the law and only grant diplomas and certificates. In 1998, the ministry ordered the school to close. That year, Progressive Conservative MPP Jim Brown introduced a private member's bill which sought to grant the institution degree-granting authority in Ontario; the bill died on the order paper without being voted upon. The next year, in 1999, Progressive Conservative MPP Frank Klees introduced a successful private member's bill (Bill PR-4) securing degree-granting authority for the college in Ontario.

The college is currently an accredited private degree-granting institution listed by the Ontario Ministry of Colleges and Universities and is permitted only to grant degrees "in the field of religious studies and research in higher Christian learning."

=== Overview ===
The college is recognized by the Ontario Ministry of Colleges and Universities to grant fourteen degrees and is listed as a Designated Learning Institute. As of 2025, the college reports that more than 7,500 people have graduated from Canada Christian College.

== Proposal for and rejection of university status ==
The Ontario legislature voted and passed legislation Bill 213 to change Canada Christian College’s name to Canada University and add Bachelor of Arts and Bachelor of Science to its already existing list of degrees. Bill 213 received royal assent on December 8th, 2020; however, political opposition caused the Minister of Colleges and Universities to withhold proclamation “at this time.”

Former Premier of Ontario Kathleen Wynne criticized the proposal, asking, in reference to college president Charles McVety, "Why (would) this government...extend the mandate of the most publicly and vocally homophobic man in Ontario?". Additionally, the Ontario Confederation of University Faculty Associations stated in a letter to Premier Ford that they are "alarmed that your government is intending to discreetly pass legislation that would allow the Canada Christian College to call itself a "university" and award degrees," adding that "The Ontario government should not grant accreditation and degree-granting privileges to institutions that do not meet the anti-discriminatory and anti-hate speech principles outlined in the Ontario Human Rights Code,"

McVety responded to these objections, saying that "the college, its president, staff, and faculty value all individuals, including the LGBTQ community."

Ford was accused of giving McVety a quid pro quo and granting the Canada Christian College university status as a reward for McVety's past political support of Ford's leadership campaign as well as of his Progressive Conservative government. Opposition Leader Andrea Horwath alleged "a backroom deal" between Ford and McVety.

Responding to these accusations, McVety stated that "this Ontario legislation is based upon fairness, not favouritism. It is an initiative that does nothing more than correct a systemic problem plaguing some long-standing degree-granting institutions that are called colleges, and not universities." He further said that "it is sad that the NDP and MPP Kathleen Wynne would recklessly damage the lives of hundreds of students and thousands of graduates with mindless, hateful name calling, all while reading directly from a disreputable source, Wikipedia."

The Ontario government was also criticized for introducing the bill without the Postsecondary Education Quality Assessment Board (PEQAB) having completed review of the college's request to create new Bachelor of Arts and Bachelor of Science degree programs or its request to change its name to the Canada University and School of Graduate Theological Studies. Liberal leader Steven Del Duca said "it certainly looks suspicious, which is troubling" that the government would introduce enabling legislation before the college has even been approved by the PEQAB.

Speaking about the proposed name change, McVety stated that "It is unconscionable for students, the majority of whom are visible minorities or new Canadians, to have their hard-earned Bachelor, Master and Doctoral degrees marginalized due to outdated naming practices."

Private financial information submitted to the PEQAB as part of the college's application for university status revealed that Charles McVety and his son, Ryan, were given six-figure loans from the college's charitable funds—owing $860,000 by the end of 2019—and that these funds were allegedly used to buy jet skis and vehicles—leading to questions being asked in the Ontario Legislative Assembly as well as a lengthy report in the Toronto Star as to how the college's charitable funds were being used.

The college responded to these allegations, stating, "The college, in its application, gave financial information under the promised terms that it would remain confidential. Any such information was improperly posted...The college will provide answers concerning its financial statements to an appropriate authority when requested."

On October 27, 2020, the Legislative Assembly of Ontario passed a motion to "condemn the extreme and hateful invective of Charles McVety and oppose any efforts to make Canada Christian College into an accredited university."

On December 8, 2020, Bill 213, an omnibus bill which included enabling legislation which would have granted additional degree granting status and use of the term university, was passed by the provincial legislature. However, the portion of the bill relating to Canada Christian College was not proclaimed, pending a decision by the PEQAB on the college's application for university status.

A spokesperson for Minister of Colleges and Universities Ross Romano announced on May 21, 2021, that the "PEQAB has recommended that the institution not be granted expanded degree-granting authority or a name change at this time" and that "The minister has reviewed and accepts their recommendation." Accordingly, Romano's spokesperson stated that "the government will not be proclaiming Schedule 2 of Bill 213 at this time."

In response to the decision by Romano, McVety stated that it is the students at Canada Christian College who will suffer because of the "political corruptness" of the university proposal process. He further stated that "PEQAB put forward to the ministry a fraudulent misrepresentation of the college. The government was informed of the misrepresentations but refused to investigate...Our students and campus community deserved better from their government." Canada Christian College filed a lawsuit against PEQAB in 2022, which was dismissed, as was Canada Christian College's subsequent appeal.

== Campus ==
Canada Christian College has a 12-acre campus located in the Greater Toronto Area at 300 Water St. in Whitby, ON. The property has 650 ft. of lakefront on the shore of Lake Ontario. It has 200,000 sqft of academic space.

Classrooms

It has 33-classrooms that can seat up to 1,000 students.

Canada Athletic Performance Centre

The indoor 6v6 soccer field has MLS level turf. Its two basketball courts have NBA-style floating hardwood floors designed to FIBA specifications. There is also a large fitness and weight training gym area.

Canada Event Centre

The campus includes a 3,500 seat event centre outfitted with production equipment, including over 100 moving lights.

The River Worship

After the COVID-19 pandemic, the College launched a Tuesday night worship service in the Canada Event Centre. The River quickly grew to attract 2,000-3,000 people every week. As of Fall 2025, over 75,000 people have participated in The River and over 16,000 people have committed their lives to Christ.

== Academic programs ==
Canada Christian College houses five primary degree-granting departments: Ministry, Sacred Music, Christian Counseling, Business, and Religious Education. Across these departments, the college offers 14 Bachelor, Master and Doctoral degrees as well as 4 one-year certificates (Worship Leadership, Bible, Christian Counseling and The River Diploma). These departments operate under the authority of the Canada Christian College Act, 1999.

The College of Registered Psychotherapists of Ontario (CRPO) has credentialed many of CCC’s graduates; however, some graduates have been rejected. In 2016, a CRPO panel ruled against recognizing Canada Christian College academic transcripts stating that it "was concerned about the discrepancies that appeared in both the bachelor's and master's degrees transcripts from Canada Christian College and stated that transcripts are designed to be sources of accurate and reflective information about a student's performance and progress in an educational program. The numerous discrepancies led the committee to question the credentials presented."

In 2018, the Health Professions Appeal and Review Board expressed its "doubts that degrees from Canada Christian College meet the standards and rigour normally expected of degree programs in Canada".

In response to the Toronto Star opinion article citing these allegations, the college released a statement stating that "Canada Christian College offers a robust and excellent Christian Counselling degree program at the undergraduate and graduate level. CCC does not directly teach registered psychotherapy as a program. Some graduates do choose to professionally go down that path and many have been accepted and registered by the CRPO, some have been rejected."

== Public worship and events ==
After the COVID-19 pandemic, the College launched a Tuesday night worship service in the Canada Event Centre called "The River". The River has been reported to draw 2,000–3,000 people weekly and the college states that more than 75,000 people have participated in the event overall.

== Controversies ==
The president of the college, Charles McVety, has a history of making controversial remarks regarding homosexuality in 2010 and Islam in 2011.

=== Department of Jewish Studies ===
In 1991, the college was the subject of complaints by the Canadian Jewish Congress for its plans to have a "Jewish studies" department which, it was alleged, would be teaching classes meant to train students to convert Jews to Christianity. Bernie Farber of the CJC said of the college "We will take on any group whose aim is to destroy Judaism, philosophically, spiritually or directly." Rev. Malvern Jacobs and Rev. Edward Brotsky were the dean and vice-dean of the new department and were described as messianic Jews. Jacobs later served as dean of Canada Christian College. In 1999, Pardes Shalom Cemetery barred Malvern Jacobs from being buried in the cemetery as Jacobs had converted to Christianity and become a messianic Jew. Pardes Shalom locked its gates to prevent Jacobs's casket and his funeral procession of 400 mourners from entering the cemetery.

In 1998, the Canadian Jewish Congress opposed a private member's bill that would have conferred degree-granting status on Canada Christian College. The Congress alleged that the college's Jewish Studies Department had been promoting the proselytization of Jews. The CJC withdrew its opposition after the college agreed to disband the department. McVety told Canadian Jewish News, "We want to make it very clear that the Canada Christian College does not approve of or engage in any process to convert Jews to Christianity."

In 2003, McVety joined with B'nai Brith to participate in its countermissionary campaign and voiced his opposition to groups such as Jews for Jesus. "As a committed Christian I support the idea of preaching Christianity, but preaching Christianity under the guise of Judaism to those who are in fact seeking Judaism, is plainly wrong," said McVety.

In 2008, Frank Dimant, executive vice-president of B'nai Brith Canada, was appointed the Chair of the newly inaugurated Department of Modern Israel Studies; he was promoted to dean in 2015 and remained with the college until 2019.

College president Charles McVety is national chairman of Christians United for Israel - Canada, a pro-Israel advocacy organization and the Canadian affiliate of the American Christian Zionist organization led by John Hagee. The college houses the Canadian seminary outreach program of the International Fellowship of Christians and Jews, one of the foremost humanitarian organizations operating in the Middle East.

Former Canadian Prime Minister Stephen Harper received the Israel Allies Award at a gala dinner at Canada Christian College Thursday, October 20, 2022. The award is the highest honor given by the Israel Allies Foundation (IAF) to pro-Israel leaders. The IAF event was held in partnership with Canada Christian College and was attended by more than 600 people, including members of the Canadian parliament, local rabbis and pastors.

President Charles McVety is well known for his support for Israel and was ranked No. 15 in the world on the Israel Allies Foundation's list of Israel's Top 50 Christian Allies List in 2022.

=== Muslims ===
In 2011, Canada Christian College invited and hosted Geert Wilders, an anti-Islam politician who has called for the banning of the Koran. During his speech, Wilders said that moderate Islam does not exist, and that Canadian Muslims were a danger to democracy. Geert Wilders won the election in November 2024.

Charles McVety, president of the Canada Christian College, has said: "Islam is not just a religion, it's a political and cultural system as well and we know that Christians, Jews and Hindus don't have the same mandate for a hostile takeover."

The Toronto Muslim community rejected the above comment, stating they had no intention of any hostile takeover. The Canadian Council on American-Islamic Relations also expressed concern at the remarks made by McVety.

In December 2017, the auditorium of Canada Christian College was rented to host Pamela Geller, who is known for her anti-Muslim views, to speak at an event.

== See also ==
- List of evangelical seminaries and theological colleges
- Ontario Student Assistance Program
- Higher education in Ontario
- Institute for Canadian Values ad controversy
