= Sigal G. Barsade =

American business theorist (1965–2022)

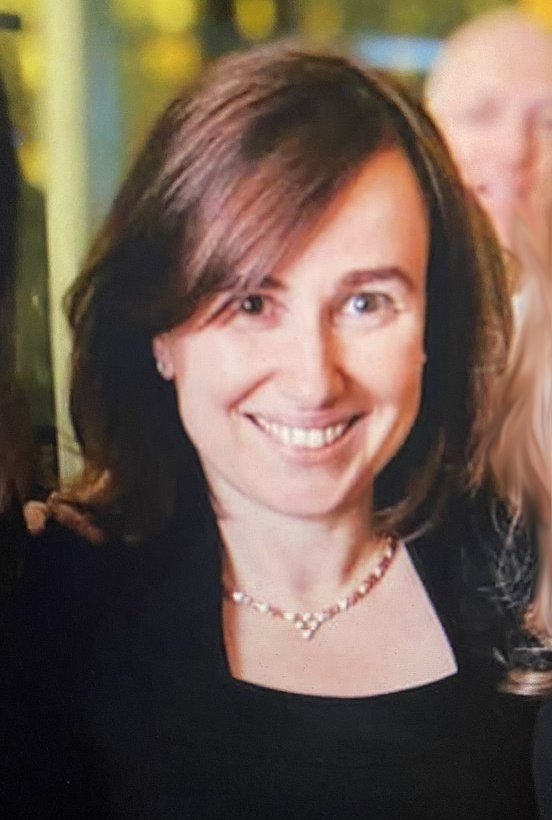
- Born: 28 August 1965; Haifa, Israel
- Died: 6 February 2022 (aged 56); Philadelphia, U.S.
- Known for: Research on workplace emotion

Academic background
- Education: University of California, Berkeley; University of California, Los Angeles

Academic work
- Discipline: Business
- Sub-discipline: Micro-organizational behavior
- Institutions: University of Pennsylvania
- Main interests: Emotional intelligence, emotions in organizations

Sigal G. Barsade (28 August 1965 – 6 February 2022) was an Israeli-American business theorist and researcher, and was the Joseph Frank Bernstein Professor of Management at the Wharton School. In addition to research, she worked as a speaker and consultant to large corporations across a variety of industries, such as Coca-Cola, Deloitte, Google, IBM, KPMG and Merrill Lynch, healthcare organizations such as GlaxoSmithKline and Penn Medicine, and public and nonprofit corporations such as the World Economic Forum and the United Nations. At the peak of the COVID-19 pandemic, Barsade co-chaired a task force of scholars aiming to utilize behavioral science to increase COVID-19 Vaccine Uptake.

== Career ==
Barsade's interest in organizational behavior began at a young age. Her father would recount tales of his experiences at work during family dinners, often commenting on his approach to leadership and managerial decision making.

Barsade graduated with a Bachelor of Arts degree in Psychology (magna cum laude, Phi Beta Kappa) in 1986, where her senior honors thesis under Dr. Bert Raven and an elective course in industrial/ organizational psychology began her career in the field of organizational behavior. After a series of positions in industrial and start-up organizations, she enrolled for her PhD in Organizational Behavior and Industrial Relations from Haas School of Business at University of California, Berkeley, where her two mentors included Professors Barry M. Staw and Charles A. O’Reilly. She received the Hayase Award at UC Berkeley in 1992. Her most highly cited article, “The Ripple Effect: Emotional Contagion and its Influence on Group Behavior,” is based on her dissertation work at Berkeley, focusing on the use of multiple methodologies triangulating in on a novel theoretical construct of contagion. This paper was cited by Thomson Reuters’ Essential Science Indicators as one of the most cited papers, and chosen as a “Fast Moving Front” on ScienceWatch in May, 2009.

Barsade was a scholar of emotional contagion, emotional intelligence, and organizational culture, and is credited with coining the term “affective revolution in organizations” to capture the growing body of research on emotions in organizations and groups. She co-created and co-led Wharton's teamwork and leadership course for MBA students with Nancy Rothbard. She was the Joseph Frank Bernstein Professor of Management at the Wharton School of the University of Pennsylvania and was previously an Associate Professor of Management at Yale. Barsade also contributed in various capacities at the Academy of Management, most recently as OB Division Chair.

Barsade mentored women and junior scholars, supported the Black Lives Matter movement, served as a board member at several organizations and charities, and as an expert witness. She also helped co-found the CT Children's Museum.

== Personal life ==
Barsade died on February 6, 2022, at the age of 56, after two years with glioblastoma.

== Honors ==
Barsade received accolades for her scholarly work including the “2020 ASQ Award for Scholarly Contribution” and the “2017 Academy of Management Perspectives Decade Award”.

== Select publications ==
- Barsade, Sigal. "Research articles by Sigal Barsade". Wharton School.
- Barsade, S. G. (2021). What I have learned... In my journey as a scholar. In X.P. Chen & K.H. Steensma (Eds.), A Journey Toward Influential Scholarship: Insights from Leading Management Scholars. Oxford University Press.
- Barsade, S. G., Coutifaris, C. G. V., & Pillemer, J. (2018). Emotional contagion in organizational life. Research in Organizational Behavior. 38, 137–151.
- Barsade, S. G., & O'Neill, O. A. (2014). What's love got to do with it? A longitudinal study of the culture of companionate love and employee and client outcomes in a long-term care setting. Administrative Science Quarterly, 59(4), 551.
- Chatman, J. A., & Barsade, S. G. (1995). Personality, organizational culture, and cooperation: Evidence from a business simulation. Administrative Science Quarterly, 40 (3), 423–443.
