= Bill C-10: Income Tax Amendments Act, 2006 =

Canadian draft law introduced but not passed

Parliament of Canada
- Long title: An Act to amend the Income Tax Act, including amendments in relation to foreign investment entities and non-resident trusts, and to provide for the bijural expressions of the provisions of that Act.
- Commenced: Never enacted

Legislative history
- Bill title: Bill C-10, 39th Parliament, 2nd session
- Introduced by: Jim Flaherty, Minister of Finance
- First reading: House of Commons: October 29, 2007
- Second reading: House of Commons: October 29, 2007
- Third reading: House of Commons: October 29, 2007
- Member(s) in charge: Speaker pro tempore
- First reading: Senate: October 30, 2007
- Second reading: Senate: December 4, 2007
- Status: Not passed

Bill C-10: Income Tax Amendments Act, 2006 (French: Loi de 2006 modifiant l’impôt sur le revenu) was a bill introduced in the Canadian Parliament in 2007 by the Conservative government of Prime Minister Stephen Harper. It was numbered Bill C-10 of the second session of the 39th Parliament of Canada.

The bill contained a controversial clause which would have allowed the federal government to deny tax credits for films where public funding was deemed to be contrary to public policy. The clause attracted public criticism, with David Cronenberg and Sarah Polley arguing that the clause represented censorship of Canadian films. Others, such as Charles McVety and REAL Women of Canada, argued that the provision recognized that public funding should not be available for movies which were offensive to large numbers of people. Film producers, such as Steve Hoban, argued that the clause would make it harder to make movies in Canada.

After public outcry, Prime Minister Harper announced that the bill would not be passed with the controversial clause included.

== Legislative history ==
The bill was first introduced as Bill C-33 in 2006, in the first session of the 39th Parliament. It passed all legislative stages in the House of Commons by June 2007 and then received first reading in the Senate that same month. However, it did not pass the Senate before the prorogation of Parliament.

The bill was re-introduced in the Commons as Bill C-10 during the 2nd session. By order of the House, it was deemed approved at all stages completed in the previous session, effective October 29, 2007. The bill then was introduced in the Senate the next day, October 30, 2007. It passed second reading on December 4, 2007, and was referred to committee.

The bill did not pass the Senate prior to the dissolution of Parliament for the 2008 general election.

== Content of the bill ==
The long title of the bill was "An Act to amend the Income Tax Act, including amendments in relation to foreign investment entities and non-resident trusts, and to provide for the bijural expression of the provisions of that Act". Among a 600-page list of minor changes to tax law, the bill contained a clause that would have amended s. 125.4 of the Income Tax Act to give the Minister of Canadian Heritage the power to deny taxation credits for films made in Canada, if the Minister concluded that public financial support of the production would be "contrary to public policy".

== Public reaction ==
Critics of the clause argued that it was equivalent to censorship because most Canadian films cannot afford to be produced without government assistance. After the Bill passed the Commons on October 29, 2007, opposition parties said that they did not notice the controversial clause. Several Senators said that they intended to send the bill back to the Commons.

At the Senate hearings on the bill, the Minister of Canadian Heritage gave an explanation for the clause. She said that the test of "contrary to public policy" had been used in the regulations, and that the clause had been included by previous drafts of the bill proposed by the previous Liberal government. She also explained the purpose for the clause: "It ensures that the government has the ability, in exceptional circumstances, to exclude certain material from public support. There is material that is potentially illegal under the Criminal Code, such as indecent material, hate propaganda, and child pornography. Currently, no provision in the Income Tax Act or regulations exclude such material. Bill C-10 addresses this loophole, in particular."

The hearings in the Senate committee on the bill were described as a "gong show" by Jim Abbott, MP, the parliamentary secretary to the Minister of Canadian heritage. Opponents of the clause, such as director David Cronenberg and actor-director Sarah Polley argued that it amounted to government censorship of videos and movies. Supporters of the clause, such as Charles McVety, president of the Canada Family Action Coalition, and Diane Watts, a researcher with REAL Women of Canada, argued that public funding should not be given to movies which are offensive to large numbers of Canadians.

Iconic of the debate was a contemporary Canadian film titled Young People Fucking. The film contained no pornographic material and received favourable reviews and a relatively wide distribution for a Canadian film. It was released in 2007, a year after the clause had first been introduced in Bill C-36 in 2006. However, it was cited by some Conservative parliamentarians as an example of a film which would not receive financial aid under Bill C-10. Senators and MPs were invited to view an advance screening of the film.

Steve Hoban, the producer of the film, explained that the clause would introduce uncertainty into the funding arrangements for film productions. In his view, uncertainty about the availability of tax credits would make it more difficult to get financing for movies in Canada, which would likely drive production out of Canada to other countries with more favourable tax regimes. Ernst & Young financing specialist Neal Clarance said that the lack of clear definitions on what is "contrary to public policy" would make it extremely difficult for film producers to obtain financing. The Royal Bank of Canada stated that the uncertainties would limit their ability to fund Canadian productions. Sam Sullivan, the mayor of Vancouver, testified against the clause, arguing that it would have a negative impact on the Canadian film industry, which provided large numbers of jobs. The mayors of Toronto and Montreal also testified against the clause, while the Mayor of Halifax sent a letter opposing the clause.

== Outcome ==
The bill did not pass the Senate committee prior to the dissolution of Parliament for the 2008 Canadian federal election.

When the Conservative Party released their platform for the election, Prime Minister Harper announced that if re-elected, they would not proceed with the clause.
