= Institute for Canadian Values ad controversy =

2011 controversy in Canada surrounding discriminatory newspaper advertisements

On September 24, 2011, the National Post, a major daily newspaper in Toronto, Ontario, Canada, ran an advertisement paid for by the Institute for Canadian Values (ICV). The advertisement argued against the teaching of LGBTQ-related sex education topics in the Ontario school curriculum, and was criticized for alleged discrimination against transsexual, transgender, intersex, and two-spirited people. It was supported by the Canada Christian College, which houses the ICV.

Following the controversy, the National Post apologized for the advertisement on September 30 and withdrew the ad from circulation. Two days after the National Post’s apology, on October 2, 2011, the Toronto Sun, a major Toronto conservative newspaper, ran an abridged version of the ad, derivatives of which also ran on subsidiaries of the Sun's then-owner, Sun Media. The Sun refused to apologize for running the ad, arguing it was a "principled defence of freedom of speech", though their publisher apologized and stated the Sun had agreed to never run the ad again.

The advertisement was heavily criticized by the LGBTQ community in Canada.

== Background ==
The National Post, owned by Postmedia Network, is a major Canadian newspaper and one of the core newspapers of Toronto. It was founded in 1998 around the Financial Post, a Canadian business newspaper first published in 1907, that was eventually reorganized to become the Post's financial section. The National Post aligns itself with the views of the Conservative Party of Canada.

The Toronto Sun, then owned by Sun Media and currently owned by Postmedia, is a major newspaper in Toronto and also one of the core newspapers serving Toronto. It was founded in 1971 as the "spiritual successor" to the Toronto Telegram, which ceased operations that same year. Like the National Post and the Toronto Telegram, the Sun aligns itself with the views of the Conservative Party. The Sun has previously been described as an example of tabloid journalism.

The Institute for Canadian Values is an organization that describes itself as "a national think-tank dedicated to advancing knowledge of public policy issues from Judeo-Christian intellectual and moral perspectives". It is housed and supported by the Canada Christian College.

The Canada Christian College is an Evangelical Christian Bible college located in Whitby. The College's ability to grant degrees and its status as a university has been contested over time; as of 2022, it is an accredited private degree-granting institution that does not have official university status. The College has been criticized over allegations of controversial political and religious views, efforts to proselytize members of other religions, poor quality of teaching with few job prospects, and the actions and statements of its president, evangelical minister Charles McVety, a prominent figure of the Canadian Christian right.

== Advertisement publication ==
=== National Post ===
The advertisement first appeared on the September 24, 2011 edition of the National Post. It was paid for by the Institute for Canadian Values and was supported by the Canada Christian College.

The full-page advertisement depicted a sad-looking young girl with the caption "I’m a girl. Don’t teach me to question if I’m a boy, transsexual, transgendered, intersexed or two spirited". The ad opposed proposed curriculum for LGBTQ sex education in Ontario schools, which included teaching children between junior kindergarten and Grade 3 about sexual orientations and LGBTQ-related topics. It quoted several lines from the actual curriculum, mostly taken out of context, claiming the lessons and activities described would become mandatory. The ad argued that such teachings would be confusing to children and would have a corrupting influence, and called on political figures such as Dalton McGuinty, Tim Hudak, and Andrea Horwath to take action against the proposed curriculum.

==== Retraction and apology ====
On September 30, 2011, the National Post retracted the ICV advertisement and published an apology, stating it would not run the ad again. The Post did not specify how the advertisement got past their censors, but stated that procedures to qualify ads were not followed in this case. In the apology, the Post asserted its right to post such an ad, stating that it "believe[s] unpopular points of view should not be censored simply because some readers may find them disturbing, or even offensive". It also defended the contents of the ad itself, explaining that it was "attempting to make the case that the Ontario curriculum was teaching very young children about issues that, at that age, should be the domain of parents". However, the Post admitted that the advertisement "exceeded the bounds of civil discourse … in its tone and manipulative use of a picture of a young girl", and that allowing the ad to be published was a mistake on its part. The Post clarified it felt like the ICV did not meet "a standard of tone and respect that is consistent with furthering constructive dialogue about important public policy issues", and stated it would donate the money received from the ICV for the ad to an unnamed LGBTQ organization.

Soon after the Post issued their apology, they revised and republished it the same day, removing text referring to discrimination against "people who have made choices about their sexuality". The Post replaced the text with objections to the ICV "singling out groups of people with whose sexuality the group disagrees".

=== Toronto Sun ===
In spite of the backlash surrounding the National Post's publication of the advertisement, Sun Media ran a modified version of the ad on page 27 of the Toronto Sun’s October 2, 2011 edition. The ad is smaller and minimally different but still contains "the features … that the Post characterized as unacceptable in its apology". The ad was also shown on SUN TV, a television station owned by Sun Media, as late as October 14. The Sun refused to apologize for running the ad, arguing that it was a "principled defence of Charles McVety’s freedom of speech", though its publisher, Mike Power, stated that the Sun chose not to run the ad again.

== Progressive Conservative Party flyer controversy ==
Around the time of the ICV advertisement controversy, the Progressive Conservative Party of Ontario was criticized for distributing campaign flyers that also criticized the proposed curriculum changes. The flyer claimed the curriculum proposed activities such as "cross-dressing for six-year-olds" and "a kissing booth". The section cited in the flyer actually referred to a list of prominent LGBTQ people, and the kissing booth was a distortion of "an idea to give chocolates to students who complete a 'school climate' survey". PC leader Tim Hudak defended the contents of the flyers.

== Criticism ==
The advertisement drew controversy from the media and the public. The LGBTQ community in Canada criticized the advertisement as an offensive and deliberate attack towards transsexual and transgender people. Part of the backlash was an open letter signed by numerous LGBTQ associations in Canada such as the Lesbian Gay Bi Trans Youth Line, Rainbow Health Ontario, Ontario Aids Network, and Fife House, condemning the ad's publication.
