= Nancy Rothbard =

Associate Professor

- Born: Philadelphia, Pennsylvania, USA
- Spouse: Brian Bushee

Academic background
- Education: A.B., 1990, Brown University; Ph.D., 1998, Organizational Behavior, University of Michigan
- Thesis: Enriching or depleting?: the dynamics of engagement in work and family (1998; 28 years ago)

Academic work
- Institutions: Wharton School of the University of Pennsylvania; Kellogg School of Management; Harvard Business School

Nancy Paige Rothbard is the Deputy Dean and David Pottruck Professor of Management at the Wharton School of the University of Pennsylvania. She studies the impact of emotions on work, specifically in areas of workplace motivation, teamwork, and work–life balance.

== Early life and education ==
Born and raised in Philadelphia, Pennsylvania, Rothbard assisted with the family office supply and furniture business. Rothbard graduated from Brown University in 1990. She published her undergraduate history thesis Nineteenth century British Psychiatry: Professionalization, Somatic Theorization and Practice in 1990 with advisor Ian Dowbiggin. Inspired by her mother Aileen returning to school for her PhD, she became interested in research and became a research associate at Harvard Business School. While working under the guidance of John Kotter, Rothbard interviewed successful male and female executives and was "struck by the fact that non-work subjects like divorces and problems with kids kept creeping into the conversation."

== Career ==
Rothbard pursued her PhD in Organizational Behavior at the University of Michigan, where she met her future husband Brian Bushee. Upon receiving her PhD in 1998, Rothbard accepted a post-doctoral fellowship position at the Kellogg School of Management of Northwestern University. In 2000, both Rothbard and her husband accepted faculty positions at the Wharton School of the University of Pennsylvania. Within the same year, she became a member of the American Psychological Association. She was subsequently nominated for the Rosabeth Moss Kanter Award for Excellence in Work-Family Research for her project titled "Managing multiple roles: Work-family policies and individuals’ desires for segmentation." In January 2006, Rothbard led a survey of 460 employees to judge their happiness while working at a large public university. Her research team found that one would be happiest at their job if their employer supported their personal preference for managing work/family identities. If there were childcare options did not follow their own vision, they would be less happy at their place of employment.

In 2009, Rothbard and Sigal Barsade helped launch Wharton's MBA core course, Foundations of Leadership and Teamwork. The following year, she was appointed the David Pottruck Associate Professor of Management and received the Wharton Teaching and Curriculum Innovation Award. While serving in this role, she co-led a week-long program called "Women’s Executive Leadership: Business Strategies for Success" with Monica McGrath to assist female executives and those who aspire to leadership roles. Rothbard also collaborated with researchers at Columbia Business School and Ohio State University to test whether forcing co-workers to attend work social events led to improved workplace relationships. They conducted two surveys; one focusing on 228 MBA students and another including 141 individuals in the United States workforce. Their overall findings found that such social events only improved workplace relationships among those of similar racial backgrounds.

As a result of her research into the impact of emotions on work, specifically in areas of workplace motivation, teamwork, and work–life balance, Rothbard was named a Penn Fellow during the 2015 academic year. The following year, she was appointed chair of the Management Department at Wharton, becoming the first woman to hold this role in institution history. During the COVID-19 pandemic in North America, Rothbard studied how families were adjusting to the increase in remote work. This accumulated into a Harvard Business Review article titled Building Work-Life Boundaries in the WFH Era, about how employees were "navigating the divide between work and home during the pandemic."
