= Charles McVety =

Canadian evangelical minister and Christian right activist

Charles H. McVety
- Born: 1959 (age 66–67)

Charles H. McVety (born 1959) is a Canadian evangelical Christian leader and conservative political activist. He has been the president of Canada Christian College in Whitby, Ontario since 1993, taking over for his father, and was president of Canada Family Action until 2008. He is perhaps best known for campaigning to repeal the law legalizing same-sex marriage in Canada. McVety played a significant role in helping to elect Doug Ford as the leader of the Progressive Conservative Party of Ontario. According to the CBC, McVety is "one of the most powerful leaders of the Christian Right in [Canada]".

On October 27, 2020, the Legislative Assembly of Ontario passed a motion to "condemn the extreme and hateful invective of Charles McVety and oppose any efforts to make Canada Christian College into an accredited university."

== Biography ==
McVety is the son of Betty and Elmer S. McVety (1928-1993), who was a Christian and Missionary Alliance pastor, television preacher, and the founder of Canada Christian College. He was born in Winnipeg, Manitoba and moved with his family to Toronto in the mid-1960s. Charles McVety's grandfather, Hugh John McVety (1900-1962), had been dean of Winnipeg Bible College. Charles McVety's uncle was evangelist John Wesley White, an associate of Billy Graham.

McVety is married to Jennifer McVety, Registrar of Canada Christian College, and has two adult children, Ryan, CEO of Canada Christian College, and Shannon, Executive Assistant at Canada Christian College.

=== Education ===
Charles McVety claims he received a Bachelor of Arts in 1980 at Canada Christian College in Winnipeg and his Master of Arts at the same college in 1984. McVety claims to have earned a Ph.D from Korea International Cultural University in 2017, calling his dissertation "The Betrayal of Conservative Values." In 2000, McVety received an honorary degree of "Doctor of Literature Honoris Causa" from Saint Petersburg State University.

In an archived official biography of McVety from the Canada Christian College's website, McVety claims to have a Doctors of Ministry from California State Christian University, an unaccredited and unrelated private Christian college in the United States.

=== Broadcasting career ===
He was the host of a national television program, Word.ca (also known as Word TV) on CTS and the Miracle Channel until he was censured by the Canadian Broadcast Standards Council for referring to the Toronto Pride parade as a "sex parade". His response to the censure was to claim that he was censored and that his freedom of speech was being violated. He now hosts Canadian Times TV, a national news commentary program airing on Daystar TV, an American satellite channel. He was also a regular guest on The Zelda Young Show on CHIN-FM.

==== Word TV in breach of Canadian Broadcast Standards Council codes ====
In December 2010, Crossroads Television System (CTS) pulled McVety's Word TV off the air, following a decision by the Canadian Broadcast Standards Council (CBSC) for statements made by McVety which were deemed to be in violation of the Council's standards and due to a lack of compliance with CTS's own code of ethics.

The first violation pertained to the relationship between opinion and fact with the Council finding against Word TV "because of the false and misleading underpinnings" of a "barrage of seemingly trustworthy information" that was determined by the CBSC to be "neither full, fair nor proper." Word TV was found in violation of the Council's broadcast codes for two errors of fact expressed by McVety in his discussion of gay people, one pertaining to erroneous statements that the Human Rights Tribunal of Ontario and the Alberta Human Rights Commission had a 100% "conviction rate" and the other pertaining to the criminalization of commentary by Bill C-250, an act to amend the Criminal Code with reference to hate propaganda, after the acceptance of which McVety stated erroneously that "it is now a crime to speak against homosexuality." As pertains to the Ontario Government's proposed revision of the Ontario school curriculum, the CBSC found McVety's "twisting of the purpose of the revisions is wrong-headed, unfair and improper." McVety had stated that the curriculum intended to "teach homosexuality".

In his statements regarding the Gay Pride Parade, the panel found McVety's implications that homosexuals prey on children "mis-characterizations" which were "excessive, inappropriate, disparaging, and abusive" and in breach of the Human Rights Clauses of its Code of Ethics and its Equitable Portrayal Code as well as other sections of the Equitable Portrayal Code.

McVety also claimed Satanic worship was widespread and rampant in Haiti. McVety said, "Unfortunately, Haitians are in trouble. When you practice such Satanism, you end up with a horrific government. They are the most corrupt government in the Western hemisphere. [...] Satan worship is flourishing.

The offending episodes aired on CTS between July 19, 2009 and February 21, 2010, and was given a rating of "G" in the English Canadian ratings system. The CBSC ordered CTS to announce the ruling at least twice on the air, and to take steps to ensure further breaches of the CBSC's codes do not occur.

=== Canada Christian College ===
Charles McVety has served as President of the Canada Christian College since 1993.

In 2020, the Canada Christian College applied to the Postsecondary Education Quality Assessment Board to rename itself a university and be granted the authority to grant degrees in arts and sciences.

In October 2020, the Legislative Assembly of Ontario passed Bill 213 to expand the college's degree-granting powers and permit the name change, but the legislation was not proclaimed, pending the PEQAB's decision.

In a report on October 29, 2020 in the Toronto Star, McVety's lawyer confirmed he had received over half a million dollars in a personal loan for a housing and car allowance, and that his son, Ryan McVety, had received $400,000 in loans for the same purposes.

A spokesperson for Minister of Colleges and Universities Ross Romano announced on May 21, 2021 that the “PEQAB has recommended that the institution not be granted expanded degree-granting authority or a name change at this time" and that "The minister has reviewed and accepts their recommendation.” Accordingly, Romano's spokesperson stated that “the government will not be proclaiming Schedule 2 of Bill 213 at this time.”

In response to the decision by Romano, McVety stated that it is the students at Canada Christian College who will suffer because of the "political corruptness" of the university proposal process. He further stated that "PEQAB put forward to the ministry a fraudulent misrepresentation of the college. The government was informed of the misrepresentations but refused to investigate...Our students and campus community deserved better from their government." He also intimated that Canada Christian College would be filing a lawsuit against PEQAB. Canada Christian College filed a lawsuit against PEQAB in 2022, which was dismissed, as was Canada Christian College's subsequent appeal.

=== Conservative politics ===
==== Harper Conservatives ====
A common theme of news coverage of McVety is the degree of his influence and that of his evangelical colleagues over Canadian Prime Minister Stephen Harper and the Conservative government generally. During the 2006 election, McVety registered several domains which bore the names of Liberal candidates, such as "josephvolpe.com" (a reference to Joe Volpe), and published pro-Conservative material there. He also attempted to sway a number of Conservative nomination candidates in favour of evangelical candidates. After the Conservative victory, McVety and evangelical colleagues were asked by Prime Minister Stephen Harper's office to help popularize his child-care plan. In November 2006, former Conservative Garth Turner claimed that McVety had once boasted to him of his influence with Prime Minister Stephen Harper, saying "I can pick up the phone and call Harper and I can get him in two minutes." McVety flatly denied saying this, after which Turner firmly reiterated his claim.

===== Bill C-10 involvement =====
On February 28, 2008, the Department of Canadian Heritage announced that it would be "expanding slightly" the criteria for denying tax credits to Canadian films to include gratuitous violence, significant sexual content that lacks an educational purpose, or denigration of an identifiable group; these changes were contained in Bill C-10. The following day, McVety claimed credit for this new policy, suggesting that its adoption was the result of a series of meetings he had with Stockwell Day, Rob Nicholson, and representatives of the Prime Minister's Office. He argued that "films promoting homosexuality, graphic sex or violence should not receive tax dollars", and indicated that many Conservative MPs, along with several homeless street preachers in downtown Edmonton, supported this goal.

However, on October 8, 2008 the new Conservative platform outlined plans not to re-introduce Bill C-10 if re-elected.

==== Doug Ford Progressive Conservatives ====
During the 2018 Ontario Progressive Conservative race, Mcvety endorsed Doug Ford. Ford considered Mcvety a friend, and has defending his government giving a grant to him and attend a Christmas event. McVety is associated with the PC government's rollback of the sex education curriculum in Ontario, having campaigned against the previous government because, he argued, the curriculum would teach children topics too sensitive for their age.

In 2023, Progressive Conservative campaign manager Kory Teneycke filed a lawsuit against McVety for defamation for claiming Teneycke was “on a campaign to drive Christians out of” the Progressive Conservatives.

==== Andrew Scheer Conservatives ====
In 2019, Mcvety announced that he would support the Conservative Party of Canada because they were the best interest to the Liberals and was critical of Maxime Bernier views on social issues such as support of same-sex marriage. Mcvety told the Toronto Star that they took credit for electing Andrew Scheer at the 2017 Conservative Party of Canada leadership election. After the 2019 Canadian federal election, he advocated for the removal of leader Andrew Scheer.

== Positions ==
=== Israel ===
McVety is national chairman of Christians United for Israel - Canada, a pro-Israel advocacy organization and the Canadian affiliate of the American Christian Zionist organization led by John Hagee and also associated with Pat Robertson, the late Jerry Falwell and Benny Hinn. He has organized a number of pro-Israel rallies, often in conjunction with B'nai Brith Canada and others in the Jewish community, held at Canada Christian College's auditorium.

=== Opposition to same-sex marriage ===
McVety is Senior Director of the Defend Marriage Coalition, a lobby group seeking to repeal the Civil Marriage Act (also called Bill C-38), the 2005 federal law legalizing same-sex marriage in Canada. In a November 2006 New York Times interview, he was quoted as saying that "With the legalization of gay marriage, faith has been violated and we've been forced to respond."

On December 2, 2006, McVety indicated he welcomed Canadian Prime Minister Stephan Harper's signal to hold a vote on repealing the legislation on December 6. In an article in The Globe and Mail that described him as having "the ear of the Conservatives", he was quoted as saying that "We have made our case and we have contacted the Members of Parliament and we hope they will reopen the debate and study the impact [of same-sex marriage] on society. ..." On the question of having an immediate vote, he stated that "the consensus, at the end of the day, was to restore the traditional definition of marriage or have no motion at all."

=== Anti-evolution ===
In the spring of 2008, McVety was involved in the promotion of the pro-intelligent design and anti-evolution film Expelled: No Intelligence Allowed. On June 12, 2008, he organized a poorly-attended protest outside the Royal Ontario Museum against its Darwin exhibit. McVety accused the ROM of "sugar coating" Darwin’s theory and of "cleansing the message" by omitting what he erroneously claimed were aspects of Darwinism that "propagate genocide and hatred." The rally immediately followed a special screening of Expelled at a nearby cinema.

=== Islam ===
In 2011, McVety's Canada Christian College invited and hosted Geert Wilders, an anti-Islam politician who has called for the banning of the Koran. McVety, president of the Canada Christian College, stated:

Islam is not just a religion, it’s a political and cultural system as well and we know that Christians, Jews and Hindus don’t have the same mandate for a hostile takeover.

The Toronto Muslim community rejected his comments, stating they had no intention of any hostile takeover. The North American Muslim Foundation said that "Wilders and his allies" will only heighten religious and cultural tensions. Canadian Council on American-Islamic Relations also expressed concern at the remarks made by McVety, and asked politicians to condemn Wilders' anti-Muslim views.

=== Environmentalism ===
McVety has been strongly critical of the environmental movement, claiming that it leads to worship of the earth and the abandonment of God. He declared his opposition to a carbon cap-and-trade system to avert anthropogenic climate change in his cover story for the August/September 2009 issue of Evangelical Christian Magazine: "I believe this taxing and trading of "air" will fund the one world government of the Anti-Christ." Earlier, in the magazine's Feb/Mar 2009 issue, he praised conservative evangelical pastor James Dobson for leading the move to force Rev. Richard Cizik from his position as vice-president for governmental affairs of the National Association of Evangelicals, because of his advocacy of creation care theology, and linked the resignation of Ted Haggard from the presidency of the organization to his support for the same position.
