= Bruce Dowbiggin =

Canadian sports broadcaster, journalist and writer

- Born: Montreal, Quebec, Canada
- Education: University of Toronto (BA)
- Occupations: Sports broadcaster, journalist, writer
- Years active: 1984–present
- Known for: Calgary Herald; The Globe and Mail; CBC Newsworld
- Family: Ian Dowbiggin (brother)
- Awards: Gemini Awards (2)

Bruce Dowbiggin is a Canadian sports broadcaster, journalist and writer. A graduate of the University of Toronto, Dowbiggin has worked as a journalist for the Calgary Herald and The Globe and Mail and as a broadcaster for CBC Newsworld. He has authored several books about ice hockey and received two Gemini Awards for sports broadcasting.

== Early life and education ==
Dowbiggin attended Lindsay Place High School in Pointe-Claire, Quebec, and then Nelson High School in Burlington, Ontario after his family moved. In 1974, Dowbiggin was one of the early editors of The Medium, the student newspaper of the University of Toronto Mississauga. He graduated in 1977, with a degree in English and Drama. After graduation, he was briefly a playwright with two plays produced in Toronto, and his poetry and prose were featured in literary collections.

== Career ==
=== 1980s–1990s ===
Dowbiggin began his journalistic career with TV Guide magazine before transitioning to broadcasting with CBC Radio in 1984. In 1985, he was the television sports anchor at CBC Toronto for The Six O'Clock News and CBC at Eleven. He later co-hosted the television broadcast of the 1988 Caribana parade, and began broadcasting with CBC Newsworld in 1990.

Dowbiggin made his reputation in journalism by investigating Alan Eagleson. Dowbiggin was the first Canadian journalist to report on investigations into Eagleson and how National Hockey League players' pensions were mismanaged, with a series of articles in 1991. Dowbiggin later collaborated with American journalist Russ Conway on another set of articles in February 1993. Dowbiggin was critical of how slowly the Law Society of Upper Canada investigated the allegations against Eagleson, prior to another article published by Stevie Cameron. CBC Sports did not initially show interest in the investigations, and his work was aired by The National and A Current Affair instead. Dowbiggin later said that television sports "ignore[s] the real problems when they come up", and also criticized sportcasters by saying "the idea of having to turn on one of their own is too difficult for them". His investigative reporting on Eagleson earned him a Gemini Award in 1993. Later in 1993, Dowbiggin released a book on Eagleson titled The Defense Never Rests.

Dowbiggin later investigated the influence of money in sports. He wrote the article "Pedal to the Medal", where he contrasted the efforts of Olympic hopeful Tanya Dubnicoff to athletes that had better funding. In 1996, he won his second Gemini Award as the best sports broadcaster. He was given the opportunity to anchor CBC's television coverage of the 1994 Commonwealth Games and 1996 Summer Olympics, as well as radio coverage of the 1998 Winter Olympics. Dowbiggin moved from Toronto to Calgary in 1998 to work for the Calgary Herald.

=== 2000s–present ===
In 2002, he released a book titled The Stick: A History, A Celebration, An Elegy which detailed the history of the hockey stick and players relationships with it. In 2003, Dowbiggin authored a book titled Money Players which was a finalist for the 2004 National Business Book Award. When an opportunity arose to replace longtime journalist Bill Houston at The Globe and Mail, Dowbiggin earned a job writing the media column. He stayed with The Globe and Mail from 2009 until 2013.

In 2014, Dowbiggin wrote Ice Storm: The Rise and Fall of the Greatest Vancouver Canucks Team Ever. The following year he worked with former National Hockey League player Grant Fuhr to write Fuhr's biography, Grant Fuhr: Portrait of a Champion.

In 2018, he released a book co-authored by Ryan Gauthier titled Cap in Hand which was a critique on the use of salary cap in professional sports.

Dowbiggin is a columnist at Not the Public Broadcaster alongside Rhys and Evan Dowbiggin, and works as a sports columnist for Troy Media. As of 2017, he contributes to SiriusXM Canada Talks Channel 167, and hosts a podcast titled The Full Count With Bruce Dowbiggin.

== Publications ==
List of publications:

- The Defense Never Rests (1993)
- Of Ice and Men (1999)
- The Stick: A History, A Celebration, An Elegy (2002)
- Money Players: How Hockey's Greatest Stars Beat the NHL at its Own Game (2003)
- The Trouble with Hockey (2004)
- Money players: The Amazing Rise and Fall of Bob Goodenow and the NHL Players Association (2006)
- The Meaning of Puck: How Hockey Explains Modern Canada (2008)
- Ice Storm: The Rise and Fall of the Greatest Vancouver Canucks Team Ever (2014)
- Grant Fuhr: Portrait of a Champion (2015)
- Cap in Hand with Ryan Gauthier (2018)

== Personal life ==
Dowbiggin is one of five sons born to Mary and Bill Dowbiggin in Montreal. His brother Ian Dowbiggin is a professor and author. His father Bill, served in the Royal Canadian Air Force as a bomber pilot. Dowbiggin's grandfather fought in World War I, and four of his family members fought in World War II for Canada.

== Bibliography ==
- Houston, William; Shoalts, David (1993). Eagleson: The Fall of a Hockey Czar. Whitby, Ontario: McGraw-Hill Ryerson Ltd. ISBN 0-07-551706-X.
