= Ian Dowbiggin =

Ian Robert Dowbiggin
- Born: 1952 (age 73–74)
- Education: University of Rochester, University of Toronto, MacMaster University
- Scientific career
- Fields: History
- Workplaces: University of Prince Edward Island
- Doctoral students: Nancy Rothbard

Ian Robert Dowbiggin FRSC (born 1952) is a professor in the Department of History at the University of Prince Edward Island and writer on the history of medicine, in particular topics such as euthanasia and physician-assisted suicide. His research and publications have been funded by the Social Sciences and Humanities Research Council of Canada and the Associated Medical Services. In 2011, he was made a Fellow of the Royal Society of Canada. He is the brother of Canadian sports broadcaster and author Bruce Dowbiggin.

== Euthanasia ==
Dowbiggin has written on the history of the euthanasia movement, including A Merciful End: The Euthanasia Movement in Modern America (2003) and A Concise History of Euthanasia: Life, Death, God, and Medicine (2005). He links the rise of euthanasia to an intellectual shift that took place in the late 19th and early 20th centuries, away from the moral precepts of the Judeo-Christian tradition. One important cause of this shift was social Darwinism, which had questioned the right of the "unfit" – such as the mentally handicapped – to live. Along with other intellectual currents such as social progressivism and Unitarianism, this led physicians and people like the founder of the Euthanasia Society of America, Charles Francis Potter, to accept the practice of euthanasia. Dowbiggin, a Catholic, points out that the Catholic Church "unequivocally opposed" sterilization and euthanasia programs, even before the advent of the Nazi euthanasia program, and that the Church is not given credit for that stance.

According to a review of A Concise History of Euthanasia by Sandra Woien in the American Journal of Bioethics, Dowbiggin sees euthanasia and eugenics as the inevitable results of abandoning the moral guidance of religion in medicine. Woien found that the book overemphasised the relationship between eugenics and euthanasia, and muddied "important conceptual and practical distinctions", but allowed that it may be "useful in understanding the historical context of euthanasia."

The Canadian Historical Association awarded Dowbiggin the Wallace K. Ferguson Prize for A Merciful End, stating that the book "gives a clear and evenly-balanced study of the history of euthanasia in the United States since the latter part of the nineteenth century", and concluded that it overall is a "masterful explanation of the way in which changing social, economic and disease-related factors have affected public interest in euthanasia."

Dowbiggin has spoken against euthanasia legislation and said that the Netherlands exists as a "cautionary lesson" for Canada in particular, showing that those places that "take a permissive attitude to assisted suicide keep pushing the boundaries."

== Sterilization ==
Dowbiggin published the book The Sterilization Movement and Global Fertility in the Twentieth Century in 2008. Drawing on scholarly sources, the book is primarily an account of sterilization as used for the purposes of eugenics and population control, examples including the use of sterilization by European fascists and the Indian mass sterilization program carried out during the 1975–1977 Emergency in India, which contributed to the downfall of Indira Gandhi's government.

Ulf Högberg, guest researcher of Public Health and Clinical Medicine at Umeå University, argued in the European Journal of Public Health that, "The book is most impressive, finely tuning the history between choice and compulsion of sterilization policy; sometimes it has been a fine line in between, sometimes an abyss of abuse of human rights."

A review in The New England Journal of Medicine, by Carolyn Westhoff, an official of the Planned Parenthood Federation of America, summed up by agreeing with the book's conclusion that "advocacy of sterilization as a solution to population growth leads to serious problems when that agenda overrides individual values and individual autonomy", but differed from it in stating that "Voluntary sterilization, however, deserves its great popularity and will remain valuable as one part of a broader menu of options for family planning."

== Partial bibliography ==
- The Quest for Mental Health: A Tale of Science, Medicine, Scandal, Sorrow, and Mass Society (2011)
- A Concise History of Euthanasia: Life, Death, God, and Medicine (2005)
- A Merciful End: The Euthanasia Movement in Modern America (2003)
- Suspicious Minds: The Triumph of Paranoia in Everyday Life (1999)
- Keeping America Sane: Psychiatry and Eugenics in the United States and Canada, 1880-1940 (1997)
- Inheriting Madness: Professionalization and Psychiatric Knowledge in 19th Century France (1991)

== Personal life ==
Dowbiggin is one of five sons born to Mary and Bill Dowbiggin in Montreal. His brother Bruce Dowbiggin is a sports broadcaster and author. His grandfather fought in World War I and four of his family members fought in World War II with Canada.
