= Culture of Canada =

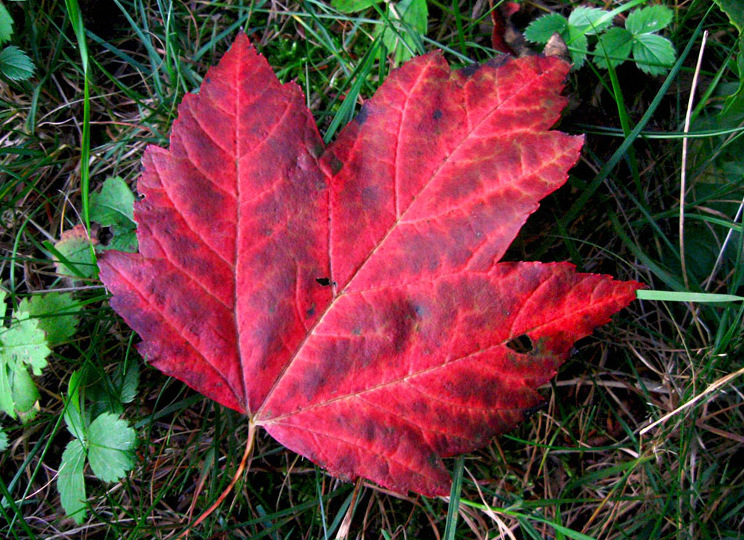
Perhaps the most prominent symbol of Canada, the maple leaf has been a de facto symbol since the 1700s.

The culture of Canada embodies the artistic, culinary, literary, humour, musical, political and social elements that are representative of Canadians. Throughout Canada's history, its culture has been influenced firstly by its indigenous cultures, and later by European culture and traditions, mostly by the British and French. Over time, elements of the cultures of Canada's immigrant populations have become incorporated to form a Canadian cultural mosaic. Certain segments of Canada's population have, to varying extents, also been influenced by American culture due to shared language (in English-speaking Canada), significant media penetration, and geographic proximity.

Canada is often characterized as being "very progressive, diverse, and multicultural". Canada's federal government has often been described as the instigator of multicultural ideology because of its public emphasis on the social importance of immigration. Canada's culture draws from its broad range of constituent nationalities, and policies that promote a just society are constitutionally protected. Canadian policies—such as abortion, euthanasia, same-sex marriage, and cannabis; an emphasis on cultural diversity; significant immigration; abolishing capital punishment; publicly funded health care; higher and more progressive taxation; efforts to eliminate poverty; and strict gun control are social indicators of the country's political and cultural values. Canadians view the country's institutions of health care, military peacekeeping, the national park system, and the Canadian Charter of Rights and Freedoms as integral to their national identity.

The Canadian government has influenced culture with programs, laws and institutions. It has created crown corporations to promote Canadian culture through media, such as the Canadian Broadcasting Corporation (CBC) and the National Film Board of Canada (NFB), and promotes many events which it considers to promote Canadian traditions. It has also tried to protect Canadian culture by setting legal minimums on Canadian content in many media using bodies like the Canadian Radio-television and Telecommunications Commission (CRTC).

== Cultural components ==
=== History ===
==== Influences ====
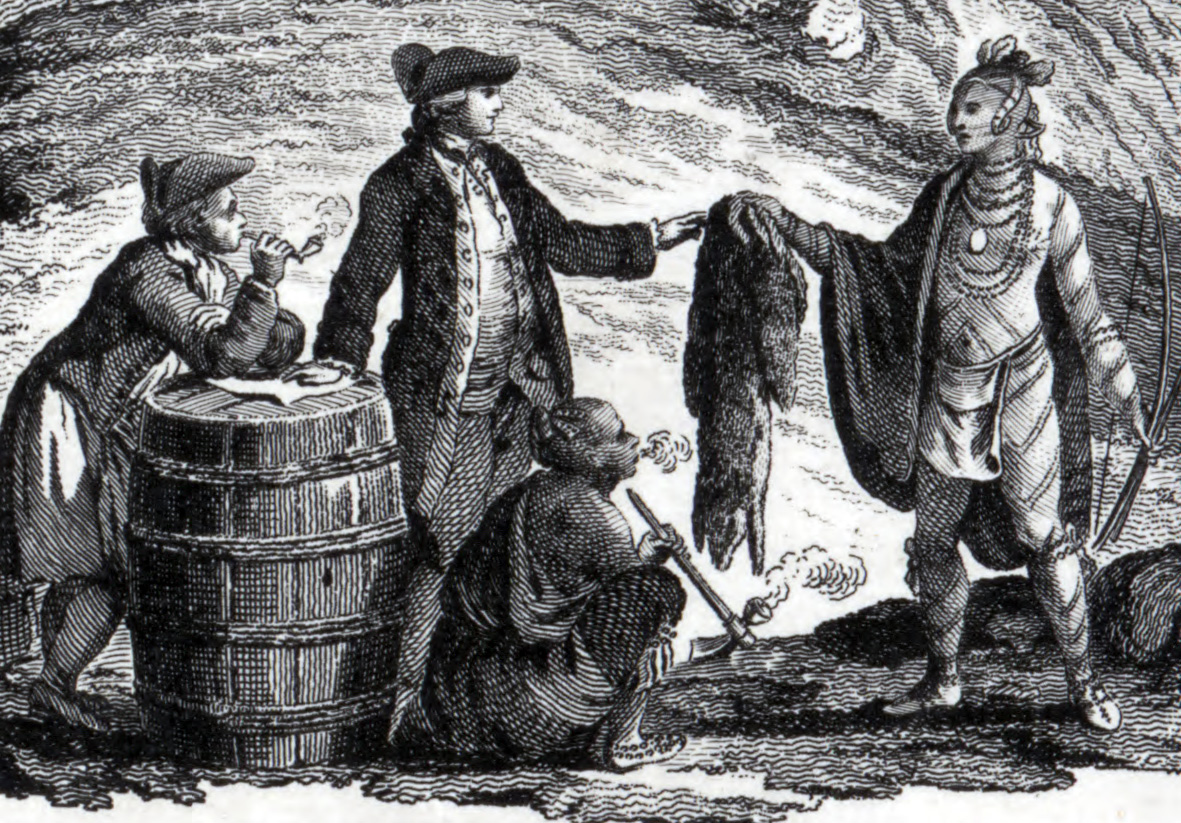
Fur traders at work as depicted in 1777 by Claude J. Sauthier

For thousands of years, Canada has been inhabited by indigenous peoples from a variety of different cultures and of several major linguistic groupings. Although not without conflict and bloodshed, early European interactions with First Nations and Inuit populations in what is now Canada were arguably peaceful. First Nations and Métis peoples played a critical part in the development of European colonies in Canada, particularly for their role in assisting European coureur des bois and voyageurs in the exploration of the continent during the North American fur trade. Over the course of three centuries, countless North American Indigenous words, inventions, concepts, and games have become an everyday part of Canadian language and use. Many places in Canada, both natural features and human habitations, use indigenous names. The name "Canada" itself derives from the St. Lawrence Huron-Iroquoian word "Kanata" meaning "village" or "settlement". The name of Canada's capital city Ottawa comes from the Algonquin language term "adawe" meaning "to trade".

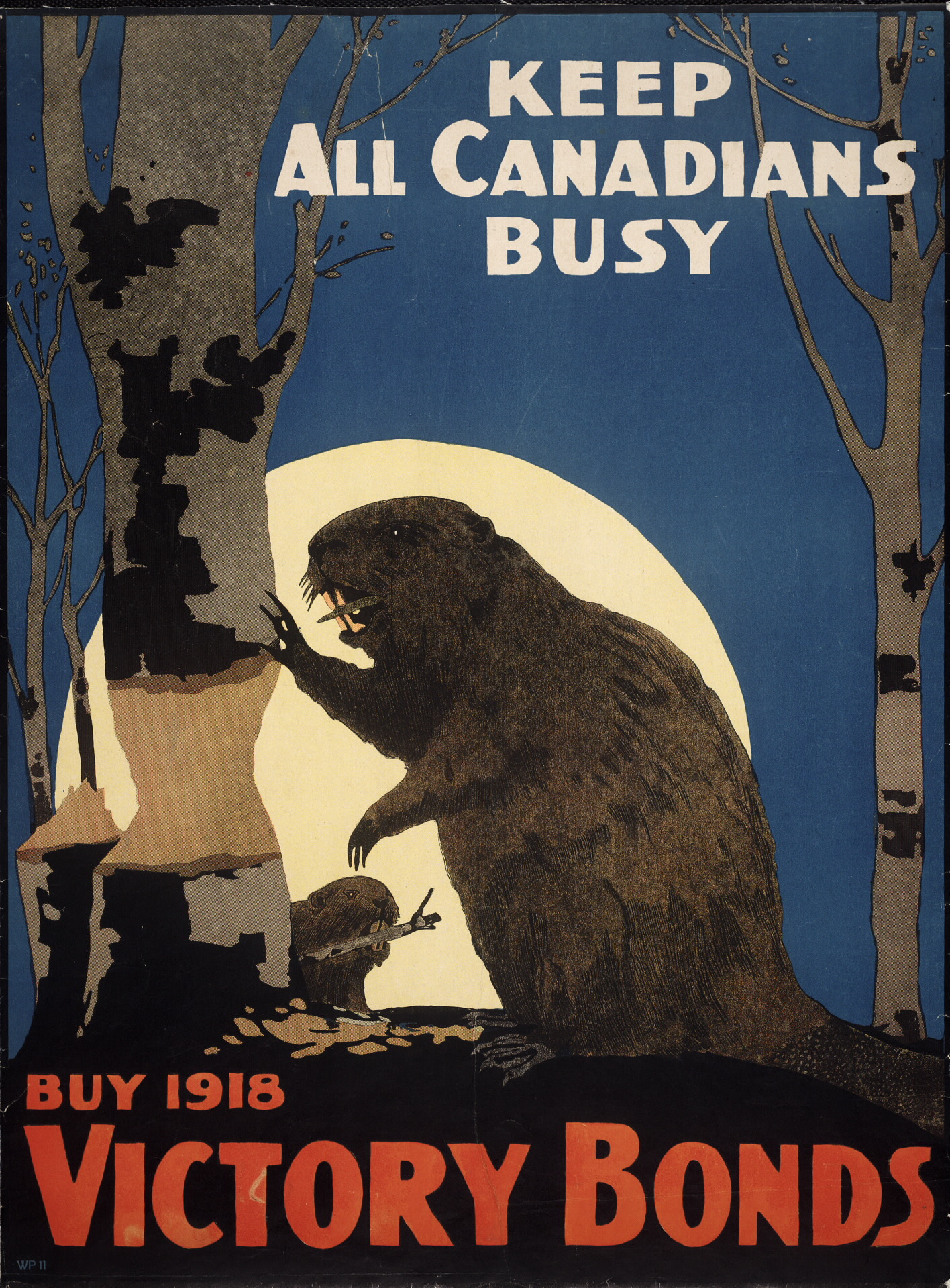
A Canadian war bond poster that depicts an industrious beaver, a national symbol of Canada

In the 17th-century, French colonials settled New France in Acadia, in the present-day Maritimes, and in Canada, along the St. Lawrence River in present-day Quebec and Ontario. These regions were under French control from 1534 to 1763. However, the British conquered Acadia in 1710 and conquered Canada in 1760. The British were able to deport most of the Acadians, but they were unable to deport the Canadiens of Canada because they severely outnumbered the British forces. The British therefore had to make deals with Canadiens and hope they would one day become assimilated. The American Revolution, from 1775 to 1783, provoked the migration of 40,000 to 50,000 United Empire Loyalists from the Thirteen Colonies to the newly conquered British lands, which brought American influences to Canada for the first time. Following the War of 1812, many Scottish and English people settled in Upper Canada and Lower Canada. Many Irish people fleeing the Great Famine also arrived between 1845 and 1852.

The Canadian Forces and overall civilian participation in the First World War and Second World War helped to foster Canadian nationalism; however, in 1917 and 1944, conscription crises highlighted the considerable rift along ethnic lines between Anglophones and Francophones. As a result of the First and Second World Wars, the Government of Canada became more assertive and less deferential to British authority. Canada, until the 1940s, was often described as "binational", with the 2 components being the cultural, linguistic and political identities of English Canadians and of French Canadians.

Legislative restrictions on immigration (such as the Continuous journey regulation and Chinese Immigration Act) that had favoured British, American and other European immigrants (such as Dutch, German, Italian, Polish, Swedish and Ukrainian) were amended during the 1960s, resulting in an influx of people of many different ethnicities. By the end of the 20th century, immigrants were increasingly Chinese, Indian, Vietnamese, Jamaican, Filipino, Lebanese, Pakistani and Haitian. By the 21st century Canada had thirty four ethnic groups with at least one hundred thousand members each, of which eleven have over 1 million people and numerous others are represented in smaller numbers. As of 2006, 16.2% of the population self-identify as a visible minority.

==== Development of popular culture ====
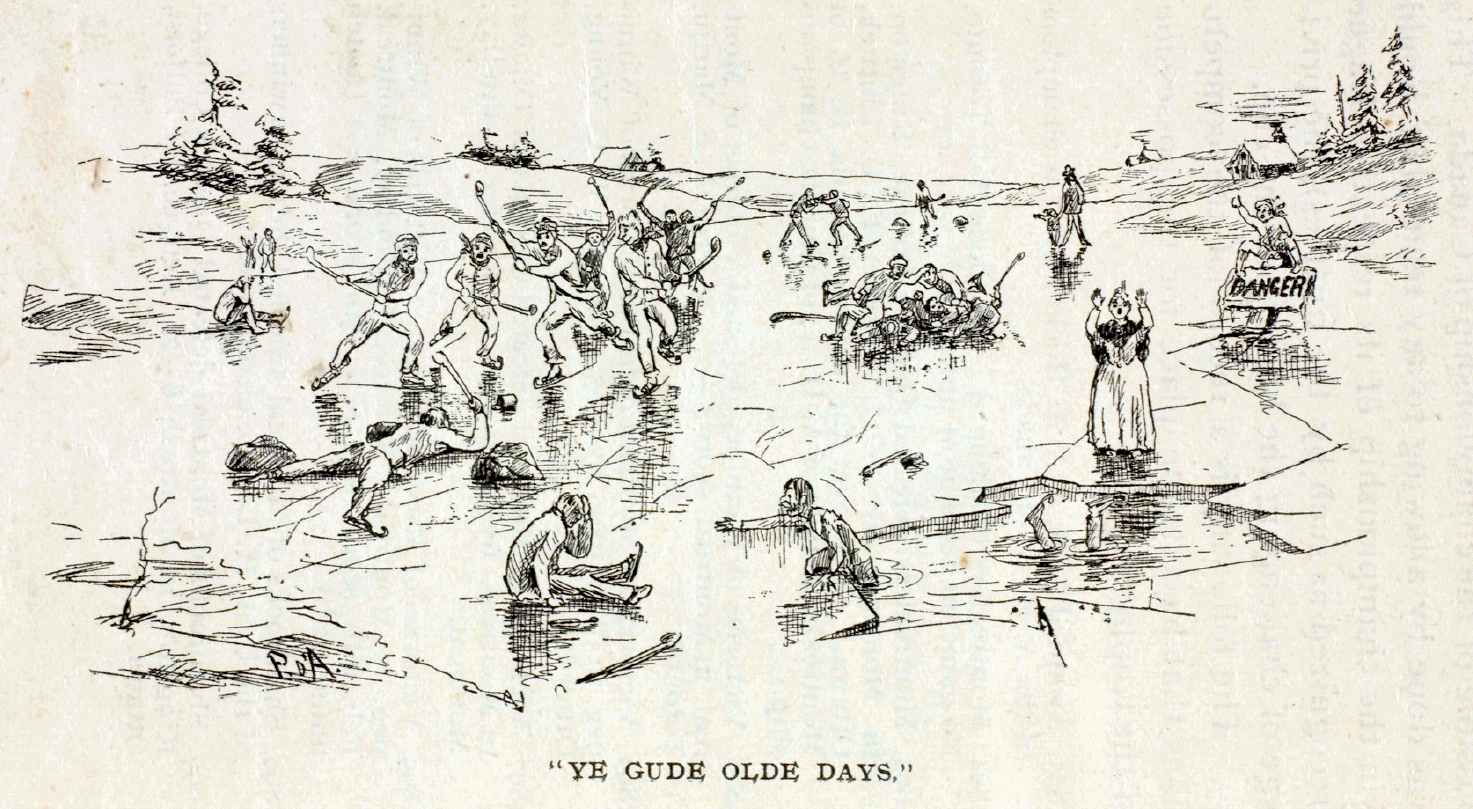
"Ye Gude Olde Days" from Hockey: Canada's Royal Winter Game, 1899

Themes and symbols of pioneers, trappers, and traders played an important part in the early development of Canadian culture. Modern Canadian culture as it is understood today can be traced to its time period of westward expansion and nation building. Contributing factors include Canada's unique geography, climate, and cultural makeup. Being a cold country with long winter nights for most of the year, certain unique leisure activities developed in Canada during this period including ice hockey and embracement of the summer indigenous game of lacrosse.

By the 19th century, Canadians came to believe themselves possessed of a unique "northern character," due to the long, harsh winters that only those of hardy body and mind could survive. This hardiness was claimed as a Canadian trait, and sports that reflected this, such as snowshoeing and cross-country skiing, were asserted as characteristically Canadian. During this period, the churches tried to influence leisure activities by preaching against drinking, and scheduling annual revivals and weekly club activities. In a society in which most middle-class families now owned a harmonium or piano, and standard education included at least the rudiments of music, the result was often an original song. Such stirrings frequently occurred in response to noteworthy events, and few local or national excitements were allowed to pass without some musical comment.

By the 1930s, radio played a major role in uniting Canadians behind their local or regional teams. Rural areas were especially influenced by sports coverage and the propagation of national myths. Outside the sports and music arena, Canadians expressed a national character of being hard working, peaceful, orderly and polite. "Roughing it" in cottage country a nostalgic "wilderness" activity where families connect with nature and pass-down traditions, has long been a part of Canadian identity, representing a shared cultural lifestyle.

=== Political culture ===
==== Cultural legislation ====
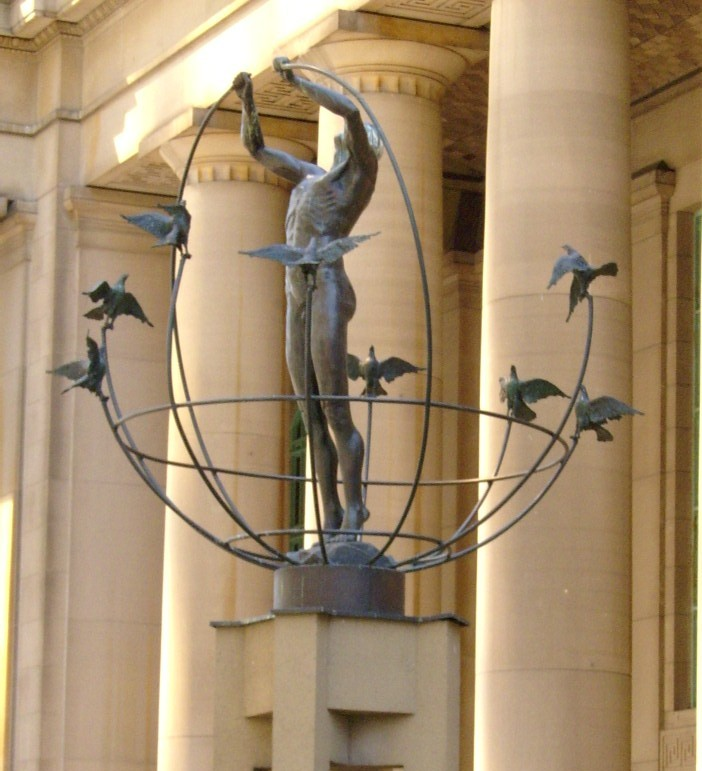
Monument to Multiculturalism by Francesco Pirelli, in Toronto

French Canada's early development was relatively cohesive during the 17th and 18th centuries, and this was preserved by the Quebec Act 1774, which allowed Roman Catholics to hold offices and practice their faith. The Constitution Act, 1867 was thought to meet the growing calls for Canadian autonomy while avoiding the overly strong decentralization that contributed to the Civil War in the United States. The compromises reached during this time between the English- and French-speaking Fathers of Confederation set Canada on a path to bilingualism which in turn contributed to an acceptance of diversity. The English and French languages have had limited constitutional protection since 1867 and full official status since 1969. Section 133 of the Constitution Act, 1867 (BNA Act) guarantees that both languages may be used in the Parliament of Canada. Canada adopted its first Official Languages Act in 1969, giving English and French equal status in the government of Canada. Doing so makes them "official" languages, having preferred status in law over all other languages used in Canada.

Prior to the advent of the Canadian Bill of Rights in 1960 and its successor the Canadian Charter of Rights and Freedoms in 1982, the laws of Canada did not provide much in the way of civil rights and this issue was typically of limited concern to the courts. Canada since the 1960s has placed emphasis on equality and inclusiveness for all people. Multiculturalism in Canada was adopted as the official policy of the Canadian government and is enshrined in Section 27 of the Canadian Charter of Rights and Freedoms. In 1995, the Supreme Court of Canada ruled in Egan v. Canada that sexual orientation should be "read in" to Section Fifteen of the Canadian Charter of Rights and Freedoms, a part of the Constitution of Canada guaranteeing equal rights to all Canadians. Following a series of decisions by provincial courts and the Supreme Court of Canada, on July 20, 2005, the Civil Marriage Act (Bill C-38) became law, legalizing same-sex marriage in Canada. Furthermore, sexual orientation was included as a protected status in the human-rights laws of the federal government and of all provinces and territories.

==== Contemporary politics ====
The Centre Block of the Canadian parliament buildings on Parliament Hill

Canadian governments at the federal level have a tradition of liberalism, and govern with a moderate, centrist political ideology. Canada's egalitarian approach to governance emphasizing social justice and multiculturalism, is based on selective immigration, social integration, and suppression of far-right politics that has wide public and political support. Peace, order, and good government are constitutional goals of the Canadian government.

Canada has a multi-party system in which many of its legislative customs derive from the unwritten conventions of and precedents set by the Westminster parliament of the United Kingdom. The country has been dominated by two parties, the centre-left Liberal Party of Canada and the centre-right Conservative Party of Canada. The historically predominant Liberals position themselves at the centre of the political scale, with the Conservatives sitting on the right and the New Democratic Party occupying the left. Smaller parties like the Quebec nationalist Bloc Québécois and the Green Party of Canada have also been able to exert their influence over the political process by representation at the federal level.

==== Nationalism and protectionism ====
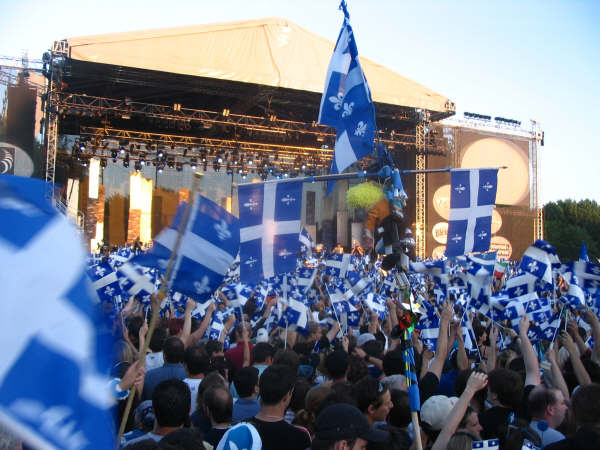
Quebec's National Holiday (French: La Fête nationale du Québec) is celebrated annually on June 24, St. John the Baptist Day.

In general, Canadian nationalists are concerned about the protection of Canadian sovereignty and loyalty to the Canadian State, placing them in the civic nationalist category. It has likewise often been suggested that anti-Americanism plays a prominent role in Canadian nationalist ideologies. A unified, bi-cultural, tolerant and sovereign Canada remains an ideological inspiration to many Canadian nationalists. Alternatively Quebecois nationalism and support for maintaining French Canadian culture many of whom were supporters of the Quebec sovereignty movement during the late-20th century.

Cultural protectionism in Canada has, since the mid-20th century, taken the form of conscious, interventionist attempts on the part of various Canadian governments to promote Canadian cultural production. Sharing a large border, a common language (for the majority), and being exposed to massive diffusions of American media makes it difficult for Canada to preserve its own culture versus being assimilated to American culture. While Canada tries to maintain its cultural differences, it also must balance this with responsibility in trade arrangements such as the General Agreement on Tariffs and Trade (GATT) and the United States–Mexico–Canada Agreement (USMCA).

==== Foreign relations ====
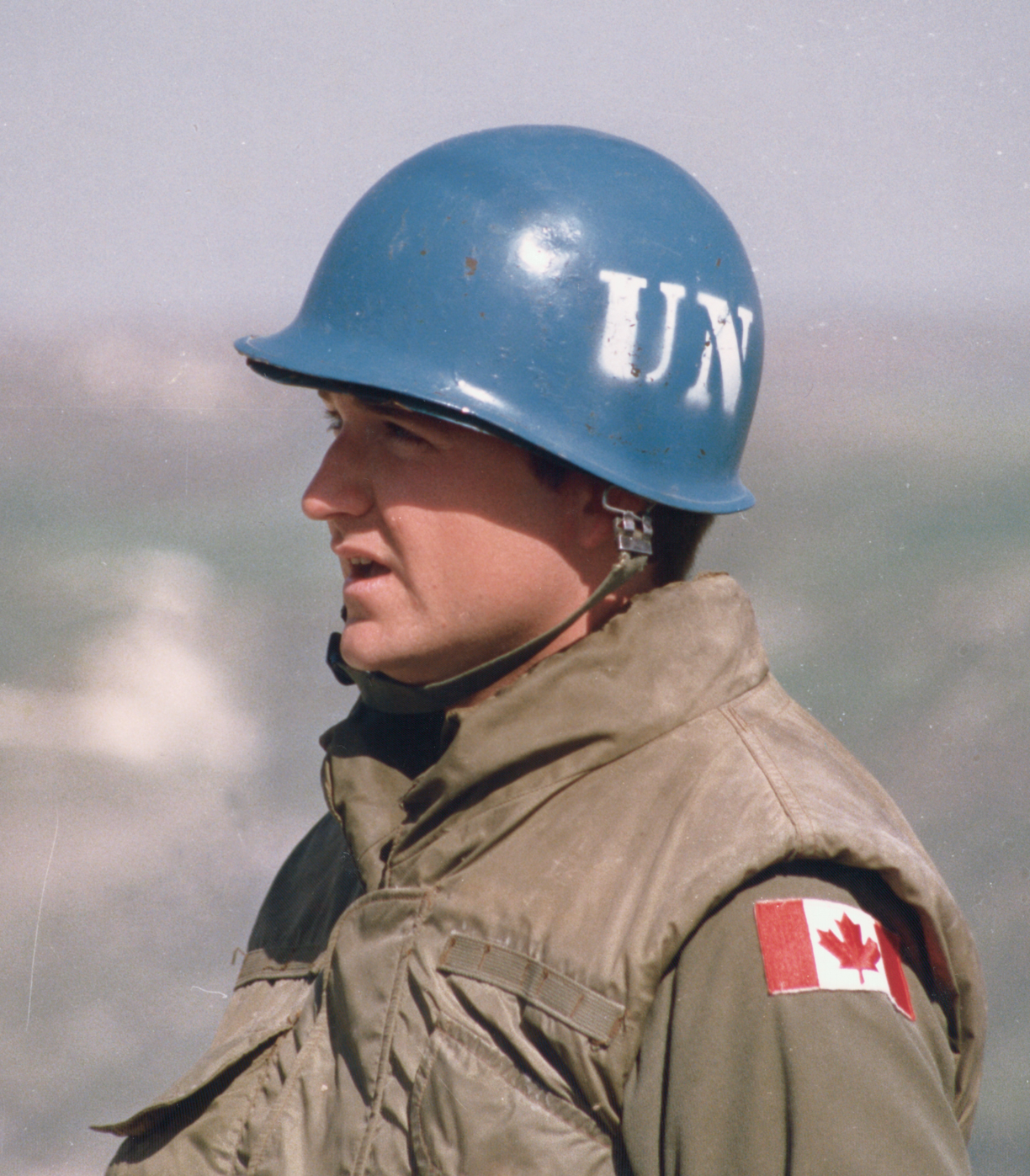
Canadian peacekeeper in 1976 wearing the distinctive flag of Canada and UN blue helmet

The notion of peacekeeping is deeply embedded in Canadian culture and a distinguishing feature that Canadians feel sets their foreign policy apart from its closest ally, the United States. Canada's foreign policy of peacekeeping, peace enforcement, peacemaking, and peacebuilding has been intertwined with its tendency to pursue multilateral and international solutions since the end of World War II.

Canada's central role in the development of peacekeeping in the mid-1950s gave it credibility and established it as a country fighting for the "common good" of all nations. Canada has since been engaged with the United Nations, NATO and the European Union (EU) in promoting its middle power status into an active role in world affairs.

Canada has long been reluctant to participate in military operations that are not sanctioned by the United Nations, such as the Vietnam War or the 2003 Invasion of Iraq. Canada has participated in US-led, UN-sanctioned operations such as the first Gulf War, in Afghanistan and Libya. The country also participates with its NATO allies in UN-sanctioned missions, such as the Kosovo Conflict and in Haiti.

=== Values ===
Canadian values are the perceived commonly shared ethical and human values of Canadians. Canadians generally value freedom and individuality, often making personal decisions based on family interests rather than collective Canadian identity. Tolerance and sensitivity hold significant importance in Canada's multicultural society, as does politeness and fairness Canadians typically tend to embrace liberal views on social and political issues. A majority of Canadians shared the values of human rights, respect for the law and gender equality. Universal access to publicly funded health services "is often considered by Canadians as a fundamental value that ensures national health care insurance for everyone wherever they live in the country."

The major political parties have claimed explicitly that they uphold Canadian values, but use generalities to specify them. Historian Ian MacKay argues that, thanks to the long-term political impact of "Rebels, Reds, and Radicals", and allied leftist political elements, "egalitarianism, social equality, and peace... are now often simply referred to...as 'Canadian values.'"

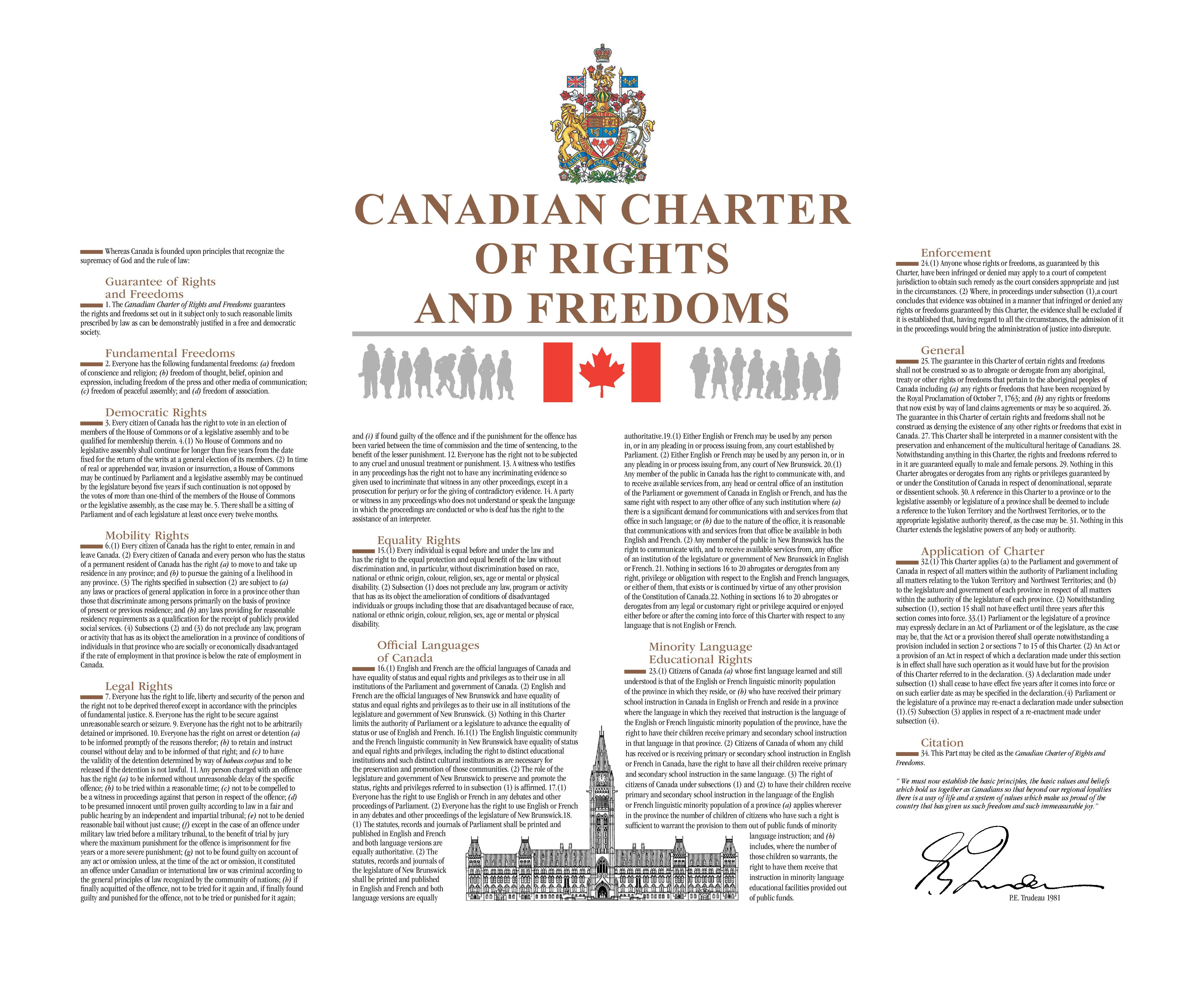
A copy of the Canadian Charter of Rights and Freedoms

The Canadian Charter of Rights and Freedoms, was intended to be a source for Canadian values and national unity. The 15th Prime Minister Pierre Trudeau wrote in his Memoirs that:

Canada itself could now be defined as a "society where all people are equal and where they share some fundamental values based upon freedom", and that all Canadians could identify with the values of liberty and equality.

Numerous scholars, beginning in the 1940s with American sociologist Seymour Martin Lipset; have tried to identify, measure and compare them with other countries, especially the United States. However, there are critics who say that such a task is practically impossible.

Denis Stairs a professor of political Science at Dalhousie University; links the concept of Canadian values with nationalism. [Canadians typically]...believe, in particular, that they subscribe to a distinctive set of values – Canadian values – and that those values are special in the sense of being unusually virtuous.

=== Identity ===
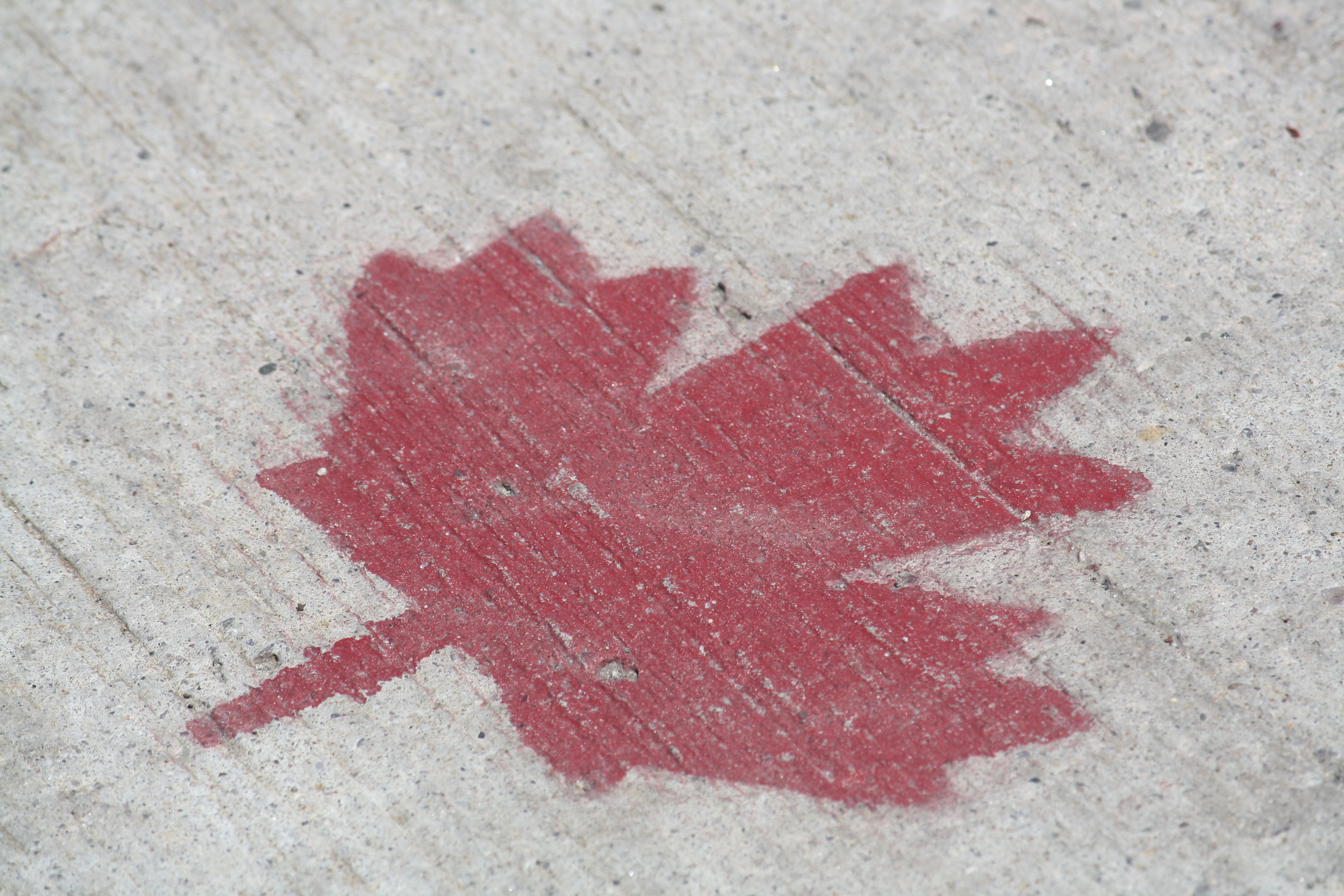
The maple leaf is the symbol most associated with Canadian identity.

Canada's large geographic size, the presence of a significant number of indigenous peoples, the conquest of one European linguistic population by another and relatively open immigration policy have led to an extremely diverse society. As a result, the issue of Canadian identity remains under scrutiny.

Canada has constitutional protection for policies that promote multiculturalism rather than cultural assimilation or a single national myth. In Quebec, cultural identity is strong, and many commentators speak of a French Canadian culture as distinguished from English Canadian culture. However, as a whole, Canada is in theory, a cultural mosaic—a collection of several regional, and ethnic subcultures.

As Professor Alan Cairns noted about the Canadian Charter of Rights and Freedoms , "the initial federal government premise was on developing a pan-Canadian identity"'. Pierre Trudeau himself later wrote in his Memoirs (1993) that "Canada itself" could now be defined as a "society where all people are equal and where they share some fundamental values based upon freedom", and that all Canadians could identify with the values of liberty and equality.

Political philosopher Charles Blattberg suggests that Canada is a "multinational country"; as all Canadians are members of Canada as a civic or political community, a community of citizens, and this is a community that contains many other kinds within it. These include not only communities of ethnic, regional, religious, and civic (the provincial and municipal governments) sorts, but also national communities, which often include or overlap with many of the other kinds.

Journalist and author Richard Gwyn has suggested that "tolerance" has replaced "loyalty" as the touchstone of Canadian identity. Journalist and professor Andrew Cohen wrote in 2007:

The Canadian Identity, as it has come to be known, is as elusive as the Sasquatch and Ogopogo. It has animated—and frustrated—generations of statesmen, historians, writers, artists, philosophers, and the National Film Board ... Canada resists easy definition.

Canada's 15th prime minister Pierre Trudeau in regards to uniformity stated:

Uniformity is neither desirable nor possible in a country the size of Canada. We should not even be able to agree upon the kind of Canadian to choose as a model, let alone persuade most people to emulate it. There are few policies potentially more disastrous for Canada than to tell all Canadians that they must be alike. There is no such thing as a model or ideal Canadian. What could be more absurd than the concept of an "all-Canadian" boy or girl? A society which emphasizes uniformity is one which creates intolerance and hate.

In 2015, Prime Minister Justin Trudeau defined the country as the world's first postnational state: "There is no core identity, no mainstream in Canada".

The question of Canadian identity was traditionally dominated by three fundamental themes: first, the often conflicted relations between English Canadians and French Canadians stemming from the French Canadian imperative for cultural and linguistic survival; secondly, the generally close ties between English Canadians and the British Empire, resulting in a gradual political process towards complete independence from the imperial power; and finally, the close proximity of English-speaking Canadians to the United States. Much of the debate over contemporary Canadian identity is argued in political terms, and defines Canada as a country defined by its government policies, which are thought to reflect deeper cultural values.

In 2013, nearly nine in ten (87%) Canadians were proud to identify as Canadian, with over half (61%) expressing they were very proud. The highest pride levels were for Canadian history (70%), the armed forces (64%), the health care system (64%), and the Constitution (63%). However, pride in Canada’s political influence was lower at 46%. Outside Quebec, pride ranged from 91% in British Columbia to 94% in Prince Edward Island, while 70% of Quebec residents felt proud. Seniors and women showed the most pride, especially among first- and second-generation immigrants, who valued both Canadian identity and achievements.

==== Inter-provincial interactions ====
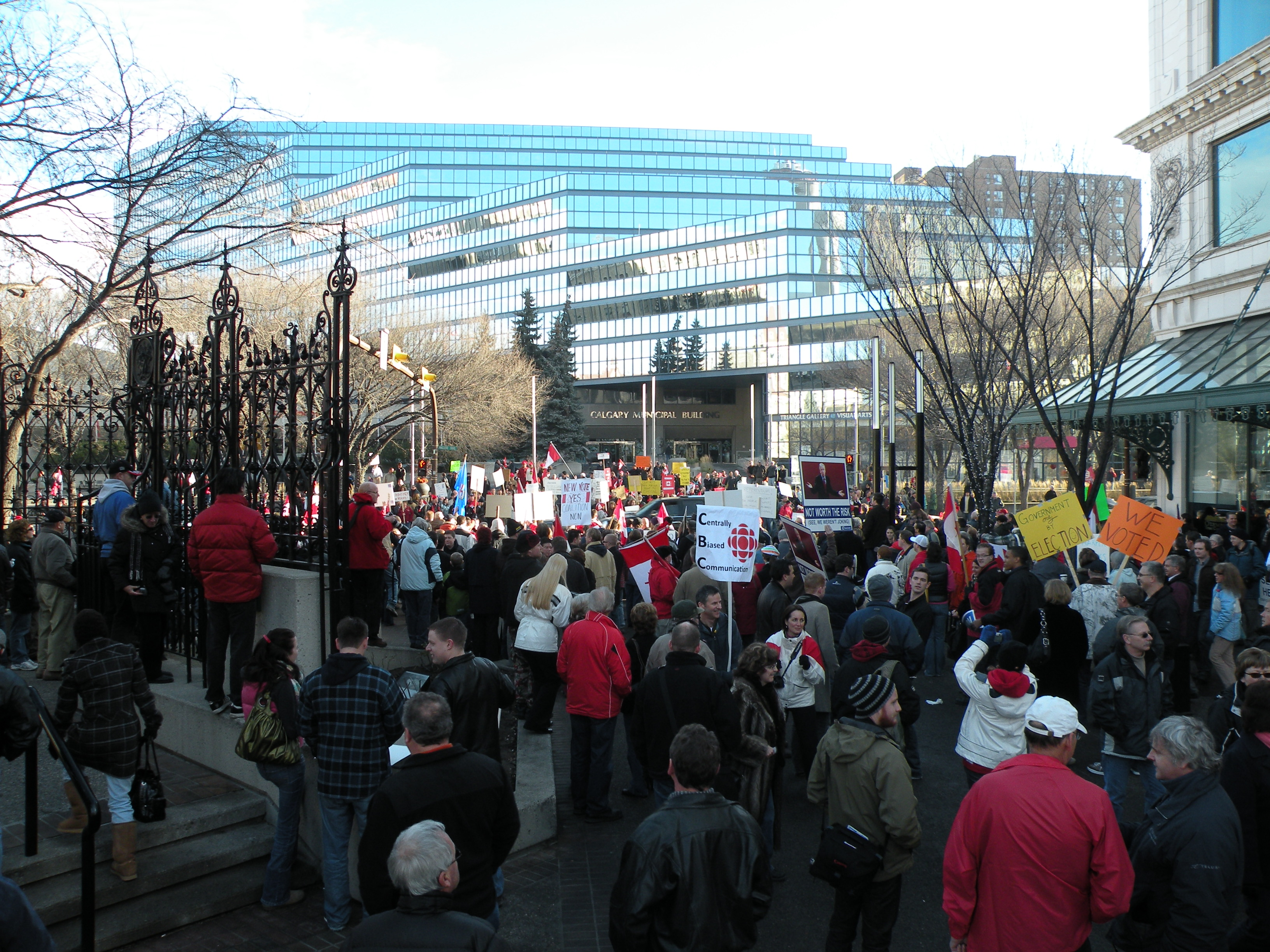
Demonstrators in Calgary, Alberta, protesting the coalition of opposition parties attempting to take control of Parliament during the 2008 Canadian parliamentary dispute

Western alienation is the notion that the western provinces have historically been alienated, and in extreme cases excluded, from mainstream Canadian political affairs in favour of Eastern Canada or more specifically the central provinces. Western alienation claims that these latter two are politically represented, and economically favoured, more significantly than the former, which has given rise to the sentiment of alienation among many western Canadians. Likewise; the Quebec sovereignty movement that lead to the Québécois nation and the province of Quebec being recognized as a "distinct society" within Canada, highlights the sharp divisions between the Anglo and Francophone population.

Though more than half of Canadians live in just two provinces (Ontario and Quebec), each province is largely self-contained due to provincial economic self-sufficiency. Only 15 percent of Canadians live in a different province from where they were born, and only 10 percent go to another province for university. Canada has always been like this, and stands in sharp contrast to the United States' internal mobility which is much higher. For example 30 percent live in a different state from where they were born, and 30 percent go away for university. Scott Gilmore in Maclean's argues that "Canada is a nation of strangers", in the sense that for most individuals, the rest of Canada outside their province is little-known. Another factor is the cost of internal travel. Intra-Canadian airfares are high—it is cheaper and more common to visit the United States than to visit another province. Gilmore argues that the mutual isolation makes it difficult to muster national responses to major national issues.

=== Humour ===
Canadian humour is an integral part of the Canadian Identity. There are several traditions in Canadian humour in both English and French. While these traditions are distinct and at times very different, there are common themes that relate to Canadians' shared history and geopolitical situation in the Western Hemisphere and the world. Various trends can be noted in Canadian comedy. One trend is the portrayal of a "typical" Canadian family in an ongoing radio or television series. Other trends include outright absurdity, and political and cultural satire. Irony, parody, satire, and self-deprecation are arguably the primary characteristics of Canadian humour.

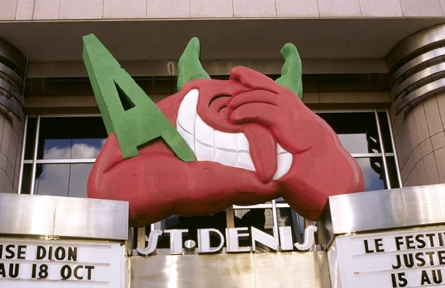
Just for Laughs Festival in Montreal, Québec, at the Saint-Denis Theatre

The beginnings of Canadian national radio comedy date to the late 1930s with the debut of The Happy Gang, a long-running weekly variety show that was regularly sprinkled with corny jokes in between tunes. Canadian television comedy begins with Wayne and Shuster, a sketch comedy duo who performed as a comedy team during the Second World War, and moved their act to radio in 1946 before moving on to television. Second City Television, otherwise known as SCTV, Royal Canadian Air Farce, This Hour Has 22 Minutes, The Kids in the Hall, Trailer Park Boys, Corner Gas and more recently Schitt's Creek are regarded as television shows which were very influential on the development of Canadian humour. Canadian comedians have had great success in the film industry and are amongst the most recognized in the world.

Humber College in Toronto and the École nationale de l'humour in Montreal offer post-secondary programmes in comedy writing and performance. Montreal is also home to the bilingual (English and French) Just for Laughs festival and to the Just for Laughs Museum, a bilingual, international museum of comedy. Canada has a national television channel, The Comedy Network, devoted to comedy. Many Canadian cities feature comedy clubs and showcases, most notable, The Second City branch in Toronto (originally housed at The Old Fire Hall) and the Yuk Yuk's national chain. The Canadian Comedy Awards were founded in 1999 by the Canadian Comedy Foundation for Excellence, a not-for-profit organization.

=== Public holidays ===
Holidays officially observed in Canada are colloquially known as statutory holidays, and are legislated at the federal as well as provincial and territorial levels. Canada's national holiday Dominion Day, later renamed Canada Day, was officially legislated in 1879 under the Dominion Day Act. Labour Day was first legislated in 1894, after various labour organizations petitioned the government. The internationally-recognized New Year's Day, Good Friday, and Christmas Day were traditionally observed in colonial Canada and had been legislated under pre-existing colonial statutes in pre-Confederation Canada, and have been retained to the present day as legal holidays federally and in all provinces and territories, being officially listed in the Canada Labour Code as of 1967 as well as in equivalent legislation across all 13 provinces and territories.

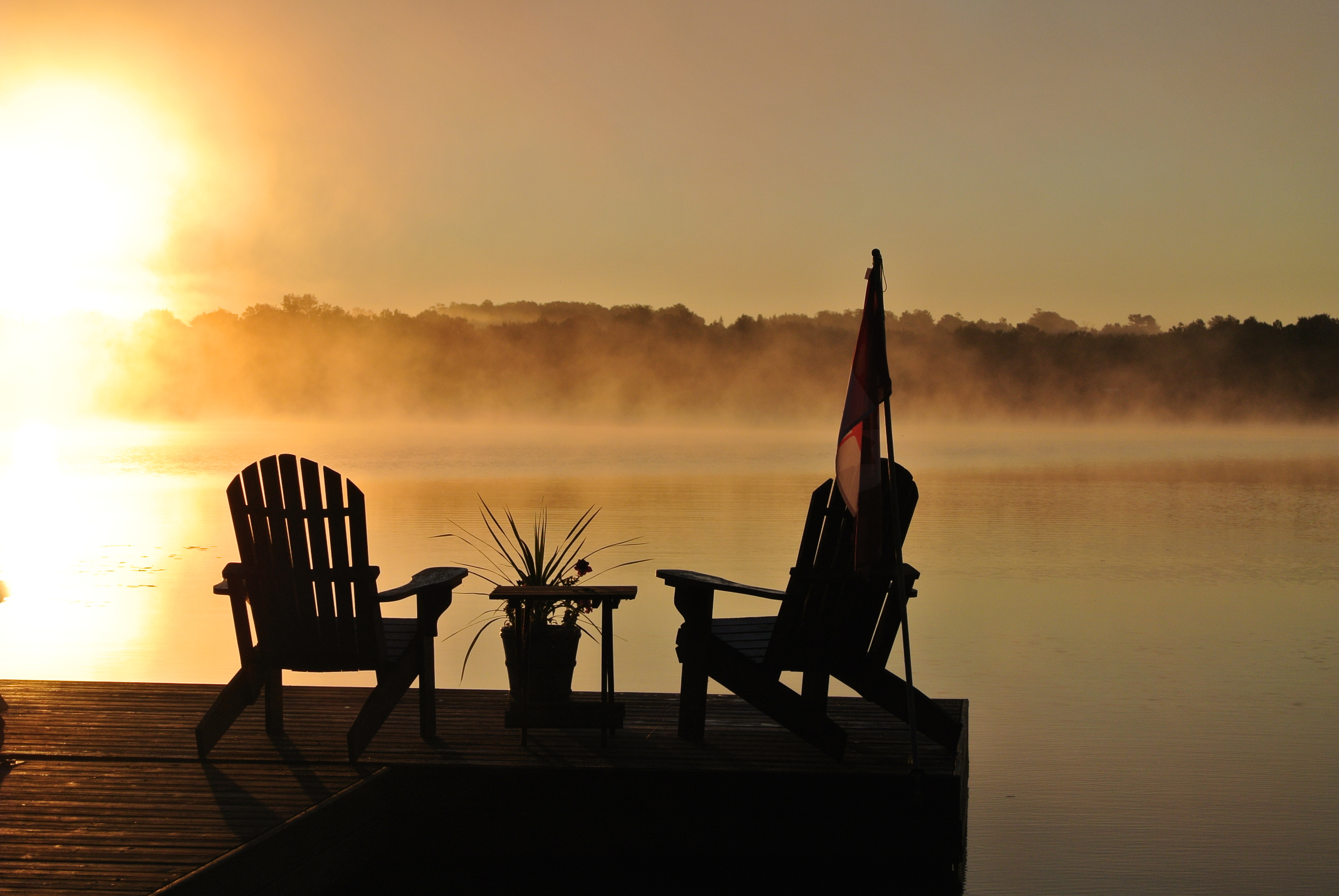
Dock view featuring Muskoka chairs commonly associated with "Canadian cottage culture"

While the above holidays are legislated nationwide, Canada's remaining federal holidays are not observed by all provinces and territories equally, and in their capacity as mandated holidays only apply to the federal government and its workers. These holidays include Easter Monday, Victoria Day, Civic Holiday, Thanksgiving, Remembrance Day, and Boxing Day. Additionally, the most recent federal holiday added is National Day of Truth and Reconciliation, derived from Orange Shirt Day, which was legislated under Bill C-5, the National Day for Truth and Reconciliation Act in June 2021. Due to a lack of statutory holidays between New Year's Day and Good Friday, beginning in the early 1990s and through to the 2010s many provinces have independently added a new holiday on the third Monday in February (coinciding with Presidents' Day in the US), variably called Family Day, Islander Day, Louis Riel Day, and Nova Scotia Heritage Day.

In addition to legislated holidays, many other holidays are publicly celebrated to a significant degree in Canada, including the longstanding Valentine's Day, St. Patrick's Day, Mother's Day, Father's Day and Halloween, as well as increasingly visible observances introduced by minority populations such as Diwali, Eid, and Lunar New Year. The federal government additionally lists various observances that it deems to be "important and commemorative days" as part of the Department of Canadian Heritage, which include Sir John A. Macdonald Day (January 11), the National Flag of Canada Day (February 15), Commonwealth Day (second Monday in March), National Indigenous Peoples Day (June 21), National Acadian Day (August 15), and the Anniversary of the Statute of Westminster (December 11).

== Symbols ==
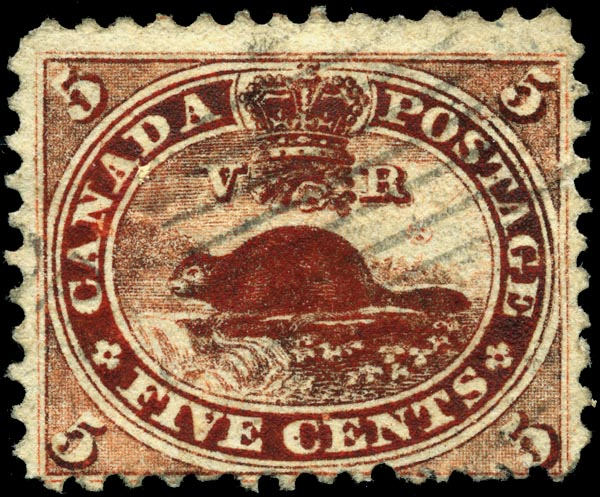
One of the national symbols of Canada, the beaver is depicted on the Canadian five-cent piece and was on the first Canadian postage stamp, c. 1859.

Predominant symbols of Canada include the maple leaf, beaver, and the Canadian horse. Many official symbols of the country such as the Flag of Canada have been changed or modified over the past few decades to Canadianize them and deemphasize or remove references to the United Kingdom. Other prominent symbols include the sports of hockey and lacrosse, the Canada goose, the Royal Canadian Mounted Police, the Canadian Rockies, and more recently the totem pole and Inuksuk; material items such as Canadian beer, maple syrup, tuques, canoes, nanaimo bars, butter tarts and the Quebec dish of poutine have also been defined as uniquely Canadian. Symbols of the Canadian monarchy continue to be featured in, for example, the Arms of Canada, the armed forces, and the prefix His Majesty's Canadian Ship. The designation Royal remains for institutions as varied as the Royal Canadian Armed Forces, Royal Canadian Mounted Police and the Royal Winnipeg Ballet.

== Arts ==
=== Visual arts ===
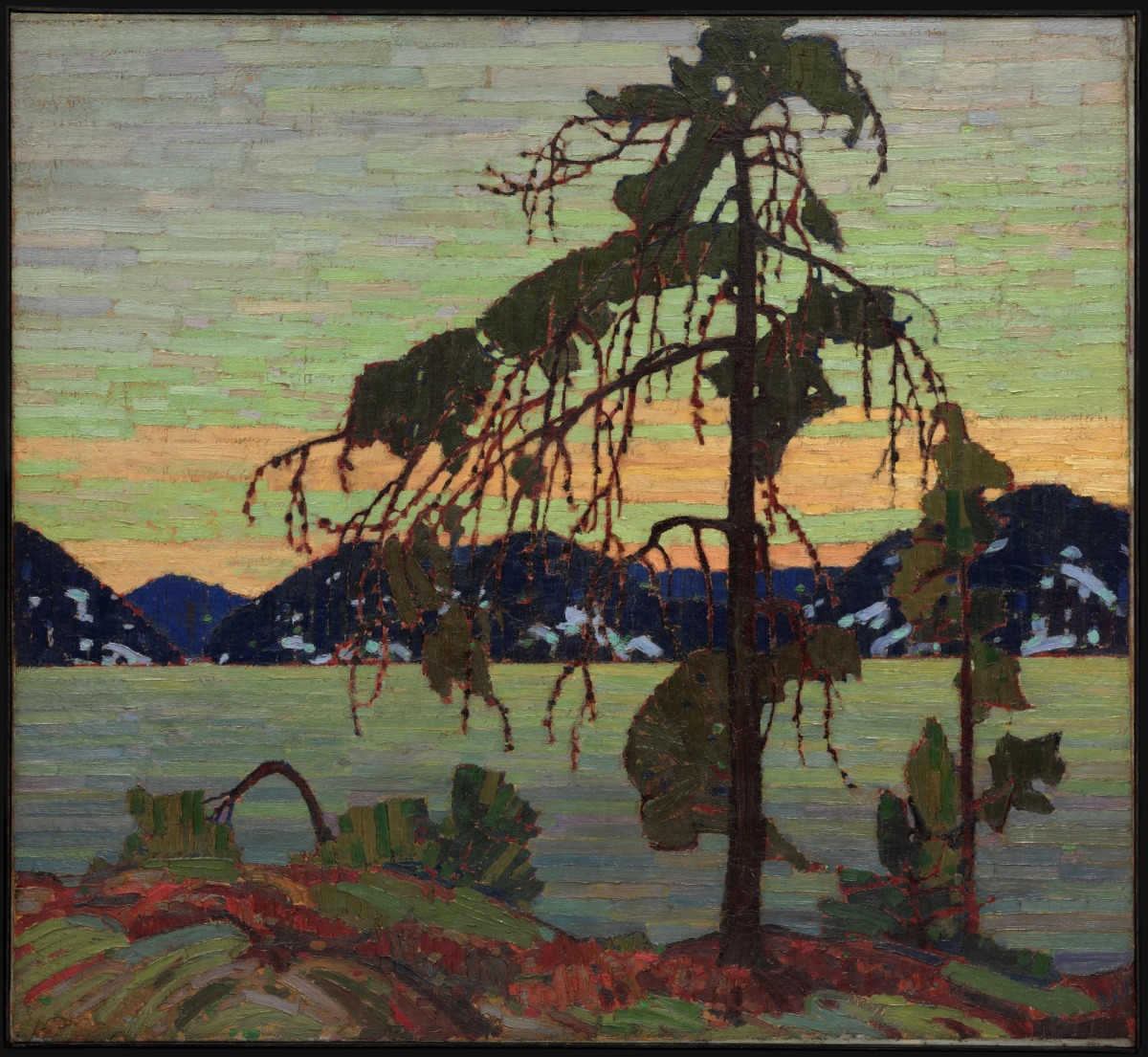
Tom Thomson, The Jack Pine, Winter 1916–17. National Gallery of Canada, Ottawa.

Indigenous artists were producing art in the territory that is now called Canada for thousands of years prior to the arrival of European settler colonists and the eventual establishment of Canada as a nation state. Like the peoples that produced them, indigenous art traditions spanned territories that extended across the current national boundaries between Canada and the United States. The majority of indigenous artworks preserved in museum collections date from the period after European contact and show evidence of the creative adoption and adaptation of European trade goods such as metal and glass beads. Canadian sculpture has been enriched by the walrus ivory, muskox horn and caribou antler and soapstone carvings by the Inuit artists. These carvings show objects and activities from the daily life, myths and legends of the Inuit. Inuit art since the 1950s has been the traditional gift given to foreign dignitaries by the Canadian government.

The works of most early Canadian painters followed European trends. During the mid-19th century, Cornelius Krieghoff, a Dutch-born artist in Quebec, painted scenes of the life of the habitants (French-Canadian farmers). At about the same time, the Canadian artist Paul Kane painted pictures of indigenous life in western Canada. A group of landscape painters called the Group of Seven developed the first distinctly Canadian style of painting, inspired by the works of the legendary landscape painter Tom Thomson. All these artists painted large, brilliantly coloured scenes of the Canadian wilderness.

Since the 1930s, Canadian painters have developed a wide range of highly individual styles. Emily Carr became famous for her paintings of totem poles in British Columbia. Other noted painters have included the landscape artist David Milne, the painters Jean-Paul Riopelle, Harold Town and Charles Carson and multi-media artist Michael Snow. The abstract art group Painters Eleven, particularly the artists William Ronald and Jack Bush, also had an important impact on modern art in Canada. Government support has played a vital role in their development enabling visual exposure through publications and periodicals featuring Canadian art, as has the establishment of numerous art schools and colleges across the country.

=== Literature ===
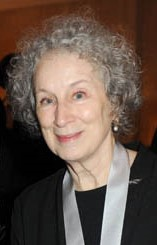
Margaret Atwood is a Canadian poet, novelist, literary critic, essayist, inventor, teacher, and environmental activist.

Canadian literature is often divided into French- and English-language literatures, which are rooted in the literary traditions of France and Britain, respectively. Canada's early literature, whether written in English or French, often reflects the Canadian perspective on nature, frontier life, and Canada's position in the world, for example the poetry of Bliss Carman or the memoirs of Susanna Moodie and Catherine Parr Traill. These themes, and Canada's literary history, inform the writing of successive generations of Canadian authors, from Leonard Cohen to Margaret Atwood.

By the mid-20th century, Canadian writers were exploring national themes for Canadian readers. Authors were trying to find a distinctly Canadian voice, rather than merely emulating British or American writers. Canadian identity is closely tied to its literature. The question of national identity recurs as a theme in much of Canada's literature, from Hugh MacLennan's Two Solitudes (1945) to Alistair MacLeod's No Great Mischief (1999). Canadian literature is often categorized by region or province; by the socio-cultural origins of the author (for example, Acadians, indigenous peoples, LGBT, and Irish Canadians); and by literary period, such as "Canadian postmoderns" or "Canadian Poets Between the Wars".

Canadian authors have accumulated numerous international awards. In 1992, Michael Ondaatje became the first Canadian to win the Booker Prize for The English Patient. Margaret Atwood won the Booker in 2000 for The Blind Assassin and Yann Martel won it in 2002 for the Life of Pi. Carol Shields's The Stone Diaries won the Governor General's Awards in Canada in 1993, the 1995 Pulitzer Prize for Fiction, and the 1994 National Book Critics Circle Award. In 2013, Alice Munro was the first Canadian to be awarded the Nobel Prize in Literature for her work as "master of the modern short story". Munro is also a recipient of the Man Booker International Prize for her lifetime body of work, and three-time winner of Canada's Governor General's Award for fiction.

=== Theatre ===
Canada has had a thriving stage theatre scene since the late 1800s. Theatre festivals draw many tourists in the summer months, especially the Stratford Shakespeare Festival in Stratford, Ontario, and the Shaw Festival in Niagara-on-the-Lake, Ontario. The Famous People Players are only one of many touring companies that have also developed an international reputation. Canada also hosts one of the largest fringe festivals, the Edmonton International Fringe Festival.

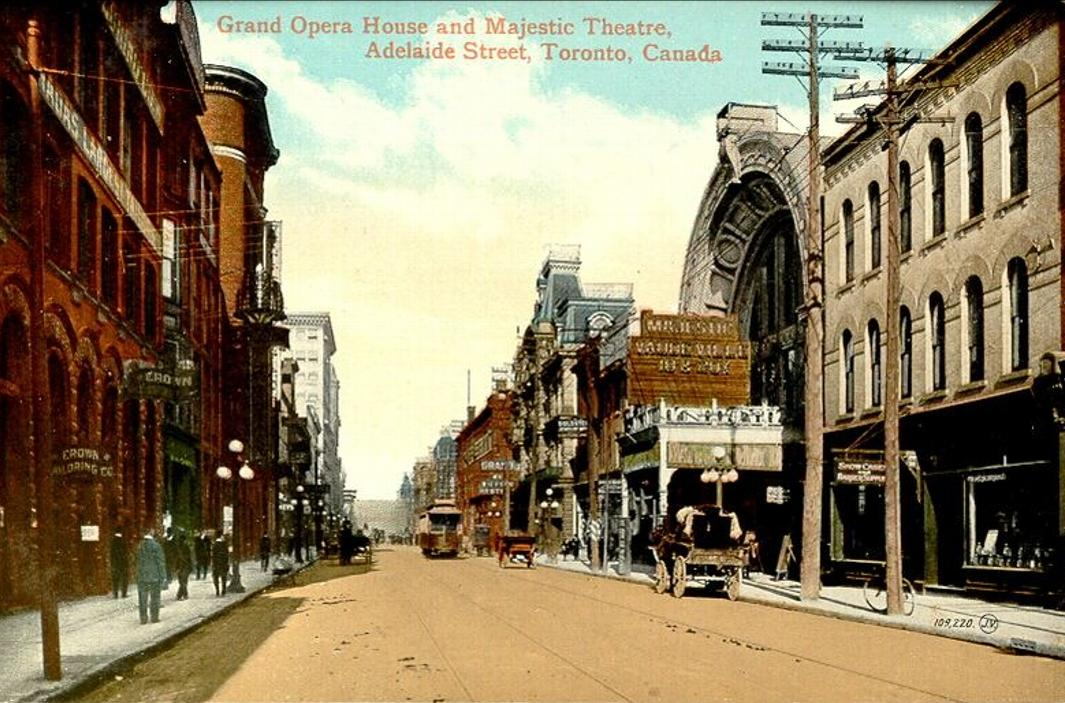
A 1904 postcard showing the Grand Opera House and Majestic Theatre, Adelaide Street, in the current Toronto Theatre District

Canada's largest cities host a variety of modern and historical venues. The Toronto Theatre District is Canada's largest, as well as being the third largest English-speaking theatre district in the world. In addition to original Canadian works, shows from the West End and Broadway frequently tour in Toronto. Toronto's Theatre District includes the venerable Roy Thomson Hall; the Princess of Wales Theatre; the Tim Sims Playhouse; The Second City; the Canon Theatre; the Panasonic Theatre; the Royal Alexandra Theatre; historic Massey Hall; and the city's new opera house, the Sony Centre for the Performing Arts. Toronto's Theatre District also includes the Theatre Museum Canada.

Montreal's theatre district ("Quartier des Spectacles") is the scene of performances that are mainly French-language, although the city also boasts a lively anglophone theatre scene, such as the Centaur Theatre. Large French theatres in the city include Théâtre Saint-Denis and Théâtre du Nouveau Monde.

Vancouver is host to, among others, the Vancouver Fringe Festival, the Arts Club Theatre Company, Carousel Theatre, Bard on the Beach, Theatre Under the Stars and Studio 58.

Calgary is home to Theatre Calgary, a mainstream regional theatre; Alberta Theatre Projects, a major centre for new play development in Canada; the Calgary Animated Objects Society; and One Yellow Rabbit, a touring company.

There are three major theatre venues in Ottawa; the Ottawa Little Theatre, originally called the Ottawa Drama League at its inception in 1913, is the longest-running community theatre company in Ottawa. Since 1969, Ottawa has been the home of the National Arts Centre, a major performing-arts venue that houses four stages and is home to the National Arts Centre Orchestra, the Ottawa Symphony Orchestra and Opera Lyra Ottawa. Established in 1975, the Great Canadian Theatre Company specializes in the production of Canadian plays at a local level.

=== Television ===
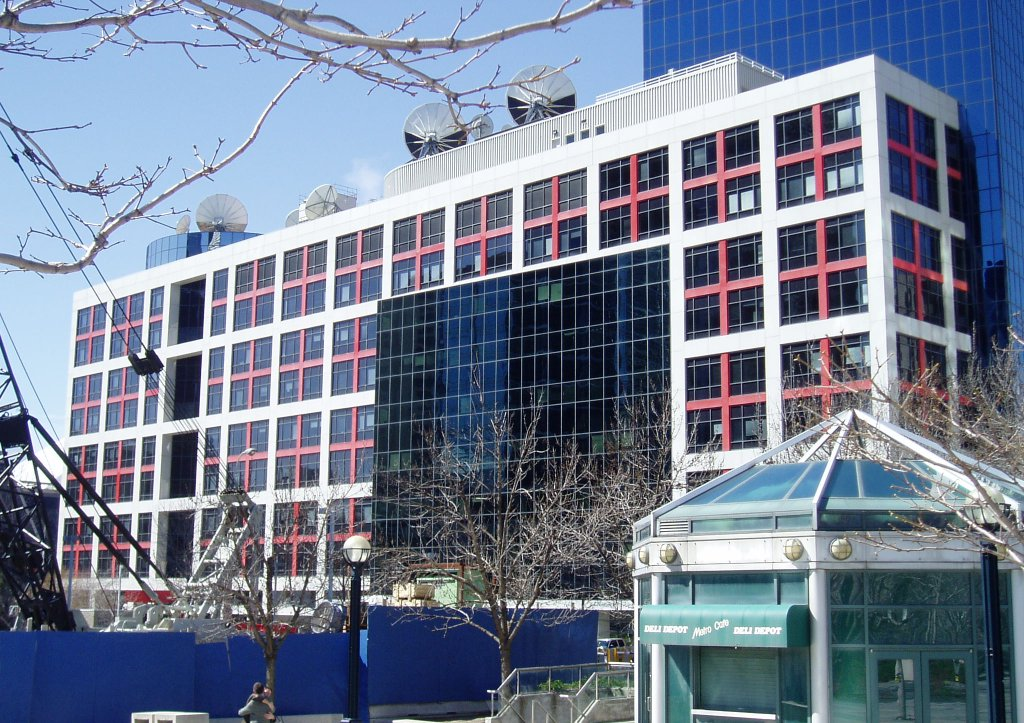
CBC's English-language master control point, the Canadian Broadcasting Centre, in Toronto

Canadian television, especially supported by the Canadian Broadcasting Corporation, is the home of a variety of locally produced shows. French-language television, like French Canadian film, is buffered from excessive American influence by the fact of language, and likewise supports a host of home-grown productions. The success of French-language domestic television in Canada often exceeds that of its English-language counterpart. In recent years nationalism has been used to prompt products on television. The I Am Canadian campaign by Molson beer, most notably the commercial featuring Joe Canadian, infused domestically brewed beer and nationalism.

Canada's television industry is in full expansion as a site for Hollywood productions. Since the 1980s, Canada, and Vancouver in particular, has become known as Hollywood North. The American TV series Queer as Folk was filmed in Toronto. Canadian producers have been very successful in the field of science fiction since the mid-1990s, with such shows as The X-Files, Stargate SG-1, Highlander: The Series, the new Battlestar Galactica, My Babysitter's a Vampire, Smallville, and The Outer Limits all filmed in Vancouver.

The CRTC's Canadian content regulations dictate that a certain percentage of a domestic broadcaster's transmission time must include content that is produced by Canadians, or covers Canadian subjects. These regulations also apply to US cable television channels such as MTV and the Discovery Channel, which have local versions of their channels available on Canadian cable networks. Similarly, BBC Canada, while showing primarily BBC shows from the United Kingdom, also carries Canadian output.

=== Film ===
A number of Canadian pioneers in early Hollywood significantly contributed to the creation of the motion picture industry in the early days of the 20th century. Over the years, many Canadians have made enormous contributions to the American entertainment industry, although they are frequently not recognized as Canadians.

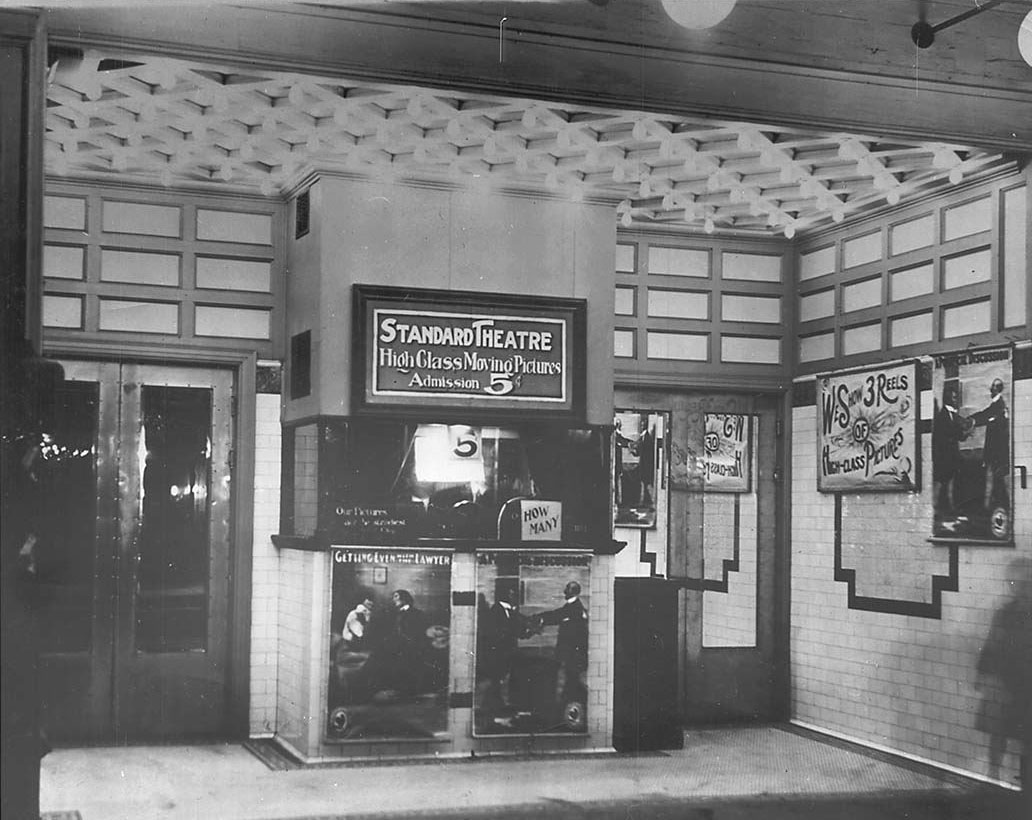
Standard Theatre, 482 Queen Street West, Toronto, 1906

Canada has developed a film industry that has produced a variety of well-known films and actors. This has been credited for the directions of some works, such as auteurs Atom Egoyan (The Sweet Hereafter, 1997) and David Cronenberg (The Fly, Naked Lunch, A History of Violence) and the avant-garde work of Michael Snow and Jack Chambers. The distinct French-Canadian society permits the work of directors such as Denys Arcand and Denis Villeneuve, while First Nations cinema includes Atanarjuat: The Fast Runner. At the 76th Academy Awards, Arcand's The Barbarian Invasions became Canada's first film to win the Academy Award for Best Foreign Language Film.

The National Film Board of Canada is a public agency that produces and distributes films and other audiovisual works which reflect Canada to Canadians and the rest of the world'. Canada has produced many popular documentaries such as The Corporation, Nanook of the North, Final Offer, and Canada: A People's History. The Toronto International Film Festival (TIFF) is considered by many to be one of the most prevalent film festivals for Western cinema. It is the première film festival in North America from which the Oscars race begins.

=== Music ===
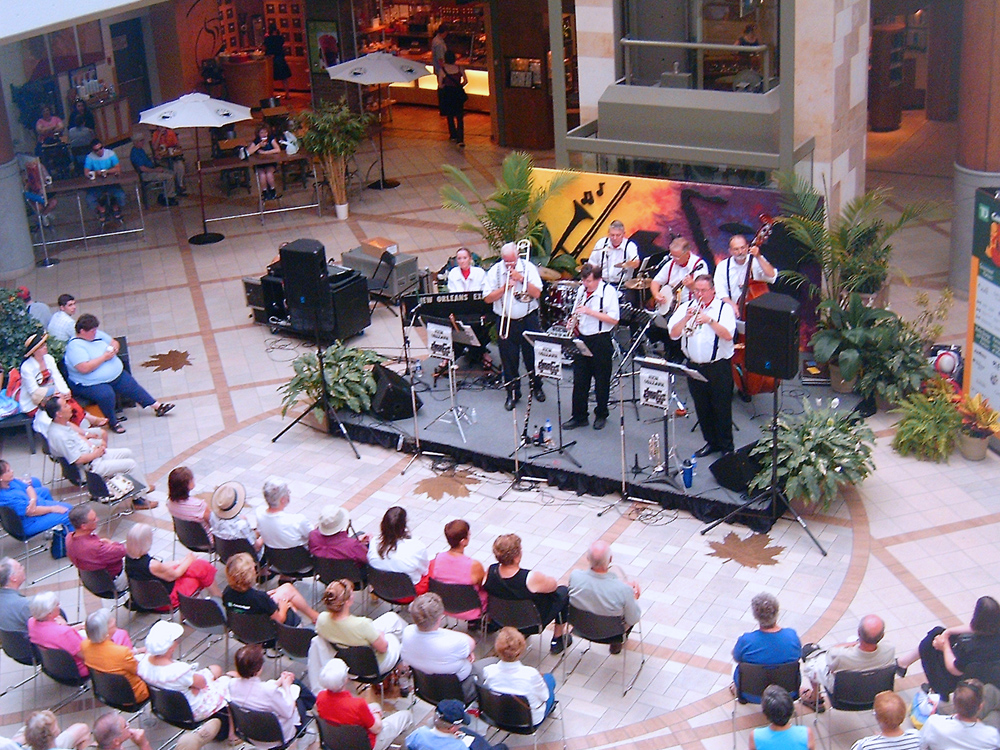
Ottawa Jazz Festival inside Rideau Centre, 2008

The music of Canada has reflected the multi-cultural influences that have shaped the country. Indigenous, the French, and the British have all made historical contributions to the musical heritage of Canada. The country has produced its own composers, musicians and ensembles since the mid-1600s. From the 17th century onward, Canada has developed a music infrastructure that includes church halls; chamber halls; conservatories; academies; performing arts centres; record companies; radio stations, and television music-video channels. The music has subsequently been heavily influenced by American culture because of its proximity and migration between the two countries. Canadian rock has had a considerable impact on the development of modern popular music and the development of the most popular subgenres.

Patriotic music in Canada dates back over 200 years as a distinct category from British patriotism, preceding the first legal steps to independence by over 50 years. The earliest known song, "The Bold Canadian", was written in 1812. The national anthem of Canada, "O Canada" adopted in 1980, was originally commissioned by the Lieutenant Governor of Quebec, the Honourable Théodore Robitaille, for the 1880 Saint-Jean-Baptiste Day ceremony. Calixa Lavallée wrote the music, which was a setting of a patriotic poem composed by the poet and judge Sir Adolphe-Basile Routhier. The text was originally only in French, before English lyrics were written in 1906.

Music broadcasting in the country is regulated by the Canadian Radio-television and Telecommunications Commission (CRTC). The Canadian Academy of Recording Arts and Sciences presents Canada's music industry awards, the Juno Awards, which were first awarded in a ceremony during the summer of 1970.

== Media ==
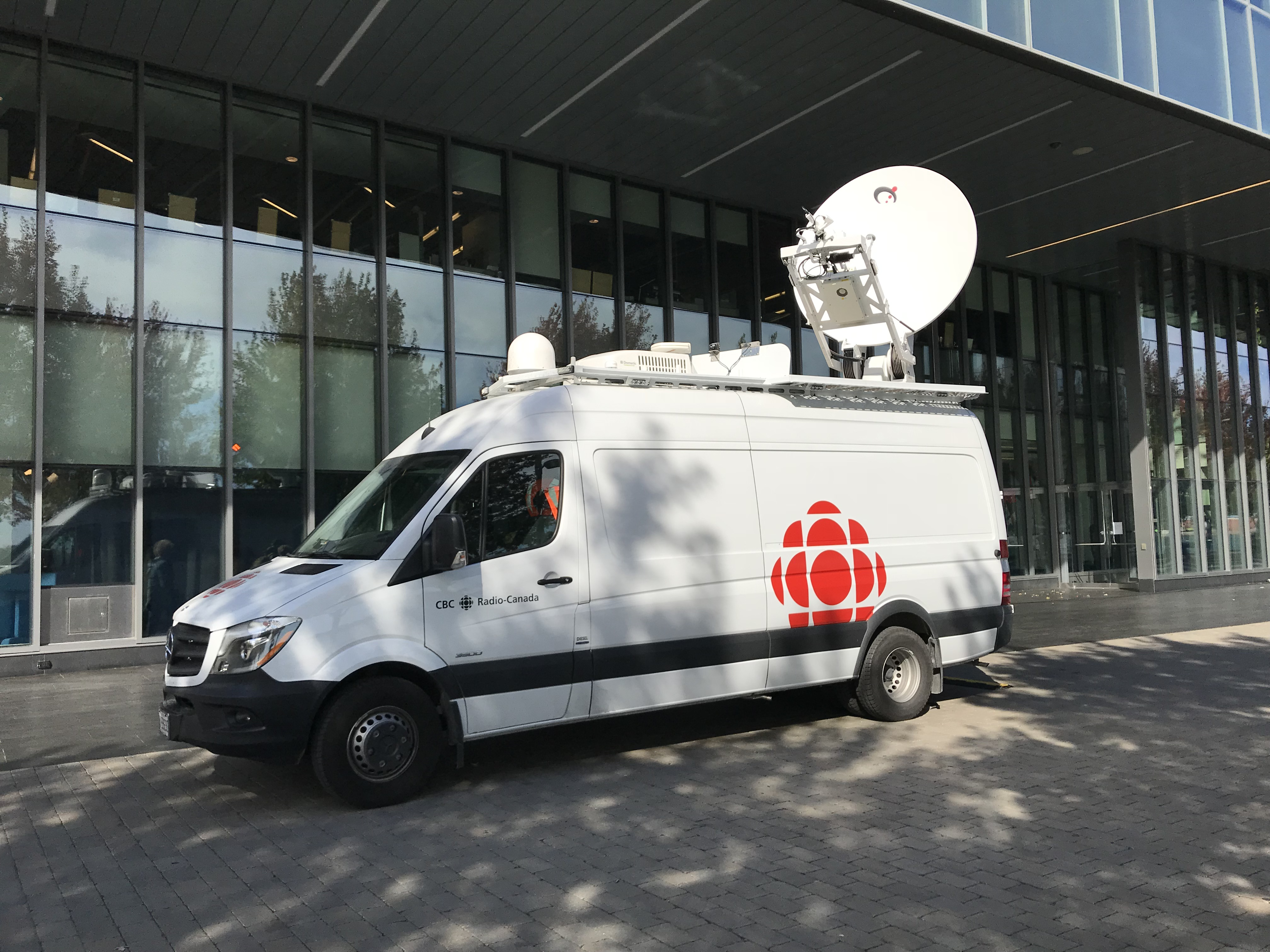
A Canadian Broadcasting Corporation (CBC) satellite truck, used for live television broadcasts

Canada's media is highly autonomous, uncensored, diverse, and very regionalized. The Broadcasting Act declares "the system should serve to safeguard, enrich, and strengthen the cultural, political, social, and economic fabric of Canada". Canada has a well-developed media sector, but its cultural output—particularly in English films, television shows, and magazines—is often overshadowed by imports from the United States and the United Kingdom. As a result, the preservation of a distinctly Canadian culture is supported by federal government programs, laws, and institutions such as the Canadian Broadcasting Corporation (CBC), the National Film Board of Canada (NFB), and the Canadian Radio-television and Telecommunications Commission (CRTC).

Canadian mass media, both print and digital, and in both official languages, is largely dominated by a "handful of corporations". The largest of these corporations is the country's national public broadcaster, the Canadian Broadcasting Corporation, which also plays a significant role in producing domestic cultural content, operating its own radio and TV networks in both English and French. In addition to the CBC, some provincial governments offer their own public educational TV broadcast services as well, such as TVOntario and Télé-Québec.

Non-news media content in Canada, including film and television, is influenced both by local creators as well as by imports from the United States, the United Kingdom, Australia, and France. In an effort to reduce the amount of foreign-made media, government interventions in television broadcasting can include both regulation of content and public financing. Canadian tax laws limit foreign competition in magazine advertising.

== Sports ==
Sports in Canada consists of a variety of games. Although there are many contests that Canadians value, the most common are ice hockey, box lacrosse, Canadian football, basketball, soccer, curling and ringette. All but curling and soccer are considered domestic sports as they were either invented by Canadians or trace their roots to Canada.

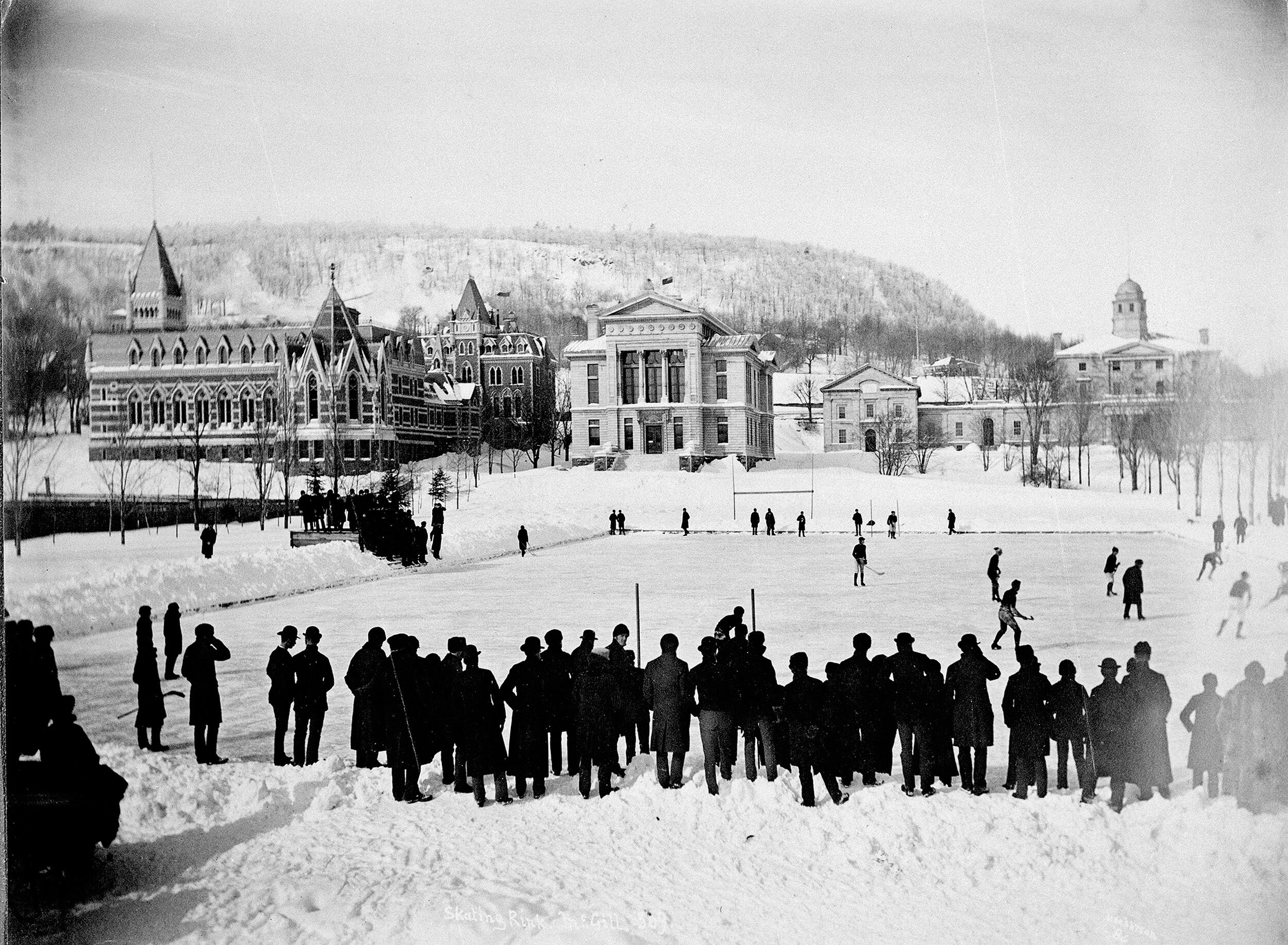
Ice hockey being played at McGill University, in Montreal, 1884

Ice hockey, referred to as simply "hockey", is Canada's most prevalent winter sport, its most popular spectator sport, and its most successful sport in international competition. It is Canada's official national winter sport. Lacrosse, a sport with indigenous origins, is Canada's oldest and official summer sport. Canadian football is Canada's second most popular spectator sport, and the Canadian Football League's annual championship, the Grey Cup, is the country's largest annual sports event.

While other sports have a larger spectator base, association football, known in Canada as soccer in both English and French, has the most registered players of any team sport in Canada, and is the most played sport with all demographics, including ethnic origin, ages and genders. Professional teams exist in many cities in Canada – with a trio of teams in North America's top pro league, Major League Soccer – and international soccer competitions such as the FIFA World Cup, UEFA Euro and the UEFA Champions League attract some of the biggest audiences in Canada. Other popular team sports include curling, street hockey, rugby league, rugby union, softball and Ultimate frisbee. Popular individual sports include auto racing, boxing, karate, kickboxing, hunting, sport shooting, fishing, cycling, golf, hiking, horse racing, ice skating, skiing, snowboarding, swimming, triathlon, disc golf, water sports, and several forms of wrestling.

As a country with a generally cool climate, Canada has enjoyed greater success at the Winter Olympics than at the Summer Olympics, although significant regional variations in climate allow for a wide variety of both team and individual sports. Great achievements in Canadian sports are recognized by Canada's Sports Hall of Fame, while the Lou Marsh Trophy is awarded annually to Canada's top athlete by a panel of journalists. There are numerous other Sports Halls of Fame in Canada.

== Cuisine ==
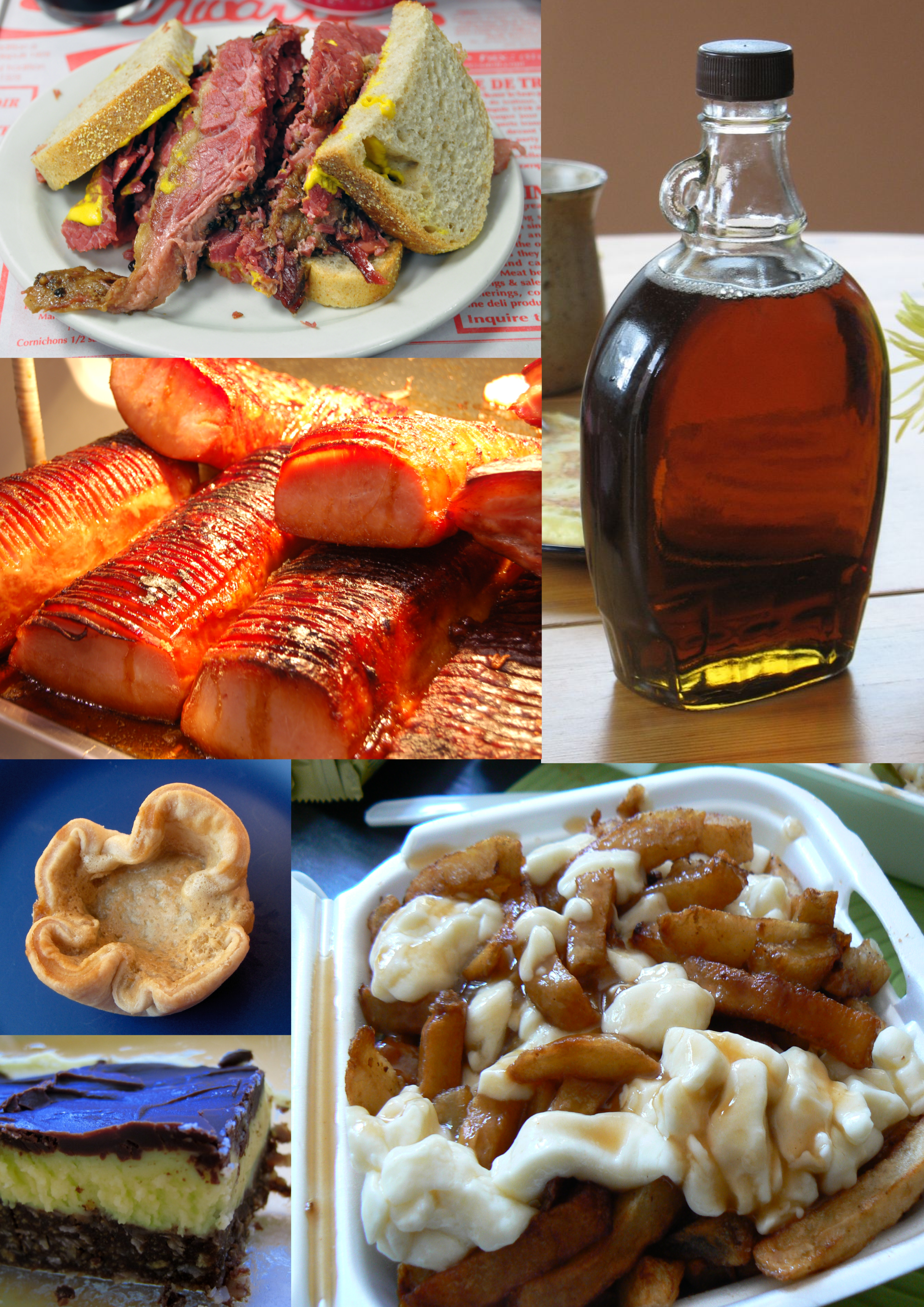
A small sampling of Canadian foods. Clockwise from top left: Montreal-style smoked meat; maple syrup; poutine; Nanaimo bar; butter tart; and peameal bacon.

Canadian cuisine varies widely depending on the region. The former Canadian prime minister Joe Clark has been paraphrased to have noted: "Canada has a cuisine of cuisines. Not a stew pot, but a smorgasbord." While there are considerable overlaps between Canadian food and the rest of the cuisine in North America, many unique dishes (or versions of certain dishes) are found and available only in the country. Common contenders for the Canadian national food include poutine and butter tarts. Other popular Canadian made foods include indigenous fried bread bannock, French tourtière, Kraft Dinner, ketchup chips, date squares, nanaimo bars, back bacon, the caesar cocktail and many many more. The Canadian province of Quebec is the birthplace and world's largest producer of maple syrup, The Montreal-style bagel and Montreal-style smoked meat are both food items originally developed by Jewish communities living in Quebec.

The three earliest cuisines of Canada have First Nations, English, and French roots. The indigenous population of Canada often have their own traditional cuisine. The cuisines of English Canada are closely related to British and American cuisine. Finally, the traditional cuisines of French Canada have evolved from 16th-century French cuisine because of the tough conditions of colonial life and the winter provisions of Coureur des bois. With subsequent waves of immigration in the 18th and 19th century from Central, Southern, and Eastern Europe, and then from Asia, Africa and Caribbean, the regional cuisines were subsequently affected.

== Public opinion data ==
A 2022 web survey by the Association for Canadian Studies found that an absolute majority of respondents in all provinces except Alberta disagreed with the statement that "there is only one Canadian culture". Most respondents didn't choose what music to listen to based on whether or not the artist was Canadian. While half of Quebeckers and more than one third of respondents in the rest of Canada agreed that "I worry about preserving my culture" at the same time 60% of respondents agreed that "If a Canadian artist is good enough, they will become discovered without the need for specific Canadian content rules". Forty-six percent of respondents had no favourite Canadian musical artist. Rock, pop, and country music were the most popular genres of music, with above twenty percent fan bases in all age categories, but with hip-hop also appealing to more than twenty percent in the youngest cohort (18–35 years old). Film genre preferences were largely as the same across age categories, with comedies and action films the most popular, except that only one percent of older people (>55 years old) were fans of animated movies compared to eleven percent in young adults, while older adults showed a strong preference for dramas compared to younger people. Three out of four respondents could not name a single Canadian visual artist, living or dead.

== Outside views ==
In a 2002 interview with the Globe and Mail, Aga Khan, the 49th Imam of the Ismaili Muslims, described Canada as "the most successful pluralist society on the face of our globe", citing it as "a model for the world". A 2007 poll ranked Canada as the country with the most positive influence in the world. 28,000 people in 27 countries were asked to rate 12 countries as either having a positive or negative worldwide influence. Canada's overall influence rating topped the list with 54 per cent of respondents rating it mostly positive and only 14 per cent mostly negative. A global opinion poll for the BBC saw Canada ranked the second most positively viewed nation in the world (behind Germany) in 2013 and 2014.

The United States is home to a number of perceptions about Canadian culture, due to the countries' partially shared heritage and the relatively large number of cultural features common to both the US and Canada. For example, the average Canadian may be perceived as more reserved than his or her American counterpart. Canada and the United States are often inevitably compared as sibling countries, and the perceptions that arise from this oft-held contrast have gone to shape the advertised worldwide identities of both nations: the United States is seen as the rebellious child of the British Crown, forged in the fires of violent revolution; Canada is the calmer offspring of the United Kingdom, known for a more relaxed national demeanour.

== See also ==
- Canadiana
- Canadian folklore
- Inuit culture#Inuit in Canada
- Culture of Quebec
- Acadian culture
- Architecture of Canada
- Freedom of expression in Canada
- Public holidays in Canada
- Canadian French
- Lists of Canadians
