= Leslie H. Neatby =

Canadian academic (1902–1997)

- Born: May 16, 1902; London, England
- Died: May 4, 1997 (aged 94)
- Burial place: Woodlawn Cemetery, Saskatoon
- Relatives: Hilda Neatby (sister), Avard Hudgins (father-in-law)

Academic background
- Education: University of Toronto

Academic work
- Discipline: Classics, History
- Institutions: Acadia University

Leslie Hamilton Neatby (May 16, 1902 – May 4, 1997) was a Canadian professor of Classics and later, a historian of the Arctic. He was the brother of historian Hilda Neatby and the father-in-law of geologist Avard Hudgins.

== Early life ==
Leslie Hamilton Neatby was born in London, England to Andrew Neatby and Ada Fisher, the sixth in a family of eight children. After emigrating to Canada in 1906, his father practised medicine in the village of Earl Grey, Saskatchewan. Two years later, he decided to trade in medicine for homesteading and moved his family, along with 3,000 books, to Renown, a village near Watrous, Saskatchewan. They moved to Saskatoon in 1919, and Leslie obtained his BA from the University of Saskatchewan in 1925, with honors in History and Latin. In February 1934 he married Murdena Stewart (1895–1982) in Shellbrook, Saskatchewan. After working as a schoolteacher, he was awarded an MA in 1939. Following military service overseas with the Canadian army, Neatby resumed his studies and in 1950 obtained a PhD in classics from the University of Toronto, at the age of 48.

== Career and legacy ==
From 1951 to 1967, Neatby was Head of the Department of Classics at Acadia University in Wolfville, Nova Scotia. He developed an interest in the history of Arctic exploration, and the first of his many books on the topic was published in 1958. He left Acadia University at age 65 and returned to the University of Saskatchewan until his retirement in 1970. He thereupon worked as Historical Associate at the Institute for Northern Studies at the University of Saskatchewan until 1982.

In recognition of his contribution to the history of the Arctic, Neatby was awarded an honorary doctorate by his alma mater in 1974. He died in 1997 and is buried next to his wife, Murdena, in Saskatoon's Woodlawn Cemetery.

== Works ==
- In Quest of the North West Passage (Toronto: Longmans, Green and Co.,1958)
- The Link Between the Oceans (Toronto: Longmans, Green and Co., 1960)
- Conquest of the Last Frontier (Athens OH: Ohio University Press, 1966)
- Frozen Ships: The Arctic Diary of Johann Miertsching 1850-1854 (Toronto: Macmillan of Canada, 1967)
- The Search for Franklin (London: Arthur Barker Ltd., 1970)
- Discovery in Russian and Siberian Waters (Athens OH: Ohio University Press, 1973)
- My Life Among the Eskimos; Baffinland Journeys in the Years 1909 to 1911 (Saskatoon SK, University of Saskatchewan, 1977)
- Chronicle of a Pioneer Prairie Family (Saskatoon SK: Western Producer Prairie Books, 1979)
