= Toronto Theatre District =

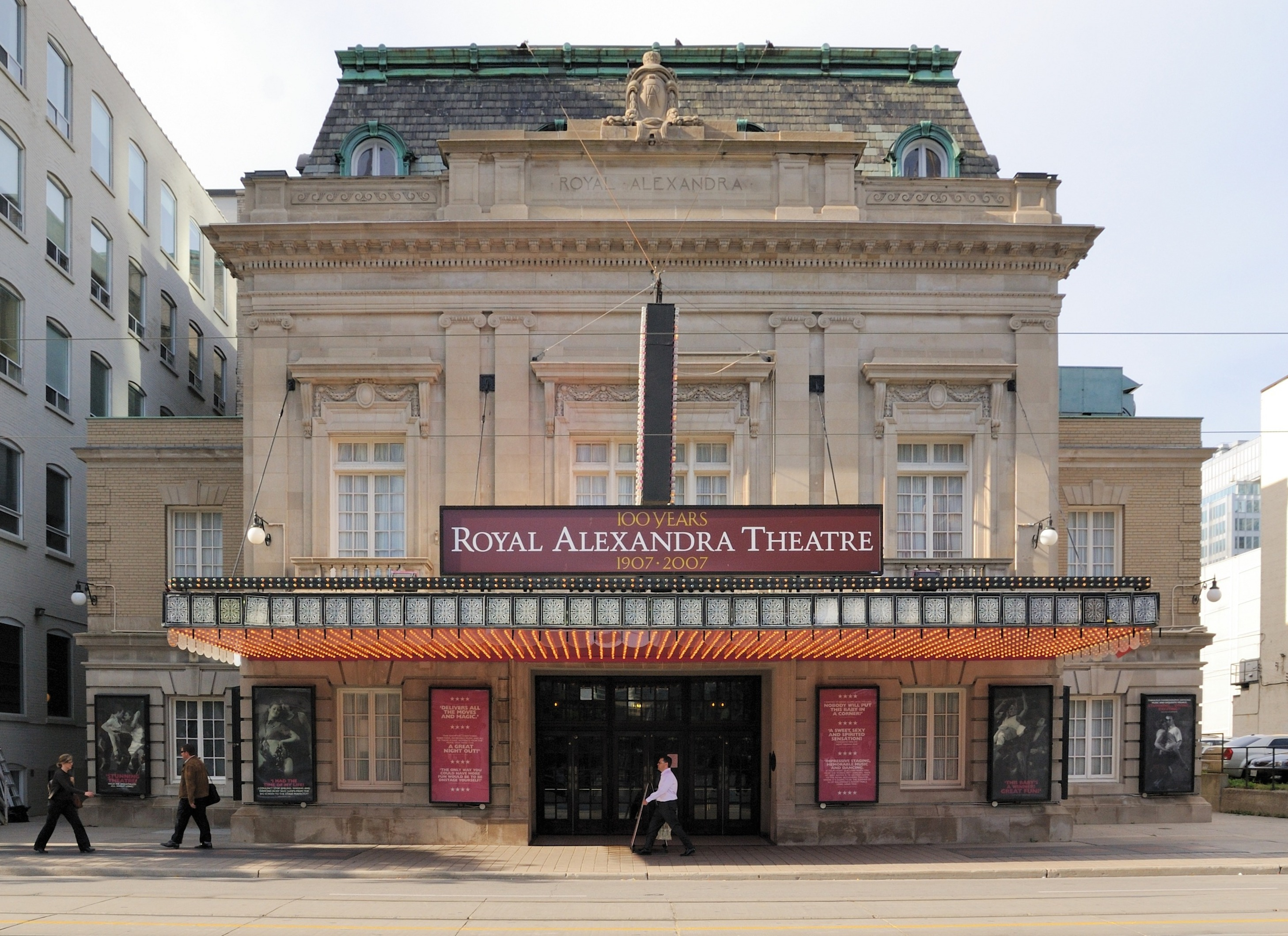
The Royal Alexandra Theatre, Toronto, built in 1907.

The Toronto Theatre District is a part of the Toronto Entertainment District in Downtown Toronto that contains the largest concentration of stage theatres in Canada. It is the third largest English-speaking theatre district in the world, after West End in London and Broadway in New York City.

Most of the theatre district is bounded by Adelaide Street in the north, University Avenue in the east, King Street West in the south, and Bathurst Street in the west. Some notable historic theatres are located beyond these boundaries, for example Tarragon Theatre. Toronto's theatre scene is predominantly clustered in a central area, but expands as far north as Bloor Street, south to the harbour front, and as far east as the Don River.

Large touring Broadway and West End productions come to Toronto regularly. The city also hosts several theatre festivals each year. The annual Shaw Festival in Niagara-on-the-Lake celebrates the works of Irish playwright George Bernard Shaw. The Toronto Fringe Festival promotes uncensored original works at numerous small venues. Summerworks is the largest juried theatre festival in Canada, focusing on small theatre productions as well as a music concert series and art exhibits.

== Theatres ==
Toronto's theatre district includes many landmark theatres, such as:

- Bluma Appel Theatre, St. Lawrence Centre for the Arts
- Buddies in Bad Times Theatre
- Canadian Stage Company (theatre on Berkeley Street, outdoor amphitheatre at High Park)
- Factory Theatre
- Lorraine Kimsa Theatre for Young People
- Princess of Wales Theatre
- Royal Alexandra Theatre
- Roy Thomson Hall
- The Second City
- Tim Sims Playhouse
- Tarragon Theatre
- Theatre Passe Muraille
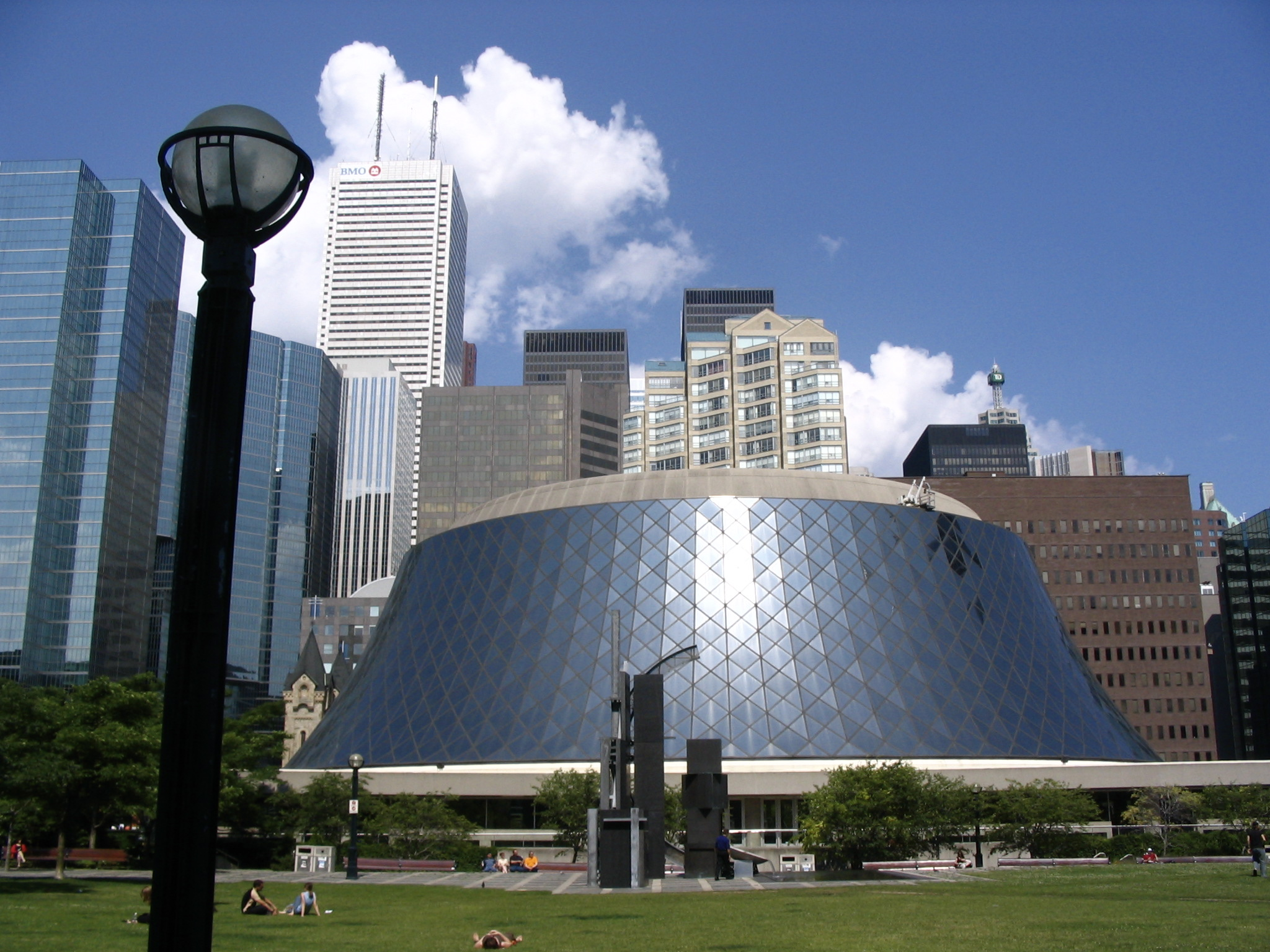
Roy Thomson Hall.

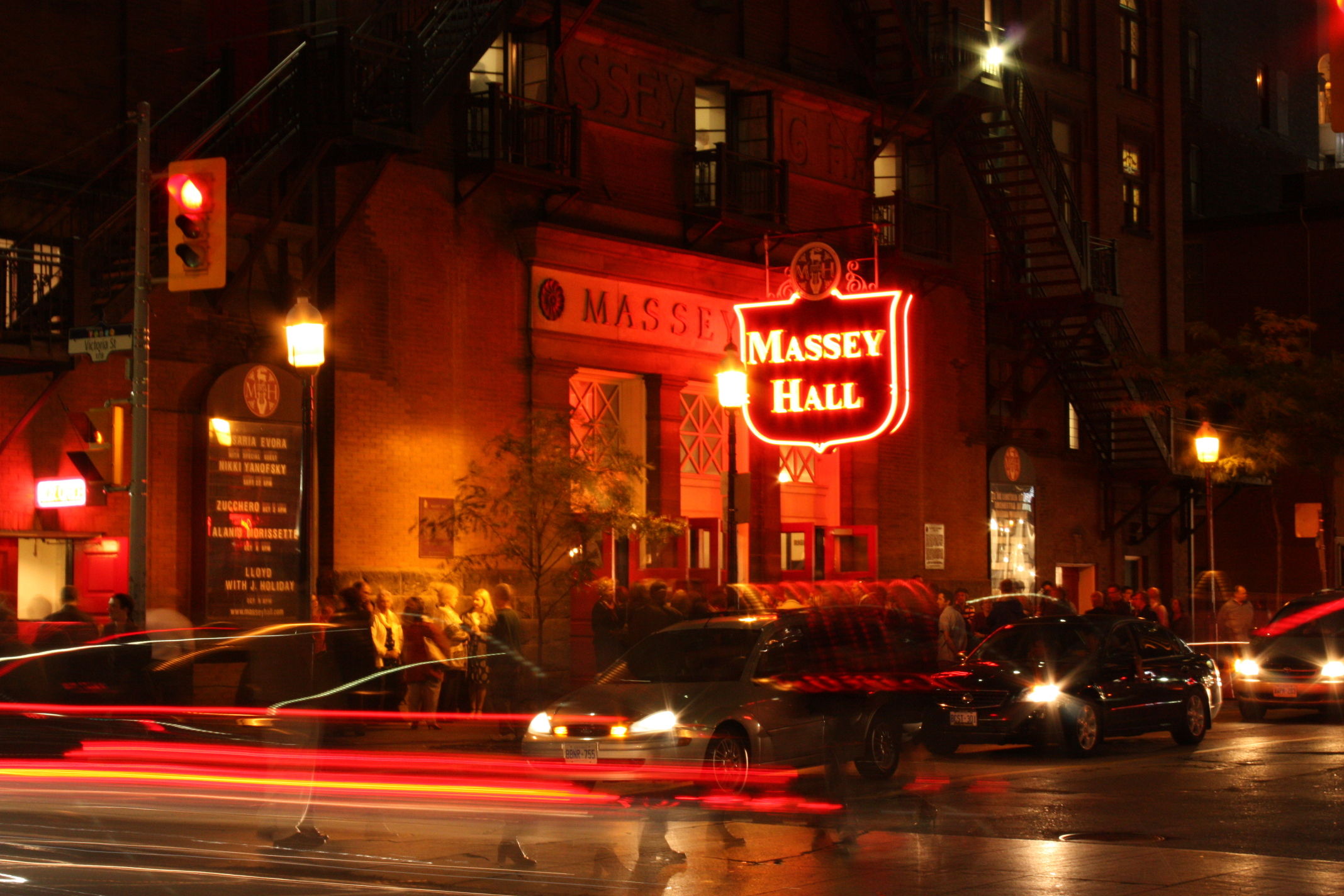
Massey Hall at night.

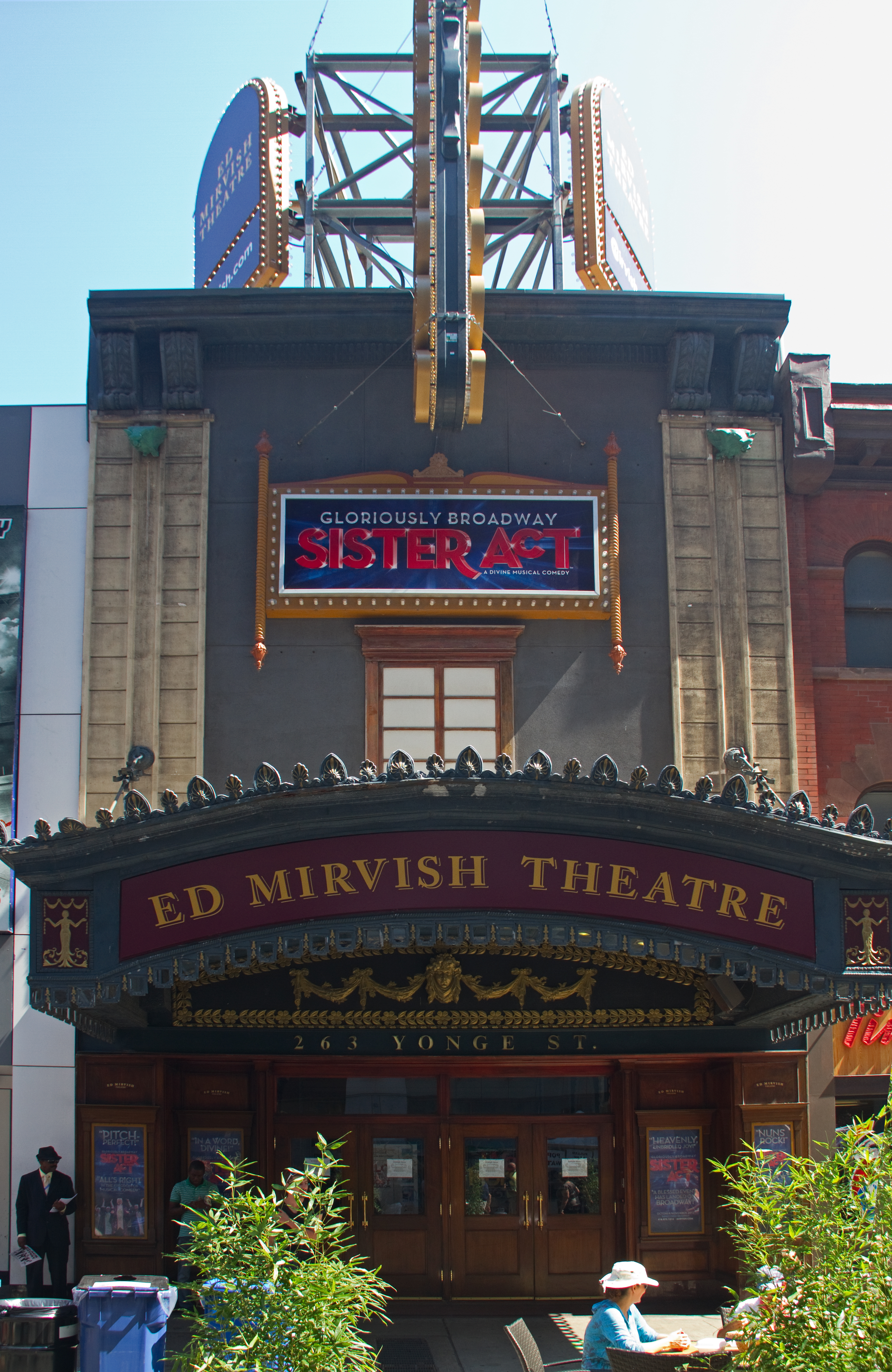
The Ed Mirvish Theatre.

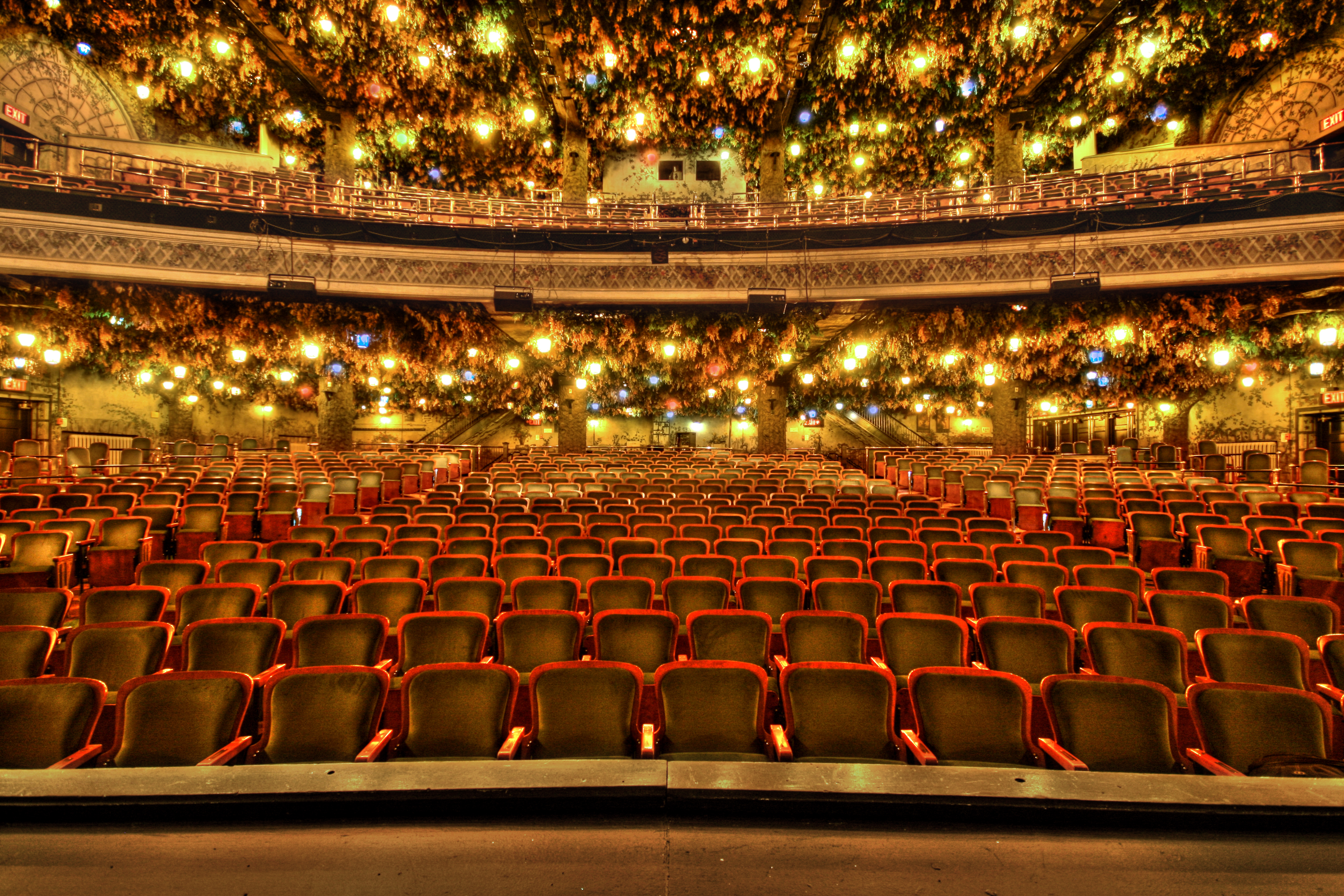
Interior of the Winter Garden Theatre.

Dozens of other theatres and performing arts organizations are active in the district. The city's main theatre district also includes the Theatre Museum Canada.

Several well-known theatres are located a few blocks east of the central theatre district, on Yonge Street. They include:

- Ed Mirvish Theatre
- Elgin and Winter Garden Theatres
- Massey Hall
- CAA Theatre

Also found just east of the central theatre district, on Toronto's harbour front, is the Sony Centre for the Performing Arts. The Four Seasons Centre for the Performing Arts home of the Canadian Opera Company and the National Ballet of Canada, and the St. Lawrence Centre is also located nearby. Farther east, in the historic Distillery District, are Soulpepper Theatre Company and Young Centre for the Performing Arts.

== Other attractions ==
Canada's Walk of Fame is located on several streets within the theatre district. Sports and entertainment venues in the area closely surrounding the district include the harbourfront to the south, the St. Lawrence Market, the Rogers Centre (Toronto Skydome) and the CN Tower. The city's nightclub district and bohemian Queen Street West neighbourhood are north of the theatre district.

A major new development project was announced by theatre and art patron David Mirvish in September 2012. Mirvish announced plans to demolish the Princess of Wales Theatre to construct a highrise mixed-use complex, designed by architect Frank Gehry. While the complex was slated to include an art gallery, a new campus for the Ontario College of Art and Design, and retail and condominium construction, the project has been scaled back after community backlash.

== Toronto theatre history ==
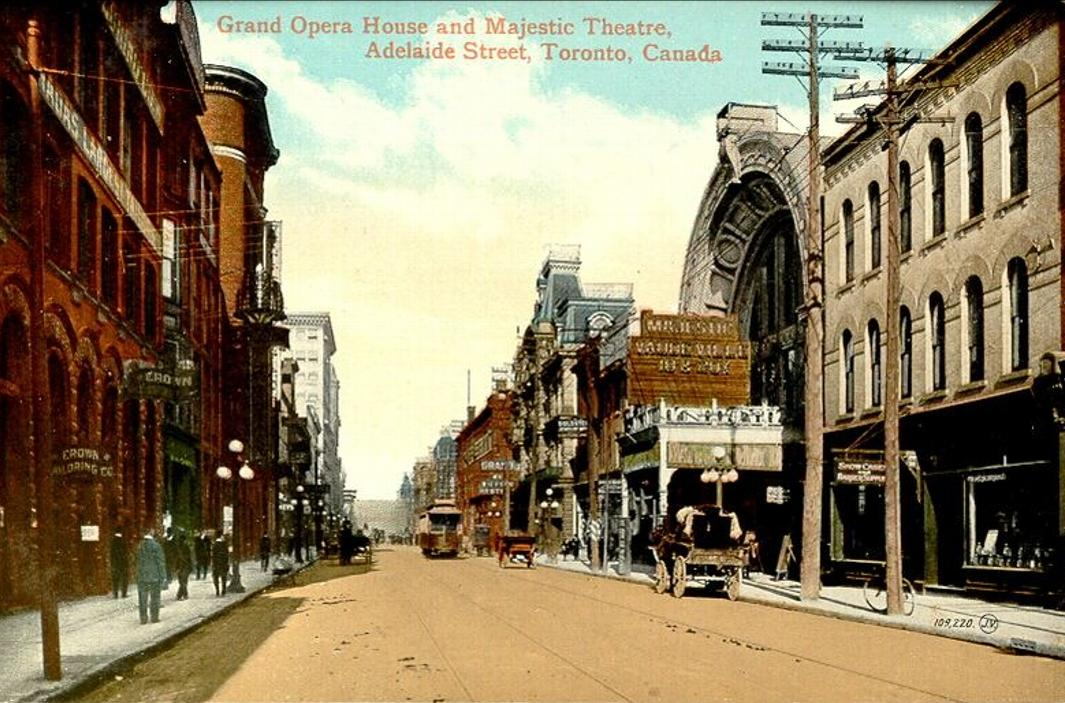
A 1904 postcard showing the Grand Opera House and Majestic Theatre, Adelaide Street, in the current Toronto theatre district.

Early English theatre in Toronto consisted of plays written abroad, mainly classic theatre works by British playwrights, as well as popular music hall entertainment. Some of Toronto's oldest landmark theatres were built at the turn of the 20th century, including the Royal Alexandra, Massey Hall, and the Elgin and Winter Garden Theatres.

Toronto's population grew rapidly during the boom years after World War II, and retained a bustling downtown core at the same time. This enabled these venerable old theatres to remain in business, although far from their original glory; they served a number of other purposes, and the Elgin and Winter Garden Theatres became movie houses, a martial arts dojo, and even a pornography cinema at their most neglected. The sorry state of affairs for the Elgin & Winter Garden Theatres would turn around in the 1980s, when the Ontario Heritage Trust purchased the theatres and refurbished them, staging major productions like Cats.

The late 1960s and early 1970s were especially fruitful years for theatre in Toronto. Riding a wave of nationalism that coincided with the Canadian centenary of Confederation in 1967, the public had a greater interest in productions of works by Canadian playwrights. Playwrights such as James Reaney, David French and Judith Thompson quickly gained a following in Toronto. Tarragon Theatre was founded in 1971 by Bill Glassco and his wife, Jane Gordon, with a focus on new Canadian works. In 1968, Theatre Passe Muraille, now Canada's oldest alternative theatre, was founded. Buddies in Bad Times Theatre was founded by York University students in the mid-1970s.

Prominent Toronto businessman Ed Mirvish bought and restored the Royal Alexandra Theatre in the 1960s, and began bringing major Broadway and West End shows to Toronto. Toronto's appetite for megamusicals grew, and in the 1990s Mirvish built the Princess of Wales Theatre and staged a lavish local production of Miss Saigon, marking another turning point in Toronto's theatre history. Toronto's local productions and small theatre companies continue to flourish. Touring shows from Broadway and the West End are also now a regular part of Toronto's nightlife.

== See also ==
- Theatre of Canada
