= Avard Hudgins =

Canadian prospector

Avard Dinsmore Hudgins (June 20, 1936 – June 8, 2016) was a Canadian prospector, exploration geologist, and educator. Based in The Maritimes, he is credited with having discovered and promoted regional mines, several of which ended up employing hundreds of people.

== Early life ==
Avard Hudgins was born in Middleton, Nova Scotia. He grew up in the nearby fishing village of Margaretsville, where his parents Russell and Fanne (Greene) operated the general store. Hudgins' father was an avid outdoorsman, while his mother had a hobby business crafting jewelry based on agates collected from the beach. His older sister Nancy studied fine art, while Avard found his calling as a geology student at Acadia University, graduating in 1957. He married Joan Neatby the following year, worked briefly in the Sudbury area, then returned to Acadia for a master's degree. Eventually the "hub" town of Truro, Nova Scotia became his base of operations.

== Legacy ==
By the end of a career spanning over five decades, Hudgins had gained renown as "the dean of Nova Scotia prospectors" and "a true giant of Nova Scotia’s mineral industry". After winning a special award at the 2001 Mining Matters conference, Hudgins was recognized by the Nova Scotia legislature, via a resolution stating "his dedication and perseverance in the prospecting field has attracted significant mineral exploration investment at the Loch Lomond celestite mine, the Gays River lead zinc mine, and the tin mine at East Kemptville". In 2003, after winning the Distinguished Service Award from the Prospectors and Developers Association of Canada, Hudgins was congratulated by the legislature "on his lifelong commitment to exploration and promotion of the province's mineral resources", also noting "Mr. Hudgins' efforts have resulted in millions of dollars of investment in Nova Scotia and in several hundred jobs at three mines that were placed into production as a direct result of his work".

Hudgins was very involved in mentoring young geologists over the years. He made many presentations to industry groups and students. Arnold McAllister, professor emeritus in the Department of Geology at the University of New Brunswick, stated: “I am confident that Mr. Hudgins is better acquainted with mineral occurrences in the Maritime Provinces than any other single individual, regardless of their mining or academic experience.”
