= Theatre Museum Canada =

Coordinates: 43.650°N 79.359°W

Canada's Theatre Museum
- Established: 1982
- Location: Toronto, Ontario Canada
- Type: Theatre Museum
- Website: Theatre Museum Canada

Canada's Theatre Museum (formerly Theatre Museum Canada) was founded by Herbert Whittaker in 1982, for the purpose of preserving and celebrating Canada's theatrical cultural heritage. The museum's honorary patron is Colm Feore.

One of its ongoing projects is the Legends Library, which consists of filmed interviews of Canadian theatre icons such as William Hutt and Robert LePage. In addition to their online exhibits, the museum tours exhibits to various venues in Toronto.

On March 23, 2023, Canada's Theatre Museum announced that it will have a new home located in the Elgin and Winter Garden Theatres. Planning and design work is underway with Toronto-based international multidisciplinary design firm Reich&Petch. The new museum will be an integral part of Canada’s theatre community, past, present and future with space for dynamic exhibits, presentations and educational programming.

== Affiliations ==
The Museum is affiliated with: CMA, CHIN, and Virtual Museum of Canada.
